= List of documents relating to the News International phone hacking scandal =

This is a list of key documents relating to the News International phone hacking scandal. Dates in parentheses indicate approximately when each document was created or obtained.

1. Documents at Scotland Yard relating to the investigations of Jonathan Rees; (1987-) "Scotland Yard is believed to have collected hundreds of thousands of documents during a series of investigations into Jonathan Rees over his links with corrupt officers, and over the 1987 murder of his former business partner, Daniel Morgan. Charges of murder against Rees were dismissed" in 2011. As of June 2011, Nick Davies, reporter for The Guardian, believed these "boxloads" of paperwork "could include explosive new evidence of illegal news-gathering by the News of the World and other papers."
2. Documents seized in 2003 by the Information Commissioner's Office from the home of private investigator Stephen Whittamore as part of Operation Motorman; (1990s-2003) Includes "more than 13,000 requests for confidential information from newspapers and magazines." "The Information Commissioner has resisted all requests to release the entire collection of paperwork seized from Whittamore, which covers a total of 13,343 requests for information from 305 journalists not only from News International but also from the Mirror Group, the Observer and Associated Newspapers." In February 2011, Mr Justice Geoffrey Vos, ordered the disclosure of this ICO material in response to"the phone hacking claim being brought by former MP George Galloway".
3. Information Commissioner's Office (ICO) publications, "What Price Privacy? and "What Price Privacy Now?"; (May & December 2006) Reports are based upon findings from Operation Motorman.
4. Documents seized by the Metropolitan Police from the home of private investigator Glenn Mulcaire; (August 2006) 11,000 pages of evidence. Includes a voicemail target list with over 4,000 names on it.
5. Archive of millions of emails dating back to 2005; (2005-) "revealing daily contact between News of the World editors, reporters and outsiders, including private investigators." The emails appear to have been deleted around January 2011. Police have attempted to retrieve the lost data. HCL Technologies, an Indian technology company, was requested by News International on thirteen different occasions to delete large numbers of emails. In September 2011 having been ordered to search its internal email system, News Group Newspapers "found 'many tens of thousands' of new documents and emails that could contain evidence about the scale of phone hacking at the paper...Two very large new caches of documents have been [discovered] which the current management were unaware of." NGN was ordered in the summer to search its internal email system for any evidence that mobile phones belonging to a list of public figures were targeted by the paper...very large new caches of documents have been [discovered] which the current management were unaware of."
6. Advisory (written?) from The Crown Prosecution Service (CPS) to The Metropolitan Police Service Regarding Voicemail. (2006) "Police investigation was hindered by the advice from the CPS that phone hacking was only an offence if messages had been intercepted before they were listened to by the intended recipient." The Director of Public Prosecutions (DPP) at the time was Ken Macdonald.
7. "Transcript For Neville"; (29 June 2005) This is one of the documents seized from Glenn Mulcair's home in 2006. It was sent by Ross Hall (a.k.a. Ross Hindley), then a journalist at News of the World, to Glen Mulcaire and titled "Transcript for Neville." The email included "a transcript of 15 messages from Gordon Taylor's mobile phone voicemail and a transcript of 17 messages left by [him] on Ms. Armstrong's (a business associate of Taylor) mobile phone voicemail." The email appeared to indicate that illegal interception of voice mail messages was not limited to single "rogue reporter" Clive Goodman as News of the World had been maintaining, but may also have included reporter Neville Thurlbeck who was also at News of the World. The email was received by the paper's legal adviser, Tom Crone about 12 May 2008, and he promptly discussed it with the paper's editor, Colin Myler. These two claim they then promptly met with James Murdoch and indicated the significance of the email to him, resulting in agreement to make a large settlement payment to Gordon Taylor. Murdoch has denied he was aware of the email when he agreed to the settlement or that he had reason to believe there was more than one reporter involved in phone hacking at News International's publications.
8. Letter from Les Hinton to Clive Goodman dismissing him and subsequent correspondence; (5 February 2007-14 March 2007) between Mr. Goodman and News International.
9. Letter from Clive Goodman to Daniel Cloke regarding Unfair dismissal (2 March 2007); key portions are redacted. Alleges that phone hacking was widely discussed at News of the World editorial meetings chaired by the editor, who at that time was Andy Coulson. Also alleges Goodman was promised he could return to News of the World if he did not implicate the paper or any of its staff in the issue.
10. "Lengthy list of documents" requested by Clive Goodman from News International; Documents reportedly included emails between Goodman and "various News of the World executives.
11. 2,500 emails reviewed by Colin Myer; (2007) then editor of News of the World and Daniel Cloke, Director of Human Resources of News International. As of July 2011, "William Lewis and his News International colleagues on a newly created management and standards committee have not found the full 2,500 e-mails mentioned by Mr Myler, just the sub-set of 300 that were passed to Harbottle & Lewis."
12. Emails reviewed by Jonathan Chapman and Daniel Cloke; (May 2007) Made available in electronic folders by News International' Information Technology department. No evidence of illegal activity observed. These emails may be the same ones subsequently made available to Harbottle & Lewis.
13. 300 emails reviewed by Harbottle & Lewis (May 2007) These were the basis for Lawrence Abramson's letter to Jon Chapman of News International. These emails reportedly "appear to show Andy Coulson, editor of the News of the World from 2003-2007, authorising payments to the police for help with stories. They also appear to show that phone hacking went wider than the activities of a single rogue reporter, which was the News of the World's claim at the time."
14. Letter from Solicitor Lawrence Abramson of Harbottle and Lewis to Jon Chapman of News International (29 May 2007) Regarding 300 emails that H&L reviewed from the accounts of Andy Coulson, Stuart Kuttner, Ian Edmondson, Clive Goodman, Neil Wallis, and Jules Stenson." In the letter, "Mr Abramson confirmed to Mr. Chapman that it 'did not find anything in those e-mails which appeared to us to be reasonable evidence that Clive Goodman's illegal actions were known about and supported by both or either of Andy Coulson, the editor, and Neil Wallis, the deputy editor, and/or that Ian Edmondson, the news editor, and others were carrying out similar illegal procedures'... [It] makes no mention of whether the e-mails contain evidence of wrongdoing by journalists other than Mr Goodman."
15. Forensic Report for FLOORgraphics, Inc.; (11 May 2007) Confirmed that someone at News Corporation's News America Marketing subsidiary repeatedly hacked into FLOORgraphics computer in 2003 and 2004.
16. Email to James Murdoch from Colin Myler (7 June 2008) Advised Murdoch that the situation with the Gordon Taylor was "as bad as we feared." Included at the end of Myler's comments was an email to Myler from Tom Crone that refers to a "nightmare scenario" and to the "Ross Hindley email," a.k.a. the "Transcript For Neville." Included at the end of this email was an email to Tom Crone from Julian Pike, legal adviser to News Corporation from the firm of Farrer & Co, that Taylor wants to demonstrate that "what happened to him is/was rife throughout the organization [and] to correct the paper telling Parliament inquiries that this was not happening when it was." Murdoch claimed he did not read the email in its entirety and therefore did not grasp the implications that more than one "rogue reporter" was involved in phone hacking at News of the World.
17. Trial transcript for FLOORgraphics suit against News America Marketing; (2009). Suit alleges that the company's "website, protected by password security, had been broken into [11 times] without authorisation. The computer breach... was traced back to an IP address registered to News America's offices in Connecticut." News America Marketing is subsidiary of News Corporation.
18. Seven boxes of material from the archive of News International; (6 to 9 July 2011) Allegedly removed by Rebekah Brooks with the help of other conspirators to conceal documents and computers from the Metropolitan Police Service.
19. Transcript of Testimony of Rupert and James Murdoch to the Culture, Media, and Sport Committee and the Home Affairs Committee; (July 2011) Includes James Murdoch's testimony that he was unaware of the "For Neville" email when he decided to settle with Gordon Taylor.
20. Response from Tom Crone to John Whittingdale OBE MP; (>29 July 2011) States that Crone and Colin Myler had disclosed to James Murdoch the general contents of the "For Neville" email around June 2008, prior to the settlement with Gordon Taylor.
21. Response from Harbottle & Lewis (>29 July 2011) to the Culture, Media, and Sport Committee and the Home Affairs Committee; Clarifies H&L mandate from News International.
22. J. Chapman Statement to the Culture Media and Sport Select Committee; (11 August 2011) Cites misleading information given to the Committee with respect to the 2007 review of emails.
23. Farrer & Co Letter to the Culture Media and Sport Select Committee; (2 September 2011) States that Farrer & Company, then representing News Group Newspapers in the civil suit filed by Gordon Taylor, received a copy of the "Transcript for Neville" email on 2 April 2008.
24. News International Executive Email, (date unknown) reportedly of "obvious significance" referring to the phone hacking of a "well-known individual victim" and containing "an instruction relating to an individual's phone." The message was discovered in March 2012 by News International's lawyers Linklaters, News International's lawyers, in response to a search request by the Metropolitan Police but did not disclose it to the Leveson inquiry or to lawyers acting for hacking victims until July 2012.
