= Cheryl Carter =

Cheryl Carter may refer to:

- Cheryl Carter, defendant in R v Coulson, Brooks and others
- Cheryl Carter (Miss New Jersey), American beauty pageant winner; Miss New Jersey 1969
