= News International phone hacking scandal =

UK media scandal

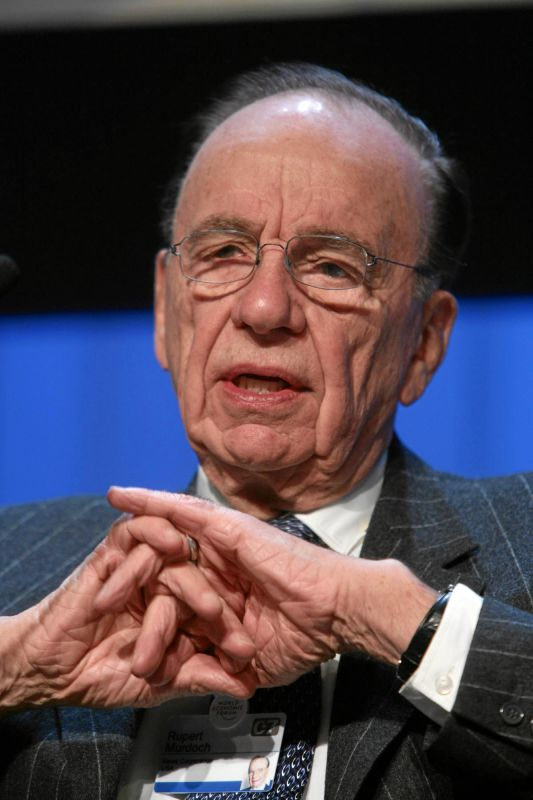
News Corporation owner Rupert Murdoch in 2007

Beginning in the 1990s, and going as far as its shutdown in 2011, employees of the now-defunct newspaper News of the World engaged in phone hacking, police bribery, and exercising improper influence in the pursuit of stories.

Investigations conducted from 2005 to 2007 showed that the paper's phone hacking activities were targeted at celebrities, politicians, and members of the British royal family. In July 2011 it was revealed that the phones of murdered schoolgirl Milly Dowler, relatives of deceased British soldiers, and victims of the 7 July 2005 London bombings had also been hacked. The resulting public outcry against News Corporation and its owner, Rupert Murdoch, led to several high-profile resignations, including that of Murdoch as News International director, Murdoch's son James as executive chairman, Dow Jones chief executive Les Hinton, News International legal manager Tom Crone, and chief executive Rebekah Brooks. The commissioner of London's Metropolitan Police, Sir Paul Stephenson, also resigned. Advertiser boycotts led to the closure of the News of the World on 10 July 2011, after 168 years of publication. Public pressure forced News Corporation to cancel its proposed takeover of the British satellite broadcaster BSkyB.

The United Kingdom's prime minister, David Cameron, announced on 6 July 2011 that a public inquiry, known as the Leveson Inquiry, would look into phone hacking and police bribery by the News of the World and consider the wider culture and ethics of the British newspaper industry, and that the Press Complaints Commission would be replaced "entirely". A number of arrests and convictions followed, most notably of the former News of the World managing editor Andy Coulson.

Murdoch and his son, James, were summoned to give evidence at the Leveson Inquiry. Over the course of his testimony, Rupert Murdoch admitted that a cover-up had taken place within the News of the World to hide the scope of the phone hacking. On 1 May 2012, a parliamentary select committee report concluded that the elder Murdoch "exhibited wilful blindness to what was going on in his companies and publications" and stated that he was "not a fit person to exercise the stewardship of a major international company". On 3 July 2013, Channel 4 News broadcast a secret tape from earlier that year, in which Murdoch dismissively claims that investigators were "totally incompetent" and acted over "next to nothing" and excuses his papers' actions as "part of the culture of Fleet Street".

== Early investigations, 1990s–2005 ==
By 2002, an organised trade in confidential personal information had developed in Britain and was widely used by the British newspaper industry. Illegal means of gaining information used included hacking the private voicemail accounts on mobile phones, hacking into computers, making false statements to officials, entrapment, blackmail, burglaries, theft of mobile phones and making payments to public officials.

=== Operation Nigeria ===
Private investigators who were illegally providing information to the News of the World were also engaged in a variety of other illegal activities. Between 1999 and 2003, several were convicted for crimes including drug distribution, the theft of drugs, child pornography, planting evidence, corruption, and perverting the course of justice. Jonathan Rees and his partner Sid Fillery, a former police officer, were also under suspicion for the murder of private investigator Daniel Morgan. The Metropolitan Police Service undertook an investigation of Rees, entitled Operation Nigeria, and tapped his telephone. Substantial evidence was accumulated that Rees was purchasing information from improper sources and that, amongst others, Alex Marunchak of the News of the World was paying him up to £150,000 a year for doing so. Jonathan Rees reportedly bought information from former and serving police officers, Customs officers, a VAT inspector, bank employees, burglars, and from blaggers who would telephone the Inland Revenue, the Driver and Vehicle Licensing Agency (DVLA), banks and phone companies, and deceive them into releasing confidential information. Rees then sold the information to the News of the World, the Daily Mirror, the Sunday Mirror and The Sunday Times.

The Operation Nigeria bugging ended in September 1999 and Rees was arrested when he was heard planning to plant drugs on a woman so that her husband could win custody of their child. Rees was convicted in 2000 and served a five-year prison sentence. Other individuals associated with Rees who were taped during Operation Nigeria, including Detective Constable Austin Warnes, former detective Duncan Hanrahan, former Detective Constable Martin King and former Detective Constable Tom Kingston, were prosecuted and jailed for various offences unrelated to phone hacking.

In June 2002, Fillery had reportedly used his relationship with Alex Marunchak to arrange for private investigator Glenn Mulcaire, then doing work for News of the World, to obtain confidential information about Detective Chief Superintendent David Cook, one of the police officers investigating the murder of Daniel Morgan. Mulcaire obtained Cook's home address, his internal Metropolitan police payroll number, his date of birth and figures for his mortgage payments as well as physically following him and his family. Attempts to access Cook's voicemail and that of his wife, and possibly hack his computer and intercept his post were also suspected. Documents reportedly held by Scotland Yard show that "Mulcaire did this on the instructions of Greg Miskiw, assistant editor at News of the World and a close friend of Marunchak." The Metropolitan Police Service handled this apparent attempt by agents of the News of the World to interfere with a murder inquiry by having informal discussions with Rebekah Brooks, then editor for the newspaper. "Scotland Yard took no further action, apparently reflecting the desire of Dick Fedorcio, Director of Public Affairs and Internal Communication for the Met who had a close working relationship with Brooks, to avoid unnecessary friction with the newspaper."

No one was charged with illegal acquisition of confidential information as a result of Operation Nigeria, even though the Met reportedly collected hundreds of thousands of incriminating documents during the investigation into Jonathan Rees and his links with corrupt officers. Fillery was convicted for child pornography offences in 2003. Upon Rees' release from prison in 2005, he immediately resumed his investigative work for the News of the World, where Andy Coulson had succeeded Rebekah Brooks as editor.

=== Operation Motorman ===
In 2002, under the title Operation Motorman, the Information Commissioner's Office raided the offices of various newspapers and private investigators, looking for details of personal information kept on unregistered computer databases. The operation uncovered numerous invoices addressed to newspapers and magazines, which detailed prices for the provision of personal information. A total of 305 journalists, working for at least 30 publications, were identified as purchasing confidential information from private investigators. The ICO raided a private investigator named John Boyall, whose specialty was acquiring information from confidential databases. Glenn Mulcaire had been Boyall's assistant, until the autumn of 2001 when the News of the World's assistant editor, Greg Miskiw gave him a full-time contract to do work for the newspaper. When the ICO raided Boyall's premises in November 2002 they seized documents that led them to the premises of another private investigator, Steve Whittamore. There they found "more than 13,000 requests for confidential information from newspapers and magazines". This established that confidential information was illegally acquired from telephone companies, the DVLA and the Police National Computer. "Media, especially newspapers, insurance companies and local authorities chasing council tax arrears all appear in the sales ledger" of the agency. Whittamore's network gave him access to confidential records at telephone companies, banks, post offices, hotels, theatres, and prisons, including BT Group, Crédit Lyonnais, Goldman Sachs, Hang Seng Bank, Glen Parva prison, and Stocken prison.

Although the ICO issued two reports, "What price privacy?" in May 2006 and "What price privacy now?" in December 2006, much of the information obtained through Operation Motorman was not made public. Although there was evidence of many people being engaged in illegal activity, relatively few were questioned. Operation Motorman's lead investigator said in 2006 that "his team were told not to interview journalists involved. The investigator ... accused authorities of being too 'frightened' to tackle journalists." The newspaper with the highest number of requests was the Daily Mail with 952 transactions by 58 journalists; the News of the World came fifth in the table, with 182 transactions from 19 journalists. The Daily Mail rejected the accusations within the report insisting it only used private investigators to confirm public information, such as dates of birth.

=== Operation Glade ===
Learning that Steve Whittamore was obtaining information from the police national computer, the Information Commissioner contacted the Metropolitan Police and the Met's anti-corruption unit initiated Operation Glade. Whittamore's detailed records identified 27 different journalists as having commissioned him to acquire confidential information for which they paid him tens of thousands of pounds. Invoices submitted to News International "sometimes made explicit reference to obtaining a target's details from their phone number or their vehicle registration". Between February 2004 and April 2005, the Crown Prosecution Service charged ten men working for private detective agencies with crimes relating to the illegal acquisition of confidential information. No journalists were charged. Whittamore, Boyall, and two others pleaded guilty in April 2005. According to ICO head Richard Thomas, "each pleaded guilty yet, despite the extent and the frequency of their admitted criminality, each was conditionally discharged [for two years], raising important questions for public policy."

== 2005–2006: Royal phone hacking scandal ==
On 14 November 2005, the News of the World published an article written by royal editor Clive Goodman that claimed Prince William was in the process of borrowing a portable editing suite from ITV correspondent Tom Bradby. Following the publication, the Prince and Bradby met to try to figure out how the details of their arrangement had been leaked, as only two other people were aware of it. Prince William noted that another equally improbable leak had recently taken place regarding an appointment he had made with a knee surgeon. The Prince and Bradby concluded it was likely that their voicemails were being accessed.

The Metropolitan Police set up an investigation under Deputy Assistant Commissioner Peter Clarke reporting to Assistant Commissioner Andy Hayman, commander of the Specialist Operations directorate, which included royal protection. By January 2006, Clarke's team had concluded that the compromised voice mail accounts belonged to Prince William's aides, not the Prince himself, and that there was an "unambiguous trail" to Clive Goodman, the News of the World royal reporter, and to Glenn Mulcaire, a private investigator. The detectives put Goodman and Mulcaire under surveillance and, on 8 August 2006, searched Goodman's desk at the News of the World and raided Mulcaire's home. There they seized "11,000 pages of handwritten notes listing nearly 4,000 celebrities, politicians, sports stars, police officials and crime victims whose phones may have been hacked." The names included eight members of the royal family and their staff. There were dozens of notebooks, two computers containing 2,978 complete or partial mobile phone numbers and 91 PIN codes, plus 30 tape recordings made by Mulcaire. Significantly, there were at least three names of News of the World journalists other than Goodman and a recording of Mulcaire instructing a journalist how to hack into private voice mail. All of this material was taken to Scotland Yard.

In August 2006, Goodman and Mulcaire were arrested by the Metropolitan Police, and later charged with hacking the telephones of members of the royal family by accessing voicemail messages, an offence under section 79 of the Regulation of Investigatory Powers Act 2000. The News of the World had paid Mulcaire £104,988 for his services. In addition, Goodman had paid Mulcaire £12,300 in cash between 9 November 2005 and 7 August 2006, using the code name Alexander on his expenses sheet for him. The court heard that Mulcaire had also hacked into the messages of supermodel Elle Macpherson, former publicist Max Clifford, MP Simon Hughes, football agent Sky Andrew, and Gordon Taylor. On 26 January 2007, both Goodman and Mulcaire pleaded guilty to the charges and were sentenced to four and six months imprisonment respectively. On the same day, Andy Coulson resigned as editor of the News of the World, while insisting that he had no knowledge of any illegal activities. In March 2007, a senior aide to Rupert Murdoch told a parliamentary committee that a "rigorous internal investigation" found no evidence of widespread hacking at the News of the World.

After Goodman and Mulcaire pleaded guilty, a breach of privacy claim was started by Gordon Taylor, chief executive of the Professional Footballers' Association who was represented by his solicitor Mark Lewis. That claim settled for a payment of £700,000 including legal costs. James Murdoch agreed to the settlement.

== PCC investigations ==
The Press Complaints Commission, PCC, was the organisation charged with self-regulation of the newspaper and magazine industry in Britain. The PCC's inquiry into phone hacking in 2007 concluded that the practice should stop but that "there is a legitimate place for the use of subterfuge when there are grounds in the public interest to use it and it is not possible to obtain information through other means". News of the World editor Colin Myler told the PCC that Goodman's hacking was "aberrational", "a rogue exception" of a single journalist. The PCC opted not to question Andy Coulson on the grounds that he had left the industry, and not to question any other journalist or executive on the paper, apart from Myler, who had no knowledge of what had been going on there before his appointment. The PCC's subsequent report failed to uncover any evidence of any phone hacking by any newspaper beyond that revealed at Goodman's trial.

In 2009 the PCC held another inquiry, to see whether they were misled by the News of the World in 2007, and if there was any evidence that phone hacking had taken place since then. It concluded it had not been misled and that there was no evidence of ongoing phone hacking. This report and its conclusions were withdrawn on 6 July 2011, two days after it was revealed that Milly Dowler's phone had been hacked.

== 2009–2011: Renewed investigations ==
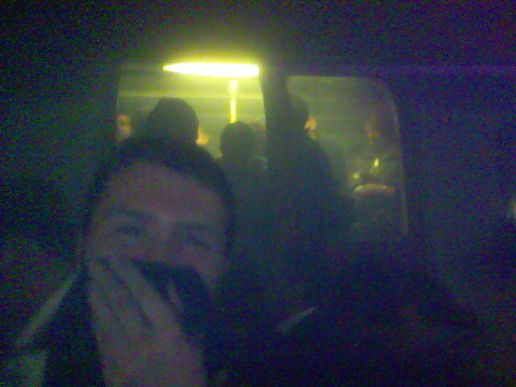
It was reported that the News of the World may have hacked the phones of relatives of 7/7 attack victims (survivors pictured aboard one of the bombed Underground trains).

Following the 2006 conviction of Clive Goodman and Glenn Mulcaire, and with assurances from News International, the Press Complaints Commission and the Metropolitan Police Service that no one else had been involved in phone hacking, the public perception was that the matter was closed. Nick Davies and other journalists from The Guardian, and eventually other newspapers, continued to examine evidence from court cases and use Freedom of Information Act 2000 requests to find evidence to the contrary.

=== The Guardian July 2009 reports ===
A small number of victims of phone hacking engaged solicitors and made civil claims for invasion of privacy. By March 2010, News International had spent over £2 million settling court cases with victims of phone hacking. As information about these claims leaked out, The Guardian continued to follow the story. On 8 & 9 July 2009, the newspaper published three articles alleging that:

- News Group Newspapers, NGN, a subsidiary of News International, agreed to large settlements with hacking victims, including Gordon Taylor. The settlements included gagging provisions to prevent release of evidence that NGN journalists had used criminal methods to get stories. "News Group then persuaded the court to seal the file on Taylor's case to prevent all public access, even though it contained prima facie evidence of criminal activity." That evidence included documents seized in raids by the Information Commissioner's Office as well as by the Met.
- If the suppressed evidence became public, hundreds more phone hacking victims might be able to take legal action against News International newspapers and might lead to police inquiries being re-opened.
- When Andy Coulson was editor of the News of the World, journalists there openly engaged private investigators for illegal phone hacking and raised invoices that itemised illegal acts.
- Everybody at the News of the World knew what was going on and knew that there was no public interest defence for phone hacking. The way investigations had been pursued raised serious questions about the Metropolitan Police, the Crown Prosecution Service, and the courts which, "faced with evidence of conspiracy and systemic illegal actions,... agreed to seal the evidence." rather than make it public.
- The Met held evidence that thousands of mobile phones had been hacked into by agents of the News of the World and that Members of Parliament, including cabinet ministers, were among the victims.
- "The Metropolitan Police took the decision not to inform all the individuals whose phones had been targeted and the Crown Prosecution Service decided not to take News Group executives to court."
- News International executives had misled a Parliamentary select committee, the Press Complaints Commission and the public about the extent of their newspaper's illegal activities.

=== Scotland Yard's response ===
When the Guardian articles were published, Metropolitan Police Service Commissioner Sir Paul Stephenson asked Assistant Commissioner John Yates to look at the phone hacking case to see if it should be reopened. Yates reportedly took just eight hours to consult with senior detectives and Crown Prosecution lawyers to conclude there was no fresh material that could lead to further convictions. His review did not include an examination of the thousands of pages of evidence seized in the 2006 Mulcaire raid. In September 2009, Yates maintained his position to the Commons Culture, Media and Sport Committee saying, "There remain now insufficient grounds or evidence to arrest or interview anyone else and... no additional evidence has come to light." Upon review of the first inquiry, he concluded that there were "hundreds, not thousands of potential victims". Yates told the committee, "It is very few, it is a handful" of persons that had been subject to hacking. Although Yates was aware of the "Transcript for Neville" email that indicated more than a single rogue reporter was involved, he did not interview Neville Thurlbeck nor any other journalist at the News of the World, nor look into the cases of victims beyond the eight named in court in 2006. The committee's findings, released in February 2010, were critical of the police for not pursuing "evidence that merited a wider investigation".

The Committee Chairman John Whittingdale also questioned whether the committee had been misled by several of the News International executives who had testified before it in 2007 that Goodman alone was involved in phone hacking. The Committee again heard evidence from Les Hinton, by then chief executive officer of Dow Jones & Company, and Andy Coulson, by then director of communications for the Conservative Party. Their report concluded that it was "inconceivable" that no one, other than Goodman, knew about the extent of phone hacking at the paper, and that the committee had "repeatedly encountered an unwillingness to provide the detailed information that we sought, claims of ignorance or lack of recall and deliberate obfuscation".

Assistant Commissioner Yates returned to the committee on 24 March 2011 and defended his position that only ten to twelve victims met the criteria given to the police by the Crown Prosecution Service. The CPS denied that what they had told the Met could be reasonably used to limit the scope of the investigation. Further, they claimed to have been misled by the Met during consultations on the Royal Household inquiry. Met officials reportedly "didn't discuss certain evidence with senior prosecutors, including the notes suggesting the involvement of other reporters."

The Home Affairs Select Committee also questioned Yates in 2009 about the Met's continuing refusal to reopen the investigation "following allegations that 27 other News International reporters had commissioned private investigators to carry out tasks, some of which might have been illegal." Yates responded that he had only looked into the facts of the original 2006 inquiry into Goodmans activities. The Home Affairs Committee began another inquiry on 1 September 2010 and later published a report highly critical of the Met, stating, "The difficulties were offered to us as justifying a failure to investigate further, and we saw nothing that suggested there was a real will to tackle and overcome those obstacles."

The Guardian continued to be critical of Yates, who responded by hiring a firm of libel lawyers, paid for by the Met, to threaten legal action against anyone that claimed he had misled Parliament. Eventually, as celebrities and politicians continued asking if they had been victims of hacking, Yates directed that the evidence from the Mulcaire raid, that had been stored in bin bags for three years, finally be entered into a computer database. Ten people were assigned the task. Yates himself did not look at the evidence saying later, "I'm not going to go down and look at bin bags. I am supposed to be an Assistant Commissioner." He did not re-open the investigation.

Days after the settlement with Gordon Taylor was revealed by The Guardian in July 2009, Max Clifford, another of the eight victims named in 2006, announced his intentions to sue. In March 2010, News International agreed to settle his suit for £1,000,000, a much greater than expected settlement if hacking Clifford's phone was the only issue. These two awards encouraged other victims to explore legal redress, resulting in more and more phone hacking queries to the Metropolitan Police, which they were often slow to respond to. One commentator observed that "the Goodman-Mulcaire revelations and subsequent prosecution were supposed to have settled the hacking matter forever and might have done just that, except that successful law suits... kept popping up against News of the World after the convictions."

=== The Guardian December 2010 report ===
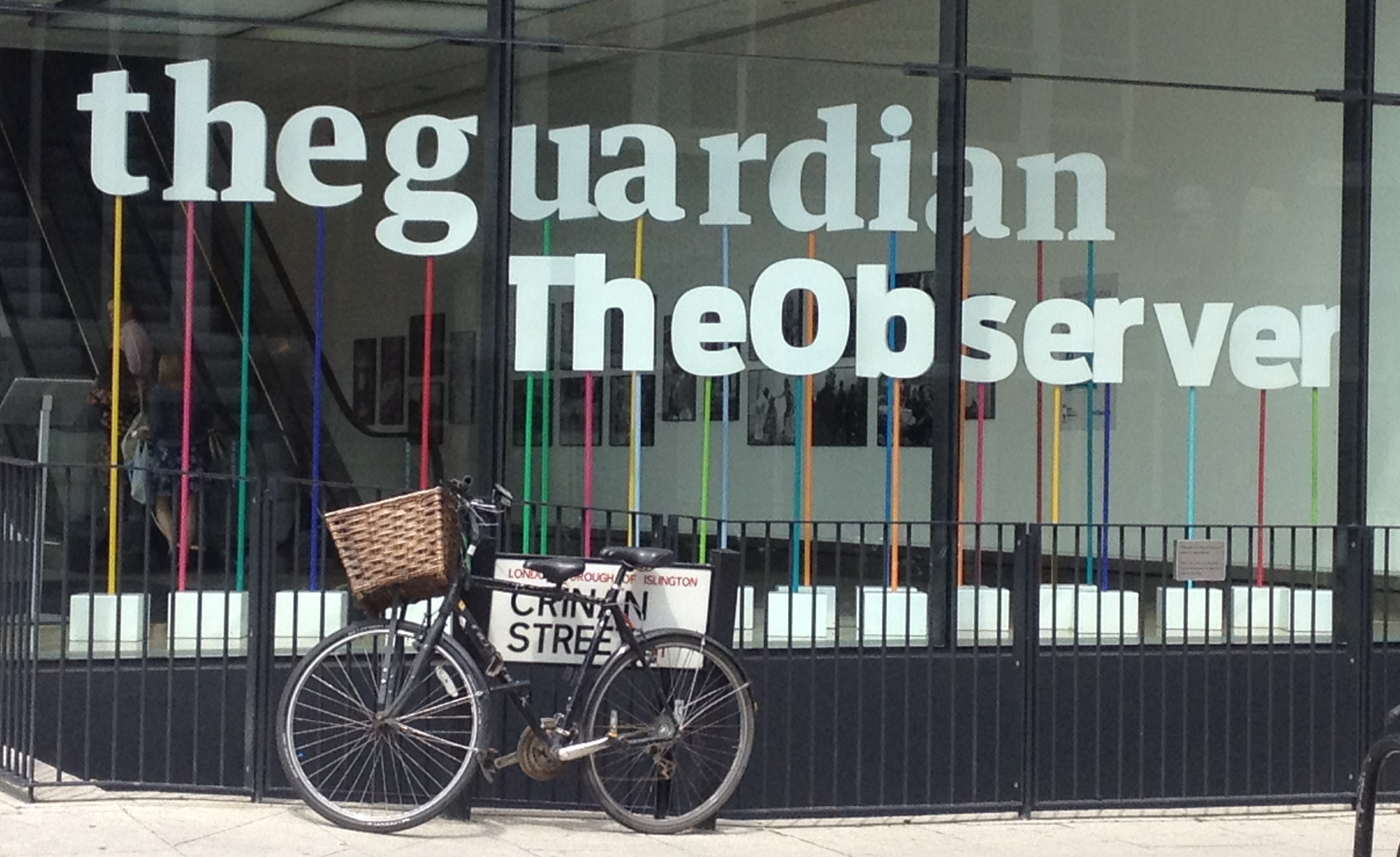
The Guardian newspaper was at the forefront of reporting on the phone hacking scandal.

On 15 December 2010, The Guardian reported that some of the documents seized from Glenn Mulcaire in 2006 by the Metropolitan Police Service and only recently disclosed in open court, implied that News of the World editor Ian Edmondson specifically instructed Mulcaire to hack voice messages of Sienna Miller, Jude Law, and several others. The documents also implied that Mulcaire was engaged by News of the World chief reporter Neville Thurlbeck and assistant editor Greg Miskiw, who had then worked directly for editor Andy Coulson. This contradicted testimony to the Culture, Media and Sport Committee by News International executives and senior Met officials that there was no evidence of hacking by anyone other than Mulcaire and Goodman. Within five weeks of the article appearing,

- Ian Edmondson was suspended from the News of the World,
- Andy Coulson resigned as Chief Press Secretary to David Cameron,
- the Crown Prosecution Service began a review of evidence it had,
- the Met renewed its investigation into phone hacking, something it had previously declined to do.

On 6 September 2010, Sienna Miller's lawyer, Mark Thomson, told News Group she planned to sue the News of the World.

== January–June 2011: Admission of liability ==
=== Operation Weeting begins ===
The Metropolitan Police announced on 26 January 2011 that it would begin a new investigation into phone hacking, following the receipt of "significant new information" regarding the conduct of News of the World employees. Operation Weeting would take place alongside the previously announced review of phone hacking evidence by the Crown Prosecution Service. Between 45 and 60 officers began looking over the 11,000 pages of evidence seized from Mulcaire in August 2006.

In June 2011, the issue of computer hacking was addressed with the launch of Operation Tuleta.

Having failed thus far to put the phone hacking issue to rest, News International's law firm, Hickman & Rose, hired former Director of Public Prosecutions Ken Macdonald to review the emails that News International executives had used as the basis of their claim that no one at the News of the World but Clive Goodman had been involved in phone hacking. Macdonald immediately concluded, regardless of whether others had been involved, that there was clear evidence of criminal activity, including payments to serving police officers. Macdonald arranged for this evidence to be turned over to the Met, which led to their opening in July 2011 of Operation Elveden, an investigation focused on bribery and corruption within the Met's ranks.

The first arrests as part of Operation Weeting were made on 5 April 2011. Ian Edmondson and the News of the World's chief reporter Neville Thurlbeck were arrested on suspicion of unlawfully intercepting voicemail messages. Both men had denied participating in illegal activities. The paper's assistant news editor, James Weatherup, was taken into custody for questioning by the Metropolitan Police on 14 April 2011. He had also dealt with some major fiscal issues, "managing huge budgets" and "crisis management" at the newspaper.

The Guardian, referring to the Information Commissioner's report of 2006, queried why the Metropolitan Police chose to exclude a large quantity of material relating to Jonathan Rees from the scope of its Operation Weeting inquiry. The News of the World was said to have made extensive use of Rees' investigative services, including phone hacking, paying him up to £150,000 a year. On the basis of evidence obtained during Operation Nigeria, Rees was found guilty in December 2000 of attempting to pervert the course of justice and received a seven-year prison sentence. After he was released from prison the News of the World, under the editorship of Andy Coulson, began commissioning Rees' services again.

The Guardian journalist Nick Davies described commissions from the News of the World as the "golden source" of income for Rees' "empire of corruption", which involved a network of contacts with corrupt police officers and a pattern of illegal behaviour extending far beyond phone hacking. Despite detailed evidence, the Metropolitan Police failed to pursue effective in-depth investigations into Rees' corrupt relationship with the News of the World over more than a decade.

On 12 July 2011, Metropolitan Police deputy assistant commissioner Sue Akers told MPs and the Home Affairs committee chairman Keith Vaz that police had contacted 170 of the 3,870 people named in Glenn Mulcaire's files to date.

=== Apology and compensation ===
News International announced on 8 April 2011 that it would admit liability in some of the breach of privacy cases being brought in relation to phone hacking by the News of the World. The company offered an unreserved apology and compensation to eight claimants, but would continue to contest allegations made by other litigants.

The eight claimants were identified in media reports as:

- Sienna Miller, actress
- Kelly Hoppen, interior designer and Miller's stepmother
- Tessa Jowell, Member of Parliament and former cabinet minister
- David Mills, lawyer and Jowell's former husband
- Andy Gray, sports pundit and former footballer
- Joan Hammell, aide to the former Deputy Prime Minister John Prescott
- Sky Andrew, sports talent agent
- Nicola Phillips, assistant to the publicist Max Clifford

At the time of News International's announcement, 24 individuals were in the process of taking legal action against the News of the World on breach of privacy grounds. Comic actor Steve Coogan was reported to be one of the suspected victims of phone hacking.

Hoppen lodged a further claim against the News of the World and one of its reporters, Dan Evans, for "accessing or attempting to access her voicemail messages between June 2009, and March 2010". News International has not admitted liability in relation to the claim.

On 10 April, Tessa Jowell and her former husband David Mills, Andy Gray, Sky Andrew, Nicola Phillips, Joan Hammell, and Kelly Hoppen all received the official apology and compensation, but actor Leslie Ash and John Prescott, who both had also claimed breach of privacy, did not.

Scottish politician Danny Alexander predicted further arrests would be made. The Shadow Secretary of State for Wales Peter Hain called on the legal authorities to conduct a "full and proper public investigation" and then claimed the police investigation had been "tardy".

The first individual to accept the News of the World's apology and compensation was actress Sienna Miller, who received £100,000 plus legal costs. Sports pundit Andy Gray followed in June, accepting a payout of £20,000 plus legal costs. Prior to the settlements, both individuals' litigation claims had been identified as phone hacking "test cases" to be heard in January 2012.

The BBC reported on 20 May 2011 that a senior News of the World executive was implicated, according to actor Jude Law's barrister in the High Court. This report also said that the number of people whose phones may have been hacked may be much larger than previously thought. The High Court was said to have been told that "notebooks belonging to a private investigator hired by News Group Newspapers contained thousands of mobile phone numbers" and "police also found 149 individual personal identification numbers and almost 400 unique voicemail numbers which can be used to access voice mail".

In January 2012, it was reported that Respect politician George Galloway, who was not an MP at the time, had settled out of court. Galloway had begun legal proceedings for breach of privacy in 2010 after being told by the Met that he had probably been targeted by Mulcaire. The terms of the settlement were not disclosed. Galloway said the apology was a cynical attempt to protect Rebekah Brooks.

In April, The Observer reported claims from a former minister that Rupert Murdoch tried to persuade Prime Minister Gordon Brown early in 2010 to help in resisting attempts by Labour MPs and peers to investigate the affair, and to go easy on News of the World in the run-up to the UK's general election of May 2010. News International described the report as "total rubbish"; a spokesperson for Brown declined to comment.

== July 2011: new allegations ==
=== Milly Dowler's voicemail ===
It was first reported by The Guardian on 4 July 2011 that police had found evidence suggesting that the private investigator Glenn Mulcaire collected personal information about the family of the missing Surrey teenager Milly Dowler, following her disappearance in March 2002 and the discovery of her body six months later. According to the paper, journalists working for the News of the World had hired private investigators to hack into Dowler's voicemail inbox shortly after her disappearance. It was alleged that they had deleted some messages, giving false hope to police and to Dowler's family, who thought that she might have deleted the messages and therefore might still be alive and potentially destroying valuable evidence about her abduction and any evidence against a potential abductor and murderer.

Levi Bellfield had been convicted of the murder just two weeks before these revelations – he had already been convicted of two murders and an attempted murder which took place after Milly's disappearance and the discovery of her body. It was later established that Dowler's phone had deleted the messages automatically, 72 hours after being listened to. The Guardian commented that the News of the World did not conceal from its readers in an article on 14 April 2002 that it had intercepted telephone messages and also informed Surrey police of this fact on 27 March 2002, six days after Milly went missing.

In July 2011, it was announced that the Dowler family was preparing a claim for damages against the News of the World. News Group Newspapers described the allegation as "a development of great concern". Reacting to the revelation, Prime Minister David Cameron said that the alleged hacking, if true, was "truly dreadful". He added that police ought to pursue a "vigorous" investigation to ascertain what had taken place. Leader of the opposition Ed Miliband called on Rebekah Brooks, the News of the World's editor in 2002, and then the chief executive of News International, to "consider her conscience and consider her position". Brooks denied knowledge of phone hacking during her editorship.

It was in the wake of the Dowler allegations that a significant number of people, including former deputy prime minister John Prescott and other politicians, began seriously to question whether the takeover of BSkyB by News Corporation should be vetoed by the appropriate government authorities. The Media Standards Trust formed the pressure group Hacked Off, to campaign for a public inquiry. Soon after launch, the campaign gained the support of suspected hacking victim, the actor Hugh Grant, who became a public spokesperson, appearing on Question Time and Newsnight.

In January 2012, it was revealed that Surrey Police had discovered during the early stages of their inquiries that News of the World staff had accessed Milly Dowler's mobile phone messages but did not take issue with this. Instead, a senior Surrey officer invited News of the World staff to a meeting to discuss the case.

=== British soldiers' relatives ===
On 6 July 2011, The Daily Telegraph reported that the voicemail accounts of some relatives of British soldiers killed in action in Iraq since 2003 and Afghanistan since 2001 may have been eavesdropped by the News of the World. The personal details and phone numbers belonging to relatives of dead service personnel were found in the Glen Mulcaire's files. In response to the allegations, The Royal British Legion announced that it would suspend all ties with the News of the World, dropping the newspaper as its campaigning partner.

=== 7/7 London attack victims ===
On the day before the sixth anniversary of the 7 July 2005 London bombings, it was reported that relatives of some victims may have had their telephones snooped on by the News of the World in the aftermath of the attacks. A man who lost two children in the bombings told the BBC that police officers investigating phone hacking had warned him that their contact details were found on a target list, while a former firefighter who helped rescue injured passengers also said he had been contacted by police who were looking into the hacking allegations. A number of survivors from the bombings revealed that police had warned them their phones may have been hacked and their messages intercepted; in some cases they were advised to change security codes and PINs.

=== Sara Payne ===
On 28 July, The Guardian reported that the News of the World hacked into the voicemail of media campaigner Sara Payne, whose eight-year-old daughter, Sarah Payne, was murdered in West Sussex by convicted paedophile Roy Whiting, in July 2000. This news was arguably met with even more public outrage than the Dowler revelations, given the prominent role that Rebekah Brooks and the News of the World played in the passage of Sarah's Law, which changed sex offender laws in the UK. Payne has been an active campaigner in favour of such laws with News International and other media and charity organisations since her daughter's death.

Brooks developed a long-standing friendship with Payne in the years after her daughter's death; Payne wrote a column praising the News of the World's support for Sarah's Law in its final issue, writing that the paper's staff "supported me through some of the darkest, most difficult times of my life and became my trusted friends". Brooks used the Sarah's Law campaign to defend the News of the World when she was questioned by the Culture, Media and Sport Committee.

Scotland Yard had reportedly found materials pertaining to Payne in Glenn Mulcaire's notes. They also discovered that Payne's voicemail was on a mobile phone given to her by Brooks, ostensibly to help her keep in touch with supporters. Brooks issued a statement denying that the News of the World was aware of Mulcaire's targeting of Payne, saying that such an idea was "unthinkable". Payne was said to be "absolutely devastated and deeply disappointed" at the disclosure.

=== Other victims ===
Some email messages were discovered suggesting Jonathan Rees made requests for sums of around £1,000 for contact details of senior members of the Royal Family and friends.

Former deputy prime minister John Prescott claimed he knew of "direct evidence" indicating The Sunday Times was involved in illegal news gathering activities. Former prime minister Gordon Brown alleged his bank account was accessed by The Sunday Times in 2000, and that The Sun gained private medical records about his son, Fraser, who has cystic fibrosis. Rebekah Brooks telephoned Brown to tell him that The Sun was going to reveal that his son had been diagnosed with cystic fibrosis and tried to persuade him not to spoil the newspaper's exclusive by announcing it himself first. The Guardian later ran a front-page story accusing The Sun of improperly obtaining the medical records of Brown's son, but was later forced to issue an apology upon discovering that the information came from a member of the public. Other victims of hacking included former Metropolitan Police assistant commissioner John Yates, who revealed on 12 January 2011 that his phone was hacked between 2004 and 2005. The phone of chat show host Paul O'Grady was also hacked by the News of the World after he suffered a heart attack in 2006.

In May 2012 it was reported that billionaire Robert Agostinelli had been targeted by a private detective named Steve Whitamore working for Rupert Murdoch's newspaper to gain confidential information pertaining to Agostinelli's business affairs – this evidence brought to light the fact that high-profile U.S. citizens were targeted by private investigators in the UK within Rupert Murdoch's empire. This was revealed once the Information Commissioner's Office raided Steve Whittamore's offices and was subsequently convicted of illegally trading personal information.

In July 2011 it was reported that Mark Stephens had been one of a group of high-profile lawyers who may have been the victim of "News International phone hacking scandal".

Mary Ellen Field, the former business manager of model Elle Macpherson, lost her job after Field was accused of leaking confidential information to the News of the World, which had published a story about Macpherson's split with Arpad Busson. Field realised their voicemails could have been intercepted after Glenn Mulcaire admitted in court to accessing Macpherson's phones.

A cousin of Jean Charles de Menezes, the Brazilian man shot dead by police who mistook him for a fugitive suspected of involvement in the 21 July 2005 attempted bombings in London, may also have had his phone hacked by the News of the World after Menezes's death. A spokesperson from the Justice4Jean campaign group said: "The Menezes family are deeply pained to find their phones may have been hacked at a time at which they were at their most vulnerable and bereaved."

Carole Caplin, the former fitness adviser to Prime Minister Tony Blair, announced that the Metropolitan police had told her that her mobile phone was probably hacked, dating back to 2002 – along with the Milly Dowler case in the same year, this is one of the earliest cases so far discovered.

== Aftermath ==
=== Closure of the News of the World ===
The final edition of News of the World, published on 10 July 2011

The closure of the News of the World after 168 years in print, was the first significant effect of the scandal. In the days leading up to 7 July 2011, Virgin Holidays, The Co-operative Group, Ford Motor Company and General Motors (owner of Vauxhall Motors) had all pulled their advertisements from the News of the World in response to the unfolding controversy. Several other major advertisers also considered doing the same.

James Murdoch announced on 7 July 2011 that after 168 years in print the News of the World would publish its last-ever edition on 10 July, with the loss of 200 jobs. Downing Street said it had no role in the decision. James Murdoch conceded the paper was "sullied by behaviour that was wrong", saying "if recent allegations are true, it was inhuman and has no place in our company".

Other executives of the company said the phone hacking was more widespread than previously believed and that they were co-operating with investigations into the allegations. Editor Rebekah Brooks told staff at a meeting, that she recognised following an internal investigation that "other shoes would drop", a phrase indicating that further revelations of wrongdoing would follow.

There was immediate speculation that News International would launch a Sunday edition of The Sun to replace its sister paper News of the World. The Sun on Sunday was launched on 26 February 2012.

=== BSkyB takeover bid withdrawn ===
Rupert Murdoch announced on 13 July 2011 that News Corporation was withdrawing its proposal to take full control of the subscription television broadcaster BSkyB, due to concerns over the ongoing furore. The announcement was made a few hours before the House of Commons was due to debate a motion, supported by all major parties, calling on News Corporation to withdraw its proposal. In a symbolic gesture the House later passed the motion unanimously by acclamation.

=== New York State contract lost by subsidiary of News Corporation ===
In the week of 22 August 2011, Wireless Generation, a subsidiary of News Corporation, lost a no-bid contract with New York State to build an information system, for tracking student performance as a consequence of the News International phone hacking scandal. Citing "vendor responsibility issues with the parent company of Wireless Generation", state comptroller Thomas DiNapoli said that the revelations surrounding News Corporation had made the final approval of the contract "untenable".

=== Resignations ===
A number of senior employees and executives resigned from News International and its parent company, after the emergence of the new allegations, along with high-ranking officers of the Metropolitan Police Service. News International's legal manager Tom Crone left the company on 13 July. As part of his role at the publisher, Crone had been the News of the World's chief lawyer and gave evidence before parliamentary committees, that he had uncovered no evidence of phone hacking beyond the criminal offences committed by the royal editor Clive Goodman. He maintained that he did not see an internal report suggesting that phone hacking at the paper went beyond Goodman.

On 15 July, Rebekah Brooks, the chief executive of News International, quit following widespread criticism of her role in the controversy. In a statement, Brooks said that "my desire to remain on the bridge has made me a focal point of the debate" and stated that she would "concentrate on correcting the distortions and rebutting the allegations about my record". Her exit was welcomed by political leaders. Prime Minister David Cameron's office said that her departure was "the right decision", while Leader of the Opposition Ed Miliband agreed but suggested that she should have departed ten days earlier. Tom Mockridge, the long-time chief executive of the Italian satellite broadcaster Sky Italia, was announced as Brooks' replacement at the head of News International.

Later that day, Les Hinton resigned as the chief executive of the News Corporation subsidiary Dow Jones & Company. Hinton had been chief executive of News International from 1997 to 2005. He had told parliamentary committees that there was "never any evidence" of phone hacking beyond the case of Clive Goodman. In his resignation announcement, Hinton said that he was not told of "evidence that wrongdoing went further" but indicated that he nevertheless felt it "proper" to resign from his position.

On 17 July, the Commissioner of the Metropolitan Police and Britain's most senior police officer, Sir Paul Stephenson, announced his resignation with immediate effect. He had faced criticism for hiring former News of the World executive editor Neil Wallis as an advisor and for having received free hospitality at a luxury health spa owned by a company for which Wallis also worked. Stephenson's resignation was followed by that of assistant commissioner John Yates on 18 July. Yates had been criticised for failing to re-open the original 2006 investigation into phone hacking at News International, despite new evidence coming to light in 2009. In the wake of the later 2012 allegations against The Sun and arrests of executives, senior reporters and other personnel, James Murdoch resigned from his posts as News International executive chairman and BSkyB chairman on 1 March 2012. Later that July, Rupert Murdoch resigned from his directorships at Times Newspaper Holdings, NewsCorp Investments and News International Group Limited.

=== Dismissals ===
Matt Nixson was escorted by security from the Wapping headquarters of The Sun newspaper the evening of 20 July 2011. His computer was seized by News International officials and the police were said to have been informed. Nixson was a features editor at The Sun. It was reported that Nixson's dismissal was related to the time he spent at the News of the World from 2006, when it was edited by Coulson. At the News of the World he reported to assistant editor Ian Edmondson. On 20 September it was reported that the Metropolitan police had written to News International to inform them that they did not intend to question Nixson over phone hacking. Nixson was reported to be considering bringing a case for unfair dismissal against his former employers. Nixson won his case against his former employer in October 2012.

=== Leaves/suspensions ===
Pending the result of an Independent Police Complaints Commission (IPCC – see below) enquiry into his dealings with Neil Wallis (see below), a former assistant editor of the News of the World, Dick Fedorcio, director of public affairs and internal communication for the Metropolitan Police, was put on extended leave 10 August 2011.

=== Cautions ===
Details emerged 7 September 2011 that senior journalist Amelia Hill of The Guardian was questioned under caution but not arrest, for several hours by officers from Operation Weeting the previous week. Hill had reported the names of individuals linked to the phone hacking scandal minutes after their arrests and it is thought her questioning was linked to the earlier arrest of a 51-year-old detective suspected of leaking information to the newspaper.

=== Apologies ===
A full-page apology ad published in British newspapers by News International. The letter, signed by Rupert Murdoch, begins: "The News of the World was in the business of holding others to account. It failed when it came to itself."

From 15 July 2011, onwards, News Corp began to change its position through a series of public apologies. On 15 July, Rupert Murdoch in interview with the News Corp owned The Wall Street Journal apologised for the News of the World letting slip the group's standards of journalism. Murdoch also alleged that the group's legal advisers, Harbottle & Lewis, had made "a major mistake" in its part in the internal investigation into phone-hacking in 2007. On 18 July, Harbottle & Lewis issued an open letter outlining its position, and appointed Luther Pendragon to handle PR issues relating to the affair.

On 16 and 17 July, News International published two full-page apologies in many of Britain's national newspapers. The first apology took the form of a letter, signed by Rupert Murdoch, in which he said sorry for the "serious wrongdoing" that occurred. The second was titled "Putting right what's gone wrong", and gave more detail about the steps News International was taking to address the public's concerns.

On the afternoon before the ads were published, Rupert Murdoch also attended a private meeting in London with the family of Milly Dowler, where he apologised for the hacking of their murdered daughter's voicemail. The Dowler family's solicitor later said Murdoch appeared shaken and upset during the talks. He added that the Dowlers were surprised Murdoch's son James did not attend and called on the News International chairman to "take some responsibility" in the affair.

In February 2013 News International expressed "sincere" contrition and paid undisclosed "substantial" damages for a total of 144 cases. Among 17 phone-hacking victims given public apologies by News International in the High Court were Sarah, Duchess of York, actors Hugh Grant and Christopher Eccleston, the Catholic parish priest of singer Charlotte Church, singer James Blunt, Uri Geller, Geoffrey Robinson, the former Labour minister, and Colin Stagg, the man wrongly accused of the murder of Rachel Nickell. Mr Stagg, one of the few to have his damages disclosed, was awarded £15,500. Others who settled but opted to keep the terms of the arrangement private, included Cherie Blair, the wife of the former prime minister, UK Independence Party leader Nigel Farage, TV presenters Jamie Theakston and Chris Tarrant, Ted Beckham, the father of the former England football captain, former Tory minister David Maclean, Baron Blencathra, actor James Nesbitt, footballer Wayne Rooney and BBC reporter Tom Mangold.

In March 2013, audio emerged of Rupert Murdoch in a staff meeting at the Sun criticising the Police for continuing their investigation, and portraying the paper as the victim, not those they had paid damages to a month earlier.

=== Further arrests ===
Since 1999, over 100 people have been arrested in conjunction with illegal acquisition of confidential information. Over 90 of these have been arrested or rearrested since police investigations were renewed in 2011. Of these, 26 have been formally charged with crimes.

==== Andy Coulson ====
The Guardian reported on 7 July 2011, that former News of the World editor and David Cameron's former spokesman Andy Coulson was to be arrested the following day, along with a senior journalist the paper refused to name. Sky News reported on 8 July 2011, that Coulson had been formally arrested, although the Metropolitan Police would only confirm that a "43-year-old man" had been arrested for "conspiring to intercept communications", he was then released without charge.

On 30 May 2012, Coulson was charged with perjury, and later that year his and Rebekah Brooks' trial date was set for 9 September 2013.

In June 2014, Coulson was found guilty of one charge of conspiracy to intercept voicemails and he was sentenced to 18 months in prison on 4 July 2014. On 21 November 2014, Coulson was released from prison having served less than five months of his 18-month prison sentence.

Coulson was to face a retrial after the jury failed to agree a verdict on two other charges of conspiring to cause misconduct in public office in relation to the alleged purchase of confidential royal phone directories in 2005 from a palace police officer. On 17 April 2015, the Crown Prosecution Service announced that Coulson's prosecution was to be dropped.

==== Neil Wallis ====
Former News of the World executive editor Neil Wallis was arrested in west London on 14 July, on suspicion of conspiring to intercept communications. He joined the paper in 2003 as a deputy to Coulson and in 2007, became an executive editor before leaving in 2009. Later that year his media consultancy company began to advise Paul Stephenson and John Yates, two high-ranking Metropolitan Police officers, providing "strategic communications advice" until September 2010. During that time, Yates made the decision that the phone hacking needed no further investigation, despite The Guardian alleging that the previous investigation had been inadequate. He was also paid to advise commissioner Stephenson and Yates.

==== Rebekah Brooks ====
Rebekah Brooks, the former editor of the News of the World and former chief executive of News International, was arrested on 17 July 2011 on suspicion of conspiring to intercept communications and on suspicion of corruption. She was arrested by appointment at a London police station by detectives working on Operation Weeting, the Metropolitan Police's phone hacking investigation, and Operation Elveden, the probe examining illicit payments to police officers.

Following twelve hours in custody, Brooks was released on bail until late October.

On 18 July, police reported the discovery of a rubbish bag containing a laptop, documents, and a phone dumped in an underground parking garage near Brooks' home. Brooks' husband had initially tried to claim the trash bag, which he said contained his property unrelated to the investigation.

Ms. Brooks was arrested again in March 2012, this time on suspicion of conspiracy to pervert the course of justice. Her husband, Charlie Brooks, was arrested with her. Two months later, on 15 May 2012, they were both charged along with four others with conspiracy to pervert the course of justice by allegedly removing documents and computers from News International offices to conceal them from investigating detectives.

On 24 June 2014, Rebekah Brooks was cleared of all charges related to the phone hacking.

==== Stuart Kuttner, Greg Miskiw, James Desborough, Dan Evans and others ====
Stuart Kuttner, the former managing editor of the News of the World, was arrested on 2 August 2011 on suspicion of conspiring to intercept communications and on suspicion of corruption. He was arrested by appointment at a London police station by Operation Weeting and Operation Elveden detectives. (Kuttner was re-arrested 30 August, for further questioning.) On 24 July 2012, he was formally charged with conspiracy to intercept communications between 3 October 2000 to 9 August 2006 without lawful authority regarding communications of Milly Dowler and David Blunkett, MP.

Eight days later, Greg Miskiw, a former News of the World news editor, was arrested on suspicion of unlawful interception of communications and conspiring to intercept communications. He was arrested by appointment at a London police station by detectives working on Operation Weeting, the police investigation into phone hacking. On 24 July 2012, he was charged with conspiracy to intercept communications without lawful authority during the period from 3 October 2000 to 9 August 2006 from the phones of Milly Dowler, Sven-Göran Eriksson, Abi Titmuss, John Leslie Andrew Gilchrist, David Blunkett MP, Delia Smith, Charles Clarke MP, Jude Law, Sadie Frost, Sienna Miller, and Wayne Rooney .

James Desborough was arrested after arriving, by appointment, at a south London police station the morning of 18 August 2011 for questioning concerning criminal activities at the News of the World. His arrest was based on suspicion of conspiring to intercept communications. Desborough was promoted to be the newspaper's Los Angeles-based US editor in 2009. Prior to that appointment, he was an award-winning show-business reporter based in London.

Dan Evans, a former reporter for News of the World, was arrested and later bailed on 19 August 2011. An unnamed 30-year-old man was arrested and later bailed on 2 September 2011.

In an early morning raid on his North London home on 7 September 2011, deputy football editor of The Times Raoul Simons (on extended leave from his job since September 2010) was arrested and held for questioning on suspicion of conspiracy to intercept voicemail messages by police officers from Operation Weeting.

A reporter working for The Sun was arrested and taken to a southwest London police station at 10.30 am on 4 November 2011. The man is the sixth person to be arrested in the UK under the News International-related legal probe, Operation Elveden. The 48-year-old The Sun journalist Jamie Pyatt had been arrested by detectives on 4 November 2011 investigating illegal payments to police officers by journalists and has been released on bail.

==== Jonathan Rees and Alex Marunchak ====
On 2 October 2012, two individuals associated with the earliest investigations (1999) into the phone hacking scandal were arrested. Private investigator Jonathan Rees and News of the World journalist Alex Marunchak were arrested for alleged offences under section 3 of the Computer Misuse Act 1990 and sections 1 and 2 of the Regulation of Investigatory Powers Act 2000 by police officers working on Operation Kalmyk, part of Operation Tuleta dealing with computer hacking. These arrests came thirteen years after Rees' premises were raided under Operation Nigeria, during which large amounts of evidence indicating widespread illegal trafficking in confidential information was seized by the Metropolitan Police Service. Marunchak was arrested by Scotland Yard detectives on 2 October 2012 and remained on bail for 23 months until 16 September 2014 when he was released from bail. In a formal letter to him the following year, on 9 September 2015, the Crown Prosecution Service stated it had "concluded that there is insufficient evidence to provide a realistic prospect of conviction in respect of offences contrary to the Computer Misuse Act (for 'computer hacking' offences)", "that there is insufficient evidence to provide a realistic prospect of conviction for any associated or alternative offences" and "that no further action be taken in relation to this matter". Despite Marunchak's arrest in 2012 he was never charged nor brought to court.

=== Murdochs and Brooks summonsed to Parliament ===
On 14 July, the Culture, Media and Sport Committee of the House of Commons served a summons on Rupert Murdoch, James Murdoch and Rebekah Brooks, expecting them to appear before the parliamentary committee on 19 July. After an initial invitation to give evidence to the committee, Brooks stated she would attend but the Murdochs declined. Rupert Murdoch claimed to be unavailable on that date but said he would be "fully prepared" to give evidence in Leveson's inquiry, while James Murdoch offered to appear on an alternative date, the earliest of which was 10 August. The Murdochs did, however, later confirm they would attend after the committee issued them a summons to Parliament.

Tom Watson and Martin Hickman report in their book Dial M For Murdoch that:

Unbeknown to members of the Culture Committee, the NOTW established a team to investigate their private lives. For several days, as chief reporter Neville Thurlbeck would later tell Tom Watson, reporters searched for any secret lovers or extra-marital affairs that could be used as leverage against the MPs.

Thurlbeck said: "All I know is that, when the DCMS [Department of Culture, Media and Sport Select Committee] was formed or rather when it got onto all the hacking stuff, there was an edict came down from the editor and it was find out every single thing you can about every single member: who was gay, who had affairs, anything we can use.

"Each reporter was given two members and there were six reporters that went on for around 10 days. I don't know who looked at you. It fell by the wayside; I think even Ian Edmondson [the news editor] realised there was something quite horrible about doing this."

At their appearance before the committee, Rupert Murdoch said it had been "the most humble day of my life" and argued that since he ran a global business of 53,000 employees and that the News of the World was "just 1 percent" of this, he was not ultimately responsible for what went on at the tabloid; he added that he had not considered resigning. Meanwhile, his son James described the "illegal voicemail interceptions" as a "matter of great regret" but that the company was "determined to put things right and make sure they do not happen again". James Murdoch stated that News International had based its "push back" against new allegations on the combination of three pieces of evidence: that the Metropolitan Police had closed their investigation, that the Crown Prosecution Service had closed their prosecution and that they had received written advice from their legal advisors Harbottle & Lewis, that there was nothing to suggest phone hacking was not the work of one "rogue reporter" working with private investigator Glenn Mulcaire. Towards the end of the Murdochs' two hours of evidence, a protester sitting in the public gallery, identified as comedian Jonnie Marbles, threw a shaving-foam pie at Rupert Murdoch. The incident propelled Murdoch's wife, Wendi Deng Murdoch, into the media spotlight for her athletic response in defence of her husband. Marbles later said that he had "much respect" for Deng for fighting back. Marbles, real name Jonathan May-Bowles, was sentenced to six weeks in prison for the attack.

Harbottle & Lewis later commented that it could not respond to "any inaccurate statements or contentions" about the 2007 letter to News International due to client confidentiality. Later on the same day, giving evidence to the Home Affairs Select Committee, former director of public prosecutions Lord MacDonald stated that it took him "three to five minutes" to decide that the same emails contained in the file passed to Harbottle & Lewis contained "blindingly obvious" evidence of corrupt payments to police officers, which had to be immediately passed to the Metropolitan Police.

Brooks answered questions at the committee after the Murdochs and independently of them. She began by calling the practice of phone hacking at the newspaper she edited as "pretty horrific". Upon questioning, she confirmed that under her editorship she knew the News of the World hired private detectives but denied having ever met Glenn Mulcaire.

The testimony of James Murdoch was questioned by two former News International executives. Murdoch had denied reading or being aware of an email, sent after he authorised an out-of-court payment to Gordon Taylor over the hacking of his phone, which suggested the practice was more widely used than just by a rogue News of the World reporter. A former editor of the newspaper, Colin Myler and Tom Crone, the former News International legal manager, both said they "did inform" him of the email.

=== News Corporation's management standards committee ===
On 18 July, News Corporation announced that its UK management standards committee would be removed from News International. It will now be housed in a separate building, under the chairmanship of Lord Grabiner, and reporting to News Corporation director Joel Klein. As a result, existing News International executives William Lewis and Simon Greenberg will resign their existing positions with News International and become News Corporation employees, focused initially on the clean-up of News International. In September 2011 it was reported that the MSC was not issuing employees of News International who had had their contracts terminated with the reasons for their dismissal in case this would compromise the ongoing police inquiry.

=== Death of Sean Hoare ===
On 18 July, former News of the World journalist Sean Hoare, who was the first reporter to tell of "endemic" phone hacking at the publication for which he used to work, was found dead at his home in Watford, Hertfordshire. A police spokesperson said the death was treated as "unexplained" but not suspicious. In November 2011, the coroner for Hertfordshire concluded that Hoare died of natural causes after suffering from liver disease.

=== Daily Mirror allegations ===
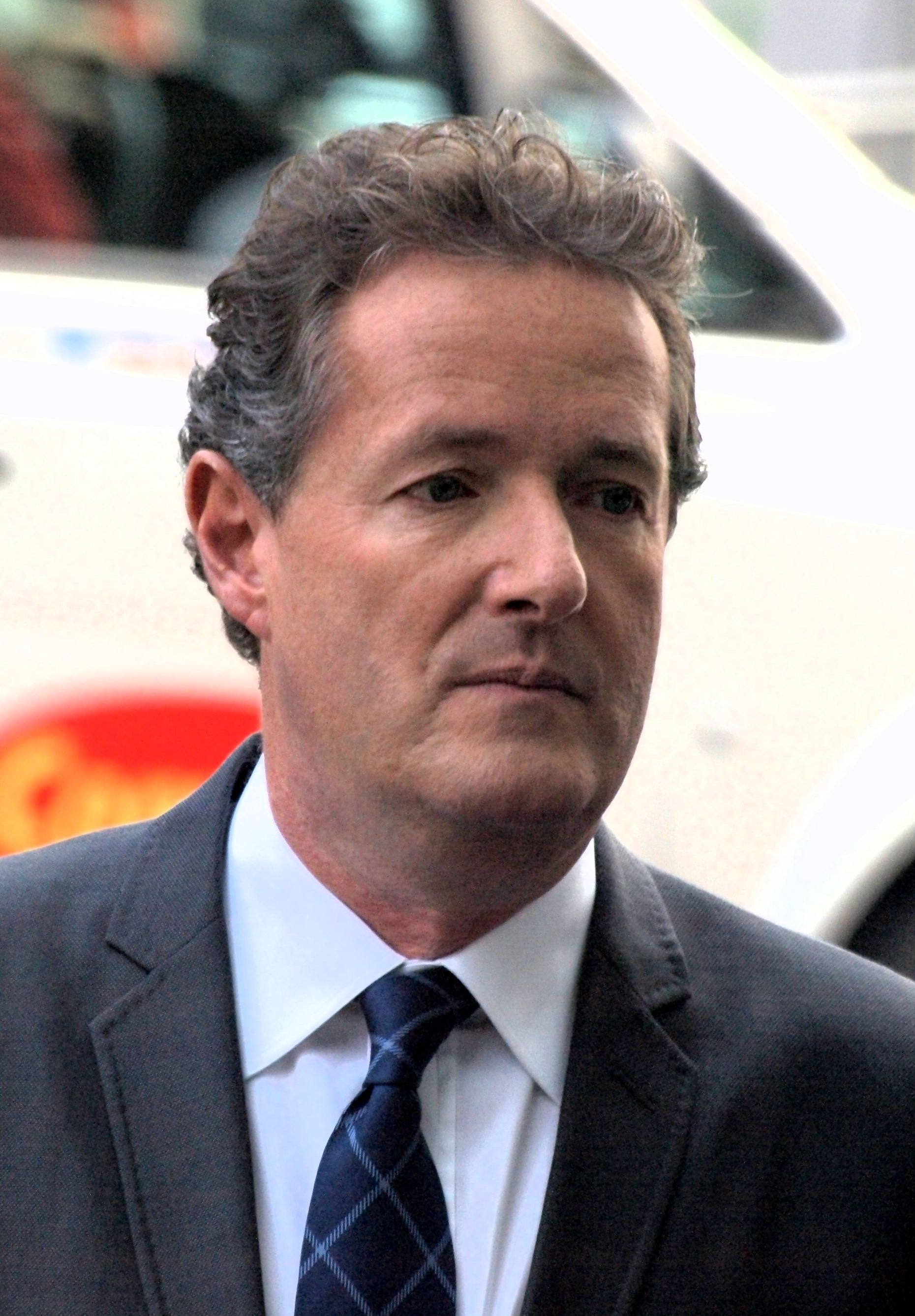
Piers Morgan was editor of The Daily Mirror from 1995 to 2004.

On 20 July, Private Eye asked how the Sunday Mirror had, early in 2003, obtained a transcript of phone calls by Angus Deayton and in October 2003 had come into possession of every call and text message made by Rio Ferdinand one afternoon (when he claimed to have missed a drugs test due to having his mobile switched off). The latter story was co-written by James Weatherup, who moved to the News of the World the following year.

On 22 July, former Daily Mirror financial journalist James Hipwell spoke to The Independent, claiming that the practice had been "endemic" at the Mirror during his time there under the editorship of Piers Morgan.

"They would call a celebrity with one phone and when it was answered they would then hang up. ... After they'd hacked into someone's mobile, they'd delete the message so another paper couldn't get the story. There was great hilarity about it."

He also alleged that phone hacking took place at some of the Mirror's sister publications. Trinity Mirror, the publisher of the Daily Mirror and Sunday Mirror, rejected Hipwell's claims. A spokesman said: "Our position is clear.... Our journalists work within the criminal law and the Press Complaints Commission code of conduct." The BBC's Newsnight programme reported other sources at the Sunday Mirror confirming use of phone hacking, with one source saying "At one point in 2004, it seemed like it was the only way people were getting scoops." It was also said that the paper made use of private investigators. On 26 July Trinity Mirror announced an internal review of its editorial procedures.

On 3 August, Heather Mills alleged that a senior journalist working for Trinity Mirror had admitted to her in 2001 that the company had access to voicemail messages which they knew to have been obtained by hacking. In response Trinity Mirror repeated the statement used in rejecting James Hipwell's claims, saying "Our position is clear. All our journalists work within the criminal law and the PCC code of conduct."

Also on 3 August, Piers Morgan issued a statement through CNN, his employer, that "I have never hacked a phone, told anyone to hack a phone, nor to my knowledge published any story obtained from the hacking of a phone." The statement omitted comment on whether he had any knowledge of phone hacking by employees or paid contractors of the Mirror during the period he was editor there.

That Morgan did have knowledge of phone hacking is suggested in his own 2006 article in the Daily Mail, regarding a phone message from Paul McCartney to his girlfriend Heather Mills. On 3 August, Heather Mills told BBC's Newsnight: "There was absolutely no honest way that Piers Morgan could have obtained that tape ... unless they had gone into my voice messages."

=== Harbottle and Lewis ===
During the internal investigation into the unfair dismissal claim against News Group Newspapers Limited by Clive Goodman, News International hired law firm Harbottle & Lewis (H&L) and passed on hundreds of internal emails to them. Lawrence Abramson of Harbottle & Lewis wrote a letter on 29 May 2007, to News International head of legal affairs Jon Chapman, which said that they had:

reviewed e-mails to which you have provided access from the accounts of Andy Coulson, Stuart Kuttner, Ian Edmondson, Clive Goodman, Neil Wallis, Jules Stenson... did not find anything in those e-mails which appeared to us to be reasonable evidence that Clive Goodman's illegal actions were known about and supported by both or either of Andy Coulson, the editor, and Neil Wallis, the deputy editor, and/or that Ian Edmondson, the news editor, and others were carrying out similar illegal procedures.

The letter from Abramson to Chapman makes no mention of whether the e-mails contain evidence of wrongdoing by journalists other than Goodman.

It was reported that NI executives urged H&L to give them a clean bill of health in the strongest possible terms, that earlier draft letters by H&L were rejected by NI and that lawyers on both sides seemed to struggle to find language that said the review had found no evidence of wrongdoing. This information was provided by "two people familiar with both the contents of the e-mails and the discussions between the executives and the law firm". This letter was used by various News International executives in their defence during a parliamentary investigation into phone hacking in 2009.

In July 2011, Rupert Murdoch alleged in interview with The Wall Street Journal that H&L made "a major mistake" in its part in an internal investigation into phone-hacking at News International. On 18 July 2011, H&L issued an open letter outlining its position, and appointed Luther Pendragon to handle PR issues relating to the affair. On 19 July, Lord MacDonald the former Director of Public Prosecutions engaged by News Corporation to review the emails handed to Harbottle & Lewis in 2007, said in evidence to the Home Affairs Select Committee:

I have to tell you that the material I saw was so blindingly obvious that anyone trying to argue that it shouldn't be given to the police would have had a very tough task.

At his appearance before the Culture, Media and Sport Committee on 19 July, James Murdoch stated that News International had based its "push back" against new allegations on the combination of three pieces of evidence and one of these was the written advice from H&L.

On 20 July, H&L issued a statement saying that they had asked News International to release them from their professional duty of confidentiality, which had been declined by News International. The company had since written to John Whittingdale MP, chairman of the Culture, Media and Sport Committee, asking to provide evidence to the committee.

On 21 July, News International authorised H&L to answer questions from the Metropolitan Police Service and parliamentary select committees in respect of what they were asked to do. Neil Rose, editor of legalfutures.co.uk, commented that the exact form of News International's waiver means H&L will not be able to declare its innocence but only answer questions by the police or parliament.

On 22 July, Tom Watson MP published a letter from the Solicitors Regulation Authority, in response to his letter expressing concerns about Harbottle and Lewis's part in the phone-hacking affair. In the letter, Anthony Townsend, chief executive of the SRA said:

On the basis of our preliminary review of the public domain material, we have decided to instigate a formal investigation. We will pursue our investigation vigorously and thoroughly, but emphasise that our inquiries are at an early stage, and that no conclusions have been reached about whether there may have been any impropriety by any solicitor.

The Culture, Media and Sport Committee wrote to H&L on 29 July asking a series of detailed questions about the interaction between NI and H&L. H&L replied to this request on 11 August. in what was described as "a withering attack on News International and the Murdochs".

H&L said that it provided very narrow advice on whether the emails in question could be used to support Clive Goodman's allegations, that his illegal activities were known about and supported by other employees at NOTW. They were not retained to provide NI with a "good conduct certificate" which they could show to parliament. H&L state that the terms of their contract with NI explicitly stated that their advice should not be disclosed to a third party without H&L's written consent. They also state that if NI "had approached them (as it should have done) before presenting the letter to Parliament as evidence of its corporate innocence, H&L would not have agreed to this without further discussion". They also state that they could not have reported NI to the police even if they had found evidence of criminal activity in the emails, because of client confidentiality. Their fee for the work was £10,294 + VAT. The letter suggests that this amount be compared with James Murdoch's evidence where he said that he had been told that the litigation costs in the Gordon Taylor and Max Clifford cases were expected to be between £500,000 and £1m.

=== Criminal charges and convictions ===
Charges and a total of seven convictions concerning the illegal acquisition of confidential information were made in three separate waves in 2004–2005, 2006 and 2012. Further convictions resulted from the R v Coulson, Brooks and others trial which concluded in July 2014.

Between February 2004 and April 2005, the Crown Prosecution Service charged ten men working for private detective agencies with crimes relating to the illegal acquisition of confidential information. No journalists were charged. Three private investigators and two of their sources pleaded guilty or were otherwise convicted. Steve Whittamore and John Boyall pleaded guilty to breaching the Data Protection Act 1998. Alan King and Paul Marshall pleaded guilty to conspiracy to commit misconduct in a public office. John Gunning was convicted of acquiring private subscriber information from British Telecom's database. Most of the evidence obtained during these investigations remained unevaluated at Scotland Yard for ten years. Boyall's assistant was Glenn Mulcaire until the autumn of 2001, when News of the World's assistant editor, Greg Miskiw, attracted Mulcaire away by giving him a full-time contract to do work for the newspaper.

In August 2006, private investigator Glenn Mulcaire and News of the World Royal editor Clive Goodman were arrested. During their court proceedings, a small number of other victims of Mulcaire's phone hacking were mentioned, including Sky Andrew, Max Clifford, Simon Hughes, Elle Macpherson, and Gordon Taylor. On 29 November 2006, Goodman and Mulcaire pleaded guilty to conspiracy to intercept communications without lawful authority with respect to three of the royal aides. It was clear from court testimony that Mulcaire had hacked at least five other phones and that he did work for more than just Goodman.

On 15 May 2012, the Crown Prosecution Service (CPS) charged six individuals with conspiring to pervert the course of justice. Charged in relation to removal of documents and computers to conceal them from investigating detectives were former News International CEO Rebekah Brooks, her husband, her personal assistant, her bodyguard, her chauffeur and the head of security at News International. These charges were made about one year after the Metropolitan Police Service reopened its dormant investigation into phone hacking, about three years after the then Assistant Commissioner of the Metropolitan Police Service told the Commons Culture, Media and Sport Committee that "no additional evidence has come to light", five years after News International executives began claiming that phone hacking was the work of a single "rogue reporter", ten years after The Guardian began reporting that the Met had evidence of widespread illegal acquisition of confidential information, and 13 years after the Met began accumulating "boxloads" of that evidence but kept it unexamined in bin bags at Scotland Yard.

On 24 July 2012, charges were brought against eight former employees and agents of the News of the World including editors Rebekah Brooks and Andy Coulson. Of the thirteen suspects that had been referred to the Crown Prosecution Service by the Metropolitan Police Service for review under Operation Weeting, eight were charged with a total of nineteen charges, three were not to be pursued due to insufficient evidence, and two were to continue to be investigated. Seven of the eight were "charged with conspiring to intercept communications without lawful authority from 3rd October 2000 to 9th August 2006." All eight were charged regarding illegal interception of communications relating to specific individuals

The trial R v Coulson, Brooks and others began in October 2013. In December 2013 the trial judge announced that Ian Edmondson was unwell and that his case would be considered at a separate hearing when he recovered.

On 24 June 2014 the trial jury found Coulson guilty of one charge of conspiracy to hack phones and failed to agree a verdict on two other charges in relation to the alleged purchase of confidential royal phone directories in 2005 from a police officer. Brooks and the five remaining defendants were found not guilty. On 30 June 2014 the trial judge announced that Coulson and Clive Goodman, would face a retrial on the outstanding charges.

Sentences were announced on 4 July 2014, with Coulson receiving 18 months imprisonment, former chief reporter Neville Thurlbeck and news editor Greg Miskiw sentences of six months each, former reporter James Weatherup a four-month suspended sentence and former private investigator Glenn Mulcaire a six-month suspended sentence. Weatherup and Mulcaire also received 200 hours of community service.

On 3 October 2014, Ian Edmondson pleaded guilty to conspiring with Glenn Mulcaire and others to intercept private voicemails between 3 October 2000 and 9 August 2006. Edmondson was jailed for eight months on 7 November 2014.

=== Financial losses ===
In 2025, The Guardian reported that News Group Newspapers had accumulated over £1.2 billion in losses since the start of the illegal phone hacking legal cases almost 15 years previously.

== Further UK investigations ==
The scandal has triggered multiple investigations from various governmental agencies looking at other News Corporation-owned media outlets in addition to News of the World.

With the unfolding scandal at the News of the World came allegations that another News Corporation-owned tabloid, The Sun, itself engaged in phone hacking. In February 2011, the Metropolitan Police investigated the claims of Scottish trade union leader Andy Gilchrist, who accused The Sun of hacking into his mobile phone to run negative stories about him; the stories were published shortly after Rebekah Brooks was installed as the paper's editor.

On 5 July 2011, the head of the Press Complaints Commission Baroness Buscombe said in interview with Andrew Neil on the BBC programme The Daily Politics, that she had been lied to by the News of the World over phone hacking. Buscombe said that she did not know the extent of the scandal when she joined the PCC in 2009, but stated that she had been "misled by the News of the World" after she had previously concluded just the opposite. Buscome further admitted that her statement put out in 2009, when the PCC had reviewed the 2007 evidence, that "Having reviewed all the information available, we concluded that we were not materially misled;" was now in hindsight incorrect. This led to Labour leader Ed Miliband calling the PCC a "toothless poodle", and in agreement with Prime Minister David Cameron proposed the creation of a new press watchdog.

On 11 July, the day after the News of the World ceased publication, The Guardian reported that Scotland Yard was investigating both The Sun and The Sunday Times for illegally gaining access to the financial, phone, and legal records of former prime minister Gordon Brown. It was also reported that The Sun improperly obtained medical information on Brown's infant son to publish stories about his diagnosis of cystic fibrosis. Brown issued a statement saying that his family was "shocked by the level of criminality and the unethical means by which personal details have been obtained". On 22 July, the satirical and investigative magazine Private Eye reported that sometime between 2001 and 2004, a PR man for the BBC series EastEnders had suspected his voicemail was being intercepted. The Eye said that the man's suspicions were confirmed when he had a friend leave a voicemail concerning a fake story about EastEnders, and that same evening received call from a Sun reporter declaring that they had "proof" of the fake story.

=== Leveson inquiry ===
On 6 July 2011, Prime Minister David Cameron announced to parliament that a public government inquiry would convene to further investigate the affair. On 13 July, Cameron named Lord Justice Leveson as chairman of the inquiry, with a remit to look into the specific claims about phone hacking at the News of the World, the initial police inquiry and allegations of illicit payments to police by the press, and a second inquiry to review the general culture and ethics of the British media.

On 20 July 2011, Cameron announced to Parliament the final terms of reference of Leveson's inquiry, stating that it will extend beyond newspapers to include broadcasters and social media. He also announced a panel of six people who will work with the judge on the inquiry:

It was subsequently reported in the media that Leveson had attended two parties in the prior 12 months at the London home of Matthew Freud, a PR executive married to Elisabeth Murdoch, the daughter of Rupert Murdoch.

=== Home Affairs Select Committee ===
The Home Affairs Select Committee (HASC) has taken various forms of evidence and undertaking during the whole affair, and continues to investigate various aspects as part of its normal parliamentary undertakings.

On the afternoon of 19 July 2011, the HASC took evidence from both holders of the position of the Director of Public Prosecutions, for the period which covered the scandal. Lord Macdonald, in charge of the Crown Prosecution Service when prosecution of Goodman and Mulcaire was undertaken, stated that he had only been alerted to the case due to the convention that the DPP is always notified of crimes involving the royal family. Committee member Mark Reckless, the then Conservative MP for Rochester and Strood, stated that the original 2007 police investigation and the 2009 review had both been hindered by the advice from the CPS, that "phone hacking was only an offence if messages had been intercepted before they were listened to by the intended recipient;" which was in fact incorrect. The DPP Keir Starmer in evidence stated that the CPS had told the Metropolitan Police that "the RIPA legislation was untested."

Mark Lewis, the solicitor acting for a number of phone hacking victims including the family of Milly Dowler, stated in evidence that he was sacked from his job when fellow partners at his law firm stated they no longer wished to pursue other victims' claims. Lewis stated that he, The Guardian newspaper, and Labour MP Chris Bryant had all been threatened to be sued by solicitors Carter-Ruck acting for AC John Yates, all the costs for which after the actions were dropped were picked up by the Metropolitan Police; Lewis submitted letters from Carter Ruck in evidence to the committee. In closing, Lewis stated that the reason for the investigation having taken so long was not only due to the Metropolitan Police: "The DPP seems to have got it wrong and needs to be helped out."

On 20 July 2011, the HASC published their completed report on the UK Parliament website. In that report, the Committee says:

"We deplore the response of News International to the original investigation into hacking. It is almost impossible to escape the conclusion voiced by Mr Clarke that they were deliberately trying to thwart a criminal investigation."

=== Mark Lewis ===
Lewis, who is not connected with the Harbotte & Lewis firm, first engaged with News of the World in 2005 when it was moving to print a story asserting marital infidelity on Gordon Taylor's part. Lewis worked for George Davies Solicitors LLP in Manchester specialising in defamation cases and was able to persuade the paper not to run the story. In 2006, in the criminal trial over the hacking of royals' voicemail accounts, it became public that the paper had also hacked, among others, Taylor's voicemail. In his "eureka moment", Lewis realised then that it was hacked information which had led to the earlier story about Taylor. From that insight came the realisation that the paper had a potential civil liability from its hacking practices, and that led to Taylor's civil case. In 2011, working now with Taylor Hampton Solicitors in London, Lewis seems about to close a $4.7 million settlement in the Dowler case and has "more than 70 clients who believe News of the World illegally intercepted their cellphone voice mails", according to a Wall Street Journal story.

=== Culture, Media and Sport Select Committee ===
The Culture, Media and Sport Committee spent 6 September 2011 questioning four witnesses: the News of the World's former editor Colin Myler, News Group Newspapers' former legal manager Tom Crone, its former group human resources director Daniel Cloke, and News International's former director of legal affairs Jonathan Chapman.

In September 2016, the Commons privileges committee stated that Colin Myler and Tom Crone had misled the Culture, Media and Sport Committee during that meeting by "answering questions falsely", and found them found in contempt of parliament. Myler and Crone rejected this finding.

=== Independent Police Complaints Commission ===
The Independent Police Complaints Commission has been charged or filed to perform various investigations. These presently include:

- An investigation of the relationship between Commissioner Sir Paul Stephenson and Neil Wallis, and the Commissioner's stay at Champneys health resort
- An investigation into the conduct of Assistant Commissioner John Yates, with regards his review of the original investigation in 2009
- An investigation into the conduct of Deputy Assistant Commissioner Peter Clarke, with regards his conduct within the original investigation in 2007
- An investigation into the conduct of Assistant Commissioner Andy Hayman, with regards his conduct within the original investigation in 2007
- An investigation into Met Police head of PR Dick Fedorcio, his links with Neil Wallis, and the circumstances under which the Metropolitan Police awarded a contract to Wallis's media consultancy firm Chamy Media
- An investigation of the employment of Neil Wallis's daughter Amy with the Metropolitan Police, alleged to have been at the request of John Yates

=== Elizabeth Filkin ===
On 18 July 2011, it was announced that former parliamentary commissioner for standards Elizabeth Filkin would "recommend changes to links between the police and the media, including how to extend transparency".

=== Clive Goodman's 2007 letter ===
It was revealed that both John Whittingdale and Tom Watson may need to speak to James Murdoch again as the Commons culture select committee about recalling James Murdoch. An MP has released a letter from the now jailed journalist, alleging senior News of the World figures knew that the hacking scandal was going on, when the former royal editor, Clive Goodman, wrote his letter to News International as he appealed against his dismissal in 2007.

"The News of the World's legal manager Tom Crone attended virtually every meeting of my legal team and was given full access to the Crown Prosecution Service's evidence files." according to Clive Goodman's letter.

== Ethical concerns, legal concerns and possible implications ==
=== Criticism of News International culture ===
The effect of the phone hacking scandal originating with the News of the World also raised wider questions about the ethics employed by companies under Murdoch's ownership, as well as the effects the scandal will have on the ethics employed specifically by print journalists and to some extent the wider world of journalism.

Murdoch had previously been criticised for building a media empire that lacked any ethical base and replacing responsible journalism with "gossip, sensationalism, and manufactured controversy." Karl Grossman, a professor of journalism at State University of New York at Old Westbury, accused Murdoch of building the most "dishonest, unprincipled and corrupt" media empire in history and of "making a travesty of what journalism is supposed to be about". Grossman also claimed that News Corporation changes the culture of their newly acquired news outlets, using them to promote Murdoch's political and financial interests. Once-acclaimed newspapers such as the New York Post, The Wall Street Journal, and The Times have been accused of becoming an "instrument" to aide politicians that Murdoch favours.

In Newsweek in July 2011, one of Murdoch's former top executives was quoted as saying: "This scandal and all its implications could not have happened anywhere else. Only in Murdoch's orbit. The hacking at News of the World was done on an industrial scale. More than anyone, Murdoch invented and established this culture in the newsroom, where you do whatever it takes to get the story, take no prisoners, destroy the competition, and the end will justify the means." This same executive went on to say, "In the end, what you sow is what you reap. Now Murdoch is a victim of the culture that he created. It is a logical conclusion, and it is his people at the top who encouraged lawbreaking and hacking phones and condoned it."

In 2010, it was also suggested that the journalistic approach of such newspapers at the News of the World had brought into public focus that there had been a shift away from the traditional ethics of journalism, raising serious questions about privacy, freedom of speech, and confidentiality. There were also observations in the North American Press about the ethics employed by the News of the World. NBC New York noted that the old journalistic maxim, "Get it first. But, first, get it right," although speaking for accurate reporting does not address the situation where in the case of the News of the World information was allegedly obtained in an unethical way or by illegal means. The approach was also criticised by Stephen B. Shepard, dean of the CUNY Graduate School of Journalism, who commenting on the phone hacking scandal, said: "It's wrong. It's not a grey area. What they did was illegal and, even if it weren't, it's just plain wrong. There's no defence for it. Even the government needs a warrant to get into a house or a computer. You can't break into something like this and get away with it."

=== Ethical backlash ===
Prime Minister David Cameron first intimated in early July 2011 that an investigation by Parliament on media ethics and standards will be carried out. Soon after he announced that two independent enquiries, led by a senior judge would take place. This led to anxieties being expressed by newspaper editors about the impact of state media regulation on the free press. There was also concerns amongst journalists that new regulations would be enacted as a means of reining in the press—"an attack on the power of the press itself"—rather than more effective self-regulation and ensuring a stricter enforcement of existing legislation to deter the use of phone hacking, breaches of privacy laws and bribery of public officials. A further major concern was expressed that more stringent regulation will not assist the ordinary people who were the subject of investigative journalism, whereas powerful corporations will still have the money, power, and resources to get out of any tough situation they might encounter.

The consequences of the exposure of ethical transgressions that occurred at News of the World have also led to concerns that such practices could be happening at other News Corporation titles in Britain. Furthermore, there has been speculation that American news companies that are a part of Rupert Murdoch's media empire may have become implicated.

In July 2011 the Ethical Investment Advisory Group (EIAG) of the Church of England, England's established church, issued a statement stating that "The behaviour of the News of the World has been utterly reprehensible and unethical." In August 2012 the EIAG further announced that it had no confidence in News Corporation's stated intention of returning to ethical practices, and that as a result all Church of England organisations would cease investment in News Corporation. In practical terms this involved the Church Commissioners and the Church of England Pensions Board in selling shareholdings valued at around £1.9 million.

== Impact in other countries ==
=== Australia ===
==== News Limited announces review ====
In light of News Corporations global review, John Hartigan, the CEO of News Corporation's Australian company News Limited, announced a review of all payments in the previous three years, and that he was personally willing to co-operate with any Australian Government led inquiry. The Australian Green party called for a parliamentary inquiry into News Limited, but Hartigan directly denied allegations by both the Greens and the governing Labor party that News Limited has been running a campaign against them, describing his group's journalism as "aggressive but fair".

==== Australian Government announces formal review ====
While the scope of the enquiry was yet to be finalised, a spokesman for the Communications Minister, Stephen Conroy, said that the current administration under the Labor Party had decided that an investigation was required.

The News Limited chairman, John Hartigan, vowed full co-operation with the government inquiry.

=== United States ===
In the United States, where News Corporation is headquartered and operates multiple media outlets, the Federal Bureau of Investigation launched a probe on 14 July 2011, to determine whether News Corporation accessed voicemails of victims of the 9/11 attacks. On 15 July, US Attorney General Eric Holder announced an additional investigation by the Department of Justice, looking into whether the company had violated the Foreign Corrupt Practices Act.

News Corporation owns a multitude of news outlets in the United States, including the New York Post, The Wall Street Journal, and the Fox News Channel. Several media critics, as ProtectOurElections.org lawyer Kevin Zeese, have called for investigations into whether they too engaged in phone hacking activities. In addition to any possible illegal activities in the US, News Corporation and/or its executives might also face civil and criminal liability under the Foreign Corrupt Practices Act.

In 2005, US Senator Frank Lautenberg (D-NJ) wrote to Attorney General Alberto Gonzales after a small New Jersey marketing company called FLOOR graphics alleged that News America Marketing engaged in illegal computer espionage by breaking into password protected computer systems and obtaining confidential information. Further controversy was aroused by an unsigned editorial in the News Corporation-owned Wall Street Journal which lashed out against the company's critics, specifically mentioning the BBC, The Guardian, and the news website ProPublica. At the same time, the editorial praised former Journal publisher Les Hinton, who had just resigned in the wake of the phone hacking scandal. Many observers were frustrated by The Wall Street Journal's comments. In tweets, Jay Rosen, professor of journalism at New York University, referred to the "deluded dishonest whining victimology delivered in the form of a Wall Street Journal editorial on the phone hacking crisis" and Sarah Ellison of Vanity Fair commented: "Tonite's WSJ Editorial is sad. I've always defended the Edit page, but now it's a PR arm."

== In popular culture ==
The scandal was dramatised in the 2025 ITV series, The Hack.

The 2015 independent thriller Chasing Robert Barker, directed by Daniel Florêncio, is set within the world of corrupted tabloid editors and remains the only British narrative feature film to directly address the phone-hacking scandal.

== Timeline ==
Key events in the scandal to date:

- February 2010: A Culture, Media and Sport select committee report finds no evidence that News of the World editor Andy Coulson knew of phone hacking taking place at his publication. It does however say it is "inconceivable" that no one apart from royal editor Clive Goodman was aware of it.
- 9 March 2010: The Guardian reports that publicist Max Clifford was paid £1 million to drop legal action that could have revealed more News of the World reporters hacked phones.
- 1 September 2010: The New York Times quotes Sean Hoare, a former News of the World reporter, as claiming phone hacking was encouraged at the tabloid; he also tells the BBC that phone hacking was "endemic" at the paper and that Coulson asked him to do it. Paul McMullan, another former journalist at the News of the World, claims that other illegal reporting techniques were widespread.
- 5 January 2011: The News of the World suspends assistant news editor Ian Edmondson over hacking allegations. Private investigator Glenn Mulcaire claimed Edmondson commissioned him to hack phones.
- April 2011: Edmondson, journalist James Weatherup and senior reporter Neville Thurlbeck are all arrested on suspicion of conspiring to intercept communications and unlawfully accessing voicemail messages.
- April 2011 – June 2011: Several claimants, including actress Sienna Miller and football pundit Andy Gray, receive damages from the News of the World.
- 4 July 2011: The Guardian reports that the voice mail of murdered schoolgirl Milly Dowler was hacked by the News of the World. Rebekah Brooks was editor of the tabloid at the time but said it is "inconceivable" that she knew of the activity.
- 6 July 2011: The Telegraph reports that relatives of the 7/7 attack victims were also hacked.
- 6 July 2011: Prime Minister David Cameron announces a government inquiry into the unfolding scandal.
- 7 July 2011: The Telegraph reports that relatives of British soldiers killed in action were hacked.
- 7 July 2011: The Royal British Legion announce it is severing all ties with the News of the World.
- 7 July 2011: News International announce the closure of the News of the World, with the last edition to be published on 10 July.
- 8 July 2011: Andy Coulson is arrested over alleged phone hacking and making illegal payments to police. Clive Goodman is also arrested on suspicion of making illegal payments to police.
- 11 July 2011: The Guardian reports two other News Corporation outlets may have illegally accessed records of former Prime Minister Gordon Brown.
- 13 July 2011: News Corporation withdraw their bid to take over BSkyB.
- 14 July 2011: Former News of the World executive editor Neil Wallis arrested.
- 15 July 2011: Rebekah Brooks, chief executive of News International, and Les Hinton, chief executive of Dow Jones & Company, both resign.
- 17 July 2011: Brooks arrested over corruption and phone hacking.
- 17 July 2011: Sir Paul Stephenson resigns as Commissioner of the Metropolitan Police Service.
- 18 July 2011: David Cameron postpones parliamentary recess by one day.
- 18 July 2011: John Yates resigns as Assistant Commissioner (Specialist Operations).
- 18 July 2011: Former News of the World reporter and the first to allege phone hacking at the publication, Sean Hoare, is found dead at his home in Hertfordshire.
- 18 July 2011: Home Secretary Theresa May tells the House of Commons she has launched an inquiry into malpractices and alleged corruption within the Police.
- 19 July 2011: Brooks, Rupert Murdoch and James Murdoch appear before the House of Commons Culture, Media and Sport Committee.
- 20 July 2011: Culture, Media and Sport Committee report released; Cameron appears in parliament and at the 1922 Committee.
- 20 July 2011: Matt Nixson dismissed as features editor of The Sun newspaper.
- 22 July 2011: The Solicitors Regulation Authority announce an investigation into Harbottle & Lewis, the former solicitors of News International.
- 2 August 2011: Former News of the World managing editor Stuart Kuttner arrested.
- 10 August 2011: Former News of the World news editor Greg Miskiw arrested.
- 10 August 2011: Director of Public Affairs for the Metropolitan Police, Dick Fedorcio, put on extended leave.
- 16 August 2011: The Guardian publishes a letter by Clive Goodman that implicates senior staffers at the News of the World, including Coulson, in extensively discussing and covering-up phone hacking.
- 18 August 2011: Former News of the World US editor James Desborough arrested.
- 18 August 2011: Glenn Mulcaire begins legal action against News International.
- 19 August 2011: Former News of the World reporter Dan Evans arrested.
- 29 August 2011: News Corporation subsidiary Wireless Generation loses New York State contract for education information system provision.
- 30 August 2011: Former News of the World managing editor Stuart Kuttner re-arrested and bailed until a date in September 2011.
- 2 September 2011: Ross Hall, a former reporter for News of the World who wrote under the pen name Ross Hindley, is arrested.
- 6 September 2011: Daniel Cloke, Jonathan Chapman, Colin Myler and Tom Crone are questioned by the House of Commons Culture, Media and Sport Committee.
- 6 September 2011: Leveson inquiry has first hearing.
- 7 September 2011: Deputy football Editor of The Times, Raoul Simons, arrested.
- 13 September 2011: Australian Government announces formal inquiry into behaviour of the Australian media.
- 14 September 2011: House of Commons Culture, Media and Sport Committee decide to recall James Murdoch and Les Hinton for further questioning.
- 14 September 2011: The Leveson Inquiry provides background, scope, and procedural plans for the inquiry.
- 10 November 2011: James Murdoch appears before the House of Commons Culture, Media and Sport Committee.
- 21 November 2011: Leveson inquiry receives witness testimony from the family of Milly Dowler, solicitor Graham Shear, writer Joan Smith, and actor Hugh Grant.
- 13 December 2011: James Murdoch questioned by the House of Commons Culture, Media and Sport Committee.
- 28 January 2012: The former Managing Editor of The Sun Graham Dudman, Head of News Chris Pharo, Crime Editor Mike Sullivan and former Deputy Editor Fergus Shanahan are all arrested.
- 11 February 2012: The Sun picture editor John Edwards, senior reporter John Kay, chief foreign correspondent Nick Parker, reporter John Sturgis and deputy editor Geoff Webster, as well as a serving British Army major, his wife who works for the Ministry of Defence, and a serving police officer are all arrested.
- 17 February 2012: Rupert Murdoch flies to London to meet staff from The Sun who are angry at the arrests.
- 1 March 2012: James Murdoch resigns as executive chairman of News International and as chairman of BSkyB.
- 2 March 2012: Police arrest The Sun's defence editor Virginia Wheeler.
- 7 March 2012: Reports appear that two Sun journalists made suicide attempts.
- 13 March 2012: Former News Corp. executive Rebekah Brooks arrested, along with her husband and four others.
- 29 March 2012: Dick Fedorcio, Director of Public Affairs for the Metropolitan Police, resigns after proceedings for gross misconduct are started against him.
- 19 April 2012: Police arrest The Sun's royal editor Duncan Larcombe. Also arrested are a 42-year-old man who served in the British Army and a 38-year-old woman.
- 26 April 2012: The Ofcom probe moves from a monitoring phase to an "evidence gathering" phase.
- 3 May 2012: Police arrest a retired police officer on suspicion of accepting payments.
- 14 May 2012: Police arrest a 50-year-old man who works for HM Revenue and Customs and a 43-year-old woman.
- 25 May 2012: Clodagh Hartley, The Sun's Whitehall editor, is arrested.
- 30 May 2012: Andy Coulson is detained by police and charged with perjury.
- 14 June 2012: The Sun journalist Neil Millard, a 40-year-old prison officer, and a 37-year-old woman are arrested. A police superintendent who is serving in the City of London Police is arrested on charges of corruption.
- 28 June 2012: A 31-year-old man who is a National Health Service employee is arrested on the charge of corruption.
- 5 July 2012: Daily Mirror reporter Grieg Box-Turnbull, as well as a 45-year-old male prison officer and a 50-year-old woman, are arrested on suspicion of bribery and misconduct in public office. Later a 52-year-old female Scotland Yard police officer who is serving in Specialist Operations is arrested on suspicion of receiving illegal payments from journalists.
- 6 July 2012: A 46-year-old man and a 42-year-old woman who both work for the National Health Service are arrested in Somerset. A 26-year-old man who is a Murdoch employee is arrested in Surrey.
- 12 July 2012: Police arrest the Sunday Mirror's crime reporter Justin Penrose and the Daily Star Sunday's deputy news editor Tom Savage on suspicion of corruption and conspiracy to cause misconduct in public office.
- 19 July 2012: Police arrest a journalist from The Sun.
- 22 July 2012: Rupert Murdoch resigns as News International director.
- 24 July 2012: Andy Coulson and Rebekah Brooks are charged over phone hacking. Also charged are Stuart Kuttner, former managing editor of News of the World; Ian Edmondson, news editor; Greg Miskiw, news editor; Neville Thurlbeck, chief reporter; James Weatherup, assistant news editor; and Glenn Mulcaire, private investigator.
- 30 July 2012: Nick Parker, The Sun's chief foreign correspondent, is arrested and released on bail. Also arrested is a 29-year-old serving police officer from Sussex Police.
- 16 August 2012: Andy Coulson, Stuart Kuttner, Ian Edmondson, Greg Miskiw, Neville Thurlbeck, James Weatherup, and Glenn Mulcaire all appear at City of Westminster Magistrates' Court charged with phone hacking.
- 29 August 2012: The Times journalist Patrick Foster is arrested on suspicion of computer hacking and Bob Bird, former News of the World Scotland Editor, is arrested for perjury and phone hacking.
- 30 August 2012: Tom Crone, legal manager at News of the World, is arrested on suspicion of conspiring to intercept communications.
- 30 October 2013: The trial of R v Coulson, Brooks and others begins at the Old Bailey. Previously Glenn Mulcaire, Neville Thurlbeck, James Weatherup and Greg Miskiw each plead guilty to various charges.
- 12 December 2013: The trial judge accepts that Ian Edmondson is unfit to continue and will be tried separately later.
- 24 June 2014: The trial jury finds Andy Coulson guilty of one charge of conspiracy to hack phones and fails to agree a verdict on two other charges. Brooks and the five remaining defendants are found not guilty.
- 4 July 2014: Sentences are delivered with Andy Coulson receiving 18 months imprisonment, former chief reporter Neville Thurlbeck and news editor Greg Miskiw sentences of six months each, former reporter James Weatherup a four-month suspended sentence, and former private investigator Glenn Mulcaire a six-month suspended sentence. Weatherup and Mulcaire also receive 200 hours of community service.
- 30 July 2014: The Crown Prosecution Service announce that News of the World former deputy editor Neil Wallis and features editor Jules Stenson plus Andy Coulson, Glenn Mulcaire, and five journalists are to be charged with illegally intercepting voicemail messages between 2003 and 2007.
- 5 August 2014: Andy Coulson is charged with three counts of perjury in relation to the evidence he gave at the trial of Tommy and Gail Sheridan in December 2010.

== See also ==
- Amdocs software
- iPAQ, a forerunner to the "smartphone"
- CTB v News Group Newspapers Ltd
- List of documents relating to the News International phone hacking scandal
- Metropolitan Police role in the news media phone hacking scandal
- Mosley v News Group Newspapers Ltd
- Overview of news media phone hacking scandals
- Operation Rubicon
- Phreaking
- Sheridan v News Group Newspapers Ltd
