= James Weatherup =

English newspaper journalist (b.1961)

- Born: 1961 (age 63–64); England
- Education: Coventry University
- Occupation(s): Journalist, news reporter, newspaper editor
- Notable credit(s): The People Sunday Mirror and the News of the World
- Children: 3

James Weatherup (born 1961) is an English newspaper journalist, news reporter, newspaper editor and PR Director.

After starting out in regional newspapers, he joined the News of the World, serving in two stints over 25 years for nine editors. In his first stint he rose to Chief reporter. During this time he co-wrote the best selling book Inside 25 Cromwell Street about the serial killers Fred and Rosemary West.

He then left for the Sunday People in 1999, where he was promoted to deputy news editor and then news editor a year later by editor Neil Wallis. He was then head hunted by the Sunday Mirror, where he joined as executive writer, splitting his time on the news desk and on the road for big assignments under the editorship of Tina Weaver. In 2004 News of the World editor Andy Coulson persuaded him to return and run the paper's news desk as news editor. Two years later he returned to a senior reporting role but retained the title of assistant news editor. In September 2010, Weatherup broke the front-page story about former world champion boxer Ricky Hatton snorting lines of cocaine after a year-long investigation.

Weatherup has three children and is a keen tennis player who has represented his county of Essex at over 45 and over 50's level. A former LTA tennis coach, he plays regularly in Essex County Div 1 vets leagues. He has won the Essex County winter mixed over 45's title twice with Louise Baker and the men's over 55's doubles title with Wayne Lemoine and is the current over 55's singles champion. A keen golfer, he also helped edit and write The History of Romford Golf Club.

He was arrested by the Metropolitan Police on 14 April 2011 as part of Operation Weeting, the force's investigation of the News of the World phone hacking affair. He was initially bailed until September 2011. This was later extended until March 2012.

He received a suspended sentence and a 200-hour community service order after he pleaded guilty at R v Coulson, Brooks and others. The judge described him as 'a distinguished journalist'. Since leaving the News of the World he started a new career in PR. In 2015 he was appointed chief reporter for the Central European News Agency and sports editor of the London and Surrey Times newspapers. He is now an account director at Keith Bishop Associates in London's West End.

== See also ==
- News International phone hacking scandal
- Phone hacking scandal reference lists
- Metropolitan police role in phone hacking scandal
