= Tom Crone =

Tom Crone may refer to:

- Tom Crone (politician), Green Party leader on Liverpool City Council
- Tom Crone (barrister), associated with the News International phone hacking scandal
