= R v Coulson, Brooks and others =

British court case decided in 2014

R v Brooks, Coulson and six others
- Court: Central Criminal Court (Old Bailey)

Court membership
- Judge sitting: Mr. Justice Saunders

R v Coulson, Brooks and others was a trial at the Old Bailey in London, England, arising from the News International phone hacking scandal.

== Pleas ==
At the start, Glenn Mulcaire, Neville Thurlbeck, James Weatherup and Greg Miskiw all pleaded guilty to various charges.

The accused who pleaded not guilty and went to trial were Rebekah Brooks, Andy Coulson, Charlie Brooks, Clive Goodman, Ian Edmondson, Stuart Kuttner, Cheryl Carter and Mark Hanna.

== Trial ==
The trial began on 28 October 2013.

At the start of the trial, the court was told by counsel for the crown, Andrew Edis QC, that Rebekah Brooks and Andy Coulson had an affair over a period lasting at least six years from 1998 to 2004, the period when much of the alleged conspiracy is claimed to have taken place.

On 12 December 2013, the judge announced that Ian Edmondson was ill and unlikely to recover for several weeks, so the trial would proceed without dealing with the charges against him; they would be dealt with at a later trial.

On 24 June 2014 the jury found Coulson guilty of one charge of conspiracy to hack phones; it failed to agree a verdict on two other charges of conspiring to cause misconduct in public office in relation to the alleged purchase of confidential royal phone directories in 2005 from a palace police officer. Brooks and five other defendants were found not guilty of conspiracy to pervert the course of justice. Prime Minister David Cameron was criticised in court by the trial judge for public remarks he made in response to the guilty verdict while the jury was still considering the outstanding charges against Coulson and Goodman.

On 30 June 2014 the trial judge, Mr Justice Saunders, announced that Coulson and the News of the World's former royal editor, Clive Goodman, would face a retrial on the outstanding charges.

On 4 July 2014, Coulson was one of four ex-journalists at the News of the World to be sentenced, along with private investigator Glenn Mulcaire. The sentences were:

- Coulson – 18 months
- Former chief reporter Neville Thurlbeck and news editor Greg Miskiw – six months each
- Former reporter James Weatherup – four months suspended
- Former private investigator Glenn Mulcaire – six monthe suspended
- Weatherup and Mulcaire – 200 hours community service

A court hearing in July 2014 established that Ian Edmondson was fit to continue. On 3 October 2014, Edmondson changed his plea to guilty, becoming the eighth person to be convicted of phone hacking at the now-defunct News of the World. He admitted conspiring with colleagues and private detective Glenn Mulcaire to intercept private voicemails between 3 October 2000 and 9 August 2006. These included the voicemails of two home secretaries, also, Sir Paul McCartney and the actors Jude Law and Sienna Miller. The court heard that Edmondson tasked Mulcaire with hacking some 344 times.

== Sentencing ==
On 7 November 2014, Mr Justice Saunders jailed Edmondson for eight months, saying that he only had himself to blame.
