= Ian Edmondson =

British journalist and newspaper editor

- Born: c. 1969; UK
- Occupation(s): Journalist, newspaper editor
- Notable credit(s): News of the World, The People

Ian Edmondson (born c. 1969) is a British tabloid journalist. He was the news editor at the News of the World. Edmondson was arrested by the Metropolitan Police in April 2011 during the Operation Weeting phone-hacking investigation.

== Career ==
Edmondson worked for News of the World twice. Before landing his first position at News of the World Edmondson worked as a freelance reporter. He was initially hired by News of the World as a general news reporter. He went on to spend 18 months as the paper's crime correspondent before moving to rival tabloid The People in 2000 as assistant news editor. He progressed through deputy news editor and news editor and was promoted to assistant editor (news) in 2003. Edmondson was hired to the News of the World editorial team by Neil Wallis, who was Andy Coulson's deputy editor in November 2004. Coulson promoted Edmondson to assistant editor of the news department in October 2005.

A former News of the World reporter said that Edmondson was one of the inner circle of executives when Coulson was editor of the paper. As the assistant editor of the news section, he was part of a clique of senior-ranking staff that discussed 'high grade' and sensitive news stories privately after the official editorial meetings had taken place. He was reported to have been privy to most of the big scoops the paper published each week. News of the World's former royal editor, Clive Goodman, who produced some news scoops which involved paying the private detective Glenn Mulcaire to hack into mobile phones belonging to leading public figures, was a colleague of Edmondson's.

In May 2012 Edmondson was appointed as the editor of Loaded magazine.

== News of the World phone hacking scandal ==
Edmondson was suspended on 5 January 2011 after being implicated in the News of the World phone hacking scandal, and sacked later in the same month. Edmondson was arrested, along with his former colleague Neville Thurlbeck on 5 April 2011 by police as part of Operation Weeting, and released on bail until September 2011, later extended until March 2012.

He was one of those on trial in R v Brooks, Coulson and six others, but when he fell ill the trial continued without him. A court hearing in July 2014 established that Edmondson was fit to continue. On 3 October 2014, Edmondson changed his plea to guilty, becoming the eighth person from the now-defunct News of the World to be convicted of phone hacking. Edmondson admitted conspiring with colleagues and private detective Glenn Mulcaire to intercept private voicemails between 3 October 2000 and 9 August 2006. These included the voicemails of two home secretaries, Sir Paul McCartney and the actors Jude Law and Sienna Miller. The court heard that Edmondson tasked Mulcaire with hacking some 344 times. On 7 November 2014, Mr Justice Saunders jailed Edmondson for eight months, saying that he only had himself to blame.

== See also ==
- Phone hacking scandal reference lists
- Metropolitan police role in phone hacking scandal
