= Greg Miskiw =

British journalist and news editor (1949–2021)

- Born: Ihor Miskiw; December 1949; Halifax, West Yorkshire, England
- Died: 25 September 2021 (aged 71)
- Citizenship: United Kingdom
- Occupation: Editor
- Criminal charges: Arrested by the Polish authorities for visa irregularities in 1981; arrested on 10 August 2011 as part of Operation Weeting on suspicion of unlawful interception of communications; charged with conspiracy to intercept communications without lawful authority on 24 July 2012

Greg Miskiw (born Ihor Miskiw; December 1949 – 25 September 2021) was a British journalist and news editor of the defunct tabloid newspaper the News of the World.

== Career ==
Miskiw was born in Leeds, Yorkshire in December 1949 and was of Ukrainian descent. He began a career in journalism after taking the National Council for the Training of Journalists' one-year full-time entry course at Highbury Technical College, Portsmouth, in 1968–69.

=== Mirror Group ===
During the 1980s, Miskiw worked as a reporter for tabloid papers published by the Mirror Group. He was arrested by the Polish authorities for visa irregularities in 1981 while working for the Sunday Mirror. He later moved to work for the Daily Mirror.

=== News of the World ===
By 2001 Miskiw was working for the News of the World as assistant editor on the news desk. There he helped to co-ordinate the work of Mazher Mahmood (also known as the fake sheikh), particularly Mahmood's taping of frank unguarded comments by Sophie, Countess of Wessex about various political figures and members of the Royal Family. He became assistant editor (news and investigations) in 2001. In April 2002 News of the World's crime editor Peter Rose resigned following the collapse of a proposed interview with a witness to the death of Damilola Taylor. In 2003 an employment tribunal ruled in favour of Rose's case for constructive dismissal. The tribunal chairman was particularly critical of Greg Miskiw, who failed to inform the reporters that the funding which would have enabled the interview to occur was not in place until all of the parties were ready to begin. The chairman said the Miskiw's manner was "cavalier and irresponsible" adding that Miskiw's actions "could no doubt affect the reputation of the applicant". Later that year Miskiw moved to Manchester to oversee News of the World's north of England office.

Speaking of the activities of the News of the World, Miskiw once said "That is what we do - we go out and destroy other people's lives".

=== Post-News of the World ===
Miskiw left the News of the World in 2005. He acted as editor of the Mercury Press Agency and planned to buy shares in the company, but was dismissed after 5 months. He subsequently moved to Delray Beach, Florida working for the tabloid newspaper the Globe for two months in early 2011. In June of that year he started a company named "News Inc LLC". In July following conversations between his solicitor and British police he returned to the UK.

Miskiw was arrested on 10 August 2011 as part of Operation Weeting on suspicion of unlawful interception of communications. He was released on police bail the following day. On 24 July 2012, he was charged with conspiracy to intercept communications without lawful authority during the period from 3 October 2000 to 9 August 2006 from the phones of Milly Dowler, Sven-Göran Eriksson, Abigail Titmuss, John Leslie Andrew Gilchrist, David Blunkett MP, Delia Smith, Charles Clarke MP, Jude Law, Sadie Frost, Sienna Miller, and Wayne Rooney .

== Personal life ==
Miskiw was of Ukrainian descent. His first name is actually Ihor. His former girlfriend, Terenia Taras, a freelance journalist who wrote stories for the News of the World, has also been arrested as part of Operation Weeting. Miskiw lived in the coastal town of Delray Beach, Florida in the United States, and had two children. Miskiw was also a passionate supporter of Leeds United.

He pleaded guilty at R v Coulson, Brooks and others and was sentenced to six months in prison.

Miskiw suffered a pulmonary embolism in April 2021, and was diagnosed with lung cancer in August. He died on 25 September 2021, at the age of 71. He was survived by his mother and his two children.

== See also ==
- News media phone hacking scandal
- News International phone hacking scandal
- Phone hacking scandal reference lists
- Metropolitan police role in phone hacking scandal
