= Neville Thurlbeck =

British journalist (born 1961)

Neville Thurlbeck (born 7 October 1961) is a British journalist who worked for the tabloid newspaper News of the World for 21 years. He reached the position of news editor before returning to the position of chief reporter. Thurlbeck was among four ex-News of the World journalists to plead guilty to phone-hacking and was sentenced to jail, along with the Prime Minister David Cameron's former director of communications Andy Coulson, his editor at the News of the World. He served 37 days in jail. Before the News of the World, Thurlbeck worked as a reporter for the Today newspaper, as deputy news editor of the Western Mail and as chief reporter for the Harrow Observer.

From 2011, Thurlbeck worked in the corporate communications sector. In 2016, he was appointed director of communications for the International Fur Federation, with responsibility for global communications in a sector worth $30 billion per year.

He also ran his own PR company Clear Vista Media.

== Education ==
Thurlbeck was educated at Bede School in Sunderland, followed by the University of Lancaster. Thurlbeck spent 1984-85 in Sudan teaching English language and literature to sixth formers at a boys' boarding school.

== Career ==
In 1998 Thurlbeck was the newspaper journalist who 'outed' the Cabinet Minister Nick Brown as gay. Thurlbeck also broke the story that Jeffrey Archer had committed perjury during his 1987 libel case against the Daily Star. The scoop won Thurlbeck three industry awards including Scoop of the Year 1999 from the London Press Club.

At the turn of the millennium Thurlbeck, under the codename "George", acted as an "unpaid source" for the police. In return he received information from the Police National Computer which principally consisted of the previous convictions of various criminals. In 2000 Thurlbeck and the police officer with whom he worked were cleared of corruption charges with regard to their working relationship.

In 2001 Thurlbeck moved from his position as investigations news editor to become news editor. He held the position for approximately two years before stepping down in 2003 to become chief reporter.

In 2004 Thurlbeck broke a story which alleged footballer David Beckham was having an affair. This won him his second Scoop of the Year award at the British Press Awards, a record which remains unbeaten. He was responsible for the exclusive over Max Mosley's private life which resulted in his newspaper being sued, paying £60,000 damages for the paper's breach of his privacy. Mosley later suggested that Thurlbeck's methods were akin to blackmail, with the journalist telling women that "if you don't co-operate we will publish your pictures unpixellated."

Thurlbeck was dismissed from News International in September 2011 in the wake of the News International phone hacking scandal. Thurlbeck said he did not receive the reason for his dismissal from his former employer but from the Metropolitan police. He denied the allegations which led to his sacking and pursued a claim of unfair dismissal against News International. Thurlbeck had worked for News of the World for 21 years at the time of his dismissal.

In July, 2017, it was revealed that Thurlbeck had won his case for unfair dismissal and had settled his claim amicably. His lawyer announced: "Neville Thurlbeck reached an agreement with News Group Newspapers Ltd to settle his Employment Tribunal claim amicably. This ended a very difficult and complex four years. He wishes News UK and all his former colleagues good fortune and a bright future. He will be issuing no further comment on this matter."

It was announced on 17 February 2012 that Thurlbeck had become a theatre critic for the Surrey Comet newspaper.

On 12 April 2013 Thurlbeck launched TalentGB, which specialised in hosting the showreels of artistes of every genre. The company also acted as a PR adviser to several bands and singers. The company website was talentgb.com. Thurlbeck's role can be viewed at http://www.talentgb.com/content/team-talentgb

In December 2014 Thurlbeck was made a director of The Retail Ombudsman. This decision was criticised in the Ombudsman Omnishambles report.

In 2014, he became Managing Director of PR company Clear Vista Media.

In 2016, he was appointed a director of the International Fur Federation, with responsibility for global communications for 39 member countries.

Thurlbeck's memoir, Tabloid Secrets: The Stories Behind the Headlines at the World's Most Famous Newspaper was published in May 2015.

He announced his retirement from PR and journalism on social media in 2020.

== Awards ==
2005

British Press Awards. Scoop of the Year. Winner.

British Press Awards. Reporter of the Year. Runner-up.

London Press Club Awards. Scoop of the Year. Runner-up.

2004

Campaign Magazine Scoop of the Year. Winner.

2000

British Press Awards. Scoop of the Year. Winner.

What the Papers Say Awards. Scoop of the Year. Winner.

London Press Club Awards. Scoop of the Year. Winner.

Campaign Magazine Scoop of the Year Award. Winner.

1999

British Press Awards. Specialist Reporter of the Year. Runner-up.

1998

British Press Awards. Scoop of the Year. Runner-up.

== News International phone hacking scandal ==
In 2009 Thurlbeck was reported as one of the journalists who had received transcripts of intercepted calls in the News International phone hacking scandal. He was arrested by officers from Operation Weeting on 5 April 2011 after voluntarily attending a police interview. He was bailed initially until September 2011 but bail was later extended until March 2012.

It was announced by the Crown Prosecution Service in April 2012 that Thurlbeck would not be prosecuted over claims of witness intimidation. Thurlbeck was arrested in March 2012 by officers from Operation Weeting, on suspicion of intimidating a witness and encouraging or assisting an offence after he published the home address of an executive on News Corporation's management and standards committee on his website on 7 March. On 24 July, it was announced that Thurlbeck would be charged with conspiring to intercept communications and the unlawful interception of voicemail messages.

His name appears in an e-mail from a News of the World reporter headed "for Neville" which contained transcripts of 35 voicemails.

He was sentenced to 6 months in prison after he pleaded guilty at R v Coulson, Brooks and others.

He was released after serving 37 days, sharing the same cell as Andy Coulson. Upon his release, the Guardian newspaper reported Thurlbeck saying: "He refused to comment any further on Coulson save to say that after two weeks they were given permission to wear civilian clothes. Thurlbeck revealed that his former boss opted for his “splendid designer polo shirt and jeans while I remained in the prison uniform as I believe in dressing for the occasion.”

== See also ==
- News International phone hacking scandal
- Phone hacking scandal reference lists
- Metropolitan police role in phone hacking scandal
