= Tom Crone (barrister) =

British barrister

Tom Crone is a British barrister, last working for News International as Legal Affairs manager, before he resigned during the News International phone hacking scandal in 2011.

== Career ==
Crone qualified as a barrister, and after five years of private practise joined Mirror Group Newspapers. In 1985, he joined News International, appointed as Legal Affairs manager. During his time at the group, acting for The Sun and the News of the World, he won plaudits from both colleagues and rivals for his unerring journalistic instinct: "He is a unique lawyer in that he has great journalistic instincts. He is sort of 10% journalist and is incredibly streetwise." A close personal friend of the late George Carman QC, Crone was one of the first media managers to use libel defence specialist John Kelsey-Fry QC. He also hit out at then Attorney General for England and Wales Lord Goldsmith for clamping down on media coverage of high-profile cases, such as the allegations of rape made against a group of Premier League footballers, before they go to trial.

== Resignation ==
As part of his role at News International, Crone gave evidence before parliamentary committees in 2009, stating that he had uncovered no evidence of phone hacking beyond the criminal offences committed by the royal editor Clive Goodman. In 2011, within 10 days of the revelation of the hacking of Milly Dowler's phone, he resigned from his position at News International. He maintains that he did not see an internal report suggesting that phone hacking at the paper reached more widely than Goodman. Since police renewed investigations in 2011, 90 people have been arrested and 16 formally charged with crimes in conjunction with illegal acquisition of confidential information. Many of these people were employees or agents of News International during the period that Crone was the legal manager there.

On 30 August 2012, he was arrested on suspicion of conspiring to intercept communications and was taken to a local police station for questioning.

== See also ==
- News media phone hacking scandal
- News International phone hacking scandal
- Phone hacking scandal reference lists
- Metropolitan police role in phone hacking scandal
