= List of investigations, resignations, suspensions, and dismissals in conjunction with the news media phone hacking scandal =

This List of investigations, resignations, suspensions, and dismissals in conjunction with the news media phone hacking scandal is a chronological listing of investigations, actual and considered, into illegal acquisition of confidential information or cover-up by employees or other agents of news media companies in conjunction with the phone hacking scandal. Investigations listed here concern interception of voicemail, hacking of computers, obtaining confidential information under false pretenses, and payments to officials. Dates in parentheses indicate approximately when each investigation was initiated or considered.

Prior to 2010 investigations focused on just a few individuals, even though there was evidence of many people being engaged in illegal activity. "The lead investigator in Operation Motorman, a 2006 inquiry...said that his team were told not to interview journalists involved. The investigator...accused authorities of being too 'frightened' to tackle journalists." In August 2006, the Metropolitan Police Service (Scotland Yard) seized from a private investigator (Glenn Mulcaire) “11,000 pages of handwritten notes listing nearly 4,000 celebrities, politicians, sports stars, police officials and crime victims whose phone may have been hacked by News of the World.” These documents remained largely unevaluated until the autumn of 2010, even though “senior Scotland Yard officials assured Parliament, judges, lawyers, potential hacking victims, the news media and the public that there was no evidence of widespread hacking by the tabloid.” Testimony indicated that “the police agency and News International … became so intertwined that they wound up sharing the goal of containing the investigation. Through March 2011, no News of the World executives or reporters other than Goodman were questioned.

By September 2012, The Metropolitan Police had a total of 185 officers investigating illegal acquisition of confidential information at a cost estimated at £9 million for 2012 and £40 million forecast over four years. This included 96 officers investigating under Operation Weeting, 70 under Operation Elveden and 19 under Operation Tuleta.

== By law enforcement organizations ==

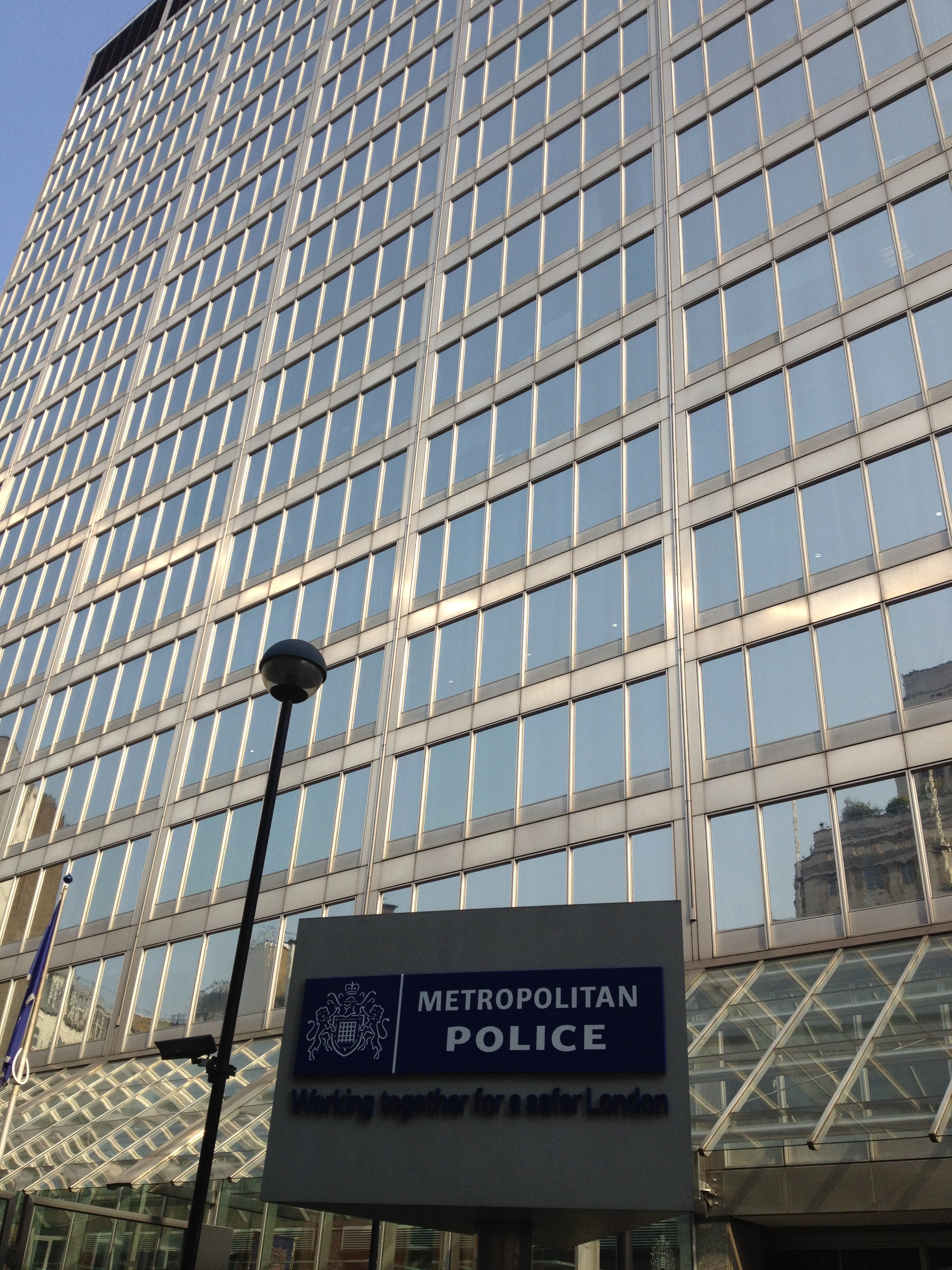
Investigations by the Metropolitan Police (Scotland Yard) in 2002 and 2006 were limited to just a few individuals, even though there was evidence of widespread phone hacking.

Investigations were opened in the US in 2011 as concerns grew that News Corporation subsidiaries there also used illegal methods to acquire confidential information.

Organization	Name	Date(s)	Notes	Ref(s)
(United Kingdom) Metropolitan Police	Operation Nigeria	May 1999-September 1999	Surveillance of Southern Investigations run by the anti-corruption squad CIB3.	
(United Kingdom) Metropolitan Police	Operation Glade	2003	Followed up on evidence obtained in Operation Motorman.	
(United States) FBI		2004	Computer hacking	
(United Kingdom) Metropolitan Police		2006	Investigation headed by Andy Hayman and limited to Clive Goodman and Glenn Mulcaire.	
(United Kingdom) Metropolitan Police		2009	Decision made by John Yates not to reopen/broaden the 2006 investigation.	
(United States) FBI		2010	Probe into a group of hackers who reportedly stole compromising pictures and video from the computers and mobile devices of up to 50 celebrities.	
(United Kingdom) Metropolitan Police	Operation Weeting	26 January 2011	Interception of voicemail. Run by Sue Akers, a Deputy Assistant Commissioner with the Metropolitan Police. Akers's investigation team consists of 45 officers.	
(United Kingdom) Metropolitan Police	Operation Tuleta	10 June 2011	Computer hacking and breaches of privacy not covered by the two parallel Met investigations into phone hacking (Weeting), and into corruption of public officials (Elveden). Tuleta handled acquisition of confidential information from stolen mobile phones.	
(United Kingdom) Metropolitan Police	Operation Elveden	6 July 2011	Investigation into bribery, corruption supervised by the Independent Police Complaints Commission. Initial focus was on News of the World personnel but expanded in 2012 to cover potentially inappropriate payments by journalists at Trinity Mirror, the publisher of the Daily Mirror, Sunday Mirror and The People, and Northern & Shell, publisher of the Daily Express, Sunday Express, Daily Star and Daily Star Sunday.	
(United Kingdom) Metropolitan Police		July 2011	Inquiry initiated by former commissioner Sir Paul Stephenson "to examine the ethical considerations that should underpin relations between the Metropolitan police and the media." Led by Elizabeth Filkin, the former Parliamentary Commissioner for Standards, and "aims to draw up a framework for how officers operate in their contact with journalists."	
(United Kingdom) Strathclyde Police	Operation Rubicon	22 July 2011	Perjury, phone hacking, and breaches of data protection in Scotland. Fifty Strathclyde Police officers assigned. Led by Detective Superintendent John McSporran.	
(United States) FBI		14 July 2011	Investigation into interception of voicemail.	
(United States) Department of Justice		July 2011	"Considering need" regarding bribery of foreign officials.	
(Australia) Australian Federal Police		July 2011	"Evaluating referrals".	
(United States) FBI		August 2011	Investigation into computer hacking.	
(United Kingdom) Durham Police		Summer 2011	"Outside police force to conduct a review of Operation Weeting...Jon Stoddart, chief constable of Durham constabulary, has agreed to undertake the review. The review team will be taken from a number of forces outside the MPS" (Metropolitan Police Service).	
(United Kingdom) Metropolitan Police Directorate of Professional Standards (DPS)		16 September 2011	DPS, responsible for investigating complaints against the professional conduct of Met officers, initiated an investigation of possible leaks by Met officers to The Guardian that led to the public disclosure that Milly Dowler's voicemail had been illegally intercepted. In its application for production orders, DPS cited the Official Secrets Act, an unusual use of this Act that has severe penalties, as well as the Police and Criminal Evidence Act (PACE) in its order to require reporter Nick Davies and others to disclose sources. It was the Milly Dowler disclosure that inflamed public opinion against phone hacking and led to the resignations of top Met officials, commissioner Sir Paul Stephenson and assistant commissioner John Yates. Four days later, in the face of strong negative reaction from politicians, lawyers, and the press, the Met decided not to pursue the application for production orders.	
(United Kingdom) Metropolitan Police	Operation Kalmyk	By February 2012	Illegal access to computers; acknowledged by Sue Akers, a Deputy Assistant Commissioner with the Metropolitan Police. May include investigation of Philip Campbell Smith who may have hacked a former British army intelligence officer's computer in 2006 on behalf of News of the World.	
(United Kingdom) Independent Police Complaints Commission		28 June 2011	Inquiry as to whether two senior Surrey police officers became aware as early as 2002 that Milly Dowler's mobile phone had been hacked and did not act on this information. Deputy Chief Constable Craig Denholm was second most senior officer at Surrey police and in overall charge of the Dowler disappearance/murder investigation named "Operation Ruby". He later worked for Metropolitan police assistant commissioner John Yates up until shortly before Yates made his cursory 2009 review and determined there was no basis for further investigation into phone hacking. Detective Superintendent Maria Woodall was the detective chief inspector in operational charge of the Dowler investigation from 2006 onwards.	
(United Kingdom) Metropolitan Police	Operation Sacha	By April 2012	Related to the arrest of Rebekah Brooks, her husband Charlie and others for alleged conspiracy to pervert the course of justice.	
(United Kingdom) Metropolitan Police	Operation Kilo	By April 2012	Related to leaks from phone-hacking investigation Operation Weeting.	

== By national government bodies ==
Organization	Date(s)	Notes	Ref(s)
(United Kingdom) Information Commissioner's Office	November 2002	Operation Motorman	
(United Kingdom) Culture, Media and Sport Committee	2009	Inquiry; phone hacking.	
(United Kingdom) Independent Police Complaints Commission	2009	Inquiry regarding John Yates's handling of the phone-hacking review in 2009.	
(United Kingdom) Culture, Media and Sport Committee	September 2010	Inquiry; phone hacking.	
(United Kingdom) Home Affairs Select Committee	1 September 2010	Inquiry; phone hacking.	
(United Kingdom) Culture, Media and Sport Committee	2011	Inquiry; "currently restricted to looking at whether it was "previously misled in the evidence we were given in relation to the News of the World."	
(United Kingdom) Independent Police Complaints Commission	July 2011	Inquiry into "whether John Yates used his position to help get Neil Wallis's daughter a job at Scotland Yard.	
(United Kingdom) Information Commissioner's Office	July 2011	Investigation looking into use of private investigators by Ministers of Parliament.	
(United Kingdom) UK Public inquiry	July 2011	Chaired by Lord Justice Leveson. Looking into "the extent of unlawful or improper conduct within News International and other newspaper organisations, the way the police first investigated the phone-hacking scandal and whether police officers received corrupt payments."	
(United States) US Congress	July 2011	Inquiry called for; Citizens for Responsibility and Ethics in Washington (CREW) sent a letter "to the heads of four congressional committees appealing for the legislature to investigate whether Murdoch's papers in the UK or the US were involved in illegal actions against American citizens."	
(Australia) Australian Parliament	July 2011	Inquiry called for; "The Greens...have called for a parliamentary inquiry into News Limited, Mr Murdoch's Australian firm."	
(United Kingdom) Electoral Commission	August 2011	Inquiry called for; by "Labour MP Tom Watson regarding Andy Coulson's receiving "several hundred thousand pounds from his former employer News International after he was hired by the Conservative party." The Electoral Commission declined to investigate because there was "no evidence that Conservative party breached electoral law by failing to declare payments."	
(United Kingdom) Public Administration Select Committee	26 August 2011	Inquiry; to "consider the vetting procedures for new special advisers and how to avoid conflicts of interests after... revelations that [Andy] Coulson, a former editor of News of the World, was paid by News International while employed by the Conservative party.	
(United Kingdom) Her Majesty's Inspectorate of Constabulary	1 September 2011	Inquiry to address "alleged corruption and abuse of power" in police relationships with the media"...ordered by Home Secretary Theresa May and "led by a former chief constable of Essex, Roger Baker. His remit will range from payments made to custody sergeants for tip-offs about arrests, to buying drinks and providing lavish hospitality for officers."	
(Australia) Australian Parliamentary	14 September 2011	Announced inquiry into media regulation to be "headed by former judge Ray Finkelstein.... The inquiry will shed light on the real pressures facing media organisations today and enable us to consider what regulatory or legislative changes might be needed in order to ensure that Australia continues to benefit from strong independent and diverse media... Due to report back by 28 February 2012. Mr Finkelstein will be assisted by journalism academic Matthew Ricketson."	
(United Kingdom) Office of Communications (Ofcom)	23 April 2012	Inquiry; announced it is investigating Sky News to see if it broke broadcasting rules by hacking emails to get a story and whether there is a "public interest" justification.	

== By private organizations ==
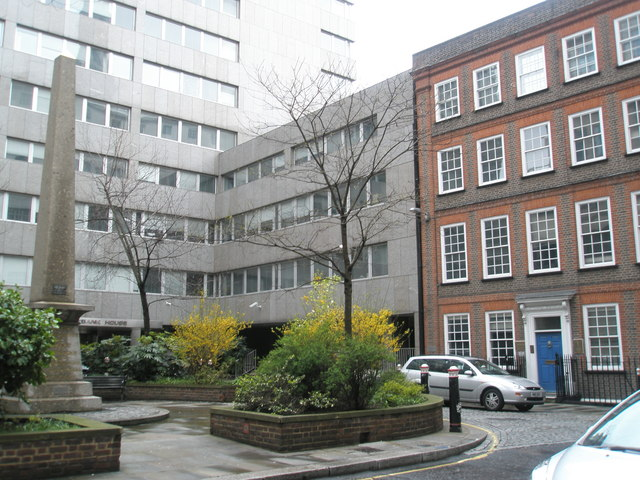
The Press Complaints Commission, located in Salisbury Square, London, conducted investigations into phone hacking in 2007 and 2009 and concluded there was no widespread abuse. The Commission "withdrew" this conclusion in 2011.

Organization	Date(s)	Notes	Ref(s)
(United Kingdom) Press Complaints Commission (PCC)	2007	Inquiry; report concludes phone message tapping should stop but that "there is a legitimate place for the use of subterfuge when there are grounds in the public interest to use it and it is not possible to obtain information through other means." News of the World editor Colin Myler told the PCC that Goodman's hacking was "aberrational", "a rogue exception," done by a single journalist. Sir Christopher Meyer, then chairman of the PCC, "promised to investigate 'the entire newspaper and magazine industry of the UK to establish what is their practice' but opted not to question Andy Coulson on the grounds that he had resigned, and not to question any other journalist or editorial executive on the paper, apart from Myler, who necessarily had no direct knowledge of what had been going on before his arrival. The PCC's subsequent report failed to uncover any evidence of any phone hacking by any media organisation beyond that revealed at Goodman's trial." The Daily Mail alone made 985 requests, more than any other paper. After the conviction of Whittamore, the Information Commission, which is responsible for policing confidential databases, urged the Press Complaints Commission to issue "a clear public statement warning journalists and editors of the very real risks of committing criminal offences." Documents released under the Freedom of Information Act show that the PCC, which is funded by newspapers, resisted doing this and finally produced guidance which the Information Commission has publicly described as "disappointing".	
(United Kingdom) Press Complaints Commission (PCC)	2009	Inquiry; "Concerned with whether it was misled by the News of the World during its 2007 investigation, and whether there is any evidence that phone message hacking has taken place since 2007." Its report concluded the PCC was not misled and that there is no evidence of ongoing phone hacking. This report and its conclusions were withdrawn on 6 July 2011.	
(United Kingdom) Solicitors Regulation Authority	22 July 2011	Inquiry	

== By news media companies ==
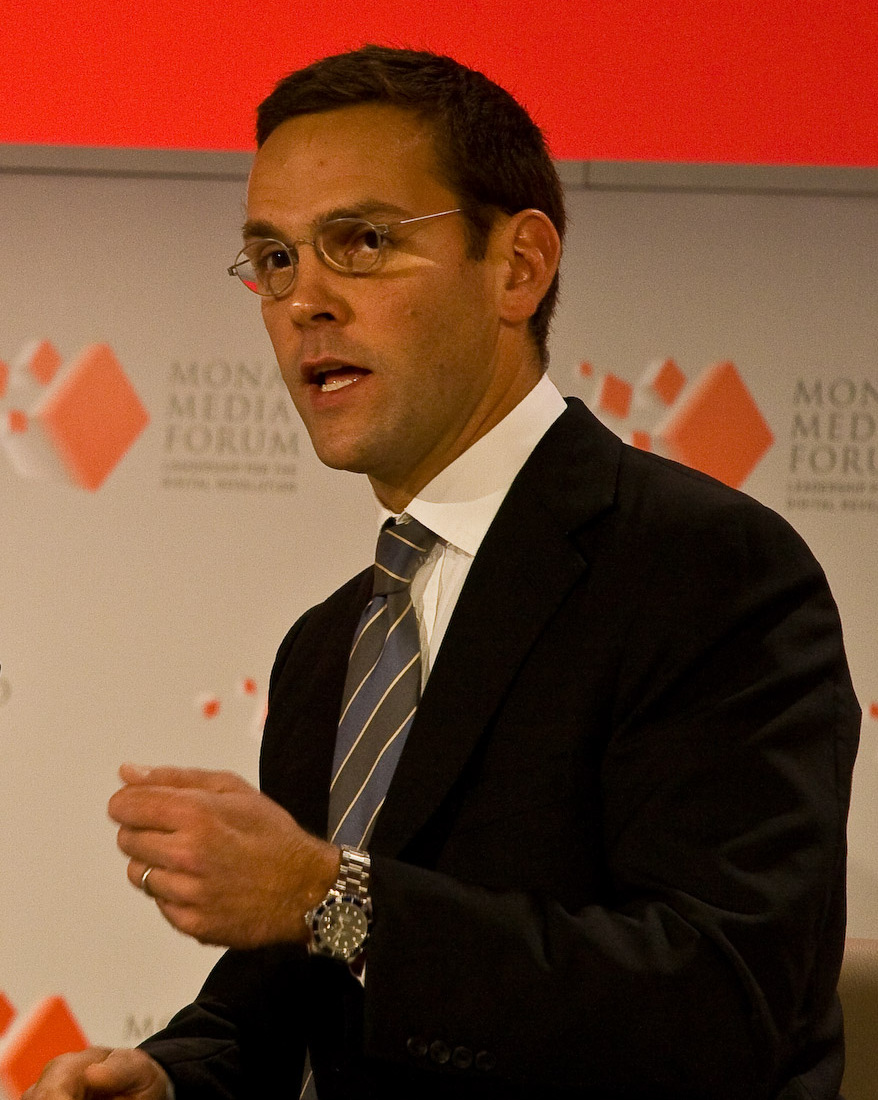
James Murdoch, Chief Executive Officer for News Corp, Europe and Asia maintained through 2009 that phone hacking within News International was limited to a single "rogue reporter" and his private investigator. This claim was challenged by Murdoch's senior executives.

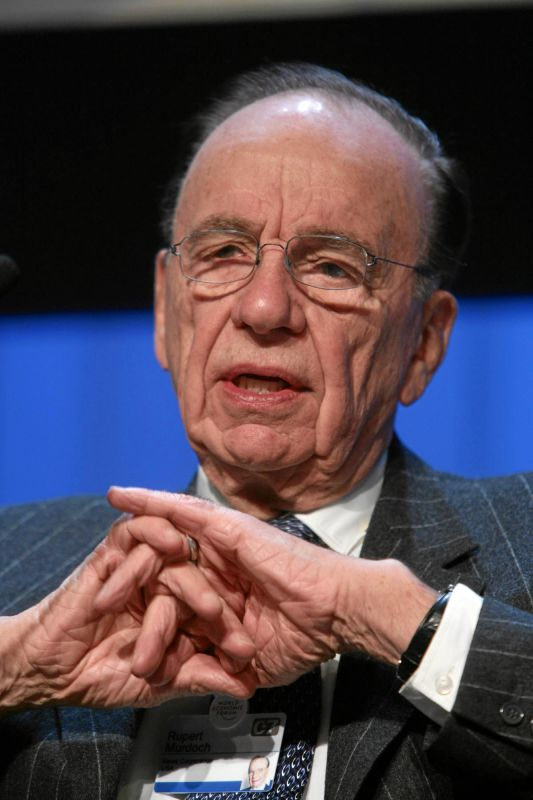
Several internal investigations over five years by News International did not uncover widespread phone hacking. After the scandal broke in 2011, Rupert Murdoch's, Board of Directors for News Corporation undertook another investigation.

Organization	Date(s)	Notes	Ref(s)
News International/Burton Copeland Investigation	8 August 2005	On the day the Met seized documents from Goodman and Mulcaire and arrested both of them for conspiracy to intercept communications without lawful authority, News of the World editors said they were stunned and vowed to conduct an internal investigation. On 6 March 2007, Les Hinton advised the Commons Culture, Media, and Sport Committee that "a full, rigorous internal inquiry" is ongoing." Asked whether Goodman was the only person who knew about the phone hacking, Hinton replied that he believed Goodman was. In 2009, Colin Myler testified at the Commons Culture, Media and Sport Committee hearing that the firm of Burton Copeland was engaged "to absolutely oversee the investigation to cooperate with police...a very thorough investigation took place where there was a thorough review of everything from how cash payments were processed." Tom Crone testified that "Burton Copeland were in the office virtually every day...their remit was that they were brought in to go over everything and find out what had gone wrong, to liaise with the police...They were given absolutely free-range to ask whatever they wanted to ask." Andy Coulson testified that "I brought in Burton Copeland... to do an investigation. We opened up the files as much as we could. There was nothing they asked for that they were not given." As of August 2011, News International had not waived privilege with respect to Burton Copeland and their investigation. Linklaters replaced Burton Copeland in representing News International in July 2011. Linklaters sent a letter to the Commons Culture, Media and Sport Committee in August 2011 stating "Burton Copeland did not conduct an investigation into phone hacking at the News of the World and their role was 'only about helping the police'... [but] Scotland Yard received 'very little material' from News International and Burton Copeland."	
News International		Email Review by Jonathan Chapman and Daniel Cloke; reviewed a limited number of emails which were made available to them" through an electronic folder of emails assembled by News International's IT department." and which were subsequently made available to Harbottle & Lewis for review. Chapman states they were not "tasked with looking for evidence of any other potentially illegal activities" but had they come across evidence "of either voicemail interception or any other criminal activity," they would have reported it to their employer.	
News International	March 2007	Email Review by Harbottle & Lewis; Limited by News International to Clive Goodman's claim of unfair dismissal, limited to emails made available to Harbottle & Lewis by News International, and limited to determining whether others at News International were aware of Clive Goodman's illegal activity or were engaged in similar activity. This inquiry specifically did not include "(i)... email traffic between Mr. Goodman and several other key senior reporters and editorial executives, current and former, at the News of the World... (ii) ...emails from and to Mr. Mulcaire and (iii)...staff interviews and a review of cash payments."	
News Corp	18 July 2011	Investigation; Management and Standards Committee (MSC) Chairman Lord Anthony Grabiner will report to Joel Klein, Executive Vice President and News Corp Board director, who in turn will report to Viet Dinh, a Director and Chairman of News Corp’s Nominating and Corporate Governance Committee.	
Australia's News Limited	July 2011	"Launched a review of all payments made by the group in the last three years.	
Daily Mirror	26 July 2011	Investigation; "Six-week review...led by Trinity Mirror's group legal director Paul Vickers...to include all of the group's national and regional newspapers, including the Daily Mirror, Sunday Mirror, The People, and the Daily Record."	

== Resignations, suspensions, and dismissals ==
This is a chronological listing of resignations, suspensions, and dismissals made in conjunction with the phone hacking scandal. The list does not include approximately 200 staff members who lost their positions when News of the World discontinued operations on 10 July 2011. Dates indicate when the resignation, suspension, or dismissal occurred.

Person	Date(s)	Type	Company	Notes	Ref(s)
Goodman, Clive	2 February 2007	Dismissed	News of the World		
Kuttner, Stuart	3 July 2009	Resigned	News of the World		
Evans, Dan	April 2010	Suspended (reporter)	News of the World		
Edmundson, Ian	January 2011	Suspended	News of the World		
Coulson, Andy	21 January 2011	Resigned	Chief Press Secretary to David Cameron		
Jacobs, Lawrence	8 June 2011	Resigned as general counsel	News Corporation		
Crone, Tom	13 July 2011	Left senior legal position	News International		
Brooks, Rebekah	15 July 2011	Resigned as CEO	News International		
Hinton, Les	15 July 2011	Resigned as CEO	Dow Jones & Company		
Stephenson, Paul	17 July 2011	Resigned as Commissioner	Metropolitan Police Service	Resigned "after it emerged that the Met had given a contract to Neil Wallis, the former deputy editor of the News of the World, who was later arrested on suspicion of phone hacking."	
Yates, John	18 July 2011	Resigned as Assistant Commissioner	Metropolitan Police Service		
Nixson, Matt	21 July 2011	Dismissed as reporter	The Sun	He was thought to have paid £750 to a prison guard for information about Ian Huntley while working for News of the World. He sued News International and their Management Standards Committee for wrongful dismissal but was reportedly in discussions about rejoining The Sun as of July 2012.	
Buscombe, Peta	29 July 2011	Resigned as chairman	Press Complaints Commission		
Dick Fedorcio	10 August 2011	Put on leave as director of public affairs and internal communication	Metropolitan Police	"Put on extended leave pending the result of an investigation by the Independent Police Complaints Commission (IPCC)...into Fedorcio's dealings with Neil Wallis, a former News of the World assistant editor who was arrested in July as part of Scotland Yard's investigation into phone hacking."	
Adam Smith	25 April 2012	Resigned as special adviser to Jeremy Hunt		Resigned after release of email correspondence between Smith and Frederic Michel, News Corp’s European head of affairs, containing confidential information suggesting that "an intense and cozy relationship" existed between the culture minister's office and one of James Murdoch’s close advisers during a highly sensitive bid process involving BSykB.	
