= Timeline of the News Corporation scandal =

The News Corporation scandal involves phone, voicemail, and computer hacking that were allegedly committed over a number of years. The scandal began in the United Kingdom, where the News International phone hacking scandal has to date resulted in the closure of the News of the World newspaper and the resignation of a number of senior members of the Metropolitan Police force.

== Pre-2010 ==
- 1 July 2000: Abduction and subsequent murder of eight-year-old Sarah Payne.
- 21 March 2002: Milly Dowler abducted.
- June 2002: News of the World hacks Dowler phone.
- November 2002: Police and ICO raid premises of private investigator John Boyall.
- 2003: Operation Motorman, the Information Commissioner's Office investigation.
- 2004: Floorgraphics reports hacking to FBI.
- February 2004: Boyall, Whittamore, King, and Marshall charged. Each ultimately pleaded guilty to Conspiring to Commit Misconduct While In Public Office.
- 7 July 2005: 7/7 London bombings
- 13 November 2005: Clive Goodman story in News of the World raises suspicions of voicemail hacking of the Royal Family.
- 10 May 2006: Information Commissioner report "What price privacy?" pdf
- 8 August 2006: Arrests of Clive Goodman (royal editor at the News of the World), Glenn Mulcaire (private investigator), Davy Craig (editor of the Weekly News).
- 13 December 2006: Information Commissioner report "What price privacy now?" pdf
- 26 January 2007: Goodman and Mulcaire sentenced. Andy Coulson's resignation from News of the World announced.
- July 2007: NewsIntl payment to Goodman.
- 9 July 2007: Coulson becomes adviser to Cameron.
- 12 May 2008: "For Neville" email details extent of hacking
- June 2008: Payment to Gordon Taylor
- July 2008: Andy Hayman begins job at The Times. Hayman led the earlier police investigation but had retired from the force earlier that year.
- 8 July 2009: The Guardian publicly reveals wider scope of phone hacking
- July 2009: Metropolitan Police (Stephenson, Yates) conduct review of 2006 investigation, find it to be satisfactory.
- 15–16 September 2009: Les Hinton and Assistant Police Commissioner Yates appear before Parliamentary committee.

== 2010 - 4 July 2011 ==
- February 2010: A Culture, Media and Sport select committee report finds no evidence that News of the World editor Andy Coulson knew of phone hacking taking place at his publication. It does however say it is "inconceivable" that no one apart from royal editor Clive Goodman was aware of it.
- 9 March 2010: The Guardian reports that publicist Max Clifford was paid £1 million to drop legal action that could have revealed more News of the World reporters hacked phones.
- 11 May 2010: Cameron becomes PM. Coulson becomes government Director of Communications.
- 1 September 2010: The New York Times quotes Sean Hoare, a former News of the World reporter, as claiming phone hacking was encouraged at the tabloid; he also tells the BBC that phone hacking was "endemic" at the paper and that Coulson asked him to do it. Paul McMullan, another former journalist at the News of the World, claims that other illegal reporting techniques were widespread.
- 5 January 2011: The News of the World suspends assistant news editor Ian Edmondson over hacking allegations. Private investigator Glenn Mulcaire claimed Edmonson commissioned him to hack phones.
- 23 January 2011: Start of Operation Weeting, an investigation by the Specialist Crime Directorate of the Metropolitan Police Service.
- April 2011: Edmondson, journalist James Weatherup and senior reporter Neville Thurlbeck are all arrested on suspicion of conspiring to intercept communications and unlawfully accessing voicemail messages.
- April 2011: June 2011 – Several claimants, including actress Sienna Miller and football pundit Andy Gray, receive damage awards from the News of the World.

== After 4 July 2011 ==
- 4 July 2011: The Guardian reports that the voicemail of murdered schoolgirl Milly Dowler was hacked by the News of the World. Rebekah Brooks was editor of the tabloid at the time but said it is "inconceivable" that she knew of the activity. Subsequent revelations include those suggesting relatives of British soldiers killed in action and victims and relatives of the 7/7 attack victims were also hacked.
- 6 July 2011: Prime Minister David Cameron announces government inquiry into the unfolding scandal.
- 7 July 2011: News International announce the closure of the News of the World, with the last edition to be published on 10 July.
- 8 July 2011: Andy Coulson is arrested over alleged phone hacking and making illegal payments to police. Clive Goodman is also arrested on suspicion of making illegal payments to police.
- 10 July 2011: News of the World publishes its last issue.
- 11 July 2011: The Guardian reports two other News Corporation outlets may have illegally accessed records of former Prime Minister Gordon Brown.
- 13 July 2011: BSkyB takeover withdrawn by News Corporation.
- 14 July 2011: Former News of the World executive editor Neil Wallis arrested.
- 15 July 2011: Rebekah Brooks, chief executive of News International, and Les Hinton, chief executive of Dow Jones & Company, both resign.
- 17 July 2011: Brooks arrested over corruption and phone hacking. Metropolitan Police commissioner Sir Paul Stephenson resigns.
- 18 July 2011: David Cameron postpones parliamentary recess by one day. John Yates resigns as assistant commissioner of the Metropolitan Police. Former News of the World reporter and the first to allege phone hacking at the publication, Sean Hoare, is found dead at his home in Hertfordshire. Theresa May tells the House of Commons she has launched an inquiry into malpractices and alleged corruption within the Police.
- 19 July 2011: Brooks, Rupert Murdoch and James Murdoch appeared before the parliamentary media committee in London for questioning.
- 20 July 2011: Parliament committee report released, Cameron appeared in parliament and at 1922 Committee.
- 20 July 2011: Matt Nixson dismissed as features editor of The Sun newspaper.
- 21 July 2011: NBC reports US-DOJ investigating Floorgraphics hacking.
- 22 July 2011: The Solicitors Regulation Authority announced an investigation into Harbottle & Lewis, the former solicitors of News International.
- 22 July 2011: The Financial Times reported that the UK media regulator Ofcom had begun an investigation into whether the phone-hacking scandal may have changed BSkyB's status as the "fit and proper" holder of a UK broadcasting licence.
- 26 July 2011: Graham Shear, a partner at the City law firm Berwin Leighton Paisner, lodged a breach of privacy claim against News International.
- 27 July 2011: The number of meetings between UK Cabinet Ministers and News Corporation staff over the prior 15 months was released. It was revealed that Cabinet ministers had over 60 private meetings with News Corporation executives, or 107 if social events were included, in the period.
- 29 July 2011: The legal team of Glenn Mulcaire issued a statement saying that Mulcaire had been "effectively employed" by News International as a private investigator and had not acted "unilaterally" when intercepting voicemails, but "on the instructions of others".
- 2 August 2011: Former News of the World managing editor Stuart Kuttner arrested.
- 10 August 2011: Former News of the World news editor Greg Miskiw arrested.
- 10 August 2011: Director of public affairs and internal communication for the Metropolitan Police, Dick Fedorcio, put on extended leave.
- 16 August 2011: The Guardian publishes a letter by Goodman that implicates senior staffers at the News of the World, including Coulson, in extensively discussing and covering-up phone hacking.
- 18 August 2011: Former News of the World US editor James Desborough arrested.
- 18 August 2011: The Independent Glenn Mulcaire suing News International. A private investigator jailed over phone hacking is taking legal action against News International, the company confirmed today.
- 19 August 2011: Former News of the World reporter Dan Evans arrested.
- 22 August 2011: (week of) News Corporation subsidiary Wireless Generation loses New York State contract for education information system provision.
- 30 August 2011: Former News of the World managing editor Stuart Kuttner re-arrested and bailed until a date in September 2011.
- 2 September 2011: Arrest of a 30-year-old man, whom The Guardian identified as Ross Hall, a former reporter for News of the World who wrote under the pen name of Ross Hindley.
- 6 September 2011: Daniel Cloke, Jonathan Chapman, Colin Myler and Tom Crone are questioned by the Committee for Media, Culture and Sports. Leveson inquiry has first hearing.
- 7 September 2011: Deputy football editor of The Times, Raoul Simons, arrested.
- 13 September 2011: Australian Government announces formal inquiry into behaviour of the Australian media.
- 14 September 2011: Culture, Media and Sport Committee decide to recall James Murdoch and Les Hinton for further questioning.. The Leveson Inquiry provides background, scope, and procedural plans for the inquiry.
- 10 November 2011: James Murdoch appears before the Culture, Media and Sport Committee.
- 21 November 2011: Leveson inquiry receives witness testimony from the family of Milly Dowler, solicitor Graham Shear, writer Joan Smith and Hugh Grant
- 15 February 2013: News Corporation pays undisclosed damages and apologises to 144 victims.
- 16 March 2013: Audio emerges of Rupert Murdoch criticising the ongoing investigation and portraying his papers as the real victims.

== Investigations ==
- 2003 - Operation Motorman
- 2003 - Operation Glade
- 2003 - House of Commons Select Committee on Culture, Media and Sport investigation into privacy and media intrusion
- 2006 - Hayman investigation into Royal Family phone hacking conducted by Metropolitan Police's Specialist Operations directorate.
- 2009 - John Yates review of 2006 Hayman investigation
- 2011 - Operation Weeting, Investigation conducted by Scotland Yard's Specialist Crime Directorate
- 2011 - Operation Elveden, Metropolitan Police investigation being led by Deputy Assistant Commissioner Sue Akers
- 2011 - House of Commons Select Committee on Culture, Media and Sport investigation
- June 2011 - Operation Tuleta
- July 2011 - Leveson Inquiry
- July 2011 - US Department of Justice investigation

== See also ==
- CTB v News Group Newspapers
- Mosley v News Group Newspapers Limited
- Sheridan v News International
