= Sean Hoare =

British journalist

- Hoare in 2002
- Born: 1963; Hertfordshire, England
- Died: July 18, 2011 (aged 47); Watford, Hertfordshire, England
- Occupation: Journalist

Sean Matthew Hoare (1963 – July 18, 2011) was a British entertainment journalist. He contributed to articles on show business, from actors to reality television stars. He played a central role in contributing to exposing the News International phone hacking scandal.

== Career ==
Hoare was described by The Guardian's Nick Davies as "coming from a working-class background of solid Arsenal supporters, always voted Labour, defined himself specifically as a 'clause IV' socialist who still believed in public ownership of the means of production." Hoare was a trainee reporter in the 1980s for the Watford Observer.

Hoare was a reporter for The Sun before joining The Sunday People, under editor Neil Wallis. He moved to the News of the World in June 2001, under editor Rebekah Brooks (then Rebekah Wade) but was sacked in 2005 by then editor Andy Coulson for drink and drug problems. He said in regard to his drug taking while employed by the News of the World, "I was paid to go out and take drugs with rock stars – get drunk with them, take pills with them, take cocaine with them. It was so competitive. You are going to go beyond the call of duty. You are going to do things that no sane man would do. You're in a machine." He claims to have often taken "three grammes of cocaine a day, spending about £1,000 a week" and would drink Jack Daniel's, and then would snort a line of cocaine as part of a "rock star's breakfast". His health deteriorated to the point that the doctor examining his liver remarked that he "must be dead". A former colleague said, "if you could imagine the stereotypical image of News of the World hack, it would be he."

In 2001, Hoare was awarded a Shafta Award (celebrating "the very worst in tabloid journalism") for his scoop on David and Victoria Beckham's purchase of an island off the Essex coast; the story, which turned out to be fiction, also won him the 20th anniversary "Shafta of Shaftas" in 2006. He won another Shafta in 2002, two in 2003, and a lifetime achievement Shafta in 2004.

== Phone hacking ==
In September 2010 Scotland Yard reopened its 2006 phone-hacking case against News of the World and Andy Coulson, following a New York Times Magazine piece published that month in which Hoare told reporters Don Van Natta, Jo Becker and Graham Bowley that Coulson had "actively encouraged" him to hack phones. Hoare had once been a close friend of Coulson. Following his statements for The New York Times Hoare was interviewed by Scotland Yard officers "under criminal caution," meaning that his statements could be used against him in possible future prosecution. Hoare had said of the phone hacking at the News of the World: "It was always done in the language of, 'Why don't you practise some of your dark arts on this', which was a metaphor for saying, 'Go and hack into a phone'. Such was the culture of intimidation and bullying that you would do it because you had to produce results. And, you know, to stand up in front of a Commons committee and say, 'I was unaware of this under my watch' was wrong."

Following his original statements for The New York Times and testimony before the police, Hoare re-entered the news in July 2011 when he and an anonymous colleague told reporters for the Times that British police had assisted reporters working for News of the World with cell-phone tracking, a power ordinarily used "for high-profile criminal cases and terrorism investigations," in exchange for bribes. Times reporter Don Van Natta wrote that he and Jo Becker had dinner with Hoare the night of the New York Times article's publication, describing him as "ailing but defiant and funny. And no regrets. All-courage." Metropolitan Police Commissioner Paul Stephenson and his deputy commissioner John Yates resigned within a week of Hoare's statements.

== Death ==
Hoare met reporters from The Guardian, to confirm the details of the last New York Times reports. He explained the appearance of severe injuries to the Guardian reporters, saying he had been injured the previous weekend while taking down a marquee erected for a children's party. He said he broke his nose and badly injured his foot when a relative accidentally struck him with a pole from the marquee. Hoare failed to return phone calls to his home in the week after his dinner with New York Times reporters. He was found dead at his home in Langley Road, Watford, Hertfordshire, at around 11 am on 18 July 2011. On the same day and within hours of his body being found, Hertfordshire Police stated that his death was "unexplained" but not suspicious, and that it could take weeks to establish a cause of death. On 21 July, Hoare's widow issued a statement in which she said that his death had come as a "tremendous shock". According to an inquest into his death, alcoholism resulting from media interest in the phone hacking scandal caused irreversible damage to Hoare's liver. The inquest ruled that he died from natural causes.

== In popular culture ==
In The Comic Strip Presents... TV special, "Red Top" (2016), the character of Johnny Bristol (played by Johnny Vegas) is based on Hoare. Bristol is an alcoholic, shambolic, and sleazy Sun reporter who, after being fired by Andy Coulson (Russell Tovey), tips off The Guardian about phone tapping at News International.

He is played by Sean Pertwee in the 2025 ITV drama about the News International phone hacking scandal, The Hack.

== See also ==
- Phone hacking scandal reference lists
