= Metropolitan Police role in the news media phone hacking scandal =

Aspect of a UK public scandal

This article provides a narrative beginning in 1999 of investigations by the Metropolitan Police Service (Met) of Greater London into the illegal acquisition of confidential information by agents in collaboration with the news media that is commonly referred to as the phone hacking scandal. The article discusses seven phases of investigations by the Met and several investigations of the Met itself, including critiques and responses regarding the Met's performance. Separate articles provide an overview of the scandal and a comprehensive set of reference lists with detailed background information.

By 2002, the practice by news media organizations of using private investigators ("law enforcement") to acquire confidential information was widespread. Some individuals used illegal methods to accomplish this. Victims of illegal phone hacking included celebrities, politicians, law enforcement officials, solicitors, and ordinary citizens.

As this illegal activity became apparent, suspects were arrested and some were convicted of crimes. Some victims retained solicitors upon learning their privacy had been violated, and filed suit against news media companies and their agents. Some victims received financial payments for violation of privacy. Successful suits and publicity from investigative news articles led to further disclosures, including the names of more victims, more documentary evidence of wrongdoing, admissions of wrongdoing by some news media agents, and payments potentially related to the scandal.

Allegations were made of poor judgement and cover-up by news media executives and law enforcement officials. As a result, additional investigations into illegal acquisition of confidential information were initiated and several senior executives and police officials were forced to resign. There were also significant commercial consequences of the scandal. Contemporary commentators made comparisons with the Watergate scandal.

The Metropolitan Police conducted several investigations between 1999 and 2011. The first three investigations, involving phone taps and seizure of records, successfully gathered large quantities of evidence that confidential information was being acquired illegally, sometimes with the help of public officials including policemen. By 2006, seven men had been found guilty, but no further arrests were made until 2011. The Met was criticized for not aggressively pursuing all the significant leads available from this evidence, for not adequately informing all individuals who were victims of the phone hacking, and for allegedly misleading the public and Parliament about the scope of the problem.

While continuing to investigate illegal acquisition of confidential information, the Met itself became the object of several investigations about the diligence of its probes and possible involvement of its own personnel in illegal activities. After the scope of the phone hacking scandal became generally known in July 2011, the top two officials of the Met resigned. The new Met leadership augmented the ongoing investigations with the unusual measure of bringing in an independent police organization to help. By mid-July 2011, there were as many as ten separate investigations active at the Met, Parliament and other government agencies.

== Investigations by the Metropolitan Police ==
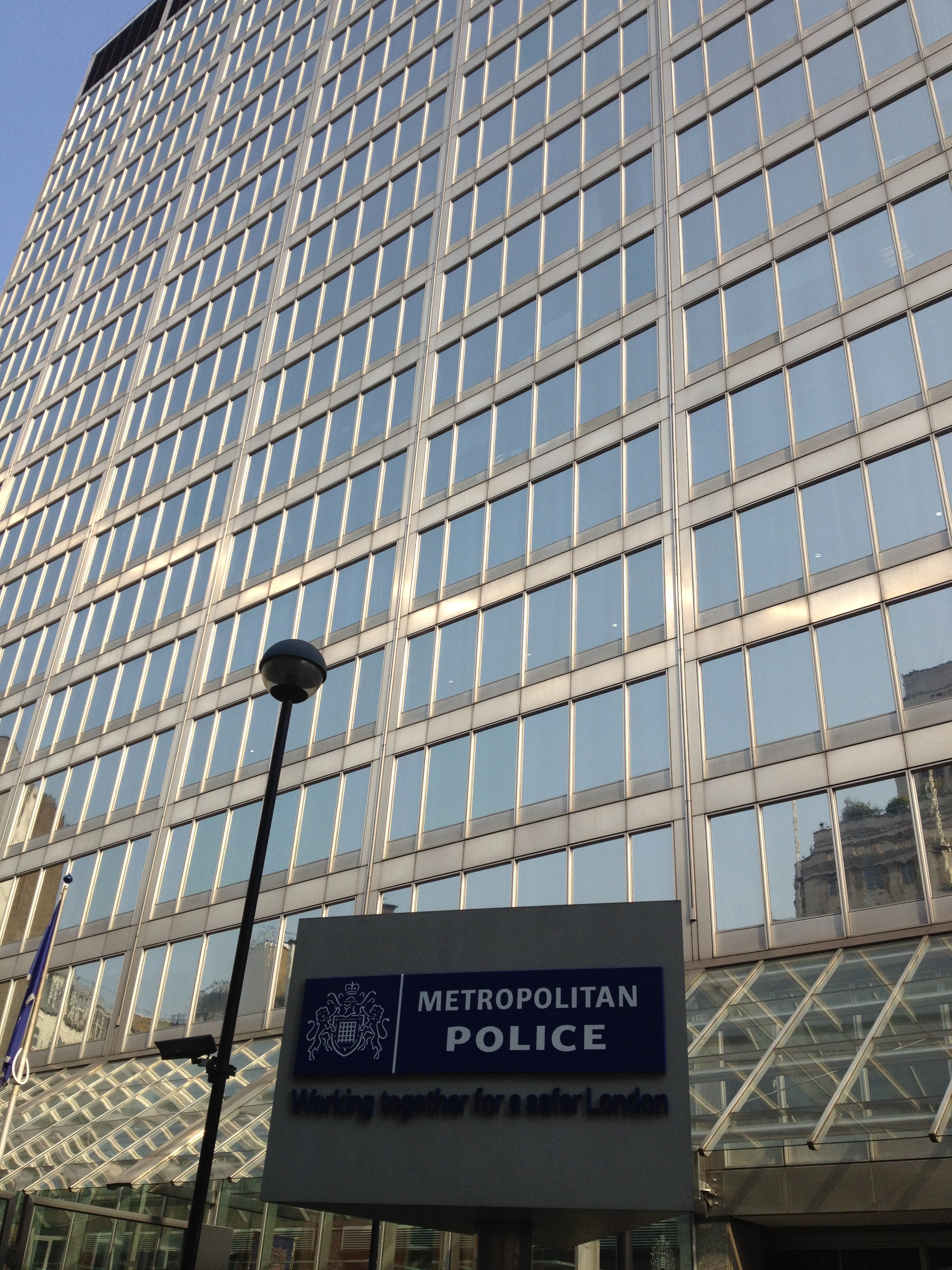
In 1999, the Metropolitan Police began investigating the widespread illegal acquisition of confidential information by private investigators and journalists. In 2011, the Met initiated intensive investigations into interception of voice mail, computer hacking, and official corruption, leading to more than 90 arrests.

=== Operation Nigeria (1999) ===
From at least the 1990s, private investigator Jonathan Rees reportedly bought information from former and serving police officers, customs officers, a VAT inspector, bank employees, burglars, and from blaggers who would telephone the Inland Revenue, the Driving & Vehicle Licensing Agency (DVLA), banks and phone companies, deceiving them into providing confidential information. He then sold that information to News of the World, the Daily Mirror, Sunday Mirror and the Sunday Times. News of the World alone paid Rees more than £150,000 a year.

In response, and because Rees was also suspected in the 1987 murder of his former partner, the Met's anti-corruption squad CIB3 ran Operation Nigeria. It involved tapping Rees' phone at his agency, Southern Investigations, from April to September 1999 to obtain evidence about the murder and about whether confidential information was being acquired illegally by police and/or reporters. Recorded telephone conversations revealed that Alex Marunchak of News of the World was a regular customer of the agency. It was determined that Rees was purchasing information from improper sources, but no evidence became public that Marunchak or other journalists had committed criminal offences or that they were aware of how Rees acquired the information. The bugging operation ended when it was learned that Rees was planning to plant drugs on a woman so that her husband, Rees' client, could win custody of their child. Rees and others whose voices were recorded during Operation Nigeria (including Austin Warnes, Duncan Hanrahan, Martin King, Tom Kingston, Sid Fillery) were successfully prosecuted and sentenced to jail for various offenses unrelated to illegal acquisition of confidential information.

Rees and another private investigator, Sid Fillery, who later became Rees' partner at Southern Investigations, were under suspicion for the 1987 murder of Daniel Morgan, yet another private investigator and Rees' partner at the time of his murder. Morgan's family claimed Morgan was planning an article to expose police corruption. One of the Met's officers investigating the murder charges, Detective Chief Superintendent David Cook, was warned by Surrey Police and Scotland Yard that he may have become a surveillance target of Sid Fillery. Fillery reportedly used his relationship with Alex Marunchak to arrange for Glenn Mulcaire, then doing work for News of the World, to obtain Cook's home address, his internal payroll number at the Metropolitan police, his date of birth and figures for the amount that he and his wife were paying for their mortgage. Surveillance of Cook is also reported to have involved physically following him and his young children, attempts to access his voicemail and that of his wife, and possibly attempts to send a "Trojan horse" email in an attempt to steal information from his computer. Paperwork reportedly in the possession of the Scotland Yard shows that "Mulcaire did this on the instructions of Greg Miskiw, the paper's assistant editor and a close friend of Marunchak." When one of the two vans parked outside Cook's home was stopped by Met officers, the driver turned out to be a photojournalist for News of the World. The vans were also licensed to the newspaper. During the same week, it appeared that attempts had been made to open letters which had been left in Cook's external postbox, indicating a "possible attempt to pervert the course of justice."

The Met handled this apparent attempt by agents of News of the World to interfere with a murder inquiry by having informal discussions with Rebekah Brooks, then editor for News of the World. "Scotland Yard took no further action, apparently reflecting the desire of Dick Fedorcio, who had a close working relationship with Brooks, to avoid unnecessary friction with the News of the World." Fedorico was Director of Public Affairs and Internal Communication for the Met.

As of July 2011, Cook and his wife were believed to be preparing a legal action against the News of the World, Marunchak, Miskiw and Mulcaire. Marunchak was also identified by BBC as the News of the World executive who had arranged for someone to plant a Trojan on the computer of a former British intelligence NCO, Ian Hurst.

In 2000, Rees was sentenced to seven years in prison and served five. Upon release in 2005, he resumed his private investigative work for News of the World, where Andy Coulson by that time had succeeded Rebekah Brooks as editor. Coulson has maintained in evidence given to parliament and under oath in court that he did not know anything about illegal activity during the seven years he spent near or at the top of the News of the World.

No one was charged with illegal acquisition of confidential information as a result of Operation Nigeria. According to Nick Davies, reporter for The Guardian, the Met collected hundreds of thousands of documents during the investigations into Jonathan Rees over his links with corrupt officers and over his alleged murder of Daniel Morgan. Although charges of murder against Rees were dismissed in 2011, Mr. Davies believes these "boxloads" of paperwork "could include explosive new evidence of illegal news-gathering by the News of the World and other papers."

=== Operation Glade (2003) ===
For years, private investigators in addition to Rees were plying the lucrative trade in illegally acquired confidential information. The specialty of John Boyall's agency, Liberty Resources & Intelligent Research Limited, was acquiring information from confidential databases. Boyall's assistant was Glenn Mulcaire until the autumn of 2001, when News of the World's assistant editor, Greg Miskiw, attracted Mulcaire away by giving him a full-time contract to do work for the newspaper.

Boyall eventually attracted the attention of the Information Commissioner's Office (ICO), which is not a police organization but an independent authority with a mandate to "uphold information rights in the public interest, promoting openness by public bodies and data privacy for individuals."

With the assistance of the Devon & Cornwall police, the ICO raided Boyall's premises in November 2002. Documents seized there led the ICO to yet another private investigator, Steve Whittamore, who, with his wife, ran JJ information Limited. In March 2003, Whittamore's premises were raided under what was by then dubbed Operation Motorman. Documents from this raid established that confidential information was illegally acquired from telephone companies, the Driving & Vehicle Licensing Agency (DVLA) and the Police National Computer. It was reported that "media, especially newspapers, insurance companies and local authorities chasing council tax arrears all appear in the sales ledger of the dodgy agency." Prices were clearly established: "Ex-directory telephone numbers cost [a] Hampshire detective £40, and he sold them on for £70. A vehicle check cost £70, and customers were charged £150. And so on."

In May 2006, the ICO issued a report titled "What price privacy?" Afterward, they received a request under the Freedom of Information Act "for further information about the publications that the 305 journalists were employed by and a breakdown of their activity." Some information was provided to the requester, and a follow-up report was issued by the ICO in December 2006 titled "What price privacy now?"" However, much of the information obtained through Operation Motorman has never been released to the public. As recently as September 2011, the ICO declined to release information under another Freedom of Information Act request.

Many people were involved in the illegal trafficking of confidential information. Paul Marshall, a former civilian communications officer based at Tooting police station in London, provided confidential police information to Alan King, a retired police officer, who passed it along to Boyall, who gave it to Whittamore, who in turn sold it to agents of news media organizations. Whittamore's network of information gatherers gave him access to confidential records at telephone companies, banks, post offices, hotels, theatres, and prisons, including BT Group, Crédit Lyonnais, Goldman Sachs, Hang Seng Bank, Glen Parva prison, and Stocken prison. "

Although there was evidence of many people being engaged in illegal activity, relatively few were questioned. Operation Motorman's lead investigator said in a 2006 inquiry that "his team were told not to interview journalists involved. The investigator...accused authorities of being too 'frightened' to tackle journalists."

Learning that Whittamore was obtaining information from the police national computer, the Information Commissioner contacted the Metropolitan Police, then headed by Commissioner Ian Blair with Deputy Commissioner Sir Paul Stephenson second in command. In response, the Met's anti-corruption unit initiated Operation Glade.

Whittamore had kept detailed records of his transactions with his clients, including the News of the World. "He identified 27 different journalists as commissioning his work – well over half of the news and feature writers on the paper, spending tens of thousands of pounds. News of the World's Greg Miskiw alone was recorded as making 90 requests." Invoices submitted to News International, which owned News of the World, "sometimes made explicit reference to obtaining a target's details from their phone number or their vehicle registration." Miskiw was reportedly questioned by the Met about whether he had paid cash to Boyall to obtain information from the police computer, but no charges were made.

Between February 2004 and April 2005, the Crown Prosecution Service, then headed by DPP Ken Macdonald, charged ten men working for private detective agencies with crimes relating to the illegal acquisition of confidential information. No journalists were charged. Whittamore, Boyall, King, and Marshall pleaded guilty in April 2005. According to ICO head Richard Thomas, "each pleaded guilty yet, despite the extent and the frequency of their admitted criminality, each was conditionally discharged [for two years], raising important questions for public policy." The following year John Gunning was convicted of acquiring private subscriber information from British Telecom's database.

According to Nick Davies of The Guardian, the illegal acquisition was not limited to the rich and powerful and the prosecution was inadequate.

Documents seized from Stephen Whittamore's home in 2003 included "more than 13,000 requests for confidential information from newspapers and magazines." There is no indication that a significant portion of this was evaluated by the police as potential evidence against other persons. It was not until February 2011, when Mr Justice Geoffrey Vos ordered the disclosure of this material in response to the phone hacking claim being brought by the politician George Galloway, that any significant release of the seized material was made.

=== The Royal Household / Goodman inquiry (2006) ===
In November 2005, within months of the guilty pleas resulting from Operation Glade, the Metropolitan Police Service was notified of irregularities with the telephone voicemails of members of the royal household. By January 2006, Scotland Yard determined there was an "unambiguous trail" to Clive Goodman, the News of the World royal reporter, and to Glenn Mulcaire, a private investigator who was contracted to do work for the paper." The voicemail of one royal aide had been accessed 433 times.

The Met's counter-terrorism group, then led by assistant commissioner Andy Hayman, had responsibility for the security of the royal family and was charged with making the investigation. There was concern about diverting resources to this effort because of the demands of other priorities, including following up on the 2005 London transit bombings and surveillance operations on possible bomb plotters.

On August 8, 2006, detectives from the Met went to News of the World with a search warrant to search Clive Goodman's desk. They reportedly faced resistance in the newspaper's lobby from executives and lawyers for the paper over searching the newsroom as two veteran reporters stuffed documents into trash bags and removed them. As it happened, detectives limited their search to Goodman's desk.

At the same time, police raided the home of Glenn Mulcaire and seized "11,000 pages of handwritten notes listing nearly 4,000 celebrities, politicians, sports stars, police officials and crime victims whose phones may have been hacked." The names included eight members of the royal family and their staff. There were "dozens of notebooks and two computers containing 2,978 complete or partial mobile phone numbers and 91 PIN codes; at least three names of other News of the World journalists; and 30 tape recordings made by Mulcaire. In the upper-left-hand corner of each document page was the name of the reporter or editor Mulcaire was helping. Also seized was a recording of Mulcaire instructing a journalist how to hack into private voice mail, particularly easy if the phone's factory settings for privacy had not been changed.

The records also included a transcript of voice mail messages between Professional Football Association's Gordon Taylor and his legal adviser, Jo Anderson. This document was titled "Transcript for Neville" and is alleged to have been for Neville Thurlbeck, another reporter for News of the World. The email appeared to indicate that use of illegal interception of voice mail messages was being used at News of the World by more than just Clive Goodman. Met detectives did not then question Thurlbeck or any other News of the World journalist or executive as part of their investigation. This may have been in part because of the Met's relationship with the press.

The Met's investigation under Hayman stayed narrowly focused on the victims in the royal household and a few other victims on a short "target list" obtained during the Mulcaire raid. Hayman had seen but had not acted upon a much longer list that was 8 to 10 pages in length, single-spaced, that "read like a British society directory." The five other victims that were included in the indictment of Mulcaire were notified about violation of privacy. Of the thousands of people who may also have been victims, the Met decided to notify only those that were members of the government, police, military, or otherwise of national-security concern. Politician George Galloway was notified by a detective on 24 August 2006 that his voicemail had been hacked and advised to change his PIN code to prevent re-occurrence. Galloway asked who had accessed his phone messages, but the detective refused to tell him.

Hayman's investigation also stayed narrowly focused on the activities of Goodman and Mulcaire. No News of the World executives or reporters other than Goodman were questioned about phone hacking until Operation Weeting was initiated more than four years later.

Met officials consulted with the Crown Prosecution Service (CPS) headed by Director of Public Prosecutions (DPP) Ken Macdonald about the best general way to proceed with the investigation and prosecution. The Met did not disclose all available evidence to senior CPS prosecutors at this time, reportedly omitting documents indicating that reporters in addition to Clive Goodman appeared to have been using Mulcaire's services. The CPS appears to have provided some rationale to the Met for limiting the investigation by initially advising that "phone hacking was only an offence if messages had been intercepted before they were listened to by the intended recipient." In fact, the hacking was illegal under the 1990 Computer Misuse Act regardless of whether messages had already been listened to by their intended recipient even if it was not illegal under the 2000 Regulation of Investigatory Powers Act. The precise nature of the guidance given by CPS to the Met became the subject of public disagreement between them in 2011, at which time it was noted, among other things, that the charges brought against Goodman and Mulcaire included counts where there was no evidence provided regarding whether messages had already been heard or not.

Goodman and Mulcaire were arrested in August 2006. During their court proceedings, a small number of other victims of Mulcaire's phone hacking were mentioned, including Sky Andrew, Max Clifford, Simon Hughes, Elle Macpherson, and Gordon Taylor. On 29 November 2006, Goodman and Mulcaire pleaded guilty to conspiracy to intercept communications without lawful authority with respect to three of the royal aides. The work of the Metropolitan police had resulted in guilty pleas within 12 month of when the crimes against royal aides were committed. However, it was clear from court testimony that Mulcaire had hacked at least five other phones and that he did work for more than just Goodman.

Within weeks of the arrests of Goodman and Mulcaire, a "senior police officer" reportedly advised Rebekah Brooks there was strong circumstantial evidence in the documents seized from Mulcaire that News of the World journalists in addition to Goodman were implicated in phone hacking. In early autumn 2006, Tom Crone, legal manager for News International, reportedly contacted several other executives, including then News of the World editor Andy Coulson, informing them of what the Met told Brooks. Coulson resigned, accepting responsibility for the illegal activity, but denied knowing about it.

The documents seized during the Mulcaire raid remained largely unevaluated until the autumn of 2010. No one at News of the World other than Goodman was questioned by the Met until March 2011. Nonetheless, “senior Scotland Yard officials assured Parliament, judges, lawyers, potential hacking victims, the news media and the public that there was no evidence of widespread hacking by the tabloid.” According to The New York Times, “the police agency and News International … became so intertwined that they wound up sharing the goal of containing the investigation.

Mary Ellen Field was a highly paid adviser to Elle Macpherson. Macpherson blamed Field when confidential information about Macpherson began appearing in News of the World and fired her. After Glenn Mulcaire was arrested and jailed, acknowledging he had hacked Macpherson's phone, Field wrote to the police requesting information that might help exonerate her. No one replied.

=== The Yates review of evidence (2009) ===
On 8 July 2009, The Guardian published three articles authored by journalist Nick Davies and Vikram Dodd titled:

1. "Murdoch papers paid £1m to gag phone-hacking victims"
2. "Trail of hacking and deceit under nose of Tory PR chief."
3. "Ex-Murdoch editor Andrew Neil: News of the World revelations one of most significant media stories of our time."

The articles alleged:

- Rupert Murdoch's News Group Newspapers (NGN) agreed to large settlements with hacking victims, including Gordon Taylor. The settlements included gagging provisions to prevent release to the public of evidence then held by the Metropolitan Police Service that NGN journalists repeatedly used criminal methods to get stories. "News Group then persuaded the court to seal the file on Taylor's case to prevent all public access, even though it contained prima facie evidence of criminal activity." That evidence included documents seized in raids by the Information Commissioner's Office and by the Met.
- If the suppressed evidence became public, hundreds more phone hacking victims of NGN might be a position to take legal action against NGN newspapers including News of the World and The Sun. It might also provoke police inquiries into reporters and senior newspaper executives.
- When Andy Coulson, then chief press adviser to Prime Minister David Cameron, was editor and deputy editor at News of the World, journalists there openly engaged private investigators that used illegal phone hacking, paying invoices for this work that itemised illegal acts.
- Neil also said that everybody at News of the World knew what was going on, that there was no public interest defense for the phone hacking, and that the way the case was pursued raises serious questions about the Metropolitan Police, the Crown Prosecution Service, and the court which, "faced with evidence of conspiracy and systemic illegal actions,...agreed to seal the evidence."
- The Met held evidence that thousands of mobile phones had been hacked into by agents of News of the World, including Members of Parliament from all three parties and including cabinet ministers.
- The Metropolitan Police decided not to inform the public figures whose phones had been targeted and the Crown Prosecution Service decided not prosecute News Group executives.
- Statements by executives misled a parliamentary select committee, the Press Complaints Commission and the public about the extent of their newspaper's illegal acquisition of confidential information.

Later that same day, Metropolitan Police Service Commissioner Sir Paul Stephenson asked Assistant Commissioner John Yates to take a fresh look at the phone hacking to see if it should be reopened in the light of these allegations. Yates reportedly took just eight hours to consult with senior detectives and Crown Prosecution lawyers to conclude there was no fresh material that could lead to further convictions. His review did not include examination of possible leads from the thousands of pages of the available evidence seized in raids between 1999 and 2006.

In September 2009, Yates reported his conclusions to the Commons Culture, Media and Sport Committee saying there were insufficient evidence for arresting or even interviewing anyone else and that no additional evidence had been brought forward. Upon review of the first inquiry, he concluded that there were just a handful, only hundreds, not thousands of potential victims. Although Yates was aware of the "Transcript For Neville" email during his fresh look, he did not believe it would be worthwhile to interview Neville Thurlbeck. Further, Yates did not believe it would be worthwhile to interview other journalists at News of the World that Glenn Mulcaire may have worked with or to look into the cases of victims beyond the eight that were pursued in 2006.

Eventually, as queries continued to come in from celebrities and politicians asking if they had been victims of hacking, Yates directed that the evidence from the Mulcaire raid that had been in stored in trash bags for three years be entered into a computer database. Ten people were assigned this task. Yates himself did not look at the evidence saying later, “I'm not going to go down and look at bin bags. I am supposed to be an Assistant Commissioner." He did not re-open the investigation.

=== Operation Weeting (2011): interception of voicemail ===
Some of the few individuals who did become aware that their voicemail messages had been intercepted by Glenn Mulcaire for News of the World initiated legal action against Mulcaire and the newspaper. Progress of these suits and the evidence released by the Met to the courts as a consequence received public scrutiny as The Guardian and other newspapers kept the story in public view.

In 2005, Mark Lewis, solicitor for the Professional Footballers' Association, suspected that News of the World hacked phones to get information for a proposed story concerning Gordon Taylor. His beliefs were confirmed late 2007 at Mulcaire's judicial proceedings, at which Mulcaire pleaded guilty and apologized to Taylor and seven others for accessing their voicemail messages. Lewis sued News of the World on behalf of Taylor, and filed actions with the court to obtain relevant documents. As a result, on 27 June 2008, the court ordered that documents held by the Metropolitan Police that had been obtained in the raids on Mulcaire and Steve Whittamore be turned over to Lewis. One of these documents was the "Transcript For Neville" email. Within 24 hours, News of the World began settlement discussions. Taylor received £700,000, and Lewis became the first solicitor to win a settlement from the newspaper for phone hacking.

The settlement remained secret until it was reported by The Guardian on 8 July 2009 in one of the three articles relating to phone hacking published that day. Days later, Max Clifford, another of the eight victims named in the 2006 indictment of Mulcaire, announced his intentions to sue. In March 2010, News International agreed to settle his suit for £1,000,000. These awards encouraged other possible victims and their solicitors to explore possibilities, resulting in more and more queries to the Metropolitan Police about whether their names were on Mulcaire's lists. Responses from the Met were difficult to obtain. Solicitor Charlotte Harris, who represented Clifford, wrote to the Metropolitan Police about other clients, Leslie Ash and her husband Lee Chapman, "asking whether they had also been hacked. The police took three months to reply."

On 3 July 2009, shortly before The Guardian articles were published, Stuart Kuttner resigned from News of the World. He had been managing editor.

The Commons Culture, Media and Sport Committee had begun holding hearings on phone hacking beginning in March 2007, shortly after Goodman and Mulcaire were sent to prison. These hearings were renewed in July 2009, shortly after The Guardian's three articles were published. After taking testimony from the police and from several News International representatives, the Committee's released its findings February 2010. The Committee was critical of the police for not pursuing "evidence that merited a wider investigation" and criticized News International executives for their “collective amnesia.” The hearings did not result in a renewed police investigation, there being no enthusiasm at Scotland Yard to go beyond Mulcaire and Goodman.

On 1 September 2010, The New York Times published a lengthy article by Don Van Natta Jr., Jo Becker, and Graham Bowley echoing the Committee's concerns and specifically contradicting testimony made by former News of the World editor Andy Coulson in which he claimed not to be aware of phone hacking. Among other things, the article alleged:

- The Met failed to follow leads that indicated News of the World routinely used phone hacking to get leads for stories.
- Several Met investigators said the Met "was reluctant to conduct a wider inquiry in part because of its close relationship with News of the World."
- Former editor Andy Coulson, who was then the communications director for Prime Minister David Cameron, had been fully aware that phone hacking was being used by his newspaper's journalists and that he even encouraged it.

On 15 December 2010, The Guardian published an article authored by Nick Davies disclosing that documents, seized from the home of private investigator Glenn Mulcaire by Metropolitan Police Service in 2006 and only recently made available to the public by court action, implied that News of the World editor Ian Edmondson specifically instructed Mulcaire to intercept voice messages of Sienna Miller, Jude Law, and several others. The documents also implied that Mulcaire was engaged by others at News of the World, including chief reporter Neville Thurlbeck and assistant editor Greg Miskiw, who had then worked directly for editor Andy Coulson. This contradicted testimony to the Culture, Media and Sport Committee by newspaper executives and senior Met officials that Mulcaire acted on his own and that there was no evidence of hacking by other than him and a single "rogue reporter," namely Clive Goodman. Within five weeks of this article appearing, Ian Edmundson was suspended from News of the World, Andy Coulson resigned as Chief Press Secretary to David Cameron, the Crown Prosecution Service began a review of evidence it had, and the Met renewed its investigation into phone hacking, something it had declined to do since 2007.

The renewed Met investigation was titled Operation Weeting and began on 26 January 2011. It was led by Sue Akers, a Deputy Assistant Commissioner with the Metropolitan Police, and was focused on the illegal interception of voicemail. Between 45 and 60 officers began looking over the 11,000 pages of evidence seized from Mulcaire back in August 2006. By mid-April, Thurlbeck, Edmondson, and James Weatherup, a senior News of the World journalist, had been arrested.

In May 2011, News International's law firm, Hickman & Rose, hired former Director of Public Prosecutions Ken Macdonald to review the emails newspaper executives had used as the basis of their claim that no one at News of the World but Clive Goodman had been involved in phone hacking. Macdonald immediately concluded there was evidence of criminal activity, including payments to serving police officers, leading the Met to open an investigation focused on bribery and corruption within its ranks. (See discussion of Operation Elveden, below.)

On 4 July 2011, The Guardian published an article authored by Nick Davies and Amelia Hill titled "Missing Milly Dowler's voicemail was hacked by News of the World." This article disclosed that voicemail messages from Milly Dowler's phone had been hacked back in 2002 by an agent of News of the World looking for a story. This disclosure inflamed public opinion and led to loss of advertising for News of the World and subsequent closure of this 168-year-old newspaper. Within two weeks, senior News Corporation executives resigned, including Les Hinton, chief executive of Dow Jones & Company, Rebekah Brooks, chief executive of News International, Tom Crone, legal manager of News International, and Lawrence Jacobs, general counsel for News Corporation. Also within two weeks, the two top officials of the Metropolitan Police Service resigned, namely Commissioner Paul Stephenson and Assistant Commissioner John Yates.

The new Met Commissioner, Bernard Hogan-Howe, took the unusual step of asking a team from an outside police force, the Durham Constabulary headed by Jon Stoddart, to review the work of Operation Weeting.

Between 4 July and early September 2011, about ten people, mostly editors and journalists who had at one time worked for News of the World, were arrested in conjunction with illegal acquisition of confidential information. These included Rebekah Brooks, Andy Coulson, Neil Wallis, Stuart Kuttner, Greg Miskiw, James Desborough, Dan Evans, Ross Hall, and The Times deputy editor Raoul Simons.

On 22 September 2011, The Independent published an article authored by James Cusick and Cahal Milmo reporting that, within weeks of the arrests of Clive Goodman and Glenn Mulcaire in August 2006, "a senior police officer" advised Rebekah Brooks there was substantial "circumstantial evidence" in the documents seized from Mulcaire that News of the World journalists in addition to Goodman were implicated in phone hacking. It also reported that in early autumn 2006, Tom Crone, legal manager for News International, contacted several other executives, including then News of the World editor Andy Coulson, informing them of what the Met told Brooks. News International executives, including Crone, had maintained they were not aware of such evidence until almost two years later, in May 2008, when they received a copy of the "Transcript for Neville" in conjunction with Gordon Taylor's lawsuit.

On 15 May 2012, the Crown Prosecution Service (CPS) charged six individuals with conspiring to pervert the course of justice. Charged in relation to removal of documents and computers to conceal them from investigating detectives were former News International CEO Rebekah Brooks, her husband, her personal assistant, her bodyguard, her chauffeur, and the head of security at News International. These charges were made about 1 year after the Metropolitan Police Service reopened its dormant investigation into phone hacking, about 3 years after the then Assistant Commissioner of the Metropolitan Police Service told the Commons Culture, Media and Sport Committee that "no additional evidence has come to light," 5 years after News International executives began claiming that phone hacking was the work of a single "rogue reporter, 10 years after The Guardian began reporting that the Met had evidence of widespread illegal acquisition of confidential information, and 13 years after the Met began accumulating "boxloads" of that evidence but kept it unexamined in trash bags at Scotland Yard.

On 24 July 2012, charges were brought against eight former employees or agents of News of the World including head editors Rebekah Brooks and Andy Coulson. All eight were charged regarding illegal interception of communications relating to specific individuals

=== Operations Tuleta (2011): computer hacking ===
After Jonathan Rees was released from prison in 2005, he resumed private investigative work for News of the World, then under the leadership of Andy Coulson. Documents seized as part of the ongoing investigation of Rees for the murder of Daniel Morgan included 5 July 2006 fax containing extracts from Ian Hurst's emails sent by Rees to the News of the World's Dublin office which included information on "Stakeknife". Hurst had not had contact with Stakeknife. Mr Marunchak was then editor of the newspaper's Irish edition.

At that time, Martin Ingram, aka Ian Hurst, was a British Army intelligence sergeant in Northern Ireland who falsely claimed responsibility for contact with the agent "Stakeknife," reportedly a double agent imbedded in the Provisional IRA and potentially at high risk for assassination. Very few people knew of the agent's whereabouts, which was kept secret for his protection. Hurst's personal computer was allegedly hacked by Marunchak with a Trojan programme which copied emails and relayed them to the hacker who in turn passed them along to newspaper personnel, putting the agent at risk.

No apparent investigative action was taken by the Met from the time documentary evidence of the computer hacking came into its possession until 10 June 2011, when Operation Tuleta was launched. Like Operation Weeting, Tuleta was led by the Met's Sue Akers. Hurst stated the Met notified him of the 2006 hacking in July 2011.

=== Operation Elveden (2011): bribery, corruption ===
From 2003 to 2008, Ken Macdonald was Director of Public Prosecutions (DPP) at the Crown Prosecution Service (CPS). During this period, Andy Hayman of the Metropolitan Police Service limited the Met's investigation of alleged phone hacking to Clive Goodman and Glenn Mulcaire. John Yates later claimed the investigation was limited as a result of collaboration with the CPS because CPS indicated no law was broken unless the voice messages were listened to by phone hackers before the intended recipient listed to them. Macdonald recused himself from these strategy sessions because of his acquaintance with the then editor of News of the World, Andy Coulson.

On 29 November 2006, Clive Goodman pleaded guilty to illegally acquiring confidential information of the royal household to write stories for News of the World. A few months later, Goodman was sentenced to prison and dismissed from News of the World. He filed a wrongful dismissal suit, claiming in part that others were well aware of his activities. This suit was settled in March 2007. News International, owner of News of the World, selected about 300 emails between Goodman and other News of the World reporters and editors and asked the law firm of Harbottle & Lewis (H&L) to review them and report whether there was evidence that others, including Andy Coulson, were aware of Goodman's hacking or engaged in hacking themselves. H&L also served as counsel to the royal family at the time. On 29 May 2007, H&L's Lawrence Abramson sent the final draft of a letter whose text had negotiated between the law firm and its client to News International, stating that the review of the e-mails had found no such evidence. In his testimony to the Commons Culture, Media and Sport Committee on 19 July 2011, News International's James Murdoch claimed to have relied on this letter containing "outside legal advice from senior counsel” to publicly maintain that the phone hacking had been the work of a single "rogue reporter," namely Goodman. These 300 emails were not at that time provided to the police.

News International faced growing scepticism and criticism from newspapers, Parliament, and the police about the single "rogue reporter" stance. There were also questions about illegal action by the police themselves. As a result, News International's parent company, News Corporation arranged for another review of the emails. In May 2011, their law firm, Hickman & Rose, hired Ken Macdonald, still an acquaintance of former News of the World editor, Andy Coulson, to review the emails H&L had held since 2007. When Macdonald reviewed the e-mails, it took him less than five minutes' to conclude that it was "blindingly obvious" that they represented evidence of criminal wrongdoing. He advised the News Corporation board to give the emails to the police, "a move that set off the current investigation into the payments made to the police by journalists at The News of the World. The company then trawled through other documents, including its cash authorization records, and found 130,000 pounds’ worth of payments to a group of officers over several years, according to officials with knowledge of the inquiry. Included within those records was documentation of a thousand-pound cash withdrawal around the date of Mr. Goodman's e-mail concerning his purchase of the Green Book from a police officer."

On 20 June, Macdonald gave papers he had reviewed relating to allegations of illegal payments to the police. On 4 July, The Guardian broke the Millie Dowler story. On 6 July 2011, it was announced that Operation Elveden had been initiated to investigate alleged bribery and corruption within the Metropolitan Police.

== Investigations of the Metropolitan Police ==
As the Met initiated new investigations, it became the object of investigations by others.

=== Investigative reporting by newspapers ===
As early as 2002, when the Metropolitan Police's anti-corruption unit was engaged in Operation Nigeria, The Guardian raised questions about whether all the evidence relating to police corruption was being pursued.

Between February 2004 and April 2005, as a result of Operation Glade, ten men working for private detective agencies were charged with crimes relating to the illegal acquisition of confidential information. Some of the information they obtained reportedly came from serving police officers. Only four of the accused were ultimately found guilty of crimes but did not serve prison time. The Guardian reported that the investigation and prosecution ended in fiasco since Whittamore and three others received conditional discharges. A trial of other members collapsed before it had even gotten started." The Guardian also observed that enormous amounts of information seized in raids had not been evaluated.

After the 2006 imprisonment of Clive Goodman and Glenn Mulcaire, and with assurances from News International executive and senior Metropolitan Police officials that a thorough investigation of evidence identified only these two as being involved in phone hacking, the public perception was that the matter was closed. Nick Davies and other journalists from The Guardian continued to critically examine evidence available from court cases and reported information contradicting official positions.

Other newspapers, including The New York Times, The Daily Telegraph and The Independent, also published key articles critical of the Met's performance. These news media organizations persisted in obtaining and evaluating information from court records, Freedom of Information requests, and field contacts, reportedly including police officers. As in the case of the Watergate scandal of 1972, dogged investigative reporting led to public inquiries by national oversight bodies, intensified police investigations, and resignations by senior law enforcement officials.

=== Investigation by national oversight bodies ===
==== Commons Culture, Media, and Sport Select Committee ====
The House of Commons Culture, Media and Sport Committee held hearings regarding phone hacking by news media companies in March 2007, July 2009, and again in July 2011. Representatives of the Metropolitan Police Service gave evidence to the committee on several occasions, including oral evidence as follows:

- 2 September 2009: John Yates, Assistant Commissioner
- 2 September 2009: Philip Williams, Detective Chief Superintendent
- 24 March 2011: John Yates, Acting Deputy Commissioner

===== March 2007 =====
The 2007 inquiry regarding "Privacy and media intrusion" began shortly after Goodman and Mulcaire were sentenced. It was focused on activity at News of the World. The then executive chairman of News International, Les Hinton, assured the Committee that a "full, rigorous internal inquiry" had been carried out and, to his knowledge, Goodman was the only person at News of the World that knew about hacking. Hinton said, “I believe absolutely that Andy Coulson did not have knowledge of what was going on.”

===== July 2009 =====
Prompted by the allegations in the three articles published by The Guardian around 8 July 2009, the Committee convened new hearings. Chairman John Whittingdale questioned whether the Committee had been misled by News International executives who testified two years before that Goodman and Mulcaire acted alone. The Committee again heard evidence from Les Hinton, then chief executive officer of Dow Jones & Company, and Andy Coulson, then director of communications for the Conservative Party. They also heard from Met assistant commissioner John Yates and Detective chief superintendent Philip Williams. The Committee's findings, released in February 2010, were critical of News International executives for their “collective amnesia” and critical of the police for not pursuing "evidence that merited a wider investigation."

===== July 2011 =====
After The Guardian publicized the 2002 hacking of Milly Dowler's phone, the Committee renewed hearings to follow up on the 2009 inquiry into press standards, privacy and libel. Again evidence was given by John Yates and News International executives, this time including Rebekah Brooks, James Murdoch, and Rupert Murdoch. By this time, there was substantial evidence from various sources that phone hacking had been widespread, that senior newspaper executives were aware of it sooner than had been claimed, and that Parliament had been misled.

==== Home Affairs Committee ====
The Home Affairs Select Committee held hearings regarding phone hacking by news media companies beginning in July 2009 and in September 2010.

===== July 2009 =====
Like the Commons Culture, Media and Sport Committee, the Home Affairs Select Committee questioned the Met's decision not to reopen the investigation following allegations that 27 other News International reporters may have illegally commissioned private investigators to carry out tasks. The Met's assistant commissioner John Yates responded that he had only looked into the original inquiry of Goodman.

===== September 2010 =====
As information continued to emerge from court cases and investigative reporting, the Home Affairs Committee initiated another inquiry on 1 September 2010. The Committee again received evidence from the Met, newspaper journalists and executives,

Shortly after the hacking of Milly Dowler's phone became public in 2011, committee chairman Keith Vaz wrote to Prime Minister David Cameron asking him to consider points raised during the committee's inquiry, including:

- "Why there was such an extensive failure by the Metropolitan Police properly to investigate allegations of telephone hacking and other illegal activity when those allegations were first made;
- "Whether the advice on the interpretation of section 1 of RIPA given by the CPS inappropriately limited the scope of the Metropolitan Police inquiry in 2006
- "The police response to such offences, especially the treatment of those whose communications have been intercepted;
- "The legal situation surrounding payment of police officers;
- "Whether police officers were compromised by their relationships with journalists during the 2006 inquiry;
- "Whether police officers were subject to blackmail by those they were investigating;
- "Whether criticism of the Metropolitan Police Service was suppressed by the use of public money to threaten legal action;
- "Whether there should be advice to/restrictions on senior public officials such as the Director of Public Prosecutions about taking employment with those previously subject to investigations in which the officials were involved."

The committee issued its report finding that difficulties justifying the failure to investigate further were insufficient and that there appeared simply to be no real overcome obstacles.

==== Leveson Inquiry ====
Two days after The Guardian article regarding Milly Dowler was published, Prime Minister David Cameron announced that a public government inquiry would be initiated. Cameron named Lord Justice Leveson to chair the inquiry into phone hacking at News of the World and other newspapers, the diligence of the initial police inquiry, alleged illegal payments to police by the press, and the general culture and ethics of the media, including broadcasters and social media.

The Leveson Inquiry would be conducted in two parts. Part 1 of the inquiry would focus on ethical questions, specifically "the culture, practices and ethics of the press, including contacts between the press and politicians and the press and the police." Part 2 would focus on legal questions, specifically "the extent of unlawful or improper conduct within News International, other media organisations or other organisations. It will also consider the extent to which any relevant police force investigated allegations relating to News International, and whether the police received corrupt payments or were otherwise complicit in misconduct." Part 2 would not begin right away because of ongoing investigations by law enforcement organizations. The Leveson Inquiry's press release of September 2011 named the Met along with 46 celebrities, politicians, sportsmen, other public figures, and members of the public who may have been victims of media intrusion, granting them all "core participant" status in the initial module of the inquiry. Core participants could, through their legal representatives, ask questions of witnesses giving oral evidence.

=== Internal Met investigations ===
By early July 2011, Metropolitan Police Service commissioner Sir Paul Stephenson was facing questions and accusations from several quarters about potential conflicts of interest arising from his social relationships with News International executives.

On 14 July 2011, Neil Wallis was arrested. Wallis was formerly executive editor at News of the World and was arrested on suspicion of conspiring to intercept communications In 2009 and 2010, while Wallis' public relations firm, Chamy Media, was being paid £24,000 by the Met for him to do public relations work two days each month, Wallis also received more than £25,000 from News International for providing “crime exclusives” using details of Met investigations. For one story, he was paid £10,000. His contract with the Met reportedly had a confidentiality clause, a Data Protection Act clause and a conflict of interest clause. During January 2011, Stephenson accepted a five-week stay worth an estimated $19,000 from Champneys, a health farm at the time the spa's public relations were being handled by Wallis's firm.

Three days later, on 17 July, Stephenson resigned. He claimed his relationship with Wallis was that of an acquaintance and maintained only for professional purposes. He denied having suspected Wallis was involved in phone hacking, relying upon senior figures from News International claiming misbehaviour was confined to a few rogues. Finally, he claimed to have been unaware of any other documents in the Met's possession of the nature that subsequently emerged."

The next day, 18 July, an initiative was announced by Home Secretary Theresa May to examine the ethical considerations regarding the relations between the Metropolitan police and the media. It was to be led by Elizabeth Filkin, the former Parliamentary Commissioner for Standards, and intended to create a framework for how officers should interact with journalists. May also noted that she had asked the Independent Police Complaints Commission to determine whether it needs the authority to question civilian witnesses during the course of their investigations and whether it should be able to investigate "institutional failings" of entire forces in addition to allegations against individual officers.

On 1 September 2011, Her Majesty's Inspectorate of Constabulary began an inquiry to address alleged corruption and abuse of power in police relationships with the media." This, too, was ordered by Home Secretary Theresa May and led by a former chief constable of Essex, Roger Baker. His area of investigation was to include payments made to custody sergeants for tip-offs about arrests as well as buying drinks and providing lavish hospitality.

Later in September, in what may also be considered an internal investigation, the new Met Commissioner, Bernard Hogan-Howe, took the unusual step of asking the Durham constabulary to review the work of Operation Weeting.

== Criticisms and responses ==
Investigations of the Met gave rise to criticisms of the Met's role in the phone hacking scandal. Commentators observed that the personal relationships among individuals variously in law enforcement, news media, and political institutions may have compromised principles and judgments, sometimes leading to inappropriate favors and even illegal payments. This entanglement of personal and commercial interests led some commentators to believe that a disincentive was created for police officials to thoroughly investigate allegations of wrongdoing. This may have resulted in the failure to notify victims in a timely manner, led to misleading statements to the public and government oversight bodies to cover-up wrongdoing, and/or led to attempts to stifle the voices of whistle-blowers.

Metropolitan Police spokespersons have maintained that investigations were pursued appropriately in light of information and guidance available to them and in light of competing priorities for their resources.

=== Personal relationships and potential conflicts of interest ===
While Commissioner of the Metropolitan Police from 1993 to 2000, Paul Condon established the Met's anti-corruption unit, acknowledging that police corruption was not an occasional threat, but a permanent, ongoing one. Condon's initiatives all but closed down communication between Met police and the news media.

Condon's successor, John Stevens was Met commissioner from 2000 to 2005. He was credited with reopening communication between the Met and the news media, consciously cultivating relationships with them. In this, he was assisted by the Met's public affairs head, Dick Fedorcio. One senior officer reportedly said that Stevens was a master of the media who had not understood the complications that could arise from close relationships with the media. After retiring, Stevens wrote a column for the News of the World. In his autobiography, he stated that he had worked hard to maintain good relations with the press and, in doing so had made himself "available" to editors such as Rebekah Brooks (then Wade) at The Sun and Andy Coulson at the News of the World.

Ian Blair was commissioner from February 2005 to December 2008. Apparently less skilled than Stevens in working with the media, Blair made high-profile media gaffes that contributed to his losing support and ultimately led to his resignation. Blair later wrote an article for the New Statesman in which he agreed with Condon that there would always be some small number of corrupt staff in the Met. Then in his role as journalist, the former commissioner held the view that only a small fraction of policemen became compromised and that the principal problem stemmed from their relationships with politicians rather than with journalists.

By the time Paul Stephenson became Met commissioner in January 2009, News Corporation executives had well established, interdependent relationships with both politicians and the police.

In the 15 months following his becoming prime minister, David Cameron met with News International executives 26 times. James Murdoch, Rebekah Brooks, and Andy Coulson had all been his guests at the Prime Minister's official country residence. According to The Independent, Mr Cameron held at least twice as many meetings with Murdoch executives as he held with any other media organisation. Leaders of both major parties cultivated relationships with the Murdochs.

Since 2006, Met commissioner Paul Stephenson dined with executives and others at News Corporation 18 times, including 8 times with Neil Wallis, one of which was in September 2006 during the Royal Household/Goodman inquiry when Wallis was deputy editor of News of the World. Andy Hayman who led that inquiry, attended several dinners, lunches and receptions with News of the World editors. One such dinner was on 25 April 2006 while his officers were gathering evidence in the cases. Shortly after Mr. Hayman left the Metropolitan Police in December 2007 he was hired to write a column for The Times of London, another publication of News International.

Home Secretary Theresa May, expressed concerns over the closeness of the relationship between News International and the police. Deputy Prime Minister Nick Clegg expressed concerns about growing public perception of police corruption. Labor MP Paul Farrelly said the meetings demonstrated inappropriate ties with the Murdoch organisation. The report of the Home Affairs Select Committee noted a "level of social interaction which took place between senior Metropolitan Police Officers and executives at News International while investigations were or should have been being undertaken into the allegations of phone hacking carried out on behalf of the News of the World."

Paul Stephenson resigned 17 July 2011. This was the result of speculation about the Met's ties to senior people at News International including Neil Wallis who had been arrested in connection with Operation Weeting."

There was potential for mutual benefit from these various relationships, some of which could be rationalized to be in the public interest. Personal ties could help journalists obtain information on which to base news stories the public should know about. The police might obtain information from journalists that helped solve crimes. In defense of investigative reporting by News of the World, The New York Times noted that even disregarding sex scandals, wrongdoing resulting in dozens of criminal convictions had been reported.

However, some mutual benefit from these personal ties was less focused on the public good. As early as 1997, it was customary for newspapers, including News of the World, about to publish a story about alleged criminal activity, to tip-off the police in advance so that the police could make arrests and get favorable publicity from the newspaper. Police officials might receive favors or even payment for information. Questionable aspects of their private life might also receive less scrutiny from the press. Politicians might receive influential support from newspapers. Every Prime Minister beginning with Margaret Thatcher reportedly benefited from News Corporation endorsement. Newspaper executives in return might receive preferred access to politicians that could help their companies. For example, News Corporation Chairman in Europe, James Murdoch dined at the Prime Minister's official country residence during the period that he was promoting the company's bid for British Sky Broadcasting Group (BSkyB).

In the worst case, such personal relationships could create a conflict of interest making senior Met officials less willing to act in the public interest. The Daily Beast concluded the current situation between the Met and News International was too cozy.

=== Limited, incomplete investigations ===
Critics of the Met's investigation into phone hacking noted that large amounts of evidence available to them was inexplicably left unevaluated and unused. It was speculated during a Parliamentary Debate in September 2010, that, if Andy Hayman, the Met officer who headed the phone hacking 2006 investigation, had been placed in charge of the Watergate inquiry, "President Nixon would have safely served a full term." Critics also noted the legal criteria the Met used to guide its investigations was incorrect, and that conflicts of interest may have contributed to limiting the investigations.

The Met responded that there were higher priority investigations competing for the limited resources available, and that they conducted appropriate investigations based upon their knowledge and guidance at the time. Responding to a critical New York Times article, the Metropolitan Police Service released a statement defending its actions.

Eventually, with increasing publicity regarding the phone hacking scandal, a total of 185 people were committed to investigations relating to illegal acquisition of confidential information. Specifically, by mid-July 2012, 96 officers and civilians were working on Operation Weeting (phone hacking), 19 officers working on Operation Tuleta (computer hacking), and 70 working on Operation Elveden (bribery, corruption).

Unevaluated evidence

The Met began accumulating evidence against Jonathan Rees beginning in 1987 relating to the murder of Daniel Morgan and other crimes. Nick Davies, reporter for The Guardian, believes these "boxloads" of paperwork "could include explosive new evidence of illegal news-gathering by the News of the World and other papers." There has been no indication that this evidence was thoroughly evaluated for evidence of illegal acquisition of confidential information.

Documents dating back to the 1990s seized in 2003 by the Information Commissioner's Office from the home of private investigator Stephen Whittamore as part of Operation Motorman may not have been thoroughly evaluated by the Met for evidence of illegal acquisition of confidential information. Seized documents included 13,343 requests for confidential information from 305 journalists In 2007 the information commissioner "berated the police and PCC over their feeble prosecution and condemnation, respectively, of a range of offences, from garnering ex-directory numbers to hacking into the police national computer."

Staff at News of the World reportedly reported to the police in 2002 that the paper only had access to Milly's voice mails and that no one had been accused of phone hacking at that time."

Documents seized by the Metropolitan Police in August 2006 from the home of private investigator Glenn Mulcaire totaled 11,000 pages of evidence, including a voicemail target list with over 4,000 names on it. According to The New York Times, no one at the Met cataloged this evidence until late 2010, even though senior Scotland Yard officials told Parliament, judges, lawyers, potential hacking victims, the news media and the public that there was no evidence of widespread hacking by the tabloid. According to The Daily Telegraph, evidence had been kept in trash bags for three years before deputy commissioner John Yates ] had the names entered on to a computer database to permit thorough examination for leads. Only eight of 4,000 potential victims became the subject of charges against Mulcaire in 2006.

A key document seized from Mulcaire's premises in August 2006 was the "Transcript for Nevile" email. The names appearing on this document indicated that News of the World journalists in addition to Clive Goodman were involved in phone hacking. The Met acknowledged the existence of this document 1 November 2007 in response to inquiries related to the civil claim brought against News of the World by Gordon Taylor. The court ordered the Met to turn the document over to Taylor on 7 December 2007 and Farrer and Co, which then represented News Group Newspapers, received a copy by 2 April 2008.

The chairman of Culture, Media and Sport Committee asked Yates why this document did not provoke someone to interview Neville. The committee criticized this 2006 decision not to investigate further, concluding that there had been evidence of additional lawbreaking by others and that more thorough police investigation had been warranted. The Committee criticized Yates judgment. The following year, the Home Affairs Select Committee conducted an inquiry and leveled similar criticism at the Met "for its failures to pursue inquiries."

Priorities

Faced with criticism for not thoroughly pursuing available evidence in 2006, the Met asserted that the Royal Household/Goodman inquiry was limited "because the counter-terrorism unit, which was in charge of the case, was preoccupied with more pressing demands." According to deputy assistant commissioner Peter Clark, the unit then had over 70 live operations regarding terrorist plots and that not all of these were being investigated because of a shortage of officers to do so. Assistant commissioner John Yates pointed to the fact that, two days after Mucaire was arrested, the counter-terrorism unit foiled an Al-Qaeda plan to blow up transatlantic airliners.

The Home Affairs Select Committee acknowledged that the anti-terrorist unit had conflicting priorities and that Clark gave higher priority to protecting life threatened by terrorists than to criminal activity resulting only in breaches of privacy. Nonetheless, it was critical of not looking into the evidence it had in hand.

Incorrect legal criteria

As part of setting their investigative priorities in 2006, the Met consulted with the Crown Prosecution Service (CPS) to agree upon a strategy for pursuing the Royal Household/Goodman inquiry. Assistant commissioner John Yates claimed that the Met was guided by advice from the CPS, then headed by Director of Public Prosecutions (DPP) Ken Macdonald, that "phone hacking was only an offence if messages had been intercepted before they were listened to by the intended recipient." Yates told Parliament on four separate occasions that it was on the basis of this legal theory that Yates repeatedly claimed that only 10 to 12 phone hacking victims had been identified. Yates maintained his position to the Culture, Media and Sport Committee in 2011 that the guidance received by the Met was "unequivocal."

This account was challenged by Keir Starmer, who succeed Macdonald as DPP. Starmer told the Home Affairs Select Committee that the Met were not given advice which limited their investigation. Specifically, he claimed:

- The Met had been advised that phone hacking was an offence under the 1990 Computer Misuse Act, regardless of whether messages had or had not been heard by their intended recipient.
- Although a CPS lawyer had raised the possibility early in the inquiry that, under the 2000 Regulation of Investigatory Powers Act (RIPA), it might be necessary to prove voicemail messages had been intercepted before listened to by the intended recipient, an email sent to the Met in April 2006 cautioned that this was an untested view that warranted further consideration. Furthermore, after David Perry became the prosecutor in July 2006, he advised the Met that this was a narrow interpretation.
- When charges were brought against Clive Goodman and Glenn Mulcaire, no mention was made as to whether messages had already been listened to by the intended recipient.

Conflict of interest

Some observers expressed the view that the decision to limit the investigation was in part due to conflict of interest by Met officials. According to The New York Times, some investigators acknowledged that Scotland Yard was reluctant investigate more fully in part because of its close relationship with News of the World." The New York Times further observed that, such interviews, combined with testimony before the Culture, Media and Sport Committee, indicated that “the police agency and News International … became so intertwined that they wound up sharing the goal of containing the investigation.

In reply, the Met insisted that they followed the lines of inquiry that they thought was likely to produce the best evidence, and that the charges that were brought were appropriate for the criminality uncovered. A former senior Met official denied the department was influenced by any alliance with News of the World.

Met assistant commissioner John Yates expressed his views to The Daily Telegraph in an interview that mistakes had been made, but that they reflected "cock-up, not conspiracy." The Met had simply taken a narrow view of what constituted a "victim," leading them to report publicly that there were a small number, a "handful," perhaps hundreds of victims, but not thousands.

=== Illegal payments to officers ===
Allegations of illegal payments to police officers date back to the earliest period of the phone hacking scandal. During the 1990s, Jonathan Rees reportedly had a network of sources within the Metropolitan Police Service, including serving officers, providing him with confidential information that he sold at a profit to news media organizations.

In March 2003, Rebekah Brooks, editor of The Sun, and Andy Coulson, editor of News of the World testified together before the Commons media select committee. Brooks responded to a question about payments to the police saying that the organization paid the police for information in the past. Asked if she would do so again in the future, her answer was pre-empted by Coulson who stated that, if there is a clear public interest, they would continue with that practice. It was pointed out to Coulson that it was always illegal to pay police officers, regardless of public interest. Coulson suggested he had been talking about the use of subterfuge."

According to The Guardian, the Met received documents in June 2011 from News International indicating that News of the World paid a total of £100,000 to between 3 and 5 as yet unidentified Met officers in 2003 while Coulson was editor. Former Met commissioner Ian Blair noted that this represents only "five junior police officers out of the Met's 52,000 staff." The Guardian believes evidence in the hands of the Met indicates there are more serving officers receiving thousands of pounds in brown envelopes from newspaper's crime reporters and that, when the attempts were made to stop the corruption, serving officers tipped them off so they could evade detection. The New York Times reported that, at best, the police have been lazy, incompetent and too cozy with the people they should have regarded as suspects. At worst, some officers might be committing crimes themselves."

In addition to cash payments, there is concern that Met officers may be influenced by favors or promises of employment, since senior Met officers sometimes land jobs with newspapers. The report of the Home Affairs Select Committee concluded that they were seriously concerned about allocations of payments made to serving police officers.

=== Victims not notified or information not released to them ===
As of June 2011, according to The Guardian, Scotland Yard is believed to still have hundreds of thousands of documents obtained during investigations into private investigator Jonathan Rees. Nick Davies, reporter for The Guardian, believes review of these "boxloads" of paperwork could expose explosive new evidence of illegal news-gathering by the News of the World and other news organizations. According to his sources, confidential information sold to newspapers may have been obtained through blagging, burglaries, bribery, and blackmail, sometimes involving corrupt customs officers, VAT inspectors, bank employees and police officers. In 2003, a raid by the Information Commissioner's Office (ICO) was made as part of Operation Motorman on the home of private investigator Steve Whittamore. This resulted in seizure of records including more than 13,000 requests for confidential information from newspapers and magazines.

In 2006, Information Commissioner Richard Thomas stated that hundreds of journalists may have illegally bought private information. In 2006, the Metropolitan Police Service (Scotland Yard) seized records from another private investigator, Glenn Mulcaire, and found a target list with over 4,000 names on it. Release of "the totality of the Mulcaire information" has not yet been achieved but has been requested through the courts. According to The Guardian, that seized material included 4,332 names or partial names, 2,987 mobile phone numbers. 30 audiotapes, and 91 pin codes for accessing voicemail.

There is no indication of a systematic effort by the Met to identify or notify the thousands of potential victims whose names were obtained during the taping of Rees's phone in 1999 or the raid on Whittamore's premises in 2003. After the raid on Glenn Mulcaire's premises in 2006, the Met reportedly alerted the royal household and five other victims who would be included on the formal indictment of Mulcaire. The Met also claimed they notified "select individuals with national-security concerns: members of the government, the police and the military."

The precise number of phone hacking victims is unknown, but a Commons Home Affairs Select Committee report noted in July 2011 that "as many as 12,800 people may have been victims or affected by phone hacking." It was estimated in July 2011 that only 170 of these victims had been informed. In October 2011, it was estimated that only 5%, or about 200, of people whose confidential information had been acquired by Mulcaire had been notified.

In contrast, John Yates told the House of Commons Culture, Media and Sport Committee in September 2009 that the police had only found evidence indicating that "it is very few, it is a handful" of persons that had been subject to message interception. Further, Mr. Yates assured the public that all those affected had been notified. For this, Yates was criticised by John Whittingdale, chairman of the Commons Culture, Media and Sport Committee. As late as February 2010, the Met continued refusing to report how many victims it had warned that their voicemail may have been hacked.

The first solicitors to win financial settlements for their clients for phone hacking had to deal with the Met as an obstacle rather than a resource. In some cases, the Met's failure to notify potential victims in a timely manner resulted in their having to pay their own solicitors to simply find out whether they had been victims of phone hacking crimes. George Galloway, a member of Parliament, was alerted by a detective that his messages had been hacked in August 2006. Galloway said the detective urged him to change his PIN code. But when Galloway asked who had accessed his phone, the man from Scotland Yard “refused to tell me anything." In most cases, the failure to notify delayed or even precluded legal action by victims against perpetrators. Some possible hacking victims said that by sitting on the evidence for so long, the police have made it impossible to get information from phone companies. Not only were potential victims denied the opportunity to check the call data, which the phone companies only keep for 12 months, they also did not become aware of the desirability of changing their access codes or of considering what damage might have been done to them as a result of interception.

Only after The Guardian's article of July 2009 making public the details of the settlement News of the World made with Max Clifford was there a broad initiative by solicitors and barristers to force disclosure of phone hacking evidence held by the Met since at least August 2006." Two dozen people brought civil cases against News International, that forced the Met to release information relating to Mr. Mulcaire. Even then, obtaining useful information from the Met was not easy for victims. A woman who believed her phone had been hacked because details about her life appeared in News of the World wrote to the police for information. Two months later, she received a reply confirming that her number had been found among the documents seized from Mulcaire and suggested she contact her phone-service provider.

In summary, according to The New York Times Scotland Yard chose to notify only a fraction of the victims of phone hacking. This had effectively shielded News of the World from many civil lawsuits.

In the case of four people, including former deputy prime minister John Prescott and former senior police official Brian Paddick, lawyers for the Met told the court phones of the four had not been hacked. It turned out that they had, leading their attorney to accuse the Met of misleading the court. Outraged, Prescott filed suit against the Met because police initially declined to hand over details about him taken from the office of Glenn Mulcaire.

=== Misled prosecutors, courts, Parliament, and the public ===
Senior Police officials, both in the Met, City, and other territorial forces have been accused of misleading victims, the public, Parliament, prosecutors, and courts.

The public was not generally aware of the narrow interpretation used by the Met of what constituted illegal phone hacking, i.e., it was only considered illegal if the hacker heard the message before the intended victim. Consequently, the Met's indicating there were just a "handful" of victims misled victims, the public, and Parliament regarding how widespread the practice was of intercepting confidential communications, regardless of when the intended recipient heard them. Scotland Yard originally claimed there were only eight victims. As late at mid-2009, John Yates claimed there were "hundreds, not thousands" of potential victims.

This same narrow interpretation was used by the Met when it assured everyone that all affected individuals had been notified by claiming the police had taken all appropriate action to ensure that people were informed where ever there was evidence of their being subject of any form of phone tapping. In September 2010, Yates told the Home Affairs Select Committee that all reasonable steps had been taken with the major telephone service providers to ensure victims were notified "where we had even the minutest possibility they may have been the subject of an attempt to hack or hacking." According to Yates, this included speaking to the potential victims directly or ensuring that a phone company had done so. The four leading mobile phone companies denied that the police asked them to warn any victims.

Met officials may have made misleading statements when they gave assurances that no evidence of widespread hacking had been found even though they had not thoroughly searched for it.

The Crown Prosecution Service (CPS) claimed it was misled by the Met during consultations on how broadly to investigate during the Royal Household/Goodman inquiry. Met officials reportedly didn't discuss certain evidence with senior prosecutors, who were later stunned to discover evidence had not been shared. A Met spokesman responded that CPP had access to all the evidence.

In its report, the Home Affairs Select Committee did not expressly accuse Mr. Hayman of lying to them but did say that it was difficult to escape the suspicion that he deliberately mislead them. Member of Parliament Chris Bryant directly accused assistant commissioner Yates of misleading two parliamentary committees and of failing to correct himself to Parliament after errors in testimony became apparent to him. Yates responded to accusations by The Guardian by hiring a well known libel firm to threaten legal action against various media outlets for reporting he had misled parliament." Yates legal fees were reportedly paid by the Met.

=== Discouraging whistleblowers ===
During parliamentary debate in July 2011, Baroness Berridge observed that more, not fewer, whistleblowers were needed since whistleblowers speak out in the public interest. This is not the same as leaking information.

In September 2011, as the Met conducted its three newly initiated investigations of illegal acquisition of confidential information, it pursued ongoing leaks from the Met concerning evidence it held as well as earlier leaks that gave rise to the various investigations. In an apparent effort to discourage future leaks, the Met took the unusual action of invoking the Official Secrets Act, which provides for severe penalties. Specifically, the Met used the Act to call for the journalists at The Guardian to reveal their sources for information upon which the Milly Dowler revelations were based. This action was immediately and widely condemned as an attempt to discourage whistleblowers and intimidate the media. The Guardian reported it had received papers demanding that reporters hand over anything that could lead the police to whistleblower for the Dowler story.

The Met's action was criticized by chairman Keith Vaz of the Home Affairs Select Committee and chairman John Whittingdale of the Culture, Media and Sport Committee. A representative on freedom of the media for the Organization for Security and Co-operation in Europe, Office for Democratic Institutions and Human Rights, wrote to foreign secretary, William Hague expressing concern over the potentially chilling effects on investigative reporting and press freedom."

The Met initially sought to clarify its use of the Official Secrets Act but soon retreated from this initiative and withdrew its demand.

== Timeline ==
- 1987 – Daniel Morgan is murdered.
- April to September 1999 – MPS gathers evidence from tap on phone of Jonathan Rees as part of Operation Nigeria.
- September 1999 – MPS raids Jonathan Rees' premises, seizing a large cache of documents.
- Autumn, 2001 – Glenn Mulcaire is given a full-time contract to do work for News of the World.
- March 2002 – Milly Dowler's phone is hacked by agents of News of the World
- November 2002 – Information Commissioner's Office (ICO) raids John Boyall's premises seizing many documents.
- March 2003 – ICO raids Steve Whittamore's premises as part of Operation Motorman, seizing a large cache of documents.
- February 2004 – Whittamore, Boyall, King, and Marshall are arrested and charged with crimes as a result of Metropolitan Police Service investigations under Operation Glade.
- April 2005 – Whittamore, Boyall, King, and Marshall plead guilty to charges related to illegal acquisition of confidential information.
- 29 June 2005 – Ross Hall (aka Ross Hindley), journalist at News of the World, sends an email to Glenn Mulcaire titled "Transcript for Neville."
- November 2005 – Senior aides to Britain's royal family notice irregularities with their telephone voicemail messages. The Metropolitan Police Service is notified.
- 2006? – John Gunning is convicted of acquiring private subscriber information from British Telecom's database.
- August 2006 – The Metropolitan Police Service raids Glenn Mulcaire's premises seizing a large cache of documents, including the "Transcript for Neville".
- August 2006 – Goodman and Mulcaire are arrested.
- Early autumn 2006 – Rebekah Brooks is advised by "a senior police officer" that substantial "circumstantial evidence" exists in documents seized from the home of Glenn Mulcaire that News of the World journalists in addition to Clive Goodman were implicated in phone hacking. This information reportedly reached several other executives, including News International legal manager Tom Crone and News of the World editor Andy Coulson.
- 29 November 2006 – Goodman and Mulcaire plead guilty to conspiracy to intercept communications without lawful authority.
- January 2007 – Goodman and Mulcaire are sentenced.
- 27 June 2008 – The court orders documents held by the Met obtained on the raids on Mulciare and Steve Whittamore be turned over to Mark Lewis, solicitor for Gorden Taylor. These documents include the "Transcript for Neville."
- 2008 – News International executives continue to maintain to Parliament that they "had no significant evidence until 2008 that illegal voicemail interception involved more journalists than News of the World's Clive Goodman.
- 8 July 2009 – The Guardian publishes articles reporting the News of the World's large settlement with Gordon Taylor and alleging it was intended to keep secret the misstatements made by newspaper executives regarding involvement of more than one journalist.
- 9 July 2009 – After a cursory one day review, assistant commissioner police John Yates decides not to reopen the 2006 investigation into phone hacking.
- July 2009 – The Commons Culture, Media and Sport Committee holds additional hearings.
- 1 September 2010 – An article published by The New York Times alleges the Met "failed to pursue leads" that indicated News of the World routinely used phone hacking to get leads for stories, and that the Met "was reluctant to conduct a wider inquiry in part because of its close relationship with News of the World."
- 2 September 2009 – Metropolitan Police Service acting deputy commissioner John Yates testifies before the House of Commons Culture, Media and Sport Committee that there is "insufficient grounds or evidence to arrest or interview anyone else and...no additional evidence has come to light."
- February 2010 – The Commons Culture, Media and Sport Committee releases findings for most recent hearings that are critical of the Metropolitan Police and News International executives.
- February 2010 – Justice Geoffrey Vos orders Mulcaire to name journalists for whom he worked when intercepting Max Clifford's voicemail, including those whose names had been redacted from Mulcaire documents by the Metropolitan Police Service.
- 15 December 2010 – An article published by The Guardian alleges documents seized from Glenn Mulcaire by Metropolitan Police Service in 2006 implied that News of the World editor Ian Edmondson specifically instructed Mulcaire to intercept voice messages of Sienna Miller, Jude Law, and several others. The documents also implied that Mulcaire was engaged by others at News of the World, including chief reporter Neville Thurlbeck and assistant editor Greg Miskiw, who had then worked directly for editor Andy Coulson. This contradicted testimony to the Culture, Media and Sport Committee by newspaper executives and senior Met officials that Mulcaire acted on his own and that there was no evidence of hacking by other than him and a single "rogue reporter," namely Clive Goodman.
- 26 January 2011 – Operation Weeting led by deputy assistant commissioner Sue Akers is launched to investigate phone hacking.
- Early 2011 – News International executives continue to insist that phone hacking "was limited to one 'rogue reporter,' Clive Goodman, who was jailed on hacking-related charges in 2007."
- 5 April 2011 – First arrests are made since 2006 in conjunction with illegal acquisition of confidential information. Arrested were Neville Thurlbeck, Ian Edmondson, and James Weatherup, all editors or journalists for News of the World.
- 10 June 2011 – Operation Tuleta, also led by Sue Akers, is launched to investigate computer hacking.
- 20 June 2011 – Ken Macdonald gave papers relating to allegations of illegal payments to the Metropolitan police.
- 6 July 2011 – Operation Elveden, also led by Sue Akers, is launched to investigate police bribery and corruption.
- 17 July 2011 – Metropolitan Police Service commissioner Paul Stephenson resigns.
- 18 July 2011 – Assistant commissioner John Yates resigns.
- 19 July 2011 – The Commons Culture, Media and Sport Committee begins follow-up to the 2009 inquiry into press standards, privacy and libel, including phone hacking.
- 15 September 2011 – The new Met Commissioner, Bernard Hogan-Howe, brings in a team from an outside police force, the Durham constabulary headed by Jon Stoddart, to review the work of Operation Weeting.
- 22 September 2011 – An article published by The Independent alleges that, within weeks of the arrests of Clive Goodman and Glenn Mulcaire in August 2006, "a senior police officer" advised Rebekah Brooks there was substantial "circumstantial evidence" in the documents seized from Mulcaire that News of the World journalists in addition to Goodman were implicated in phone hacking. It also reported that in early autumn 2006, Tom Crone, legal manager for News International, contacted several other executives, including then News of the World editor Andy Coulson, informing them of what the Met told Brooks.
- 15 May 2012 – The Crown Prosecution Service (CPS) charges six individuals, including former News International CEO Rebekah Brooks, her husband, her personal assistant, her bodyguard, her chauffeur, and the head of security at News International, with conspiring to pervert the course of justice by removing documents and computers to prevent them from falling into the hands of the Met.
- 24 July 2012 – Charges are brought against eight former employees or agents of News of the World including head editors Rebekah Brooks and Andy Coulson. All eight were charged regarding illegal interception of communications relating to specific individuals

== See also ==
- News media phone hacking scandal
- Phone hacking scandal reference lists
- News International phone hacking scandal
- Metropolitan Police Service
- Operation Motorman (ICO investigation)
- Operation Glade
- Operation Weeting
- Operation Tuleta
- Operation Elveden
- Leveson Inquiry
