= The Hack =

British Television series

- Genre: True crime drama
- Written by: Jack Thorne; Annalisa Dinnella
- Directed by: Lewis Arnold
- Starring: David Tennant; Toby Jones; Robert Carlyle; Tamla Kari
- Music by: Lorne Balfe; Joshua Pacey
- Country of origin: United Kingdom
- Original language: English
- No. of series: 1
- No. of episodes: 7

Production
- Executive producers: Jack Thorne; Joe Williams; Lewis Arnold; David Tennant; Patrick Spence; Tamla Kari
- Producer: Abi Bach
- Running time: 47 minutes
- Production companies: ITV Studios; AC Chapter One; One Shoe Films

Original release
- Network: ITVX; Stan
- Release: 24 September – 5 November 2025

The Hack is a British true-crime television series detailing the News International phone hacking scandal. It stars an ensemble cast led by David Tennant, Toby Jones and Robert Carlyle with Steve Pemberton, Eve Myles, Dougray Scott, Lisa McGrillis and Adrian Lester, amongst others.

== Premise ==
Set between 2002 and 2012, the series examines two intersecting real-life stories, the work of Nick Davies, a journalist who uncovered evidence of phone hacking at the News of the World, a now-defunct British newspaper owned by Rupert Murdoch; and the police investigation into the unsolved 1987 murder of Daniel Morgan, a private investigator with links to the News of the World.

== Cast ==
The cast includes:

- David Tennant as Nick Davies
- Toby Jones as Alan Rusbridger
- Robert Carlyle as DCS Dave Cook
- Steve Pemberton as Rupert Murdoch
- Cara Theobold as Amelia Hill, a reporter for The Guardian
- Rose Leslie as Charlotte Harris, a lawyer
- Rosalie Craig as Rebekah Brooks
- Dougray Scott as Gordon Brown
- Eve Myles as Jacqui Hames
- Adrian Lester as "Mr Apollo", Davies's pseudonymous source
- Katherine Kelly as Sheridan McCoid
- Kevin Doyle as Assistant Commissioner John Yates
- Neil Maskell as Glen Campbell, of Panorama
- Lara Pulver as Jo Becker
- Lee Ingleby as David Leigh
- Pip Torrens as Stuart Kuttner
- Lisa McGrillis as Sarah Montague
- Sean Pertwee as Sean Hoare
- Robert Bathurst as Max Clifford
- Terence Maynard as Rufus Duffy, of The Guardian
- Richard Pepple as DI Graham Twyler
- Phil Davis as Alastair Morgan, brother of Daniel
- Ace Bhatti as Rahul Shah
- Ricci Harnett as Garry Vian
- Jay Simpson as Glenn Vian
- Charlie Brooks as Kim Vian
- Lucy Speed as Molly Vian
- Georgia Jay as Sienna Miller
- Nicholas Rowe as Jeremy Paxman
- Mark Stobbart as Andy Coulson
- Robert Glenister as DCI Callum Lockhart
- Lisa Dillon as Clare Rewcastle Brown
- Joseph May as Don Van Natta
- Alec Newman as John Mullin
- Oliver Milburn as Nick Ross
- Steven Waddington as Mike Sullivan, of The Sun
- Nigel Lindsay as Jules Stenson, features editor of The News of the World
- Elisabeth Hopper as Caroline Davies, Nick Davies's ex-wife
- Andrew Whipp as Jonathan Rees
- Paul Kaye as Gary Eaton, a witness to the murder
- Patrick Baladi as John Whittingdale
- Sophie Bould as Jean Davies, mother of Nick
- Rebecca Front as Deputy Assistant Commissioner Sue Akers
- Lucy Russell as Tessa Jowell
- Silas Carson as Sam Eldwick
- Daniel Ryan as Tom Watson MP
- George Russo as Glenn Mulcaire
- Cal MacAninch as Tommy Sheridan
- Ron Cook as Max Mosley
- Roger Ringrose as Justice Maddison
- Lucy Black as Sally Dowler, mother of Milly Dowler
- Colin R. Campbell as Bob Dowler, father of Milly

The opening episode also includes brief, non-speaking cameos from Harry Hill, Konnie Huq, Gabby Logan and Jonathan Ross.

Episode 3 features a cameo from Alastair Campbell (Tony Blair's strategist and advisor) as himself.

== Production ==
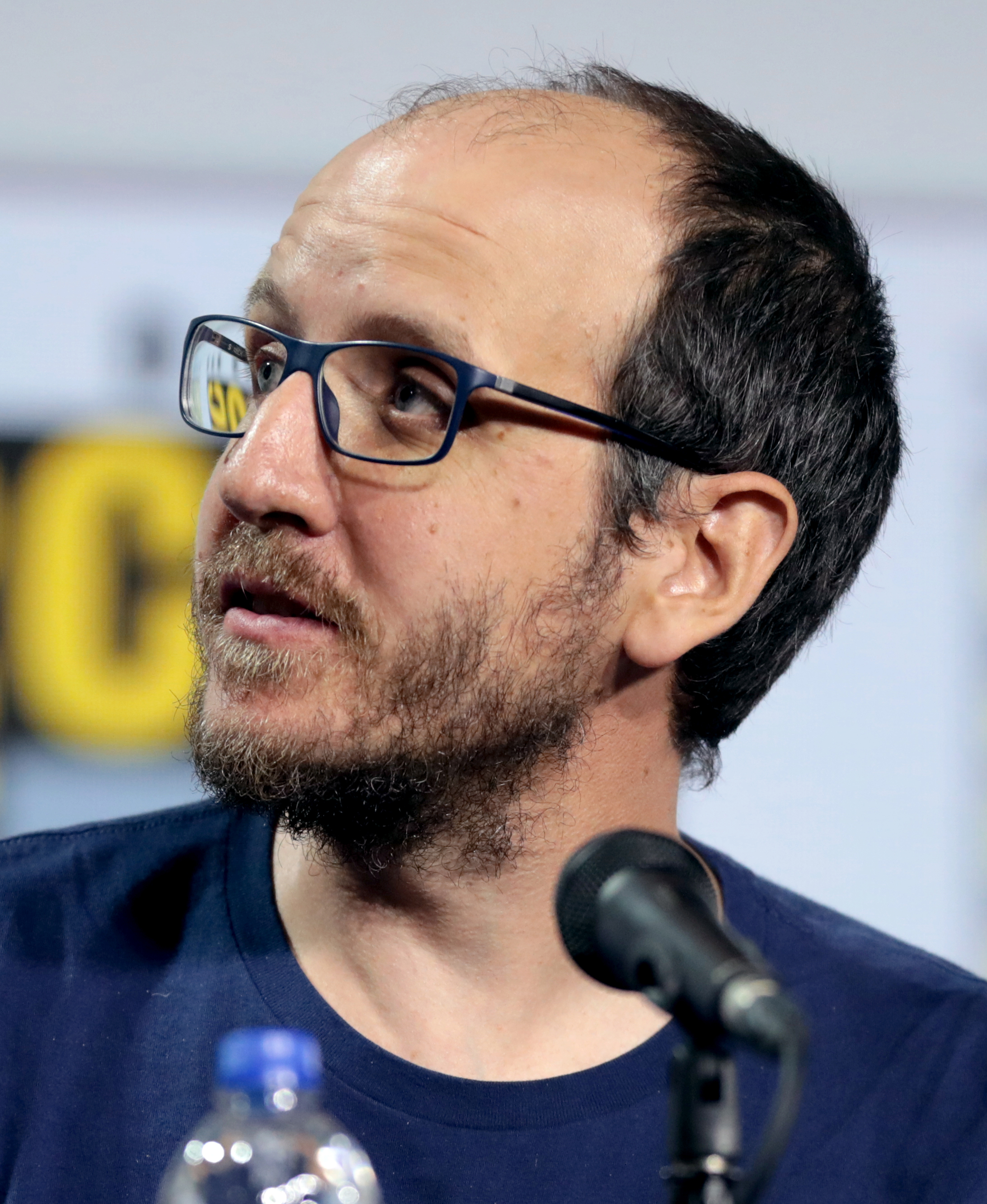
Writer Jack Thorne, seen in 2019

The seven-part series was commissioned by ITVX and Australian streamer Stan. It is written by BAFTA-winning screenwriter Jack Thorne and Annalisa Dinnella. It is directed by Lewis Arnold. The series is produced by ITV Studios with AC Chapter One and One Shoe Films. Executive producers include Patrick Spence and Jack Thorne alongside Joe Williams for ITV Studios, Lewis Arnold and David Tennant. Abi Bach is the series producer.

Initially reported under the working title Mandrake, filming locations included Hemel Hempstead, Muswell Hill and Kilburn, London in February and March 2024.

== Broadcast ==
All seven parts were released on ITVX on 24 September 2025. ITV and STV began linear broadcasts on the same date. In India, it was also streaming on Lionsgate Play from 7 November 2025.

== Reception ==
The review aggregator website Rotten Tomatoes reported an 71% approval rating based on 11 critic reviews.

Julia Raeside writing in the i Paper gave the series five stars out of five, adding:

The Hack is a complicated story, brilliantly told by a group of creatives at the very peak of their powers and Thorne manages to weave the many strands into a galloping narrative spiked with wit and bold emotional flourishes. The press and politicians will no doubt be watching the audience reaction to The Hack closely. Whatever the outcome, it is TV dynamite.

Vicky Jessop in the Evening Standard gave the series four stars out of five, calling it a "welcome refresher on one of the biggest abuses of power of our time". Paul Hirons writing for the Killing Times also gave it four stars and called the series "surprising, stylish, and brilliantly mounted". Lucy Mangan, writing in The Guardian, gave the show two out of five, criticising the "many breakings of the fourth wall by Tennant [that] only undermines any sense that the writer trusts his story". Nick Hilton in The Independent gave three out of five, and noted:

As well as its headliners, The Hack makes use of some top UK talent in its panoply of real-life characters ... The willingness of these actors (the named cast runs for seven pages on the press release) to take small parts in an ensemble speaks to the impact phone-hacking had on showbusiness culture.
