= Operation Motorman (ICO investigation) =

Operation Motorman was a 2003 investigation by the Information Commissioner's Office into allegations of offences under the Data Protection Act by the British press.

The ICO first became aware of the scale of the problem in November 2002, when an ICO investigator attended a search under warrant of John Boyall, a private investigator in Surrey. Documents found on the premises revealed the misuse of data from the Police National Computer. This discovery led to two investigations: Operation Motorman, conducted by the ICO and led by ICO Senior Investigator Alec Owens, who prior to joining the ICO had been a Merseyside Police Inspector; and Operation Glade, conducted by the Metropolitan Police.

The ICO later obtained search warrants for the Hampshire office of a private detective Steve Whittamore. A huge cache of documents revealed, in precise detail, a network of police and public employees illegally selling personal information obtained from government computer systems. The personal information that Whittamore obtained from his network was passed on to journalists working for various newspapers, including the News of the World, the Sunday Times, the Observer, the Daily Mail and the Daily Mirror. At least 305 different reporters have been identified as customers of the network.

In February 2004, four suspects pleaded guilty to conspiring to commit misconduct in public office: Whittamore and Boyall, retired police officer Alan King, and Paul Marshall, a police communications officer. The four were given conditional discharges. Other members of Whittamore's network were due to stand trial but the case collapsed.

In September 2011, former policeman Alec Owens, the original lead investigator of Operation Motorman, criticised the senior management of the ICO for the way in which the investigation was handled. He stated that investigators were prohibited from interviewing journalists and alleged that this was because the management "were frightened". He said that had the team been allowed to question journalists the use of phone hacking might have been uncovered earlier. In November 2011, just a few days before Owens was due to give evidence to the Leveson Inquiry, his home was raided under warrant by Cheshire Police. Before leaving under police caution for an interview at Wilmslow police station, Owens informed Lord Leveson by phone of the raid.

On 9 April 2012, right-wing political blogger Paul Staines published information on over 1,000 News International requests to Whittamore from the Operation Motorman files. The day before the files were released The Guardians' "Media Monkey" column had reported rumours that Staines was going to release the files, and was preparing to fly to Ireland to escape the jurisdiction of the English courts.

== See also ==
- Leveson Inquiry
- Metropolitan police role in phone hacking scandal#Operation Glade (2003)
- News International phone hacking scandal#Information Commissioner's report
- News media phone hacking scandal#Early investigations (1990s–2005)
- Operation Elveden
- Operation Glade
- Operation Rubicon
- Operation Tuleta
- Operation Weeting
- Phone hacking scandal reference lists
