= John Yates (police officer) =

British Assistant Commissioner

John Yates QPM (born 17 February 1959) is a former Assistant Commissioner in the London Metropolitan Police Service (2006–2011). As leader of the Metropolitan Police Service (MPS)'s Special Inquiry Squad (often called the "Celebrity Squad"), Yates was dubbed "Yates of the Yard" by the British press following his involvement in a number of cases with high media profiles. Yates came to particular prominence for heading the Cash for Honours investigation. Yates also coordinated the UK police response to the 2004 Indian Ocean earthquake and tsunami, heading "Operation Bracknell", for which he was awarded the Queen's Police Medal in January 2006. He resigned in July 2011 over criticism of a July 2009 review he carried out of the 2006 police investigation of the News of the World royal phone hacking scandal. Following his resignation, he was employed by the government of Bahrain as an adviser on the reform of its security forces.

== Background ==
Yates was born in Liverpool "to a family of doctors". Yates was educated at Marlborough College, and went on to study at King's College London (BA Hons Medieval and Modern History, 1981) and Fitzwilliam College, Cambridge (Dip. Applied Criminol.).

== Career ==
Yates joined the Metropolitan Police in 1981. He served as a senior detective in North and West London and was the senior investigating officer on over 20 murders. He led 'Operation Russia', an inquiry into corruption in a regional crime squad in East Dulwich, which led to the imprisonment of six serving detectives for sentences totalling 46 years.

He has served on the Association of Chief Police Officers committee on rape.

As leader of the MPS's Special Inquiry Squad (often called the "Celebrity Squad"), Yates was dubbed "Yates of the Yard" by the British press following his involvement in a number of cases with high media profiles. He headed the investigation of Lord Archer for perjury, the fraud investigation involving TV game show Who Wants To Be a Millionaire? and the bringing of rape charges against John Leslie." He also handled the police investigation which led to the failed trial of Paul Burrell for stealing; the trial collapsed with the Burrell affair.

Yates was appointed Deputy Assistant Commissioner in January 2004. In that role, he was Director of Serious and Organised Crime in the MPS, with responsibility for homicide, child protection, tackling organised criminal networks, gun crime and covert policing. Yates coordinated the UK police response to the 2004 Indian Ocean earthquake and tsunami, heading "Operation Bracknell" for which he was awarded the Queen's Police Medal in January 2006. As part of that work, Yates visited the devastated areas, and dealt with diplomats and the bereaved. Yates was also the Met Police's senior officer who travelled to Brazil to meet the family of Jean Charles de Menezes, who had been shot dead after being mistaken for a terrorist in the immediate aftermath of the London Bombings in July 2005.

=== Assistant Commissioner (2006–2011) ===
Yates' promotion to Assistant Commissioner was confirmed by the Metropolitan Police Authority on 18 December 2006; he had previously held the position on a temporary basis. A press release issued by the Metropolitan Police Authority stated that Yates would be a member of the MPS management board: "John Yates will help formulate the strategic direction of the largest police service in the country and will manage a major business area".

In March 2009, Yates was assigned to investigate allegations of torture made against UK anti-terrorism officials and on 9 April 2009, it was announced that he would replace Bob Quick as head of Specialist Operations.

=== Cash for peerages inquiry ===
As Deputy Assistant Commissioner, then acting Assistant Commissioner, Yates headed the team of detectives investigating the allegations that life peerages were awarded in return for loans, and it was a member of his team who interviewed the then Prime Minister, Tony Blair in December 2006. Yates's team handed its main file on the cash for peerages inquiry to the Crown Prosecution Service on Friday 20 April 2007. On 20 July 2007, the CPS announced that no charges would be brought as a result of the investigation for lack of direct evidence of an agreement that would have violated the law forbidding the sale of honours.

=== Phone hacking scandal ===
In mid-2009, Yates conducted a review of the 2006 Police inquiry into the News of the World royal phone hacking scandal, which had led to the imprisonment of two men in January 2007. In light of the new allegations in The Guardian, in July 2009 the Metropolitan Police commissioner Sir Paul Stephenson asked Assistant Commissioner Yates to review the original investigation for new evidence. In one 8-hour meeting, Yates reviewed the investigation but did not take any further action. In a later public statement, and in a July 2009 appearance at the Home Affairs Select Committee, he announced of the initial investigation that he "found it to be satisfactory". Yates then passed his findings back to the Commissioner and agreed with lawyers and the head of the Crown Prosecution Service Keir Starmer that no further action need be taken, and the case was not reopened. Yates' review did not include examination of possible leads from the thousands of pages of the available evidence seized in raids between 1999 and 2006. On 9 July 2009, Yates issued a statement. In September 2009, Yates reported his conclusions to the Commons Culture, Media and Sport Committee saying, "There remain now insufficient grounds or evidence to arrest or interview anyone else and... no additional evidence has come to light."

In 2011, dramatic developments in the scandal led to the closure of the News of the World newspaper, Yates faced allegations of wrongdoing, including from MP Chris Bryant, who called for his resignation saying "a very dirty smell" surrounded the police's conduct in the matter. The main accusations relate to having misled Parliament, having repeatedly reported that there was evidence of only around 10–12 cases, but it later emerged that police had evidence of "a vast number" of victims. Yates later said that he believed that he should refer only to cases where voicemail messages had been shown to have been intercepted prior to them being heard by the intended recipient. He also claimed to have ensured that four major mobile phone companies had informed around 120 people that their messages had been hacked, a claim disputed by the companies involved, two of which wrote to Scotland Yard stating that it was incorrect. Other criticisms related to failures to inform individuals that there was evidence their phone had been hacked, the perceived lack of thoroughness of the investigation and failure to take adequate action against officers who were known to have illegally accepted bribes.

In an interview with The Sunday Telegraph published on 9 July 2011, Yates expressed "extreme regret" for the failings in the initial phone hacking inquiry but dismissed any suggestion of corruption or improper relationships on his part. On 18 July 2011, Yates announced his resignation from the Metropolitan Police. The Met said of his resignation, "Assistant Commissioner John Yates has this afternoon indicated his intention to resign to the chair of the Metropolitan Police Authority. His resignation was accepted".

In May 2012, a report into phone hacking by a House of Commons select committee found that Yates, along with director of public prosecutions Keir Starmer, was culpable for failing to properly investigate evidence when hacking was first brought to his attention in 2006–2007. The report concluded, "The police at that time had no interest or willingness to uncover the full extent of the phone-hacking which had taken place". Since Yates's resignation and the reopening of police investigations in 2011, 90 people have been arrested and 16 have been formally charged with crimes.

Yates was the subject of very serious criticism by Lord Justice Leveson in his report:

In reality, Mr Yates failed adequately to address any question other than whether there was anything in the newspaper reports that constituted "new evidence". This was notwithstanding the fact that a vast amount of documentation available from the August 2006 seizures had not been fully analysed by the MPS itself; very little of it had been considered (let alone reviewed) by the CPS, save only for the very limited exercise of disclosure of unused material. [page 417, Volume 1, Leveson Report]

There was a mischaracterisation of the evidence which had been provisionally reviewed in August/September 2006 as amounting to "no evidence" either of other criminal offences or as implicating other potential defendants or, alternatively, if it was thought that there was evidence but only insufficient to prosecute, to consider whether, in the light of the Guardian’s article, that approach continued to be correct. [page 418, Volume 1, Leveson Report]

Lord Justice Leveson described his approach from the outset as "inappropriately dismissive, defensive and closed-minded (p. 418, vol. 1, Leveson Report).

Actor Kevin Doyle portrayed Yates in the ITV dramatised enactment of the phone hacking scandal and an unsolved 1987 murder in the seven-part series The Hack, first broadcast in 2025.

== Libel case ==
In 2012, Yates sued his former employer the Metropolitan Police and Bernard Hogan-Howe for distribution of a memorandum containing false and defamatory allegations. Lawyers Carter-Ruck reported that Yates was successful in his action and the defendants paid his legal fees and donated an undisclosed sum to a police charity of his choice.

== Adviser to Bahrain ==
After findings that the security forces of Bahrain used excessive force, torture and summary justice to crush a popular protest movement, Yates was appointed to oversee reform of the police force.

Subsequent to his appointment, Human Rights Watch criticised Bahrain's authorities for failing to adopt "critical recommendations" made by an independent commission that looked into extensive human rights violations during the crackdown on pro-democracy protesters in 2011. Joe Stork, deputy Middle East director at Human Rights Watch, said Bahrain's authorities had failed to investigate the involvement of high-ranking officials in "rampant torture or unlawful killings".

In an interview with The Daily Telegraph Yates said kettling "would work really well around here" in the face of "wanton damage" and "vandalism".

Prior to the 2012 Bahrain Grand Prix, Yates condemned what he said were "criminals" attacking unarmed police. He told Channel 4 News, "Bahrain is a place, a beautiful place. But there are some problems in some of the villages. There are some daily skirmishes, very dangerous skirmishes between what can only be described as criminals who are throwing petrol bombs at police and otherwise attacking the police.... What we see in the villages is nothing like peaceful protest. These are attacks on police officers, unarmed police officers".

Yates claimed that reporting of events presented a "distorted picture" and that he felt "completely safe. Indeed, safer than I have often felt in London".

The day after his comments, a child was admitted to intensive care after being shot in the chest by anti-riot police firing live ammunition and tear gas during a funeral procession for an activist killed the previous month.

Strong criticism has been directed at Yates for comments he has made on policing in Bahrain. New Statesman senior editor Mehdi Hasan branded the former Met chief a "disgrace", and Bahrani pro-democracy activist Ali Mushaima called for Yates to leave the country: "John Yates is not welcome in Bahrain". Despite a man being beaten to death by police on the eve of the Grand Prix and the arrests of Japanese and Western journalists (their Bahraini associates were also badly beaten), the day after the race, Yates had an article in The Daily Telegraph in which he claimed that Bahrain was "bewildered by the world's hostility" and said the country "is not Syria". He added, "The abiding image I have of the Grand Prix last weekend was of thousands of people enjoying themselves at the post‑event parties".

A week later, Human Rights Watch released another report on Bahrain:

[The] police are beating and torturing detainees, including minors, despite public commitments to end torture and police impunity. . . . Bahrain has displaced the problem of torture and police brutality from inside police stations to the point of arrest and transfer to police stations. . . . Human Rights Watch raised the issue of police brutality and torture during arrest and at informal facilities with Bahrain's chief of public security, Major General Tariq al-Hasan, and his two senior international advisers, John Yates and John Timoney, on 17 April. Timoney and Yates said they had visited some of the facilities identified by Human Rights Watch but found no evidence at the time of their visits of detainees being taken there and mistreated.

A few weeks later, the Bahraini government was forced to deny independent autopsy evidence that Yousef Mowali, a 23-year-old man with mental health problems, had been electrocuted and otherwise tortured by the police until he lost consciousness; Mowali was then dumped in water while still unconscious and drowned.

== See also ==
- News media phone hacking scandal
- News International phone hacking scandal
- Phone hacking scandal reference lists
- Metropolitan police role in phone hacking scandal

Police appointments
Preceded by Stephen House	Metropolitan Police Service; Assistant Commissioner (Specialist Crime Directorate); 2006–2009	Succeeded by Cressida Dick
Preceded by Bob Quick	Metropolitan Police Service; Assistant Commissioner (Specialist Operations); 2009–2011	Succeeded by Cressida Dick
