= Operation Glade =

Metropolitan Police Service investigation

Operation Glade was a Metropolitan Police Service investigation into allegations of possible corruption in the police service.

It was John Boyall's role at The News of the World which first encouraged the police to start Operation Glade's investigation into the dubious practices at the newspaper concerning the hacking of peoples mobile phones and text messages. 9 victims were said to be eligible for payouts are:

1. the former MP George Galloway,
2. the former director of the Football Association David Davies,
3. the comic actor Steve Coogan,
4. the former football executive Mick McGuire,
5. the jockey Kieren Fallon,
6. the consultant Mary-Ellen Field,
7. the personal assistant Ben Jackson,
8. the actor Leslie Ash.

== See also ==
- Operation Weeting
- Operation Motorman
- News International phone hacking scandal
- Metropolitan police role in phone hacking scandal
- Phone hacking scandal reference lists
