= Glenn Mulcaire =

English private investigator

- Born: Glenn Michael Mulcaire; 8 September 1970 (age 56); Chelsea, England
- Occupations: Author, former Private investigator and non-league footballer.Books published 'Shadow Man' & 'The News Machine'
- Spouse: Alison Mulcaire
- Children: 5

Glenn Michael Mulcaire (born 8 September 1970) is an English author, private investigator, and former non-league footballer. He was closely involved in the News International phone hacking scandal, and was imprisoned for six months in 2007 for his role in phone hacking and given a six-month suspended sentence at the hacking trial of 2013–14.

== Football career ==
Mulcaire is a former non-league footballer who played in the lower tiers of the English football league system, including a spell at the then newly formed AFC Wimbledon, when he was also known as "Trigger". He previously played for Fulham youth team, Dorking, Egham Town and Harrow Borough.

Mulcaire became the first man to score a goal for AFC Wimbledon when playing against Bromley in July 2002.

Mulcaire played in several pre-season friendlies and for the newly formed AFC Wimbledon scoring twice (in their third and fourth games). Once the 2002–03 season started he only started once and appeared as a substitute six times. His last match was as a substitute in a Premier Challenge Cup game on 12 October 2002.

He later played for and managed Netherne Village for the 2002–03 season. He left in August 2003 after sustaining an injury.

== Investigator career ==
Mulcaire applied for a position with a branch of the special forces, hoping to progress to Defence Intelligence, but was rejected as being too young. He then began work tracking individuals for private commercial intelligence assessment. After doing some work for News of the World, he was urged to establish his own consultancy and work exclusively for the paper. He then went on to work in 2010 for Lord Stevens' security and intelligence company 'Quest' as a senior investigator.

=== News of the World and phone hacking scandal ===
In January 2007, Mulcaire was found guilty of illegally intercepting phone messages from Clarence House and imprisoned for six months after pleading guilty; his co-conspirator News of the World royal editor Clive Goodman was sentenced to four months. Renewed controversy over the phone hacking scandal led to the closure of the News of the World in July 2011. He publicly apologised to those affected by his activities.

By August 2012, the Metropolitan Police, using documents obtained from raiding Mulcaire's office, had identified 4,744 potential victims of phone hacking by News of the World. Since police renewed investigations in 2011, 90 people have been arrested and 16 formally charged with crimes, including Mulcaire, in conjunction with illegal acquisition of confidential information.

Mulcaire was one of the defendants in phone hacking trial of 2013–14 which lasted eight months. Mulcaire pleaded guilty and on 4 July 2014, was sentenced to six months in prison, suspended for 12 months and ordered to undertake 200 hours unpaid work for the community. This was the lightest sentence of all the defendants and the judge remarked that he was the lucky one, expressing his view that Mulcaire's prior sentence was "too short to reflect the full extent of your phone hacking activities".

== Personal life ==
Mulcaire is married and has five children.

Mulcaire received £80,000 from News of the World in a confidentiality deal related to his planned book, provisionally titled Hear to Here: The Inside Story of the Royal Household Tapes and The Murky World of the Media. In 2014, it was reported that he had been made bankrupt.

On 6 June 2024, Mulcaire launched a new book, Shadow Man, alongside author Joe Cusack.

He is played by George Russo in the 2025 ITV drama about the News International phone hacking scandal, The Hack.

== See also ==
- News media phone hacking scandal
- Phone hacking scandal reference lists
- Metropolitan police role in phone hacking scandal
