= Neil Wallis =

British former newspaper editor (born 1950)

Neil John Wallis
- Born: 4 October 1950 (age 76)
- Occupation: Journalist

Neil John Wallis (born 4 October 1950) is a British former newspaper editor. He is currently a media consultant and media commentator.

== Early life ==
Wallis was born in Lincolnshire. His mother, from Liverpool, served with the Women's Auxiliary Air Force in the war.

He attended Skegness Grammar School. Wallis left school with four O Levels, and an A Level, from Boston College.

He grew up at 32 Tarran Way in Skegness, the son of John William Canning Wallis. His father had worked as a steward on liners in the Merchant Navy from 1935 to 1947 and 1953 to 1955. His brother Ian, and Ian's wife, also went to the grammar school, and married in February 1973. Another brother was Bruce.

Aged 19 in December 1969, Wallis appeared at Skegness magistrates, charged with joint burglary and theft, and joint burglary with intent. At Lincoln court, in January 1970, Wallis pleaded guilty. The head of Skegness CID, Detective Chief Inspector Robert Davidson originally from Girvan in South Ayrshire, thought that Wallis was a 'good boy'. Wallis was put on probation for three years, and told to mix with better people.

== Career ==
=== Journalism ===
Wallis gained his first employment working for the Skegness Standard, leaving after six months to work for the Worksop Guardian as part of a National Council for the Training of Journalists (NCTJ) scheme, during which he also studied at Richmond College of Further Education in Sheffield. Having passed his NCTJ exams, Wallis worked for The Northern Echo (in its Durham office) before becoming a senior reporter for the Manchester Evening News. At this point in his career, Wallis became a Crime Reporter, giving talks to police officers on police-media relations, whilst also freelancing for The Sunday People, progressing from the paper's Manchester desk to its London office. Wallis later said: "During this time I travelled extensively throughout Britain and the world as both a hard news reporter and as an investigator. This included lengthy periods in the USA, the Middle East and Northern Ireland during the 'Troubles' - where I was hospitalised after being caught up in a particularly violent riot. I spent six months in Argentina during the Falklands War including spells in Buenos Aires and Commadorio Rivadavia, the invasion base of the Argentinean Junta. I also spent time in most countries in Europe and the Mediterranean". Wallis then became the paper's Chief Investigative Reporter, responsible for conducting investigations into "murders, show business scandals, corruption, crime in general, drugs, spying and politics".

In December 1986, he joined News International's UK tabloid newspaper The Sun where he served in a series of assistant and editorial roles before becoming Deputy Editor in 1993. He left The Sun in 1998 and took up the editorship of The People. In 2003, he moved to become Deputy Editor of the News of the World, and in 2007 he became Executive Editor of the paper. In May 2009, he announced that he would be leaving his post later in the year. He was known as "The Wolfman" by fellow journalists.

Wallis is a former member of the Editors' Code of Practice Committee at the Press Complaints Commission. Wallis currently works regularly as a media commentator for both television and radio stations such as talkRADIO

=== Public relations ===
After leaving journalism he worked for the Outside Organisation, a company specialising in public relations, becoming Managing Director in 2010. Wallis' own company, Chamy Media, provided "strategic communication advice and support" to the Metropolitan Police on a part-time basis from October 2009 to September 2010 whilst the Met's Deputy Director of Public Affairs was on extended sick leave.

It is alleged that while recovering from illness Sir Paul Stephenson, head of the Metropolitan Police, accepted a free extended stay (worth £12,000) at a Champneys health spa, a company which then employed Wallis for PR work. Upon announcing his resignation from the Metropolitan Police on 17 July 2011, Stephenson acknowledged that his decision to resign was "in particular in relation to Neil Wallis".

== Arrest and prosecution ==
On 14 July 2011, Wallis was arrested by the Metropolitan Police investigating the News of the World phone hacking scandal.

At this development, the Outside Organisation edited their website, removing his listing as MD and a part of his biography which had stated "What he [Wallis] doesn’t know about journalism and media isn’t worth knowing". In February 2013, it emerged the Crown Prosecution Service (CPS) would not be charging Wallis over phone hacking.

This changed on 30 July 2014, when the CPS announced that it had authorised the Metropolitan Police to charge Wallis with conspiring to hack phones to listen to voicemails between January 2003 and January 2007. The charges were brought as part of Operation Pinetree into ex-News of the World features staff, a separate inquiry to the one into hacking by the paper's newsroom staff which resulted in the jailing of ex-News of the World editor Andy Coulson. In its statement the CPS said it had been decided there was "sufficient evidence for a realistic prospect of conviction and that a prosecution is in the public interest". The paper's former features editor Jules Stenson was also charged and was scheduled to appear with Wallis before Westminster Magistrates' Court on 21 August 2014. They both subsequently appeared at a case management hearing at the Old Bailey in December 2014 at which Wallis pleaded not guilty to the charges against him and Stenson pleaded guilty. Wallis' trial began at the Old Bailey in June 2015, he was represented by Phil Smith of Simons Muirhead Burton; He denied the charges against him. On 1 July 2015, Wallis was unanimously cleared by the jury after it had spent four days considering the charges against him. Speaking outside the court Wallis said he was feeling "very emotional", adding that the case against him had been part of a "vicious politically driven campaign" against the press. He claimed that fighting the claims against him had cost him his life savings, damaged his health and career, and taken a toll on his family.

== See also ==
- News International phone hacking scandal
- Phone hacking scandal reference lists
- Metropolitan police role in phone hacking scandal

Media offices
Preceded by Stuart Higgins	Deputy Editor of The Sun; 1993–1998	Succeeded by Rebekah Wade
Preceded by Brendon Parsons	Editor of The People; 1998–2003	Succeeded by Mark Thomas
Preceded by Andy Coulson	Deputy Editor of the News of the World; 2003–2007	Succeeded by Jane Johnson
