= Les Hinton =

British-American journalist, writer and business executive

- Born: Leslie Frank Hinton; 19 February 1944 (age 82); Bootle, Lancashire, England
- Citizenship: United States (naturalized 1986)
- Occupations: Journalist and writer, publisher, former CEO of Dow Jones & Company
- Spouses: Mary Christine Weadick (m. 1968–2009) Katharine Margaret Raymond (m. 2009)
- Children: 5
- Parent(s): Frank Arthur Hinton; Lilian Amy (née Bruce)

Leslie Frank Hinton (born 19 February 1944) is a British-American journalist, writer and business executive whose career with Rupert Murdoch's News Corporation spanned more than fifty years. Hinton worked in newspapers, magazines and television as a reporter, editor and executive in Australia, the United Kingdom and the United States and became an American citizen in 1986. He was appointed CEO of Dow Jones & Company in December 2007, after its acquisition by News Corp. Hinton has variously been described as Murdoch's "hitman"; one of his "most trusted lieutenants"; and an "astute political operator". He left the company in 2011. His memoir, The Bootle Boy, was published in the UK in May 2018, and in the US under the title An Untidy Life in October of the same year. His first fiction book, Dying Days, a thriller set against the backdrop of the transAtlanic newspaper industry, was published by Whitefox in November 2025.

== Early life ==
Hinton, the son of a British Army chef and a seamstress, was born in the docklands of Bootle, a working-class area of Lancashire, now Merseyside. He travelled with his family as his father was posted around the world, attending Army schools in Egypt, Ethiopia, Libya, Germany, and Singapore, as well as Liverpool. He had little formal education after failing his Eleven-plus, and left his Liverpool school in 1959, aged 15. In the same year, he emigrated to Adelaide, Australia.

== Murdoch and News Corporation ==
Except for a few years in London in the 1960s, Hinton spent his entire career with Rupert Murdoch and News Corporation. He began work as a copy boy in 1959 at the Adelaide News in South Australia, where 28-year-old Murdoch was managing director. One of his first tasks was to bring Murdoch his lunchtime sandwiches. After finishing his training as a journalist, Hinton moved to London, where he worked as a reporter at United Press International, and the then-broadsheet newspaper The Sun, before Murdoch acquired it in 1969. As a reporter, Hinton was injured while covering the Northern Ireland conflict and in 1976 he was appointed foreign correspondent for the group's newspapers and moved to New York. Hinton later worked as associate editor of the Boston Herald and editor-in-chief of Star.

In 1990, Hinton became president of Murdoch Magazines and then president and chief executive officer of News America Publishing, responsible for the company's US publishing operations. In 1993, he was appointed chairman and CEO of Fox Television Stations.

He returned to London in 1995 as executive chairman of News Corp subsidiary News International, publisher of The Times, The Sunday Times, The Sun, The Times Literary Supplement, The Times Educational Supplement and the now defunct titles Today and The News of the World where he stayed for eleven years.

In 2007, Hinton returned to the United States to become CEO of Dow Jones & Company and publisher of The Wall Street Journal. In 2009, in a speech to the World Association of Newspapers in Hyderabad, Hinton criticized Google and the "false gospel" of the Internet, and called for the newspaper industry to charge for digital content: "Free costs too much. News is a business and we should not be afraid to say it. These digital visionaries...talk about the wonders of the interconnected world, about the democratization of journalism...Well, I think all of us need to beware of geeks bearing gifts."

Hinton later admitted in an interview with London's Daily Telegraph that some Journal staff were wary when News Corp bought the newspaper, but said: "If you believed everything you read about the attitude towards us that was alleged to exist, you would have been expected to wear a damn flak-jacket when you came in to the building."

In an article for British Journalism Review in 2015, Hinton described Murdoch as: "a driven businessman with heavy boots who has bruised a lot of people in the last half century." He went on to say: "As a boss, he can be hands-off or autocratic, charming or irascible, forgiving or fierce, and sometimes just a comprehensive pain."

In May 2018, Hinton's memoir The Bootle Boy: an untidy life in news was published by Scribe in the United Kingdom, Australia and the USA. Although it was described as "an epic story… and a penetrating insight into the mind of Murdoch" that "vividly captures the rise and fall of the press", one British newspaper reported that: "despite the close relationship between the men, Murdoch is not spared: he could be unfair, capricious and exasperating… And Hinton is candid about the brutal firings he himself carried out in the companies he ran in the US".

== Phone hacking and British parliamentary hearings ==
On 15 July 2011, Hinton resigned as publisher of The Wall Street Journal as a result of the unfolding journalistic ethics scandal at News International – phone hacking – where Hinton had been executive chairman. In his resignation letter to Murdoch, Hinton said that although he was "ignorant of what apparently happened...I feel it is proper for me to resign". In an interview for Reuters, Peter Burden, author of a 2008 book about The News of the World said: "The person that I think is most of a problem for Murdoch is Les Hinton. He was definitely around when it was going on... and for him to be seen to be mixed up in that whole tacky situation would be very, very damaging indeed."

Upon his departure, The Wall Street Journal ran an editorial praising Hinton's contribution to returning the paper to profitability "amid a terrible business climate". The New Yorker ran a poem praising Hinton's hair

In a climate later described by The Wall Street Journal as "a political frenzy" on 1 May 2012, the House of Commons Culture, Media and Sport Select Committee, chaired by Conservative MP John Whittingdale and including Labour members Tom Watson and Paul Farrelly, published a report in which it accused Hinton and others of misleading it during its enquiries into the phone hacking scandal. It also said that Hinton had been 'complicit in the cover-up' at News International. In a 'robust rebuttal letter' to the Committee, Hinton denied both allegations, describing them as 'unfair, unfounded and erroneous' and based on 'a selective and misleading analysis of my testimonies'.

During a debate on 22 May 2012, the House of Commons refused to endorse the Culture, Media and Sport Select Committee's report, and referred the case to its own ethics watchdog, the Standards and Privileges Committee, for further investigation.

On 14 September 2016, Parliament's ethics committee, the Committee of Privileges, published its own report exonerating Hinton and refuting the original Whittingdale report. The Committee of Privileges stated that the evidence had failed to: "meet the standard of proof" required by Parliament and went on to conclude: "there is no evidence that [Hinton] misled the [Culture, Media and Sport] Committee". In a statement, Hinton described the findings as "too little and too late", saying he had been "vilified". Hinton also said: "Parliament has a back-to-front idea of justice and fairness ... after allowing the sham trial and free-for-all character assassination I experienced in 2012."

In an editorial three days later The Wall Street Journal said: "Les Hinton must be wondering to which office he should go to get his reputation back. The question was first asked by former Secretary of Labor Ray Donovan after he was acquitted of trumped-up fraud charges in 1987. But it applies to Mr. Hinton, who was CEO of our parent company Dow Jones until he resigned amid questions about his involvement in the phone-hacking scandal that took down Britain's News of the World tabloid in 2011." The newspaper went on to say that the British Parliament's [Culture, Media and Sport] committee's false report about Hinton "should be a warning of the damage that political frenzies can do to the lives and careers of honorable men."

== Personal life ==
Hinton and his long-time partner Katharine Raymond – a former adviser to British Home Secretary David Blunkett and Prime Minister Gordon Brown – married at a private ceremony in London in 2009. The wedding celebration was attended by politicians and journalists including Tessa Jowell, David Blunkett, Margaret McDonagh, Sarah Brown, Kay Burley, and Rebekah Brooks. They live on Manhattan's upper east side.

== See also ==
- News Corporation
- The Wall Street Journal
