= List of people arrested in the News International phone-hacking scandal =

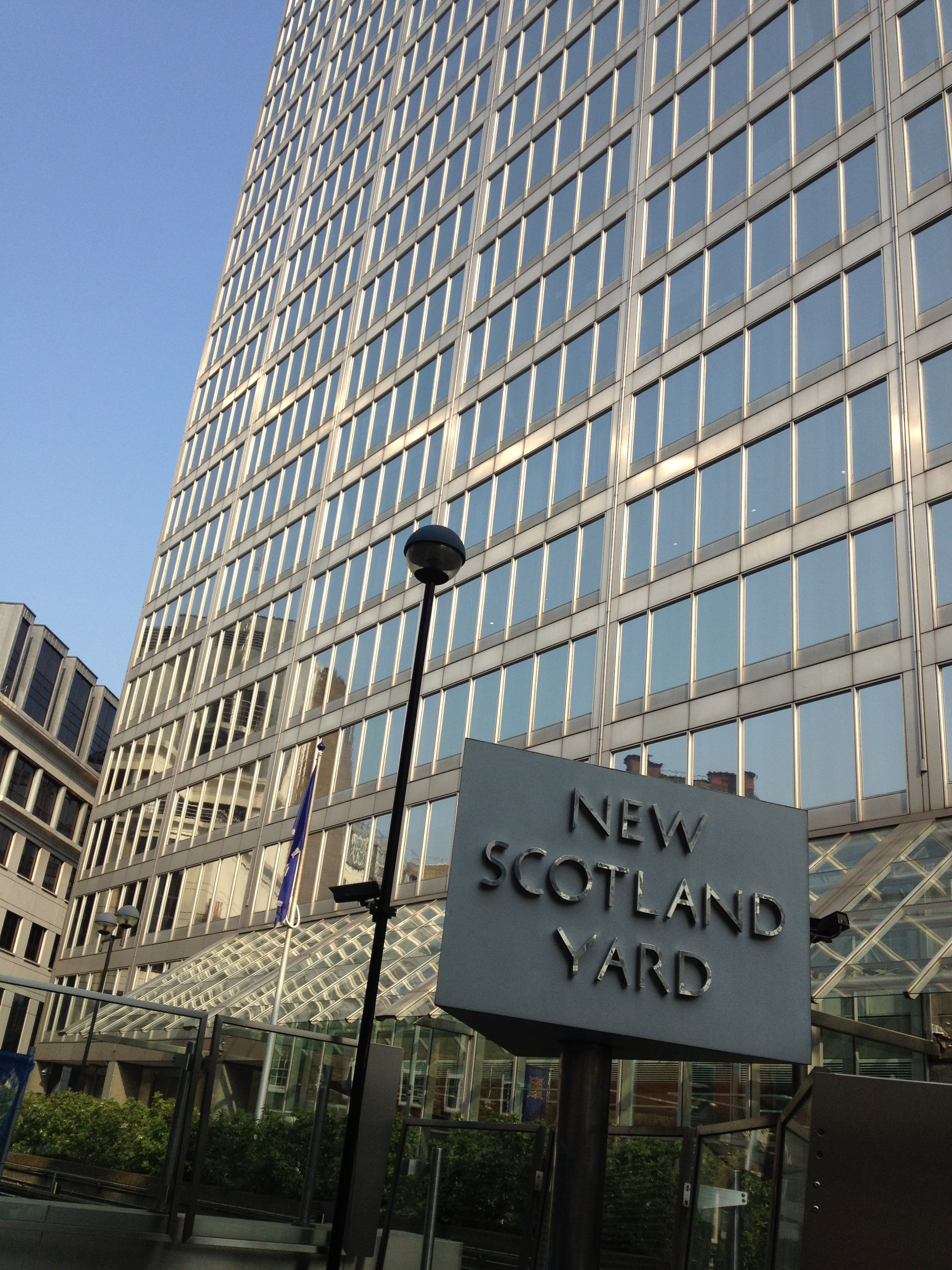
Renewed Investigations by Scotland Yard in 2011 led to dozens of arrests for activities related to the phone hacking scandal.

This list of persons arrested in phone-hacking scandal is a chronological listing of individuals arrested in conjunction with the illegal acquisition of confidential information by employees and other agents of news media companies referred to as the "phone hacking scandal." Dates indicate approximately when each arrest was made. The police investigation ("Operation") under which each arrest was made is shown in parentheses.

== Background ==
In 2004, ten arrests were made under Operation Nigeria following placement of a police listening device in the office of private investigator Jonathan Rees and a subsequent raid on the home of Stephen Whittamore. Recorded conversations and seized documents established that Paul Marshall, a former civilian communications officer based at Tooting police station in London, provided confidential information to Alan King, a retired police officer, who passed it along to private investigator John Boyall, who in turn gave it to private investigator Stephen Whittamore, who in turn sold it to agents of national press organizations. All were convicted of crimes.

In 2006, three arrests were made as a result of the Royal Household/Goodman Inquiry into illegal interception of phone messages of members of the Royal household by Clive Goodman and Glenn Mulcaire. Goodman and Mulcaire pleaded guilty to crimes.

In September 2009, Metropolitan Police Service Assistant Commissioner John Yates testified before the Commons Culture, Media and Sport Committee that "there remain now insufficient grounds or evidence to arrest or interview anyone else and...no additional evidence has come to light." In 2011, however, investigations renewed in response to public disclosures from the press. These resulted in many additional arrests that included law enforcement officers, public officials and former editors and executives of news organizations.

As of mid-October 2012, over 100 people had been arrested since 1999 relating to illegal acquisition of confidential information. All but 10 of these were arrested or rearrested since police investigations were renewed in 2011. In some cases, a single individual was arrested more than once or arrested in conjunction with more than one police operation.

09 Operation Nigeria (confidential information)
03 Royal Household/Goodman Inquiry (phone hacking)
25 Operation Weeting (phone hacking)
52 Operation Elveden (computer hacking)
16 Operation Tuleta (bribery, corruption)
03 Operation Rubicon (phone hacking, breach of data protection and perjury in Scotland)
04 No named police operation
-08 Adjustment for arrests included under more than one operation (e.g. one person arrested for both Weeting and Elveden)
---
104 Total people arrested

Of these arrests, at least 40 have been current or former journalists, 21 at The Sun, 16 at News of the World, 2 at the Mirror, 1 at The Times, and another from an unnamed newspaper.

== Arrested ==
1. Neville Thurlbeck; (1999) arrested for allegedly bribing a police officer and for conspiracy. Prosecution alleged Thurlbeck paid Detective Con Farmer to supply information on people whose details were kept on a confidential police computer. (The arrest was not attributed to a specific police operation.) (5 April 2011) arrested again; chief reporter at News of the World; suspicion of unlawfully intercepting mobile phone voicemail messages (Weeting #2)
2. Richard Farmer; (1999) police officer arrested on suspicion of taking a bribe to supply information on people whose details were kept on a confidential police computer. (The arrest was not attributed to a specific police operation.)
3. John Boyall; (2004) private investigator (Nigeria #1)
4. Steve Whittamore; (2004) private investigator (Nigeria #2)
5. Alan King; (2004) retired police officer (Nigeria #3)
6. Paul Marshall; (2004) former civilian communications officer (Nigeria #4)
7. John Gunning (2005) private investigator (Nigeria #5)
8. Christopher Dawse (2005) private investigator (Nigeria #6)
9. Mark Maskell (2005) private investigator (Nigeria #7)
10. Andrew Lyle (2005) private investigator (Nigeria #8)
11. Paul Jones aka Taff Jones (2005) private investigator (Nigeria #9)
12. Clive Goodman; (8 August 2006 & 8 July 2011) former royal correspondent for News of the World; suspicion of corruption (Royal #1) & (Elveden #2)
13. Glenn Mulcaire; (8 August 2006) private investigator (7 December 2011) arrested again on suspicion of attempting to pervert the course of justice (Royal #2) & (Weeting #14)
14. David Craig; (August 2006) editor of The Weekly News (Royal #3)
15. Ian Edmondson; (5 April 2011) former news editor at News of the World; suspicion of conspiring to intercept communications and unlawful interception of voicemail messages (Weeting #1)
16. James Weatherup; (14 April 2011) assistant news editor at News of the World arrested on suspicion of unlawfully intercepting communications (Weeting #3)
17. Terenia Taras; (23 June 2011) freelance journalist who contributed stories to the News of the World; suspicion of conspiring to intercept communications (Weeting #4) The Crown Prosecution Service announced on 24 July 2012 that charges would not be pursued due to insufficient evidence.
18. Laura Elston; (27 June 2011) worked for the Press Association as royal correspondent; arrested on suspicion of phone hacking "Has been told that she has been dropped from the inquiry and will face no further action. (Weeting #5)"
19. Andy Coulson; (8 July 2011) former Chief Press Secretary to David Cameron and former News of the World editor; suspicion of conspiring to intercept communications (Weeting #6) & (Elveden #1) Arrested again (30 May 2012) by Strathclyde Scotland police on suspicion of committing perjury before the high court in Glasgow under section 14 of the Criminal Procedure (Scotland) Act 1995. It is alleged that perjury was committed during the 2010 trial of Tommy Sheridan at which Coulson denied having ever heard of Glenn Mulcaire and denied knowledge of phone hacking. (Rubicon #1)
20. 63-year-old man; (8 July 2011) arrested and bailed Arrested "on suspicion of corruption allegations contrary to Section 1 of the Prevention of Corruption Act 1906." (Elveden #3)
21. Neil Wallis; (14 July 2011) former News of the World executive editor; taken for questioning on suspicion of conspiring to intercept communications (Weeting #7)
22. Rebekah Brooks; (17 July 2011) former CEO of News International, former editor of The Sun and former editor for News of the World; suspicion of conspiring to intercept communications and on suspicion of corruption, i.e., illegal payments to police (13 March 2012) arrested again, this time on suspicion of perverting the course of justice (Weeting #8 & Elveden #4)
23. Stuart Kuttner; (2 August 2011) former managing editor of the News of the World; suspicion of conspiring to intercept communications and on suspicion of corruption (Weeting #9) & Elveden #5)
24. Greg Miskiw; (10 August 2011) former News of the World news editor; suspicion of unlawful interception of communications and conspiring to intercept communications (Weeting #10)
25. James Desborough; (18 August 2011) former News of the World Los Angeles-based, Hollywood US editor; suspicion of conspiring to intercept communications, contrary to section 1 (1) of the Criminal Law Act 1977 (Weeting #11)
26. Dan Evans; (19 August 2011) former reporter for News of the World arrested on suspicion of phone hacking (Weeting #12)
27. 51-year-old man; (19 August 2011) Police Detective at Metropolitan Police Service; "on suspicion of misconduct in public office over alleged unauthorised leaks from the Operation Weeting phone-hacking inquiry". (The arrest was not attributed to a specific police operation.) Has not been charged but has been suspended.
28. Ross Hall; (2 September 2011) a.k.a. Ross Hindley, former reporter for News of the World who reportedly transcribed hacked voicemails included in the "For Neville" email. Arrested "on suspicion of conspiracy to intercept voicemail messages and perverting the course of justice" (Weeting #13) The Crown Prosecution Service announced on 24 July 2012 that charges would not be pursued due to insufficient evidence.
29. Raoul Simons; (7 September 2011) deputy football editor of The Times, "on suspicion of conspiracy to intercept voicemail messages, contrary to Section 1 (1) Criminal Law Act 1977" (Weeting #15) The Crown Prosecution Service announced on 24 July 2012 that charges would not be pursued due to insufficient evidence.
30. Jamie Pyatt; (4 November 2011) district editor of The Sun; arrested in conjunction with Operation Elveden "on suspicion of corruption allegations in contravention of section 1 of the Prevention of Corruption Act 1906." (Elveden #6)
31. 52-year-old man; (11 November 2011) arrested in Milton Keynes regarding alleged computer hacking by the press (Tuleta #1)
32. Bethany Usher; (30 November 2011) Former journalist with News of the World on suspicion of intercepting voicemail messages. Cleared and released with Scotland Yard saying no further action would be taken. (Weeting #16)
33. Lucy Panton; (15 December 2011) former crime editor of News of the World believed to have been arrested in relation to alleged payments to police officers (Elveden #7)
34. 52-year-old woman; (21 December 2011) serving police officer, believed to be a royal protection officer arrested regarding possibly receiving payments from journalists (Elveden #8)
35. Cheryl Carter (6 January 2012) personal assistant to former News International chief executive Rebekah Brooks; arrested in relation to phone hacking on suspicion of attempting to pervert the course of justice (Weeting #17)
36. Dave Cook; (10 Jan 2012) Met Detective Chief Superintendent arrested on suspicion of misconduct in a public office and violations of the Data Protection Act 1998 in conjunction with an IPCC investigation. Cook and his family were reportedly the target of News of the World surveillance while he was investigating the Daniel Morgan murder. (Elveden #9)
37. 29-year-old man; (28 January 2012) a Police Constable arrested on suspicion of corruption, aiding and abetting misconduct in a public office and conspiracy (Elveden #10)
38. Mike Sullivan; (28 January 2012) crime editor of The Sun; arrested on suspicion of corruption, aiding and abetting misconduct in a public office and conspiracy (Elveden #11)
39. Graham Dudman; (28 January 2012) former managing editor of The Sun arrested on suspicion of corruption, aiding and abetting misconduct in public office and conspiracy (Elveden #12)
40. Fergus Shanahan; (28 January 2012) executive editor of The Sun arrested on suspicion of corruption, aiding and abetting misconduct in a public office and conspiracy (Elveden #13)
41. Chris Pharo; (28 January 2012) news desk executive of The Sun arrested on suspicion of corruption, aiding and abetting misconduct in a public office and conspiracy (Elveden #14)
42. Geoff Webster; (11 February 2012) deputy editor of The Sun arrested on suspicion of corruption, aiding and abetting misconduct in a public office and conspiracy (Elveden #15)
43. John Kay; (11 February 2012) chief reporter of The Sun arrested on suspicion of corruption, aiding and abetting misconduct in a public office and conspiracy (Elveden #16)
44. John Edwards; (11 February 2012) picture editor of The Sun arrested on suspicion of corruption, aiding and abetting misconduct in a public office and conspiracy (Elveden #17)
45. Nick Parker; (11 February 2012) chief foreign correspondent for The Sun arrested on suspicion of corruption, aiding and abetting misconduct in a public office and conspiracy (Elveden #18) Arrested again (30 July 2012) in conjunction with gathering of data from stolen mobile phones (Tuleta #8)
46. John Sturgis; (11 February 2012) deputy news editor of The Sun arrested on suspicion of corruption, aiding and abetting misconduct in a public office and conspiracy ((Elveden #19)
47. 39-year-old man; (11 February 2012) police officer from the Surrey Police arrested on suspicion of corruption, aiding and abetting misconduct in a public office and conspiracy (Elveden #20)
48. 39-year-old man; (11 February 2012) Ministry of Defence official arrested on suspicion of corruption, misconduct in a public office and conspiracy. Wife of the below (Elveden #21)
49. 36-year-old man; (11 February 2012) British Army Major arrested on suspicion of corruption, misconduct in a public office and conspiracy. Husband of the above (Elveden #22)
50. Steve Hayes; (24 Feb 2012) Owner of London Wasps and Wycombe Wanderers F.C. arrested in Hertfordshire on suspicion of offenses under the Computer Misuse Act 1990 and the Regulation of Investigatory Powers Act 2000 (RIPA) (Tuleta #2)
51. Graham Freeman; (24 Feb 2012) Founder of a security consultancy with a former British Army intelligence officer arrested in Surrey same day and on same charges as Steve Hayes (Tuleta #3)
52. Virginia Wheeler; (1 March 2012) defense correspondent for The Sun arrested on suspicion of corruption under the Prevention of Corruption Act 1906 and aiding and abetting misconduct in a public office. (Elveden #?) per The Telegraph.
53. Charles Patrick Evelyn Brooks; (13 March 2012) husband of Rebekah Brooks believed to have been arrested on suspicion of perverting the course of justice (Weeting #18)
54. Daryl Jorsling; (13 March 2012) Hampshire man arrested on suspicion of perverting the course of justice (Weeting #19)
55. Paul Edwards; (13 March 2012) West London man arrested on suspicion of perverting the course of justice (Weeting #20)
56. 38-year-old man; (13 March 2012) Hertfordshire man arrested on suspicion of perverting the course of justice; released and told no further action would be taken. (Weeting #21)
57. Mark Hanna; (13 March 2012) East London man arrested on suspicion of perverting the course of justice ((Weeting #22))
58. Duncan Larcombe; (19 April 2012) royal editor of The Sun arrested on suspicion of conspiracy to corrupt and to cause misconduct in public office (Elveden #23)
59. 42-year-old man; (19 April 2012) British Armed Forces member arrested on suspicion of misconduct in public office (Elveden #24)
60. 38-year-old woman; (19 April 2012) arrested on suspicion of aiding and abetting misconduct in public office (Elveden #25)
61. 57-year-old; (3 May 2012) retired officer from Scotland Yard's Specialist Operations command, with responsibilities including protecting members of the royal family and countering terror operations, arrested on suspicion of misconduct in public office (Elveden #26)
62. 50-year-old man; (15 May 2012) HM Revenue and Customs official (Elveden #27)
63. 43-year-old woman; (15 May 2012) from same address as 50-year-old man arrested on same day (Elveden #28)
64. Keith Hunter; (23 May 2012) a former Metropolitan Police Service detective and current chief executive of RISC, Management a private investigation firm working for James Ibori, reportedly a Nigerian fraudster, on suspicion of bribing a police officer Elveden #29
65. 45-year-old man; (23 May 2012) a serving detective on suspicion of receiving payments for informationElveden #30
66. 58-year-old man; (23 May 2012) former police officer arrested on suspicion of bribery of a police officerElveden #31
67. Unknown Man; (23 May 2012) former police officer arrested on suspicion of bribery of a police officer Elveden #32
68. Clodagh Hartley; (25 May 2012) Whitehall editor for The Sun arrested on suspicion of conspiracy to corrupt under the Prevention of Corruption Act 1906, on suspicion of conspiracy to cause misconduct in a public office, contrary to common law, and on suspicion of bribery, contrary to the Bribery Act 2010 (Elveden #33)
69. 42-year-old woman; (28 May 2012) on suspicion of money-laundering, the first for Operation Weeting to be arrested for this offense (Weeting #23)
70. 53-year-old man; (26 June 2012) arrested in West Sussex (Tuleta #4)
71. 65-year-old man; (28 June 2012) arrested in London (Tuleta #5)
72. 31-year-old man; (28 June 2012) National Health Service employee arrested on suspicion of conspiracy to cause misconduct in a public office and on suspicion of corruption under the Prevention of Corruption Act 1906 (Elveden #34)
73. Greg Box-Turnbull; (4 July 2012) former journalist for the Trinity Mirror first journalist arrested who did not work for News International; arrested on conspiracy to commit bribery and cause misconduct in public office (Elveden #35)
74. 46-year-old man; (4 July 2012) prison officer on conspiracy to commit bribery and cause misconduct in public office (Elveden #36)
75. 50-year-old woman; (4 July 2012) arrested for conspiracy to commit bribery and cause misconduct in public office (Elveden #37)
76. Lee Sandell; 26-year-old man (5 July 2012) current employee of News International who is not part of an editorial team arrested on suspicion of conspiracy to pervert the course of justice (Weeting #24)
77. 46-year-old man; (5 July 2012) National Health Service employee arrested on suspicion of corruption and of conspiracy to cause misconduct in public office. (Elveden #38)
78. 42-year-old woman; (5 July 2012) National Health Service employee arrested on suspicion of corruption and of conspiracy to cause misconduct in public office. (Elveden #39)
79. Justin Penrose; (11 July 2012) journalist at The Daily Mirror arrested on suspicion of conspiracy to corrupt and of conspiracy to cause misconduct in a public office (Elveden #40)
80. Tom Savage; (11 July 2012) deputy news editor from the Daily Star Sunday arrested on suspicion of conspiracy to corrupt and of conspiracy to cause misconduct in a public office (Elveden #41)
81. 55-year-old man; (17 July 2012) arrested in Cardiff on suspicion of offences under the Computer Misuse Act 1990 and the Regulation of Investigatory Powers Act 2000 (RIPA) (Tuleta #6)
82. Rhodri Phillips; 51-year-old (19 July 2012) journalist for The Sun arrested in London on suspicion of handling stolen goods (Tuleta #7)
83. 37-year-old man; (30 July 2012) journalist for The Sun arrested in London relating to "a suspected conspiracy involving the gathering of data from stolen mobile phones and is not about seeking journalists to reveal confidential sources in relation to information that has been obtained legitimately." (Tuleta #9)
84. 37-year-old man; (7 August 2012) journalist for The Sun arrested on suspicion of conspiracy to corrupt and conspiracy to cause misconduct in public office. Information on which the arrest was made was supplied to the Met by News Corporation's Management Standards Committee. (Elveden #42)
85. 29-year-old man; (7 August 2012) serving Sussex police officer arrested on suspicion of conspiracy to corrupt and conspiracy to cause misconduct in public office. (Elveden #43)
86. Douglas Wight; (17 August 2012) former news editor for News of the World in Scotland arrested and charged with committing perjury and conspiracy to hack telephones. (Rubicon #2)
87. 44-year-old man; person not directly linked to any news organisation or the activities of journalists was arrested in Suffolk on suspicion of violating the Computer Misuse Act 1990 and Regulation of Investigatory Powers Act 2000. (Tuleta #10)
88. Bob Bird; (29 August 2012) former Scotland editor for News of the World arrested and charged on suspicion of perjury and phone hacking relating to the trial of Scottish socialist leader Tommy Sheridan. (Rubicon #3)
89. Patrick Foster; 28-year-old man (29 August 2012) former journalist for The Times arrested on suspicion of offences under the Computer Misuse Act 1990 and conspiracy to pervert the course of justice relating to publicly identifying former police constable Richard Horton as the "NightJack blogger" in July 2009. (Tuleta #11)
90. Tom Crone; "60-year-old man"; (30 August 2012) former legal manager for News of the World and The Sun and 26 year employee who worked alongside editors including Piers Morgan, Rebekah Brooks and Andy Coulson, arrested on suspicion of conspiracy to intercept communications in violation of section 1 of the Criminal Law Act 1977. The arrest was reportedly based upon information provided to police by News International's in-house investigative body, the Management and Standards Committee. (Weeting #25)
91. 33-year-old man; (7 September 2012) journalist arrested in London on suspicion of offences under the Theft Act 1968, Computer Misuse Act 1990, and on suspicion of conspiracy to pervert the course of justice. The arrest reportedly related to obtaining data from stolen mobile phones. (Tuleta #12)
92. 31-year-old man; (11 September 2012) serving police officer arrested on suspicion of conspiracy to corrupt and misconduct in public office relating to suspected payments to a prison officer. The arrest was based upon information provided to police by News Corporation's Management and Standards Committee. (Elveden #44)
93. 32-year-old woman; (13 September 2012) arrested on suspicion of conspiracy to commit corruption and suspicion of conspiracy to cause misconduct in a public office. She is married to a 42-year-old serving member of the armed forces who was arrested shortly afterward on the same day. The arrest was based upon information provided to police by News Corporation's Management and Standards Committee. (Elveden #45)
94. 42-year-old man; (13 September 2012) serving member of the armed forces arrested on suspicion of corruption and suspicion of misconduct in a public office. He is the husband of the 32-year-old woman arrested earlier on the same day. The arrest was based upon information provided to police by News Corporation's Management and Standards Committee. (Elveden #46)
95. 43-year-old man; (16 September 2012) arrested on suspicion of conspiracy to corrupt and to cause misconduct in a public office. The arrest was based upon information provided to police by News Corporation's Management and Standards Committee (Elveden #47).
96. John Coles; (9 September 2012) 51-year-old journalist, the West Country correspondent for The Sun arrested on suspicion of conspiracy to corrupt and to cause misconduct in a public office. (Evelden #48)
97. Tom Wells; 32-year-old man (9 September 2012) journalist for The Sun arrested in London related to suspected payments to a public official and suspected disclosure of confidential information by a police officer (Evelden #49)
98. 39-year-old man; (9 September 2012) serving police officer in Wiltshire arrested related to suspected payments to a public official and suspected disclosure of confidential information by a police officer (Evelden #50)
99. 28-year-old man; (date?) arrested in south London (Tuleta #13)
100. 30-year-old man; (20 Sep 2012) journalist for The Sun arrested in relation to a suspected conspiracy involving the gathering of data from stolen mobile phones (Tuleta #14)
101. Jonathan Rees; 58-year-old man; (2 Oct 2012) private investigator involved in the earliest days of the phone hacking scandal arrested at his home in Surrey for alleged offences under section 3 of the Computer Misuse Act 1990 and sections 1 and 2 of the Regulation of Investigatory Powers Act 2000 by police officers working on Operation Kalmyk. (Tuleta #15)
102. Alex Marunchak; 61-year-old man; (2 Oct 2012) journalist involved in the News media phone hacking scandal#Operation Nigeria|earliest days of the phone hacking scandal arrested for alleged offences under section 3 of the Computer Misuse Act 1990 and sections 1 and 2 of the Regulation of Investigatory Powers Act 2000 by police officers working on Operation Kalmyk. (Tuleta #16)
103. 34-year-old woman; (23 Oct 2012) Ministry of Defense official arrested at home in Rotherham, South Yorkshire on suspicion of misconduct in a public office and of corruption based upon information provided by the management and standards committee of News Corporation (Elveden #51)
104. 31-year-old man; (23 Oct 2012) serving member of the armed forces arrested at the same address in Rotherham, South Yorkshire, as the woman arrested same day on suspicion of aiding and abetting misconduct in public office and of money laundering. (Elveden #52)

== Charged with crimes ==
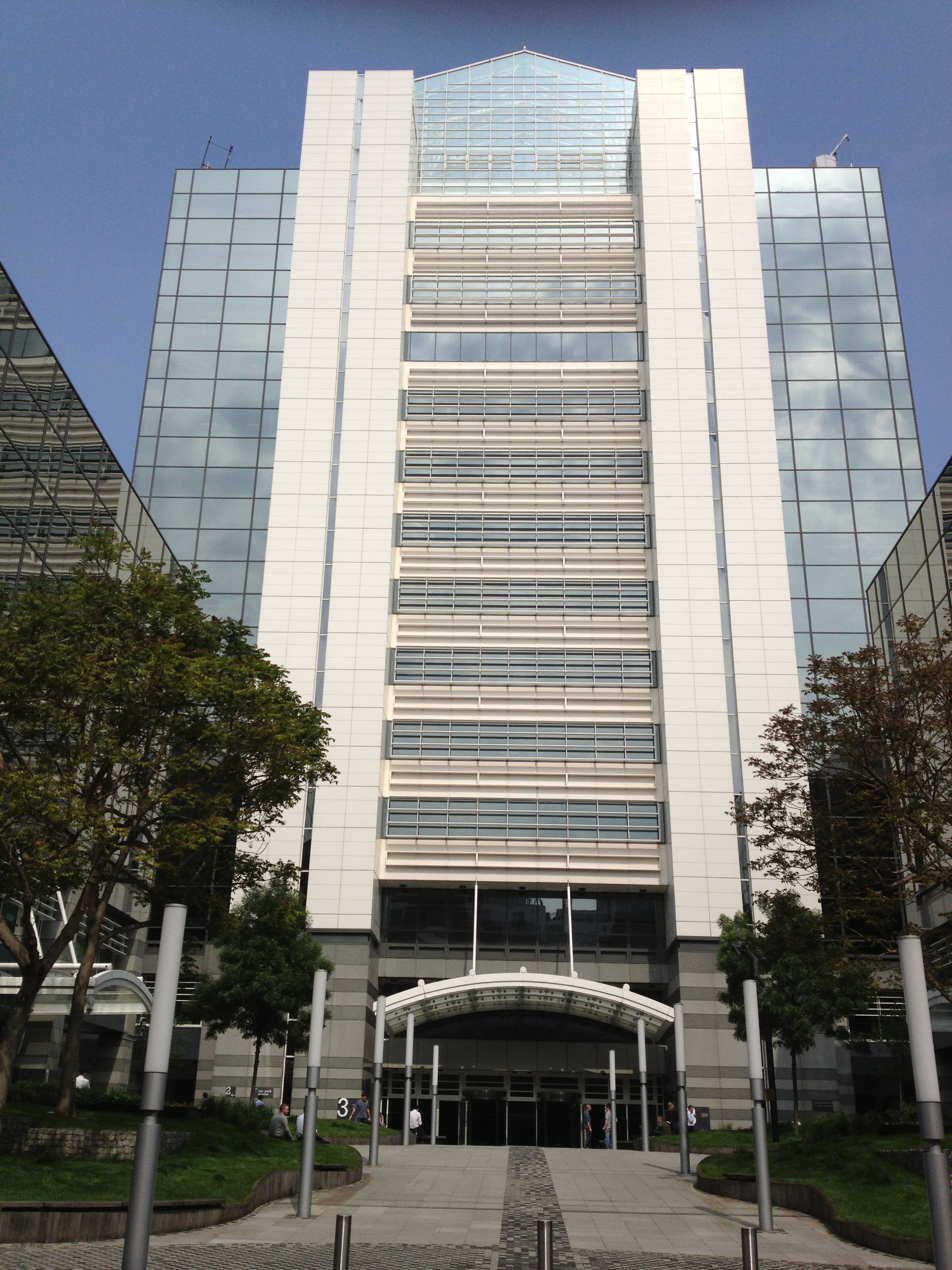
By mid-2012 formal charges had been filed against many News International journalists and executives, including former chief executive Rebekah Brooks.

This is a chronological list of individuals charged with crimes relating to the phone hacking scandal since 1999. Some individuals are listed more than once because they were charged at different times for different offenses. As of September 2012, 31 people had been charged, including five who had been charged twice.

The first two were charged in 1999 relating to alleged bribery of a police officer to obtain confidential information from a police computer. They were tried but acquitted when the judge directed the verdict due to lack of evidence.

The next four were private investigators charged in 2005 for illegal acquisition of confidential information. They were not convicted.

Then next five were private investigators also charged in 2005 for illegal acquisition of confidential information. All pleaded guilty or were otherwise convicted of breaching the Data Protection Act.

The next two were charged in 2005 with hacking into the phones of members of the Royal Household. Both pleaded guilty to the charges.

The next six, charged on 15 May 2012, were former News International CEO Rebekah Brooks, her husband, her personal assistant, her bodyguard, her chauffeur, and the head of security at News International. They were charged in relation to removal of documents and computers, allegedly to conceal them from investigating detectives. A seventh person, a former News International security guard, was charged relating to the same case on 12 September 2012. Two computers were found in a parking garage trash bin near Brook's home. These charges were made about 1 year after the Metropolitan Police Service reopened its dormant investigation into phone hacking, about 3 years after the then Assistant Commissioner of the Metropolitan Police Service told the Commons Culture, Media and Sport Committee that "no additional evidence has come to light," 5 years after News International executives began claiming that phone hacking was the work of a single "rogue reporter, 10 years after The Guardian began reporting that the Met had evidence of widespread illegal acquisition of confidential information, and 13 years after the Met began accumulating "boxloads" of that evidence but kept it unexamined in trash bags at Scotland Yard.

On 30 May 2012, Scotland police charged Andy Coulson with perjury relating to the trial of Tommy Sheridan held there in 2010 during the period Coulson was a senior adviser to Prime Minister David Cameron. In August 2012, Strathclyde police charged two additional former employees of News of the World, both former editors for the Scotland edition, with perjury relating to the same trial.

Another eight people, charged on 24 July 2012, were all former employees or agents of News of the World, and included head editors Rebekah Brooks and Andy Coulson, both of whom had already been charged with different crimes. Of the thirteen suspects that had been referred to the Crown Prosecution Service (CPS) by the Metropolitan Police Service for review, eight were charged with a total of nineteen charges, three that had worked for or contributed articles to News of the World were not to be pursued due to insufficient evidence (Terenia Taras, Raoul Simons, Ross Hall), and two were to continue to be investigated. Seven of the eight were "charged with conspiring to intercept communications without lawful authority from 3rd October 2000 to 9th August 2006." All eight were charged with illegal interception of communications relating to specific individuals.

In August 2012, additional files covering possible crimes were submitted to CPS by the Met for advice prior to making formal charges. The seven individuals including four journalists alleged to have been involved in wrongdoing, included one in relation to Operation Sacha under which Rebekah Brooks and others were charged, two members of the public in relation to money laundering under Operation Weeting, two in relation to alleged illegal payments to public officials including police officers under Operation Elveden, and the rest involving journalists and public officials in relation to misconduct in public office.

1. Neville Thurlbeck; (1999) journalist for News of the Worldcharged with allegedly bribing a police officer, Detective Con Farmer, to supply information on people whose details were kept on a confidential police computer. Tried in 2000 and acquitted when the judge directed the verdict due to lack of evidence.
2. Con Farmer; (1999) police officer charged on suspicion of taking a bribe to supply information on people whose details were kept on a confidential police computer. Tried in 2000 and acquitted when the judge directed the verdict due to lack of evidence.
3. Christopher Dawse (2005) private investigator charged but not convicted
4. Mark Maskell (2005) private investigator charged but not convicted
5. Andrew Lyle (2005) private investigator charged but not convicted
6. Paul Jones aka Taff Jones (2005) private investigator charged but not convicted
7. Steve Whittamore; (April 2005) Charged and pleaded guilty to breaching the Data Protection Act.
8. John Boyall; (April 2005) Charged and pleaded guilty to breaching the Data Protection Act.
9. Alan King; (April 2005) Charged and pleaded guilty to conspiracy to commit misconduct in a public office.
10. Paul Marshall; (April 2005) Charged and pleaded guilty to conspiracy to commit misconduct in a public office.
11. John Gunning; (~2005) Convicted of acquiring private subscriber information from British Telecom's database.
12. Clive Goodman; (2006) Charged with conspiracy to intercept communications without lawful authority of three members of the royal household including aides to Prince Harry, Prince William and the Prince of Wales. Pleaded guilty.
13. Glenn Mulcaire; (29 November 2006) Charged with conspiracy to intercept communications without lawful authority and to unlawful interception of communications. Pleaded guilty. Victims of his hacking included Sky Andrew, Max Clifford, Simon Hughes, Elle Macpherson, and Gordon Taylor. His plans to publish an exposé about his experiences were blocked because of his confidentiality agreement with News of the World.
14. Rebekah Brooks; (15 May 2012) former CEO of News International; charged with conspiracy to pervert the course of justice; one of six individuals charged on the same day with conspiracy and removal of documents and computers to conceal them from investigating detectives of Operation Weeting looking into phone-hacking.
15. Charles Patrick Evelyn Brooks; (15 May 2012) racehorse trainer, former columnist for The Daily Telegraph and husband of Rebekah Brooks; charged with conspiracy to pervert the course of justice through conspiracy and removal of documents and computers to conceal them from investigating detectives of Metropolitan police role in phone hacking scandal#Operation Weeting|Operation Weeting.
16. Mark Hanna; (15 May 2012) head of security for News International charged with conspiracy to pervert the course of justice through conspiracy and removal of documents and computers to conceal them from investigating detectives of Metropolitan police role in phone hacking scandal#Operation Weeting|Operation Weeting.
17. Cheryl Carter; (15 May 2012) personal assistant to Rebekah Brooks; charged with conspiracy to pervert the course of justice through conspiracy and removal of documents and computers to conceal them from investigating detectives of Metropolitan police role in phone hacking scandal#Operation Weeting|Operation Weeting.
18. Paul Edwards; (15 May 2012) chauffeur for Rebekah Brooks employed by News International charged with conspiracy to pervert the course of justice through conspiracy and removal of documents and computers to conceal them from investigating detectives of Metropolitan police role in phone hacking scandal#Operation Weeting|Operation Weeting.
19. Daryl Josling; (15 May 2012) security consultant for Rebekah Brooks employed by News International charged with conspiracy to pervert the course of justice through conspiracy and removal of documents and computers to conceal them from investigating detectives of Metropolitan police role in phone hacking scandal#Operation Weeting|Operation Weeting.
20. Andy Coulson; (30 May 2012) charged by Strathclyde Scotland police on suspicion of committing perjury before the high court in Glasgow during the 2010 trial of Tommy Sheridan at which Coulson denied having ever heard of Glenn Mulcaire and denied knowledge of phone hacking.
21. Rebekah Brooks; (24 July 2012) former CEO of News International; charged with conspiracy to intercept communications without lawful authority from 3 October 2000 to 9 August 2006 and charged relating to the voice mails of Milly Dowler and trade unionist Andrew Gilchrist.
22. Andy Coulson; (24 July 2012) former editor of News of the World; charged with conspiracy to intercept communications without lawful authority from 3 October 2000 to 9 August 2006 and charged relating to Milly Dowler, David Blunkett MP, Charles Clarke MP, and Calum Best.
23. Stuart Kuttner; (24 July 2012) former managing editor of the News of the World; charged with conspiracy to intercept communications without lawful authority from 3 October 2000 to 9 August 2006 and charged relating to Murder of Milly Dowler|Milly Dowler and David Blunkett MP.
24. Greg Miskiw; (24 July 2012) former news editor of News of the World; charged with conspiracy to intercept communications without lawful authority from 3 October 2000 to 9 August 2006 and charged relating to Murder of Milly Dowler|Milly Dowler, Sven-Göran Eriksson, Abigail Titmuss, John Leslie, Andrew Gilchrist, David Blunkett MP, Delia Smith, Charles Clarke MP, Jude Law, Sadie Frost, Sienna Miller, and Wayne Rooney .
25. Ian Edmondson; (24 July 2012) former news editor of News of the World; charged with conspiracy to intercept communications without lawful authority from 3 October 2000 to 9 August 2006 and charged relating to David Blunkett MP, Charles Clarke MP, Jude Law, Sadie Frost, Sienna Miller, Mark Oaten MP, Wayne Rooney, Calum Best, Tessa Jowell MP, David Mills, Deputy Prime Minister Lord Prescott, John Tulloch, Lord Frederick Windsor, Paul McCartney, and Heather Mills.
26. Neville Thurlbeck; (24 July 2012) former chief reporter of News of the World; charged with conspiracy to intercept communications without lawful authority from 3 October 2000 to 9 August 2006 and charged relating to Murder of Milly Dowler|Milly Dowler, Sven-Göran Eriksson, David Blunkett MP, Angelina Jolie, Brad Pitt, Mark Oaten MP, Tessa Jowell MP, and David Mills (lawyer)|David Mills.
27. James Weatherup; (24 July 2012) former assistant news editor of News of the World; charged with conspiracy to intercept communications without lawful authority from 3 October 2000 to 9 August 2006 and charged relating to Murder of Milly Dowler|Milly Dowler, Sven-Göran Eriksson, David Blunkett MP, Charles Clarke MP, Jude Law, Sadie Frost, Sienna Miller, Angelina Jolie, Brad Pitt, Wayne Rooney, Deputy Prime MinisterJohn Prescott|Lord Prescott, Paul McCartney, and Heather Mills.
28. Glenn Mulcaire; (24 July 2012) private investigator engaged by News of the World; charged relating to Murder of Milly Dowler|Milly Dowler, trade unionist Andrew Gilchrist, Charles Clarke MP, Delia Smith and Charles Clarke MP.
29. Wight, Douglas; (16 August 2012) charged by Strathclyde Scotland police with committing perjury before the high court in Glasgow during the 2010 trial of former MSP Tommy Sheridan and with multiple counts of conspiracy to hack telephones in breach of the Data Protection Act.
30. Bob Bird; (29 August 2012) charged by Strathclyde Scotland police with committing perjury before the high court in Glasgow during the 2010 trial of former MSP Tommy Sheridan and charged relating to phone hacking.
31. Lee Sandell; (12 September 2012) charged with perverting the course of justice by allegedly conspiring with Rebekah Brooks, Mark Hanna, Paul Edwards, Daryl Josling and others between 15 and 19 July 2011 to "conceal documents, computers and other electronic devices" from Metropolitan police officers. Operation Sacha, under which the evidence against Sandell was developed, is the investigation into allegations of perverting the course of justice.
32. April Casburn; (24 September 2012) Detective Chief Inspector at the Met charged with misconduct in public office for having allegedly contacted News of the World on 11 September 2010 offering to provide information while being a public officer, and acting as such, without reasonable excuse or justification. She was one of the Met's most senior counter-terrorism officers.

== Convictions ==
This is a chronological list of individuals that pleaded guilty or were convicted of illegally acquiring confidential information for the news media in conjunction with the phone hacking scandal. The list also includes those who pleaded guilty or were convicted of unrelated crimes if those individuals were at any time agents of or associated with others alleged to be involved with illegal acquisition of confidential information for news media. Dates in parentheses indicate approximately when convictions occurred.

Guilty of unrelated crimes but associated with individuals that may have illegally acquired confidential information

1. Duncan Hanrahan; (March 1999) One of Sid Fillery's police contacts for information. Pleaded guilty to conspiracy to rob, steal, supply drugs and pervert the course of justice.
2. Tom Kingston; (>1999) Detective Constable later private investigator who sold confidential information to Jonathon Rees. Convicted of theft of amphetamines.
3. Jonathan Rees; (December 2000) Police bug planted at Southern Investigations in 1999 heard "Rees routinely paying cash directly or indirectly to serving officers." Convicted of conspiracy to plant evidence. Sentenced to 7 years and served 5.
4. Sid Fillery; (2003) Rees's partner at Southern Investigations convicted of making indecent images of children.
5. Martin King; Former policeman jailed for corruption.
6. Austin Warnes, Detective constable jailed for conspiracy to pervert the course of justice by of conspiring with Jonathan Rees to plant evidence. Sentenced to 4 years.

Guilty of illegally acquiring confidential information

1. Steve Whittamore; (April 2005) Pleaded guilty to breaching the Data Protection Act.
2. John Boyall; (April 2005) Pleaded guilty to breaching the Data Protection Act.
3. Alan King; (April 2005) Pleaded guilty to conspiracy to commit misconduct in a public office.
4. Paul Marshall; (April 2005) Pleaded guilty to conspiracy to commit misconduct in a public office.
5. John Gunning; (~2005) Convicted of acquiring private subscriber information from British Telecom's database.
6. Clive Goodman; (29 November 2006) Pleaded guilty to conspiracy to intercept communications without lawful authority of three members of the royal household including aides to Prince Harry, Prince William and the Prince of Wales.
7. Glenn Mulcaire; (29 November 2006) Pleaded guilty to conspiracy to intercept communications without lawful authority and to unlawful interception of communications. Victims of his hacking included Sky Andrew, Max Clifford, Simon Hughes, Elle Macpherson, and Gordon Taylor. His plans to publish an exposé about his experiences were blocked because of his confidentiality agreement with News of the World.
8. Andy Coulson; (June 2014) Found guilty of a charge of conspiracy to intercept voicemails (phone-hacking). He was sentenced on 4 July 2014 to 18 months in prison.

== See also ==
- CTB v News Group Newspapers
- Metropolitan police role in phone hacking scandal
- Mosley v News Group Newspapers
- News media phone hacking scandal
- Operation Rubicon
- Operation Tuleta
- Phone hacking scandal reference lists
- Phreaking
- Sheridan v News Group Newspapers
- HM Advocate v Sheridan and Sheridan
