= List of people related to the News International phone hacking scandal =

The News International phone hacking scandal is a controversy involving the News of the World, a now-defunct British tabloid newspaper published by News International — a subsidiary of News Corporation — and the allegations that individuals working for the newspaper engaged in phone hacking, computer hacking, or corruption.

== Persons arrested ==
This table is a list of those who have been arrested by police in connection with the scandal and the current status of their bail. None of those listed below have been charged with any offence since their arrest and three individuals, Laura Elston, James Desborough and Bethany Usher, have been exonerated.

The barrister for the Metropolitan Police indicated to the Leveson Inquiry that the investigation into phone hacking and related matters is unlikely to be completed until September 2012.

Name	Position held	Date arrested	Date bailed to
Andy Coulson	NotW Editor (2003–07), Conservative Party Communications Director (2007–10), UK Government Director of Communications (2010–11)	8 July	Originally bailed to October, bail then extended to March 2012
Rebekah Brooks	NotW Editor (2000–03), Sun Editor (2003–09), Chief Executive News International (2009–11)	17 July	Originally bailed to October, bail then extended to March 2012
Stuart Kuttner	NotW Managing Editor (to 2009)	2 August and 30 August	Originally bailed to September, bail then extended 'until next year' (2012)
Greg Miskiw	NotW Assistant Editor, News (to 2005)	10 August	A date in October
Neil Wallis	NotW Executive Editor (to 2009)	14 July	Originally bailed to October, bail then extended to March 2012
James Desborough	NotW U.S. Editor	18 August	Exonerated of any wrongdoing by police in March 2012.
Glenn Mulcaire	Private Detective	April 2011 and 7 December	Bailed until 'late March' 2012
Laura Elston	Press Association Royal Reporter	27 June	Originally bailed to October but cancelled on 18 July when case dropped
Clive Goodman	NotW Royal Editor (to 2009)	8 July	Originally bailed to October, bail then extended 'until next year' (2012)
Terenia Taras	Freelance Journalist	23 July	Mid-October
Ian Edmondson	NotW News Editor (to 2011)	5 April	Bail extended to March 2012
James Weatherup	NotW Reporter	14 April	Originally bailed to September, bail then extended to March 2012
Dan Evans	NotW Features Reporter	19 August	A date in October
Neville Thurlbeck	Notw Chief Reporter (to 2011)	5 April	Originally bailed to September, bail then extended to March 2012. Refused to turn 'Queen's evidence' in November 2012.
Unnamed 63-year-old man	Described as 'a member of the public from Surrey'	8 July	Originally bailed to October, bail then extended 'until next year' (2012)
Police Officer #1	Metropolitan Police Service	-	-
Jamie Pyatt	Sun District Editor	4 November	Bailed until March 2012
Unnamed 52-year-old man	Arrested in Milton Keynes on suspicion of offences under the Computer Misuse Act	24 November	Bailed to 'early December'
Bethany Usher	Teesside University Journalism Lecturer, NotW Reporter (2006–2007)	30 November	Originally bailed to March 2012 but cancelled on 8 December when case dropped.
Lucy Panton	Ex-NotW Crime Editor	15 December	'A date in April'
Cheryl Carter	Ex-Executive PA to Mrs Brookes arrested at her home in Essex for attempting to pervert the course of justice	7 January 2012	'A date in January'

== Police ==
This table contains details of police officers who have featured prominently in the phone hacking scandal.

Name	Position	Police force	Involvement
Sir Paul Stephenson	Ex-Commissioner	Metropolitan Police	Resigned on 17 July after it was revealed he hired ex-NotW executive Neil Wallis as an adviser.
John Yates	Ex-Assistant Commissioner	Metropolitan Police	Resigned on 18 July following prolonged criticism of his handling of the initial phone hacking inquiry. Subsequently cleared of misconduct over his relationship with ex-NotW executive Neil Wallis.
Police Officer #1	Detective Constable	Metropolitan Police	Arrested on 19 August and suspended from work in relation to leaks from the police phone hacking investigation.
Sue Akers	Deputy Assistant Commissioner	Metropolitan Police	Currently leading the inquiry into phone hacking, corruption and related matters.
Mark Rowley	Chief Constable	Surrey Police	Confirmed that Surrey Police knew in April 2002 that Milly Dowler's voicemails had been accessed by the News of the World.
David Cook	Detective Chief Superintendent	Metropolitan Police	Is taking legal action against News International for making him a target of surveillance while he was investigating the murder of Daniel Morgan. Cook's wife - ex-police seargent and former BBC Crimewatch presenter Jacqui Hames - was also targeted for surveillance.
Dick Fedorcio	Director of Public Affairs	Metropolitan Police	Placed on extended leave on August 10 pending outcome of an IPCC investigation into his conduct relating to the hiring of ex-NotW executive Neil Wallis.

== Newspapers ==
Name	Position	Involvement
Matt Nixson	Ex-Sun Features Editor, Ex-NotW Features Editor	Dismissed by News International on 21 July for misconduct relating to his work at NotW. Police subsequently confirmed that Nixson would not be arrested or questioned as part of their investigation. Nixson subsequently brought a successful employment case against News International estimated by Press Gazette to have cost the company £1million
Alex Marunchak	Ex-NotW Irish Editor	On 9 September 2015 the Crown prosecution Service "concluded that there is insufficient evidence to provide a realistic prospect of conviction in respect of offences contrary to the Computer Misuse Act (for ‘computer hacking’ offences)." The CPS "... further determined that there is insufficient evidence to provide a realistic prospect of conviction for any associated or alternative offences." Accordingly the CPS "advised that no further action be taken in relation to this matter."
Colin Myler	NotW Editor (to 2011)	NotW's final editor.
Tom Crone	NotW Lawyer (to 2011)	It was reported in November that a parliamentary committee is likely to 'severely reprimand' Crone over his failure to fully answer questions about surveillance carried out by the News of the World.
Les Hinton	News International Chairman (to 2009), Wall Street Journal Publisher (to 2011)	Resigned from the Wall Street Journal in July 2011 saying that, while ignorant of hacking, he took responsibility.

== See also ==
- News media phone hacking scandal
- News International phone hacking scandal reference lists
