= Operation Golding =

Operation Golding is the codename that has been given to the ongoing investigation of alleged phone hacking at the newspapers published by Mirror Group Newspapers (part of Trinity Mirror plc), specifically the Daily Mirror and Sunday Mirror. The investigation flows from other investigations including Operation Weeting (which is looking into the affairs surrounding phone hacking at the News of the World) and Operation Elveden (which is looking into payments to police by journalists).

By February 2014, six former journalists have been interviewed as part of the investigation including Piers Morgan, former editor of the Daily Mirror, who was interviewed in February 2014.
