= Lucy Panton =

British journalist

Lucy Panton is a British journalist, a former News of the World crime editor, and the seventh person arrested under Operation Elveden on 15 December 2011.

== News of the World ==
Panton joined the News of the World in September 2002 from the Sunday People, taking up the position of crime correspondent. She was promoted to crime editor in October 2005.

On 30 October 2010, Panton was asked by News of the World news editor James Mellor to find out more from Metropolitan Police anti-terror head John Yates about the printer cartridge bomb found on a cargo plane at East Midlands Airport the previous day. Mellor wrote in an email to Panton:

John Yates could be crucial here. Have you spoken to him? Really need an excl (exclusive) splash (front page) line so time to call in all those bottles of champagne...

Panton replied: "Noted. Not got hold of him yet still trying." Panton was on maternity leave at the time of the closure of the newspaper in July 2011.

Panton was arrested at her home in Surrey. She was later released on police bail. that was enlarged over a 19 month period during the inquiry.

Her conviction of November 2014 was overturned after the Court of Appeal ruled on 31 March 2015 that Mr Justice Wide had misdirected the jury over the level of seriousness needed to make the charge stick. It was Panton’s successful appeal against an earlier conviction for conspiracy to commit misconduct in public office that led to the collapse of the Elveden cases. In the judgment, the lord chief justice, Lord Thomas, questioned the use of the 700-year-old common law offence to pursue journalists, and said the jury was misdirected. Public interest had to be considered before the actions of the journalists could be considered criminal, he said.

During his evidence to the Leveson Inquiry in March 2012, former Metropolitan Police anti-terror head John Yates admitted that he drank champagne with Panton and other executives from the tabloid newspaper. Yates denied that he gave Panton any favours in return for such hospitality, or that the relationship between the two was that close.
