= Jonathan Rees =

British private investigator

Jonathan Rees is a British private investigator, and former partner of murdered private investigator Daniel Morgan.

== Early life and career ==
Born in September 1954 in Doncaster, Yorkshire, Rees left school and joined the Merchant Navy, then became an investigator. In 1984, with partner Daniel Morgan, he set up a detective agency, Southern Investigations, in Thornton Heath, Surrey.

== Murder of Daniel Morgan ==
In April 1987, Rees was arrested on suspicion of the murder of Daniel Morgan but was released without charge.

Between Morgan's death in 1987 and 2008, five police inquiries were conducted, at a significant cost. There were allegations of police corruption, drug trafficking and robbery.

After an inquiry by Hampshire police in 1988, Rees and another man were charged with murder, but the case did not reach trial when charges were dropped because of a lack of evidence, and the Hampshire inquiry's 1989 report to the Police Complaints Authority found "no evidence whatsoever of police involvement in the murder".

In 1998, Metropolitan Police Deputy Assistant Commissioner Roy Clark conducted a third, secret, inquiry into the murder during which Southern Investigations' office was bugged by a known paid police informer. In December 2000, Rees was found guilty of conspiring to plant cocaine on an innocent woman in order to discredit her in a child custody battle and sentenced to seven years' imprisonment for attempting to pervert the course of justice.

After the Metropolitan Police Commissioner Sir Ian Blair declared that the first police inquiry—that had included Detective Sergeant Sid Fillery, stationed at Catford police station—was "compromised", a secret fifth inquiry began. Later, police arrested Jonathan Rees and several others on suspicion of murder, along with a serving police officer suspected of leaking information.

In 2009 the trial began at the Old Bailey. In March 2011 the Director of Public Prosecutions abandoned the case and the three accused were acquitted, including Rees.

The case involved some of the longest legal arguments submitted in a trial in the English criminal courts. Nicholas Hilliard QC, for the prosecution, said that defence lawyers might not be able to examine all the documents in the case (750,000 pages dating back over 24 years) in order to ensure a fair trial.

== 2011 News of the World scandal ==
After the collapse of the Old Bailey trial in March 2011 it was revealed that Rees had earned £150,000 a year from the News of the World for supplying illegally obtained information about people in the public eye.

After Rees completed his prison sentence for perverting the course of justice, he was hired again by the News of the World, at the time edited by Andy Coulson. Rees worked regularly on behalf of the Daily Mirror and the Sunday Mirror, as well as the News of the World, investigating the bank accounts of the royal family, and obtaining information on other public figures. He had a network of contacts with corrupt police officers, who obtained confidential records for him. He was routinely able to obtain confidential data from bank accounts, telephone records, car registration details and computers. He was also alleged to have commissioned burglaries on behalf of journalists.

In June 2011 The Guardian newspaper, calling for a public inquiry into the News of the World phone-hacking scandal, focused its criticism of the parent company News Corporation's handling of accusations of criminality within the organisation on the newspaper's use of Rees's investigative services. Rees's activities were described as a "devastating pattern of illegal behaviour", and far exceeding those of any of the other investigators commissioned by News Corporation who used illicit means to target prominent figures. They included unauthorised access to computer data and bank accounts, corruption of police officers and alleged commissioning of burglaries. The Guardian queried why the Metropolitan Police had chosen to exclude a very large quantity of Rees material from investigation by its Operation Weeting inquiry into phone hacking.

Following in excess of three years on bail, Rees and others were told all charges related to Operation Kalmyk and Operation Tuleta would be "no further actioned". This, in turn, focused attention on the credibility of Ian Hurst (Martin Ingram). The Guardian had published extensively on Rees's involvement with corrupt police officers and the procurement of confidential information for what Guardian journalist Nick Davies described as Rees's one "golden source" of income in particular, commissions from the News of the World. Davies has reported at length on what he described as the "empire of corruption" that Rees and Sid Fillery built in the years following Daniel Morgan's murder, after Fillery replaced Morgan as Rees's partner.

Rees is played by Andrew Whipp in the 2025 ITV drama about the hacking scandal, The Hack.

== Malicious prosecution case ==
In October 2014 Rees, along with others charged in 2009 and acquitted in 2011 (former Detective Sergeant Sid Fillery, brothers Glenn and Garry Vian, and builder James Cook) launched a £4 million malicious prosecution case against the Metropolitan Police. In February 2017 the High Court ruled on the lawsuit. Rees and the Vians lost their claim, but Fillery was awarded £25,000 in interim damages with a higher amount to be determined later. The Rees and Vians successful appeal was heard in 2018. In 2019 Rees and the Vians were awarded damages of £414,000 after winning the case against the Metropolitan Police.

== See also ==
- News media phone hacking scandal reference lists
- Metropolitan Police role in the news media phone hacking scandal
