= Paul McMullan (journalist) =

British journalist (born 1963)

- Born: 1963 (age 62–63)
- Education: Trinity School, Croydon; Cambridgeshire College of Arts and Technology; University of Lille
- Occupation: Tabloid journalist
- Spouse: Maria McMullan
- Children: 4

Paul McMullan (born 1963) is a British former tabloid journalist. He was educated at Trinity School, Croydon and Cambridgeshire College of Arts and Technology and the Université de Lille.

== Journalism career ==
McMullan started his newspaper career at the Newcastle Evening Chronicle, then the Rhondda Leader in Wales, before moving to London to work on the nationals. While shifting on The Sun and Today he briefly took a job as news editor of the Sunday Sport. He went on to work as a features journalist at the now-defunct News of the World between 1994 and 2001, briefly becoming deputy features editor in 2000.

In 2011, McMullan admitted to regrets over a series of articles he had written in the 1990s about Jennifer Elliott, the daughter of actor Denholm Elliott. McMullan had obtained information from the police that she had been living on the streets and working as a prostitute. She committed suicide in 2003. In an article in The New Yorker called Hack Work, Anthony Lane wrote the following about McMullan: "McMullan cuts exactly the figure that one would hope: the stained white suit, the tie askew, the despairing beard, the eruptive complexion, and the hair that no comb would dare engage. Yet, at present, he is perhaps the only player in this drama who speaks without a trace of caution — cheerfully confessing to what he hardly perceives as wrongs, and manfully struggling to grasp those moments when even he may have exceeded his brief", citing BBC Radio interview with McMullan about Elliott: "Yeah, I totally humiliated and destroyed her. It wasn't necessary, she didn't deserve it. She was having a bad time after her own dad had died. Yeah, I went a step too far. And it was based on a now criminal act, and so you gotta sometimes question, well, in some cases, criminal acts perpetrated by journalists aren't always justified. And in this case, not only was it not justified, it was downright wrong, I sincerely regret it, and, again, if there was anyone to apologise to, I would. But they're all dead."

In July 2011, the comedian Steve Coogan described him as "morally bankrupt" after appearing with him on BBC2's Newsnight. The actor Hugh Grant secretly taped him making claims about phone hacking in a visit to McMullan's pub, The Castle Inn in Dover. McMullan asked Grant during the conversation, "Are you taping me? If you are, good luck to you; I don't really care anyway." He was one of only a few journalists to claim on the record that phone hacking was rife at the newspaper. In November 2011 he made a notable contribution to the Leveson Inquiry where he not only confessed to a wide range of illegal activities in the pursuit of news but defended them as necessary. In his testimony he opposed the concept of privacy, despite claiming his own personal privacy being compromised, and that he had long disguised his personal whereabouts and circumstances, primarily by registering himself (for various purposes) at his parents' home address. McMullan notably told the enquiry that "Privacy is for paedos".

McMullan testified to having undertaken a wide range of illegal or unethical activities to get stories besides phone hacking: bribing police officers, stealing documents, going through celebrities' rubbish bins, and at one point posing as a "teenage rent boy" to entrap a paedophile priest. "[I]t was hard to think of any dubious news-gathering technique he had not confessed to," wrote New York Times reporter Sarah Lyall, "short of pistol-whipping sources for information." He defended those techniques as "perfectly acceptable ... if all we're trying to do is get at the truth."

"[Do] we really want to live in a world where the only people who can do the hacking are MI5 and MI6?" he asked. "For a brief period of about 20 years, we have actually lived in a free society where we can hack back". He scoffed at the very notion of privacy, calling it "the space bad people need to do bad things in." Lyall commented, "At times he sounded like a satirist's rendition of an amoral tabloid hack"."

More recently, McMullan has been a freelance journalist. He often worked in Kent with KOS Media titles, including the Kent on Sunday paper, which ceased publication in 2017.

== Pub owner and politician ==
McMullan owns several properties in Kent, giving his address as the Castle Inn, Dover, when appearing at the Leveson inquiry. In January 2011, McMullan became the landlord of The Bull public house in the village of Eastry for Punch Taverns. McMullan employed a bar manager to run the pub. After residents' complaints about noise from the pub he handed in his resignation as leaseholder. The bar manager took over and the pub was under investigation by Dover District Council and Kent Police before it closed completely.

McMullan owns and runs The Castle Inn, a public house near the Port of Dover, Kent. In August 2011, he tried to apply for a licence for topless barmaids in the pub. This was later refused.

As part of The Castle Inn, McMullan opened a low budget hostel called Dover Backpackers, providing accommodation in dormitory-style.

He stood as an independent in the 2013 Kent County Council elections for the Dover Town Ward. He originally wanted to stand as a UKIP candidate but was not supported by the party. He came third behind the Conservatives and Labour.

== Personal life ==
McMullan is the father of four children, the first two from his former marriage to former News of The World journalist Maria McMullan, and the two younger children are from a more recent relationship with a Kent local newspaper editor. McMullan is often filmed and interviewed at his pub by TV companies from all over the world including Turkey, India, Europe and Australia about phone hacking and journalism.

He has written a book about the News of the World phone hacking and other practices at the paper.
