= Richard Horton (blogger) =

Richard Horton (born 1964) is a retired Police Sergeant with Lancashire Constabulary, and former blogger who lives in Lancashire. He is the author of the Orwell Prize-winning anonymous blog NightJack which commented on his work as a police officer during his time as a Detective Constable.

== Blog ==
In May 2009, the still anonymous 'Jack Night' explained to The Independent why he had begun his blog in February 2008: "I wanted to write about where I think police reform has taken us in the 20 years that I have been in the force [...] because I don't think the changes are always good."

According to Paul Mason in April 2009, the anonymous blog's "value lies in the truthfulness of what's described and the honesty with which the author confronts his own reaction to events." Legal affairs writer David Allen Green wrote in April 2012 that: "NightJack was a perfect example of the value of blogging, providing a means — otherwise unavailable — by which an individual could inform and explain in the public interest."

== Controversy over identity ==
In a controversial and landmark decision in 2009, Mr Justice Eady refused to grant an order to protect the anonymity of Richard Horton. The judge ruled any right of privacy on the part of Horton would be likely to be outweighed by a countervailing public interest in revealing that a particular police officer had been making such contributions. In the case of evidence acquired by hacking, however, the applicable laws do not contain a public interest defence. That hacking was the means by which evidence had been acquired was not disclosed to the court.

This gave Patrick Foster, Media Correspondent of The Times, the opportunity to expose Horton's identity in the newspaper, leading to disciplinary procedures against Horton by his superior officers and the forced deletion of his blog. Legal scholars, Megan Richardson, Julian Thomas and Marc Trabsky have argued that Eady J's decision is important because it reveals the internet as a public space, and thus out of step with user's expectations of online privacy.

== The Times hacking controversy ==
In 2012, it was revealed that Patrick Foster, then a reporter at The Times, had used computer hacking to establish Richard Horton's identity. Horton's intention to sue The Times for damages was subsequently reported, and in October 2012 The Times settled with Horton for £42,500 plus costs.

On 29 August 2012, the police arrested Patrick Foster as part of Scotland Yard's Operation Tuleta investigation into computer hacking. Two years later, he was cautioned but the decision was made not to prosecute him.

In December 2013, Alastair Brett, former legal manager of The Times, was suspended from practising his profession for six months by the Solicitors Disciplinary Tribunal after they ruled that Brett had deliberately misled the High Court in Horton's application for an injunction. A disclosure that evidence of Horton's identity had been obtained by hacking his email address had not been made by Brett to counsel for either party or to Mr Justice Eady.
