= Fergus Shanahan =

British journalist

Fergus Shanahan (born 26 January 1955) is a British journalist. From 2007 he was Executive Editor of The Sun newspaper. In 2015 it was reported that Shanahan had left the newspaper after being cleared of authorising illegal payments to a public official.

== Early life and education ==
Shanahan was born in London. He attended Maidenhead Grammar School.

== Career ==
Shanahan began his career on the Reading Chronicle and Reading Evening Post. He worked as a sub-editor for the Mirror Group, The Times and Express Newspapers. He joined The Sun in 1989, working as a Night Editor before being appointed Deputy Editor in 2000. He was deputy to David Yelland 2000 - 2003 and Rebekah Brooks (nee Wade) 2003 - 2007. He was also a political columnist on The Sun 2004 – 2008.

On 28 January 2012 The Daily Telegraph and BBC reported that Shanahan was arrested as part of the Operation Elveden police inquiry into allegations of improper payments by journalists to public officials. The inquiry is connected to the News International phone hacking scandal. In July 2013 he pleaded not guilty; on 20 March 2015 Shanahan was cleared of charges that he had signed off illegal payments.

== Personal ==
Shanahan is married with two daughters. He lives in Essex.
