= Blue chip hacking scandal =

The United Kingdom's Serious Organised Crime Agency (SOCA) investigated the use of corrupt private investigators by British 'blue chip' companies in 2008. In one of five investigations reviewed by SOCA, 102 organisations and individuals involved were identified. The investigators specialised in illegally obtaining private data from banks, utility companies and HM Revenue and Customs. The list of 102 names has been given to the Home Affairs Select Committee that is investigating private investigators. SOCA is refusing to allow the select committee to publish the names on the list, and together with the Metropolitan Police, has stressed that none of the names are believed to have acted illegally.

== Firms involved ==
102 companies in 22 different sectors were named on the list given by SOCA to the Home Affairs Select Committee. Many of the names on the list were uncovered as a result of Operation Millipede, a SOCA investigation into blagging and hacking. SOCA is preventing the committee from naming the individual companies, but has allowed the naming of some of the sectors that the companies are in. These include:

- Accountancy firms
- Auditors
- Food service companies
- Car rental agencies
- Construction companies
- Financial services companies
- Insurance companies
- Insurance businesses
- Law firms
- Management consultancies
- Oil companies
- Rail firms
- Venture capitalists

The individual companies have not been told by SOCA that they have been identified. The largest sector identified are law firms, twenty two appear on the list. SOCA and the Metropolitan Police are not alleging that the individuals or companies on the list have or may have committed criminal offences. In addition, the Metropolitan Police is checking the list against its own current investigation, they will inform the select committee when their investigation is complete.

There is an additional list of 200 names held by the Metropolitan Police. Graham Freeman, a hacker who was jailed as a result of SOCA's Operation Millipede said that 80 per cent of his clients were blue-chip companies and high-profile individuals, with the rest connected to the media. Freeman said that SOCA's list was a "Pandoras box", which could lead to the imprisonment of dozens of bankers, lawyers and boardroom executives.

== Home Affairs Select Committee ==
Members of Parliament on the Home Affairs Select Committee, under chairman Keith Vaz, are examining claims that the companies used private investigators to engage in industrial espionage. The list given to the committee by SOCA has been marked as confidential, SOCA have demanded the list be ‘kept in a safe in a locked room, within a secure building and that the document should not be left unattended on a desk at any time'. SOCA has refused to allow the MPs to release the list. Trevor Pearce, the director-general of SOCA, met Keith Vaz, the chairman of the Home Affairs Select Committee, in Parliament and asked him not to publish the information as the material would be handed to the Information Commissioner to pursue in civil actions. A decision on whether to release the names will be taken when the committee publishes its report into private investigators. Vaz said that "the list has been around for a number of years and nobody has done anything about it...It is in the public interest for the information to be available at the appropriate time, not for this saga to drag on.“

Following the resignation of Ian Andrews, the head of SOCA, Vaz said that he would write to Andrews's successor to ask if they would review the decision not to release the list. Four other historic police inquiries included in the SOCA file have not been passed to the MPs on the committee. A fellow committee member, James Clappison, wrote to the Commissioner of the Metropolitan Police, Bernard Hogan-Howe, to ask him for names of the companies and individuals who had hired corrupt private investigators. Clappison wrote there was “...a public interest in knowing as much about the circumstances of these operations as can be properly disclosed”. A Metropolitan Police investigation from 2007, Operation Barbatus, was later included in the suppressed SOCA report. Barbatus had found that private investigators were hacking computers and corrupting police officers, two detectives had been jailed after they tried to access the New York Stock Exchange unlawfully.

The select committee has been given a breakdown of companies by sector on the list. The companies include 21 law firms, nine companies in the insurance sector, four food service companies, an oil firm and a pharmaceutical company. Vaz later wrote to the heads of various British regulatory bodies to ask for clarification over their guidelines on the usage of private investigators. Vaz said that “The context in which the companies implicated by Soca’s information have acted is crucial for us to understand their motives.” The bodies contacted included the Association of the British Pharmaceutical Industry, the Law Society, the Office of Fair Trading, the Office of Rail Regulation and the Financial Conduct Authority.

SOCA refuses to name the clients involved in Operation Millipede as it believes it could disrupt the ongoing Operation Tuleta, an operation into computer hacking and criminal activity by the Metropolitan Police. Tuleta will conclude at the end of 2015 and SOCA asked the committee to suppress the names until they have been addressed by the Information Commissioner at the end of Tuleta. Five companies on the list are being investigated by detectives working on Operation Tuleta. SOCA said that there was no proof the clients acted illegally. None of the clients of the company, Active Investigation Services, were successfully prosecuted.

The director general of SOCA, Trevor Pearce, and Metropolitan Police Commander Neil Basu issued a joint statement to the Home Affairs Select Committee on 12 July 2013 that claimed SOCA had provided the Metropolitan police with “full access” to computers seized years earlier from the corrupt private investigators. Vaz later said that it was "not the case" that the Metropolitan Police had been given full access to all material held by SOCA. Basu wrote to Vaz to tell him that his officers had only recently been given the list 102 blue-chip companies, on 30 July.

== Ian Andrews ==
The chairman of SOCA, Ian Andrews, resigned in August 2013, following his failure to declare his ownership of Abis Partnership Ltd, a management consultancy company that he owned with his wife, Moira. His wife is additionally the head lawyer of a consultancy firm, Good Governance Group (G3). Andrews did not believe that failing to declare his wife's job at G3 was a conflict of interest, but said that his decision not to disclose his own interest in his own company was "inexcusable".

Andrews had earlier referred himself to the Independent Police Complaints Commission (IPCC) after he was accused of misleading Parliament. Andrews had been confronted by a former British Army intelligence officer, Ian Hurst, who was "enraged" after Andrews told MPs on the Home Affairs Select Committee that he was “absolutely satisfied” that SOCA had not previously provided false testimony to the committee. Hurst was hacked by private investigators identified by SOCA in 2006 but was only informed in 2011.

Hurst's computer had been unlawfully accessed by corrupt private investigators and he emailed Andrews to tell him that he was “frankly astonished” at his evidence. SOCA did not respond to Hurst but the IPCC later contacted him to tell him that SOCA had referred the case to them. IPCC later had to send Hurst's complaint back to SOCA as they had “no jurisdiction” over Andrews's actions.
