= Sue Akers =

British police officer

Susan Penelope Akers CBE QPM (born 1957) is a retired Deputy Assistant Commissioner of the British Metropolitan Police Service.

She joined the force in 1976 and was promoted by the Metropolitan Police Authority from the rank of Chief Superintendent to Commander in 2004. The posts she held also included Head of Organised Crime & Criminal Networks in the Specialist Crime Directorate.

She led Operation Weeting, a British police investigation into allegations of phone hacking in the News International phone hacking scandal, from January 2011. In July 2011, as the result of documents submitted to Operation Weeting, she took on the leadership of a related investigation, Operation Elveden. She led Operation Tuleta, a 2011–12 investigation into illegal access of private computers. Akers led police inquiries into the potential involvement of intelligence services in relation to detainees held abroad.

Akers retired at the end of 2012.

She was awarded the Queen's Police Medal in 2007 and was appointed Commander of the Order of the British Empire (CBE) in the 2013 Birthday Honours for services to policing.

Akers' role as a private investigator in the case of alleged rape of a schoolgirl in 2016 has been questioned. Employed by the family of the child, it was reported in The Daily Telegraph that Akers was "said to have had a number of meetings with serving officers about the case and tried to tell officers how to conduct the case. William Clegg QC, defending, also said she had asked to have access to court papers. The officer leading the investigation [...] agreed that it was 'unique' for a former Deputy Assistant Commissioner to be involved in that way."

She is played by Rebecca Front in the 2025 ITV drama about the News International phone hacking scandal, The Hack.
