= Operation Weeting =

2011–15 British police investigation

Operation Weeting was a British police investigation that commenced on 26 January 2011, under the Specialist Crime Directorate of the Metropolitan Police Service into allegations of phone hacking in the News of the World phone hacking affair. The operation was conducted alongside Operation Elveden, an investigation into allegations of inappropriate payments to the police by those involved with phone hacking, and Operation Tuleta, an investigation into alleged computer hacking for the News of the World. All three operations are led by Deputy Assistant Commissioner Sue Akers, Head of Organised Crime & Criminal Networks within the Specialist Crime Directorate.

== Background ==
In August 2006, the News of the World's royal editor, Clive Goodman and a private investigator, Glenn Mulcaire, were arrested by the Metropolitan Police, and later charged with hacking the telephones of members of the royal family by accessing voicemail messages, an offence under section 79 of the Regulation of Investigatory Powers Act 2000. On 26 January 2007, both Goodman and Mulcaire pleaded guilty to the charges and were sentenced to four and six months imprisonment respectively. On the same day, it was announced that Andy Coulson had resigned as editor of the News of the World. In 2007, that appeared to be the end of the News of the World royal phone hacking scandal.

In July 2009, The Guardian newspaper published a series of allegations that a culture of phone hacking went far beyond the single case of Goodman and Mulcaire's hacking of the royal household. It was alleged that a much wider range of people across different areas of public life, including the former deputy prime minister John Prescott, the Manchester United manager Alex Ferguson, politicians Tessa Jowell and Boris Johnson, publicist Max Clifford and even Rebekah Brooks, then editor of the News of the World's sister paper The Sun, had been the victim of hacking ordered by the News of the World. The News of the World and its parent News Corporation strongly denied the allegations, and called on The Guardian to share any evidence it had with the police. In the wake of the allegations, the Commissioner of the Metropolitan Police Sir Paul Stephenson asked the force's Assistant Commissioner John Yates to review the original 2006 investigation in the light of any new evidence, with regards to potentially reopening the investigation. In a single 8-hour meeting, Yates decided not to take any further action.

In the wake of the police deciding not to instigate legal proceedings, several public figures who had allegedly been hacked began litigation proceedings against the News of the World's owner News International, and against the private investigator Glenn Mulcaire. Those who began legal action included the football agent Sky Andrew, actress Sienna Miller, actor Steve Coogan, television presenter Chris Tarrant and football pundit Andy Gray. Respect politician George Galloway, who was not an MP at the time, stated that the Metropolitan Police told him they had evidence he was among those targeted by Mulcaire.

In the course of one of these litigation proceedings, that brought by Sienna Miller, papers lodged in the High Court suggested that Ian Edmondson, a senior editor at the News of the World, was involved in work undertaken by Mulcaire. In the wake of this new evidence, News International group general manager Will Lewis was tasked with reviewing any documents relating to the 2006 Goodman case within the company's records and files. This review led Lewis to also re-examine all documents held by the legal firm Harbottle & Lewis, who had defended News International against an unfair dismissal case brought by Clive Goodman in 2007, in which he discovered questionable material. Lewis passed this material to a second legal firm, Hickman Rose, who in turn asked the former Director of Public Prosecutions Ken Macdonald to examine the evidence and report his findings to the News International board. Macdonald's report found evidence of indirect hacking, breaches of national security and serious crime, which led Macdonald to recommend that the company immediately refer the matter to the police; News International did.

The Crown Prosecution Service announced an immediate review of the evidence collected during the Metropolitan Police's original investigation into phone hacking at the News of the World, before the Metropolitan Police announced on 26 January 2011 that it was launching Operation Weeting, a new and fresh investigation into the entire phone hacking affair.

== Scope ==
In its initial months of existence, Operation Weeting had around 45 officers working on it. In a report to Parliament on 20 July 2011, the Home Affairs Select Committee of the House of Commons recommended that additional resources be made available to the operation in order to speed up its progress; later the same day, the Metropolitan Police announced that the number of officers assigned to Weeting was to be increased to its current level of 60. On 6 February 2012, DAC Akers appeared at the Leveson Inquiry and said that there were a total of 90 police officers working on Operation Weeting.

It is believed that around 3,000 people may have had their phones hacked, a figure that was confirmed by DAC Akers at an evidence session of the Home Affairs Select Committee on 12 July 2011. At the same evidence session, Akers confirmed the police had contacted only 170 of the 3,870 people named in Glenn Mulcaire's files to date. There were 11,000 pages of the evidence with 5,000 landline phone numbers and 4,000 mobile phone numbers. on them inside the so-called "Glenn Mulcaire files". At the Leveson Inquiry on 6 February 2012, it was confirmed by Robert Jay QC that there are 6,349 potential victims of phone hacking. He also said that in Mulcaire's notes there were 4,375 names with phone numbers alongside. DAC Akers said that there are 829 "likely" victims.

During the investigations, documentation provided to Operation Weeting suggested that some police personnel may have accepted "inappropriate payments" from news organisations in return for classified information. As a result, the Metropolitan Police Service opened an additional investigation, Operation Elveden, which is also being led by Deputy Assistant Commissioner Akers.

== Arrests ==
By 13 March 2012, 23 people had been arrested as part of Operation Weeting. The sequence of arrests was as follows:

- Neville Thurlbeck [A], News of the World chief reporter. Thurlbeck was arrested on 5 April 2011 on suspicion of conspiring to intercept communications, contrary to Section 1 (1) of the Criminal Law Act 1977, and unlawful interception of voicemail messages, contrary to Section 1 of the Regulation of Investigatory Powers Act (RIPA) 2000. Thurlbeck was released on bail later the same day, and is due to return in September.
- Ian Edmondson [B], former News of the World news editor. Edmondson was arrested on 5 April 2011 on suspicion of conspiring to intercept communications, contrary to Section 1 (1) of the Criminal Law Act 1977, and unlawful interception of voicemail messages, contrary to Section 1 of the Regulation of Investigatory Powers Act (RIPA) 2000. He was released on bail later the same day, and is due to return in September.
- James Weatherup [C], a News of the World assistant news editor. Weatherup was arrested on 14 April 2011 on suspicion of conspiring to intercept communications, contrary to Section 1 (1) of the Criminal Law Act 1977, and unlawful interception of voicemail messages, contrary to Section 1 of the Regulation of Investigatory Powers Act (RIPA) 2000. Weatherup was bailed later the same day, and is due to return in September.
- Terenia Taras, freelance journalist. Taras was arrested and bailed on 23 June 2011 on suspicion of conspiring to intercept communications, contrary to Section 1 (1) of the Criminal Law Act 1977. She is due to report back to a police station in October.
- Laura Elston [E], a Press Association royal correspondent. Elston was arrested on 27 June 2011 on suspicion of intercepting communications, contrary to Section 1 of the Regulation of Investigatory Powers Act (RIPA) 2000, before being bailed to return in October. Elston's bail was cancelled on 18 July when she was informed that no further action would be taken against her.
- Andy Coulson, a former News of the World editor and former Downing Street Communications Director. Coulson was arrested on 8 July 2011 on suspicion of conspiring to intercept communications, contrary to Section 1 (1) of the Criminal Law Act 1977, and of corruption, contrary to Section 1 of the Prevention of Corruption Act 1906. Coulson was released on bail later the same day, and is due to return to police in October.
- Clive Goodman, a former News of the World royal editor who had previously been jailed in January 2007 for intercepting voicemail messages of members of the royal household. Goodman was arrested on 8 July 2011 on suspicion of corruption, contrary to Section 1 of the Prevention of Corruption Act 1906. He was bailed on the same day, and is scheduled to return in October.
- An unidentified 63-year-old man who was arrested on 8 July 2011 on suspicion of corruption, contrary to Section 1 of the Prevention of Corruption Act 1906. He was bailed the following day, and is due to return in October.
- Neil Wallis, a former News of the World deputy editor. Wallis was arrested on 14 July 2011 on suspicion of conspiring to intercept communications, contrary to Section 1 (1) of the Criminal Law Act 1977. He was bailed on the same day to return in November.
- Rebekah Brooks, News International chief executive and former News of the World editor. Brooks was arrested on 17 July 2011 on suspicion of conspiring to intercept communications, contrary to Section 1 (1) of the Criminal Law Act 1977, and of corruption, contrary to Section 1 of the Prevention of Corruption Act 1906. She was bailed that evening until October.
- Stuart Kuttner, former News of the World managing editor. Kuttner was arrested on 2 August 2011 on suspicion of corruption, contrary to Section 1 of the Prevention of Corruption Act 1906 and on suspicion of conspiring to intercept communications, contrary to Section 1 (1) of the Criminal Law Act 1977. He was initially released under police bail until the end of the month but was taken into custody again on 30 August and bailed until an unspecified date in September.
- Greg Miskiw, former News of the World news desk editor. Miskiw was arrested on 10 August 2011 on suspicion of corruption, contrary to Section 1 of the Prevention of Corruption Act 1906 and on suspicion of conspiring to intercept communications, contrary to Section 1 (1) of the Criminal Law Act 1977. He was bailed the following day to return in October.
- James Desborough, News of the World US editor. Desborough was arrested on 18 August 2011.
- A 35-year-old man believed to be Dan Evans, a former reporter for News of the World, was arrested on 19 August 2011.
- A 30-year-old man, whom The Guardian identified as Ross Hall, a former reporter for News of the World who wrote under the pen name of Ross Hindley, was arrested on 2 September 2011. He was bailed the same day to return in mid-January 2012.
- A 35-year-old man was arrested in an early morning raid on 7 September 2011 on suspicion of conspiring to intercept communications, contrary to Section 1 (1) of the Criminal Law Act 1977. He was bailed the same day until an unspecified date in October. The BBC identified the man as Raoul Simons, a journalist who worked for the Evening Standard and later as the deputy football editor of The Times.
- A 31-year-old woman was arrested on 30 November 2011 on suspicion of conspiring to intercept communications, contrary to the Criminal Law Act 1977. The media identified her as Bethany Usher, a former journalist at News of the World and The People. On 8 December 2011 the police announced that they would take no further action against the woman.
- A 41-year-old man was arrested on 7 December 2011 "on suspicion of conspiring to intercept voicemail messages, contrary to Section 1 (1) Criminal Law Act 1977 and on suspicion of perverting the course of justice contrary to common law." Media sources have identified him as the private investigator Glenn Mulcaire.
- Six more arrests were made on 13 March 2012. News reports have stated that the arrested include the former News of the World editor Rebekah Brooks.
- Tom Crone, who had been Legal Affairs manager for News International, was arrested on 30 August 2012. He was arrested on suspicion of conspiring to intercept communications and was taken to a local police station for questioning.

== Independent review ==
On 15 September 2011, the newly appointed Commissioner of the Metropolitan police, Bernard Hogan-Howe, announced that he had requested that Durham police carry out an independent review of the evidence collected by Operation Weeting. Hogan-Howe said that he had asked the team, led by Durham chief constable Jon Stoddart, "to have a look at the inquiry to reassure us we are going in the right direction and I think we are."

== Charges ==
On 23 July 2012, the Crown Prosecution Service (CPS) announced that charges would be brought against eight people in relation to phone hacking. According to press reports, the list of the eight individuals to be charged was as follows: Rebekah Brooks, Andy Coulson, Stuart Kuttner, Glenn Mulcaire, Greg Miskiw, Ian Edmondson, Neville Thurlbeck and James Weatherup.

== 2013 arrests ==
A new round of arrests was made in early 2013, with the arrest of six former News of the World journalists on 13 February, bringing the total number of people arrested as part of Operation Weeting to 32.

On 14 March 2013, officers from Operation Weeting made a series of arrests. BBC News reported that those arrested were journalists that were or had been associated with Mirror Group Newspapers. The Guardian reported that those arrested were, or had been, associated with the Sunday Mirror, Sunday People, and The People newspapers.

== Closure ==
In November 2015 the CPS announced the closure of Operation Weeting and Operation Golding an associated investigation focussing on possible phone hacking by journalists at the Mirror group.The Director of Public Prosecutions, Alison Saunders stated that there was "insufficient evidence to provide a realistic prospect of a conviction", whether for corporate liability at News Group Newspapers or for the ten journalists working for the Mirror Group.

== See also ==
- Metropolitan police role in phone hacking scandal
- News media phone hacking scandal
- Operation Elveden
- Operation Kalmyk
- Operation Motorman (ICO investigation)
- Operation Rubicon
- Operation Tuleta
- Phone hacking scandal reference lists
