= Operation Kalmyk =

In February 2012, during evidence to the Leveson Inquiry into the culture, practice and ethics of the British press, Metropolitan Police Deputy Assistant Commissioner Sue Akers mentioned the existence of Operation Kalmyk, a new investigation related to Operation Tuleta. The investigation is in relation to access to computers.

According to DAC Akers, one person has been arrested as part of the investigation.

On 20 February 2012, The Guardian reported that Philip Campbell Smith was understood to be under investigation by Operation Kalmyk. It is alleged that Smith hacked the computer of Ian Hurst, a former British army intelligence non commissioned officer, "in 2006 as part of a commission from the News of the World". Hurst said that Smith worked for Jonathan Rees, a private investigator, "who was in turn working for the News of the World". Hurst also said that police "missed a number of opportunities to investigate".

In a BBC Panorama programme broadcast last year, taped confessions by Smith that he had hacked Hurst's computer were played. The Guardian reported that the allegations in this programme were being investigated by Operation Kalmyk. On 9 September 2015 all charges against Jonathan Rees, Philip Campbell Smith, Graham Freeman and Stephen (Sid) Creasey were dropped.

== See also ==
- Metropolitan police role in phone hacking scandal
- News media phone hacking scandal
- News International phone hacking scandal
- Operation Tuleta
- Phone hacking scandal reference lists
