= News media phone hacking scandal reference lists =

The news media phone hacking scandal is a controversy over illegal acquisition of confidential information by news media organizations that reportedly occurred in the United Kingdom, the United States and Australia between 1995 and 2011. This article includes reference lists for various topics relating to that scandal.

== Overview and topics ==
These lists are organized according to the topics shown below in blue type.

By 2002, the practice of publications using private investigators to acquire confidential information was widespread, with some individuals using illegal methods. Victims of these illegal methods included celebrities, politicians, law enforcement officials, solicitors, and ordinary citizens. As this illegal activity became apparent, arrests were made and some convictions achieved. Upon learning their privacy had been violated, some victims retained solicitors and filed suit against news media companies and their agents, in some cases receiving financial payments for violation of privacy. Successful suits and publicity from investigative news articles led to further disclosures, including the names of more victims, more documentary evidence of wrongdoing, admissions of wrongdoing, and potentially related payments. Allegations were made of poor judgement and cover up by news media executives and law enforcement officials. As a result, new investigations were initiated and several senior executives and police officials resigned. There were also significant commercial consequences of the scandal.

Individuals included on these lists are reportedly involved as victims, perpetrators, investigators, solicitors, or responsible oversight officials in the phone hacking scandal. Illegal acquisition of information was allegedly accomplished by accessing private voicemail accounts, hacking into computers, making false statements to officials to obtain confidential information, entrapment, blackmail, burglaries, theft of mobile phones and making payments to officials in exchange for confidential information. The kind of information acquired illegally may have include private communication, physical location of individuals, bank account records, medical records, phone bills, tax files, and organizational strategies.

There is evidence that illegal acquisition of confidential information continued at least into 2010. Solicitors representing victims were targeted for surveillance by news organizations being sued as recently as 2011.

For narrative regarding the background and status of this scandal, see also:

News media phone hacking scandal
News International phone hacking scandal
News Corporation scandal

== Victims ==
For narrative on some of the individuals included on the list of victims below, see their Wikipedia pages and:

List of victims of the News International phone hacking scandal
News International phone hacking scandal – victims, apologies, compensation, arrests

== Surveillance targets ==
These are lists of individuals who were targeted for surveillance beyond simple phone hacking by news media organizations. Some were targeted simply to acquire information for developing a story but others were vocal critics of news media companies and may have been targeted to obtain information with which to influence criminal investigations, civil suits, and Parliamentary hearings.

=== Critics of news media organizations ===
This list includes a serving police officer, two solicitors with clients suing News International, and a Member of Parliament. Dates in parentheses indicate the approximate date that surveillance was initiated.

1. Cook, David; (June 2002) While investigating Jonathan Rees and Sid Fillery in connection with the 1987 murder of Daniel Morgan, Metropolitan Police detective chief superintendent Cook reportedly became a surveillance target of Glenn Mulcaire, who was working for News of the World. Fillery reportedly used his relationship with Alex Marunchak at News of the World to arrange for Mulcaire to obtain Cook's home address, his internal payroll number at the Metropolitan police, his date of birth and figures for the amount that he and his wife were paying for their mortgage. Surveillance of Cook is also reported to have involved physically following him and his young children, attempts to access his voicemail and that of his wife, and possibly attempts to send a "Trojan horse" email in an attempt to steal information from his computer. Documents reportedly in the possession of the Scotland Yard shows that "Mulcaire did this on the instructions of Greg Miskiw, the paper's assistant editor and a close friend of Marunchak." Attempts also appear to have been made to open letters which had been left in Cook's external postbox, indicating a "possible attempt to pervert the course of justice." Rebekah Brooks, then editor for News of the World, was aware of the surveillance.
2. Watson, Tom; (September 2009) Watson had been at odds with News International since 2006, when he quit as Government Minister and signed a letter demanding that Tony Blair resign as Prime Minister. Rebekah Brooks, then editor of News International's The Sun, reportedly stated she would not forgive him for this and that she would pursue Watson for the rest of his life. Watson found himself targeted, with strangers going through his rubbish and harassing his family. As a member of the Culture, Media and Sport Select Committee, he confronted News International executives with critical observations and probing questions. While the Committee was holding hearings leading to a formal report on phone hacking, three as yet unnamed News International executives arranged for Watson to be put under surveillance by private investigator and former policeman, Derek Webb.
3. Lewis, Mark; (May 2010) While Lewis was representing claimants against News of the World for phone hacking, its parent company, News International, hired Derek Webb to put Lewis and his family under surveillance. This was reportedly part of an attempt to gather evidence for false smears about his private life and thereby interfere with his ability to represent clients. The attempt to discredit the solicitors may also have been intended to protect the reputation of Andy Coulson, formerly editor of News of the World who subsequently became head of communications for the Conservative Party and senior media adviser to Prime Minister David Cameron. A dossier including video taken of his ex-wife and daughter was given to Tom Crone, the senior legal manager at News International. James Murdoch was executive chairman of the company at the time. Lewis told the Leveson Inquiry that "News International sought to destroy my life, and very nearly succeeded."
4. Harris, Charlotte; (January 2011) Like Mark Lewis, Harris also came under surveillance by an agent of News International while representing clients suing the company in relation to phone hacking by News of the World." Her pursuit of evidence for her clients led to disclosure of information that reportedly resulted in the firing of Ian Edmondson from News of the World and the resignation of the prime minister's media adviser, Andy Coulson. Also like Lewis, both she and her family were followed and video-taped, with a dossier given to News International's Tom Crone. The private investigator, Derek Webb, was asked to establish that Harris was having an affair with someone it turned out that she had never met. Over the years, News International had engaged Webb to target more than 90 people.

=== Other surveillance targets ===
In November 2011, Channel 4 News disclosed a list of 153 people upon whom private investigator Derek Webb was reportedly asked by the News of the World to carry out surveillance between 2003 and 2011. Listed below are celebrities, politicians and other public figures. Excluded from the list are those who seem to be ordinary members of the public.

- Ainsley Harriott
- Alan Johnson MP
- Alan Shearer
- Alan Titchmarsh
- Alex Ferguson
- Amie Buck
- Andy Gray
- Angelina Jolie
- Anna Fazackerley
- Ashley Cole
- Ben Freeman
- Benjamin Mwarawairi
- Beverley Turner
- Bob Crow
- Boris Johnson
- Charles Clarke MP
- Charles Kennedy
- Charlotte Harris
- Chelsy Davy
- Chris Coleman
- Chris Huhne
- Chris Tarrant
- Clare Short
- Connie Fisher
- Daniel Radcliffe and his parents
- Danny Cipriani
- David Beckham
- David Blunkett
- David Miliband
- Delia Smith
- Derek Draper
- Dirk Kuyt
- Duke of Westminster
- Earl Spencer
- Elle Macpherson
- Eric Joyce MP
- Fernando Torres
- Frank Bruno
- Frank Lampard
- Gabby Logan
- Gary Glitter
- Gary Lineker
- Geoff Hoon
- George Michael
- Gloria De Piero
- Gordon Ramsay
- Gordon Taylor
- Grace Ononiwu
- Grant Bovey
- Harriet Harman
- Heather Mills
- Hilary Perrin
- Ian Wright
- Jackiey Budden
- James Cracknell
- Jane Goldman
- Jessie Wallace
- Joanne Armstrong
- John Motson
- John Terry
- Johnny Vaughan
- José Mourinho
- Justine Greening
- Kevin Pietersen
- Kimberley Fortier
- Lee Chapman
- Leslie Grantham
- Lord Coe
- Lord Goldsmith
- Lord Irvine
- Lord Macdonald
- Lulu
- Mark Bosnich
- Maxine Carr
- Michelle Lineker
- Mike Hancock
- Ms. Dynamite
- Nigella Lawson
- Paul Burrell
- Paul McCartney
- Paul Ross
- Peaches Geldof
- Peter Andre
- Peter Kenyon
- Phil Woolas
- Phillip Schofield
- Pollyanna Woodward
- Prince Harry
- Prince William
- Richard Hammond
- Richard Madeley
- Rik Mayall
- Rio Ferdinand
- Ronan Keating
- Rosie Reid
- Shabana Mahmood
- Shahid Malik
- Shalimar Wimble
- Sienna Miller
- Simon Cowell
- Simon Hoggart
- Simon Jordan
- Sophie Anderton
- Stephen Twigg
- Steve Arnold
- Steve McFadden
- Sue Cleaver
- Ted Terry
- Tom Watson MP
- Tony Pulis
- Tony Richardson
- Trevor McDonald
- Vanya Seager
- Zoe Williams

== Solicitors ==
This is an alphabetical list of solicitors involved in the phone hacking scandal.

=== Alleged victims of phone hacking ===
The list of alleged victims of phone hacking includes some solicitors. The Law Society noted that it would be a serious offence if this hacking was done with the intention of affecting judicial outcomes.

1. Kirsty Brimelow; prominent criminal barrister who has represented clients in rape and murder trials.
2. Harris, Charlotte; solicitor representing alleged victims of phone hacking
3. Lewis, Mark; solicitor representing as many as 70 alleged victims of phone hacking including Milly Dowler's family
4. Stephens, Mark; solicitor whose clients have included James Hewitt, who allegedly had an affair with Princess Diana, and WikiLeaks founder Julian Assange.
5. Winskell, Robin; sports attorney who has represented prominent footballers in disciplinary trials, FIFA arbritrations, and libel cases.

=== Representing victims of illegal acquisition of confidential information ===
1. Tamsin Allen;
2. Charlotte Harris; Partner at the London law firm Mishcon de Reya who represented Max Clifford, who received £400,000 from News of the World. misrepresented as advanced payment for stories. They also paid Harris's costs. Harris has gone on to act for numerous individuals with hacking claims.
3. Steven Heffer, Partner and Head of Media & Privacy at London law firm Collyer Bristow LLP, who acted for about 80 victims.
4. Mark Lewis; As solicitor for the Professional Footballers' Association in 2005, Lewis realized that News of the World was using phone hacking as the basis for a story concerning Gordon Taylor. In 2008, Lewis became the first solicitor to bring a claim for a client relating to phone hacking and went on to win a settlement from the newspaper for phone hacking. Taylor received £700,000. While represent clients against News International, the company hired a private investigator to put Lewis and his family under surveillance. Lewis lost his position at George Davies Solicitors L.L.P because the firm did not want to be involved in his suits. In 2011 Lewis acted for the family of Milly Dowler achieving a record £3 million deal. He joined Taylor Hampton Solicitors in London. Lewis has represented about 100 claimants against the News of the World and other newspapers and has explored filing phone hacking suits in the US.
5. Gerald Shamash;
6. David Sherborne;
7. Mark Stephens; partner at the London law firm Finers Stephens Innocent representing 11 tranche 1 claimants, all of which settled pre-trial. He is reportedly representing a dozen claimants in tranche 2.
8. Mark Thomson; among others, represented Siobhain McDonagh MP in relation to invasion of privacy allegedly associated with attempts by agents of The Sun to break codes necessary to access information on her stolen mobile phone.
9. Hugh Tomlinson; QC Barrister, advised the high court around September 2012 that 395 people had applied for disclosure of phone-hacking evidence from the Met, that 124 phone-hacking claims had been accepted by the News International compensation fund, and that something under 300 new claims would be forthcoming.
10. Chris Waters, Head of Dispute Resolution at London Law Firm Malletts represents Former Boxing World Champion Chris Eubank and ex-wife Karron Stephen-Martin in News International Hacking Claims. Waters also acts for numerous other victims in claims against News International.

In 2011 a group was formed for the Claimant's solicitors. In addition to Harris and Lewis, several solicitors brought claims including Tamsin Allen, Mark Thomson and Gerald Shamash. Allen was the Claimant Group's first co-ordinator, Thomson took over after Allen settled her claims. There were several other solicitors involved in the group, including Mark Stephens.

=== Otherwise involved in phone hacking scandal ===
1. Lawrence Abramson; As solicitor at Harbottle & Lewis, Abramson sent a letter 29 May 2007 stating H&L's review of emails provided by News International did not indicate involvement in phone hacking by other than Clive Goodman. This letter was subsequently used by News International executives to maintain that Goodman was a single "rogue reporter." When Lord Kenneth Macdonald reviewed the emails again in July 2011, he reported "evidence of serious criminal offences" including payments to police.
2. Pike, Julian; Partner at Farrer & Co; represented the News Group Newspapers subsidiary of News International during the 2008 settlement negotiations leading to payment of £425,000 plus costs to Gordon Taylor. Pike told the Culture, Media and Sport Committee on 19 October 2011 that he had informed News International of evidence suggesting "a powerful case" could be made that three News of the World journalists had illegally accessed confidential information. News International maintained through 2009 that only Clive Goodman had been involved. Pike also told the Committee that Colin Myler met with James Murdoch on 27 May 2008, after Pike had received a copy of the new evidence which had been emailed by Tom Crone to Myler. This meeting was in addition to Myler's meeting with Murdoch and Crone 10 June 2008. Pike had not reported earlier that senior News International personnel had misled Parliament because of professional obligations to his client. Farrer & Co. also represents Queen Elizabeth II. In 2011, Pike advised News International that Mark Lewis and Charlotte Harris should be put under surveillance while they were representing clients suing the company. As a result, both of them and their families were followed and video-taped. Pike continued to characterize this apparent attempt to find information with which to discredit opposing solicitors as "unusual" but "justified" and "would do it again tomorrow," even after News International acknowledged that it was "deeply inappropriate." Farrer & Co. also wrote to Lewis threatening to enjoin him from accepting more clients that wanted to sue News of the World over phone hacking. Pike also discussed the possibility with News International's legal affairs manager, Tom Crone, of making charges of professional misconduct against Lewis and Harris. Lewis told the Leveson Inquiry that "News International sought to destroy my life, and very nearly succeeded."

== Publications mentioned in the ICO report ==
This is a list of newspapers and magazines listed in the Information Commissioner's Office (ICO) report of May 2006 titled What Price Privacy?. The publications are listed in order of the number of pieces of data each paid a private investigator for.

This report presented what had been learned from the ICO investigation named Operation Motorman, which was begun in 2002. "Information Commissioner Richard Thomas ... revealed that hundreds of journalists may have illegally bought private information and named a list of newspapers and magazines using one particular information agency... Numerous invoices [were found] addressed to newspapers and magazines which detailed prices for providing the journalists with personal information ... Here is the table listing the [name of the publication] followed by number of pieces of data paid for and the number of journalists involved."

=== Publications ===
1. Daily Mail: 952; 58 .
2. Sunday People: 802; 50.
3. Daily Mirror: 681; 45.
4. The Mail on Sunday: 266; 33.
5. News of the World: 182; 19.
6. Sunday Mirror: 143; 25.
7. Best Magazine: 134; 20.
8. Evening Standard: 130; 1.
9. The Observer: 103; 4 .
10. Daily Sport: 62; 4.
11. The Sunday Times: 52; 7.
12. The People: 37; 19.
13. Daily Express: 36; 7.
14. Weekend Magazine (Daily Mail): 30; 4.
15. Sunday Express: 29; 8.
16. The Sun: 24; 4.
17. Closer Magazine: 22; 5.
18. Sunday Sport'15; 1.
19. Night and Day (Mail on Sunday): 9; 2.
20. Sunday Business News: 8; 1.
21. Daily Record: 7; 2.
22. Saturday Express: 7; 1.
23. Sunday Mirror Magazine: 6; 1.
24. Real Magazine: 4; 1.
25. Woman's Own: 4; 2.
26. Daily Mirror Magazine: 3; 2 .
27. Mail in Ireland: 3, 1.
28. Daily Star: 2; 4.
29. Marie Claire: 2; 1.
30. Personal Magazine: 1; 1.

=== Publishers ===
1. Associated Newspapers; publisher of the Daily Mail
2. Express Newspapers; publisher of the Daily Star and Daily Express
3. Guardian News & Media; publisher of The Guardian and The Observer
4. Mirror Group Newspapers (MGN); publisher of the Daily Mirror and the Sunday Mirror
5. News International; publisher of The Sun, The Times and the News of the World
6. Telegraph Media Group; publisher of the Telegraph and Sunday Telegraph

== Individuals acknowledging that confidential information was acquired illegally ==
Sean Hoare claimed he was encouraged by Andy Coulson, editor of News of the World to hack phones.

This is a chronological list of individuals that acknowledged acquiring confidential information illegally themselves or, from first-hand experience, alleged the practice was widespread by news media companies. Dates in parentheses indicates approximately when each individual made the admission.

As of 15 December 2010, The Guardian reported that more than 20 journalists who worked for News of the World had told The Guardian, The New York Times or Channel 4's Dispatches that "illegal activity assisted by private investigators was commonplace and well known to executives, including Andy Coulson." Coulson has denied having knowledge of phone hacking while he was editor at News of the World.

Individuals acknowledging that they illegally acquired confidential information

1. Steve Whittamore; (April 2005) private investigator
2. John Boyael; (April 2005) private investigator
3. Alan King; (April 2005) retired police officer civilian communications officer
4. Paul Marshall; (April 2005)
5. Leigh, David; (2006) assistant editor for The Guardian
6. Clive Goodman; (2007) royal correspondent for News of the World
7. Glenn Mulcaire; (2007) private investigator
8. Sean Hoare; (September 2010) entertainment journalist for The Sun and for News of the World
9. Paul McMullan; (September 2010) senior journalist for News of the World

Individuals alleging that illegal acquisition of confidential information was widespread

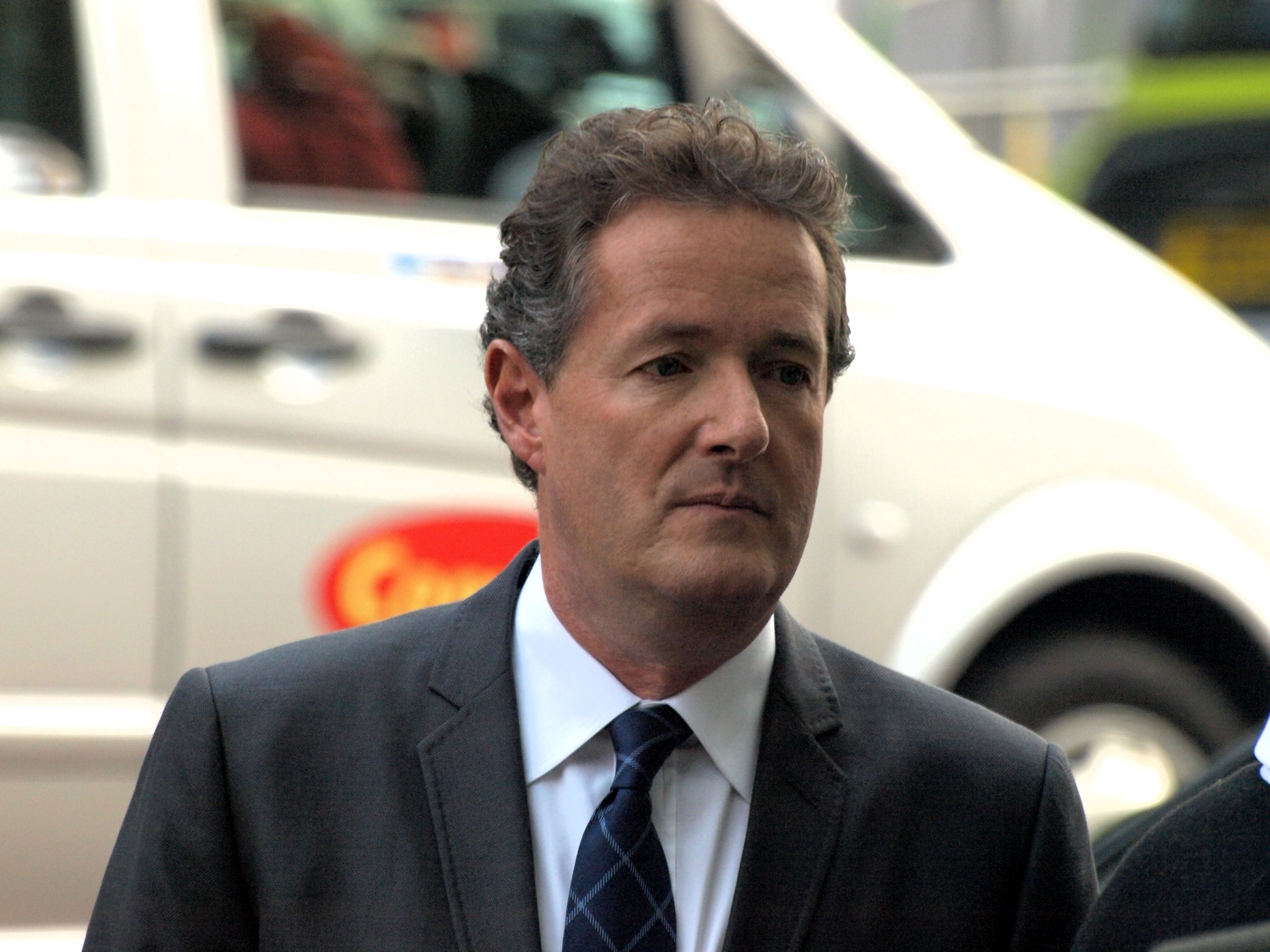
In 2007 Piers Morgan asserted that phone hacking was common practice. "Loads of newspaper journalists were doing it. Clive Goodman, the News of the World reporter, has been made the scapegoat for a widespread practice."

1. Piers Morgan; (2007) former editor of the Daily Mirror, former editor of the News of the World, and former show business editor of the Sun stated that "loads of newspaper journalists were doing it. Clive Goodman, the News of the World reporter, has been made the scapegoat for a widespread practice."
2. David Brown; (2007) former reporter for The People who alleged that "reporters on the publisher's Sunday newspaper regularly used phone hacking to get information in the first half of the last decade." The Trinity Mirror which publishes the Mirror and Sunday Mirror, called the claims unsubstantiated allegations of a disgruntled, dismissed employee.
3. Andrew Neil; former editor of The Sunday Times and former writer for the Daily Mail; Claimed that phone hacking "was systemic throughout the News of the World, and to a lesser extent The Sun."
4. Sharon Marshall; (2010) entertainment journalist, formerly TV editor for News of the World and contributor to The Sun. "Author of the book 'Tabloid Girl' said hacking was widespread at News of the World and other tabloids." "Sharon Marshall is named as having witnessed hacking when working under Coulson from 2002–2004. "It was an industry-wide thing," she said."
5. James Hipwell; (18 July 2011) former business journalist at the Daily Mirror
6. [unnamed Sunday Mirror sources]; (23 July 2011) claims "techniques were routine, and that they were being used at the news desk, and by designated reporters, virtually every day."
7. [unnamed New York Times sources]; "A dozen former reporters said in interviews that hacking was pervasive at News of the World. "Everyone knew," one longtime reporter said. 'The office cat knew'...Andy Coulson talked freely with colleagues about the dark arts, including hacking. 'I've been to dozens if not hundreds of meetings with Andy' when the subject came up, said [a] former editor... When Coulson would ask where a story came from, editors would reply, 'We've pulled the phone records' or 'I've listened to the phone messages.'

== Individuals who worked for both News International and the police ==
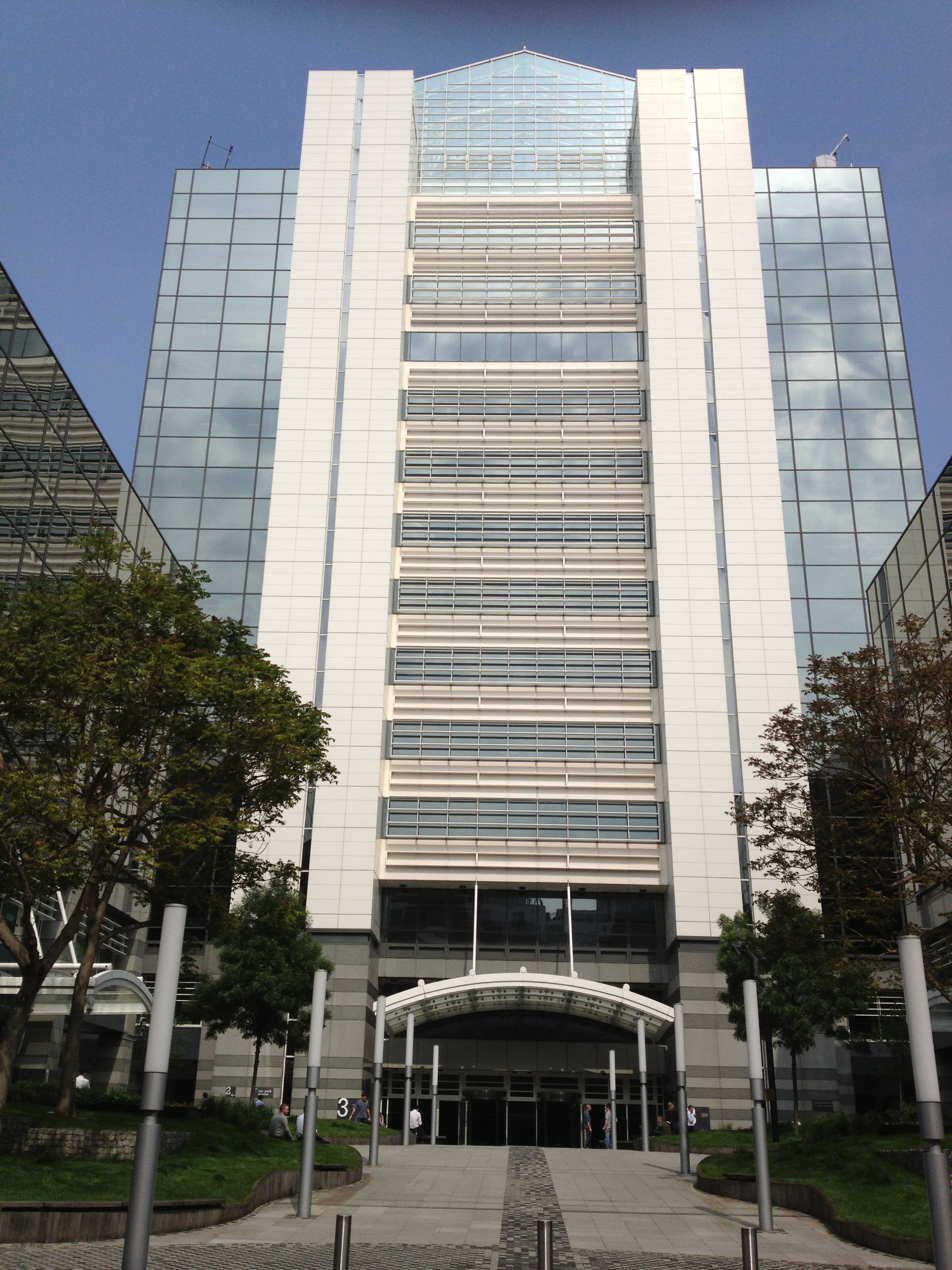
By mid-2012 formal charges had been filed against many News International journalists and executives, including former chief executive Rebekah Brooks.

This is an alphabetical list of individuals who at various times worked for both News International and the Metropolitan Police Service.

1. Andy Hayman was with the Essex Police from 1978 until 1998, when he transferred to the Metropolitan Police Service. He became Chief Constable for the Norfolk Constabulary in 2002 but returned to the Met in February 2005. Hayman was in charge of the Royal Household/Goodman Inquiry in 2006. He resigned from the Met in December 2007 during an investigation of reportedly lavish entertainment expenditures for "long lunches and dinners with News of the World journalists at a time when the newspaper was under investigation for phone hacking." Two months later he was hired by News International, where he wrote an article for The Times defending the police investigation he led, maintaining that there were "perhaps a handful" of hacking victims.
2. Alex Marunchak worked as a freelance Ukrainian language interpreter for the Metropolitan Police Service between 1980 and 2000 while he was also an executive for News of the World, where he worked from 1981 to 2006. He provide "interpretation and translation services for victims, witnesses and suspects of crime who do not speak English." Marunchak was a regular customer of private investigator Jonathan Rees, who was reportedly purchasing information from improper sources. No evidence became public that Marunchak or other journalists had committed criminal offences or that they were aware of how Rees acquired the information. Marunchak reportedly arranged for Glenn Mulcaire, then doing work for News of the World, to conduct surveillance on the detective investigating Rees and his partner, Sid Fillery, for murder.
3. John Stevens, Baron Stevens of Kirkwhelpington was Met commissioner from 2000 to 2005. He has been credited with reopening communication between the news media and the police after his predecessor, Sir Paul Condon had all but closed it down in the mid-1990s with his anti-corruption drive at Scotland Yard. After retiring, he wrote a column for the News of the World. In his autobiography, he stated that he had "worked hard to foster good relations with newspapers and had made himself 'available' to editors including Rebekah Brooks (then Wade) at The Sun and Andy Coulson, then at the News of the World." His diary, which may record meetings between him and News International executives between February 2000 to January 2005, went missing but was found in October 2011 at New Scotland Yard. In March 2011, he was chairman of security firm Axiom International.
4. Neil Wallis worked for News International from 1987 to 1998 and again from 2003 to 2009. He then started his own public relations firm, Chamy Media, which provided "strategic communication advice and support" to the Met on a part-time basis from October 2009 to September 2010. Wallis's firm was paid £24,000 by the Met at the same time Wallis received more than £25,000 from News International for providing "crime exclusives" using details of Met investigations. Wallis was arrested in July 2011 on suspicion of conspiring to intercept communications Also in July, the Independent Police Complaints Commission began an Inquiry into "whether John Yates used his position to help get Wallis's daughter a job at Scotland Yard.

== Investigations ==
For narrative regarding some of the investigations on this list, see also articles for specific Metropolitan Police operations and:

Metropolitan Police role in the news media phone hacking scandal
2009–2011 News of the World phone hacking scandal investigations
News International phone hacking scandal- UK investigations
News International phone hacking scandal- Renewed investigations

== Attempted suicides ==
On 6 March 2012, Reuters reported that two senior journalists working for The Sun, a newspaper owned by News International, appeared to have attempted suicide in the face of ongoing investigations relating to the phone hacking scandal. At that time, eleven current and former staff members of The Sun had been arrested on suspicion of bribing police or civil servants for information.

Public outrage over hacking Milly Dowler's voice mail resulted in loss of advertising to News of the World, leading to its being shut down after 168 years.

== Arrests ==
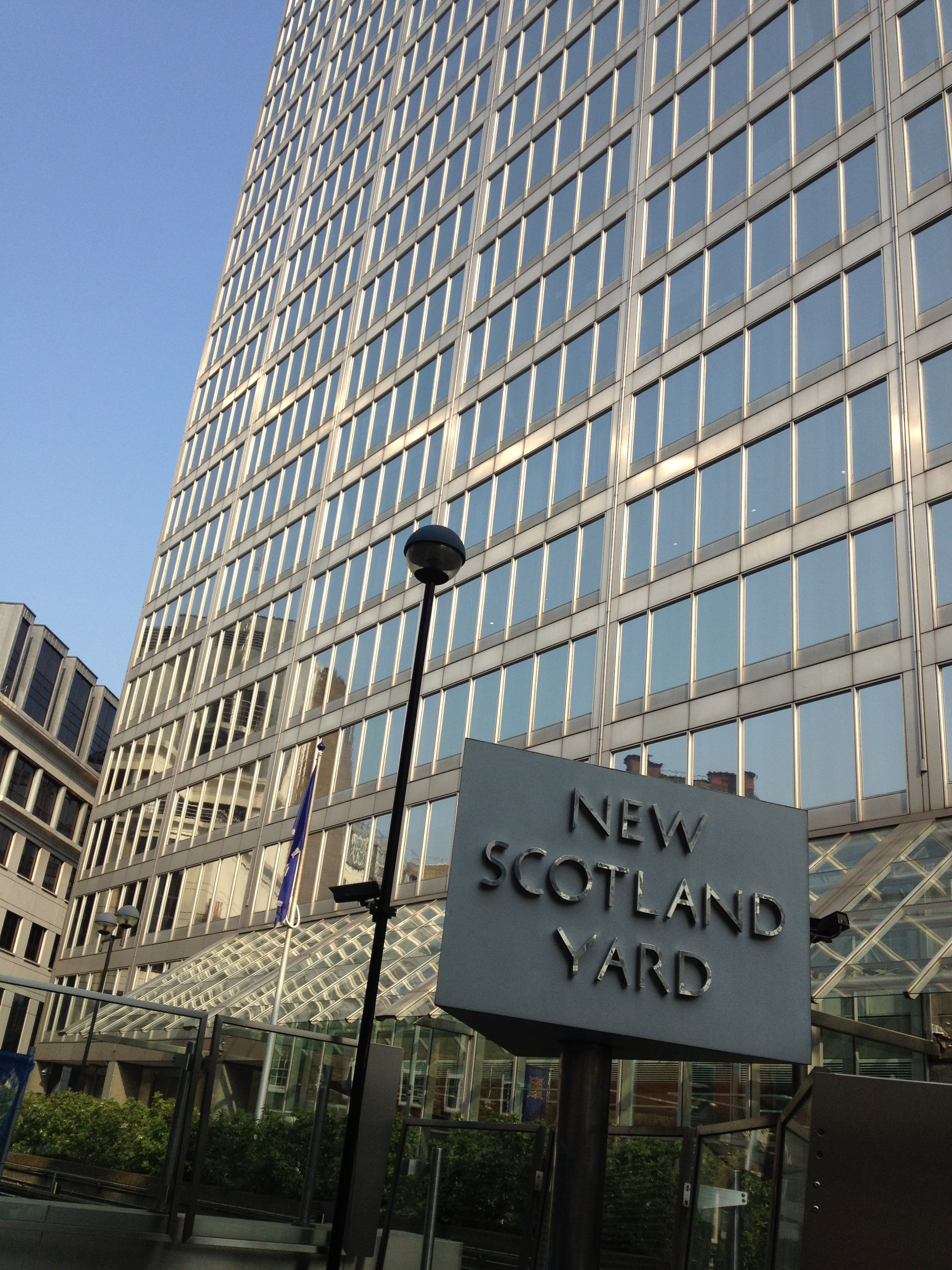
Renewed Investigations by Scotland Yard in 2011 led to dozens of arrests for activities related to the phone hacking scandal.

For additional narrative regarding some of the arrests on this list, see also:

News International phone hacking scandal- Further arrests

== See also ==
- List of people related to the News International phone hacking scandal
- Metropolitan Police role in the news media phone hacking scandal
- 2009–2011 News of the World phone hacking scandal investigations
- News of the World royal phone hacking scandal
- Operation Elveden
- Operation Kalmyk
- Operation Rubicon
- Operation Tuleta
- Operation Weeting

=== Wikipedia articles with timelines ===
1. Metropolitan police role in phone hacking scandal – Timeline
2. News International phone hacking scandal – Timeline
3. Timeline of the News Corporation scandal
