= Stuart Kuttner =

Newspaper editor

- Born: 1939 or 1940 (age 85–86)
- Occupation: Newspaper editor

Stuart Kuttner (born 1939 or 1940) is a former newspaper editor. He worked as the news editor for the London Evening Standard before joining the News of the World newspaper in 1980 first as a deputy editor, then as managing editor. He held the position for 22 years before stepping down from his post in 2009 and retiring to Woodford Green. He was arrested on 2 August 2011, in connection with the News International phone hacking scandal, but has now been acquitted. He was 71 at the time of his arrest.

== Sarah's Law ==
Kuttner was closely involved with the campaign for Sarah's Law. It was for this work that he and a colleague were awarded the "team of the year" prize at the 2002 British Press Awards. Upon leaving the News of the World he stated that he would continue to work with the paper on "specialised projects" including campaigning for parents to be able to find out if registered sex offenders are resident in their area.

== Arrest ==
Kuttner was arrested by appointment on 2 August 2011 by officers involved in Operation Weeting on suspicion of corruption, contrary to Section 1 of the Prevention of Corruption Act 1906 and on suspicion of conspiring to intercept communications, contrary to Section 1 (1) of the Criminal Law Act 1977, the same charges as had been laid against former News of the World editor Rebekah Brooks just over two weeks earlier. He was initially released under police bail until the end of the month but was taken into custody again on 30 August and bailed until an unspecified date in September. On 24 July 2012, he was formally charged with conspiracy to intercept communications between 3 October 2000 to 9 August 2006 without lawful authority regarding communications of Milly Dowler and David Blunkett, MP. Since police renewed investigations in 2011, 90 people have been arrested and 16 formally charged with crimes, including Kuttner, in conjunction with illegal acquisition of confidential information.

His trial started in October 2013, and in June 2014 he was found not guilty. The former archbishop of Canterbury, George Carey, had defended him in court, saying "Stuart was and is a good man. He is a man of integrity ... He is a man whose Jewish ethics went through his life and echoed mine as a deeply Christian ethic."

On 15 October 2014, Kuttner lost his bid to recover the legal fees he had incurred as a result of being a co-defendant in the phone-hacking trial. Mr Justice Saunders said he was satisfied that the conduct of Kuttner and his co-defendant, Charlie Brooks, had "brought suspicion on themselves and misled the prosecution into thinking that the case against them was stronger than it was".

He is played by Pip Torrens in the 2025 ITV drama about the phone hacking scandal, The Hack.

== See also ==
- News media phone hacking scandal
- News International phone hacking scandal
- Phone hacking scandal reference lists
- Metropolitan police role in phone hacking scandal
