= Operation Elveden =

2010s British police operation

Operation Elveden was a British police investigation into allegations of inappropriate payments to police officers and other public officials. It was opened as a result of documents provided by News International to the Operation Weeting investigation.

== Background ==
Operation Elveden was an investigation into allegations of inappropriate payments to police and public officials. It was supervised by the Independent Police Complaints Commission.

The investigation was led by Deputy Assistant Commissioner Sue Akers of the Metropolitan Police Service, who also led Operation Weeting and Operation Tuleta. The service's Directorate of Professional Standards was also involved in the investigation. The Elveden suspects were given numbers to identify them.

On 6 February 2012, DAC Akers appeared at the Leveson Inquiry and said that there were 40 police officers and staff working on Operation Elveden, but that this number would be increased to 61 officers as a result of the investigation into The Sun.

== Arrests ==
As of 10 January 2012 nine arrests had been made. These include a journalist working for News International, arrested and taken to a south west London police station on 4 November 2011. He was later identified by the media as Jamie Pyatt of The Sun. Later that same month, the BBC reported that five more arrests had been made, four journalists and a policeman, bringing the total number of arrests to 14. The following month, the BBC reported that eight people, including five Sun employees, had been arrested by police regarding allegations of corrupt payments to police and public officials. The Guardian and Daily Telegraph reported that they included The Sun's deputy editor Geoff Webster, and its chief foreign correspondent and picture editor.

According to the BBC, several other serving police officers and one retired police officer were also arrested in May, August, and September 2012.

On 17 January 2013, the BBC reported that three more people, two police officers and a third man understood to be the Sun journalist Anthony France, had been arrested early that morning. According to the Guardian, these arrests brought the total of those arrested to 56, of whom 22 were Sun journalists.

Another police officer was arrested on 12 February 2013, bringing the total number arrested to 60, according to Sky News.

A former Surrey policeman was arrested on 24 April 2013, the 62nd arrest in connection with the investigation.

By the time the operation ended in February 2016, a total of 90 arrests had been made.

== Announcements regarding charges ==
On 20 November 2012, news sources reported that the Crown Prosecution Service had announced a series of charges would be brought against five individuals in relation to Operation Elveden.

Those reported as having been named in relation to these charges included Rebekah Brooks, Andy Coulson, John Kay and Clive Goodman.

On 5 June 2013, the Crown Prosecution Service dropped charges against Sun defence editor Virginia Wheeler on health grounds. The police officer, Paul Flattley, accused of receiving payments from her had pleaded guilty to conspiring to commit misconduct in public office and was sentenced to two years imprisonment.

== Convictions ==
These include:

1. Casburn, April: a Detective Chief Inspector of the National Terrorist Financial Investigation Unit, Counter Terrorism Command, at the Metropolitan Police, 53 from Essex. Arrested 24 September 2012, and charged with misconduct in public office for having allegedly contacted News of the World on 11 September 2010 offering to provide information while being a public officer, and acting as such, without reasonable excuse or justification. She was one of the Met's most senior counter-terrorism officers. Found guilty at Southwark Crown Court on 10 January 2013, of offering to sell inside information on the phone-hacking probe to the News of the World. On 1 February 2013 April Casburn was sentenced to 15 months imprisonment.
2. Flattley, Paul: police officer pleaded guilty to conspiring to commit misconduct in public office and was sentenced to two years imprisonment. He had provided information to newspapers, including on the security arrangements for Kate Middleton.
3. Chapman, Scott: a Prison officer, was found guilty on Wednesday 5 November 2014 of conspiracy to commit misconduct in public office. He was found to have made up to £40,000 by selling information about Jon Venables, one of the murderers of toddler James Bulger, to journalists. Chapman was told by Judge Charles Wide that his jail term would be counted in years rather than months.
4. Gaffney, Lynn: The ex-partner of Scott Chapman (see above), Gaffney was also found guilty on 5 November 2014 of conspiracy to commit misconduct in public office; some of the payments from journalists were paid into her bank account.
5. A former News of the World journalist who had made the payments to Scott Chapman (see above) was also convicted on 7 November 2014 of the same charge; at the time of his conviction he could not be named for legal reasons.
6. PC Timothy Edwards: an anti-terrorism police officer based at Heathrow Airport, pleaded guilty to misconduct in a public office and was given a two-year jail sentence in 2014.
7. Anthony France: a reporter for The Sun, was found guilty of aiding and abetting misconduct in a public office between 2008 and 2011. He had paid a total of more than £22,000 to PC Timothy Edwards (see above). The jury at France's trial was not informed that PC Edwards had already pleaded guilty and been gaoled. This conviction was quashed on 27 October 2016.
8. Quinn, Simon: A former police officer jailed for 18 months in 2015. He had been found guilty of leaking information about murder inquiries to journalists, including details of the investigation into the death of Milly Dowler.
9. Bettina Jordan-Barber: John Kay's source at the Ministry of Defence, to whom The Sun paid money. She was jailed for 12 months in January for misconduct in public office.

== Acquittals ==
On 20 March 2015, four Sun journalists were cleared of paying public officials for stories after a trial at the Old Bailey. Ex-chief reporter John Kay and ex-royal editor Duncan Larcombe successfully argued that their contact with two military sources had been in the public interest, whilst former deputy editors Fergus Shanahan and Geoff Webster were cleared of charges that they had signed off illegal payments. The trial heard that £100,000 was paid to a Ministry of Defence official, who had earlier pleaded guilty to charges of conspiring to commit misconduct in a public office and was jailed in January 2015. Reporting restrictions had suppressed this information until the conclusion of the Sun journalists' trial. A fifth defendant, former colour sergeant John Hardy, was found not guilty of misconduct in a public office. He had allegedly been paid nearly £24,000 for providing Larcombe with information on 34 occasions; the court heard that these had included stories relating to Prince William and Prince Harry. Hardy's wife Claire, who had been accused of collecting illegal payments for her husband, was cleared of aiding and abetting him.

== End of Operation Elveden ==
Operation Elveden officially ended on 26 February 2016, almost five years after it was launched. In total it was responsible for the conviction of 34 criminals, including nine police officers and two journalists. Between them they had made or received payments of more than £300,000 in exchange for confidential information, according to the Metropolitan Police.

== See also ==
- Metropolitan police role in phone hacking scandal
- News media phone hacking scandal
- Operation Kalmyk
- Operation Motorman (ICO investigation)
- Operation Rubicon
- Phone hacking scandal reference lists
