= Operation Tuleta =

British police investigation

Operation Tuleta is a British police investigation by the Metropolitan Police Service into allegations of computer hacking, related to the News International phone hacking scandal.

As of June 2011, it was reported to have six officers working for it. According to a report in the London Evening Standard, Operation Tuleta was at that time a "scoping exercise" prior to a possible full investigation.

On 29 July 2011, Channel 4 News reported a statement from the Metropolitan Police: "Some aspects of this operation will move forward to a formal investigation. There will be a new team reporting to DAC Sue Akers". This followed a statement given to Channel 4 News by former army intelligence corporal Ian Hurst (a.k.a. Martin Ingram): "Police officers working for Operation Tuleta have informed me that they have identified information of evidential value in regard to my family's computer being illegally accessed over a sustained period of 2006. The decision by the Metropolitan Police to proceed to a full criminal investigation was conveyed to me this week by Tuleta police officers".

== Arrests ==
On 24 November 2011, a 52-year-old man was arrested in Milton Keynes "on suspicion of Computer Misuse Act offences". He was the first person arrested under Operation Tuleta and was subsequently released on police bail.

In February 2012, during evidence to the Leveson Inquiry, Deputy Assistant Commissioner Akers mentioned the existence of Operation Kalmyk, a new investigation related to Operation Tuleta. She also said that Operation Tuleta had about 20 police officers, who were looking into 57 claims of "data intrusion" on behalf of journalists. She added that they were examining 4 terabytes of data.

On 24 February 2012, it was announced that two men were arrested for hacking. On 5 April 2012, it was revealed in the Press that one of these two men was Steve Hayes, at the time owner of London Wasps Rugby Club and Wycombe Wanderers Football Club. He was arrested on suspicion of offences under the Computer Misuse Act 1990 and the Regulation of Investigatory Powers Act 2000. They were taken to London police stations and later bailed to return in June and July 2012 pending further enquiries. These arrests were not directly linked to any news organisation or the activities of journalists.

On 13 July 2012, it was announced that, following the arrest of a 55-year-old man in Cardiff, the number of arrests under Operation Tuleta had risen to six.

A seventh person, believed to be a Sun journalist, was arrested in North London on 19 July. An eighth person, reported to be the Sun chief foreign correspondent Nick Parker, was arrested by appointment, and released on bail on the 30 July 2012. A ninth person, a 37-year-old Sun journalist, was arrested on 31 July.

A tenth person, a 44-year-old man, was arrested on the 23 August, 2012. An eleventh person, described by reports as the former Times journalist Patrick Foster, was arrested on 29 August.

On 7 September 2012, a 33-year-old journalist was arrested, bringing the number of people arrested in relation to Operation Tuleta to 12.

In all, 18 people have been arrested in relation to Operation Tuleta. The details of the remaining five people are somewhat vague, but the 18th person was a 45-year-old woman arrested on 8 November 2012. Arrests on 18th Sept 2013 reached 21 with a 58-year-old ex private detective being detained by Thames Valley Police. Ben Ashford of "The Sun" first to be named over Op Tuleta. Steven A McIntyre ex police detective identified as the 21st arrested person.

== See also ==
- Blue chip hacking scandal
- Operation Weeting
- Operation Elveden
- Operation Rubicon
- Operation Motorman (ICO investigation)
- Metropolitan police role in phone hacking scandal
- News media phone hacking scandal
- Phone hacking scandal reference lists
- Richard Horton (blogger)
