= Leveson Inquiry =

2011 judicial public inquiry into the British press

Logo of the Leveson Inquiry

The Leveson Inquiry was a judicial public inquiry into the culture, practices, and ethics of the British press following the News International phone hacking scandal, chaired by Lord Justice Leveson, who was appointed in July 2011. A series of public hearings were held throughout 2011 and 2012. The Inquiry published the Leveson Report in November 2012, which reviewed the general culture and ethics of the British media, and made recommendations for a new, independent body to replace the existing Press Complaints Commission, which would have to be recognised by the state through new laws. Prime Minister David Cameron, under whose direction the inquiry had been established, said that he welcomed many of the findings, but declined to enact the requisite legislation. Part 2 of the inquiry was to be delayed until after criminal prosecutions regarding events at the News of the World, but the Conservative Party's 2017 manifesto stated that the second part of the inquiry would be dropped entirely, and this was confirmed by Culture Secretary Matt Hancock in a statement to the House of Commons on 1 March 2018.

== Background ==
In 2007, News of the World royal editor Clive Goodman and private investigator Glenn Mulcaire were convicted of illegal interception of phone messages. According to the News of the World, this was an isolated incident, but The Guardian claimed that evidence existed that this practice extended beyond Goodman and Mulcaire.

In 2011, after a civil settlement with Sienna Miller, the Metropolitan Police Service set up a new investigation, Operation Weeting. On 4 July 2011, it was reported that the detectives found evidence suggesting that News of the World reporters had hacked the voicemail of murder victim Milly Dowler. In response to the revelation, the Hacked Off campaign "for a full public inquiry into phone hacking and other forms of illegal intrusion by the press" was formed by the Media Standards Trust on 5 July, to be launched on the following day. On 13 July, Prime Minister David Cameron announced that a public inquiry under the Inquiries Act 2005 would be chaired by Lord Justice Leveson.

A 14 September 2011 press release stated that Part 1 of the Leveson Inquiry would be addressing:

"the culture, practices and ethics of the press, including contacts between the press and politicians and the press and the police; it is to consider the extent to which the current regulatory regime has failed and whether there has been a failure to act upon any previous warnings about media misconduct."

and Part 2:

"the extent of unlawful or improper conduct within News International, other media organisations or other organisations. It will also consider the extent to which any relevant police force investigated allegations relating to News International, and whether the police received corrupt payments or were otherwise complicit in misconduct."

Part 2 would have been addressed later because of ongoing investigations by law enforcement organisations in Operations Weeting, Elveden and Tuleta. By 2015, it had been shelved.

== Inquiry ==
On 20 July 2011, Cameron announced in a speech to Parliament the final terms of reference of Leveson's inquiry, stating that it would extend beyond newspapers to include broadcasters and social media. He also announced a panel of six people who have been working with the judge on the inquiry:

- Sir David Bell, chairman of the Media Standards Trust and formerly of the Financial Times
- Shami Chakrabarti, director of Liberty
- Lord Currie, former Ofcom director
- Elinor Goodman, former political editor of Channel 4 News
- George Jones, former political editor of the Daily Telegraph
- Sir Paul Scott-Lee, former Chief Constable of West Midlands Police

The Inquiry was funded through two Government departments: the Department for Culture, Media and Sport and the Home Office.

Core participants were designated by Leveson as being: News International, the Metropolitan Police, victims, Northern and Shell Network Ltd, Guardian News and Media Ltd, Associated Newspapers Ltd, Trinity Mirror, Telegraph Media Group, and the National Union of Journalists. In January 2012 Surrey Police were added to the list of core participants.

A 14 September 2011 press release also named 46 politicians, sportsmen, other public figures, and members of the public who may have been victims of media intrusion and who have been granted "core participant" status in the inquiry. As of November 2011 this number had increased to 51.

It was reported in the media that Leveson had attended two parties in the prior 12 months at the London home of Matthew Freud, son-in-law of Rupert Murdoch and head of Freud Communications PR firm. According to The Independent, Freud had "agreed to do some free consultancy work for the Sentencing Council." The revelations led to a number of Labour MPs calling for Leveson to be removed from the Inquiry. These were two large evening events attended in Leveson's capacity as Chairman of the Sentencing Council, and with the knowledge of the Lord Chief Justice.

=== Witnesses ===
Oral evidence was taken at the Royal Courts of Justice, and was streamed live over the Internet. Over three modules, 337 witnesses were called and about 300 other statements made.

Hearings for the first module took place from November 2011 to February 2012, and considered the relationship between the press and the public. This module included testimony from Sally Dowler (mother of Milly Dowler), Kate and Gerry McCann (parents of the missing Madeleine McCann), and Chris Jefferies who was wrongly arrested for the murder of Joanna Yeates in 2011. The inquiry heard joint testimony from Anna van Heeswijk (Object), Jacqui Hunt (Equality Now), Heather Harvey (Eaves) and Marai Larasi (End Violence against Women) as well as the singer Charlotte Church regarding the image of women in tabloid journalism. It also included the actors Hugh Grant and Steve Coogan, the author J. K. Rowling, and figures from journalism and broadcasting: Jeremy Paxman, Nick Davies, Paul McMullan, Alastair Campbell, Piers Morgan, Kelvin MacKenzie, Richard Desmond, Ian Hislop, James Harding, Alan Rusbridger, Mark Thompson, Lord Patten, Michael Grade, Lord Hunt and Paul Dacre.

The next module (February and March) examined the relationship between the press and police, and saw testimony from political and police figures, including Brian Paddick, Lord Prescott, Simon Hughes, John Yates, Andy Hayman, Sir Paul Stephenson, Elizabeth Filkin, Lord Condon, Lord Stevens, Lord Blair and Cressida Dick.

The final module (April to June), on the relationship between press and politicians, saw testimony from a variety of senior politicians, including four Prime Ministers, along with press figures such as Aidan Barclay, Evgeny Lebedev, James Murdoch, Rupert Murdoch, Viscount Rothermere, Andy Coulson and Rebekah Brooks.

== Report ==
=== Publication ===
The 2,000-page final report was published on 29 November 2012, along with a 48-page executive summary. Leveson found that the existing Press Complaints Commission was not sufficient, and recommended a new independent body, which would have a range of sanctions available to it, including fines and direction of the prominence of apologies and corrections.

Membership of the body would be voluntary, but incentivised by schemes such as a kitemark, an inquisitorial arbitration service for handling tort claims such as libel and breach of privacy, and by allowing exemplary damages to be awarded in cases brought against non-participants in the scheme, something not usually part of English law. Leveson rejected the characterisation of his proposal as "statutory regulation of the press".

Leveson also made recommendations regarding the Data Protection Act, the powers and duties of the Information Commissioner, and about conduct of relations between the press, the police, and politicians. He praised the satirical magazine Private Eye for previously having refused to join the Press Complaints Commission, saying it was an 'understandable consequence' of the perceived closeness between the Commission and 'those so often held to account by that publication'.

=== Reaction ===
Shortly after the publication of the report, David Cameron made a statement to the House of Commons. Cameron welcomed many of Leveson's findings, but expressed "serious concerns and misgivings" regarding the prospect of implementing the changes with legislation. Ed Miliband, the Leader of the Opposition, called for full implementation of the report. Nick Clegg, the Deputy Prime Minister, and leader of the Liberal Democrats was unable to agree on a position with his coalition partner Cameron, instead making his own statement agreeing that changes in the law were necessary.

In leading newspaper stories the following day, the Financial Times, the Daily Telegraph, The Independent, The Times, the Daily Express, and the Daily Mirror broadly agreed with Cameron's position, while The Guardian declared that Miliband has taken a "principled position", but that "great care" would be required for the legislation. It stated that "[Cameron] who commissioned it and who has had very little time in which to study it, should think carefully before dismissing significant parts of it." It added, "The press should treat it with respect – and not a little humility."

Ian Hislop, editor of Private Eye, which had never signed up to the PCC, said he was in concurrence with a lot of Leveson's findings and the handling of the inquiry. However, he disagreed with suggestions that those publications which did not voluntarily join up to the proposed self-regulatory body should be penalised by paying heavy costs and exemplary damages on potential libel actions, even if they won the case. The leader of the National Union of Journalists, Michelle Stanistreet, hailed Leveson's backing of a contractual "conscience clause".

Victims group Hacked Off called for full implementation of Leveson's recommendations, starting a petition which was signed by over 145,000 people (as of 10 December 2012). Gerry McCann said that Cameron had earlier made a pledge that he would implement the report if it was not "bonkers". J.K. Rowling, who gave evidence to the inquiry, wrote that she did this in good faith and felt "duped and angry" by the Prime Minister's response, and victims refused to meet the Culture Secretary, speaking of a sense of "betrayal".

Talks regarding implementation between politicians and the press were scheduled to start in December 2012, and Lord Hunt, the current chair of the PCC, said the new regulator should be set up by summer 2013. Addressing a conference in Sydney on privacy and the internet, Lord Justice Leveson stated he was watching developments in the UK "with interest", but declined to comment further. He said: "It is because I treat the report as a judgment and judges simply do not enter into discussion about judgments they have given. They do not respond to comment, however misconceived; neither do they seek to correct error."

A small issue which received some minor press attention, was an incident where the Leveson report incorrectly listed a "Brett Straub" as one of the founders of The Independent newspaper. The name originated from Wikipedia vandalism by one of Straub's friends as a prank, who in several erroneous edits falsely included Straub's name in several articles across the site.

Associated Newspapers Ltd challenged a ruling on the admissibility of anonymous evidence by inquiry chairman Lord Justice Leveson. The presiding judges refused the application for judicial review on the grounds that individual anonymity requests should be dealt with by the chairman of the inquiry rather than the judiciary.

== Maria Miller expenses row ==
On 12 December 2012, it was reported that during a telephone call to The Daily Telegraph Prime Minister David Cameron's spokesman, Craig Oliver, had warned the newspaper against running a critical story on MP's expenses claimed by Culture Secretary Maria Miller because of her role in enacting proposals in the Leveson report. Downing Street denied that any threats were made. The Telegraph had reported that Miller had claimed £90,000 of expenses between 2005 and 2009 for a house in which her parents were living. Miller herself claimed they were dependents. The Parliamentary Commission for Standards subsequently launched an investigation into Miller's expenses. Writing in The Guardian on 15 December, the journalist Tanya Gold argued the episode demonstrated the need for a free press.

== Cost ==
According to page 388 of the Government Response to the House of Lords Select Committee on the Inquiries Act 2005 published in 2013, the total cost of the Leveson Inquiry was £5.4 million.

== See also ==
- News media phone hacking scandal reference lists
- Mass media regulation
- Metropolitan Police role in the news media phone hacking scandal
- News International phone hacking scandal
- Overview of news media phone hacking scandals
- Police corruption
- Politico-media complex
- Public inquiry
- Raymond Finkelstein, who headed a similar inquiry in Australia
- Robert Jay, lead counsel for the inquiry
- Royal Charter on self-regulation of the press
