= Phone hacking =

Surveillance or computer investigation

Phone hacking is the practice of exploring a mobile device, often using computer exploits to analyze everything from the lowest memory and CPU levels up to the highest file system and process levels. Modern open source tooling has become fairly sophisticated to be able to "hook" into individual functions within any running app on an unlocked device and allow deep inspection and modification of its functions.

Phone hacking is a large branch of computer security that includes studying various situations exactly how attackers use security exploits to gain some level of access to a mobile device in a variety of situations and presumed access levels.

The term came to prominence during the News International phone hacking scandal, in which it was alleged (and in some cases proved in court) that the British tabloid newspaper the News of the World had been involved in the interception of voicemail messages of the British royal family, other public figures, and murdered schoolgirl Milly Dowler.

== Victims of phone hacking ==
Although mobile phone users may be targeted, "for those who are famous, rich or powerful or whose prize is important enough (for whatever reason) to devote time and resources to make a concerted attack, it is usually more common, there are real risks to face."

== Techniques ==
=== Voicemail hacking ===
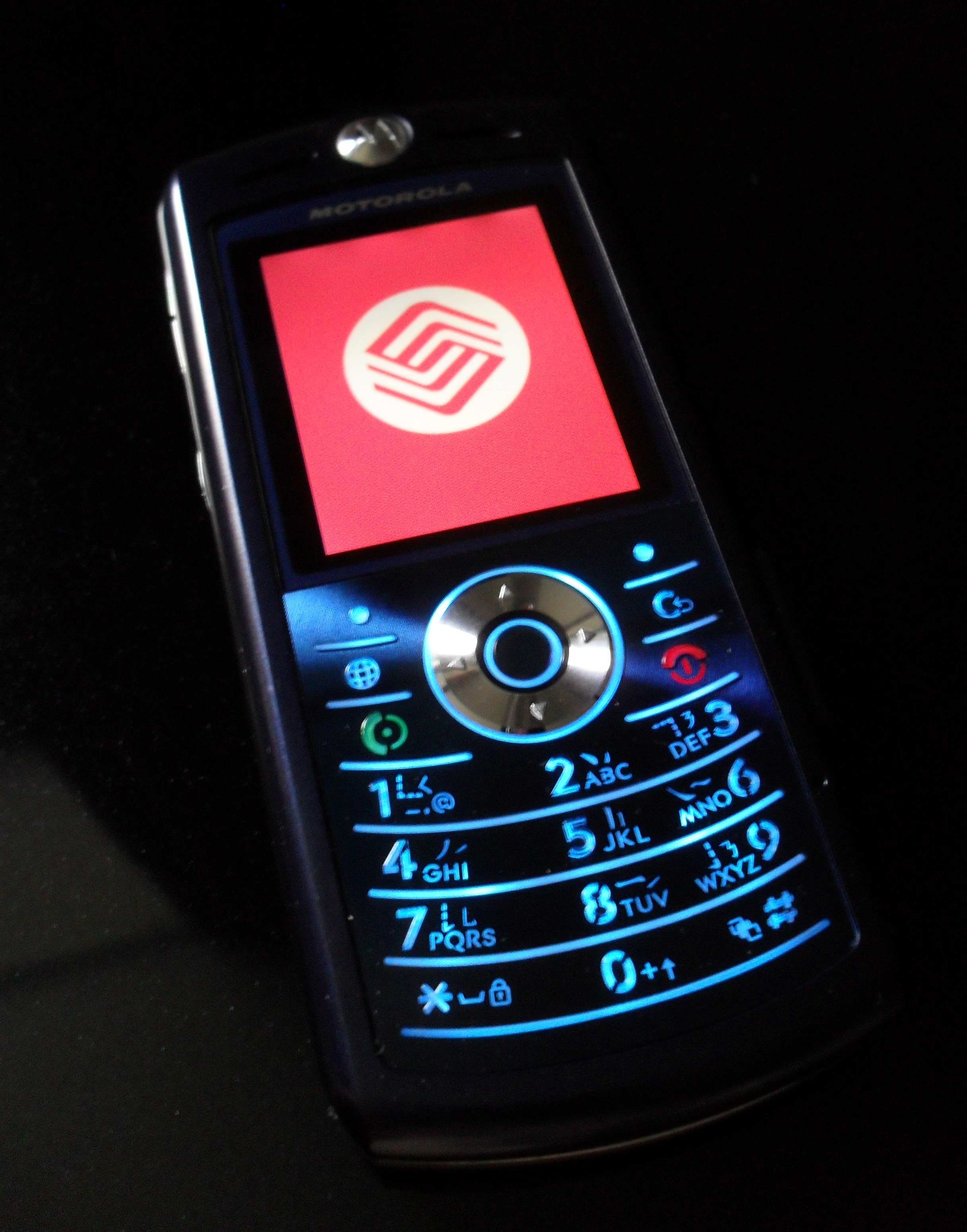
Phone hacking often involves unauthorized access to the voicemail of a mobile phone

The unauthorized remote access to voicemail systems, such as exposed by the News International phone hacking scandal, is possible because of weaknesses in the implementations of these systems by telephone companies.

Mobile phone voicemail messages may be accessed on a landline telephone with the entry of a personal identification number (PIN). Reporters for News International would call the number of an individual's mobile phone, wait to be moved to voicemail, and then guess the PIN, which was often set at a simple default such as 0000 or 1234.

Even where the default PIN is not known, social engineering can be used to reset the voicemail PIN code to the default by impersonating the owner of the phone with a call to a call centre. During the mid-2000s, calls originating from the handset registered to a voicemail account would be put straight through to voicemail without the need of a PIN. A hacker could use caller ID spoofing to impersonate a target's handset caller ID and thereby gain access to the associated voicemail without a PIN.

Following controversies over phone hacking and criticism of mobile service providers who allowed access to voicemail without a PIN, many mobile phone companies have strengthened the default security of their systems so that remote access to voicemail messages and other phone settings can no longer be achieved even via a default PIN. For example, AT&T announced in August 2011 that all new wireless subscribers would be required to enter a PIN when checking their voicemail, even when checking it from their phones. To encourage password strength, some companies now disallow the use of consecutive or repeat digits in voicemail PINs.

=== Handsets ===
An analysis of user-selected PIN codes suggested that ten numbers represent 15% of all iPhone passcodes, with "1234" and "0000" being the most common, with years of birth and graduation also being common choices. Even if a four-digit PIN is randomly selected, the key space is very small ($10^{4}$ or 10,000 possibilities), making PINs significantly easier to brute force than most passwords; someone with physical access to a handset secured with a PIN can therefore feasibly determine the PIN in a short time.

Mobile phone microphones can be activated remotely by security agencies or telephone companies without physical access as long as the battery has not been removed. This "roving bug" feature has been used by law enforcement agencies and intelligence services to listen in on nearby conversations.

Other techniques for phone hacking include tricking a mobile phone user into downloading malware that monitors activity on the phone. Bluesnarfing is an unauthorized access to a phone via Bluetooth.

=== Other ===
There are flaws in the implementation of the GSM encryption algorithm that allow passive interception. The equipment needed is available to government agencies or can be built from freely available parts.

In December 2011, German researcher Karsten Nohl revealed that it was possible to hack into mobile phone voice and text messages on many networks with free decryption software available on the Internet. He blamed the mobile phone companies for relying on outdated encryption techniques in the 2G system, and said that the problem could be fixed very easily.

== Legality ==
Phone hacking, being a form of surveillance, is illegal in many countries unless it is carried out as lawful interception by a government agency. In the News International phone hacking scandal, private investigator Glenn Mulcaire was found to have violated the Regulation of Investigatory Powers Act 2000. He was sentenced to six months in prison in January 2007. Renewed controversy over the phone-hacking claims led to the closure of the News of the World in July 2011.

In December 2010, the Truth in Caller ID Act was signed into United States law, making it illegal "to cause any caller identification service to knowingly transmit misleading or inaccurate caller identification information with the intent to defraud, cause harm, or wrongfully obtain anything of value."

== See also ==
- Mobile security
- Operation Weeting
- Phreaking
- Wiretapping
- Vault 7
- SIM swap scam
