= Flat Earth (disambiguation) =

The flat Earth is the idea that the Earth is flat.

Flat Earth may also refer to:

== Beliefs ==
- Modern flat Earth beliefs, beliefs and organizations that claim the Earth is flat
- Myth of the flat Earth, the modern misconception that the prevailing cosmological view during the Middle Ages saw the Earth as flat

== Books ==
=== Non-fiction ===
- Flat Earth News (book), non-fiction book by Nick Davies about malpractice on Fleet Street
- Inventing the Flat Earth, a non-fiction book debunking the myth of the flat Earth

=== Fiction ===
- Flatland, a novella about a fictional two-dimensional world
- Tales from the Flat Earth, a series of fantasy novels by Tanith Lee

== Music ==
- Flat Earth Society (band), a Belgian big band ensemble
- The Flat Earth, a 1984 album by Thomas Dolby
- Flat Earthers: The Musical, a 2024 Australian musical
- "Flat Earther", a 2026 song by Maisie Peters

== Other uses ==
- Flat Earth Productions, a special effects production company
- Flat Earth Crisps, a food manufactured by Frito-Lay
- Flat Earth FC, a former Spanish football team
- A flat Earth strategy, another name for a concept-driven strategy
- This Flat Earth, a 2018 play by Lindsey Ferrentino

== See also ==
- Flat Earth News (disambiguation)
- Flat Earth Society (disambiguation)
- Flat World Knowledge, a publisher of college-level textbooks and educational supplements
- The World Is Flat (disambiguation)
