= Genetic and anthropometric studies on Japanese people =

Subject in population genetics

The Japanese archipelago connected to the Korean Peninsula by a land bridge (3.5–2 Ma) allowing early human migration.

In population genetics, extensive research has been done on the genetic origins of modern Japanese people.

Historically, Japanese people possess ancestries introduced during the Jōmon period, Yayoi period, and arguably, the Kofun period. These genetic markers are best represented by the Jōmon, Yayoi, and Toraijin peoples respectively.

Genetically, they are categorized into three separate, but related groups: Ainu, Ryukyuan and Mainland (Yamato). According to modern genetic analyses, they primarily have Northeast Asian, East Asian, and to a lesser extent, heterogeneous Jōmon ancestries.

Anthropologically, they are classified under the "Northeast Asian" cluster and show strong resemblance with Koreans, and to some extent, southern East Asian groups.

== Origins ==
=== Dual ancestry theory ===
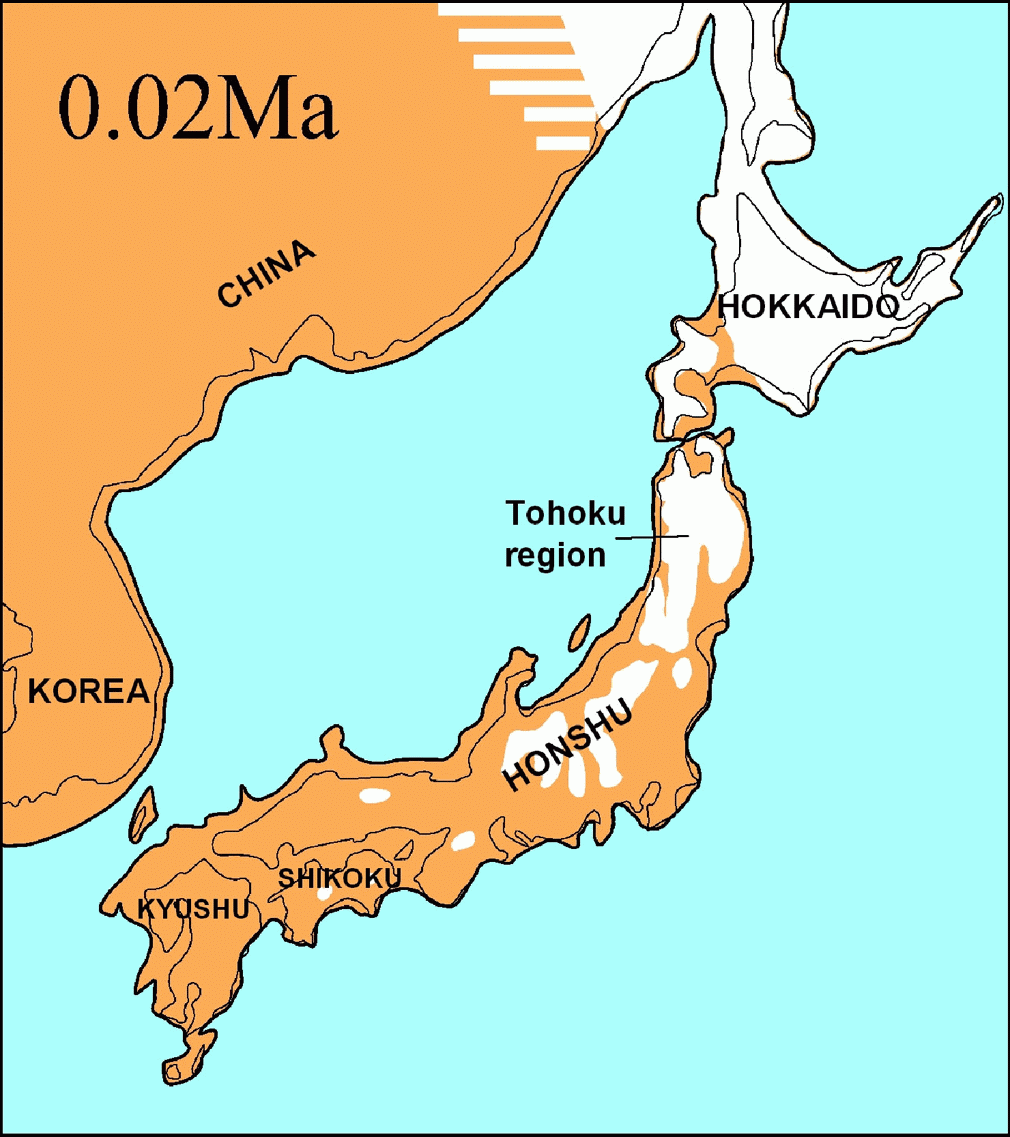
Glacier cover in Japan at the height of the last glaciation about 20,000 years ago with the land bridge now gone.

A common origin of the Japanese people has been proposed by a number of scholars since Arai Hakuseki first brought up the theory. Fujii Sadamoto (藤井 貞幹), also known as Teikan Tou (藤 貞幹), a pioneer of modern archaeology in Japan, also treated the issue in 1781. After the end of World War II, Kotondo Hasebe (長谷部 言人) and Hisashi Suzuki [ja] (鈴木 尚) claimed that Japanese people originated from the peoples of the Jōmon period instead of newcomers from the Yayoi period (300 BCE – 300 CE).

Kazuro Hanihara (埴原 和郎) announced a new racial admixture theory in 1984. Hanihara also announced the theory "dual structure model" in English in 1991. According to Hanihara, modern Japanese lineages began with Jōmon people, who moved into the Japanese archipelago during the Paleolithic. Hanihara believed that there was a second wave of immigrants from Northeast Asia to Japan during the Yayoi period.

Following a population expansion in Neolithic times, these newcomers found their way to the Japanese archipelago sometime during the Yayoi period. As a result, miscegenation was common in the island regions of Kyūshū, Shikoku, and Honshū, but did not prevail in the outlying islands of Okinawa and Hokkaidō, and the Ryukyuan and Ainu people continued to dominate there. Mark J. Hudson claimed that the main ethnic image of Japanese people was biologically and linguistically formed from 400 BCE to 1,200 CE. Currently, the most well-regarded theory is that present-day Japanese have dual descent from the indigenous Jōmon people and the immigrant Yayoi people.

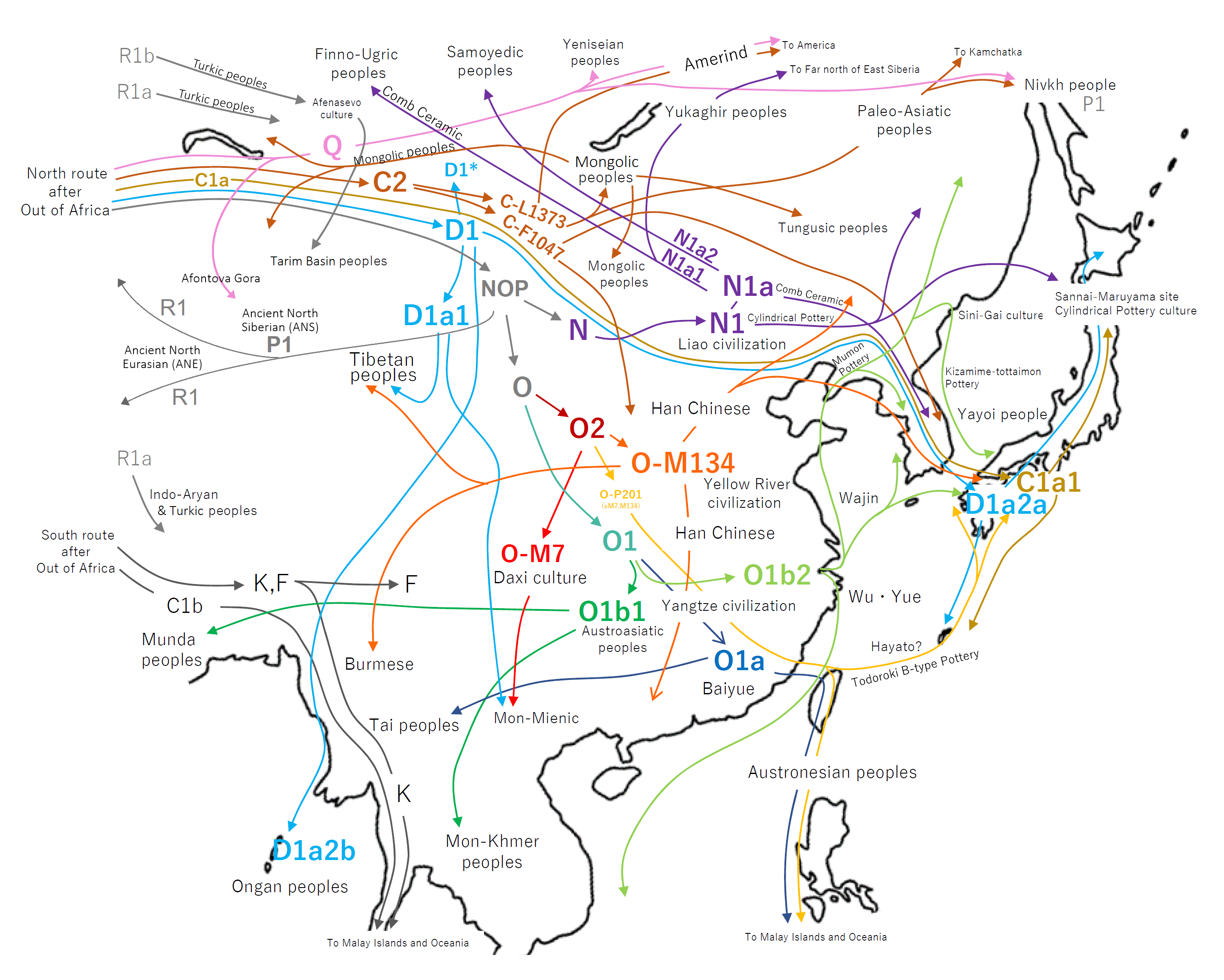
The main migration routes into Japan during the Jōmon and Yayoi period.

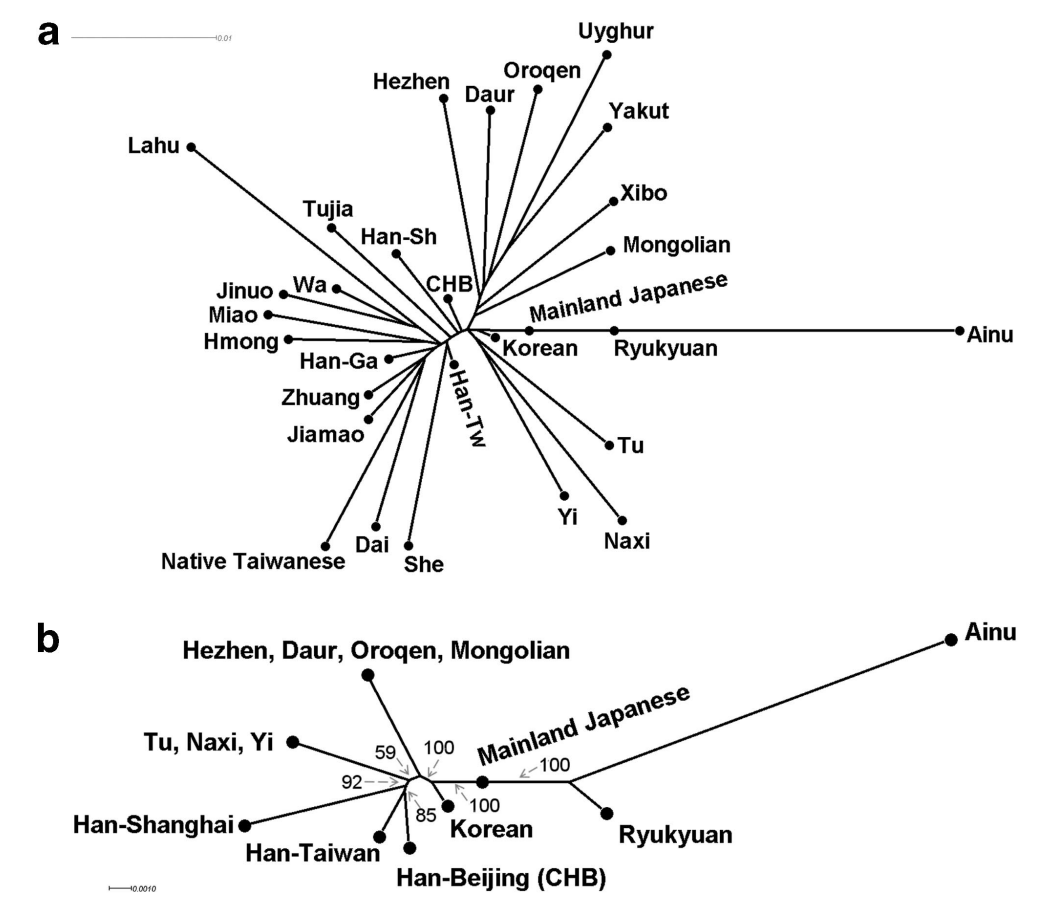
Phylogenetic tree of Ainu, Ryukyuan, Mainland Japanese, and other Asian ethnic groups. The Ainu and the Ryukyuan were clustered with 100% bootstrap probability, followed by the Mainland Japanese. The three populations in the Japanese archipelago clustered with the Korean with 100% bootstrap probability.

The modern Japanese cluster is said to be the most similar with the Korean one; in a haplotype-based study, the Japanese cluster was found to share 87–94% of its genetic components with the Korean cluster, compared with a Han Chinese result of only 0–8%, a distinct contrast. The genetic affinity to the Korean cluster was particularly strong among a cluster hailing from Shimane specifically and Honshu more broadly, but relatively less pronounced, albeit still overwhelming, in the Kyushu clusters. In any case, the study clarifies that "the estimate of ancestry profile cannot provide the definitive history of original migration, unless it will be further verified against historical evidence."

- A 2011 study by Sean Lee and Toshikazu Hasegawa reported that a common origin of Japonic languages had originated around 2,182 years before present.
- According to a 2015 study, modern Japanese possess 2.2% West Eurasian ancestry, which likely originated from interactions with Silk Road traders around 1700 years ago.
- A study in 2017 estimates the Jōmon ancestry in people from Tokyo at approximately 12%.
- In 2018, an independent research conducted by director Kenichi Shinoda [ja] (篠田 謙一) and his team at National Museum of Nature and Science was broadcast on NHK Science ZERO and it was discovered that the modern day Japanese are genetically close to the modern day Koreans. A genome study (Takahashi et al. 2019) shows that modern Japanese (Yamato) do not have much Jōmon ancestry at all. Nuclear genome analyses of Jōmon samples and modern Japanese samples show strong differences. Various studies estimate the proportion of Jōmon ancestry in Japanese people at around 9–13%, with the remainder derived from later migrations from Asia including the Yayoi people.
- According to a March 2021 study on genetic distance measurements from a large scale genetic study titled 'Genomic insights into the formation of human populations in East Asia', the modern "Japanese populations can be modelled as deriving from Korean (91%) and Jōmon (9%)."

Some studies suggest a genetic connection between Koreans and Southeast Asian populations. A 2017 study by Ulsan University analyzed a 7,700-year-old skull in Korea, finding evidence of genetic links to ancient populations, including those from Southeast Asia, such as Vietnamese people. This research highlights the complex migration patterns in East Asia's prehistory.

Similarly, Japanese research conducted in 1999 proposed that the Yayoi people, an ancient population contributing to modern Japanese ancestry, may have migrated from the Yangtze River basin in southern China. This was supported by DNA analyses showing similarities between Yayoi remains in southwestern Japan and early Han Dynasty remains from China's Jiangsu Province.

Other studies suggest that modern Koreans share closer genetic ties with Central Asian and Northern East Asian populations. A mitochondrial DNA analysis revealed a genetic affinity between Koreans and Mongolians, indicating a shared Central Asian ancestry. Additionally, genetic research suggests that while Koreans share some common ancestry with other East Asian populations, their genetic ties with the Chinese are relatively more distant. Genome-wide studies further demonstrate that Koreans are genetically closest to Yamato Japanese and Manchu populations, reflecting shared ancestry and historical interactions, while genetic connections between Koreans and Southeast Asians are more limited. According to a 2023 study, the Hondo Japanese are genetically intermediate between the Chinese/Korean and Ryukyuan clusters.

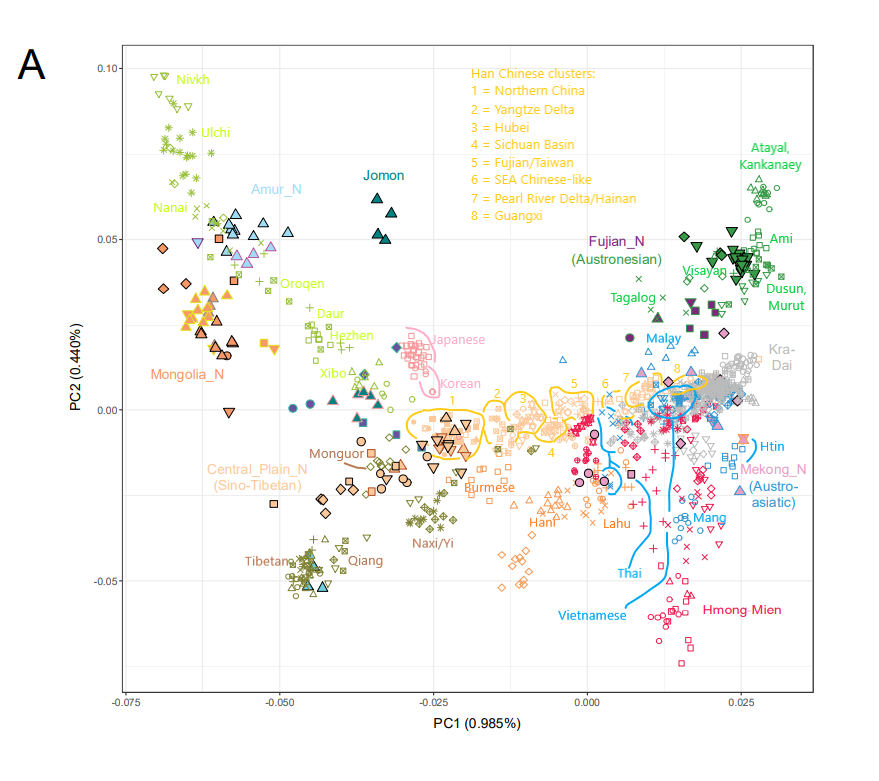
A population genomic PCA graph, showing the substructure of Eastern Asian populations, including analyzed Japanese Jōmon samples. Japanese people's cluster (squares) is almost indistinguishable to the Korean people's cluster (circles), while the Jōmon samples are shifted towards the Siberian cluster in a more distinct position. (2020)

Some theories propose that the Yayoi people introduced wet rice cultivation to Japan from the Korean peninsula and Jiangnan near the Yangtze River Delta in ancient China. Additionally, some scholars suggest that the Yayoi and their ancestors, the Wajin, may have originated from areas like Yunnan province in southern China. Suwa Haruo argued that Wa-zoku (Wajin) might have been related to the Baiyue (百越).

- According to Alexander Vovin, the Yayoi were present in the central and southern parts of Korea before they were displaced and assimilated by arriving proto-Koreans. A similar view was raised by Whitman (2012), further noting that the Yayoi are not closely related to the proto-Koreanic speakers and that Koreanic arrived later from Manchuria to Korea at around 300 BC and coexisted with the Japonic speakers. Both influenced each other and a later founder effect diminished the internal variety of both language families.
- Jared Diamond, the author of Guns, Germs, and Steel, suggested that the Yayoi period in Japan was initiated by immigrants from the Korean peninsula. Citing research findings, he stated that Yayoi-era Japan likely received millions of immigrants from Korea. These immigrants, during the Yayoi transition, are believed to have overwhelmed the genetic contribution of the Jōmon people, whose population was estimated to be around 75,000 at that time.
- According to a 2020 study, Japanese exhibit high genetic similarities with Koreans and inherited their East Asian-related components during the Yayoi period. Proto-Koreans received genetic input from Siberian-related and Austroasiatic-related populations, along with combined Vat Komnou-related and Nui Nap-related sources from Southern China after the Bronze Age, which shaped the genetic variation of modern Koreans by over 70%. Other studies also show this Southeast Asian contribution in proto-Koreans.
- Miyamoto (2022) states that proto-Japonic and proto-Koreanic shared a common origin in the eastern Liaoxi district of southern Manchuria. Proto-Japonic-speaking peoples migrated to Korea first and were associated with Mumun populations, who were influenced by Pianpu culture from the Liaodong district and rice-farming Shandong populations.

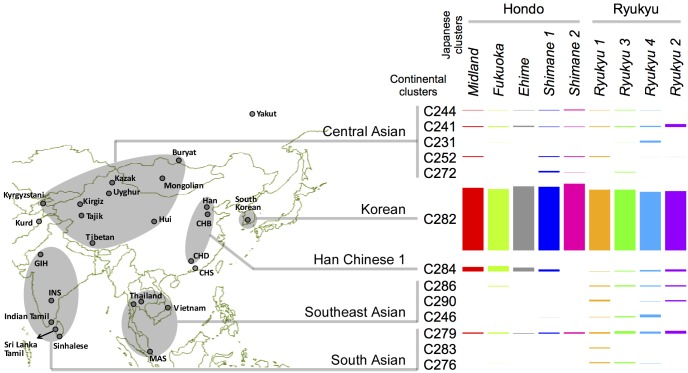
Ancestry profile of Japanese genetic clusters illustrating their genetic similarities to five mainland Asian populations.

- Ishiya et al. (2024) states that present Japanese and Koreans possess genetic components related to Ancient Northeast Asians (ANA), especially those from Mongolia and the Baikal region. Yayoi individuals were also closely related to Middle Neolithic individuals from Inner Mongolia, Miaozigou and the Haminmangha site, as well as Early Neolithic individuals (Xiaojingshan and Boshan) from Shandong, China. They also share Papuan-like components with the Jōmon people but this might reflect a different diverged East Eurasian lineage shared with other Asians.
- Kim et al. (2024) states that the Yayoi have the highest genetic affinities to the ancient "Korean_Ando (Antu)" population and drift further away from other contemporary Korean populations, like those from Gunsan and Gimhae.
  - A previous study by Robbeets (2021) states that the Middle Neolithic "Korean_Ando" population derive 100% of their ancestry from Hongshan culture-related populations. However, they model the Yayoi as having mostly Upper Xiajiadian-related ancestry, which is disputed by other researchers, who believe that the Yayoi/Mumun peoples do not have exceptionally close ties with Upper Xiajiadian-related ancestry and can also be modeled with Hongshan-related ancestry.
- Yu et al. (2025) suggested that there was a genetic contribution from ancient Liaodong Peninsula populations to the ancestors of modern Japanese and Koreans. The study tentatively theorized that the Yellow River farmers descendants subjugated the previous Liaodong populations, forcing the elite Liaodong individuals such as Gao Bin (高賓) to attain more Yellow River ancestry while the native Liaodong agricultural populations moved towards Korea and Japan after the Warring States period.

=== Tripartite ancestry theory ===
A September 2021 study published by Cooke et al. in Science Advances proposed that the people of Japan bore genetic signatures from three ancient populations rather than just two as previously thought.

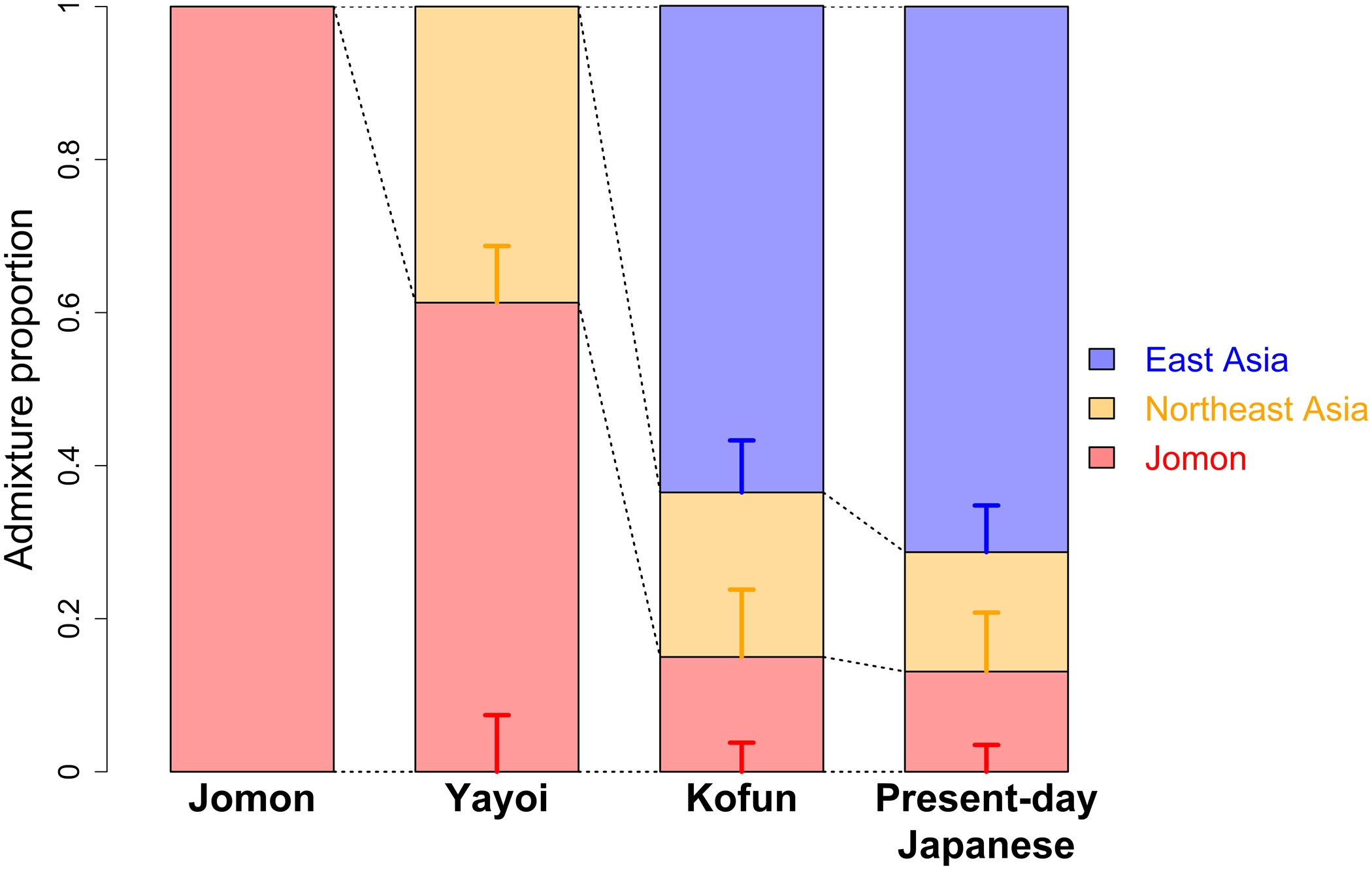
- Proposed tripartite styled genomic transitions in parallel with cultural transitions in pre- and protohistoric Japan. (2021)
  Cooke at al. states that in addition to the previously discovered Jōmon and Yayoi components, a new component (i.e. Kofun) was hypothesized to have been introduced, most likely from the southern Korean peninsula, during the Yayoi–Kofun transition period, where there was strong cultural and political affinity with Korea and China. According to Cooke et al., the genetic profile of the modern Japanese population was established in the Kofun period. The Kofun component, however, is specifically concentrated in Kinki, Hokuriku and Shikoku. Overall, the average modern Japanese derives over 70% of their ancestry from the Kofun component, with 15-20% being derived from the Yayoi component and the rest from the Jōmon component. The study's authors also note that modern Japanese have slightly more East Asian ancestry than Kofun peoples. Cooke et al. hypothesized that the Kofun component was related to ancient Yellow River populations from the Late Bronze Age to Iron Age, who themselves had 40% Northeast Asian ancestry and 60% East Asian ancestry.
  - The same paper showcased that the Yayoi component has excess affinities to populations with no cultural relations to rice farming such as those from the West Liao River basin in Northeast China, Baikal and Northeast Siberia. Cooke et al. also found that rice farming was introduced to Japan from the Shandong peninsula to the Liaodong Peninsula and finally to the Korean peninsula, where it was directly spread to Japan.
  - In a 2023 study, Cooke et al. attributes the presence of mutations in the Kofun population, such as those related to the ADH1B gene, to their East Asian-dominant ancestry. They explain that the mutation arose in the Yellow River basin after the Late Neolithic period and was previously unobservable in West Liao River, Amur River and Neolithic Baikal populations, who all contributed to the genetic makeup of Yayoi populations. This mutation was also spread to the Korean peninsula, where the Kofun population initially received it.
- According to Pere Gelabert in a 2022 paper, ancient Koreans of the Three Kingdoms period of Korea (i.e. "Korea-TK"), bore close genetic similarity with Kofun-era Japanese people. In particular, "Korea-TK_2" is closely related to "present-day Japanese, the ancient Kofun, and other ancient Japanese populations with Jomon ancestry" due to their higher Jōmon-like ancestry. "Korea-TK_2" can be modeled as having 66% ± 7% Bronze Age West Liao River-related ancestry and 34% ± 7% Jōmon-related ancestry. Or 32% Northeast Asian, 43% Han, and 25% Japan Jōmon. In regards to the Japanese Kofun population themselves, they could be modeled as having 71% ± 10% "Korea-TK_2"-related ancestry and 29% ± 10% Late Bronze Age to Iron Age Yellow River-related ancestry. Conversely, the "Korea-TK_1" population were more related to modern Koreans although there were some affinities with Japanese too.
- Ruì Wáng (王瑞) and Chún-chāo Wāng (汪群超) (2022) reiterated that Yayoi immigrants did not demographically replace the Jōmon. Instead, they co-existed and intermarried with indigenous Jōmon, which led the Yayoi to have 60% Jōmon ancestry. The rest of their ancestry was Northeast Asian. Jōmon ancestry eventually decreased when ancestries related to Northern Han Chinese (Yellow River ancestry) were introduced in the Kofun period.
  - They later clarified in another paper (2023) that overall, modern Japanese cluster with the "Korean_Antu (Ando)" population, covering Koreans from the Antu County, who share more genetic drift with mainland Koreans, followed by the Han Chinese, Hmong-Mien and Tai-Kadai.
- Xiǎoxī Liú (刘小晰) et al. (2024) stated that Jōmon ancestry in contemporary Japanese people varies depending on region, with Jōmon ancestry being the highest in Southern Japan, especially Okinawa (28.5%), followed by Northeastern Japan (19%) and Western Japan (12%). Western Japan have more East Asian affinities, especially towards Yellow River or Upper Yellow River populations from the Late Bronze Age to Iron Age. Conversely, Northeastern Japan have more Northeast Asian affinities, especially towards ancient Koreans from the Three Kingdoms period. The increased Northeast Asian affinities is tenuously attributed to Emishi influence. They also have affinities with Jōmon-derived Miyako Islanders from the Okinawan Prefecture.
- According to Yamamoto et al. (2024), the Yamato, on average, have 66.4% East Asian ancestry, 21.2% Northeast Asian ancestry and 12.4% Jōmon ancestry. These admixture proportions are best representative of Mainland Yamato Japanese. Jōmon ancestry exhibits regional variation, ranging from 9.8% in Kinki to 26.1% in Okinawa, with some populations in Hokkaido having 31.6% Jōmon ancestry. Yamato from the Kinki region have the lowest Jōmon ancestry due to extensive historic interactions with continental East Asia. East Asian ancestry was represented by Han Chinese whilst Northeast Asian ancestry was represented by Middle Neolithic and Bronze Age West Liao River populations, especially "China_WLR_BA_o" and "China_HMMH_MN" populations.
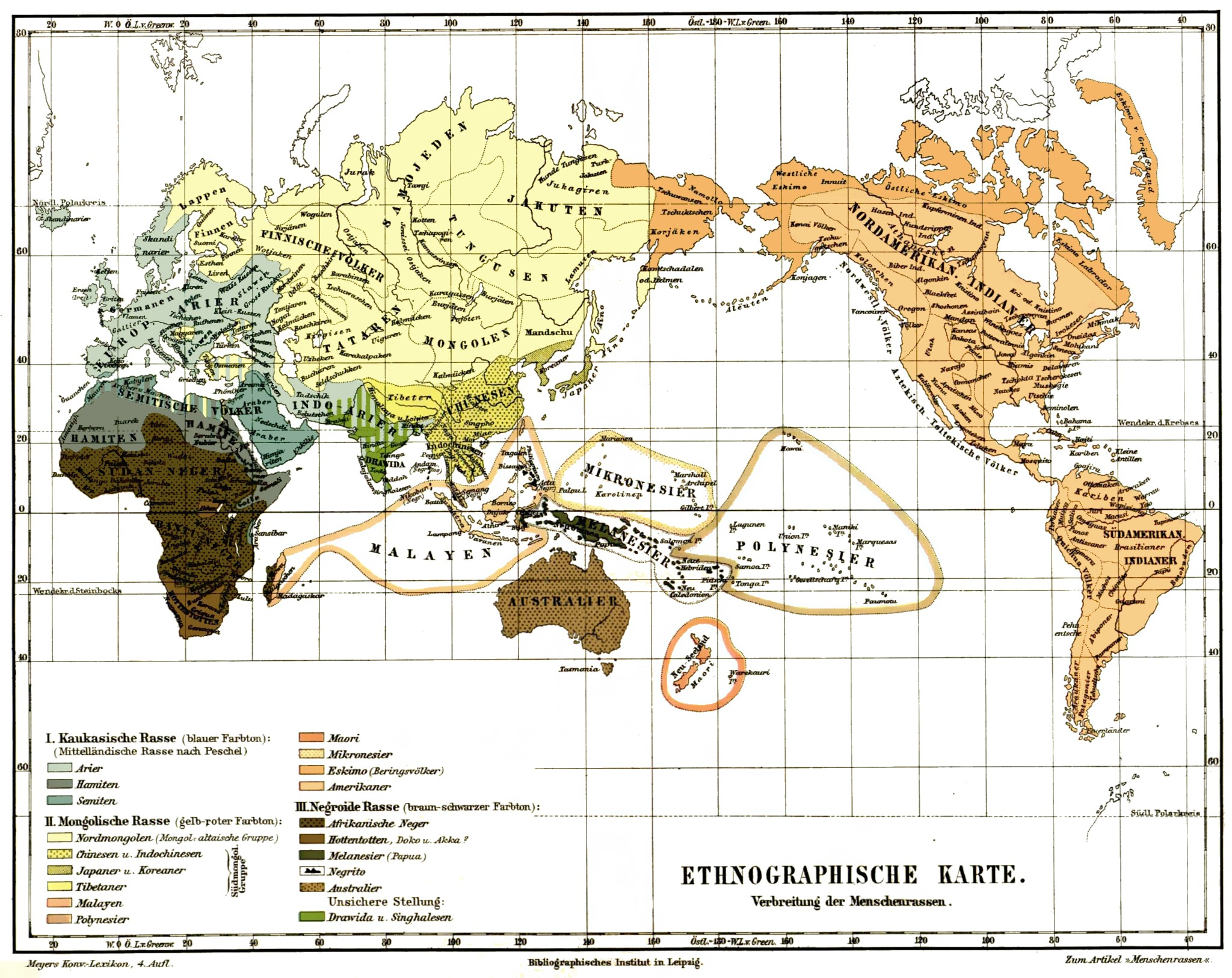
  The concept of "Mongoloid" was popularized by the Meyers Konversations-Lexikon (1885–1890), a late 19th century ethnographic map created by Joseph Meyer. The Japanese were marked as "Neo-Mongoloids" and were classified under the "Japanese & Korean" cluster.
- According to an analysis by historian Makoto Takemitsu (武光 誠) in 2025, about 1.3 to 1.4 million migrants settled in Japan from Korea, especially from Goguryeo, Paekche, and Silla, during the Kofun period. They made up 25% of the total population (5.5 to 5.6 million) of Japan in that period. He himself referred to the Kofun strand as "Kansai ancestry" rather than any previous names given by other researches, comparing it to the Neo-Mongoloids found in East Asia. He cites a recent study from Riken that newly posits that modern Japanese people carry around 25% of the Kansai (East Asian) ancestry at most while the majority of their genetic makeup derives from the Yayoi (Northeast Asian) ancestry and to a lesser extent, Jōmon ancestry.
  - Takemitsu describes the Kofun migrations as a gradual process, where migrants settled in "village communities" that were ruled by powerful chiefs or clans. There, they married with locals of Jōmon and Northeast Asian ancestry and became part of a group that's later known as the "Japanese".
- According to Ishiya et al. (2026), the Yayoi and Kofun populations received significant input from ancient Northeast Asians, especially Neolithic Mongolian populations or alternatively, from Middle Neolithic and Bronze Age West Liao River populations. But compared to Kofun populations, Yayoi populations show stronger genetic affinities to coastal East Eurasians, like those from Early to Late Neolithic Shandong and the Devil's Gate Cave, and Jōmon populations. Among modern populations, the Yayoi are closely related to Daur people.

==== Criticism ====
However, the tripartite theory is being met with criticism since its introduction in 2021. In essence, Japanese researchers claim that a tripartite theory is redundant as the genealogical difference between Yayoi and Kofun groups is not significant enough and that the temporal discrepancy of the periods is minuscule. Japanese linguists also state that the languages spoken during the periods are generally related to each another and that the speakers were most likely related.

- A study published in April 2024 by Hisashi Nakao (中尾 央), claims that Kofun and Yayoi populations were more related to each other than either were with the Jōmon population. Nakao stated that "[the results] suggest that the Jōmon people were rather different from the Yayoi and Kofun people in the facial height and the anterior–posterior length [...] indicating that temporal differences are not significant among the Yayoi and Kofun periods. [...] the large overlap in morphological variation between the Yayoi and Kofun people could be an important step in further research." The research also boasts of using the largest Kofun samples to date.
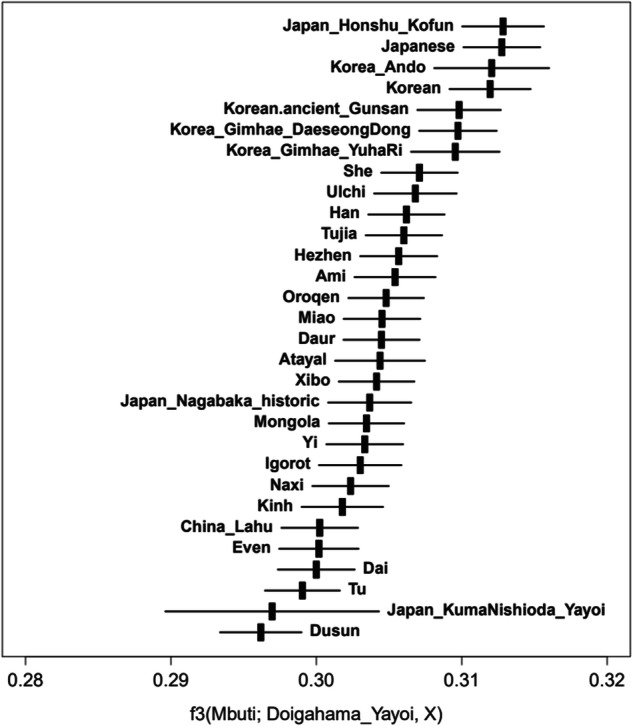
- Genetic drift of the East Asian demographics. (2024)
  According to a study published in October 2024, the Doigahama Yayoi individual, who is representative of the Yayoi population, already possessed substantial East Asian ancestry (67%), similar to modern Japanese (80%). The individual is closely related to the succeeding Kofun population and modern Japanese and Koreans, along with the ancient 'Korean_Ando' population. The study's authors note that Northeastern Siberian and East Asian ancestries were already admixed within ancient Koreans and thus, were not introduced separately in the Yayoi and Kofun periods, respectively. Instead, it is more likely that the peopling of Japan involved continuous migrations from the Korean peninsula until the Kofun period. However, the study did not completely rule out genetic differences between the Yayoi and Kofun populations.
  - The lead researcher and professor at the University of Tokyo's Department of Biological Sciences, Jun Ohashi (大橋 順) spoke with Science Daily, further explaining the new findings and criticizing the previous assumption. "Our results suggest that between the Yayoi and Kofun periods, the majority of immigrants to the Japanese archipelago originated primarily from the Korean peninsula," says Ohashi. "The results also mean the three-way admixture model, which posits that a Northeast Asian group migrated to the Japanese archipelago during the Yayoi period and an East Asian group during the Kofun period, is incorrect."
- A recent interview with the director of the National Museum of Nature and Science, Kenichi Shinoda [ja] (篠田 謙一) in December 2024 summarized the current consensus in regards to the genomic makeup of the modern Japanese. Shinoda stated that over 90% of the modern Japanese DNA derives from an ancient strand that originated at an area near the Liao River around 50,000 years ago, where it was then introduced to the Korean peninsula (which in turn mixed with the Southern Jōmon-like inhabitants) and 10,000 years later was introduced into the Japanese archipelago. Shinoda also remarked that these migrations happened throughout the later Yayoi period and that the Japanese genes remained homogenous since then, stating that "the genetic makeup of the ancient Yayoi people and us (Yamato people) are almost identical". The director did not mention "Kofun", but insisted on calling the later settlers as "Toraijin (Immigrants)" or more specifically "late-Yayoi period settlers", despite taking part in previous studies surrounding the strand and mentioning it at the time of its proposal.
- Linguist, author, and lecturer Makoto Mogi (茂木 誠) (2025) insisted that the immigrants with the "East Asian ancestry" were ethnically different from the Han Chinese due to having northern origins and different linguistic backgrounds. According to Mogi, East Asian-related immigrants such as Empress Jingū's ancestor, Amenohiboko and other contemporary figures were most likely proto-Koreanic speakers due to the similarities in grammar with modern Korean, an argument made similar by fellow linguist Alexander Vovin. Mogi posited that these proto-Koreanic speakers entered the peninsula by replacing or absorbing the pre-existing Peninsular Japonic speaking natives (Southern Jōmon-like inhabitants) before entering Japan, an argument that aligns closely with the anthropological argument made by aforementioned Kenichi Shinoda (2024).
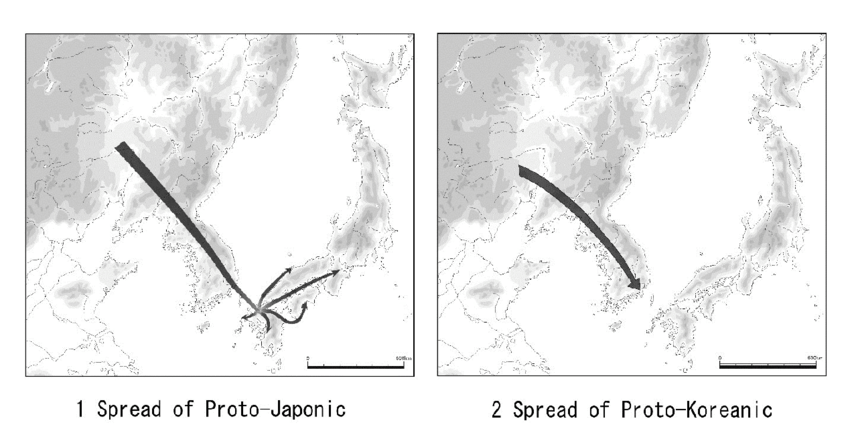
  - The migration routes of proto-Japonic and proto-Koreanic speakers. (2022)
    A similar observation was made previously by Kazuo Miyamoto (宮本 一夫), a renowned linguist and emeritus professor at Kyushu University in 2022. Miyamoto noted that "Central Japanese was heavily influenced by Old Korean (possibly through Baekje) during the Kofun and Asuka periods, from the 4th to 7th centuries AD" which supports Mogi and Vovin's assumptions. He linked the Yayoi period with the Mumun period of Korea and stated that the proto-Japonic language was spread during this time. (Note: [...] the beginning of the Yayoi culture was heavily influenced by the Mumun culture of the southern Korean Peninsula, and some migrants from this region are thought to have moved into northern Kyushu. If Proto-Japonic spread to northern Kyushu from the southern Korean Peninsula at the beginning of the Yayoi culture with migrants, then we can assume that Proto-Japonic was spoken by the people of the Mumun culture. [...] Proto-Japonic languages are thought to have gradually replaced the local Jomon languages in these areas from the Late Yayoi to the beginning of the Kofun period, 2nd – 3rd centuries AD. — Kazuo Miyamoto, The emergence of 'Transeurasian' language families in Northeast Asia as viewed from archaeological evidence) He also remarked that the proto-Japonic of the Yayoi/Mumun period and proto-Koreanic that was introduced during Kofun/Asuka period stemmed from the same ancestral language, stating that "the homeland of both languages is the same based on archeological evidence, and they are kindred language families" and that "Proto-Japonic and Proto-Koreanic split off from the Transeurasian languages in southern Manchuria" positing that the Yayoi (proto-Japonic) and Kofun (proto-Koreanic) migrations were heavily related, a conclusion made similar to Hisashi Nakao (2024).

In essence, the Tripartite ancestry theory is divided into two conclusions; one positing that there was a new component, one that is distinct from the previous Jōmon and Yayoi component, that was introduced from Korea during the Kofun period, and the other rejecting the notion due to high genetic similarities between the Yayoi and Kofun although some differences cannot be ruled out. The theory, however, clearly lays the foundation for several points that are crucial to the anthropometric studies on the Japanese populations:

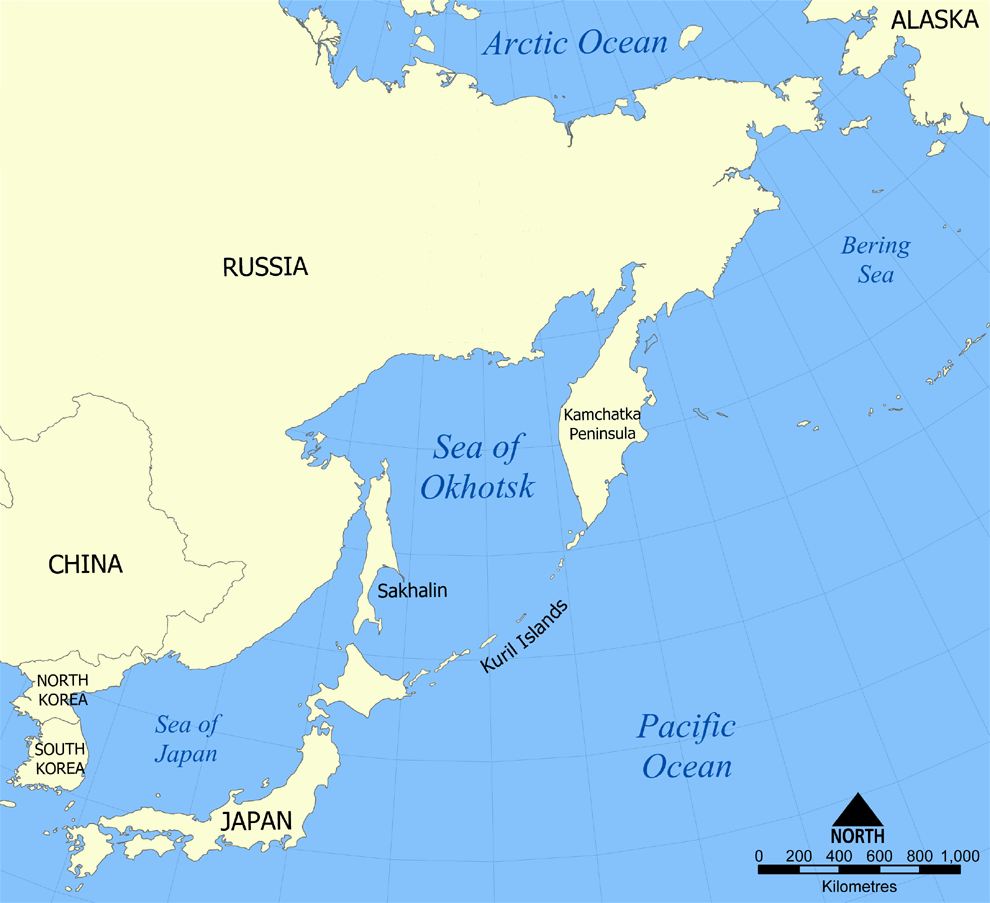
- Populations of Northeast Asia/Eurasia region showed the highest genetic affinity with the Mainland Japanese.
  Japanese people, especially the Yamato people, possess certain amounts of the "East Asian" ancestry with the percentage fluctuating from 25%, 35%, 66.7% to 80%, depending on the study. This ancestry was shown in high frequencies among immigrants during the Kofun period (300–538 CE).
  - Western Yamato Japanese, on average, have more affinities with East Asian populations, reflective of Western Japan's historic role in facilitating cross-cultural exchange with continental East Asia. Jōmon affinities peak in Northern and Southern Yamato Japanese although Northeast Yamato Japanese also exhibit close affinities with Northeast Asian populations.
  - The East Asian ancestry is often associated with the ancient Yellow River farmers populations; a common ancestry found in East Asia that is shared by the modern day Han Chinese, Tibetans, Manchus, Mongolians, Koreans, Japanese, Vietnamese, etc, in varying degrees, which in turn is classified under the Ancient Northern East Asian (ANEA) cluster that formed around 20,000–26,000 BCE. However, it is speculated that this variant of the ancestry is related to the proto-Koreanic speakers who entered Japan during the Kofun period which was assimilated by the proto-Japonic speakers of the Yayoi period based on archaeological and linguistical evidence.
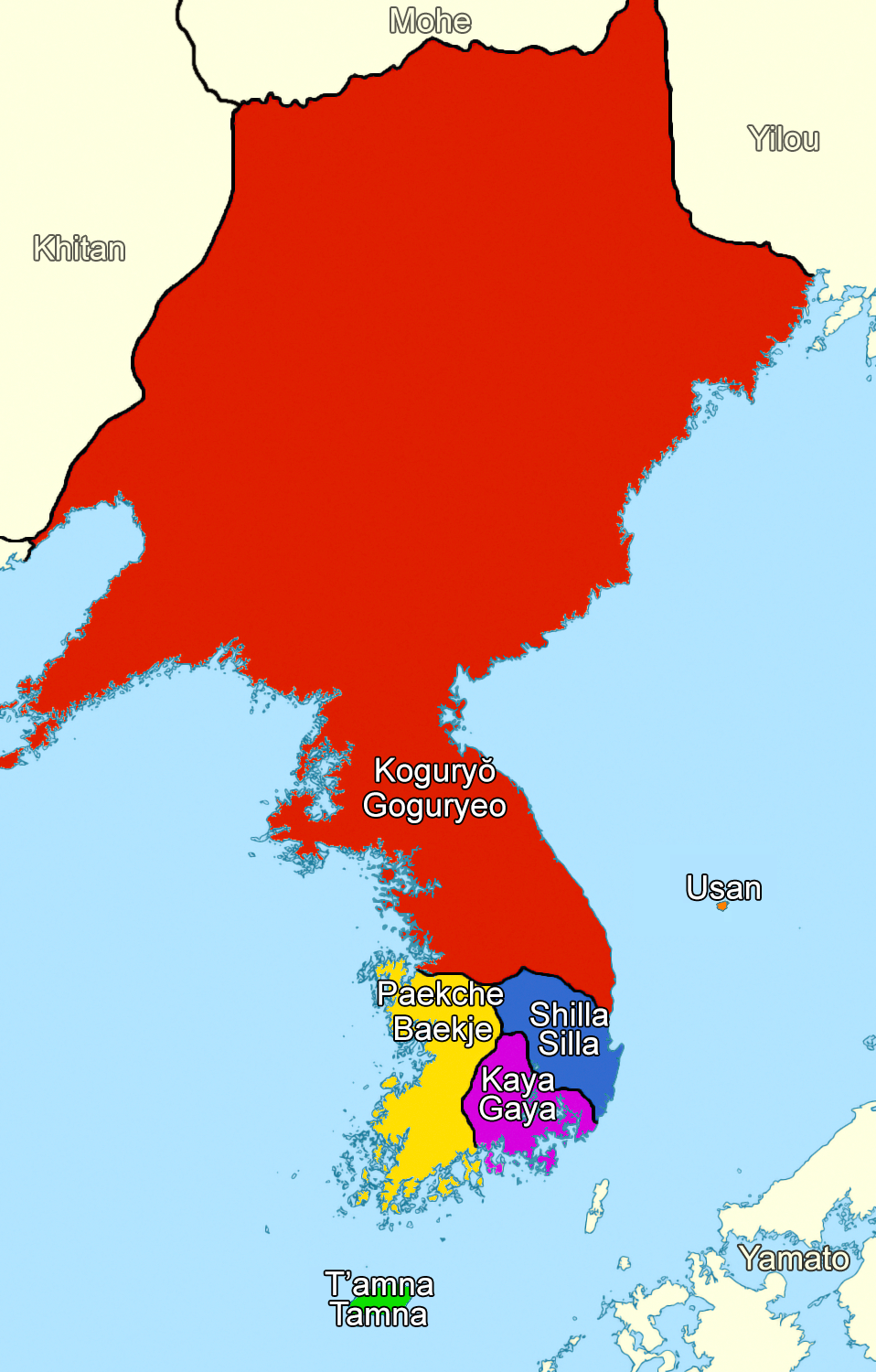
    Korea in the mid-late 5th century, middle of the Kofun period. Multiple waves of migration to Japan happened due to constant wars and political unrest.
    - According to Higasa et al. (2025), the Hondo Japanese predominantly have an ancestral component that's shared by Koreans and Northern Chinese, and to some extent, a Japanese-specific component that peaks in the Ryukyuan and Ainu subpopulations. Overall, all Japanese subpopulations share the most substantial history with the Koreans. For the Hondo Japanese, they share similar history with Northeast Eurasian populations (e.g. Ulchi, Mongolian, Yakut, and Even), as well as Oceanian populations (e.g. Igorot, Dusun, and Hawaiian).
- Immigrants from the Kofun period align closely with the Three Kingdoms period of Korea, a turbulent period of constant wars and political unrest. Genetic markers have also indicated that the Kofun period individuals bear close resemblance with the Three Kingdoms period Koreans. Also, majority of the Kofun period immigrants were from the Three Kingdoms, especially from Goguryeo, Paekche, and Silla.
- It is said that the Japanese remained homogenous since then as its modern population is almost identical to the immigrants of the Kofun period, genetically.

== Anthropometry ==
Stephen Pheasant who taught anatomy, biomechanics and ergonomics at the Royal Free Hospital and the University College, London, said that Far Eastern people have proportionately shorter lower limbs than European and black African people. Pheasant said that the proportionately short lower limbs of Far Eastern people is a difference that is most characterized in Japanese people, less characterized in Korean and Chinese people, and least characterized in Vietnamese and Thai people.

- Rajvir Yadav et al. (2000) stated the sitting height to stature ratios of different populations: South Indian (0.4922), female Indian (0.4974), Eastern Indian (0.4991), Southeastern African (0.5096), Central Indian (0.5173), US (0.5202), Western Indian (0.5243), German (0.5266) and Japanese (0.5452).
- Hirofumi Matsumura et al. (2001) and Hideo Matsumoto et al. (2009) said that the Japanese and Vietnamese people are regarded to be a mix of Northeast Asians and Southeast Asians. However, the amount of Northern genetics is higher in Japanese people compared to Vietnamese, who are closer to other Southeast Asians (Thai or Bamar people).
- Neville Moray (2005) said that, for Korean and Japanese pilots, sitting height is more than 54% of their stature, with about 46% of their stature from leg length. Moray said that, for Americans and most Europeans, sitting height is about 52% of their stature, with about 48% of their stature from leg length. Moray indicated that modifications in basic cockpit geometry are required to accommodate Japanese and Vietnamese pilots. Moray said that the Japanese have longer torsos and a higher shoulder point than the Vietnamese, but the Japanese have about similar arm lengths to the Vietnamese, so the control stick would have to be moved 8 cm closer to the pilot for the Japanese and 7 cm closer to the pilot for the Vietnamese. Moray said that, due to having shorter legs than Americans, rudder pedals must be moved closer to the pilot by 10 cm for the Japanese and 12 cm for the Vietnamese.

=== Craniometry ===
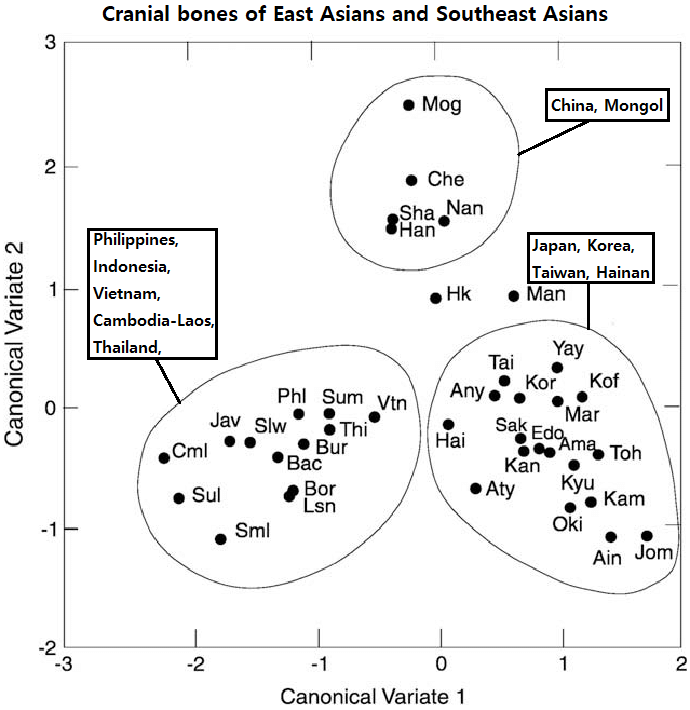
According to Pietrusewsky, the group most similar to the Japanese cranial bones were the Koreans. Meanwhile, Chinese, Mongolians and Southeast Asians were distinguished from the Japanese. (2010)

- Anthropologist Ashley Montagu (1989) said that the "Mongoloid skull generally, whether Chinese or Japanese, has been rather more neotenized than the Caucasoid or European [...]".
- Ann Kumar (1998) said that Michael Pietrusewsky (1992) said that, in a craniometric study, the cranial bones of Southeast Asians (Borneo, Vietnam, Sulu, Java, and Sulawesi etc.) are closer to Japanese, in that order, than Mongolian and Chinese populations are close to Japanese. In the craniometric study, Michael Pietrusewsky said that, even though Japanese people cluster with Mongolians, Chinese and Southeast Asians in the larger Asian cluster, the cranial bones of Japanese people are more closely aligned with several Mainland and Island Southeast Asian samples than with Mongolians and Chinese. However, Pietrusewsky also said, more research is needed on the similarity of the cranial bones between Japanese and Southeast Asians.
- In a 1994 craniometric study, Pietrusewsky found that the Japanese series, which was a series that spanned from the Yayoi period to modern times, formed a single branch with Korea. Later, Pietrusewsky (1999) found, however, significant differences between the Korean and Yayoi people in the East Asian cluster, indicating that the connection that Japanese have with Korea would not have derived from Yayoi people.
  - However, in a follow-up study, Pietrusewsky (2010) stated that East Asians and Southeast Asians were markedly separated from each other. He found that the modern Japanese cranial series was the closest to Manchurians and Koreans. To some extent, they were also close to the inhabitants of Anyang, Atayal and Mongolians. A common origin of Northeast Asians could be traced, with entry to the Japanese archipelago commencing at the start of the Yayoi period.
- Between 1996 and 1999, a team of Japanese researchers found that Yayoi remains from Yamaguchi and Fukuoka shared similarities with remains from Jiangsu, a coastal province of China.
- Park Dae-kyoon et al. (2001) said that distance analysis based on thirty-nine non-metric cranial traits showed that Koreans are closer craniometrically to Kazakhs and Mongols than to the populations in China and Japan.
- Ishida et al. (2009) states that modern mainland Japanese are phenotypically intermediate between Jōmon and Yayoi groups, supporting the dual structure model of Japan's population history. The Jōmon exhibit the most similarities with the Iron Age Tagar from southern Siberia and share similar "European-like features" whilst the Yayoi exhibit the most similarities with Northern Chinese and Neolithic Baikalians.
- Enfield (2011) sees phenotypic similarities between present Japanese populations and Dong Son populations from northern Vietnam and Neolithic populations from southern China. Based on dental analyses, they were Australo-Melanesians who heavily mixed with migrants related to ancient Chinese populations, affecting them genetically and phenotypically.
- Dudzik (2015) states that southern Japanese are morphologically the most similar to Jōmon and Ainu groups, as well as Yayoi groups. Conversely, northern Japanese are significantly more influenced by northeast Asian groups due to external migration from the north since the fifth century or earlier. This also affected subpopulations like Ainu, suggesting that 'parental population traits' were better preserved in the southernmost parts of the Japanese archipelago.
- According to Matsumura et al. (2019), Japanese belong to the wider "Northeast Asian" cluster, like modern Chinese, North and South Koreans, Mongolians and Far East Russians, including Siberians. They exhibit similar features such as relatively long flat faces and short heads, reflective of cold adaptation. However, the indigenous Jōmon hunter-gatherers exhibited similar features to prehistoric hunter-gatherers from Southeast Asia and southern China and Zhoukoudian remains from Beijing.
- According to Harrington (2020), Koreans and Japanese share similar cranial variation but Japanese are more likely to be dolichocephalic, have shorter cranial height and smaller facial features, especially in terms of their cheek height, nasal length, and facial width. However, both populations underwent brachycephalization as their societies modernized. Physical differences between modern Japanese and Koreans is also attributed to outside gene flow in Japanese but it can be explained by smaller sample sizes in the study, which didn't fully capture the variation within both populations.
- According to Watanabe et al. (2021), contemporary Kinki populations phenotypically differ the most from Jōmon people, especially Hokkaido Ainu. Other Japanese subpopulations were more intermediate although morphological similarities exist between Hokkaido Ainu and contemporary Tohoku populations.
- Several studies show quantifiable dimorphism in the cranium of Japanese people, similar to Thais, Indonesians, Filipinos and Malays. Japanese skulls also share some similarities with Hispanics and Filipinos, implied by the frequency of Hispanic skulls from southwestern United States being misclassified as Asian, particularly Japanese and Filipino. However, Japanese craniums can be distinguished from Filipino craniums, with the former having higher upper facial height and shorter inferior malar lengths on average. Nasal height and breadth were also greater and smaller than those found in Filipino craniums respectively although Thai craniums exhibited greater nasal height and breadth than those found in Japanese craniums. Japanese craniums also differ from Southeast Asian craniums by exhibiting adaptation to dry and cold climates and orbits that are more circular and rhomboid in shape. Japanese craniums also greatly differ from populations like 'typical' Western Australians, with the latter having longer and taller skulls and narrower frontal bones. On average, they also have greater maximum cranial length and basion-nasion length and lower mastoid height. However, Japanese exhibit similarities with North American populations in terms of their mandibular shape, which is attributed to their malleability after puberty or inter-individual variability within the Japanese population. Overall, population-specific facial morphology is established prenatally, beginning at the second trimester, before gradually diverging via growth-related processes.
- According to Nakao et al. (2024), there is more overlap between Kofun and Yayoi craniums than with Jōmon craniums, with Kofun craniums exhibiting high similarities with contemporary migrants from the Korean peninsula. These craniums are typically characterized by shorter anterior–posterior lengths.

== See also ==
- History of Japan
  - Jōmon people
  - Yayoi people
  - Toraijin
  - Nissen dōsoron
- Japanese people
  - Ainu people
  - Ryukyuan people
  - Yamato people
- Demographics of Japan
  - Genetic studies on Japanese Americans
  - Genetic history of East Asians#Japanese people
