= Phys.org =

Science news website

- Available in: English
- Founded: 2004; 22 years ago
- Headquarters: {{{location_country}}}
- Website: phys.org

Phys.org is an online science, research and technology news aggregator which re-publishes press releases and stories from news agencies (a business model known as churnalism). In 2012, PhysOrg.com was changed to Phys.org. As of 2014, Phys.org was posting an average of 98 items per day. It is part of the Science X network of websites, headquartered on the Isle of Man.

== See also ==
- EurekAlert!
- Science Daily
