= ScienceDaily =

American news website devoted to science

Science Daily
- Website type: Press release distribution
- Available in: English
- Owners: ScienceDaily, LLC
- Website: sciencedaily.com
- Launched: 1995; 31 years ago
- Current status: Active

ScienceDaily is an American website launched in 1995 that aggregates press releases and publishes lightly edited press releases (a practice called churnalism) about science, similar to Phys.org and EurekAlert!.

== History ==
The site was founded by married couple Dan and Michele Hogan in 1995; Dan Hogan formerly worked in the public affairs department of Jackson Laboratory writing press releases. The site makes money from selling advertisements. As of 2010, the site said that it had grown "from a two-person operation to a full-fledged news business with worldwide contributors". At the time, it was run out of the Hogans' home, had no reporters, and only reprinted press releases. In 2012, Quantcast ranked it at 614 with 2.6 million U.S. visitors.

== Sections ==
As of August 2023, ScienceDaily mainly has five sections, Health, Tech, Enviro, Society, and Quirky, the last of which includes the top news.
