= Churnalism =

Journalism based on press releases and agency stories

Churnalism is the production of low-quality or unoriginal news articles, generally by paraphrasing other sources or press releases to avoid the need for time-consuming research or fact-checking.

Churnalism is often the result of understaffed journalists who do not have the resources for original news-gathering and checking sources. Because it can quickly be churned out (and thus is less expensive to produce), churnalism has become more common due to the revenue lost with the rise of Internet news and decline in advertising, with a particularly steep fall in late 2015. The term is a portmanteau of "churn" and "journalism", referring to the perceived "churning out" of content by the press; its creation has been credited to BBC journalist Waseem Zakir.

== Prevalence ==
In his book Flat Earth News, the British journalist Nick Davies reported a study at Cardiff University by Justin Lewis and a team of researchers which found that 80% of the stories in Britain's quality press were not original and that only 12% of stories were generated by reporters. The result is a reduction of quality and accuracy, as the articles are open to manipulation and distortion.

A 2016 study of 1.8 million articles published by the U.S. and international editions of the HuffPost found that only 44% were written by staff journalists and thus could be considered original reporting.

The journalist Waseem Zakir has been credited for coining the term churnalism while working for the BBC in 2008 (however, Zakir himself recollects it being a decade earlier). According to Zakir, the trend towards this form of journalism involves reporters becoming more reactive and less proactive in searching for news: "You get copy coming in on the wires and reporters churn it out, processing stuff and maybe adding the odd local quote. It's affecting every newsroom in the country and reporters are becoming churnalists."

An editorial on the matter in the British Journalism Review saw this trend as terminal for journalism, "a harbinger of the end of news journalism as we know it, the coroner's verdict can be nothing other than suicide." Others, such as Peter Preston, former editor of The Guardian, see the issue as over-wrought, saying that there was never a golden age of journalism in which journalists were not subject to such pressures.

Nick Davies and Roy Greenslade gave evidence on the matter to the Culture, Media and Sport Committee in 2009.

Churnalism does not only occur in newspapers. For example, Chris Anderson's wide use of "writethroughs" in his book Free: The Future of a Radical Price has been labelled churnalism.

== Economic causes ==
Traditional newspapers have cut staff as their advertising revenue has declined because of competition from other media such as television and the Internet. They no longer have sufficient staff to generate news stories by making the rounds of civic and business activities. Local newspapers and trade magazines are commonly produced by only one or two staff and these rely upon stories which are increasingly brought to them by public relations representatives, according to a senior public relations professional. When the matter was debated at the Foreign Press Association, it was agreed that there was a relationship between the numbers of PR staff employed and journalists unemployed. There was a particularly steep fall in UK advertising revenue in the six months to March 2016, with the Daily Mail & General Trust issuing a warning to investors after its newspaper division reported a 29% fall in profits largely to a 13% decline in print advertising revenue; news media commentator Roy Greenslade said in response to this "print cliff fall" that newspapers had no future.

Other commentators have said the modern journalism is increasingly being performed in a cheaper, high-volume way, describing the resulting product with derogatory terms such as newszak (combination of "news" and "muzak"), infotainment and junk-food journalism.

== Speed ==
In their book No Time to Think, authors Howard Rosenberg and Charles S. Feldman emphasised the prioritization of speed in degrading the quality of modern journalism. An example is given of the BBC guide for online staff which gives advice to ensure good quality but also the contradictory advice, "Get the story up as fast as you can ... We encourage a sense of urgency—we want to be first."

== Combating churnalism ==
Some organizations and tools have arisen to combat churnalism. In April 2013, the American Sunlight Foundation, a non-profit organisation that advocates for openness and transparency, in partnership with the UK's Media Standards Trust, launched churnalism.com, an online tool to discover churn. It used a database of known press releases and compared the text of a submitted URL to determine what percentage of it was derived churn.

The Register commented that some level of "churnalism" is both normal and healthy for news organisations, but said it considered the Media Standards Trust linked to campaigns supported by "wealthy and powerful individuals and celebrities" in favour of "state control of the media" in the UK, and claimed there was significant irony in the Sunlight Foundation tool launch announcement itself being "uncritically churned by many of the usual suspects".

In Australia, ABC, the nationwide public TV service, airs a highly critical weekly 15-minute programme, Media Watch, which regularly exposes churnalism, plagiarism, media bias and unethical behaviour by journalists and radio talk-back hosts.

== See also ==
- 24-hour news cycle
- Automated journalism
- Circular reporting
- Content farm
- Hack writer
- National Automobile Chamber of Commerce – one-time supplier of pre-written articles to US newspapers
- Pink-slime journalism – Practice of publishing poor-quality outsourced reports as local news
- Propaganda model#Sourcing
- Video news release
