= Nick Davies =

British journalist and writer (born 1953)

- Born: 28 March 1953 (age 73)
- Occupations: Journalist, writer, documentary maker
- Writing career
- Period: 1976–present
- Genres: Journalism, politics
- Notable works: Dark Heart: The Story of a Journey into an Undiscovered Britain (1998); The School Report (2000); Flat Earth News (2008); Hack Attack: How the Truth Caught Up with Rupert Murdoch (2014)
- Notable awards: Martha Gellhorn Prize for Journalism 1999; British Press Awards Reporter of the Year, 2000; Paul Foot Award 2011
- Website: www.nickdavies.net

Nick Davies (born 28 March 1953) is a British investigative journalist, writer, and documentary maker.

Davies has written extensively as a freelancer, as well as for The Guardian and The Observer, and been named Reporter of the Year, Journalist of the Year and Feature Writer of the Year at the British Press Awards.

Davies has written numerous books on the subject of politics and journalism, including Flat Earth News, which attracted considerable controversy as an exposé of journalistic malpractice in the UK and around the globe. As a reporter for The Guardian, Davies was responsible for uncovering the News of the World phone hacking scandal.

== Career in journalism ==
Davies gained a PPE degree from Oxford University in 1974, and started his journalism career in 1976, working as a trainee for the Mirror Group in Plymouth. He then moved to London initially to work for the Sunday People and spent a year working for The Evening Standard before becoming a news reporter at The Guardian in July 1979. Since then he has worked as home affairs correspondent at The Observer; chief feature writer at London Daily News in 1986 and on-screen reporter for World in Action and Channel 4's Dispatches. After the London Daily News folded he moved to the United States for a year, where he wrote White Lies, about the wrongful conviction of a black janitor, Clarence Brandley, for the murder of a white girl. From 1989 Davies was a freelance reporter for The Guardian, for which he contributed articles, working from his home in Sussex. He was the winner of the first Martha Gellhorn Prize for Journalism in 1999.

Following the publication of Flat Earth News and a Guardian story co-written by Davies claiming that News of the World journalists tapped private mobile phones to get stories, on 14 July 2009 Davies told the Culture, Media and Sport Select Committee that the Metropolitan Police Service had done too little to investigate the claims. The Guardian coverage also led to calls from high-profile MPs for the dismissal of Andy Coulson, communications director for the Conservative Party. Davies received the Paul Foot Award 2011 for his work on this story.

Davies's book on the News International phone hacking scandal, Hack Attack: How the Truth Caught Up with Rupert Murdoch, was released in August 2014.

Davies is played by David Tennant in the 2025 ITV drama about the phone hacking scandal, The Hack.

== Critical reaction to Flat Earth News ==
Flat Earth News was greeted in the London Review of Books on its publication as "a genuinely important book, one which is likely to change, permanently, the way anyone who reads it looks at the British newspaper industry". The LRB highlighted the analysis showing that 60% of the content of UK papers was based mainly on wire copy or press releases, a practice Davies called "churnalism", while only 12% are original stories and only 12% of stories showed evidence that the central statement had been corroborated. Mary Riddell in The Observer disputed some of the charges against British journalism in the book, and described it as "unduly pessimistic".

Peter Oborne in The Spectator concentrated on the use of illegal techniques to invade privacy rather than declining standards, describing Flat Earth News as "hypnotically readable" and praising the collection of evidence that the practice of journalism is "bent", although qualifying this somewhat by suggesting that Davies "ignores a great deal [of journalism] that is salient and good".

== Awards ==
- British Press Awards Reporter of the Year, 2000; Journalist of the Year and Feature Writer of the Year.
- Martha Gellhorn Prize for Journalism, 1999.
- Paul Foot Award 2011, for a series of articles that helped to expose the scale of phone-hacking at the News of the World. (Davies was also nominated for the award the previous year.)

== Bibliography ==
- Davies, Nick (1991). White Lies: The story of how one man's fight for life exposed the hidden truth of American racism. London: Chatto & Windus. ISBN 978-0-7011-3724-3.
- — (1993). Murder on Ward Four: the story of Bev Allitt and the most terrifying crime since the Moors Murders. London: Chatto & Windus. ISBN 978-0-7011-4813-3.
- — (1997). Dark Heart: The shocking truth about hidden Britain. London: Chatto & Windus. ISBN 978-0-7011-6351-8.
- — (2000). The School Report: Why Britain's schools are failing. London: Vintage. ISBN 978-0-09-942216-7.
- — (2008). Flat Earth News: An Award-winning Reporter Exposes Falsehood, Distortion and Propaganda in the Global Media. London: Chatto & Windus. ISBN 978-0-7011-8145-1.
- — (2014). Hack Attack: The inside story of how the truth caught up with Rupert Murdoch (First American ed.). New York: Faber & Faber. ISBN 978-0-86547-881-7.

== See also ==
- Metropolitan Police role in the news media phone hacking scandal
- News media phone hacking scandal reference lists
- Clarence Brandley
- Beverley Allitt
