= The World Is Flat (disambiguation) =

The World Is Flat is a 2005 book written by Thomas Friedman.

The World Is Flat may also refer to:

- The World Is Flat (album), 2002 album by The Montgolfier Brothers
- "The World Is Flat" (song), 1997 song by Echobelly

== See also ==
- Flat Earth (disambiguation)
