= Flat Earth News =

Flat Earth News may refer to:

- Flat Earth News (journal), the 1977–1981 journal of the Flat Earth Society
- Flat Earth News (book), a 2008 non-fiction book by Nick Davies
