= Genetic and anthropology studies on Filipinos =

DNA analysis of Filipino populations

Various genetic and anthropology studies have been performed on Filipinos to analyze the population genetics of the various ethnic groups in the Philippines.

The results of a DNA study conducted by the National Geographic's "The Genographic Project", based on genetic testings of Filipino people by the National Geographic in 2008–2009, found that the Philippines is made up of around 54% Southeast Asia and Oceania, 36% East Asian, 5% Southern European, 3% South Asian and 2% Native American genes.

== Origins ==
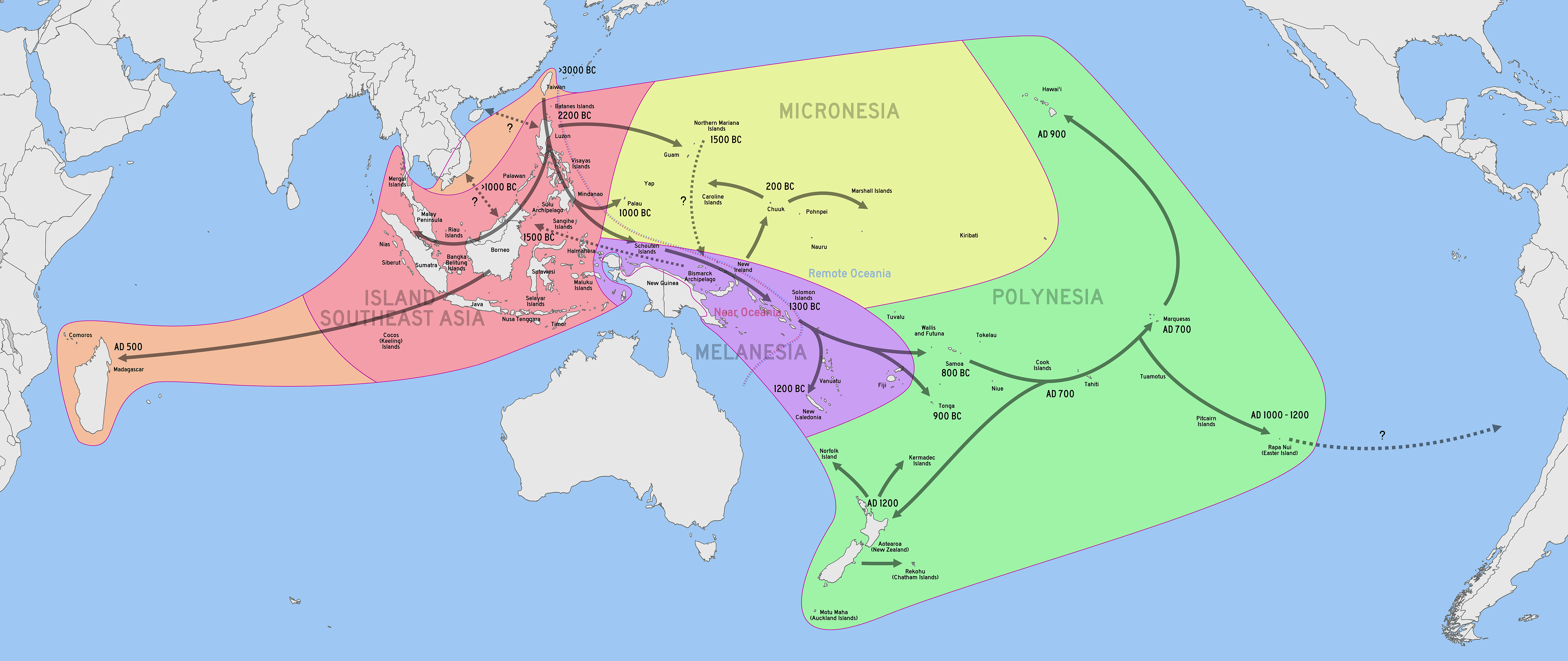
A chronological map of the Austronesian expansion.

The first Austronesians reached the Philippines at around 2200 BC, settling the Batanes Islands and northern Luzon. From there, they rapidly spread downwards to the rest of the islands of the Philippines and Southeast Asia, as well as voyaging further east to reach the Northern Mariana Islands by around 1500 BC. They assimilated the older Negrito groups which arrived during the Paleolithic, resulting in the modern Filipino ethnic groups which all display various ratios of genetic admixture between Austronesian and Negrito groups.

A 2008 genetic study by Leeds University and published in Molecular Biology and Evolution, showed that mitochondrial DNA lineages have been evolving within Maritime Southeast Asia since modern humans arrived approximately 50,000 years ago. The authors concluded that it was proof that Austronesians evolved within Island Southeast Asia and did not come from Taiwan (the "Out-of-Sundaland" hypothesis). Population dispersals occurred at the same time as sea levels rose, which resulted in migrations from the Philippine Islands into Taiwan within the last 10,000 years.

These have been repudiated by a 2014 study published by Nature using whole genome sequencing (instead of only mtDNA) which has found that all ISEA populations had genes originating from the aboriginal Taiwanese. Contrary to the claim of a south-to-north migration in the "Out-of-Sundaland" hypothesis, the new whole genome analysis strongly confirms the north-to-south dispersal of the Austronesian peoples in the prevailing "Out-of-Taiwan" hypothesis. The researchers further pointed out that while humans have been living in Sundaland for at least 40,000 years, the Austronesian people were recent arrivals. The results of the 2008 study failed to take into account admixture with the more ancient but unrelated Negrito and Papuan populations.

A 2021 study states that the Philippines faced five migratory waves, with the first being led by Northern and Southern Negritos, who were distantly related to Australian and Papuan groups. The next wave was led by Manobo and Sama, who populated the southern Philippines. The Sama show high genetic affinities with Austroasiatic-speaking groups in Mainland Southeast Asia such as Mlabri and Htin and diverged from a common East Asian branch before Han, Dai, and Kinh split from Amis, Atayal, or Cordillerans.

The latest wave was led by the Cordillerans, who settled in the Cordilleran mountain range of north-central Luzon. They mixed with the older Negrito populations although Southern Negritos received additional Papuan-related ancestry. central Cordillerans show no admixture with Negritos despite extensive interaction with their neighbors. The study also found evidence of Northeast Asian ancestry, originating from the coastal China/Taiwan area, being dispersed into the Batanes Islands and coastal regions of Luzon. Overall, all Filipino ethnic groups share more alleles with Cordillerans than with Austronesians like Ami or Atayal, who display some admixture with Austroasiatic-related and Northeast Asian-related groups. Also included is haplogroup H1a, that came from South Asian sources.

There is evidence of low-lying European ancestry in individuals from Bolinao, Cebuano, Ibaloi, Itabayaten, Ilocano, Ivatan, Kapampangan, Pangasinan, and Yogad groups, dating back to the Spanish colonial period. They are also present in some urbanized lowlanders, Bicolanos and Spanish Creole-speaking Chavacanos. Nonetheless, Filipino demography remains relatively unaffected by Spanish colonialism compared to other colonies.

== Y-DNA haplogroups ==
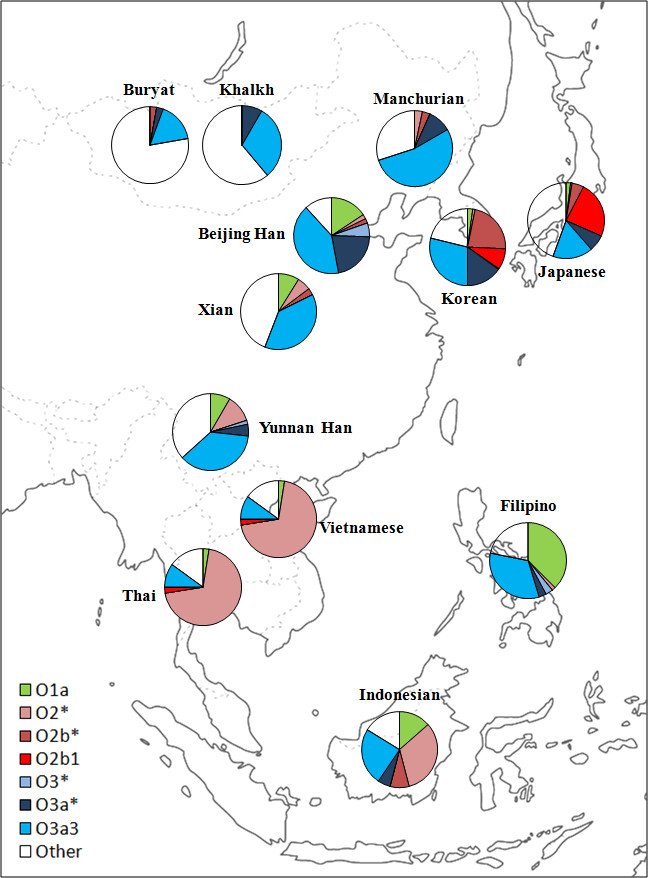
The distribution of Y haplogroup O lineages in East Asia

The most frequently occurring Y-DNA haplogroups among modern Filipinos are haplogroup O1a-M119, which has been found with maximal frequency among the indigenous peoples of Nias, the Mentawai Islands, northern Luzon, the Batanes, and Taiwan, and Haplogroup O2-M122, which is found with high frequency in many populations of East Asia, Southeast Asia, and Polynesia.

In particular, the type of O2-M122 that is found frequently among Filipinos in general, O-P164(xM134), is also found frequently in other Austronesian populations, including Polynesians. Trejaut et al. 2014 found O2a2b-P164(xO2a2b1-M134) in 26/146 = 17.8% of a pool of samples of Filipinos (4/8 = 50% Mindanao, 7/31 = 22.6% Visayas, 10/55 = 18.2% South Luzon, 1/6 = 17% North Luzon, 2/22 = 9.1% unknown Philippines, 2/24 = 8.3% Ivatan).

The distributions of other subclades of O2-M122 in the Philippines were sporadic, but it may be noted that O2a1b-JST002611 was observed in 6/24 = 25% of a sample of Ivatan and 1/31 = 3.2% of a sample from the Visayas, O2a2a1a2-M7 was observed in 1/6 = 17% of a sample from North Luzon, 1/55 = 1.8% of a sample from South Luzon, and 1/31 = 3.2% of a sample from the Visayas, and O2a2b1a1a-M133 was observed in 2/31 = 6.5% of a sample from the Visayas. A total of 45/146 = 30.8% of the sampled Filipinos were found to belong to Haplogroup O2-M122.

In a study by Delfin et al. (2011), 21.1% (8/38) of a sample of highlanders of northern Luzon (17 Bugkalot, 12 Kalanguya, 6 Kankanaey, 2 Ibaloi, and 1 Ifugao) were found to belong to haplogroup O2a2a1a2-M7, which is outside of the O2a2b-P164 clade and is uncommon among Austronesian-speaking populations, being rather frequently observed among speakers of Hmong-Mien, Katuic, and Bahnaric languages in southwestern China and eastern Mainland Southeast Asia. (Delfin et al. also observed O-M7 in 5/39 = 12.8% of a sample of Agta from Iriga in southeastern Luzon and 5/36 = 13.9% of a sample of Ati from Panay.)

Haplogroup O1a-M119 is also commonly found among Filipinos (25/146 = 17.1% O1a-M119(xO1a1a-P203, O1a2-M50), 20/146 = 13.7% O1a1a-P203, 17/146 = 11.6% O1a2-M50, 62/146 = 42.5% O1a-M119 total according to Trejaut et al. 2014) and is shared with other Austronesian-speaking populations, especially those in Taiwan, western Indonesia, and Madagascar.

=== Haplogroups R-M343 and I-M253 ===
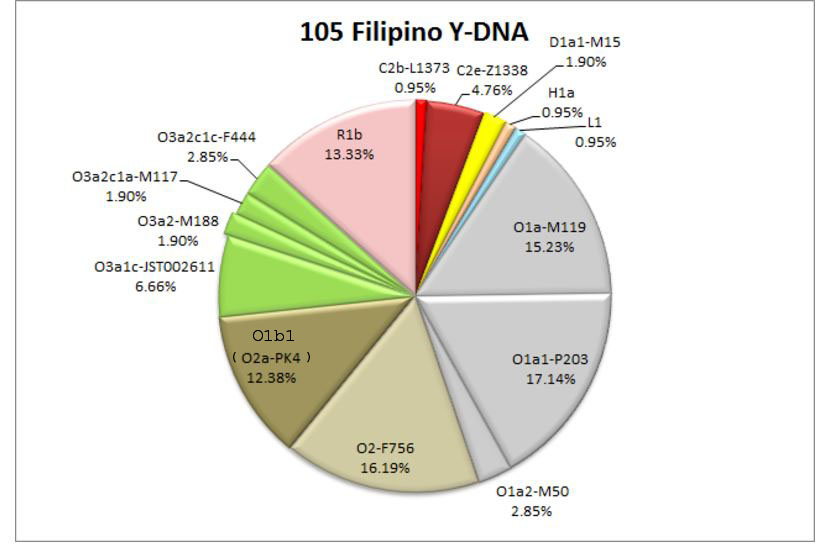
The most common Y-DNA Haplogroup type is O, which Filipinos share with Chinese and fellow Southeast Asians. The South Asian Y-DNA H1a (H-L901) indicate the presence of Indians. The 13% frequency of European Y-DNA R1b (R-M343) is evidence of Spanish immigration.

After the 16th century, the colonial period saw the influx of genetic influence from other populations. This is evidenced by the presence of a small percentage of the Y-DNA Haplogroup R1b (R-M343) present among the population of the Philippines. DNA studies vary as to how small these lineages are. A 2001 study conducted by Stanford University Asia-Pacific Research Center stated that 3.6% of the Philippine population had European Y-DNA.

This is contrasted by genetic studies done by Applied Biosystems and FamilyTreeDNA, wherein the R1b Y-DNA Haplotype common in Spain and Western Europe was detected among 12-13% of the sample size of Filipinos, which had come to the area, via immigration from Spain and Latin America. Haplogroup I1 (I-M253), which came from Germanic Europeans and had spread to the Philippines mostly from Anglo-America (USA), represented about 0.95% of the sample size. Also included is haplogroup H1a (H-L901), that came from South Asian sources.

A 2015 genetic study by the Kaiser Permanente (KP) Research Program on Genes, Environment, and Health (RPGEH), substantial number of Californian residents self-identifying as Filipinos sampled have "modest" amounts of European ancestry consistent with older admixture. Therefore implying that the mostly native majority population of the Philippines, still possess Spanish admixture in their genetics in minor percentages per person.

A 2021 analysis of the full autosomal genome of 1,082 individuals from the Philippines has shown that "in contrast to several other Spanish-colonized regions, Philippine demography appears to have remained largely unaffected by admixture with Europeans" (Larena et al. 2021). European admixture is found at a low level among individuals from lowland groups such as Ilocanos and Cebuanos, and reaches significant population-wide levels among urbanized lowlanders (who form half the population of the country), Bicolanos and Chavacano-speaking Mestizos.

=== Haplogroup Q-M242 ===
A 2011 study found that the Y-DNA of 2 out of 64 sampled Filipino males belonged to Haplogroup Q-M242, which has its highest frequency among Native Americans, Asian Siberians, and in Central Asians. Coincidentally, it is in a similar percentage to the previously mentioned National Geographic study, which stated that 2% of the population is Native American.

== Anthropology ==
=== Craniometry ===
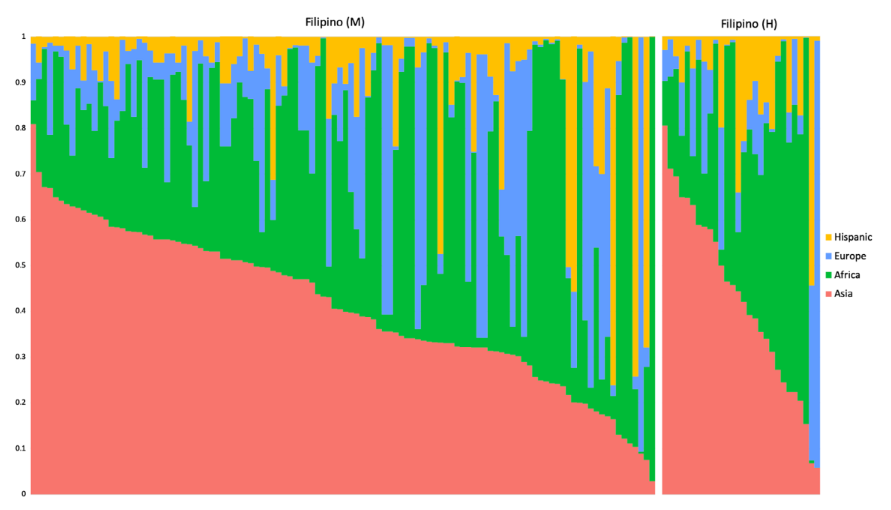
A Craniometric Racial Graph of Filipinos (using Historical samples and Modern samples) by Matthew C. Go. Structure map showing estimated ancestry proportions for the historical (H) and modern (M) Filipino populations when shown using the posterior group membership probability for reference pools that are Hispanic, Asian, European, and African. Every person is symbolized by a single vertical line divided into four segments of varying colors, each of which represents the estimated ancestry elements. The posterior probability value is the length of the colored section. The people are arranged in decreasing order according to their amount of estimated Asian heritage.

Scientist, Matthew C. Go, in a Trihybrid Ancestry Variation Analysis approach to Admixture in Filipinos, published a study wherein it was discovered that upon exhuming the remains around the public cemetery of the "Manila North Cemetery" as well as other public cemeteries across the Philippines, and practicing forensic anthropology on them, Matthew C. Go estimated that 71% of the mean amount, among the samples exhumed, have attribution to Asian descent while 7% is attributable to European descent. Filipinos have significantly less Asian ancestry compared to other Asian nationalities like the Koreans who are 90% Asian, Japanese at 96%, Thai at 93%, and Vietnamese at 84%.

Nevertheless, a 2019 Anthropology Study by Beatrix Dudzik and also Matthew Go, while using skeletons collated by the University of the Philippines and sampled from all across the Philippines, thus published in the Journal of Human Biology, using physical anthropology, estimated that, 72.7% of Filipinos are Asian, 12.7% of Filipinos can be classified as Hispanic, 7.3% as Indigenous American, African at 4.5% and European at 2.7%.

This is only according to an interpretation of the data wherein the reference groups, which were attributed to the Filipino samples; for the Hispanic category, were Mexican-Americans, and the reference groups for the European, African, and Indigenous American, categories, were: White Americans, Black Americans, and Native Americans from the USA, while the Asian reference groups were sourced from Chinese, Japanese, and Vietnamese origins.

In contrast, a different anthropology study using Morphoscopic ancestry estimates in Filipino crania using multivariate probit regression models by J. T. Hefner and also Matthew C. Go, published on year 2020, while analyzing Historic and Modern samples of skeletons in the Philippines, paint a different picture, in that, when the reference group for "Asian" was Thailand (Southeast Asians) rather than Chinese, Japanese, and Vietnamese; and the reference group for "Hispanic" were Colombians (South Americans) rather than Mexicans, the combined historical and modern sample results for Filipinos, yielded the following ratios: Asian at 48.6%, African at 32.9%, and only a small portion classifying as either European at 12.9%, and finally for Hispanic at 5.7%.

=== Population Data ===
As for the general population of the Philippines, there are several data points elucidating that the Philippine population is racially diverse.

==== Mexican Filipinos ====
Of the Mexican ancestry in Filipinos, there are records to distill their general number, according to Stephanie Mawson in her 2014 M.Phil thesis entitled Between Loyalty and Disobedience: The Limits of Spanish Domination in the Seventeenth Century Pacific. In the 1600s, thousands of Latin American settlers were sent to the Philippines by the Spaniards per year. Around that time frame, the Spaniards had cumulatively sent 15,600 settlers from Peru and Mexico while there were only 600 Spaniards from Spain, that supplemented a Philippine population of only 667,612 people.

Due to the initial low population count, people of Latin American and Hispanic descent quickly spread across the territory. Several hundred Tlaxcalan soldiers sailed to the islands in the 16th century, with some settling permanently and contributing numerous Nahuatl words to the Filipino languages. It was royal policy to use Peruvian and Mexican soldiers as colonists to the Philippines.

Geographic distribution and year of settlement of the Latin-American immigrant soldiers assigned to the Philippines in the 1600s.
| Location | 1603 | 1636 | 1642 | 1644 | 1654 | 1655 | 1670 | 1672 |
|---|---|---|---|---|---|---|---|---|
| Manila | 900 | 446 | — | 407 | 821 | 799 | 708 | 667 |
| Fort Santiago | — | 22 | — | — | 50 | — | 86 | 81 |
| Cavite | — | 70 | — | — | 89 | — | 225 | 211 |
| Cagayan | 46 | 80 | — | — | — | — | 155 | 155 |
| Calamianes | — | — | — | — | — | — | 73 | 73 |
| Caraga | — | 45 | — | — | — | — | 81 | 81 |
| Cebu | 86 | 50 | — | — | — | — | 135 | 135 |
| Formosa | — | 180 | — | — | — | — | — | — |
| Moluccas | 80 | 480 | 507 | — | 389 | — | — | — |
| Otón | 66 | 50 | — | — | — | — | 169 | 169 |
| Zamboanga | — | 210 | — | — | 184 | — | — | — |
| Other | 255 | — | — | — | — | — | — | — |
| | — | — | — | — | — | — | — | — |
| Total Reinforcements | 1,533 | 1,633 | 2,067 | 2,085 | n/a | n/a | 1,632 | 1,572 |

The book Intercolonial Intimacies Relinking Latin/o America to the Philippines, 1898–1964 by Paula C. Park cites "Forzados y reclutas: los criollos novohispanos en Asia (1756-1808)" gave a higher number of later Mexican soldier-immigrants to the Philippines, pegging the number at 35,000 immigrants in the 1700s, in a Philippine population which was only around 1.5 Million, thus forming 2.33% of the population.

==== Spanish Filipinos ====
In 1799, Friar Manuel Buzeta estimated the population of all the Philippine islands as 1,502,574. Despite the number of Mixed Spanish-Filipino descent being the lowest, they may be more common than expected as many Spaniards often had Filipino concubines and mistresses and they frequently produced children out of wedlock.

In the late 1700s to early 1800s, Joaquín Martínez de Zúñiga, an Agustinian Friar, in his Two Volume Book: "Estadismo de las islas Filipinas" compiled a census of the Spanish-Philippines based on the tribute counts (Which represented an average family of seven to ten children and two parents, per tribute) and came upon the following statistics:

Data reported for the 1800 as divided by ethnicity and province
| Province | Native Tributes | Spanish Mestizo Tributes | All Tributes (Note: Including others such as Latin-Americans and Chinese-Mestizos, pure Chinese paid tribute but were not Philippine citizens as they were transients who returned to China, and Spaniards were exempt) |
|---|---|---|---|
| Tondo | 14,437-1/2 | 3,528 | 27,897-7 |
| Cavite | 5,724-1/2 | 859 | 9,132-4 |
| Laguna | 14,392-1/2 | 336 | 19,448-6 |
| Batangas | 15,014 | 451 | 21,579-7 |
| Mindoro | 3,165 | 3-1/2 | 4,000-8 |
| Bulacan | 16,586-1/2 | 2,007 | 25,760-5 |
| Pampanga | 16,604-1/2 | 2,641 | 27,358-1 |
| Bataan | 3,082 | 619 | 5,433 |
| Zambales | 1,136 | 73 | 4,389 |
| Ilocos | 44,852-1/2 | 631 | 68,856 |
| Pangasinan | 19,836 | 719-1/2 | 25,366 |
| Cagayan | 9,888 | 0 | 11,244-6 |
| Camarines | 19,686-1/2 | 154-1/2 | 24,994 |
| Albay | 12,339 | 146 | 16,093 |
| Tayabas | 7,396 | 12 | 9,228 |
| Cebu | 28,112-1/2 | 625 | 28,863 |
| Samar | 3,042 | 103 | 4,060 |
| Leyte | 7,678 | 37-1/2 | 10,011 |
| Caraga | 3,497 | 0 | 4,977 |
| Misamis | 1,278 | 0 | 1,674 |
| Negros Island | 5,741 | 0 | 7,176 |
| Iloilo | 29,723 | 166 | 37,760 |
| Capiz | 11,459 | 89 | 14,867 |
| Antique | 9,228 | 0 | 11,620 |
| Calamianes | 2,289 | 0 | 3,161 |
| TOTAL | 299,049 | 13,201 | 424,992-16 |

The Spanish-Filipino population as a proportion of the provinces widely varied; with as high as 19% of the population of Tondo province (The most populous province and former name of Manila), to Pampanga 13.7%, Cavite at 13%, Laguna 2.28%, Batangas 3%, Bulacan 10.79%, Bataan 16.72%, Ilocos 1.38%, Pangasinan 3.49%, Albay 1.16%, Cebu 2.17%, Samar 3.27%, Iloilo 1%, Capiz 1%, Bicol 20%, and Zamboanga 40%. According to the data, in the Archdiocese of Manila which administers much of Luzon under it, about 10% of the population was Spanish-Filipino. Summing up all the provinces including those with no Spanish Filipinos, all in all, in the total population of the Philippines, mixed Spanish-Filipinos composed 5% of the population.

Afterwards there was a later census, compiled and published in the year 1818, conducted by Buzeta and Bravo; that rather than was a travelling account was a systematic compilation of baptismal and tribute records, as outlined below.

Felipe Bravo Census Demographics (Albay, 1818)
| Provinces | Pueblos | Native Families | Spanish Filipino Families | Negrito Families | Chinese Filipino Families |
|---|---|---|---|---|---|
| Albay | Albay, Cabicera | 5,515 | | 2 | 2 |
| | Manito | 240 | 4 | | |
| | Bacon | 2,119 | 45 | | |
| | Cuba | 2,162 | 52 | | |
| | Casiguran | 1,025 | 28 | | |
| | Juban | 396 | 18 | | |
| | Sorsogon | 1,783 | 149 | | |
| | Bulusan | 1,777 | 19 | | |
| | Bulan | 714 | 16 | | |
| | Donsol | 241 | | | |
| | Quipia | 269 | | | |
| | Lilog | 821 | 33 | 23 | |
| | Bacacay | 1,295 | 77 | | |
| | Malilipot | 981 | 53 | | |
| | Tabaco | 3,347 | 225 | | |
| | Malitao | 2,844 | 241 | | |
| | Tibi | 2,069 | 157 | 110 | |
| | Lagonoy y su anejo | 1,669 | 18 | 521 | |
| | San Jose | 1,829 | 114 | 470 | |
| | Caramoan | 641 | | 72 | |
| Total | | 31,737 | 1,249 | 1,198 | 2 |

Felipe Bravo Census Demographics (Isla De Ticao, 1818)
| Provinces | Pueblos | Native Families | Spanish Filipino Families | Negrito Families | Chinese Filipino Families |
|---|---|---|---|---|---|
| Isla de Ticao | San Jacinto | 266 | 8 | | |
| Total | | 266 | 8 | | |

Felipe Bravo Census Demographics (Isla De Masbate, 1818)
| Provinces | Pueblos | Native Families | Spanish Filipino Families | Negrito Families | Chinese Filipino Families |
|---|---|---|---|---|---|
| Isla de Masbate | Mobo | 912 | 1 | | |
| Total | | 912 | 1 | | |

Felipe Bravo Census Demographics (Isla De Catanduanes, 1818)
| Provinces | Pueblos | Native Families | Spanish Filipino Families | Negrito Families | Chinese Filipino Families |
|---|---|---|---|---|---|
| Isla De Catanduanes | Virac | 1,581 | 91 | | |
| | Calolbon | 847 | 3 | | |
| | Eiga | 847 | 3 | | |
| | Payo y sus anejos Bagamanoc y Ooc | 644 | 17 | | |
| | Pandan y Caramoan | 489 | 2 | | |
| Total | | 4,408 | 116 | | |

Felipe Bravo Census Demographics (Antique, 1818)
| Provinces | Pueblos | Native Families | Spanish Filipino Families | Chinese Filipino Families |
|---|---|---|---|---|
| Antique | San José de Buenavista, cabecera | 5,925 | 6 | |
| | San Pedro de Balbalan | 2,247 | | |
| | Sibalom | 4,665 | 2 | |
| | Patnongon y su visita Coritan | 2,097 | 3 | |
| | Bugason | 3,060 | 1 | |
| | San Antonio de Nalupa, su anejo Culari y visitas Tibiao, Bitad, Tun, Bacafan y Batunan | 2,542 | 19 | |
| | Pandan | 300 | | |
| | Antique | 2,304 | 12 | |
| | Dao | 1,296 | 7 | |
| | Cagayan Chico en la isla del mismo nombre | 527 | | |
| Total | (Across the Province) | 24,963 | 50 | 40 |

Felipe Bravo Census Demographics (Bataan, 1818)
| Provinces | Pueblos | Native Families | Spanish Filipino Families | Moreno Filipino Families | Negro (Black) Filipino Families | Chinese Filipino Families |
|---|---|---|---|---|---|---|
| Bataan | Balanga, cabecera | 1,608 | 12 | | 18 | 8 |
| | Abucay | 1,406 | 20 | | 3 | 5 |
| | Samar | 1,000 | 4 | | 1 | |
| | Orani | 1,000 | 25 | | | 8 |
| | Llana-Hermosa | 716 | 1 | | | |
| | San Juan de Dinalupijan | 451 | 19 | | 7 | 3 |
| | Pilar | 899 | | | | |
| | Mariveles y su visita Morong | 1,522 | 3 | 1 | 5 | |
| | Orion ú Odiong | 1,550 | 8 | 2 | 18 | 3 |
| Total | | 10,152 | 92 | 3 | 52 | 27 |

Felipe Bravo Census Demographics (Batangas, 1818)
| Provinces | Pueblos | Native Families | Spanish Filipino Families | Chinese Filipino Families |
|---|---|---|---|---|
| Batangas | Balayan, cabecera. | 4,521 | 22 | |
| | Lian. | 629 | 7 | |
| | Nasugbů. | 866 | | 2 |
| | Rosario | 1,758 | 4 | |
| | Santo Tomas. | 1,256 | | |
| | San Pablo de los Montes | 1,948 | 7 | |
| | Taal | 8,312 | | |
| | Baoan ó Banang | 5,813 | | |
| | Batangas | 6,889 | | |
| | San José | 2,427 | | |
| | Tanauan. | 2,106 | | |
| | Lipa | 4,104 | | |
| Total | | 40,629 | 40 | 2 |

Felipe Bravo Census Demographics (Bulacan, 1818)
| Provinces | Pueblos | Native Families | Spanish Filipino Families | Converted Negro Families | Chinese Filipino Families |
|---|---|---|---|---|---|
| Bulacan | Bulacan, cabecera. | 5,200 | | | |
| | Bigáa. | 1,876 | | | |
| | Guiguinto. | 1,291 | | | |
| | Malolos. | 8,110 | | | |
| | Paombon. | 1,058 | | | |
| | Hagonoy. | 4,572 | | | |
| | Calumpít. | 2,628 | | | |
| | Quingua. | 2,912 | | | |
| | San Isidro. | 2,560 | | | |
| | Baliuag. | 4,296 | | | |
| | San Rafael. | 1,650 | 10 | | |
| | Angat. | 5,441 | | | |
| | San José. | 219 | | | |
| | Santa María de Pandi. | 1,588 | 17 | | |
| | Bocaue. | 2,550 | 88 | | 2 |
| | Marilao. | 881 | 28 | 5 | 1 |
| | Meycauayan. | 2,375 | 46 | | |
| | Polo. | 3,160 | 44 | | 4 |
| | Obando. | 2,493 | | | |
| Total | | 54,360 | 233 | 5 | 7 |

Felipe Bravo Census Demographics (Cagayan, 1818)
| Province | Pueblo | Native Families | Spanish Filipino Families |
|---|---|---|---|
| Cagayan | Lal-lo, cabecera. | 975 | 313 |
| | Camalaniugan. | 1,156 | |
| | Piat y su visita. | 899 | |
| | Tabang.. | 201 | |
| | Cabagan. | 3,543 | |
| | Malaveg con su visita Mabanaug. | 524 | |
| | Tuao.. | 1,393 | |
| | Iguig y su visita Amulong. | 403 | |
| | Tuguegarao. | 5,072 | |
| | Aparri.. | 1,715 | |
| | Abulug. | 1,162 | 1 |
| | San Juan y su visita Masi. | 913 | |
| | Nasiping y su visita Gataran. | 573 | |
| | Ilagan.. | 1,150 | |
| | Gamú y su visita Furao. | 586 | 16 |
| | Tumauini. | 827 | |
| | Bugay.. | 299 | |
| | Aritao.. | 580 | |
| | Dupax. | 867 | 6 |
| | Bambang.. | 893 | |
| | Bayombong. | 771 | |
| | Lumabang. | 332 | |
| | Bagabag y su Fuerza. | 508 | |
| | Carig y su Fortaleza el Sto. Niño. | 305 | |
| | Camarag. | 488 | |
| | Angadanan. | 320 | |
| | Cauayan. | 318 | |
| | Calaniugan. | 135 | |
| TOTAL | | 26,726 | 336 |

Felipe Bravo Census Demographics (Calamianes, 1818)
| Province | Pueblo | Native Families | Spanish Filipino Families |
|---|---|---|---|
Islas de Calamianes
| Calamianes | Culion en la de Calamianes, Isla de Linacapan, e Isla de Coron. | 1,044 | 2 |
Isla de Paragua
| | Taytay, Silanga, Meitejet, Pancol, Guinlo, y Barbacan. | 1,424 | 4 |
Islas de Dumaran y Agutay
| | Isla y pueblo de Dumaran e Isla y pueblo de Agutay. | 632 | |
Islas de Cuyo
| | Isla y pueblo de Cuyo y su anejo, Canipo, e Isla de Pagaguayan. | 2,430 | 25 |
| TOTAL | | 5,530 | 31 |

Felipe Bravo Census Demographics (Camarines, 1818)
| Province | Pueblo | Native Families | Spanish Filipino Families | Lacandula Families | Negro Filipinos | Chinese Filipinos |
|---|---|---|---|---|---|---|
Partido de Vicol (Ciudad de Nueva-Caceres)
| Camarines | Tabaco y Santa Cruz. | 3,593 | 301 | | 4 | 3 |
| | Naga. | 956 | | | | |
| | Camaligan. | 1,388 | | | | |
| | Canaman. | 1,589 | | | | |
| | Magarao ó Mangarao. | 1,862 | | | | |
| | Bombom ó Bonbon. | 1,245 | | | | |
| | Quipayo. | 784 | | | | |
| | Calabanga. | 1,174 | | | | |
| | Libmanan ó Libnanan. | 1,490 | 1 | | | |
| | Milaor. | 1,902 | 7 | | | |
| | San Fernando. | 688 | 2 | | | |
| | Minalabag. | 901 | | | | |
Partido de la Rinconada
| | Bula. | 471 | | | | |
| | Bao ó Baao. | 1,538 | 37 | | 4 | |
| | Nabua. | 2,612 | 2 | | 2 | |
| | Iriga. | 2,040 | 1 | | | |
| | Buhi ó Buji. | 1,979 | 10 | | | |
| | Bato. | 495 | | | | |
Partido de la Iriga
| | Libon. | 410 | 4 | | | |
| | Polangui. | 2,903 | 15 | | | |
| | Ors ú Oas. | 3,614 | | | | |
| | Ligao. | 2,968 | 24 | | | |
| | Guinobatan. | 2,605 | 1 | | | |
| | Camalig. | 2,330 | 39 | | 9 | |
| | Cagsava. | 2,870 | | | | |
Monte Isaroc
| | Pueblo y Mision de Manguirin. | 160 | | | 629 | |
| | Goa, Tigabon y Tinambag. | 1,123 | | 2 | 625 | |
Partido de la Contra-Costa
| | Sipocot, Lupi y Ragay. | 406 | | | | |
| | Daet. | 1,449 | 26 | | 10 | |
| | Talisay. | 1,055 | 2 | | | |
| | Indan. | 675 | 6 | | | |
| | Paracale. | 697 | 34 | | | |
| | Mambulao. | 950 | | | | |
| | Capalonga. | 137 | | | 4 | |
| TOTAL | | 50,762 | 512 | 2 | 1,287 | 3 |

Felipe Bravo Census Demographics (Capiz, 1818)
| Province | Pueblo | Native Families | Spanish Filipino Families | Lacandula Families | Negro Filipino families | Chinese Filipino families |
|---|---|---|---|---|---|---|
| Capiz | Capiz y su visita Ibisan. | 2,650 | | | | |
| | Panay. | 2,275 | | | | |
| | Panitan. | 1,485 | | | | |
| | Dumalag y sus visitas Dao y Tapas. | 3,158 | | | | |
| | Dumarao. | 2,600 | | | | |
| | Mambusao y sus visitas Sigma y Jamindan. | 1,924 | 13 | | | |
| | Batan y su visita Sapiang. | 2,255 | 56 | | | |
| | Banga y su visita Madalag. | 1,579 | 8 | | | |
| | Malinao. | 1,487 | 11 | | | |
| | Calibo y su visita Macao. | 2,700 | 167 | | | |
| | Ibajay. | 1,268 | 30 | | | |
Isla de Romblon
| | Romblon. | 1,514 | 15 | | | |
Isla de Sibuyan
| | Cauit, Pagalar, y Cajidiocan. | 1,114 | | | | |
Isla de Banton
| | Banton. | | | | | |
Isla de Tablas
| | Guintinguian, Aghagacay, Odiongan, Lanan, y Loog. | | | | | |
Isla de Simara
| | San José, Coloncolon. | | | | | |
Isla del Maestre de Campo
| | Sibali. | | | | | |
| TOTAL | | 26,009 | 285 | | | |

Felipe Bravo Census Demographics (Caraga, 1818)
| Province | Pueblo | Native Families | Spanish Filipino Families | Lacandula Families | Negro Filipino families | Chinese Filipino families |
|---|---|---|---|---|---|---|
Distrito de Surigao y Siargao
| Caraga | Surigao (cabecera), Tagauan, Gigaquit ó Higaguit, Cabubungan, Isla y pueblo de Dinagat, Caco en la isla de Siargao, Dapa en dicha isla, Cabuntug en la misma isla, Sapao en la citada isla. | 2,475 | 25 | | | |
Distrito de Butuan y Talacogon
| | Butuan, Habungan, Tabay, Maynio, Talacogon. | 1,593 | 10 | | | |
Distrito de Cantilan y Mision de San Juan
| | Lutao, Hingoog, Cantilan, Tago, Tandac, Lianga y la Mision de San Juan. | 1,155 | | | | |
Distrito de Bislic y Mision de Caraga
| | Jinatuan, Bislic, Catel, Bagangan y la Mision de Caraga. | 955 | | | | |
| TOTAL | | 6,178 | 35 | | | |

Felipe Bravo Census Demographics (Cavite, 1818)
| Province | Pueblo | Native Families | Spanish Filipino Families | Lacandula Families | Negro Filipino families | Morenos | Chinese Filipino families |
|---|---|---|---|---|---|---|---|
| Cavite | Plaza y puerto de Cavite. | 221 | 153 | | | 5 | 100 |
| | San Roque. | 3,906 | 443 | | | 3 | 35 |
| | Cavite viejo. | 1,855 | 55 | | | | 4 |
| | Bacood ó Bacor. | 1,729 | 19 | | | | 4 |
| | San Francisco de Malabon. | 1,510 | 69 | | | | 3 |
| | Santa Cruz de Malabon. | 2,090 | 3 | | | 1 | 2 |
| | Pueblo y Hacienda de Nait. | 942 | 3 | | | 4 | 2 |
| | Marigondon. | 2,043 | | | | | 3 |
| | Indan. | 2,759 | 36 | | | | 2 |
| | Silang. | 2,255 | 6 | | | 1 | 4 |
| | Imus. | 2,015 | 125 | | | | 5 |
| TOTAL | | 21,325 | 912 | | | 14 | 164 |

Felipe Bravo Census Demographics (Cebu, 1818)
| Province | Pueblo | Native Families | Spanish Filipino Families | Lacandula Families | Negro Filipino families | Chinese Filipino families |
|---|---|---|---|---|---|---|
Isla de Cebu
| Cebu | Cabecera, El Sto. Nombre de Jesus. | 868 | 255 | | | |
| | Parian, Yutaos y Sogod con la visita de este, Simugui. | 1,795 | 109 | | | |
| | San Nicolás y sus visits Talisay, Lipata, Tansan, y Pitao. | 2,420 | | | | |
| | Opon y Talamban. | 2,850 | | | | |
| | Mandave ó Mandaui. | 2,729 | 20 | | | |
| | Danao y Catmon. | 2,656 | 57 | | | |
| | Barili y sus visitas Duman, Jod, Malhual, Coston, Badian y Taiuran. | 1,943 | 14 | | | |
| | Samboan y sus visitas Jiratilan, Malabuyot, y Taburan. | 2,496 | 69 | | | |
| | Bolojon y sus visitas Tayon, Calob, Mambuji y Yunan. | 2,420 | | | | |
| | Dalaguete. | 2,556 | | | | |
| | Argao y Carcar. | 3,250 | | | | |
Isla de Bantayan
| | Bantayan y sus visitas Octon y Davis, Daan, Bantayan y sus visits Sogod y Cavit. | 2,169 | 75 | | | |
Isla de Siquijor
| | Siquijor y su visita Canoan. | 2,450 | 46 | | | |
Isla de Bohol
| | Inabangan y sus visitas Pampan, Corte, Taoran, Canogon, Tubigon, Ipil, Talibon, Tabigui, Inbay, y Cabulao. | 1,815 | 41 | | | |
| | Gindulman y sus visitas Quimale y Cugton. | 1,500 | 6 | | | |
| | Jagna. | 3,255 | | | | |
| | Dimiao. | 2,016 | | | | |
| | Loay. | 1,614 | 5 | | | |
| | Lobog y su anejo S. Isidro. | 3,852 | | | | |
| | Baclayon. | 3,549 | 5 | | | |
| | Tagbilaran. | 2,370 | 2 | | | |
| | Pimin-vitan. | 1,414 | | | | |
| | Malabohoo. | 2,269 | | | | |
| | Loon y su visita Catarbacan. | 1,990 | | | | |
| | Calape y sus visitas Bintig y Mondoog. | 1,932 | | | | |
Isla de Davis
| | Davis. | 2,055 | 9 | | | |
| | Panglao. | 1,350 | | | | |
Isla de Camotes
| | Poro y sus visitas (administración de Mandave). | | | | | |
| TOTAL | | 60,305 | 638 | | | |

Felipe Bravo Census Demographics (Ilocos Norte, 1818)
| Province | Pueblo | Native Families | Spanish Filipino Families | Lacandula Families | Negro Filipino families | Chinese Filipino families |
|---|---|---|---|---|---|---|
| Ilocos Norte | Bangui. | 1,449 | 5 | | | |
| | Nagpartian. | 423 | | | | |
| | Pasuquin. | 1,530 | | | | |
| | Bacarra. | 4,901 | | | | |
| | Vintar. | 2,064 | | | | |
| | Sarrat ó San Miguel de Cuning. | 2,755 | | | | |
| | Pigdig y su visita Santiago. | 4,015 | | | | |
| | Dingras. | 4,559 | | | | |
| | Laoag. | 12,055 | | | | |
| | San Nicolás. | 3,498 | | | | |
| | Batac. | 7,026 | | | | |
| | Paoay. | 7,447 | | | | |
| | Badoc. | 3,356 | | | | |
| TOTAL | | 55,078 | 5 | | | |

Felipe Bravo Census Demographics (Ilocos Sur, 1818)
| Province | Pueblo | Native Families | Spanish Filipino Families | Lacandula Families | Negro Filipino families | Chinese Filipino families |
|---|---|---|---|---|---|---|
| Ilocos Sur | Sinait. | 2,625 | | | | |
| | Cabugao. | 3,595 | | | | |
| | Lapoc. | 1,791 | | | | |
| | Masingal. | 2,740 | | | | |
| | Bantay y su visita San Ildefonso. | 5,535 | | | | |
| | Santo Domingo. | 2,912 | 36 | | | |
| | San Vicente Ferrer. | 2,113 | 10 | | | |
| | Santa Catalina. | 4,292 | | | | |
| | Vigan. | 6,849 | 421 | | | 14 |
| | Santa Catalina V. y M. | 1,750 | | | | |
| | Narvacan. | 4,185 | | | | |
| | Santa Maria. | 2,985 | | | | |
| | San Esteban. | 819 | | | | |
| | Santiago. | 1,023 | | | | |
| | Candong. | 5,709 | | | | |
| | Santa Lucia y su visita Santa Cruz con la mision de Ronda. | 3,690 | | | | |
| | Tagudin y Ous. | 2,620 | | | | |
| | Mision llamada Sevilla. | | | | | |
| | Mision de Argaguinan. | | | | | |
| | Bangas y sus misiones. | 2,582 | | | | |
| | Villa-Cruz y San Rafael. | | | | | |
| | Namacpacan. | 2,564 | | | | |
| | Balaoan. | 2,703 | | | | |
Distrito del Abra
| | Tayum en el Abra. | 1,307 | 4 | | | |
| | Bangued en idem. | 1,836 | 9 | | | |
| TOTAL | | 61,397 | 530 | | | 14 |

Felipe Bravo Census Demographics (Iloilo, 1818)
| Province | Pueblo | Native Families | Spanish Filipino Families | Lacandula Families | Negro Filipino families | Chinese Filipino families |
|---|---|---|---|---|---|---|
| Iloilo | Iloilo (cabecera) y Guimaras. | 1,594 | 103 | | | |
| | Molo. | 3,457 | 23 | | | |
| | Mandurrio. | 5,966 | | | | |
| | Barotac, Asuy y Batag. | 1,200 | | | | |
| | Ooton. | 5,395 | | | | |
| | Tigbauan. | 3,248 | | | | |
| | Guimbal y Tabungan. | 4,209 | | | | |
| | Miagao. | 4,096 | | | | |
| | San Joaquin. | 1,180 | | | | |
| | Igbaras. | 3,329 | | | | |
| | Camando. | 1,974 | | | | |
| | Alimodian y San Miguel. | 4,230 | | | | |
| | Ma-asin. | 2,880 | | | | |
| | Cabatuan. | 6,470 | | | | |
| | Xaro. | 6,871 | | | | |
| | Santa Bárbara. | 3,600 | | | | |
| | Janiuay. | 4,158 | | | | |
| | Lambuso. | 1,040 | | | | |
| | Calinog. | 960 | | | | |
| | Pasi y Abaca. | 2,637 | | | | |
| | Laglag y Diale. | 2,252 | | | | |
| | Pototan. | 3,000 | | | | |
| | Dumangas, Anilao, Banate y Barotac. | 3,200 | | | | |
| TOTALS | | 77,862 | 126 | | | |

Felipe Bravo Census Demographics (Laguna, 1818)
| Province | Pueblo | Native Families | Spanish Filipino Families | Lacandula Families | Negro Filipino families | Morenos | Chinese Filipino families |
|---|---|---|---|---|---|---|---|
| Laguna | Pagsanjan, cabecera. | 4,785 | 7 | | | | |
| | Lumban. | 1,983 | | | | | |
| | Paete. | 1,088 | | | | | |
| | Longos con su anejo San Antonio del Monte. | 944 | | | | | |
| | Paquil. | 628 | | | | | |
| | Panguil. | 1,030 | | | | | |
| | Siniloan. | 1,911 | | | | | |
| | Mavitac. | 525 | | | | | |
| | Santa Maria Caboan. | 257 | | | | | |
| | Cavioli. | 854 | | | | | |
| | Majayjay. | 4,948 | | | | | |
| | Lilio. | 2,168 | | | | | |
| | Nagcarlan. | 2,557 | | | | | |
| | Santa Cruz. | 2,528 | | | | | |
| | Bay. | 668 | | | | | |
| | Pueblo y hacienda de Calauang. | 610 | 2 | | | | |
| | Pila. | 1,117 | 3 | | | | |
| | Los Baños. | 460 | | | | | 5 |
| | Calamba. | 959 | 4 | | | | 15 |
| | Cabuyao. | 1,755 | | | 1 | | 14 |
| | Santa Rosa. | 1,760 | | | | | 9 |
| | Biñan. | 2,598 | 8 | | 2 | 2 | |
| | San Pedro Tunasau. | 1,112 | 2 | | | 1 | |
| | Pililla. | 1,096 | | | | | |
| | Tanay. | 1,352 | | | | | |
| | Binangonan de Bay. | 1,234 | | | | | |
| | Moron. | 1,747 | | | | | |
| | Baras. | 486 | 3 | | | | |
| | Pueblo y hacienda de Angono. | 513 | 2 | | 2 | 3 | |
| TOTAL | | 40,239 | 34 | | 5 | 6 | 41 |

Felipe Bravo Census Demographics (Leyte, 1818)
| Province | Pueblo | Native Families | Spanish Filipino Families | Lacandula Families | Negro Filipino families | Chinese Filipino families |
|---|---|---|---|---|---|---|
| Leyte | Taclovan (cabecera) y Palo. | 2,290 | 11 | | | |
| | Tanauan. | 2,155 | 29 | | | |
| | Dulag y Abuyog. | 2,229 | 14 | | | |
| | Barayuen, Haro y Alang-alang. | 864 | | | | |
| | Barugo y San Miguel. | 626 | | | | |
| | Carigara y su visita Leyte. | 2,253 | | | | |
| | Palompon, Ogmug y Baybay. | 826 | | | | |
| | Hilongos, Bato, Matalom, y Cajanguaan. | 1,231 | 2 | | | |
| | Indan, Dagami, e Isla de Panamao. | 1,978 | | | | |
Islas de Biliran y Maripipi
| | Biliran, Isla de Maripipi, y Maripipi. | 538 | | | | |
Isla de Panahon y Costa Sur
| | Isla de Panahon, Ma-asin, Sogod, Cabalian, y Liloan. | 1,450 | | | | |
| TOTALES | | 16,244 | 56 | | | |

Felipe Bravo Census Demographics (Mariana Islands, 1818)
| Provinces | Pueblos | Native Citizens | Spanish Citizen |
|---|---|---|---|
| Marianas Islands | (Across the Province in General) | 7,555 | 160 |

Felipe Bravo Census Demographics (Mindoro, 1818)
| Province | Pueblo | Number of Native Families | Number of Spanish Filipino Families | Lacandula Families | Negro Filipino families | Morenos | Chinese Filipino families |
|---|---|---|---|---|---|---|---|
| Mindoro | Calapan (cabecera) y sus anejos Baco, Sabuan, Abra de Ilog y Dongon. | 970 | 8 | | | | |
| | Naujan y sus anejos Pola, Pinamalayan, Mamalay, Manaol, Bulalacao, Bongabon, Manjao, Manguirin y la Isla de Ilin. | 924 | 6 | | | | |
Isla de Marinduque
| | Santa Cruz de Napo. | 1,600 | 1 | | | | |
| | Boac. | 1,908 | 31 | | 4 | | |
| | Gazan. | 316 | 1 | | 1 | | |
Isla de Luban
| | Luban. | 1,699 | | | | | |
| TOTAL | | 7,455 | 47 | | 5 | | |

Felipe Bravo Census Demographics (Misamis)
| Province | Pueblo | Number of Native Families | Number of Spanish Filipino Families | Lacandula Families | Negro Filipino families | Morenos | Chinese Filipino families |
|---|---|---|---|---|---|---|---|
Partido de Misamis
| Misamis | Plaza y presidio de Misamis, y su anejo Loculan. | 334 | | | | | |
| | Presidio de Iligan, con su anejo Initao. | 169 | | | | | |
Partido de Dapitan
| | Dapitan, y su visita San Lorenzo de Ilaya. | 666 | 2 | | | | |
| | Lobungan, y sus visitas Dipolog, Piao, Dohinog, y Dicayo. | 701 | | | | | |
Partido de Cagayan
| | Cagayan, y sus visitas Iponau, Mulingan, Agusan, Cagaloan, Lasaan, Balingasay, Salay, Quinoquitan ó Bacay, Mubijut, y la Mision de Pinangudan. | 3,177 | 1 | | | | |
Isla de Camiguin (Partido de Catarman)
| | Catarman, y sus visitas Mambujao, Guinsiliban, y Sagay. | 1,693 | 35 | | | | |
| TOTAL | | 6,740 | 38 | | | | |

Felipe Bravo Census Demographics (Samar, 1818)
| Provinces | Pueblos | Native Families | Spanish Filipino Families | Negrito Families | Chinese Filipino Families |
|---|---|---|---|---|---|
| Samar | Samar island, in general. | 16,671 | 174 | | |

Felipe Bravo Census Demographics (Zamboanga, 1818)
| Provinces | Pueblos | Native Citizens | Spanish Filipino Soldiers | Kapampangan Soldiers | Spanish and Mexican Citizens |
|---|---|---|---|---|---|
| Zamboanga | Zamboanga-province and peninsula . | 8,640 | 300 | 100 | A very large but unknown amount of the civilian population, they are mostly employed in the navy and shipping. |

==== Chinese Filipinos ====
Meanwhile, government records show that 1.35 Million pure-bred Chinese live in the Philippines and 20% of the Philippines' total population were either half Chinese or mixed Chinese-Filipinos.

According to a research report by historian Austin Craig who was commissioned by the United States in 1915 to ascertain the total number of the various races of the Philippines, the pure Chinese, referred to as Sangley, number around 20,000 (as of 1918), and that around one-third of the population of Luzon have partial Chinese ancestry. This comes with a footnote about the widespread concealing and de-emphasising of the exact number of Chinese in the Philippines.

Another source dating from the Spanish Colonial Period shows the growth of the Chinese and the Chinese mestizo population to nearly 10% of the Philippine population by 1894.

| Race | Population (1810) | Population (1850) | Population (1894) |
|---|---|---|---|
| Malay (i.e., indigenous Filipino) | 2,395,677 | 4,725,000 | 6,768,000 |
| mestizo de sangley (i.e., Chinese mestizo) | 120,621 | 240,000 | 500,000 |
| mestizo de español (i.e., Spanish mestizo) | 7,000 (tributes) x 5 (Minimum family-size) = 35,000 | 70,000 | 140,000 |
| sangley (i.e., Unmixed Chinese) | 7,000 | 25,000 | 100,000 |
| Peninsular (i.e., Spaniard) | 4,000 | 10,000 | 35,000 |
| Total | 2,619,705 | 5,184,814 | 7,772,628 |

In the 1860s to 1890s, in the urban areas of the Philippines, especially at Manila, according to burial statistics, as much as 3.3% of the population were pure European Spaniards and the pure Chinese were as high as 9.9%. The Spanish-Filipino and Chinese-Filipino mestizo populations may have fluctuated. Eventually, everybody belonging to these non-native categories diminished because they were assimilated into and chose to self-identify as pure Filipinos. Since during the Philippine Revolution, the term "Filipino" included anybody born in the Philippines coming from any race. That would explain the abrupt drop of otherwise high Chinese, Spanish and mestizo percentages across the country by the time of the first American census in 1903.

==== American Filipinos ====
The Philippines, after the Philippine-American War was briefly an American colony. During colonial rule, an estimated 800,000 Americans were born in the Philippines The Japanese occupation of the Philippines during World War 2, exterminated a large portion of the American and European population of the Philippines. By 2013, some 220,000 to 600,000 American citizens were living in the country. In the same time period, there were 250,000 Amerasians scattered across the cities of Angeles City, Manila, and Olongapo, forming aboout 0.25% of the Philippine population.

By 2025, the number of Americans living in the Philippines increased to at least 750,000, forming 0.75% of the Philippine population. When summing up the percentage of individuals of pure American descent (0.75% of the population) and partial American ancestry (Amerasians) (which form 0.25% of the population) about 1% of the total Philippine demographics has full and partial American descent.

== See also ==
- Demographics of the Philippines
- Peopling of Southeast Asia
- Genetic history of East Asians
