= Flat Earth Society (disambiguation) =

The International Flat Earth Research Society, also known as the Flat Earth Society, is a global organisation of people who advocate the belief that the Earth is flat.

Flat Earth Society may also refer to:

- Flat Earth Society (band), a Belgian band
- "Flat Earth Society", a song by Bad Religion from the album Against the Grain
