= Hack Attack =

Book by Nick Davies

Hack Attack: How the Truth Caught Up with Rupert Murdoch
- The cover of the UK first edition
- Author: Nick Davies
- Language: English
- Genre: Non-fiction, Investigative journalism
- Published: 2014 by Chatto and Windus (UK), House of Anansi Press (Canada) and Farrar, Straus and Giroux (U.S.)
- Publication place: United Kingdom
- Pages: 412 pp (first edition)
- ISBN: 978-0-701-18730-9

Hack Attack: How the Truth Caught Up with Rupert Murdoch is a 2014 book about the News International phone hacking scandal by the British investigative journalist Nick Davies.

Hack Attack was published by Random House's imprint Chatto and Windus in the United Kingdom, by House of Anansi Press (Canada) and by Farrar, Straus and Giroux's imprint Faber and Faber Inc, in the USA.

== Background ==
Hack Attack is Davies's first book since his 2008 work on the British press, Flat Earth News. Davies began work on Hack Attack in July 2011 at the same time that parliamentarian Tom Watson began work on his work on the phone hacking scandal, Dial M for Murdoch. Davies and Watson subsequently met and discussed their respective projects.

== Structure ==
The book contains sixteen chapters divided into three sections; 'Crime and Concealment', 'The Power Game' and 'Truth'. The book is prefaced by a 'Who's Who' of people mentioned in the book and an author's note. An epilogue ends the book, followed by an appendix that lists 41 private investigators who were used by British newspapers; many of whom have been convicted of various crimes. An extensive bibliography with links to the media and sources used in the book and exhibits are at the book's webpages.

== Reception ==
Henry Porter positively reviewed Hack Attack in The Guardian, calling it a "gripping account". Porter wrote that "This book is important, not simply because it is written by a superb reporter who took on a seemingly invulnerable criminal conspiracy, or because it is, even after Leveson and the months of evidence in court, the best account we have of the phone-hacking scandal and the attendant police corruption and cover-ups. It is, as well, the story of modern Britain and how its standards and politics have been degraded by one man's ruthless acquisition of power... Davies has laid it all bare in an exciting, clear and honest narrative..." Porter concluded by describing the book as deserving "a lot of praise and success. It is a masterly summary of the hacking affair, as well as the ingenuity and persistence that lead to great journalism." Porter reserved his sole criticism for the book's subtitle, as he felt that the truth "hasn't yet" caught up with Rupert Murdoch; the subsequent reorganization of News Corporation in the wake of the scandal left the company and the Murdoch family substantially enriched. Peter Wilby also positively reviewed Hack Attack in The Guardian.

John Lloyd gave a largely positive review in the Financial Times, writing that "What is revealed here, in painful, careful detail, is a journalism that held power in contempt – and, together with power, held in contempt people both famed and obscure, dominant and meek," and that Davies in "his exhumation of this trove of journalistic ordure, done a colossal service to Britain's democracy." Lloyd ends his review by describing Hack Attack as "the book of a very bold reporter about a passage of arms that he won, to our great benefit."

David Carr in the New York Times wrote that Davies was "...just the kind of person you don't want to have on your tail...He wages a ground war to get at the truth, which comes less in one single “aha” moment than as a slow drip of facts penetrating a tissue of lies. Evidence is destroyed just before he gets his hands on it, the police redact documents so as to denude them of value. Then, just in the nick of time, a confidential source or secret document arrives. In that sense, the book moves right along, from cliffhanger to cliffhanger." Carr wrote that "There is so much excess and human pathology on display here, it makes Bonfire of the Vanities seem restrained." Carr also criticized the book's subtitle, writing that "...the truth never catches up with Murdoch. True enough, he loves newspapering and has been known to become deeply involved in editorial matters, but no real case is made that he knew the specifics of how his papers were coming up with very private facts about public figures." Carr concludes by opining that "It is, in the best way, an old story. A lone gunslinger takes on a dishonest town, and in the end the bad guys flee. It is both more complicated and a bit less satisfying in reality, but that would be another book, and probably a less enjoyable one."

In The Daily Telegraph Peter Oborne described Davies as "Britain's greatest investigative journalist" in his five star review of the book, adding that it was "as exciting as a thriller but far more important because it provides such a horrifying portrait of the media/political class that has governed Britain in recent years...This book should be compulsory reading in journalism schools and must be read by anyone who wishes to understand how British politics actually works."

A more critical review came from Will Gore in The Independent who wrote that Davies "knows how to weave a compelling tale", and that his "account of how Murdoch and his dysfunctional lieutenants ensnared, enslaved, and frightened generations of politicians is blistering. His unpicking of Scotland Yard's early failure properly to investigate phone-hacking is terrific – and depressing." Gore concluded by with the belief that while Hack Attack is a "great read" its outlook "sometimes feels a little too black and white: you are either with us or against us."

Two reviewers critiqued Davies's epilogue to Hack Attack that was critical of neo-liberalism. Gore wrote that "Davies may be on the side of the just. But he is as ideologically driven as those he despises. In the end, his real target is neo-liberalism, which 'has reversed hundreds of years of struggle' and undermined the protection offered by democratic governments to ordinary working people." Lloyd wrote that Davies made a mistake by ending the book "with a rant on neoliberalism. It's a subject too important for an epilogue of a few pages; it hasn't featured much in the preceding narrative; and it's hard to agree that it is triumphing in a country, the UK, with a mixed and quite regulated economy whose most popular institutions are the thoroughly socialised NHS and the publicly owned BBC – which, to be sure, the Murdoch papers paint as monsters."

Positive reviews of Hack Attack were also written by Martin Hickman in The Independent, Erik Wemple in the Washington Post, Dan Kennedy in The Boston Globe, Kirkus Reviews, and Ryan Chittum in the Columbia Journalism Review.

=== Awards and honours ===
Hack Attack was longlisted for the Samuel Johnson Prize for Non-Fiction and shortlisted for the Financial Times and McKinsey Business Book of the Year Award. Esquire magazine named Hack Attack as one of their "5 of the Best Books About Journalism".

== Film adaptation ==
It was announced in September 2014 that the American actor and producer George Clooney will direct a film adaption of Hack Attack, and co-produce the film with Grant Heslov, through their company Smoke House Pictures for Sony Pictures Entertainment. Clooney described Hack Attack as having "all the elements - lying, corruption, blackmail...The fact that it's true is the best part." At the 2019 Byline Festival, Davies said that Clooney was unable to raise $25 to $30 million to make the film as no one "wanted to invest in a project which would alienate Rupert Murdoch." It was then adapted in 2025 by Jack Thorne into a seven part TV drama for ITV called The Hack, starring David Tennant, Robert Carlyle, Eve Myles, & Toby Jones.

== Bibliography ==
- Davies, Nick (2014). Hack Attack: How the Truth Caught Up with Rupert Murdoch (first ed.). London: Chatto & Windus. ISBN 978-0-701187-309.
