= This Flat Earth =

2018 play by Lindsey Ferrentino

- Original language: English
- Written by: Lindsey Ferrentino
- Characters: Julie; Dan; Zander; Lisa; Cloris
- Genre: Drama
- Setting: New England

Premiere
- Date: March 2018
- Place: Playwrights Horizons

This Flat Earth is a 2018 play by Lindsey Ferrentino. The play officially opened Off-Broadway at Playwrights Horizons in March of 2018. In The New York Times, Ben Brantley described it as, "Lindsey Ferrentino's most daring play to date, with profound and essential subjects. There is no denying the urgency of this work." It received the Edgerton Foundation New Play Award.

== Plot ==
This Flat Earth is a contemporary play about Julie and Zander, two twelve year olds who try to make sense of the world when the unthinkable - a school shooting - occurs at their middle school.
