= Flat Earth News (book) =

Non-fiction book by Nick Davies

Flat Earth News: An Award-winning Reporter Exposes Falsehood, Distortion and Propaganda in the Global Media
- Author: Nick Davies
- Genre: Non-fiction, journalism, politics
- Published: 2008
- Publisher: Chatto & Windus
- Publication place: United Kingdom
- Pages: 408
- ISBN: 978-0-7011-8145-1 0701181451; 9780099512684; 0099512688
- OCLC: 176826415
- Preceded by: Dark Heart (1998); The School Report (2000)
- Followed by: Hack Attack: How the Truth Caught Up with Rupert Murdoch (2014)

Flat Earth News: An Award-winning Reporter Exposes Falsehood, Distortion and Propaganda in the Global Media is a 2008 non-fiction book by Nick Davies in which he investigated malpractice in British journalism. The Flat Earth News is considered to be the sister book to Davies' 2014 publication, Hack Attack: How the Truth Caught Up with Rupert Murdoch.

== Background ==
In Flat Earth News, Davies, who has been a journalist since the 1970s, undertook an analysis of daily news media in the United Kingdom from the 1980s to 2008. From funding raised through the Rowntree Foundation, Davies commissioned a Cardiff School of Journalism, Media and Cultural Studies research project led by Justin Lewis on the United Kingdom's national news coverage The researchers examined the origins of 2,000 stories that had been carried by The Times, The Daily Telegraph, The Guardian, and The Independent, and in some cases−The Daily Mail. The report found that only 12% of the stories were provably based on material that the reporters had fact-checked and investigated themselves. Based on the data, the research showed that "everyday practices of news judgement, fact-checking, balance, criticising and interrogating sources et cetera, that are, in theory, central to routine, day-to-day journalism" were the exception, not the rule. Davies thesis is that journalists themselves are not the reason for the increase in "falsehood, distortion and propaganda"—the problem is structural. Corporations, that operate under a logic of commercialism, have taken over newsrooms. Citing Rupert Murdoch—the founder and CEO of News Corp, as an example, Davies says that under the corporate model, there are fewer journalists working at newspapers and they have increased workloads.

== Reviews ==
A 6 March 2008 London Review of Books said that Flat Earth News was "a genuinely important book, one which is likely to change, permanently, the way anyone who reads it looks at the British newspaper industry".

Mary Riddell in The Observer said that "Much of Davies's analysis is fair, meticulously researched and fascinating, if gloomy".

Peter Oborne in The Spectator said that Nick Davies has amassed an overwhelming weight of evidence that the British media lies, distorts facts and routinely breaks the law.

The Independent called it a "wide-ranging investigation of the shortcomings of the global and British media."

The Press Gazette cited a number of reviews—including those that were quite critical of the book.

The British journalist, who was criticized in Davies book—Kamal Ahmed−published a response in the Observer on 11 February 2008. Davies said that Ahmed had worked with Alastair Campbell, Tony Blair's "spin doctor" and had become a "mouthpiece" for the Blair government, which included the Observer "backing" the Iraq war, which Ahmed denied.

== Press Gazette series ==
In 2008, Press Gazette serialised Flat Earth News "when every national newspaper – including The Guardian – declined to do so". Many news media outlets were critical of Davies in 2008. The Press Gazette series included references to details such as the copy of a fax that a Sunday Telegraph reporter had given Davies regarding the weapons expert, David Kelly. On the day Kelly's body was found, a private investigator had sent the Telegraph a list of every phone number Kelly had dialled in the eight weeks leading up to his death.

== Hack Attack ==
In 2014, Davies published Hack Attack: The Inside Story of How the Truth Caught Up with Rupert Murdoch, which has been called the sister book to Flat Earth News.
