= Justin Lewis (media scholar) =

British media scholar

Justin Lewis FBA FLSW is a Professor of Communication and Creative Industries at the Cardiff School of Journalism, Media and Cultural Studies at Cardiff University. He is the Director of Clwstwr, an Arts and Humanities Research Council and Welsh Government funded Research & Development innovation centre for the Screen and News sectors and Media Cymru, a £50 million, 23 partner consortium, funded by UK Research and Innovation, Cardiff Capital Region and Welsh Government, designed to boost inclusive and sustainable media sector innovation in Wales. He is also Chief Field Editor for Frontiers in Communication, a global Open Access publisher.

He was formerly the Head of School and Dean of Research for the School of Journalism, Media and Culture at Cardiff University. In 2012, while in this role, he established the Centre for Community Journalism. In 2013, he was elected a Fellow of the Learned Society of Wales and in 2024 a Fellow of the British Academy.

== Publications ==
- Art - Who Needs It?, co-authored with David Morley and Russell Southwood. London: Comedia, 1986.
- Art, Culture and Enterprise: the Politics of the Cultural Industries, London: Routledge, 1990.
- The Ideological Octopus: An Exploration of Television and its Audience, New York: Routledge, 1991.
- Enlightened Racism: The Cosby Show, Audiences and the Myth of the American Dream, co-authored with Sut Jhally. Boulder: Westview Press, 1992.
- Viewing, Reading, Listening: Essays in Cultural Reception, co- edited with Jon Cruz. Boulder: Boulder: Westview Press, 1994.
- Constructing Public Opinion: how political elites do what they like and why we seem to go along with it, New York: Columbia University Press, 2001.
- Television Studies: The Key Concepts, co-authored with Bernadette Casey, Neil Casey, Ben Calvert and Liam French, London: Routledge, 2001.
- Cultural Policy: A Critical Reader, co-written and edited with Toby Miller, Malden, MA: Blackwell, 2002.
- Citizens or Consumers: The Media and the Decline of Political Participation, co-authored with Sanna Inthorn and Karin Wahl-Jorgensen, Open University Press, 2005.
- Shoot First and Ask Questions Later: Media Coverage of the War in Iraq, co-authored with Rod Brookes, Nick Mosdell and Terry Threadgold, Peter Lang, 2006.
- Television Studies: The Key Concepts, co-authored with Bernadette Casey, Neil Casey, Ben Calvert and Liam French, London: Routledge, 2001, 2nd edition, 2008.
- Beyond Consumer Capitalism: Media and the Limits to Imagination, Cambridge, UK: Polity Press, 2013
