= Mosley v United Kingdom =

2011 decision in the European Court of Human Rights

Mosley v United Kingdom [2011] 53 E.H.R.R. 30 was a 2011 decision in the European Court of Human Rights regarding the right to privacy under Article 8 of the European Convention on Human Rights. An application to the court was made by Max Mosley, the former president of the FIA, after his successful breach of confidence legal case against the News of the World (known as Mosley v News Group Newspapers [2008] EWHC 1777 (QB)). In that case, the court unanimously rejected the proposition that Article 8 required member states of the Council of Europe to legislate to prevent newspapers printing stories regarding individual private lives without first warning the individuals concerned. It instead held that it fell within each state's margin of appreciation to determine whether to legislate on that matter.

== Application ==
On 29 September 2008, Mosley filed an application to the court by claiming Articles 8 and 13 of the European Convention on Human Rights had been breached by the United Kingdom failing to impose a legal duty on the News of the World to notify him in advance of publication of the story. That would allow him the opportunity to seek an interim injunction and thus to prevent publication. If the court decided that there was admissibility in the application, Mosley argued that the damages awarded to him by the High Court were an insufficient remedy.

Mosley challenged the state of English privacy law by arguing for a doctrine of prior disclosure, which would require journalists to give at least two days' notice of intention to print stories about the misbehavior of a public figure so that a judge, rather than just an editor, could decide whether the story should be published. John Kampfner, the chief executive of the human rights group Index on Censorship, and author of Freedom for Sale, argued that a doctrine of prior disclosure would stifle investigative journalism and damage press freedom.

The case was fast-tracked through the European Court of Human Rights and, in addition to the United Kingdom government's case, a brief in opposition was prepared by the human rights lawyers Geoffrey Robertson QC and Mark Stephens at the instance of a number of media organisations including Media Legal Defence Initiative, Index on Censorship, European Publishers Council, the Media international Lawyers Association, Romanian Helsinki Committee, Global Witness, Media Law Resource Centre and The Bulgarian Access to Information Committee. On 11 January 2011, a hearing was held by a Chamber of the Court. Lord Pannick QC and David Sherborne appeared for Max Mosley, James Eadie QC and A. Jeeves for the United Kingdom.

== Decision ==
In its decision, given on 10 May 2011, the court stated that "it is clear that no sum of money award after disclosure of the impugned material could afford a remedy in respect of the specific complaint advanced by the applicant". It dismissed the United Kingdom government's contention that the applicant had not exhausted domestic remedies. It added that "the present case resulted in a flagrant and unjustified invasion of the applicant’s private life" and reiterated that "there is a distinction to be drawn between reporting facts – even if controversial – capable of contributing to a debate of general public interest in a democratic society, and making tawdry allegations about an individual's private life". It said the "conduct of the newspaper in the applicant's case is open to severe criticism" and took "note of the recommendation of the Select Committee that the Editors' Code be amended to include a requirement that journalists should normally notify the subject of their articles prior to publication, subject to a 'public interest' exception."

However, judges found in favour of the United Kingdom and ruled that domestic law was not in conflict with the convention. The court ruled that although there was a clear obligation to ensure that personal privacy was protected, there were existing protections in place, including the options of referral to the Press Complaints Commission and the possibility of seeking civil damages. The court ruled that the damages awarded under the earlier case at the English High Court represented an adequate remedy in respect of the breach of Mosley's rights.

The case was widely followed and reported in the mainstream media, with The Daily Telegraph describing the case as "a significant victory for free speech". Several papers compared the case with the wave of privacy injunctions in the United Kingdom at the time, the so-called superinjunctions, but although both involve privacy law, they are not related legally. Others commentators criticised tabloid coverage of the case. For instance, Richard Peppiatt in The Guardian accused the tabloid press of "quote-picking" and downplaying elements of the judgment, including the court's reaffirmation of Mosley's 'victim status' and its admonition of the conduct of the News of the World in relation to Mosley.
