= David Eady =

British High Court judge (born 1943)

The Honourable Sir David Eady

Justice of the High Court
- In office 24 April 1997 – 24 March 2013

Personal details
- Born: 24 March 1943 (age 83)
- Education: Trinity College, Cambridge
- Occupation: Judge

Sir David Eady (born 24 March 1943) is a retired High Court judge in England and Wales. As a judge, he is known for having presided over many high-profile libel and privacy cases.

He was called to the bar in 1966 and became a Queen's Counsel in 1983. He was a member of One Brick Court chambers and, as a lawyer, specialised in media law until he was appointed a High Court Judge (Queen's Bench division) on 21 April 1997. As of November 2014, he continued to sit in the High Court as an additional judge.

== Background ==
Eady was educated at the Brentwood School, Essex, and graduated from Trinity College, Cambridge.

== Barrister ==
Eady was a member of One Brick Court Chambers. He specialised in media law. The Daily Telegraph described him as "a leading courtroom defender of red-top journalism, much in demand as a barrister who could be relied on to uphold the freedom of the tabloids to expose the private lives of public figures."

Examples include Eady's defence of The Sun when the Coronation Street actor Bill Roache sued over taunts that he was "boring". He also represented Singapore politician Lee Kuan Yew in his libel suits against the late opposition politician Joshua Benjamin Jeyaretnam.

Eady was unsuccessful in 1984 when he represented Derek Jameson in an action against the BBC over a critical profile of Jameson on Radio 4's Week Ending programme broadcast on 22 March 1980. Eady had advised his instructing solicitor Peter Carter-Ruck that the case was "high risk", but the advice had not been passed on to Jameson. In the late 1980s, Eady was appointed to the Calcutt Committee, presided over by David Calcutt, which considered how to police the media.

== Judicial career ==
As a judge, Eady was known for having judged many high-profile libel cases. According to The Times, Eady "has delivered a series of rulings that have bolstered privacy laws and encouraged libel tourism". One commentator said Eady "has interpreted the European Convention on Human Rights in a restrictive way. In effect he is developing a privacy law." He has been repeatedly criticised by Private Eye on similar grounds. The Daily Telegraph described him as "something of an enigma to his colleagues. He has a reputation for being distant and sometimes difficult in court, but can be immensely charming off duty."

In April 2008, The Times commented, "He may be just one of more than 100 High Court judges but Sir David Eady is nonetheless arguably more influential than any of his colleagues. Almost single-handedly he is creating new privacy law."

=== Position on privacy ===
Eady cited the failure of actor Gorden Kaye in Kaye v Robertson to obtain legal remedies for alleged invasion of privacy as one of his concerns, saying that there was "a serious gap in the jurisprudence of any civilised society, if such a gross intrusion could happen without redress".

In June 2011, in an interview with legal journalist Joshua Rozenberg, Eady explained that courts assessing issues related to privacy must apply the test used in Von Hannover v Germany (2004), where the decisive factor is whether publication contributes to "a debate of general interest to society".

=== Notable cases ===
In 2003, Eady presided over Alexander Vassiliev vs Frank Cass and Amazon.com.

In December 2004, Eady ruled in favour of politician George Galloway after The Daily Telegraph newspaper had reported that documents had been found by journalist David Blair in Baghdad that appeared to show that Galloway had received money from Saddam Hussein's regime. In its defence, the newspaper did not attempt to claim justification in that it was seeking to prove the truth of the defamatory reports. Instead, the paper sought to argue the public interest defence established in Reynolds v Times Newspapers Ltd. However, Eady did not accept this defence, saying the suggestion that Galloway was guilty of "treason", "in Saddam's pay" and of being "Saddam's little helper" caused him to conclude "the newspaper was not neutral but both embraced the allegations with relish and fervour and went on to embellish them". Eady also ruled that Galloway had not been given a fair or reasonable opportunity to make inquiries or meaningful comment upon the documents before they were published.

In 2005, Eady prevented author Niema Ash from revealing certain details about singer Loreena McKennitt on the grounds that they would violate her right to privacy as enshrined in the European Convention on Human Rights. Furthermore, Ash, as McKennitt's friend, owed the singer a duty of confidence.

In December 2006, Eady granted an order to "[a] prominent figure in the sports world who had had an affair with another man's wife", preventing the betrayed husband from naming him in the media.

In the 2006 case of Jameel v Wall Street Journal Europe, Eady ruled in favor of the plaintiff, a Saudi Arabian banker. The Wall Street Journal had listed Jameel among several Saudi businessmen who were allegedly being monitored for support of terrorism. In 2009, the Law Lords overturned Eady's ruling, with Lord Hoffmann accusing Eady of being "hostile to the spirit of Reynolds", a reference to the public interest defence established in Reynolds v Times Newspapers Ltd.

In Khalid bin Mahfouz's so-called "libel tourism" case against U.S. scholar Rachel Ehrenfeld, whose book Funding Evil documented allegations of Mahfouz's financial support of terrorism, Eady entered a default judgment in favour of Mahfouz. On 1 May 2008, in reaction to the case, the New York State Legislature passed a law described as "[offering] New Yorkers greater protection against libel judgments in countries whose laws are inconsistent with the freedom of speech granted by the United States Constitution."

In 2008, Eady presided over Max Mosley v News Group Newspapers Limited, awarding Max Mosley damages of £60,000 for invasion of privacy after the News of the World exposed his participation in a sado-masochistic orgy. In 2009, Eady issued a judgment that Google was not liable for defamatory content accessible through or cached by Google Search.

In June 2009, Eady ruled that Richard Horton, a detective constable who wrote an anonymous blog called "NightJack", could be named, as he had "no reasonable expectation of privacy". The blog was described as a "behind-the-scenes commentary on policing".

That same year, Eady ruled in a libel case brought by the British Chiropractic Association (BCA) against science writer Simon Singh. Singh had said that the BCA "happily promotes bogus treatments". Eady ruled this meant its claims were "deliberately false" and dishonest, not merely false or unsupported. Singh filed an appeal, which he won in April 2010. The court of appeal ruled that Eady had "erred in his approach" and was inviting the court "to become an Orwellian ministry of truth".

Also in 2009, Eady presided in a libel case media proprietor Richard Desmond brought and lost against investigative author Tom Bower, over a passing reference in Bower's 2006 book about Conrad Black. The case was notable for two crucial mid-trial appeals which Bower brought and won against Eady's rulings over the admissibility of certain evidence Bower wished to present.

Eady also gave judgment in a number of high-profile media trials, involving, among others, the singer Madonna; actor Josh Hartnett; chef Marco Pierre White; former secretary and mistress Sara Keays; journalists Roger Alton and Carol Sarler; and actress Sienna Miller.

In April and May 2011, Eady was the judge in CTB v News Group Newspapers. The case involved an anonymous Premier League footballer ("CTB") who had been involved in an alleged extra-marital relationship with model Imogen Thomas. Tweets and media coverage in the Scottish press named the footballer as Ryan Giggs. On 23 May 2011, Eady upheld the injunction in the High Court. Later the same day, MP John Hemming used parliamentary privilege to name Giggs in the House of Commons, effectively ending the injunction. On 15 December 2011, Eady accepted that Thomas had not attempted to blackmail the footballer known as "CTB" and suggested there was "no longer any point in maintaining the anonymity", however, the injunction preventing the naming of "CTB" nonetheless remained in place.

=== Criticism ===
Daily Mail editor Paul Dacre has been particularly critical of Eady. In a November 2008 article he accused the judge of "arrogant and amoral judgments", and went on to complain that

[W]hile London boasts scores of eminent judges, one man is given a virtual monopoly of all cases against the media, enabling him to bring in a privacy law by the back door. The freedom of the press is far too important to be left to the somewhat desiccated values of a single judge who clearly has an animus against the popular press and the right of people to freedom of expression

Dacre was particularly critical of Eady's ruling in the Max Mosley case, describing it as a frightening example of what "one judge with a subjective and highly relativist moral sense can do ... with a stroke of his pen". The Daily Mail accused Eady of "moral and social nihilism" and "arrogance". According to unnamed friends of Eady cited in The Guardian, Eady was "profoundly hurt" by these attacks.

Eady was repeatedly rebuked by the Court of Appeal for his conduct during the 2009 libel case involving Richard Desmond and Tom Bower. Eady disallowed several pieces of evidence against Desmond which the Appeal Court ruled were clearly relevant to the case. The Court of Appeal judges ruled that Eady's decision was "plainly wrong" and "might lead to a miscarriage of justice". After hearing the evidence, the jury found in favour of Bower.

In December 2009, Eady commented in The Guardian on some of this criticism, saying that "The media have nowhere to vent their frustrations other than through personal abuse of the particular judge who happens to have made the decision". He added that he does not see libel tourism as a problem: "I believe the suggestion is that there is a large queue of people, loosely classified as 'foreigners', waiting to clog up our courts with libel actions that are without merit and which have nothing to do with our jurisdiction ... [This] is not a phenomenon we actually come across in our daily lives."

On 10 December 2009, Eady granted Tiger Woods an injunction preventing the UK media from publishing further revelations about his private life. Reacting to this, media lawyer Mark Stephens said "This injunction would never have been granted in America. ... It's unbelievable that Tiger Woods' lawyers have been able to injunct the UK press from reporting information here." Foreign media, including The Irish Times, ignored the terms of the UK injunction and published its details.

In April 2011, Eady faced press criticism following a case in which he granted a restraining order contra mundum ("against the world") in OPQ v BJM, creating a worldwide and permanent ban on publication of details about an individual's private life. At a previous hearing on 2 February 2011, Eady had described the matter as "a straightforward and blatant blackmail case".

== See also ==
- 2011 British privacy injunctions controversy
