= Mosley v News Group Newspapers Ltd =

UK legal case

Mosley v News Group Newspapers
- Court: High Court
- Full case name: Max Mosley v News Group Newspapers Limited
- Decided: 24 July 2008
- Citations: [2008] EWHC 1777 (QB), (2008) Times, 30 July
- Transcript: Max Mosley v News Group Newspapers Limited

Case history
- Prior action: None

Court membership
- Judge sitting: David Eady

Mosley v News Group Newspapers [2008] EWHC 1777 (QB) was an English High Court case in which the former President of the Fédération Internationale de l'Automobile, Max Mosley, challenged the News of the World. The newspaper had exposed his involvement in what it called a sadomasochistic sex act involving several female prostitutes when they published a video of the incident recorded by one of the women and published details of the incident in their newspaper, wrongly describing it as "Nazi-themed". The case resulted in Mosley being awarded £60,000 (approx. US$92,000) in damages.

== Background ==
The claimant, Max Mosley, had been President of the Fédération Internationale de l'Automobile since 1993 as well as being a trustee of its charitable arm the FIA Foundation. He brought legal action against News Group Newspapers Ltd, the publishers of the News of the World newspaper, complaining about an article by journalist Neville Thurlbeck published on 30 March 2008. The headline of the article was "F1 Boss has Sick Nazi Orgy with Five Hookers". This was accompanied by the sub-heading "Son of Hitler-loving fascist in sex shame". Mosley was the son of Oswald Mosley, who was the leader of the 1930s British Union of Fascists. Mosley relied upon an action based upon breach of confidence or the unauthorised disclosure of personal information rather than defamation. Mosley claimed that sexual or sadomasochistic activities were inherently private in nature and that their portrayal was an invasion of privacy by reason of a pre-existing relationship of confidentiality between the participants.

== Judgment ==
Mosley's case relied in part on the ruling in the case McKennitt v Ash where there was "breach of confidence by way of conduct inconsistent with a pre-existing relationship, rather than simply of the purloining of private information". However, Justice David Eady also stated "The law now affords protection to information in respect of which there is a reasonable expectation of privacy, even in circumstances where there is no preexisting relationship giving rise of itself to an enforceable duty of confidence". He stated that the passing of the Human Rights Act 1998 required this conclusion and that therefore the relevant values in this case were expressed in Articles 8 and 10 of the European Convention on Human Rights, as Campbell v MGN Ltd established these values are as much applicable to disputes between two private individuals as where one is a public body. Justice Eady held that the first hurdle was the need to show a reasonable expectation of privacy, and if this could be overcome it was a matter of weighing up the competing Convention rights.

=== Nazi allegation ===
The principal factual dispute between the parties was whether there was any "Nazi" or "death camp" element to the incident. The claimant denied that, as did four of the prostitutes. On the fourth day of the trial, it was revealed that News Group Newspapers Limited would place no further reliance on "Woman E", the prostitute who had recorded the incident and eventually received £20,000 (about $31,000) for doing so. The lawyers representing Mosley contended that the video represented a "'standard' S-and-M prison scenario".

When Mosley issued a denial after the first article was published, the News of the World published a further article the following Sunday including a ten-point rebuttal that insisted that there was a Nazi element to the scenario. The rebuttal argued, among other things, that the scenario included an imitation modern German Luftwaffe jacket, striped prison uniforms, and medical examinations and that Mosley spoke in German or with a fake German accent. The News of the World also took an exclamation by one of the women "Brunettes rule!" as a reference to Nazi racial policies.

Justice Eady suggested that equating everything German with Nazism was offensive. He concluded that there was nothing specific to the Nazi period about the medical examination or the fact that the claimant had his head shaved. Eady also concluded that the use of an English nom de guerre weakened the suggestion that there was a Nazi element to the incident. Eady suggested that the prison uniforms did nothing to identify the Nazi era.

=== Missing e-mails ===
The News of the World placed weight on the fact that one of the prostitutes (Woman "A") deleted e-mails prior to the trial.

=== Allegation of criminality ===
Justice Eady rejected the argument that Mosley could be said to have committed a crime under the Offences against the Person Act 1861 on himself.

== Case ==
Mosley challenged the publication of details of his private life under Article 8 of the European Convention on Human Rights in respect to the headline, which read "F1 boss has sick Nazi orgy with five hookers". The defendant argued that the newspaper's right to freedom of expression should prevail because of the public interest in knowing the individual was involved in Nazi roleplay and that irrespective of the Nazi element, the public had a right to know since the individual was FIA President.

However the court ruled that "there was no evidence that the gathering of 28 March 2008 was intended to be an enactment of Nazi behaviour or adoption of any of its attitudes. Nor was it in fact".

The court ruled that even in cases of adultery, sadomasochistic behaviour was generally not a matter of public interest, but there could be a public interest if the behaviour involved the mocking of Jews or the Holocaust. However, there was "no genuine basis at all for the suggestion that the participants mocked the victims of the Holocaust". Mosley was awarded damages of £60,000 (about $92,000) from the case, and the court ruled that there was no evidence of a Nazi element to the sex act.

== Criticism ==
The case has been criticised due to concerns that it may have a chilling effect on investigative journalism. Media lawyer Mark Stephens expressed such sentiments after the judgment and noted the hefty price that newspapers would pay for getting a "public interest" decision wrong. Newspapers criticised the judgment, The Sun describing it as "a dark day for British freedom" and a step towards "a dangerous European-style privacy law". However, lawyer Dan Trench argues that the level of damages awarded in privacy cases will not deter publication, and the judgment has been met with approval by some commentators and referred to with approval in the Supreme Court in PJS v News Group Newspapers Ltd.

== Significance ==
Giving his reaction to the judgment, Mosley stated, "I am delighted with that judgment, which is devastating for the News of the World. It demonstrates that their Nazi lie was completely invented and had no justification".

After the incident, Mosley sought a confidence vote as President of the Fédération Internationale de l'Automobile, which he won by 103 votes to 55. Mosley stated that his intention to pursue further libel actions in France, Germany and Italy, where newspapers reprinted images of him engaging in sex acts. In France, criminal proceeding against News Group Newspapers Ltd resulted in a fine of €10,000, plus damages of €7,000 and €15,000 costs for Mosley.

=== Injunction ===
In April 2008, immediately after publication of the story, Mosley's lawyers asked the News of the World to remove the video of him and the five prostitutes from its website. The newspaper did so, but then put it back. Mosley then sought an injunction to prevent the republication of the video. However, he was denied as Justice David Eady concluded that the video was too widely available for the injunction to serve any purpose. In July 2008, Justice Eady granted a permanent injunction, restraining News Group Newspapers from showing the video.

=== Libel ===
In April 2009, a libel action was brought against News Group Newspapers Limited.

=== Impact on role as FIA President ===
The allegations made by the News of the World led to an "unofficial" agreement between the FIA and FOTA (Formula One Teams Association, by far the most powerful and globally-significant organization that interacts with the FIA) for Mosley to stand down from his role as president at the end of his current term. Many within the Formula 1, WTCC, WRC etc. communities had long been unhappy with Mosley's style of governance and used the Nazi aspects of the story to attempt to oust him from office. Although Mosley claimed that his sexual activities did not affect his role as president, his critics produced evidence in the form of official requests from a number of national governments to Mosley that he must not attend planned events, which indicated that he had clearly lost what little respect remained to him within the global motor-sport community. To the majority of the motor-racing community, fans, and journalists, the sexual revelations acted as a final nail in Mosley's coffin since they followed substantial allegations of corruption, championship fixing and unintelligible decisions, mostly in regard to Formula One that were made by Mosley personally and by the FIA under his watch.

Mosley was eventually replaced by the former Ferrari team principal Jean Todt in 2009.

== Application to European Court of Human Rights ==
On 29 September 2008, solicitors on behalf of Mosley filed an application to the European Court of Human Rights. He claimed that the UK's failure to legislate to prevent newspapers printing stories regarding individual private lives without first warning the individuals concerned was a breach of his rights under Articles 8 and 13 (the right for an effective remedy). The court ruled against him, finding that it fell within each state's margin of appreciation to determine whether to legislate on that matter.

== See also ==
- News of the World phone hacking affair
- Privacy in English law
- CTB v News Group Newspapers Ltd
