= Trespass in English law =

Trespass in English law is an area of tort law broadly divided into three groups: trespass to the person, trespass to goods, and trespass to land.

Trespass to the person comes in three variants: assault, which is "to act in such a way that the claimant believes he is about to be attacked"; battery, "the intentional and direct application of force to another person"; and false imprisonment, "depriving the claimant of freedom of movement, without a lawful justification for doing so". All three require that the act be a direct and intentional act, with indirect or unintentional acts falling under the tort of negligence. Battery and assault require the claimant to establish that the defendant intended to act, while false imprisonment is a tort of strict liability. The guiding principle behind all three is based on the statement of Robert Goff, LJ, who stated in Collins v Wilcock that "any person's body is inviolate", excepting normal, day-to-day physical contact.

Trespass to goods is defined as "wrongful physical interference with goods that are in the possession of another", and is covered not only by the common law, but also by the Torts (Interference with Goods) Act 1977. The "trespass" can be as little as touching or moving the goods, given the right circumstances. It is unknown whether intention is required for a claim under trespass to goods, as the matter has never gone to court; the courts have confirmed that for damages to be awarded for harm suffered, the harm must have been reasonably foreseeable.

Trespass to land involves the "unjustifiable interference with land which is in the immediate and exclusive possession of another"; it is both a tort and, in certain circumstances, a crime under the Criminal Justice and Public Order Act 1994. It is not necessary to prove that harm was suffered to bring a claim, and is instead actionable per se. While most trespasses to land are intentional, the courts have decided that it could also be committed negligently. Accidental trespass also incurs liability.

== Trespass to the person ==
The general principle is that a trespass to the person must be a direct and intentional act, while if it was indirect or unintentional the tort of negligence would be more appropriate, as established in Letang v Cooper. The tort of trespass to the person contains three possible types; assault, battery and false imprisonment.

=== Assault ===
In English law, an assault means to act in such a way that the claimant or victim apprehends the application of immediate unlawful force upon themselves. The key elements of the tort are therefore that the defendant acts, and does so in such a way that the claimant is put in fear of "immediate physical violence". There is no requirement that actual damage be caused. In R v Costanza, the courts held that threats made by a stalker could be assault, while in R v Ireland, the House of Lords said that in the right situation (specifically, harassing phone calls) silence could be enough. In some situations an act which would otherwise be assault can be mitigated by the language used. In Tuberville v Savage, the defendant reached for his sword and told the claimant that "if it were not [court] time, I would not take such language from you"; it was held that despite the threatening gesture, this meant the claimant was not in immediate danger. The actions must give the claimant reasonable expectation that the defendant is going to use violence; if a fist was raised in front of the claimant, it could be enough. If the fist was raised from inside a police van following arrest, it would not.

=== Battery ===
Battery is defined as "the intentional and direct application of force to another person", and has three elements; force, direct application and intent. The courts have also added a requirement of "hostility" or lack of consent in many cases. As with assault, there is no need to show that damage was caused. Any application of physical contact, regardless of harm caused, can constitute force. In Collins v Wilcock, a female police officer took hold of a woman's arm, intending to talk to her on suspicion of soliciting contrary to the Street Offences Act 1959. The woman scratched the female police officer's arm. As the female police officer had gone beyond her duties in grabbing the woman (since she did not intend to charge her with an offence, but was still using force) it was held that this constituted "force". Robert Goff LJ wrote that the fundamental principle is that any person's body is inviolate, except in situations where the bodily contact "[falls] within a general exception embracing all physical contacts which are generally acceptable in the ordinary conduct of daily life".

The defendant must intend to carry out the act which constitutes trespass for it to be valid. This does not require the defendant to intend harm; in Nash v Sheen, a hairdresser who put a tone rinse on the claimant (when the claimant had given permission for a perm) was found liable in battery after it caused a rash. In Livingstone v Ministry of Defence, the defendant, a soldier, had intended to shoot someone with a baton round, which went wide and hit the claimant. Even though he had not intended to hit the claimant, it was held that because he had intended to fire the baton round in the first place, he was liable. (Note: This application is known as transferred malice.) The final element occasionally added to the tort is the hostility of the action; in Wilson v Pringle, it was decided that the onus is on the claimant to show that the force was hostile, except in such situations where it is self-evident. This was undermined by R v F, in which Robert Goff wrote that he "respectfully doubts whether [the requirement to show hostility] is correct", in line with his comment in Collins.

An extension to battery was given in Wilkinson v Downton, where emotional distress was considered a possible battery despite no physical force being used. The defendant told the claimant (as a practical joke) that her husband had been seriously injured. As a result, the claimant suffered a nervous disorder and was thought to be suicidal for a time. It was held that such an action will be valid under battery where it is calculated to cause physical damage and does so. The principle was extended by Khorasandjian v Bush, in 1993, where there was a risk that the defendant's actions would cause physical or psychiatric damage. The tort set down in Wilkinson is normally considered a separate tort of intentional infliction of emotional distress.

=== False imprisonment ===
False imprisonment is defined as "depriving the claimant of freedom of movement, without a lawful justification for doing so". Unlike assault and battery, false imprisonment is a tort of strict liability: no intention on the behalf of the defendant is needed, but the imprisonment must be caused by a deliberate act (as decided in Sayers v Harlow Urban District Council, where a faulty lock, not a deliberate act from another party, caused a woman to become trapped in a public toilet) and must be unlawful. The imprisonment of a lawfully convicted criminal is not false, nor is the arrest of a suspect if done in line with the Serious Organised Crime and Police Act 2005 and Police and Criminal Evidence Act 1984.

Imprisonment is considered any restraint on the freedom of movement, for however short a time. In Austin and another v Metropolitan Police Commissioner, seven hours was considered a sufficient period of time to constitute false imprisonment (although the claim was ultimately rejected due to the circumstances of a potentially hostile crowd of demonstrators). The requirement is complete restraint; in Bird v Jones, the defendant fenced off part of a footpath for use as a viewing point for a boat race. The claimant, accustomed to walking across it, climbed into the enclosure; the defendants refused to let him pass. They were found not liable for false imprisonment, as another way across existed. There is on the other hand no requirement that the claimant actually attempt to leave, as in Grainger v Hill, or even that he knows he is being prevented from leaving, as in Meering v Graham-White Aviation Co Ltd.

=== Defences ===
There are many defences to trespasses against the person; the stranger are the right of parents to commit battery against their children for "reasonable chastisement" (abolished in Wales in 2020), and the right of the captain of a ship to discipline his crew, as in Hook v Cunard Steamship Co Ltd. There is also a right to eject a trespasser to land using reasonable force, and a defendant is also not liable for "inevitable accidents", as in Stanley v Powell, where a ricocheting pellet was ruled to be accidental. Individuals and bodies will not be liable for imprisonment, battery or assault if doing so in line with statutory authorities, such as the Criminal Law Act 1967.

A commonly used defence for the torts of trespass against the person is that of volenti non fit injuria, or consent. If a claimant participates in a sporting activity in which physical contact is ordinary conduct, such as rugby, they are considered to have consented. This is not the case if the physical contact went beyond what could be expected, as in R v Billinghurst, or where the injuries were suffered not from the claimant's participation in the sport but inadequate safety measures taken, as in Watson v British Boxing Board of Control. The same general rule applies to people who voluntarily take part in fights, although only if the injuries caused are proportionate, as in Lane v Holloway. If the claimant is informed by a doctor of the broad risks of a medical procedure, there will be no claim under trespass against the person for resulting harm caused; the claimant's agreement constitutes "real consent", as in Chatterton v Gerson. Consent for medical procedures is different in cases where the claimant does not have the mental capacity to consent. In F v West Berkshire Health Authority, it was held that in such situations the requirements are that there "must be a necessity to act when it is not practical to communicate with the assisted person ... [and] the action taken must be such as a reasonable person would in all the circumstances take, acting in the best interests of the assisted person".

Self-defence is also a valid defence to trespasses against the person, assuming that it constituted the use of "reasonable force which they honestly and reasonably believe is necessary to protect themselves or someone else, or property". The force used must be proportionate to the threat, as ruled in Cockroft v Smith. If the action is undertaken to prevent a crime, Section 3 of the Criminal Law Act 1967 permits it assuming that it is "reasonable under the circumstances".

== Trespass to goods ==
Trespass to goods is defined as "wrongful physical interference with goods that are in the possession of another". It is covered not only by the common law, but also by the Torts (Interference with Goods) Act 1977, which was written to clear up the confusing rules on trespass to goods which had evolved over the centuries. It is similar to the tort of conversion, which covers the interference with goods in a way which is inconsistent with the rights of the owner. "Physical interference" is usually the taking or destroying of goods, but can be as minor as touching or moving them in the right circumstances. In Kirk v Gregory, the defendant moved jewellery from one room to another, where it was stolen. The deceased owner's executor successfully sued her for trespass to goods. Goods cover almost any physical object, including animals, as in Slater v Swann, but not organs, as in AB & Ors v Leeds Teaching Hospital NHS Trust. "Possession" has the standard legal meaning, referring to the claimant's right to use, control or deal with the item. This can include owners, but also bailees.

It is unknown what mental element is expected in cases of trespass to goods; while trespass to the person requires intent, the requirements for trespass to goods have never been tested in court. The common remedy is damages, which may be awarded regardless of if any actual harm is suffered; where there is damage, the defendant will only be liable if he could have reasonably foreseen it, as in Kuwait Airways Corporation v Iraqi Airways Co (No 5). Valid defences are those of statutory authority, consent, where it is necessary to interfere with the goods, or jus tertii.

== Trespass to land ==
Trespass in English and Welsh law is mostly a civil tort rather than a criminal offence. The circumstances in which it is a criminal offence are usually trespass on educational premises, railway property, protected sites, etc. Trespass can be an element of a criminal offence when combined with criminal acts, most notably in the offence of burglary.

In English law, trespass to land involves the "unjustifiable interference with land which is in the immediate and exclusive possession of another". It is not necessary to prove that harm was suffered to bring a claim, and is instead actionable per se. While most trespasses to land are intentional, in League Against Cruel Sports v Scott, the courts decided that it could also be committed negligently. Accidental trespass also incurs liability, with an exception for entering land adjoining a road unintentionally (such as in a car accident), as in River Wear Commissioners v Adamson. Although previously a pure tort, the Criminal Justice and Public Order Act 1994 created some circumstances in which trespass to land can also be a crime.

Land is defined as the surface, subsoil, airspace and anything permanently attached to the land, such as houses. The rights of landowners over airspace are not unlimited; in Bernstein of Leigh v Skyviews & General Ltd, the action for trespass failed because the violation of airspace took place several hundred metres above the land. This was backed up by the Civil Aviation Act 1982, which provides that it is not trespass if the aircraft is flying at a reasonable height. An overhanging crane can constitute trespass, as in Woolerton v Costain, as can an advertising sign, as in Kelsen v Imperial Tobacco Co. Possession does not necessarily mean the ownership of land, but the right to eject or exclude others from it.

=== Interference ===
The main element of the tort is "interference". This must be both direct and physical, with indirect interference instead being covered by negligence or nuisance. "Interference" covers any physical entry to land, as well as the abuse of a right of entry. If the person has the right to enter the land but remains after this right expires, this is also trespass. It is also a trespass to throw anything on the land. For the purposes of trespass, the person who owns the land on which a road rests is treated as the owner; it is not, however, a trespass to use that road if public. In Hickman v Maisey, it was established that any use of a road that went beyond using it for its normal purpose could constitute a trespass, but this was altered by DPP v Jones. Lord Irvine, giving the leading judgment, said that "the public highway is a public place which the public may enjoy for any reasonable purpose, providing that the activity in question does not amount to a public or private nuisance and does not obstruct the highway by reasonably impeding the primary right of the public to pass and repass; within these qualifications there is a public right of peaceful assembly on the highway".

=== Defences ===
There are several defences to trespass to land; licence, justification by law, necessity and jus tertii. Licence is expressed or implied permission, given by the possessor of land, to be on that land. If a licence is lawfully revoked, a licence-holder becomes a trespasser if he remains on the land. Justification by law refers to those situations in which there is statutory authority permitting a person to go onto land, such as the Police and Criminal Evidence Act 1984, which allows the police to enter land for the purposes of carrying out an arrest. Jus tertii is where the defendant can prove that the land is not possessed by the claimant, but by a third party, as in Doe d Carter v Barnard. The exception to this defence is if the claimant is a tenant and the defendant a landlord who had no right to give the claimant his lease. Necessity is the situation in which it is vital to commit the trespass; in Esso Petroleum Co v Southport Corporation, the captain of a ship committed trespass by allowing oil to flood a shoreline. This was necessary to protect his ship and crew, however, and the defence of necessity was accepted.

== Bibliography ==
- Bermingham, Vera; Brennan, Carol (2008). Tort Law. Oxford University Press. ISBN 978-0-19-922798-3.
- Elliott, Catherine; Quinn, Francis (2007). Tort Law (6th ed.). Longman. ISBN 978-1-4058-4672-1.
- Smith, Kenneth; Keenan, Denis J. (2004). English Law (14th ed.). Pearson Education Ltd. ISBN 978-0-582-82291-7.
