= David Holgate =

The Right Honourable Lord Justice Holgate
- Royal coat of arms of the United Kingdom

Lord Justice of Appeal
- Incumbent
- Assumed office 1 October 2024
- Monarch: Charles III

High Court Judge King's Bench Division
- In office 2014–2024
- Monarchs: Elizabeth II; Charles III

Personal details
- Born: 3 August 1956 (age 70)
- Education: Exeter College, Oxford

Sir David John Holgate (born 3 August 1956), styled Lord Justice Holgate, is a Court of Appeal judge of England and Wales.

Holgate was educated at Davenant Foundation Grammar School and Exeter College, Oxford. He was called to the bar by the Middle Temple in 1978 and took silk in 1997. He served as Recorder from 2002 to 2014 and Deputy High Court Judge from 2008 to 2014.

On 1 December 2014, Holgate was appointed to be a Justice of the High Court and assigned to the Queen’s Bench Division, on the retirement of Mr Justice Ramsey, receiving the customary knighthood the following year. He has been President of the Upper Tribunal Lands Chamber since 2016 and Planning Liaison Judge since 2017.

Holgate was appointed a judge of the Court of Appeal on 1 October 2024.

On 13 September 2024, Holgate ruled against Woodhouse Colliery, a plan for the UK's first deep coal mine since 1986. He found that Michael Gove acted unlawfully in accepting West Cumbria Mining's claim that the mine would be net zero, because this relied on offsetting through carbon credits purchased from abroad.
