= Campbell v MGN Ltd =

2004 House of Lords decision on privacy in English law

Campbell v Mirror Group Newspapers Ltd
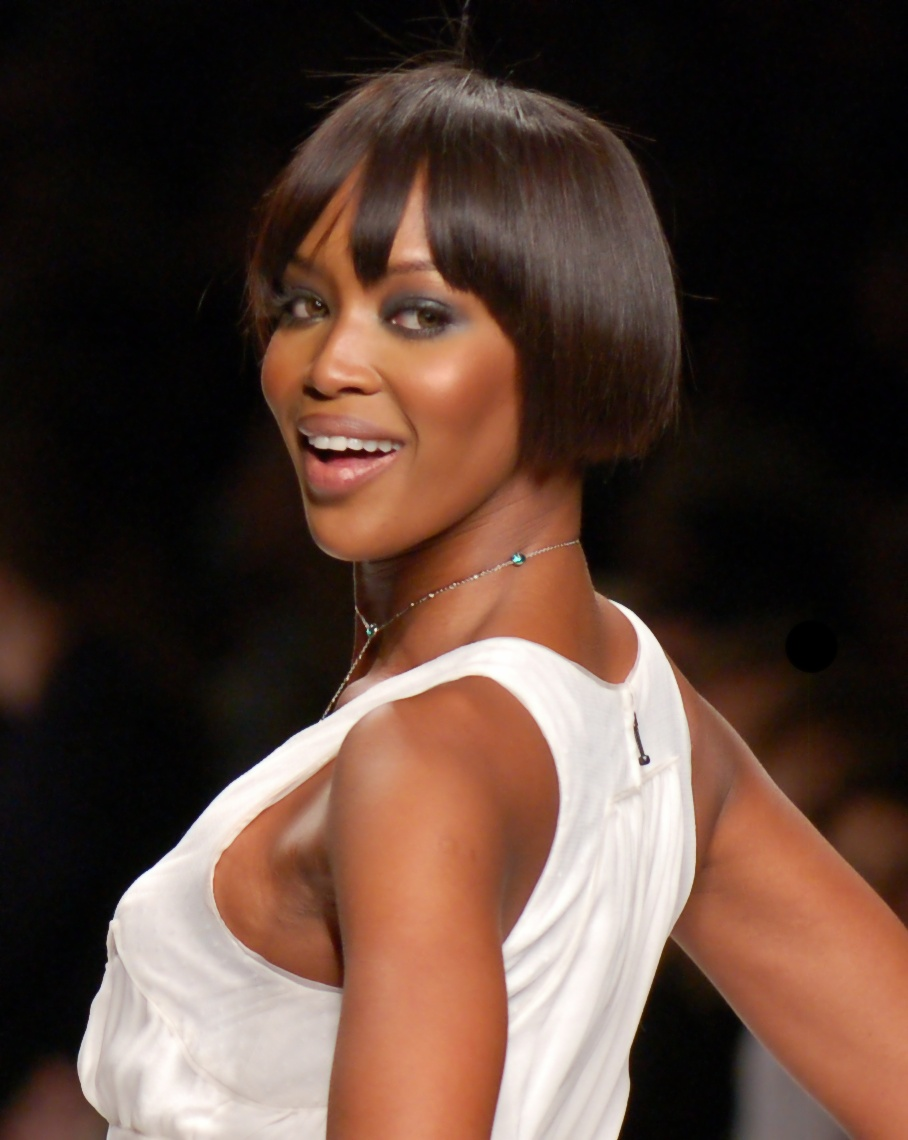
- Court: House of Lords
- Transcript: Full text of judgment

Court membership
- Judges sitting: Lord Nicholls, Lord Hoffmann, Baroness Hale, Lord Carswell, Lord Hope

Campbell v Mirror Group Newspapers Ltd [2004] UKHL 22 was a House of Lords decision regarding human rights and privacy in English law.

== Facts ==
The British model Naomi Campbell was photographed leaving a rehabilitation clinic after public denials that she was a recovering drug addict. The photographs were published in the Daily Mirror, a publication owned by Mirror Group Newspapers Ltd (MGN).

Campbell sought damages under the English law through her lawyers Schillings, which engaged Richard Spearman QC and instigated a claim for breach of confidence by engaging Article 8 of the Human Rights Act, which would require the court to comply with the European Convention on Human Rights (ECHR). The claim sought a ruling that the English tort action for breach of confidence, subject to the ECHR provisions upholding the right to private and family life, would require the court to recognise the private nature of the published information and to hold that there was a breach of her privacy.

Rather than challenge the disclosure of the fact she had been a drug addict, Campbell challenged the disclosure of information about the location of her Narcotics Anonymous meetings and the pictures that were used. The photographs, they argued, formed part of that information, would be a deterrent to her seeking further medical treatment and others would be discouraged from entering in to medical treatment at the clinic if they knew that their image might appear in the press.

== Judgment ==
=== First instance ===
In the High Court, MGN was found liable and Campbell was awarded £3,500 damages, additionally ordering MGN to pay Campbell's £750,000 in legal fees. MGN appealed.

=== Court of Appeal ===
In October 2002, the Court of Appeal found that MGN was not liable and that the story and the photographs could be published as the information was in the public interest as they demonstrated "that Ms Campbell had been deceiving the public when she said that she did not take drugs". In ruling that the photographs "were a legitimate, if not an essential," part of the reporting, the court found that it was within journalists' margin of appreciation to decide whether such "peripheral" information should be included. The court also ordered Campbell to pay MGN's legal fees, estimated at around £350,000.

Campbell appealed on the basis, inter alia, that the aforementioned breach of confidence had occurred and was subject to human rights principles of privacy.

=== House of Lords ===
On 6 May 2004, the House of Lords upheld Campbell's appeal, finding MGN liable by majority vote of 3-2. They also reinstated the damages initially awarded to her by the High Court. Lords Nicholls and Hoffmann dissented. Baroness Hale, Lord Hope and Lord Carswell held that the picture added something of "real significance". The court engaged in a balancing test by firstly determining whether the applicant had a reasonable expectation of privacy (thus determining whether Article 8 was involved). It then considered whether, if the claimant was successful, that would result in a significant inference with freedom of expression (balancing Article 8 with Article 10). It was held that Campbell's right to privacy (Schedule 1, Part I, Article 8) outweighed MGN's right to freedom of expression (ECHR Article 10).

Lord Hoffmann and Lord Nicholls dissented on the grounds that as The Mirror was allowed to publish the fact that she was a drug addict and that she was receiving treatment for her addiction that printing the pictures of her leaving her NA meeting was within the margin of appreciation of the editors, as it was allowed to state that she was an addict and receiving treatment for her addiction. Lord Nicholls observed that "confidence" was an artificial term for what could more naturally be termed "privacy".

Lord Hope of Craighead noted that a duty of confidence arises wherever the defendant knows or ought to know that the claimant can reasonably expect their privacy to be protected and so approved A v B plc. If there is doubt, the test "what is highly offensive to a reasonable person" in the plaintiff's position, can be used for guidance.

Baroness Hale stated:

The basic principles

132. Neither party to this appeal has challenged the basic principles which have emerged from the Court of Appeal in the wake of the Human Rights Act 1998. The 1998 Act does not create any new cause of action between private persons. But if there is a relevant cause of action applicable, the court as a public authority must act compatibly with both parties' Convention rights. In a case such as this, the relevant vehicle will usually be the action for breach of confidence, as Lord Woolf CJ held in A v B plc [2002] EWCA Civ 337, [2003] QB 195, 202, para 4:

"[Articles 8 and 10] have provided new parameters within which the court will decide, in an action for breach of confidence, whether a person is entitled to have his privacy protected by the court or whether the restriction of freedom of expression which such protection involves cannot be justified. The court's approach to the issues which the applications raise has been modified because, under section 6 of the 1998 Act, the court, as a public authority, is required not to 'act in a way which is incompatible with a Convention right'. The court is able to achieve this by absorbing the rights which articles 8 and 10 protect into the long-established action for breach of confidence. This involves giving a new strength and breadth to the action so that it accommodates the requirements of these articles."

== Aftermaths ==
In English courts, MGN Limited was ordered to pay her success fee (an extra payment to her lawyers that she was contracted to pay in the event of success). MGN Limited appealed the order to European Court of Human Rights. ECHR finally ruled that the recoverable success fee violated Article 10 of the European Convention on Human Rights.

== See also ==
- English tort law
- Douglas v Hello! Ltd [2005] EWCA Civ 595
- His Royal Highness the Prince of Wales v Associated Newspapers Ltd [2006] EWCA Civ 1776
- Rantzen v Mirror Group Newspapers (1986) Ltd and others
- Privacy in English law
