= Copland v United Kingdom =

- Court: European Court of Human Rights
- Citation: [2007] ECHR 253

Keywords
- Health

Copland v United Kingdom [2007] ECHR 253 is an ECHR case about UK labour law, English contract law case and health care in the UK.

== Facts ==
Lynette Copland was employed by Carmarthenshire College as personal assistant to the College Principal. The Deputy Principal had monitored her email. The Deputy then insinuated to other staff that she was in a personal relationship with another employee. The UK claimed the College could monitor Copland’s emails and use of the internet. The college’s statutory powers enabled it to do ‘anything necessary or expedient for the purposes of providing higher or further education’. ‘The applicant also believed that there had been detailed and comprehensive logging of the length of calls, the number of calls received and made and the telephone numbers of individuals calling her. She stated that on at least one occasion the DP became aware of the name of an individual with whom she had exchanged incoming and outgoing telephone calls.’ An internet ‘monitoring took the form of analysing the web sites visited, the times and dates of the visits to the web sites and their duration and that this monitoring took place from October to November 1999.’ She claimed this violated her right to private life and correspondence under ECHR article 8.

== Judgment ==
The European Court of Human Rights held an implied right to monitor internet ‘unpersuasive’.

A. Law of privacy

18. At the relevant time there was no general right to privacy in English law.

19. Since the implementation of the Human Rights Act 1998 on 2 October 2000, the courts have been required to read and give effect to primary legislation in a manner which is compatible with Convention rights so far as possible. The Act also made it unlawful for any public authority, including a court, to act in a manner which is incompatible with a Convention right unless required to do so by primary legislation, thus providing for the development of the common law in accordance with Convention rights. In the case of Douglas v Hello! Ltd ([2001] 1 WLR 992), Sedley LJ indicated that he was prepared to find that there was a qualified right to privacy under English law, but the Court of Appeal did not rule on the point.

20. The Regulation of Investigatory Powers Act 2000 (“the 2000 Act”) provided for the regulation of, inter alia, interception of communications. The Telecommunications (Lawful Business Practice) Regulations 2000 were promulgated under the 2000 Act and came into force on 24 October 2000. The Regulations set out the circumstances in which employers could record or monitor employees' communications (such as e-mail or telephone) without the consent of either the employee or the other party to the communication. Employers were required to take reasonable steps to inform employees that their communications might be intercepted.

B. Contractual damages for breach of trust and confidence by employer

21. The House of Lords in Malik v Bank of Credit and Commerce International SA [1997] IRLR 462 confirmed that, as a matter of law, a general term is implied into each employment contract that an employer will not “without reasonable and proper cause, conduct itself in a manner calculated and likely to destroy or seriously damage the relationship of confidence and trust between employer and employee”. In Malik, the House of Lords was concerned with the award of so-called “stigma compensation” where an ex-employee is unable to find further employment due to association with a dishonest former employer. In considering the damages that could be awarded for breach of the obligation of trust and confidence, the House were solely concerned with the payment of compensation for financial loss resulting from handicap in the labour market. Lord Nicholls expressly noted that, “(f)or the present purposes I am not concerned with the exclusion of damages for injured feelings, the present case is concerned only with financial loss.”

22. In limiting the scope of the implied term of trust and confidence in Malik, Lord Steyn stated as follows:

“the implied mutual obligation of trust and confidence applies only where there is 'no reasonable and proper cause' for the employer's conduct, and then only if the conduct is calculated to destroy or seriously damage the relationship of trust and confidence. That circumscribes the potential reach and scope of the implied obligation.”

[...]

32. Although there had been some monitoring of the applicant's telephone calls, e-mails and internet usage prior to November 1999, this did not extend to the interception of telephone calls or the analysis of the content of websites visited by her. The monitoring thus amounted to nothing more than the analysis of automatically generated information to determine whether College facilities had been used for personal purposes which, of itself, did not constitute a failure to respect private life or correspondence. The case of P.G. and J.H. v. the United Kingdom, no. 44787/98, ECHR 2001 IX, could be distinguished since there actual interception of telephone calls occurred. There were significant differences from the case of Halford v United Kingdom, judgment of 25 June 1997, Reports of Judgments and Decisions 1997 III, where the applicant's telephone calls were intercepted on a telephone which had been designated for private use and, in particular her litigation against her employer.

[...]

41. According to the Court's case-law, telephone calls from business premises are prima facie covered by the notions of “private life” and “correspondence” for the purposes of Article 8 § 1 (see Halford, cited above, § 44 and Amann v. Switzerland [GC], no. 27798/95, § 43, ECHR 2000 II). It follows logically that e-mails sent from work should be similarly protected under Article 8, as should information derived from the monitoring of personal internet usage.

42. The applicant in the present case had been given no warning that her calls would be liable to monitoring, therefore she had a reasonable expectation as to the privacy of calls made from her work telephone (see Halford, § 45). The same expectation should apply in relation to the applicant's e-mail and internet usage.

2. Whether there was any interference with the rights guaranteed under Article 8.

43. The Court recalls that the use of information relating to the date and length of telephone conversations and in particular the numbers dialled can give rise to an issue under Article 8 as such information constitutes an “integral element of the communications made by telephone” (see Malone v. the United Kingdom, judgment of 2 August 1984, Series A no. 82, § 84). The mere fact that these data may have been legitimately obtained by the College, in the form of telephone bills, is no bar to finding an interference with rights guaranteed under Article 8 (ibid). Moreover, storing of personal data relating to the private life of an individual also falls within the application of Article 8 § 1 (see Amann, cited above, § 65). Thus, it is irrelevant that the data held by the college were not disclosed or used against the applicant in disciplinary or other proceedings.

44. Accordingly, the Court considers that the collection and storage of personal information relating to the applicant's telephone, as well as to her e-mail and internet usage, without her knowledge, amounted to an interference with her right to respect for her private life and correspondence within the meaning of Article 8.

[...]

47. The Court is not convinced by the Government's submission that the College was authorised under its statutory powers to do “anything necessary or expedient” for the purposes of providing higher and further education, and finds the argument unpersuasive. Moreover, the Government do not seek to argue that any provisions existed at the relevant time, either in general domestic law or in the governing instruments of the College, regulating the circumstances in which employers could monitor the use of telephone, e-mail and the internet by employees. Furthermore, it is clear that the Telecommunications (Lawful Business Practice) Regulations 2000 (adopted under the Regulation of Investigatory Powers Act 2000) which make such provision were not in force at the relevant time.

48. Accordingly, as there was no domestic law regulating monitoring at the relevant time, the interference in this case was not “in accordance with the law” as required by Article 8 § 2 of the Convention. The Court would not exclude that the monitoring of an employee's use of a telephone, e-mail or internet at the place of work may be considered “necessary in a democratic society” in certain situations in pursuit of a legitimate aim. However, having regard to its above conclusion, it is not necessary to pronounce on that matter in the instant case.

== See also ==
- United Kingdom labour law
- English contract case law
