= National Union of Rail, Maritime and Transport Workers v United Kingdom =

RMT v United Kingdom
- Court: European Court of Human Rights
- Citation: [2014] ECHR 366

Keywords
- Ballots, secondary action, freedom of association

National Union of Rail, Maritime and Transport Workers v United Kingdom [2014] ECHR 366 is a UK labour law case, concerning collective action and the right to take secondary action under ECHR article 11. It held that UK restrictions cannot be questioned on human rights grounds.

== Facts ==
The National Union of Rail, Maritime and Transport Workers (RMT) claimed that it should be able to conduct strike action across a company group owned called Jarvis Group plc, although its members were specifically in dispute with a separate one of its subsidiaries, named Fastline Ltd, and a transferee of its employees, Hydrex. Fastline Ltd was part of the Jarvis plc group. This also included Jarvis Rail Ltd, which did rail engineering. Together the two subsidiaries had 1200 staff, and 569 were RMT members. In August 2007, Fastline transferred 20 employees to Hydrex Equipment (UK) Ltd with terms preserved under TUPER 2006, though other Hydrex workers were paid less and unions had less influence there. In March 2009, Hydrex stated that it intended to make the transferred employees’ terms the same as others, due to difficult market conditions, reducing salary by 36-40%. RMT organised a strike ballot among the 17 workers, who voted in favour on 6 to 9 November. They organised pickets on sites where they worked. The employer warned this was unlawful, not near an employer's premises. A second strike on 18–20 November was postponed when Hydrex said it would talk. Nine votes cast rejected a new offer, but a strike was ineffective against Hydrex, and RMT wished to organise a larger strike across the company: Jarvis employees would have supported the strike. Both Jarvis and Hydrex were put into administration in March 2010 and November 2011. Hydrex was bought by another company, sold on again in November 2012.

EDF Energy Powerlink Ltd operated electric power on the Underground, with RMT recognised, and 270 staff at three sites, Tufnell Park with 155: 52 RMT members among them. The company should not have known which were union members because it did not deduct union subscriptions from staff wages. RMT called a strike after June 2009 negotiations on pay and terms failed, and gave the ballot notice on 24 September, describing the worker category as ‘Engineer/Technician’. The day after, the company wrote saying it did not recognise the ‘technician’ category, saying that the notice did not therefore fulfil the statutory requirements. RMT said it had. The company filed for an injunction, granted by Blake J on 23 October 2009. During permission for appeals by 26 January 2010, the dispute was resolved, after RMT got job descriptions and gave notice of a new ballot in support.

== Judgment ==
The European Court of Human Rights held that a ban on secondary action pursued a legitimate aim, in seeking to protect the rights of others. It was justified in pursuit of that aim because the interference with freedom of association was not far reaching in light of the wide margin of appreciation. It was true that the UK's absolute prohibition was at the extreme end of one spectrum, among a small number of European countries, but it could not be found to be disproportionate.

83. It remains to be determined whether the statutory ban on secondary industrial action, as it affected the ability of the applicant to protect the interests of its Hydrex members, can be regarded as being “necessary in a democratic society”. To be so considered, it must be shown that the interference complained of corresponds to a “pressing social need”, that the reasons given by the national authorities to justify it are relevant and sufficient and that it is proportionate to the legitimate aim pursued.

84. The Court will consider first the applicant’s argument that the right to take strike action must be regarded as an essential element of trade union freedom under Article 11, so that to restrict it would be to impair the very essence of freedom of association.

[...]

96. With respect to the ILO Committee of Experts, the Government made a similar observation - that body was not formally competent to give authoritative interpretations to ILO Conventions. It drew the Court’s attention to an on-going disagreement within the ILO precisely regarding the legal status or even existence of a right to strike. The Committee of Experts had recently recognised the limits of its role, stating that “[its] opinions and recommendations are not binding within the ILO supervisory process and are not binding outside the ILO unless an international instrument expressly establishes them as such or the supreme court of a country so decides of its own volition.” (from the foreword to Collective Bargaining in the Public Service: A Way Forward, a report of the ILO Committee of Experts to the 102nd session of the International Labour Conference, 2013). This text goes on to describe the Committee of Expert’s interpretations as “soft law”. The foreword concludes (§8):

“As regards the interpretation of ILO Conventions and the role of the International Court of Justice in this area, the Committee has pointed out since 1990 that its terms of reference do not enable it to give definitive interpretations of Conventions, competence to do so being vested in the International Court of Justice by article 37 of the Constitution of the ILO. It has stated, nevertheless, that in order to carry out its function of determining whether the requirements of Conventions are being respected, the Committee has to consider the content and meaning of the provisions of Conventions, to determine their legal scope, and where appropriate to express its views on these matters. The Committee has consequently considered that, in so far as its views are not contradicted by the International Court of Justice, they should be considered as valid and generally recognized. The Committee considers the acceptance of these considerations to be indispensable to maintaining the principle of legality and, consequently, to the certainty of law required for the proper functioning of the International Labour Organization.”

97. The Court does not consider that this clarification requires it to reconsider this body’s role as a point of reference and guidance for the interpretation of certain provisions of the Convention (see generally Demir and Baykara, cited above, §§65-86). While the Government referred to disagreements voiced at the 101st International Labour Conference, 2012, it appears from the records of that meeting that the disagreement originated with and were confined to the employer group (Provisional Record of the 101st Session of the International Labour Conference, 19 (Rev.), §§82-90). The Governments who took the floor during that discussion are reported as saying that the right to strike was “well established and widely accepted as a fundamental right”. The representative of the Government of Norway added that her country fully accepted the Committee of Experts’ interpretation that the right to strike was protected under Convention No. 87. In any event, the respondent Government accepted in the present proceedings that the right afforded under Article 11 to join a trade union normally implied the ability to strike (see paragraph 62 above).

98. The foregoing analysis of the interpretative opinions emitted by the competent bodies set up under the most relevant international instruments mirrors the conclusion reached on the comparative material before the Court, to wit that with its outright ban on secondary industrial action, the respondent State finds itself at the most restrictive end of a spectrum of national regulatory approaches on this point and is out of line with a discernible international trend calling for a less restrictive approach. The significance that such a conclusion may have for the Court’s assessment in a given case was explained in the Demir and Baykara judgment in the following terms (at §85):

“The consensus emerging from specialised international instruments and from the practice of Contracting States may constitute a relevant consideration for the Court when it interprets the provisions of the Convention in specific cases.”

The Grand Chamber’s statement reflects the distinct character of the Court’s review compared with that of the supervisory procedures of the ILO and the European Social Charter. The specialised international monitoring bodies operating under those procedures have a different standpoint, shown in the more general terms used to analyse the ban on secondary action. In contrast, it is not the Court’s task to review the relevant domestic law in the abstract, but to determine whether the manner in which it actually affected the applicant infringed the latter’s rights under Article 11 of the Convention (see Von Hannover v. Germany (no. 2) [GC], nos. 40660/08 and 60641/08, §116, ECHR 2012; also Kart v. Turkey [GC], no. 8917/05, §§ 85-87, ECHR 2009 (extracts)). The applicant as well as the third parties dwelt on the possible effect of the ban in various hypothetical scenarios, which could go as far as to exclude any form of industrial action at all if the workers directly concerned were not in a position to take primary action, thereby, unlike in the present case, striking at the very substance of trade union freedom. They also considered that the ban could make it easy for employers to exploit the law to their advantage through resort to various legal stratagems, such as de-localising work-centres, outsourcing work to other companies and adopting complex corporate structures in order to transfer work to separate legal entities or to hive off companies (see paragraphs 33 and 37 above). In short, trade unions could find themselves severely hampered in the performance of their legitimate, normal activities in protecting their members’ interests. These alleged, far-reaching negative effects of the statutory ban do not however arise in the situation at Hydrex. The Court’s review is bounded by the facts submitted for examination in the case. This being so, the Court considers that the negative assessments made by the relevant monitoring bodies of the ILO and European Social Charter are not of such persuasive weight for determining whether the operation of the statutory ban on secondary strikes in circumstances such as those complained of in the present case remained within the range of permissible options open to the national authorities under Article 11 of the Convention.

99. The domestic authorities’ power of appreciation is not unlimited, however, but goes hand in hand with European supervision, it being the Court’s task to give a final ruling on whether a particular restriction is reconcilable with freedom of association as protected by Article 11 (Vörður Ólafsson v. Iceland, no. 20161/06, §76, ECHR 2010). The Government have argued that the “pressing social need” for maintaining the statutory ban on secondary strikes is to shield the domestic economy from the disruptive effects of such industrial action, which, if permitted, would pose a risk to the country’s economic recovery. In the sphere of social and economic policy, which must be taken to include a country’s industrial relations policy, the Court will generally respect the legislature’s policy choice unless it is “manifestly without reasonable foundation” (Carson and Others v. the United Kingdom [GC], no. 42184/05, §61, ECHR 2010). Moreover, the Court has recognised the “special weight” to be accorded to the role of the domestic policy-maker in matters of general policy on which opinions within a democratic society may reasonably differ widely (see in the context of Article 10 of the Convention the case MGN Limited v. the United Kingdom, no. 39401/04, § 200, 18 January 2011, referring in turn to Hatton and Others v. the United Kingdom [GC], no. 36022/97, §97, ECHR 2003-VIII, where the Court adverted to the “direct democratic legitimation” that the legislature enjoys). The ban on secondary action has remained intact for over twenty years, notwithstanding two changes of government during that time. This denotes a democratic consensus in support of it, and an acceptance of the reasons for it, which span a broad spectrum of political opinion in the United Kingdom. These considerations lead the Court to conclude that in their assessment of how the broader public interest is best served in their country in the often charged political, social and economic context of industrial relations, the domestic legislative authorities relied on reasons that were both relevant and sufficient for the purposes of Article 11.

100. The Court must also examine whether or not the contested restriction offended the principle of proportionality. The applicant argued that it did, given its absolute character, which completely excluded any balancing of the competing rights and interests at stake and prohibited any differentiation between situations. The Government defended the legislature’s decision to eschew case-by-case consideration in favour of a uniform rule, and contended that any less restrictive approach would be impracticable and ineffective. In their submission, the inevitable variations in the potentially numerous individual cases such as the present one are not such as to disturb the overall balance struck by Parliament.

101. The Court observes that the general character of a law justifying an interference is not inherently offensive to the principle of proportionality. As it has recently recalled, a State may, consistently with the Convention, adopt general legislative measures applying to pre-defined situations without providing for individualised assessments with regard to the individual, necessarily differing and perhaps complex circumstances of each single case governed by the legislation (see Animal Defenders International v. the United Kingdom [GC], no. 48876/08, §107, 22 April 2013, with many further references concerning different provisions of the Convention and Protocol No. 1). That does not mean the specific facts of the individual case are without significance for the Court’s analysis of proportionality. Indeed, they evidence the impact in practice of the general measure and are thus material to its proportionality (ibid., §108). As already stated, the interference with the applicant’s freedom of association in the set of facts at Hydrex relied on by it cannot objectively be regarded as especially far-reaching.

102. The risks attendant upon any relaxation of the ban constitute a relevant consideration, which is primarily for the State to assess (ibid., §108). In this respect, the applicant has argued that it would have limited its action to a secondary strike at Jarvis, with no further spill-over effects. That can only be a matter of speculation however. As the materials in the case- file show, the very reason that caused Parliament to curb the broad scope for secondary action was its capacity, pre-1980, to spread far and fast beyond the original industrial dispute. It is to that situation that, according to the applicant, the United Kingdom should return if it is to conform to the requirements of Article 11.

103. As has been recognised in the case-law, it is legitimate for the authorities to be guided by considerations of feasibility, as well as of the practical difficulties - which, for some legislative schemes, may well be large-scale - to which an individuated approach could give rise, such as uncertainty, endless litigation, disproportionate public expenditure to the detriment of the taxpayer and possibly arbitrariness (ibid.). In this regard it is relevant to recall that for a period of ten years, 1980-1990, the United Kingdom found it possible to operate with a lighter restriction on secondary action (see paragraphs 23-24 above). The Government have not argued that this legislative regime was attended by the difficulties referred to above, or that this was why the ban was introduced. The applicant did not comment in detail on the legal position during that period. It took the view that the question of its compatibility with the Convention was “of entirely academic interest”, though added that were the point relevant it would argue such a restriction would not be acceptable. The Court observes that though the legislative history of the United Kingdom points to the existence of conceivable alternatives to the ban, that is not determinative of the matter. For the question is not whether less restrictive rules should have been adopted or whether the State can establish that, without the prohibition, the legitimate aim would not be achieved. It is rather whether, in adopting the general measure it did, the legislature acted within the margin of appreciation afforded to it (Animal Defenders, §110) - which, for the reasons developed above, the Court has found to be a broad one - and whether, overall, a fair balance was struck. Although the applicant has adduced cogent arguments of trade union solidarity and efficacy, these have not persuaded the Court that the United Kingdom Parliament lacked sufficient policy and factual reasons to consider the impugned ban on secondary industrial action as being "necessary in a democratic society”.

104. The foregoing considerations lead the Court to conclude that the facts of the specific situation challenged in the present case do not disclose an unjustified interference with the applicant’s right to freedom of association, the essential elements of which the applicant was able to exercise, in representing its members, in negotiating with the employer on behalf of its members who were in dispute with the employer and in organising a strike of those members at their place of work (see paragraphs 15-16 above). In this legislative policy area of recognised sensitivity, the respondent State enjoys a margin of appreciation broad enough to encompass the existing statutory ban on secondary action, there being no basis in the circumstances of this case to consider the operation of that ban in relation to the impugned facts at Hydrex as entailing a disproportionate restriction on the applicant’s right under Article 11.

105. Accordingly, no violation of Article 11 of the Convention can be held to have occurred on the facts of the present case.

106. In closing, the Court would stress that its jurisdiction is limited to the Convention. It has no competence to assess the respondent State’s compliance with the relevant standards of the ILO or the European Social Charter, the latter containing a more specific and exacting norm regarding industrial action. Nor should the conclusion reached in this case be understood as calling into question the analysis effected on the basis of those standards and their purposes by the ILO Committee of Experts and by the ECSR.

== See also ==
- UK labour law
