= Theakston v MGN Ltd =

Theakston v MGN Ltd [2002] EWHC 137 (QB) was a High Court judgment in which British television presenter Jamie Theakston attempted to injunct the Sunday People from publishing a story about how he visited a brothel in Mayfair, London.

Theakston argued that the publication of the story breached his right to privacy under Article 8 of the European Convention of Human Rights, that the activities had taken place in private, and therefore should be treated as confidential and that there was no public interest in publication. The Sunday People argued that the publication of the story was in the public interest given the concern of the British Broadcasting Corporation to ensure that presenters of programmes aimed at younger people conduct themselves appropriately in public.

The court were sceptical of Theakston's assertion that he only realised that he was in a brothel when other prostitutes entered the room.

== See also ==
- English privacy law
- Streisand effect
