= British Boxing Board of Control =

Governing body of professional boxing in the United Kingdom

- Sport: Professional boxing
- Jurisdiction: United Kingdom, Isle of Man and Channel Islands
- Abbreviation: BBBofC
- Regional affiliation: European Boxing Union
- Headquarters: 11 St Andrew's Crescent, Cardiff, Wales; 51.4849°N 3.1747°W
- President: John Williamson
- Chairman: Charles Giles
- Secretary: Robert W. Smith

Official website
- bbbofc.com

The British Boxing Board of Control (BBBofC) is the governing body of professional boxing in the United Kingdom.

== History ==
=== Origins and the 1929 reorganisation ===
Historian John Harding traces the Board to 1914, when an early body was set up and then put on hold during the First World War. He records a June 1918 announcement from the National Sporting Club (NSC) premises that a board had been established to govern professional boxing. Miles Templeton, writing as the Board's historian, dates its establishment to 29 May 1918. Templeton records that the council included ten NSC members, ten officers from the armed forces, two members of the Amateur Boxing Association and a Liverpool Sporting Association representative. The Liverpool Echo reported on 30 May that the Board had been formed and that its rules had been approved on 27 May. In June, the Racine Journal-News reported that the Board would adopt the NSC's rules and act as a central body of appeal.

The Board added professional boxers to its governing committee. Past and present Lonsdale Belt holders chose Bombardier Billy Wells, Jim Driscoll and Pat O'Keeffe as the first boxer representatives. The three helped administer the Professional Boxers' Benevolent Fund, which supported former boxers in financial difficulty.

Guy Deghy, a historian of the NSC, describes an attempt to set up a board in 1919 and writes that independent promoters suspected it was an extension of the NSC. Jean-François Loudcher and Dave Day also date the Board's formation to 1919.

By 1922 the Board was operating from the NSC in Covent Garden. In their history of the club, Arthur Frederick Bettinson and B. Bennison disputed the claim that the Board was simply the club under another name.

In January 1929 a meeting at Australia House in London approved Charles Donmall's plans to reorganise the Board. Commercial promoters had three voting representatives on the new Board. By June, notices in the press were calling on promoters, managers, referees and boxers to take out licences. Lord Lonsdale was president of the reorganised Board. Boxers, managers and referees also had representatives on it. The Board licensed its first boxer in April 1929. By the end of the year 600 boxers had applied for licences. The reconstituted Board issued the NSC a promoter's licence.

=== British titles and the colour bar ===
From 1929, the Board's colour bar restricted British championship bouts to boxers with two white parents. The rule prevented Len Johnson from challenging for a British title.

In July 1936 the Board decided to impose a five per cent levy on tournaments with gross takings of at least £2,500. It took over the issuing of Lonsdale Belts, and promoters needed the Board's permission to stage championship contests. Under the original NSC rules, boxers who won a Lonsdale Belt outright were entitled to a pension of £1 a week for life from the age of 50. In November 1936, Dick Smith, Pat O'Keeffe and Tancy Lee asked the later NSC about their pensions. The club referred the matter to the Board because it now issued the belts. Donmall replied on the Board's behalf that the Board could do nothing and that its own belts carried no pension entitlement. At the outbreak of the Second World War, two scheduled British title contests were cancelled. On 30 September 1939, Jackie Paterson and Paddy Ryan fought for the vacant British flyweight title in Glasgow. In 1941 the Board's colour bar prevented Tommy Martin, who was serving in the Royal Air Force, from challenging for a British title. Walter Green raised his case in the House of Commons. Harold Moody of the League of Coloured Peoples asked the Board to reconsider the rule, but it declined to discuss it.

The Board agreed to abolish the colour bar in July 1947. Its new rule took effect in 1948 and required British title contenders to have been born in Britain and to live there. Their fathers had to have been British subjects and resident in Britain when the boxers were born.

On 28 June 1948, Dick Turpin beat Vince Hawkins on points at Villa Park to win the British middleweight title. Turpin already held the British Empire middleweight title and was the first Black boxer to win a British title under the Board.

In 1968 the Board introduced a ten-year residence qualification that allowed boxers born abroad to compete for British titles. In 1970, Jamaican-born Bunny Sterling beat Mark Rowe for the British middleweight title, becoming the first Caribbean immigrant to win a British title.

=== Medical regulation and the move to Cardiff ===
In 1950 the Board established a medical sub-committee under its chief medical officer, John Graham. It appointed medical officers to its regional areas and required applicants for a boxer's licence to undergo an examination by a registered doctor.

After Michael Watson sustained a brain injury during a bout against Chris Eubank in 1991, the Board brought in new medical rules. These required resuscitation equipment at ringside and an ambulance crew able to take an injured boxer to a neurosurgical unit that had been notified in advance. Watson won his case against the Board in the High Court in 1999. In December 2000 the Court of Appeal upheld the ruling that the Board had breached its duty of care by failing to require adequate provision for resuscitation at ringside. The Watson case brought the Board close to bankruptcy. Its general secretary, Simon Block, recalled that the Board went into administration and moved its headquarters from London to Cardiff. Its chairman, Lord Brooks of Tremorfa, backed the move, and the stewards rejected a proposal to stay in London.

=== Women in professional boxing ===
The Board initially refused Jane Couch a professional licence, arguing that menstruation made women more prone to accidents in the ring. In March 1998, with support from the Equal Opportunities Commission, Couch won her sex discrimination case against the Board. The tribunal found that the Board had rejected her application on medical grounds without having a Board doctor examine her. The Western Area Council subsequently recommended her application. After Couch received medical clearance, the Board granted her a licence on 22 June 1998, the first professional boxing licence it had issued to a woman.

The BBBofC gives out the British Boxer of the Year award. Natasha Jonas became the first woman to win this award upon winning it for the year of 2022. Later, in 2023, Jonas became the first black woman to receive a manager's license from the BBBofC.

== Governance and licensing ==
The Board's seven Area Councils assess licence applications and recommend whether the Board should grant them. Only the Board can issue a licence. The councils can withdraw licences, bring disciplinary proceedings and arbitrate disputes between licence holders. Licence holders can appeal against decisions of the Board or an Area Council. The Stewards of Appeal hear these cases.

The seven areas are Central, Midlands, Northern, Northern Ireland, Scottish, Southern and Welsh. The Central Area includes the Isle of Man, and the Southern Area includes the Channel Islands.

In October 1979, the Department of Employment said it issued work permits for overseas boxers only for bouts licensed by the Board. By March 1980, eligible overseas boxers could also obtain permits for bouts licensed by the National Boxing Council if they were to face British or long-resident overseas opponents. The promoter Frank Warren helped set up the Council.

The Luxembourg Boxing Federation sanctioned the July 2012 bout between David Haye and Derek Chisora. Neither boxer held a licence from the British Board. The Board threatened to withdraw the licences of those involved in promoting the fight. In response, the Luxembourg federation and several licence holders said they had begun legal proceedings against the Board. The bout went ahead at Upton Park in London on 14 July.

== Championships ==
The Board can order a British champion to defend the title against a named challenger or select two boxers to contest a vacant title. Area Councils have the same powers for area championships.

In 2023 the Board sanctioned its first women's British title fight. On 6 May, Lauren Price defeated Kirstie Bavington in Birmingham to win the British women's welterweight title.

In September 2026 the Board announced that it would introduce a light cruiserweight division on 1 January 2027. The division would have a limit of 187 lb for British, English, Celtic and area titles.

=== Lonsdale Belt ===
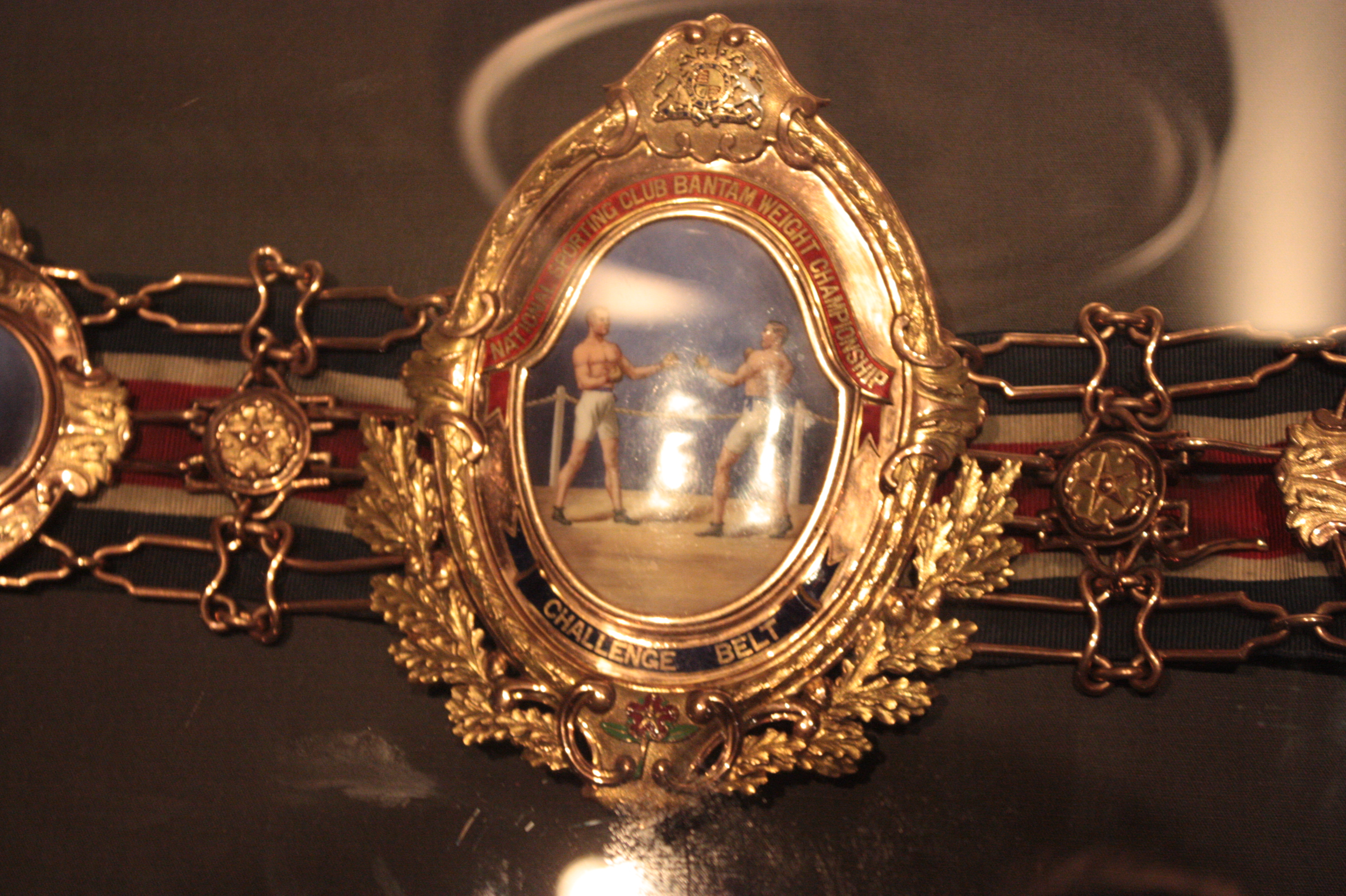
A Lonsdale Belt on display

The Board awards a Lonsdale Belt for each British championship. In 1987, it limited boxers to one outright belt per weight division. From 1 September 1999, a boxer needed four British title wins in the same division, up from three, to keep the belt. At least one of the wins had to be a mandatory defence.

Both rules remain in the Board's 2026 regulations. The Board may also award the belt outright if a champion is not called on to defend the title for three years after winning it.

In 2013, the Board introduced the Lonsdale Badge for boxers to wear on their shorts after winning the belt outright.

== Scoring ==
Under the Board's rules, the referee scores most bouts. Three judges score British and Commonwealth championship bouts and any other bouts designated by the Board's stewards. A supervisor totals the judges' scores.

== See also ==
- Lists of British boxing champions
- Commonwealth Boxing Council
- Amateur Boxing Association of England
- List of British world boxing champions
