= Watson v British Boxing Board of Control =

2000 Court of Appeal of England and Wales case

- Court: Court of Appeal of England and Wales
- Full case name: Michael Alexander Watson v British Boxing Board of Control Ltd & World Boxing Organisation Inc
- Decided: 19 December 2000
- Citation: [2001] QB 1134, [2000] EWCA Civ 2116
- Transcript: transcript at BAILII

Case history
- Prior action: High Court of Justice

Court membership
- Judges sitting: Phillips MR; May LJ; Laws LJ

Case opinions
- Phillips MR

Keywords
- trespass to the person, duty of care, negligence

Watson v British Boxing Board of Control [2000] EWCA Civ 2116 was a case of the Court of Appeal of England and Wales that established an exception to the defence of consent to trespass to the person and an extension of the duty of care expected in cases of negligence. Michael Watson was injured in a boxing match supervised by the British Boxing Board of Control (BBBofC or BBBC), which was expected to provide medical care. This care was insufficient, and as such Watson was in a coma for 40 days, and spent 6 years in a wheelchair. After recovering consciousness, he sued the BBBC in negligence, and was awarded approximately £1 million by the High Court of Justice, who determined that the relationship between the BBBC and Watson was sufficient to create a duty of care. This decision was upheld by the Court of Appeal of England and Wales, who noted that the BBBC had a duty not only to ensure that injuries did not occur, but that injuries were properly treated.

== Facts ==
Michael Watson was a boxer who, on 21 September 1991, fought Chris Eubank under the supervision of the British Boxing Board of Control (BBBC), the British professional boxing governing body. The BBBC had a series of rules on the medical coverage needed for boxing matches, which required two doctors to be present at all times. During the match Watson was knocked out by Eubank, and it was 7 minutes before doctors attended him; eventually 3 doctors and an ambulance were needed. He was given no oxygen, and first sent to a hospital which lacked a neurosurgery unit. Watson spent 40 days in a coma and 6 years in a wheelchair, with doctors initially predicting that he would never walk again. After recovering consciousness, he sued the BBBC, arguing that because they laid down the rules governing professional boxing that ensured his safety, they owed him a duty of care and should have ensured that he was properly and immediately treated.

== Judgment ==
=== High Court ===
The case first went to the High Court of Justice, where Kennedy, J, gave his judgment on 24 September 1999, awarding Watson around £1 million in damages. Kennedy held that there was a "sufficient nexus" between Watson and the BBBC to create a duty of care, and that Watson's consent to the fight (which would normally be considered a defence of volenti non fit injuria) was not a consent to the inadequate safety measures.

=== Court of Appeal ===
The case was then appealed to the Court of Appeal of England and Wales, where a 3-judge panel consisting of Lord Phillips MR, May LJ and Laws LJ delivered their judgment on 19 December 2000. In an opinion read by Phillips MR, the court upheld Kennedy's decision, noting that it "broke new ground".

Lord Phillips MR noted that the BBBC had taken control of medically supervising the sport, and that the duty of care was not just to avoid injuries, but "to ensure that injuries already sustained are properly treated". This was an extension to the previous duty of care under negligence, and also serves as an exception to the rule under trespass to the person that a defendant will not be liable for personal harm caused in sporting matches which the claimant consents to.

== Significance ==
Paying the compensation granted to Watson, which was eventually reduced to £400,000, led to the BBBC selling their London headquarters and moving to Wales.

== See also ==
- English tort law

== Bibliography ==
- Bermingham, Vera; Carol Brennan (2008). Tort Law. Oxford University Press. ISBN 978-0-19-922798-3.
- Block, Neil (2001). "Watson v British Boxing Board of Control Ltd [2001] Q.B. 1134 (CA (Civ Div))". International Sports Law Review. Sweet & Maxwell. ISSN 1467-6680.
- George, James (2002). "Watson v British Boxing Board of Control: Negligent Rule-Making in the Court of Appeal". Modern Law Review. 65 (1). Blackwell Publishing: 106–119. doi:10.1111/1468-2230.00370. ISSN 0026-7961.
