= Media Defence =

- Established: 2008 (18 years ago)
- Types: non-governmental organization
- Headquarters: London
- Country: United Kingdom

Media Defence (or Media Legal Defence Initiative) is a non-governmental organization established in 2008 to provide legal assistance to journalists, citizen journalists and independent media institutions. It supports training in media law and promotes the exchange of information, litigation tools and strategies for lawyers working on media freedom cases. It is based in London, England and has a global network of media lawyers and media freedom activists with whom it works on cases and projects.

== History ==
The Media Defence was established as a not-for-profit company in June 2008 and registered as an independent charitable organization in 2009. It originated after the criminal defamation trial in 2004 of Indonesian newspaperman Bambang Harymurti, editor of Tempo magazine (Indonesia). The group that assisted the defence of Harymurti saw the need for an independent non-governmental organization that could provide legal support to journalists and media outlets worldwide to defend their legal rights. Media Defence also works to improve the capacity of lawyers in Southeast Asia and elsewhere to defend media freedom of expression.

Since its foundation, Media Defence has provided assistance through grants for legal fees, supporting nongovernmental organizations that provide legal services to the media. Grants have also been awarded to enable the training and networking of media lawyers in Thailand, Malaysia, Singapore, Indonesia, Cambodia, and the Philippines.

Gugulethu Moyo was the executive director of Media Defence from June 2009 until July 2011, while Peter Noorlander was the Chief Executive between April 2011 and April 2016. Lucy Freeman succeeded him as Chief Executive from 2016 to 2021. Currently, Alinda Vermeer is the organization's substantive CEO, who joined in 2014.

== Cases supported ==
Media Defence has supported the legal defence of journalists, citizen journalists and independent media organisations, such as Lohé Issa Konaté v. Burkina Faso, the first free speech case before the African Court of Human and Peoples' Rights which ruled that the imprisonment for defamation of a journalist from Burkina Faso violated his rights. Media Defence's Legal Director, Nani Jansen, represented Lohé Issa Konaté v. Burkina Faso before the Court alongside John Jones QC and Steven Finizio.

Media Defence has been invited to intervene as amicus curiae in the European Court of Human Rights in the cases of Von Hannover v. Germany (2) (application no. 40660/08), adjudicated in February, 2012, on the balance between privacy and freedom of expression, MGN Trinity Mirror v. UK, in which it argued that the high cost of defending libel cases violates the right to freedom of expression, and Pauliukas v. Lithuania in 2009. The European Court issued a ruling agreeing with Media Defence's submissions in the MGN case. Along with others, Media Defence also intervened in Max Mosley's application to the European Court of Human Rights, as to whether there should be advance notice given to targets in privacy cases, and Sanoma v Netherlands a case addressing the protection of journalistic sources. In both cases, its arguments were accepted by the Court. It has interventions pending in a case challenging so-called "false news" laws, prohibiting the publication of anything the authorities deem to be incorrect; and in a case concerning the abuse of criminal libel laws.

Media Defence has also been at the forefront of a campaign at the Council of Europe to address the impact that counter-terrorism laws are having on media freedom. The council's campaign has resulted in a pledge by States to review these laws.

With the IBA and others, Media Defence supports the development of the media lawyers network in Southeast Asia.

== Organization and funding ==
Media Defence is registered as a charity organization in the United Kingdom.

== Awards ==
In March 2015, Media Defence was awarded Columbia University's inaugural Global Freedom of Expression Prize.
