= McKennitt v Ash =

English legal case on privacy

McKennitt v Ash is an English legal case in which Loreena McKennitt, a Canadian world music singer, sued in England to prevent publication of extracts of a book written by a former friend on the grounds of privacy. McKennitt won the case.

In 2005, McKennitt was involved in an acrimonious court case in the United Kingdom when her former friend and employee, Niema Ash, intended to publish a book, Travels with Loreena McKennitt: My Life as a Friend, which contained intimate details of their friendship. McKennitt argued that much of the book contained confidential personal information, which Ash had no right to publish. The English courts found that there had indeed been a breach of confidence and a misuse of McKennitt's private information. The decision "created new precedents for privacy law in the U.K." The Court of Appeal affirmed the lower court's decision in 2006, and that affirmation was reaffirmed when the House of Lords declined to hear what would have been a final appeal.

== See also ==
- Privacy in English law
