= Prince Albert v Strange =

- Court: High Court of Chancery
- Decided: 1849

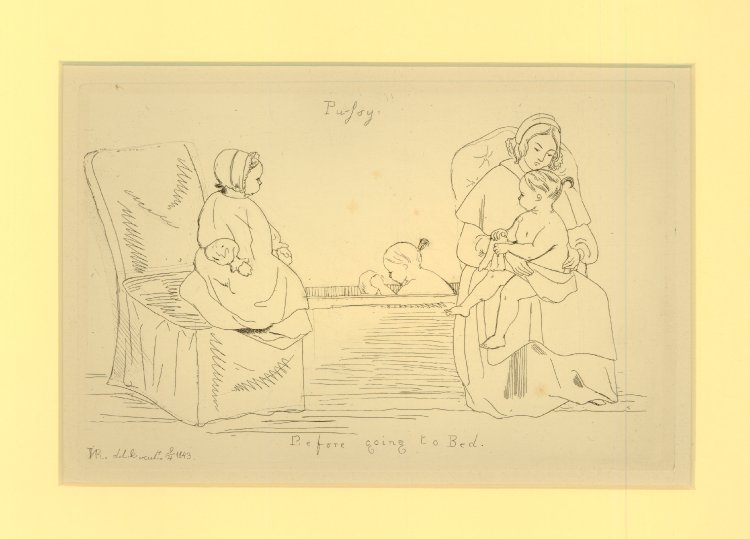
"Before Going to Bed" - three views of Princess Vicky at the age of two, drawn and etched by Queen Victoria in 1843

Prince Albert v Strange was a court decision made by the High Court of Chancery in 1849, and began the development of confidence law in England. The court awarded Prince Albert an injunction, restraining Strange from publishing a catalogue describing Prince Albert's etchings. Lord Cottenham LC noted that "this case by no means depends solely upon the question of property; for a breach of trust, confidence, or contract, would of itself entitle the plaintiff to an injunction".

== Summary ==
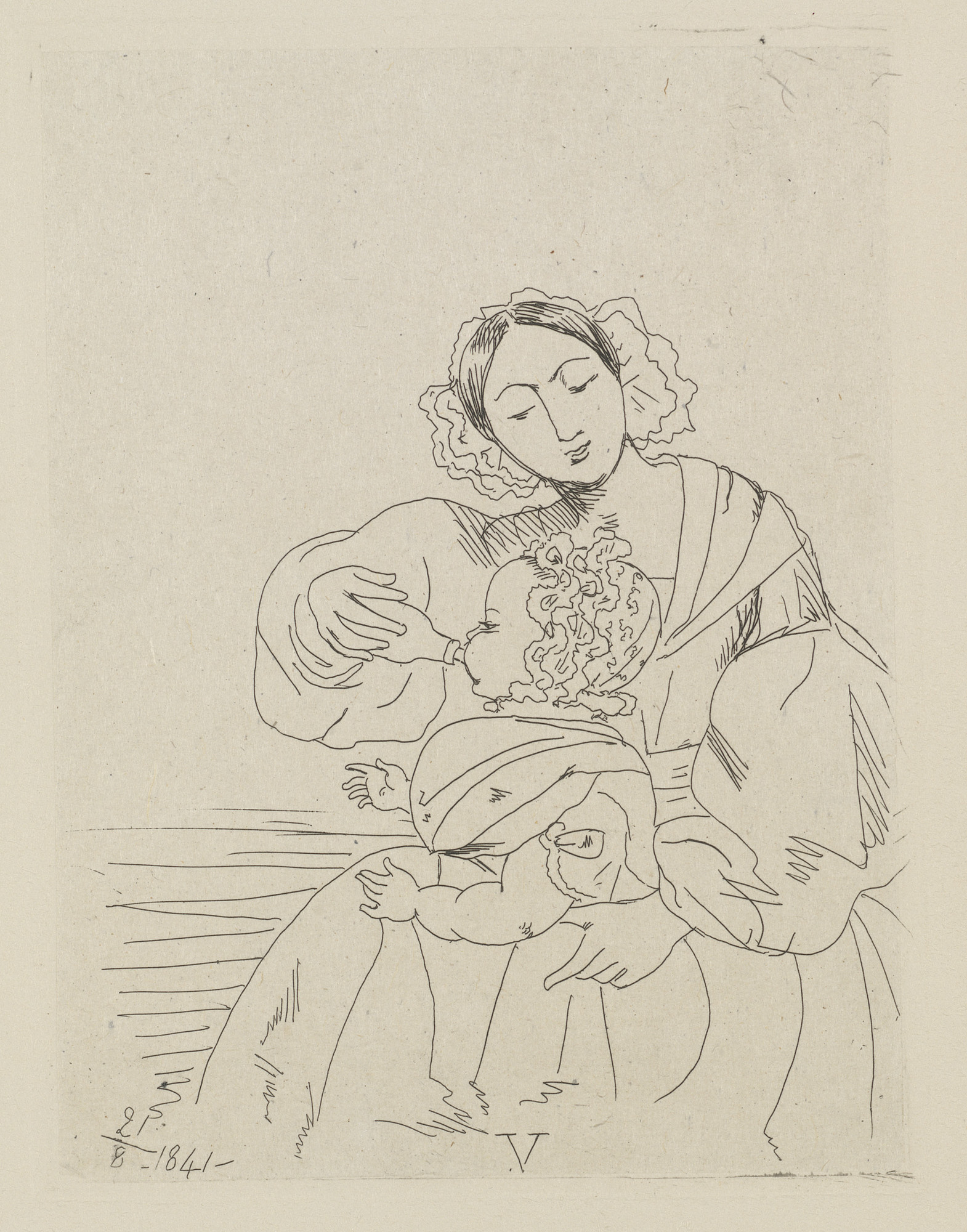
An etching by Queen Victoria of Princess Vicky being fed by her nurse

Both Queen Victoria and Prince Albert created a number of etchings in the 1840s as a hobby. The copper plates for these were entrusted to a printer in Windsor called John Brown to create copies that the couple showed to friends or gave away. The plates and the good copies were returned by Brown. However, a number of extra copies had been run off by an employee of Brown's, called Middleton. Middleton sold a set of 63 different prints for the sum of £5 to Jasper Tomsett Judge, a writer who in 1848 had published a book Sketches of Her Majesty's Household, investigating the Queen's finances, expenditures, and patronage. Judge proposed to make a public exhibition of the etchings, and drew up a catalogue for it, 50 copies of which were printed by his publisher, William Strange; with two copies sent to Windsor Castle, for the sight of the Queen and the Prince.

Prince Albert filed suit for the surrender of the etchings, for the prohibition of the exhibition, and for prevention of publication of the etchings. His plea was granted.

== Extant copies of the etchings ==
The Royal Collection holds six volumes of etchings by the Queen and the Prince Consort, plus further copies. In all sixty-two plates were made by the Queen, and twenty-five by the Prince. An almost complete set of the prints was given to the British Museum by King George V in 1926. There is also a volume with 74 of the etchings in the collections of Harewood House. This volume had been owned by Prince Albert's private secretary George Anson, and was given by a descendant of his to Princess Mary on the occasion of her marriage to the 6th Earl of Harewood in 1922. A volume of 80 etchings that the Queen presented to Prince Albert's biographer Sir Theodore Martin in 1869 came up for auction in Cirencester in 2016, but failed to make a reserve price of £24,000.

No copy is known to have survived of Mr Strange's catalogue.

== See also ==
- Privacy in English law
