= Jus tertii =

Jus tertii (English: rights of a third party/ stranger) is a term for the legal argument by which a person can defend a claim made against them by invoking the rights of a stranger to the dispute. The defence asserts that the rights of the stranger are superior to those of the claimant; in other words the defence is that the claimant has insufficient right to make the claim he does, and that the stranger is the one to whom the defendant is really answerable.

Generally the argument is an attempt by the defendant to justify their own entitlement to possession by showing that legal title belongs to a person other than the person with actual possession. By showing legitimate title belongs to a third party (tertius), jus tertii arguments imply that the present possessor’s interest is illegitimate or that the present possessor is a thief.

In English law the argument is also sometimes used to defend against a claim by a person with possession of a thing, on the grounds that the claimant is not the true owner. (See the Torts (Interference with Goods) Act 1977 s 8(1).). This is unusual, and in most cases the defence of jus tertii is considered ineffective: a claimant with possession is, as regards a wrongdoer, entitled to the full rights of an owner; and this is so even if, as regards the stranger, his title is less than that (The Winkfield [1902] P 42).

Under United States law, jus tertii arguments are generally insufficient to support actions for replevin because they fail to show that possession is more legitimate in the third party than in the present possessor. However, a bailee or other legal agent of the owner may successfully assert the argument.

The principle is sometimes used to allow one person to enforce or test the constitutional rights of another, which usually can't be done due to lack of standing. This is only possible for fundamental rights, where there is a close connection between the person whose rights are violated and the person wishing to enforce them, and the constitutional right being enforced is a fundamental right. See, e.g., Singleton v. Wulff.

== Hypothetical example ==
Art brings an action for replevin against Burt, seeking to recover a bicycle. In support for the action, Art presents evidence that Cathy is in fact the true owner of the bicycle in question, not Burt. A US court would reject Art’s jus tertii argument for replevin because he has failed to show that he has a more legitimate interest in the bike than Burt.

== Case law example ==
In Gissel v. State, Gissel unlawfully harvested wild rice growing on land jointly owned by the state of Idaho and the National Forest Service. An Idaho Court convicted Gissel of trespass, and Idaho officials seized and sold the rice at auction. Because Idaho had only one half interest in the land, Gissel challenged the state’s authority to seize, sell, and keep the profits from all of the rice. The Idaho Supreme Court held that Gissel was entitled to half of the profits because Idaho did not effectively make the jus tertii argument on behalf of the federal government, “the Gissels, though trespassers and without legal title, which title rests with the Forest Service, still by mere possession have greater rights superior to that of the state.”

The jus tertii principle also extends to criminal law. For example, in Anic, Stylianou & Suleyman v R, three men were charged with larceny (among other things) after breaking into a house to steal drugs. The men argued that they should not be charged with stealing something which is unlawfully possessed. The court rejected this argument on the basis that larceny has always been an offence against possession. The common law has never recognised an absolute right of ownership. The owner is merely the person who has the best right to possession. Therefore, a person can be guilty of larceny by stealing from someone who had stolen the thing from someone else. The right to possess drugs is limited by statute but the occupant of the house had a better right to possession than the defendants.
