= Bernstein of Leigh v Skyviews & General Ltd =

1978 case in English law

- Court: High Court of Justice
- Citation: [1978] QB 479

Keywords
- Trespass

Bernstein of Leigh v Skyviews & General Ltd [1978] QB 479 is a case in English law in which a plaintiff attempted to sue for trespass when aerial photographs were taken of his property. The case established that a property owner does not have unqualified rights over the airspace above their land.

== Facts ==
On 3 August 1974 the defendants took an aerial photograph of the plaintiff's house. The plaintiff alleged that in taking the aerial photo, the defendants had trespassed in the plaintiff's airspace. The defendants admitted taking the photo but claimed that they had taken it whilst flying over an adjoining property. The defendants also argued that if they had flown over the plaintiff's land, then they had the plaintiff's implied permission.

== Judgment ==
Griffiths J found as a fact that the plane had at some point flown over the plaintiff's land, even if the photograph might have been taken whilst over neighbouring land, and the defendants did not have the plaintiff's implied permission. He further stated: "I can find no support in authority for the view that a landowner's rights in the air space above his property extend to an unlimited height." The case established that the rights of a land owner over his land extend only to a height necessary for the ordinary use and enjoyment of his land.

Ordinary commercial and private flights would, in any event, have been protected from actions in trespass by section 40(1) of the Civil Aviation Act 1949 (now Civil Aviation Act 1982, section 76(1)). The case further established that the Act covered flying for the purposes of taking photographs, and was not restricted to flights for the purpose of travelling.

== See also ==
- Cuius est solum eius est usque ad coelum et ad inferos
- Privacy in English law
