= Breach of confidence in English law =

Equitable doctrine in English law

Breach of confidence in English law is an equitable doctrine that allows a person to claim a remedy when their confidence has been breached. A duty of confidence arises when confidential information comes to the knowledge of a person in circumstances in which it would be unfair if it were disclosed to others. Breach of confidence gives rise to a civil claim. The Human Rights Act 1998 has developed the law on breach of confidence so that it now applies to private bodies as well as public ones.

== Elements ==
There are several elements required to prove a breach of confidence, and these are not set out in specific legislation. Typically, to rely on a claim of breach of confidence, reference must be made to the elements established in common law. In Coco v A N Clark (Engineers) Ltd a breach of confidence claim was made regarding technical information which held significant commercial value.

In my judgment, three elements are normally required if, apart from contract, a case of breach of confidence is to succeed. First, the information itself, in the words of Lord Greene, M.R. in the Saltman case on page 215, must "have the necessary quality of confidence about it". Secondly, that information must have been imparted in circumstances importing an obligation of confidence. Thirdly, there must be an unauthorised use of that information to the detriment of the party communicating it.

Here, the three elements required to establish such a claim were established:

=== The information is confidential ===
The information at hand must have a clearly identifiable nature of confidentiality. Confidential information typically has some sort of value, be it financial or otherwise, the information is somehow of significance that it warrants protection. Secrecy can also indicate confidentiality. However, a document or conversation signalled or marked as one that is secret or confidential may not necessarily impart confidentiality.

==== Accessibility ====
The information must be sufficiently secret, not common or public knowledge. A number of considerations have been regarded by courts as relevant to whether information is public knowledge, and in determining confidentiality accessibility is seen as an important factor. In the High Court of Australia case of ABC v Lenah (Lenah), the operator of a Tasmanian abattoir operator had obtained an injunction to prevent the Australian Broadcasting Corporation (ABC) from publishing footage taken on private property, with the ABC appealing this injunction . The abattoir operator argued in part that the film taken on his private property of slaughtering methods was private and confidential, hence subject to a breach of confidentiality claim. Justice Kirby alone accepted submissions that the publication of information obtained through trespass was restrainable as a result of breaching confidential information. However, this was a dissenting argument, with the Court majority (Justice Gummow, Justice Hayne, Justice Gaudron) finding that an act is not private merely because it takes place on private property, and that the act itself must be private and confidential in nature. Lenah demonstrated that where someone could stumble upon the confidential information or it is available, confidentiality is unlikely to be imported. The abattoir had been inspected regularly, and with the ease of public access to the private property, this meant the information was generally accessibly and in the public domain.

==== Circle of confidence ====
A duty of confidentiality can be imposed on those told confidential information, and a select group of people being informed of information does not vitiate confidentiality. In contrast to Lenah, Jane Doe v ABC (Doe) found information obtained by the broadcaster to be confidential. A woman had been sexually assaulted, with the broadcaster obtaining knowledge of this information from the remarks of the trial judge. Legislation banned publishing of details likely to 'identify a person against whom a sexual offence is alleged to have been committed. The effect of such legislation gave the information a private character. Justice Hample found that the nature of the information, the circumstances whereby the broadcaster became aware of this information, and the effect of the legislation each created an obligation of confidence but that in combination all three created "powerful circumstances importing an obligation of confidence". So, a breach of confidence was established. English courts had been establishing a need for reform some years prior to Lenah. In Campbell v MGN Ltd, the House of Lords refuted the previous requisite for a pre-existing arrangement of trust and confidence, instead holding an obligation arises whenever a person receives information they know or ought reasonably to have known is confidential. The Court in Lenah applied these English developments, finding confidence in this case was not impacted merely because the woman at hand had informed friends and family she had been sexually assaulted. In such circumstances, a duty of confidentiality had been imposed, and disclosure in such a manner did not vitiate the confidentiality of information allowing others to breach such confidentiality.

==== Value ====
The breach of confidence doctrine does not protect trivial information. The information will warrant the protection by courts through equity only if such courts can objectively assess the information as valuable. Typically, information that holds commercial value will easily satisfy this element, as equity seeks to protect secrets that arise from the 'ingenuity of the human brain', and most often such secrets will hold some sort of commercial value.

=== The information was shared in a confidential manner ===
It is not sufficient for the information to be confidential: it must also have been communicated to its recipient in circumstances that can be properly described as confidential. In Mense v Milenkovic, McInerney J said:

If the circumstances are such that any reasonable man standing in the shoes of the recipient of the information would have realised that upon reasonable grounds the information was being given to him in confidence, then this should suffice to impose upon him the equitable obligation of confidence.

So, the circumstances in which the information was shared can aid in determining the existence and scope of any obligation of confidence. Specifically, what the recipient knew and also what they ought to have known in the circumstances is relevant.

=== The information was used to detriment of its owner ===
This arm has two parts, relating to information being "used" and relating to the detrimental impact of its use.

In Vestergaard Frandsen A/S (now called mvf3 Apps) and others (Appellants) v Bestnet Europe Limited and others (Respondents) [2013] UKSC 31, the Supreme Court ruling given by Lord Neuberger observed that "an action for breach of confidence is based ultimately on conscience", i.e. the conscience of the person who has the confidential information. For an action to succeed, this person must have agreed, or know, that [the information] is confidential, or "be party to some action which [they] know involves the misuse of confidential information".

== History ==
The modern English law of confidence stems from the judgment of the Lord Chancellor, Lord Cottenham, in which he restrained the defendant from publishing a catalogue of private etchings made by Queen Victoria and Prince Albert (see Prince Albert v Strange).

However, the jurisprudential basis of confidentiality remained largely unexamined until the case of Saltman Engineering Co. Ltd. v Campbell Engineering Co. Ltd., in which the Court of Appeal upheld the existence of an equitable doctrine of confidence, independent of contract.

In Attorney-General v Observer Ltd (1990) – the Spycatcher case – Lord Goff of Chieveley identified three limitations to the doctrine:

To this broad general principle, there are three limiting principles to which I wish to refer. The first limiting principle (which is rather an expression of the scope of the duty) ... is that the principle of confidentiality only applies to information to the extent that it is confidential ... once it has entered what is usually called the public domain ... then, as a general rule, the principle of confidentiality can have no application to it ... The second limiting principle is that the duty of confidence applies neither to useless information, nor to trivia ... The third limiting principle is of far greater importance. It is that, although the basis of the law's protection of confidence is that there is a public interest that confidences should be preserved and protected by the law, nevertheless that public interest may be outweighed by some other countervailing public interest which favours disclosure.

=== Contemporary application ===
Article 8 of the European Convention on Human Rights was incorporated into English domestic law by the Human Rights Act 1998. Article 8 provides that everyone has the right to respect for his private and family life, his home and his correspondence. In Campbell v MGN Ltd, the House of Lords held that the Daily Mirror had breached Naomi Campbell’s confidentiality rights by publishing reports and pictures of her attendance at Narcotics Anonymous meetings.

Although the court divided 3–2 as to the result of the appeal and adopted slightly different formulations of the applicable principles, there was broad agreement that, in confidentiality cases involving issues of privacy, the focus shifted from the nature of the relationship between claimant and defendant to (a) an examination of the nature of the information itself and (b) a balancing exercise between the claimant's rights under Article 8 and the defendant's competing rights (for example, under Article 10, to free speech).

== Other cases ==
- Lennon v News Group Newspapers Ltd (1978) FSR 573
- Commonwealth v John Fairfax & Sons [1980] HCA 44, (1980) 147 CLR 39
- Moorgate Tobacco Co Ltd v Philip Morris Ltd (No 2) [1980] HCA 44, (1984) 156 CLR 414, 438
- Smith Kline & French Laboratories (Australia) Ltd v Secretary, Department of Community Services & Health [1991] FCA 150, (1991) 28 FCR 291
- Telstra Corp Ltd v First Netcom Pty Ltd [1997] FCA 860, (1997) 78 ALR 202, 208
- R v Department of Health; Ex parte Source Informatics Ltd [2000] 1 All ER 786
- Attorney General v Observer and Guardian Newspapers Ltd [2011] UKSC 39

== See also ==
- Privacy in English law
