= David Pannick, Baron Pannick =

British lawyer and House of Lords crossbencher

The Right Honourable The Lord Pannick KC
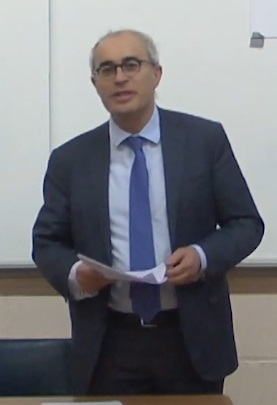
- Pannick in 2020

Member of the House of Lords
- Lord Temporal
- Life peerage 3 November 2008

Personal details
- Born: David Philip Pannick; 7 March 1956 (age 70) Islington, London, England
- Party: None (crossbencher)
- Spouses: Denise Sloam (m. 1978; died 1999) Nathalie Trager-Lewis (m. 2003)
- Children: Six
- Education: Bancroft's School, University of Oxford (BA, BCL)
- Occupation: Barrister; Peer
- Awards: Hamlyn Lectures (2021)
- Website: www.blackstonechambers.com/barristers/lord-pannick-kc

David Philip Pannick, Baron Pannick, KC (born 7 March 1956) is a British barrister at Blackstone Chambers and a crossbencher in the House of Lords. He practises primarily in public law and human rights and has argued high profile cases before the Supreme Court of the United Kingdom, the Appellate Committee of the House of Lords, the European Court of Justice, and the European Court of Human Rights.

== Early life and education ==
David Philip Pannick was born on 7 March 1956 in Islington, London, England, to Maurice and Rita Pannick. He is Jewish. He won a scholarship to study at Bancroft's School, a private school in Woodford Green, London. He studied law at the University of Oxford where he was an undergraduate student of Hertford College, Oxford. He graduated with a Bachelor of Arts (BA) degree and subsequently a Bachelor of Civil Law (BCL) degree.

== Career ==
Pannick was called to the Bar at Gray's Inn in 1979, and was one of the panel of Junior Counsel to the Crown (Common Law) from 1988 to 1992, when he was appointed Queen's Counsel, as the title was known during the reign of Elizabeth II. He was also appointed a recorder on the South Eastern Circuit in 1995, and a deputy High Court judge in 1998. He stopped sitting as a judge in 2005.

Pannick has appeared in the courts of Hong Kong, Brunei, Gibraltar, Trinidad, the British Virgin Islands, Bermuda and the Cayman Islands. He appeared in 100 cases before the Appellate Committee of the House of Lords before its jurisdiction was transferred to the new Supreme Court in October 2009.

=== As an academic ===
Pannick was elected as an examination fellow of All Souls College, Oxford, in 1978. He became an honorary fellow of Hertford College, Oxford, in September 2004. He has written on legal matters for The Times, and was co-author with Anthony Lester of Human Rights Law and Practice.

=== Peerage ===
On 29 September 2008, the House of Lords Appointments Commission announced that Pannick had been nominated for a life peerage as a crossbencher. His title is recorded in The London Gazette as Baron Pannick, of Radlett in the county of Hertfordshire, dated 3 November 2008.

On 31 July 2025, he was a signatory of a letter from 38 House of Lords members opposing the UK's plan to recognise a State of Palestine: the peers said that Palestine "does not meet the international law criteria for recognition of a state, namely, defined territory, a permanent population, an effective government and the capacity to enter into relations with other states."

=== Notable cases ===
In the 1980s, Pannick appeared for The Sunday Times in the Spycatcher case. He acted for the gay servicemen who established in the European Court of Human Rights in 1999 a finding of unlawful dismissal because of their sexual orientation; represented Camelot PLC in the High Court in 2000 and established that the National Lottery Commission had treated it unfairly in rejecting its application to renew its licence to run the National Lottery; acted for the League Against Cruel Sports in defending a challenge to the validity of the Hunting Act 2004; represented a woman who established that she was entitled to be prescribed with the breast cancer drug Herceptin; and was briefed by the Kingdom of Saudi Arabia in its claim to state immunity against allegations of torture.

In 2007, Pannick appeared for BBC director-general Mark Thompson when an attempt was made to prosecute the BBC for blasphemy for broadcasting Jerry Springer: The Opera. In July 2008, he represented the British Olympic Committee in successfully resisting in the High Court the claim by athlete Dwain Chambers about the refusal to select him for the Beijing Olympics because of the earlier finding of doping. Later that year, he represented Debbie Purdy in the Appellate Committee of the Lords (the last judgement given in the House of Lords) to establish the duty of the Director of Public Prosecutions to publish guidelines on prosecuting for assisting a suicide.

Later, Pannick acted for AF, a man subject to a control order, establishing that the Home Secretary had a duty to inform him of the essence of the case against him. He represented The Crown in the Supreme Court in establishing in 2010 that MPs accused of dishonestly claiming expenses were not entitled to the benefit of parliamentary privilege. In January 2011, he represented Max Mosley before the European Court of Human Rights in his claim that the right to privacy obliged the United Kingdom to impose duties on newspapers to give prior notice of a publication invading privacy so the subject could seek an injunction. He appeared for the Jewish Free School (JFS) in the first hearing before the new Supreme Court on 2 October 2009, about the school's admissions policy. In 2011 and 2012, Pannick also represented the Government of Hong Kong in Vallejos v Commissioner of Registration, a case in which a foreign domestic helper sought judicial review to determine whether it was constitutional for the government to deny her the right of abode in the territory.

In October 2016, he co-wrote a legal opinion commissioned by businessman Philip Green to challenge the conclusions of a parliamentary inquiry which criticised Green's conduct over the collapse of retailer British Home Stores.

Also in 2016, Pannick successfully represented Gina Miller in R (Miller) v Secretary of State for Exiting the European Union, an action against the Secretary of State for Exiting the European Union on whether approval by Parliament was required before the Prime Minister could initiate proceedings under Article 50 of the Treaty of the European Union to take the UK out of the European Union.

Pannick successfully led the team working on behalf of Gina Miller in R (on the application of Miller) (Appellant) v The Prime Minister (Respondent), arguing against the legality of the Government's prorogation of Parliament in September 2019. In the ruling on the morning of 24 September 2019, the UK supreme court unanimously judged that the Prime Minister Boris Johnson had given unlawful advice to the Queen.

In November 2020, Pannick appeared on behalf of Shamima Begum in the Supreme Court in Begum v Home Secretary, judicial review proceedings brought against the then Home Secretary Sajid Javid's decision not to allow her to return to Britain for legal proceedings regarding the removal of her British citizenship.

In March 2023, Pannick advised former Prime Minister Boris Johnson in his assessment by the House of Commons Privileges Committee of whether he knowingly misled the House in relation to his statements around the Partygate scandal.

Pannick has a notable association with Manchester City, representing them as counsel as far back as 2005 as part of a compensation dispute with former manager Joe Royle, as well as further cases against UEFA and the Premier League.

=== Small house policy ===
Pannick represented the Heung Yee Kuk village organisation in Hong Kong, in a court case to defend the small house policy. The controversial policy allows male villagers, but not female villagers, the right to build their own house on government land in the New Territories. Pannick challenged Martin Lee, the "Father of Democracy", who represented the plaintiffs. Lee said that "Hong Kong has been waiting for so many years for someone to challenge this policy." However, Pannick argued that the plaintiff, Kwok Cheuk-kin, was "simply a busybody."

=== Hamlyn lectures ===
In 2021, he delivered the Hamlyn Lectures on the subject of advocacy.

=== Publications ===
Pannick's publications include:

- Judicial Review of the Death Penalty
- Sex Discrimination Law
- Judges
- Advocates
- Human Rights Law and Practice
- I Have to Move My Car: Tales of Unpersuasive Advocates and Injudicious Judges

== Personal life ==
Pannick married Denise Sloam in 1978. The couple had two sons and one daughter. Denise died of cancer in 1999. Pannick married lawyer Nathalie Trager-Lewis in 2003. The couple have two daughters and a son. His entry in Who's Who lists his recreations as "travel, supporting Arsenal, musicals".

Pannick is also a patron for the United Kingdom Lawyers for Israel lobbyist group, an association of lawyers that support pro-Israel legal causes.

Orders of precedence in the United Kingdom
| Preceded by The Lord Carter of Barnes | Gentlemen; Baron Pannick | Followed by The Lord Davies of Abersoch |
