= AMP v Persons Unknown =

- Court: Technology and Construction Court
- Decided: 20 December 2011 (published 10 January 2012)
- Citation: [2011] EWHC 3454 (TCC)

Court membership
- Judge sitting: The Hon. Mr. Justice Ramsey

AMP v Persons Unknown is a case from the Technology and Construction Court in London. The decision in the case was published on 10 January 2012, and involved a woman who had experienced blackmail and harassment after sexually explicit pictures of her taken on a mobile phone camera were uploaded to BitTorrent file-sharing websites.

== Background ==
While she was at university in June 2008, the woman, who was referred to in the court documents as AMP, discovered that her mobile phone had been lost or stolen. Previously, around August 2007, the camera on the phone had been used to take photographs "of an explicit sexual nature which were taken for the personal use of her boyfriend at the time." Shortly afterwards, she was contacted on Facebook by a person identifying himself as "Nils Henrik-Derimot", who threatened to expose her identity, post the images widely online and tell her friends about the images if she did not add him as a friend on Facebook. The woman deleted the messages and blocked the sender. Additionally, "At about the same time her father's business public relations team were contacted and allegedly threatened and blackmailed about some images but it was not specified that the images were of her".

On 2 November 2008, the images were uploaded to a Swedish website hosting BitTorrent files. This resulted in the link to the BitTorrent files appearing at the top of the list of search engine searches for her name. AMP's solicitors used the Digital Millennium Copyright Act to remove some of the links from U.S. based search engine results.

== 2011 case in the Technology and Construction Court ==
After hearing the case on 8 and 19 December 2011, The Hon. Mr. Justice Ramsey granted the woman involved anonymity, and ruled that the Persons Unknown who were seeding (i.e. uploading) the files in question would be breaking the law, and that the IP Address of a seeder could be traced by a court order. The judge cited Article 8 of the European Convention on Human Rights, which guarantees the "Right to respect for private and family life", and the Protection from Harassment Act 1997 as the basis of his decision.

== Reactions ==
AMP v Persons Unknown was described by The Independent as "a landmark". The case was believed to be the first time that a court had granted an injunction prohibiting the downloading of specific files shared via BitTorrent technology. Andrew Murray, Professor of Law at the London School of Economics who acted as an expert witness, wrote that the case "provides a new approach to the regulation of online content for individuals" and could show that "content on BitTorrent may just be regulatable after all". Conservative MP Louise Mensch said of AMP "She has courageously struck a blow for women and privacy".

== See also ==
- Privacy in English law
