= Kaye v Robertson =

Kaye v Robertson [1991] FSR 62 is a case in English law, expressing the view that there is no right to privacy in English common law.

== Facts ==
The case involved actor Gorden Kaye, who had suffered serious head injuries when a plank smashed through his car windscreen in the Burns' Day storm of January 1990. While he was recovering from brain surgery, two journalists from the Sunday Sport posed as doctors and took photographs of him in his room at the hospital. Kaye attempted to obtain an order to restrain publication of the photographs.

== Judgment ==
A friend of Kaye had been granted an interlocutory injunction preventing the editor (Anthony Robertson) and the Sunday Sport from using the material; they appealed.

Lord Justice Glidewell said, "It is well known that in English law there is no right to privacy, and accordingly there is no right of action for breach of a person's privacy. The facts of the present case are a graphic illustration of the desirability of Parliament considering whether and in what circumstances statutory provision can be made to protect the privacy of individuals."

In the absence of the right to privacy, Kaye's solicitors Wright Webb Syrett based their claim on libel, malicious falsehood, trespass to the person and passing off. The Court of Appeal ruled that none of these torts was applicable except malicious falsehood, and on this basis, the only remedy available was that the newspaper was prohibited from stating any inference that Kaye had consented to the story.

== See also ==
- Privacy in English law
- Wainwright v Home Office
