= Vivian Ramsey =

Sir Vivian Arthur Ramsey
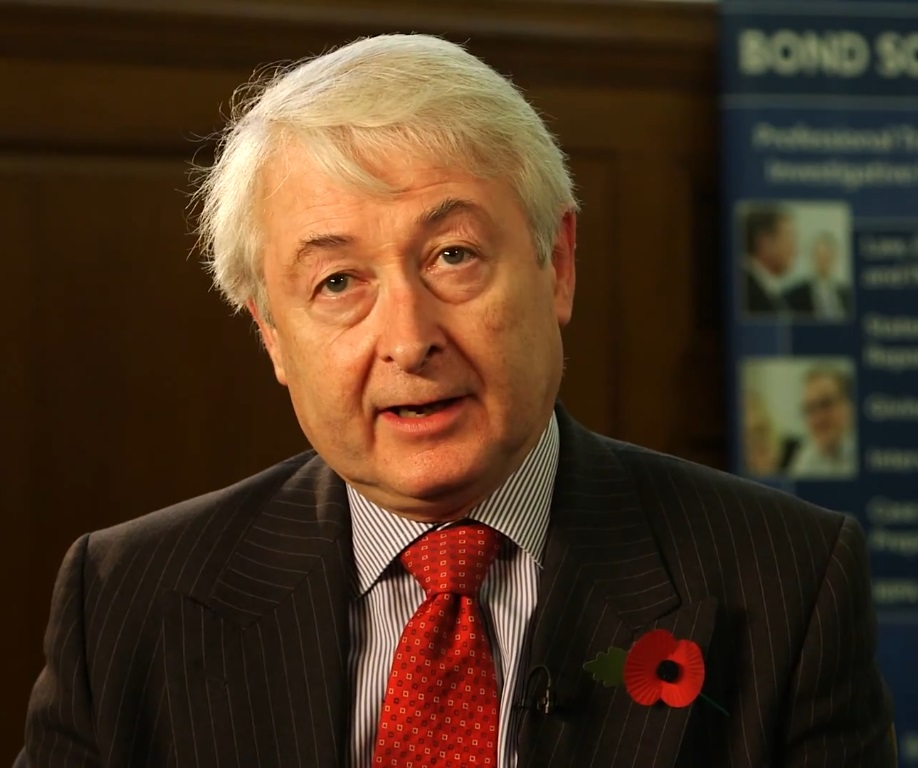
- Born: 24 May 1950 (age 75)

Sir Vivian Arthur Ramsey FREng (born 24 May 1950), is a former judge of the High Court of England and Wales and former civil engineer.

He is an international judge of the Singapore International Commercial Court.

== Education and early career ==
He was educated at Abingdon School.

== Legal career ==
As a specialist in construction law, Sir Vivian was assigned to the Technology and Construction Court and was subsequently made Judge in charge of the Court in 2007. He was appointed a Fellow of the Royal Academy of Engineering in 2013.

== Other work ==
He was on the governing body of Abingdon School from 2009 to 2016.

== See also ==
- AMP v. Persons Unknown
- List of Old Abingdonians
