= Attorney-General v Observer Ltd =

UK House of Lords decision on breach of confidentiality in tort law

Attorney General v Observer Ltd
- Court: House of Lords
- Full case name: Attorney General v Observer Ltd; Attorney General v Times Newspapers Ltd (No.2); Attorney General v Guardian Newspapers Ltd (No.2)
- Decided: 13 October 1988
- Transcript: Full text of the judgment

Attorney General v Observer Ltd [1990] is an English tort law case on breach of confidentiality. It also raised questions of the interests of public policy and freedom of expression, under the European Convention on Human Rights, because it involved a spy's publication of secret information.

== Facts ==
Peter Wright worked for MI5. After retiring he wrote a book called Spycatcher, describing his work. This was in breach of the Official Secrets Act 1911. It was published in Australia and the US. The Observer and The Guardian published articles on proceedings in the Australian courts by the UK government to stop the publication. The Attorney General then sought and received an interlocutory injunction restraining publication of information obtained by Wright in June 1986. In July 1987 the Sunday Times published extracts from the book two days before its publication in the US. The Attorney General sought and was given injunctions to restrain further publication. But Scott J discharged them, holding the paper was liable to account for profits resulting from the publication. The Court of Appeal dismissed the Attorney General's appeal, and he appealed again to the House of Lords.

== Judgment ==
Lord Keith of Kinkel, Lord Brightman, Lord Griffiths, Lord Goff of Chieveley and Lord Jauncey of Tullichettle upheld the Attorney General's appeal, finding that the Sunday Times publication was in breach of its duty of confidence. That could arise both in contract and equity. A duty of confidence precludes disclosure to others, and a third party (like a newspaper) with confidential information is similarly bound by a duty if they know it is confidential. This was true unless the confidential information was already known to the general public, or the duty to keep the information secret was outweighed by a countervailing public interest in the information.

The Attorney General had to show that disclosure was contrary to the public interest. Because Spycatcher was already interestingly published worldwide, the injunctions were not necessary. The articles in the Observer and Guardian contained no damaging information, meaning no breach of confidentiality. But the Sunday Times was in breach of its duty of confidence. It was not protected by a defence of prior publication, and the fact that the story was to be published imminently in the US made no difference. It was therefore liable for the profits it made. However no further injunctions were to be granted on this matter.

In the course of the decision, Lord Goff stated the common law principle that "[In England] everybody is free to do anything, subject only to the provisions of the law".
