= Prince of Wales v Associated Newspapers Ltd =

His Royal Highness the Prince of Wales v Associated Newspapers Ltd
- Court: High Court
- Full case name: His Royal Highness the Prince of Wales v Associated Newspapers Limited
- Decided: 13 January 2006
- Citation: [2006] EWHC 11 (Ch)
- Transcript: His Royal Highness the Prince of Wales v. Associated Newspapers Ltd

Court membership
- Judge sitting: David Kitchin

Keywords
- Privacy

His Royal Highness the Prince of Wales v Associated Newspapers Ltd [2006] EWHC 11 (Ch) is an English legal case brought about when The Mail on Sunday published extracts of a dispatch by Charles, Prince of Wales (later Charles III).

The extracts published in November 2005 from the dispatch, titled "The handover of Hong Kong or the Great Chinese Takeaway", were personally embarrassing to the Prince. The dispatch had been written on the flight back from Hong Kong to the United Kingdom from the transfer of sovereignty over Hong Kong to China, and had been handed out to friends. The Prince described the 1997 Hong Kong handover ceremony as an "awful Soviet-style" performance and "ridiculous rigmarole" and the likened Chinese officials to "appalling old waxworks". The extracts were one of eight reports written following overseas tours in the 1990s that were leaked to the newspaper by Sarah Goodall, a former secretary in the prince's household from 1988 to 2000. The journals were written by Charles following foreign visits and over the course of 30 years. They had been shared "in confidence" with between 50 and 75 people.

== Judgment ==
The Prince won the case and gained an injunction in January 2006 which prevented The Mail on Sunday from publishing further extracts from the diary. The High Court ruled in a summary judgment in March 2006 that the newspaper had infringed his copyright and confidentiality. No judgement was made regarding the seven unpublished reports from his journals. An appeal hearing was held in November 2006, but the newspaper's request for a trial was dismissed by the Court of Appeal in December 2006.

== See also ==
- Privacy in English law
