= Privacy in English law =

Protection of personal or private information

Privacy in English law is a rapidly developing area of English law that considers situations where individuals have a legal right to informational privacy - the protection of personal or private information from misuse or unauthorized disclosure. Privacy law is distinct from those laws such as trespass or assault that are designed to protect physical privacy. Such laws are generally considered as part of criminal law or the law of tort. Historically, English common law has recognized no general right or tort of privacy, and offered only limited protection through the doctrine of breach of confidence and a "piecemeal" collection of related legislation on topics like harassment and data protection. The introduction of the Human Rights Act 1998 incorporated into English law the European Convention on Human Rights. Article 8.1 of the ECHR provided an explicit right to respect for a private life. The Convention also requires the judiciary to "have regard" to the Convention in developing the common law.

== Definition ==
The earliest definition of privacy in English law was given by Thomas M. Cooley who defined privacy as "the right to be left alone". In 1972 the Younger Committee, an inquiry into privacy stated that the term could not be defined satisfactorily. Again in 1990 the Calcutt Committee concluded that: "nowhere have we found a wholly satisfactory statutory definition of privacy".

== Common law ==
There is currently a right to privacy in common law. This point was reaffirmed when the House of Lords ruled in Campbell v MGN (a case involving a supermodel who claimed that she had not taken drugs). It has also been stated that the European Convention on Human Rights does not require the development of an independent tort of privacy. In the absence of a common law right to privacy in English law torts such as the equitable doctrine breach of confidence, torts linked to the intentional infliction of harm to the person and public law torts relating to the use of police powers have been used to fill a gap in the law. The judiciary has developed the law in an incremental fashion and have resisted the opportunity to create a new tort.

== Expansion of privacy laws ==
British radio DJ Sara Cox's case against The People newspaper in 2003 was one of the first celebrity privacy cases. The media referred to the case as a "watershed". The disc jockey sued after the newspaper printed nude photographs of her taken while on her honeymoon. However the case was settled out of court and so did not establish a precedent. The decision was seen as discrediting the Press Complaints Commission

The expansion of the doctrine of breach of confidence under the Human Rights Act began with the Douglas v Hello! decision in 2005. Section 6 of the Human Rights Act requires English courts to give effect to the rights in the Convention when developing the common law. There is no need to show a pre-existing relationship of confidence where private information is involved and the courts have recognised that the publication of private material represents a detriment in itself. The Human Rights act has horizontal effect in disputes between private individuals meaning that the Human Rights Act is just as applicable as if one party had been a public body. Breach of confidence now extends to private information (regardless of whether it is confidential) so as to give effect to Article 8 of the European Convention on Human Rights. Before this breach of confidence afforded "umbrella protection" to both personal and non-personal information.

== European Court of Human Rights challenge ==
Following Max Mosley's successful action in 2008 against the News of the World newspaper for publishing details of his private life, he announced that he would challenge English law's implementation of the Article 8 right to privacy guaranteed when the Human Rights Act implemented the European Convention on Human Rights into English law. The European Court of Human Rights (ECHR) was asked to rule on the issue of "prior notification". This would require journalists to approach the subject of any investigation and inform them of the details of any allegations made about them, therefore allowing an injunction to be claimed. The ECHR ruled that domestic law was not in conflict with the convention.

== Debate ==
The increasing protections afforded to the private lives of individuals has sparked debate as to whether English law gives enough weight to freedom of the press and whether intervention by Parliament would be beneficial. The editor of the satirical magazine Private Eye Ian Hislop has argued against the development of English privacy law. He told BBC's Panorama: "You don't have to prove it [an allegation] isn't true, you just have to prove that it's private by your definition. And in some of the cases the definition of privacy is pretty weak." However, Liberal Democrat politician Mark Oaten has stated that the press were right to expose details of his private life:

"I concluded that however awful it may be, it's better to have a press which can expose MPs' private lives because it means we have a free press… it means we can expose corruption." Max Mosley has argued for the further advancement of the law whereas the editor of the Daily Mail newspaper Paul Dacre has accused Mr Justice Eady, the judge in the Mosley case, of bringing in a privacy law by the back door.

== Key cases ==
- Entick v Carrington
- Prince Albert v Strange
- AMP v Persons Unknown
- A v B plc
- Bernstein of Leigh v Skyviews & General Ltd
- Campbell v Mirror Group Newspapers Ltd
- Douglas v Hello!
- Google Inc v Vidal-Hall & Ors
- Gulati & Ors v MGN Limited
- Halliday v Creation Consumer Finance Ltd (CCF)
- His Royal Highness the Prince of Wales v Associated Newspapers Ltd
- Kaye v Robertson
- Mosley v News Group Newspapers Limited
- Murray v Big Pictures (UK) Ltd
- McKennitt v Ash
- Theakston v Mirror Group Newspapers Ltd
- Wainwright v Home Office
- Wood v Commissioner of Police for the Metropolis

=== European rulings ===
- Von Hannover v. Germany

== See also ==
- 2011 British privacy injunctions controversy
- Breach of confidence
- European Convention on Human Rights
- Press Complaints Commission
