= A v B plc =

English media privacy case

A v B plc (also known as Flitcroft v MGN Ltd) is a 2003 case in English legal case in which a Premiership footballer sought an injunction to prevent a Sunday newspaper from publishing details of his extra-marital affair. The Court of Appeal granted a temporary injunction against publication. The case established that it is not for the press to show a public interest in publication but for the applicant to show why a free press should be overborne.

Lord Woolf remarked in the case "Where an individual is a public figure he is entitled to have his privacy respected. A public figure is entitled to a private life" but a celebrity "should recognise that because of his public position he must expect and accept that his actions will be more closely scrutinised by the media."

== See also ==
- Privacy in English law
