= Contra mundum injunction =

Injunction in the law of England and Wales

A contra mundum injunction is a type of injunction in the law of England and Wales that is enforceable against anyone who knows about it, rather than a named party.

The rule can be traced to the judgment of Lord Eldon in the 1802 case Iveson v Harris, and to the idea that equity only acts against a person and therefore an injunction against the world exceeds the court's equitable powers. However, the UK courts have made exceptions in situations where the action, if unabated, might harm a person by revealing their location. In 2025, the UK Supreme Court confirmed this power in a case involving the identify of individuals who had been involved in end-of-life care of minors.
