= Torts (Interference with Goods) Act 1977 =

Act of the Parliament of the United Kingdom

Torts (Interference with Goods) Act 1977 (Note: Section 17(1).)
- Act of Parliament
- Parliament of the United Kingdom
- Long title: An Act to amend the law concerning conversion and other torts affecting goods.
- Citation: 1977 c. 32
- Territorial extent: England and Wales; Northern Ireland; Scotland (section 15); (Note: Section 16.)

Dates
- Royal assent: 22 July 1977
- Commencement: 1 January 1978 (sections 12 to 16, section 17(1) and (2), and schedule 1); 1 June 1978 (remainder, England and Wales); 1 January 1981 (remainder, Northern Ireland); (Note: Section 17(2). The Torts (Interference with Goods) Act 1977 (Commencement No. 1) Order 1977 (SI 1977/1910), the Torts (Interference with Goods) Act 1977 (Commencement No. 2) Order 1978 (SI 1978/627) and the Torts (Interference with Goods) Act 1977 (Commencement No. 3) Order 1980 (SI 1980/2024).)
Other legislation
Repeals/revokes	Disposal of Uncollected Goods Act 1952
Amended by	County Courts (Northern Ireland) Order 1980; County Courts Act 1984; Consumer Protection Act 1987; Consumer Protection (Northern Ireland) Order 1987; High Court and County Courts Jurisdiction Order 1991; Constitutional Reform Act 2005; Crime and Courts Act 2013

Status: Amended

Text of statute as originally enacted

Revised text of statute as amended

Text of the Torts (Interference with Goods) Act 1977 as in force today (including any amendments) within the United Kingdom, from legislation.gov.uk.

The Torts (Interference with Goods) Act 1977 (c. 32) is an act of the Parliament of the United Kingdom to amend the law in England, Wales and Northern Ireland concerning conversion and other torts affecting goods.

The passage of the law was prompted by the 18th Report of the Law Reform Committee, although the scope of the legislation is considerably reduced from the recommendations of the report. The act abolishes detinue and attempts to simplify the remaining actions in tort.

== Provisions ==
Section 1 of the act defines "wrongful interference with goods" as conversion of goods, trespass to goods, negligence so far as it results in damage to goods or to an interest in goods, and, subject to section 2, any other tort so far as it results in damage to goods or to an interest in goods. Section 2 of the act abolishes detinue, and provides that an action lies in conversion for loss or destruction of goods that a bailee has allowed to happen in breach of his duty to his bailor, which would previously have been detinue.

Section 3 of the act sets out the relief available in proceedings for wrongful interference against a person in possession or control of the goods. The court may order delivery of the goods together with any consequential damages, order delivery with the defendant given the alternative of paying damages by reference to the value of the goods, or award damages. Relief by way of delivery is at the discretion of the court, and the claimant may choose between the others. Section 4 of the act gives the High Court and county courts power to order the delivery up of goods that are or may become the subject matter of proceedings, to the claimant or to a person appointed by the court.

Section 5 of the act provides that payment of damages assessed on the footing that the claimant is compensated for the whole of his interest in the goods, or settlement of such a claim, extinguishes the claimant's title to that interest. Section 6 of the act requires an allowance to be made, in assessing damages, for an improvement to the goods made by a person who acted in the mistaken but honest belief that he had a good title to them, and extends the same principle to a good faith purchaser from the improver.

Section 7 of the act is directed at double liability, where the same wrongdoer could be liable to two or more claimants for the same goods. The relief given must avoid double liability as between the claimants, a claimant who is paid more than he could have recovered must account over to the other person with a right to claim, and a claimant who is unjustly enriched must reimburse the wrongdoer. Section 8 of the act allows a defendant to show that a third party has a better right to the goods than the claimant, and abolishes the rule of law known as jus tertii that prevented this. Section 9 of the act deals with concurrent actions, allowing county court rules to waive limits on jurisdiction so that claims can be brought in the same county court, and allowing the High Court to transfer related county court proceedings to itself.

Section 10 of the act provides that co-ownership is no defence to an action in conversion or trespass to goods where the defendant, without the authority of the other co-owner, destroys the goods or disposes of them in a way that gives good title to the entire property in them. Section 11 of the act provides that contributory negligence is no defence in proceedings founded on conversion or intentional trespass to goods, that receipt of goods by way of pledge is conversion if the delivery of the goods is conversion, and that denial of title is not of itself conversion.

Sections 12 and 13 of the act, with schedule 1, replace the Disposal of Uncollected Goods Act 1952 (15 & 16 Geo. 6 & 1 Eliz. 2. c. 43) with a wider power of sale for a bailee of uncollected goods. The power applies where the bailor is in breach of an obligation to take delivery of the goods, or the bailee cannot trace the bailor, and in certain cases (such as goods accepted for repair, valuation or storage) the bailee may impose an obligation on the bailor to take delivery by giving notice. After giving a notice of intention to sell, or after taking reasonable steps to trace the bailor, the bailee may sell the goods, giving the purchaser a good title as against the bailor but not as against a true owner who was not the bailor, and must account to the bailor for the proceeds less costs of sale. Where an amount is payable by the bailor and fell due before the notice, the period of notice must be at least three months. Section 13 of the act allows the court to authorise a sale, which is then conclusive as against the bailor.

Section 15 of the act repealed the 1952 act, which it preserved for goods bailed before the commencement of the 1977 act. Section 16 of the act extends only section 15 to Scotland and all of the act except section 15 to Northern Ireland, and binds the Crown only so far as the Crown is liable in tort under the Crown Proceedings Act 1947. Schedule 2 to the act contains transitional provisions: the act does not affect actions brought before it came into force, but otherwise applies to earlier acts and omissions.

== See also ==
- Trespass in English law
