= Douglas v Hello! Ltd =

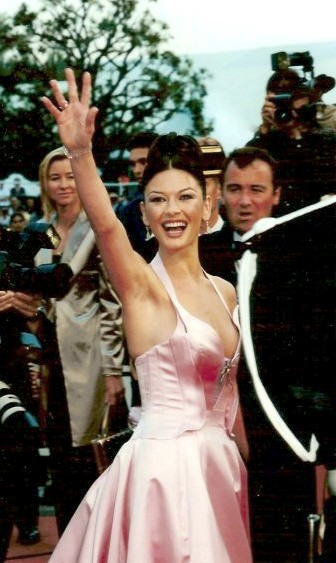
- Court: Court of Appeal
- Full case name: Douglas and others v Hello Limited and others [2005]
- Citations: [2005] EWCA Civ 595, [2006] QB 125

Court membership
- Judges sitting: Lord Phillips MR, Clarke LJ Neuberger LJ

Keywords
- Privacy, economic tort

Douglas v Hello! Ltd [2005] EWCA Civ 595 was a series of cases in which Michael Douglas and Catherine Zeta-Jones challenged the unauthorised use of photographs of their wedding in the English courts. The case resulted in OK! magazine being awarded £1,033,156.

== Facts ==
Michael Douglas and Catherine Zeta-Jones agreed a deal with OK! magazine which would give the company exclusivity over their wedding which took place in 2000 at the Plaza Hotel in New York. According to the deal, the couple were to approve the selection of photographs used by OK! magazine. In order to ensure the exclusivity there was strict security of the event and no guests were allowed to take photographs, the event was closed to the media and guests were told to surrender any equipment which could be used to take photographs. However a freelance photographer Rupert Thorpe, son of the former British politician Jeremy Thorpe, managed to secure access to the wedding and take photographs of the couple. This photographer then sold the images to Hello magazine which had earlier attempted to bid for the photographs. The deal with OK! Magazine was worth £1,000,000.

== Judgments ==
=== Douglas v Hello! (2001) ===
In Douglas v Hello No 1 [2001] 2 WLR 992 the Douglases attempted to gain an injunction to prevent the publication of unauthorized photographs. The Douglases and OK! Magazine claimed for breach of confidence, invasion of privacy, breach of the Data Protection Act 1998 and intention to damage and conspiracy to injure. However the only successful claims were for breach of confidence and for the breach of the Data Protection Act. The High Court granted an injunction but this was reversed by the Court of Appeal. In the judgment Brooke LJ restated the three requirements for there to have been a breach of confidence.

- There has to be an obligation of confidence;
- It arises only on private occasions;
- The prospective claimants have to make clear that no photographic pictures are to be taken.

Brooke LJ ruled that the couple could not expect privacy at a wedding with 250 guests.

=== Douglas v Hello! (2003) ===
In Douglas v Hello! No 2 [2003] EWHC 786 (Ch) OK! Magazine and the Douglases were successful in claiming for breach of confidence against Hello! Ltd. as the company producing Hello!, its Spanish mother Hola! SA, and their proprietor Eduardo Sanchez Junco.

=== Douglas v Hello! (2005) ===
The Judge (Lindsay J) upheld the Douglases claim to confidence. Hello subsequently appealed to the Court of Appeal. The Court of Appeal ruled that the OK! magazine retained confidence in publishing photographs that the Douglases agreed should be published but retained a right of privacy in remaining photographs. The only way in which OK! magazine could recover damages against Hello was through a claim for breach of confidence.

The House of Lords agreed in a 3-2 judgment that the photographs of the wedding were confidential, that there were circumstances of confidence and that publication of the photographs had been to the detriment of OK! magazine. (See OBG Ltd v Allan).

== See also ==
- Privacy in English law
