= Von Hannover v Germany =

2004 European Court of Human Rights case

Von Hannover v Germany [2004] (Application no. 59320/00) was a case decided by the European Court of Human Rights in 2004. The Court ruled that German law breached Article 8 of the European Convention on Human Rights.

Connected cases are Von Hannover v. Germany No. 2 (application no. 40660/08), adjudicated in February, 2012, and Von Hannover v. Germany No. 3 (application no. 8772/10), adjudicated in September 2013.

== Facts ==
Caroline, Princess of Hanover, the eldest daughter of Prince Rainier III of Monaco had for some time attempted to prevent pictures being published of her in the German press.

Princess Caroline took proceedings in the German courts in respect of numerous photographs, achieving only mixed success, since the courts held that she was a "figure of contemporary society par excellence" (in German, "'absolute' Person der Zeitgeschichte") who had to endure a certain level of scrutiny by the press when she was in public.

At the end of the German proceedings, culminating in a judgment of the Federal Constitutional Court on 15 December 1999, she was able to prevent republication of two groups of photographs. The first were photos that were apparently taken secretly when she was with her boyfriend at the time, the French actor Vincent Lindon. They were in a secluded area of a restaurant's courtyard, where they could have expected privacy and to have been able to engage with each other without the inhibitions of being in the public eye. An injunction in respect of these photos was granted by the Federal Court of Justice.

The second group were photos that included her children, who were entitled to a greater degree than their mother of protection from public scrutiny. Here, the Federal Court of Justice did not grant an injunction. However, the Constitutional Court set aside that decision. It remitted reconsideration of these photos to the Federal Court of Justice - subsequently, the publishing company concerned undertook not to republish these photos.

Otherwise, the photos were permitted by the German courts, as they did not include Princess Caroline's children and involved her simply going about her everyday life in public with no particular expectation of seclusion. Further efforts by Princess Caroline in the German courts were unsuccessful in stopping republication of this residual group of photos.

== Judgment of the European Court of Human Rights ==
On 24 June 2004, the European Court of Human Rights unanimously ruled that there was a breach of Article 8 of the European Convention on Human Rights. It accepted that scenes from daily life, involving activities such as engaging in sport, out walking, leaving a restaurant or on holiday were of a purely private nature, in the sense that they did not involve the performance of public.

However, it observed that the purpose of Article 8 was primarily "to ensure the development, without outside interference, of the personality of each individual in his relations with other human beings." Therefore, the Article covered "a zone of interaction of a person with others, even in a public context, which may fall within the scope of 'private life'." Thus, it concluded: "In the present case there is no doubt that the publication by various German magazines of photos of the applicant in her daily life either on her own or with other people falls within the scope of her private life."

The court emphasized its findings in previous cases (which it cited) that Article 8 provided protections extending beyond the problem of direct state interference with privacy: "The Court reiterates that, although the object of Article 8 is essentially that of protecting the individual against arbitrary interference by the public authorities, it does not merely compel the State to abstain from such interference: in addition to this primarily negative undertaking, there may be positive obligations inherent in an effective respect for private or family life. These obligations may involve the adoption of measures designed to secure respect for private life even in the sphere of the relations of individuals between themselves [...]. That also applies to the protection of a person’s picture against abuse by others [...]." This meant that there was a positive obligation on state authorities to protect individuals' private or family life.

In respect of the case before it, the court stated: "The present case does not concern the dissemination of 'ideas', but of images containing very personal or even intimate 'information' about an individual. Furthermore, photos appearing in the tabloid press are often taken in a climate of continual harassment which induces in the person concerned a very strong sense of intrusion into their private life or even of persecution."

In this case, according to the court, the photographs could not be justified on the basis that they somehow contributed to political debate or other debates of general interest to society. The court also referred to a strongly worded resolution on the right of privacy adopted by the Parliamentary Assembly of the Council of Europe on 26 June 1998, prompted in particular by the death of Princess Diana in 1997.

The court was critical of the concept of "a figure of contemporary society 'par excellence'" - and especially the idea that such a person could not protect herself from scrutiny and harassment unless she managed to find "a secluded place out of the public eye" and was able to prove this in court. The court disapproved of the idea that in any other circumstances somebody like Princess Caroline must "accept that she might be photographed at almost any time, systematically, and that the photos are then very widely disseminated even if, as was the case here, the photos and accompanying articles relate exclusively to details of her private life."

Thus, the court ruled in favor of Princess Caroline, observing that the criteria established by the German courts to protect her privacy were insufficient to ensure the effective protection of her private life.

== Concurring opinions ==
Judges Cabral Barreto and Zupančič filed concurring opinions but based on different reasoning.

Judge Cabral Barreto held, contrary to the opinion of the majority, that information about the life of a public figure such as Princess Caroline did, in fact, contribute to a debate of general interest. It was necessary to look on a case-by-case basis at whether particular situations gave rise to a legitimate expectation of privacy.

Judge Zupančič agreed with the outcome of the case but also with the observations by Judge Cabral Barreto. He emphasized the impossibility of "an iron curtain [separating] private life from public performance" and the need to try to strike a balance - but also criticized making "a fetish of the freedom of the press." The question was not whether an individual was a private or public figure but whether, in the circumstances, there was a reasonable expectation of privacy - this would allow a more nuanced approach to the situations arising in particular cases.

== Von Hannover v. Germany (No. 2) ==
This case was decided by a Grand Chamber of the European Court of Human Rights on 7 February 2012. It involved applications by Princess Caroline and her husband Prince Ernest August von Hannover in respect of four photographs that had appeared in the German press.

Three photos had appeared in the magazine Frau im Spiegel. Of these, the first photograph showed the couple on a walk during a skiing holiday in St. Moritz, accompanying a story about Princess Caroline's ailing father Prince Rainier III. The second photograph again showed the couple taking a walk in St. Moritz, accompanied by a story about how happy they and others were to meet up there. The third photograph showed the couple in a chair lift, again in St. Moritz, accompanying a story mainly about an event called the Rose Ball to take place in Morocco (though it mentioned Prince Rainier's ill health).

The remaining photograph had appeared in the magazine Frau Aktuell. It was similar, or identical, to the first photo in Frau im Spiegel and accompanied a story about the health of Prince Rainier.

The outcome of proceedings through the German court system was the prince and princess were able to obtain injunctions against the publication of the second and third photos in Frau im Spiegel but not against the first photograph or against the photo in Frau Aktuell: after a processing of reasoning and balancing rights, the German courts concluded that the photos that it permitted were sufficiently connected to a matter of public interest, namely the health of Prince Rainier.

In opposing the application, the German government provided evidence that the German courts had adopted a more protective stance toward the privacy of public figures following from the original Von Hannover v. Germany case. In this case, however, they had declined to ban further publication of what amounted to one photograph because it was connected with a newsworthy story and had not been taken in any unfavorable circumstances such as being surreptitious or overly intrusive.

In the event, the court found against the applicants in this case on the basis that the photos in dispute had sufficient connection to a debate of general interest; here it noted approvingly that: "The Federal Constitutional Court, for its part, observed that the Federal Court of Justice had accepted that the reigning Prince of Monaco’s illness could be regarded as a matter of general interest and that the press was therefore entitled to report on how the prince’s children reconciled their obligations of family solidarity with the legitimate needs of their private life, among which was the desire to go on holiday." Thus, these photographs, in context, had a legitimate role to play in public discussion and the formation of public opinion.

== Von Hannover v. Germany (No. 3) ==
This case was decided on 19 September 2013. It related to a photo of Princess Caroline and her husband on holiday in an unidentified location. The decision is available in French, Czech, and German, but not English.

The disputed photo, published in the magazine 7Tage, was accompanied by other photos featuring the couple's villa in Kenya. The accompanying story was about a trend among nobility and Hollywood stars to rent out their holiday homes when not using them.

In the German courts, the litigation had gone all the way to the Federal Constitutional Court on two occasions - and there it was held that the article was relevant to a story that was, in turn, about a topic capable of provoking debate on a matter of general interest.

The court concluded: "Dans ces conditions, et eu égard à la marge d’appréciation dont les juridictions nationales disposent en la matière lorsqu’elles mettent en balance des intérêts divergents (Von Hannover (no 2), précité, § 126), la Cour conclut que les juridictions nationales n’ont pas manqué à leurs obligations positives à l’égard de la requérante au titre de l’article 8 de la Convention. Partant, il n’y a pas eu violation de cette disposition."

This can be translated as: "In these circumstances, and having regard to the margin of appreciation enjoyed by national courts in this matter when balancing divergent interests (Von Hannover (no. 2), cited above, § 126), the Court concludes that the national courts did not fail in their positive obligations towards the applicant under Article 8 of the Convention. Accordingly, there has been no violation of this provision."

== See also ==
- Privacy in English law
