= List of privacy injunction cases in English law =

This article lists cases in English law where anonymised privacy injunctions have been obtained. As super-injunctions can also be considered a type of anonymised privacy injunction they have also been included below.

== Anonymised privacy injunctions ==
Case	Notes
ABC & Others v Telegraph Media Group Ltd	Involves a businessman, alleged sexual misconduct in the workplace, and non-disclosure agreements. The businessman was named as Sir Philip Green by Lord Hain using Parliamentary Privilege.
AMM v HXW	Also known as Clarkson v Hall after broadcaster Jeremy Clarkson voluntarily lifted the injunction.
ASG v GSA	Involves a well known person who had an adulterous relationship
CBL v Person Unknown	Beyond the fact that it exists no information is known about this injunction.
CDE & FGH v Mirror Group Newspapers and LMN	A misuse of private information claim
Christoper Hutcheson (previously known as KGM) v News Group Newspapers	Concerned the private life of Christoper Hutcheson.
ETK v News Group Newspapers Ltd	An entertainment actor's affair.
Goldsmith v BCD	Hacking of Zac Goldsmith's e-mails.
Gray v UVW	Urgent interim injunction granted restraining the defendant from publishing confidential information.
JIH v News Group Newspapers Ltd	Relates to a sportsman.
KJH v HGF	Blackmail case.
LOD v News Group Newspapers Ltd	Nothing beyond the case name is known. Judgment was ordered on 19/09/2008.
MNB v News Group	Concerned the private life of banker Fred Goodwin. Breached by John Hemming MP using Parliamentary Privilege.
MJN v News Group Newspapers Ltd	Alleged affair of a Premiership footballer.
NEJ v Wood	Concerns an alleged relationship between Helen Wood and a well-known actor
OPQ v BJM	Blackmail case.
POI v Lina	Blackmail case
PJS v News Group Newspapers	Involves two well known figures in entertainment. Injunction was to be lifted by the Court of Appeal after their identities were revealed abroad and in Scotland, but remained in force following appeal to the Supreme Court.
QWE v SDF, GHJ and RTY	Blackmail regarding a sexual relationship
RJA v AJR	Misuse of private information and harassment.
Secretary of State for the Home Department v AP (No. 2)	Threat of violence to man formerly subject to a control order.
STU v UVW and XYZ	A case record exists on Bailii but no facts are included
TSE and ELP v News Group Newspapers	Involves a footballer
TUV v Persons Unknown	Information stolen from electronic devices.
VAM v Persons Unknown	Further information about this injunction is not known.
WER v REW	Chris Hutcheson took out an injunction against a website wishing to prevent details of his private life being made public
WXY v Henry Gewanter	Breach of confidence and misuse of private information.
XJA v News Group Newspapers Ltd	Involves a "well known person".
YYZ v YVR	Involves a well known person.
ZAM v CFW & TFW	Interim injunction to prevent publication of very serious allegation including criminal conduct.
ZXC v BNM	An England footballer has an injunction in place to prevent the misuse of private information about him.
Z v Persons Unknown	Unreported case

== Lifetime privacy injunctions ==
Lifetime privacy injunctions prevent the publication of a new identity.

Case	Details
Carr v News Group Newspapers Ltd	Granted to Maxine Carr following the Soham murders
Venables v News Group Newspapers	Granted to killers of James Bulger
X (a woman formerly known as Mary Bell and Y v O'Brien)	Granted to child killer Mary Bell

== Super-injunctions ==
The following cases are super-injunctions where the existence of the injunction itself was also secret:

Case	Method of Revelation
RJW v Guardian News and Media Ltd (Trafigura)	Paul Farrelly, MP for Newcastle-under-Lyme, had tabled a parliamentary question revealing the existence of the injunction.
Ntuli v Donald	A super-injunction was granted but later dischargd.
DFT v TFD	A super-injunction was granted but later discontinued.
Terry v Persons Unknown	Application for a super-injunction was rejected.
CTB v News Group Newspapers	Revealed by John Hemming MP using Parliamentary privilege.
Andrew Marr and anonymous	Unreported case. Issued in 2008, its existence was revealed by Andrew Marr in a 2011 interview.
