= List of known legal cases involving super-injunctions =

This article is a list of known legal cases involving super-injunctions, a type of anonymised privacy injunction that prevents both (a) the publication of why an injunction has been obtained and (b) the publication that an injunction has been obtained. Due to their nature this list can only include known super-injunctions that have either been disclosed voluntarily, breached in contempt of court, discontinued or revealed using parliamentary privilege. Super-injunctions should not be confused with anonymised privacy injunctions that do not prevent publication of the fact that an injunction has been obtained.

== List of known super-injunction cases ==
Case	Method of Revelation
RJW v Guardian News and Media Ltd	Paul Farrelly, MP for Newcastle-under-Lyme, had tabled a parliamentary question revealing the existence of the injunction.
Ntuli v Donald	A super-injunction was granted but set aside on appeal.
DFT v TFD	A super-injunction was granted but later discontinued.
Terry v Persons Unknown	Application for a super-injunction was rejected.
CTB v News Group Newspapers	Revealed by John Hemming MP using Parliamentary privilege and also revealed on social media in contempt of court.
Andrew Marr and anonymous	Issued in 2008, its existence was revealed by Andrew Marr in a 2011 interview.
PJS v News Group Newspapers	Issued in 2016, international and Scottish newspapers revealed the name of the celebrity couple, although the Supreme Court granted a super-injunction covering England and Wales.
