= Super-injunctions in English law =

Legal restriction which also restricts the reporting of its own existence

In English tort law, a super-injunction is a type of injunction that prevents publication of information that is in issue and also prevents the reporting of the fact that the injunction exists at all. The term was coined by a Guardian journalist covering the 2006 Ivory Coast toxic waste dump controversy that had resulted in Trafigura obtaining a controversial injunction. Due to their very nature media organisations are not able to report who has obtained a super-injunction without being in contempt of court.

The term "super-injunction" has sometimes also been used imprecisely in the media to refer to any anonymised privacy injunction preventing publication of private information.

Critics of super-injunctions have argued that they stifle free speech; that they are ineffective as they can be breached using the Internet and social media; and that the taking out of an injunction can have the unintended consequence of publicising the information more widely, a phenomenon known as the Streisand effect.

== Terminology and application ==
The Neuberger Committee notes that the terminology surrounding privacy injunctions has been used imprecisely and the term "super-injunction" has been used to refer to:

- Injunctions that provide anonymity for one or both parties.
- Injunctions that prohibit reporting of the substantive facts and proceedings of a case.
- Injunctions that provide anonymity for one or both parties, prohibit reporting of the substantive facts and proceedings of a case and prohibit access to court files.

The committee adopt the definition that a super-injunction is

an interim injunction which restrains a person from: (i) publishing information which concerns the applicant and is said to be confidential or private; and (ii) publicising or informing others of the existence of the order and the proceedings (the "super" element of the order).

An anonymised injunction is a type of injunction which restrains a person from publishing information concerning an applicant that is said to be confidential or private. An anonymised injunction differs from a super-injunction in that it does not restrain the publicising or informing of others of the existence of the order and the proceedings. The term "hyper-injunction" has been used to describe a type of super-injunction that also forbids a person from discussing the issue in question with journalists, lawyers or Members of Parliament. Such injunctions have been criticised as anti-democratic and the former Liberal Democrat MP John Hemming used Parliamentary privilege to reveal the existence of a hyper-injunction surrounding an allegation that the type of paint used in water tanks on some passenger ships could break down and release toxic chemicals.

Super-injunctions are also applied in Northern Ireland. In January 2020, it was reported that seven super-injunctions were in effect in Northern Ireland.

== Cases ==
Due to their very nature it is not possible to say exactly how many super-injunctions exist or have been issued. The Neuberger Committee that examined super-injunctions stated: "at present, there are records of only a limited number of cases; specific records are not at present kept in respect of such matters". The Neuberger Committee report does not specify how many have been granted in the past but does state that only two super-injunctions had been granted since the John Terry case: Ntuli v Donald [2010] EWCA Civ 1276) and DFT v TFD [2010] EWHC 2335 (QB). The Daily Telegraph reported in 2011 that 12 super-injunctions existed. Below are known super-injunctions that have become public:

Case	Method of revelation
RJW v Guardian News and Media Ltd (Trafigura, 2009)	Paul Farrelly, MP for Newcastle-under-Lyme, had tabled a parliamentary question revealing the existence of the injunction.
Ntuli v Donald (2011)	A super-injunction was granted but later discontinued.
DFT v TFD (2010)	A super-injunction was granted but later discontinued.
John Terry v persons unknown (2010)	Application for a super-injunction was rejected after being granted on a temporary basis.
Andrew Marr and anonymous (2008)	Issued in 2008, the "super" part of the injunction was lifted shortly afterwards and its existence (but not its subject) was reported by Private Eye and The Independent. Its subject was revealed by Andrew Marr in a 2011 interview.
NMC v persons unknown (2009)	The Guardian reported that a case with this name exists and that it is a former super-injunction. Laura Scaife's Handbook of Social Media and the Law also refers to this case as a super-injunction but the facts of the case are not publicly known. The order date of the super-injunction is 9 February 2009.
WER v REW (Christoper Hutcheson v News Group Newspapers, 2009)	Super-injunction granted but the courts later refused to continue it.
Ministry of Defence v Global Media and Entertainment Ltd and others (2023)	A super-injunction was granted but discontinued in 2025. Defence Secretary John Healey made a parliamentary statement.

Several cases have been inaccurately described as super-injunctions in the media. These include:

Case	Notes
MNB v News Group Newspapers (2011)	Incorrectly referred to as a super-injunction by John Hemming MP in the House of Commons.
PJS v News Group Newspapers (2016)	Incorrectly referred to as a super-injunction on social media.

== Disclosure ==
There are several ways in which the public can learn of a super-injunction:

Instance	Example
When a judge refuses to continue a super-injunction	In DFT v TFD a super-injunction was granted but later discontinued
When parliamentary privilege is used to reveal an injunction	RJW v Guardian News and Media Ltd
When a super-injunction is breached in contempt of court	
When a super-injunction is reported somewhere outside of the jurisdiction of English courts	CTB v News Group Newspapers Ltd was reported on Twitter, under US jurisdiction
When a person who has taken out a super-injunction volunteers this information	Andrew Marr and anonymous - issued in 2008, its existence was revealed by Andrew Marr in a 2011 interview

== Criticism ==
Super-injunctions have been criticised on various grounds including that they stifle free speech; are ineffective; and risk drawing further attention to an issue. The Daily Mirror newspaper has criticised super-injunctions as existing only for an elite highlighting a poll that 79% of people believe super-injunctions exist for the rich and powerful alone. Super-injunctions have also been criticised on feminist grounds with Maeve Mckeown arguing that "superinjunction allows rich men to legally protect their reputations at the expense of less-rich women".

== See also ==
- 2011 British privacy injunctions controversy
- Censorship in the United Kingdom
- DSMA-Notice
- List of known legal cases involving super-injunctions
- Privacy in English law
