= List of acts of the Parliament of Great Britain from 1770 =

This is a complete list of acts of the Parliament of Great Britain for the year 1770.

For acts passed until 1707, see the list of acts of the Parliament of England and the list of acts of the Parliament of Scotland. See also the list of acts of the Parliament of Ireland.

For acts passed from 1801 onwards, see the list of acts of the Parliament of the United Kingdom. For acts of the devolved parliaments and assemblies in the United Kingdom, see the list of acts of the Scottish Parliament, the list of acts of the Northern Ireland Assembly, and the list of acts and measures of Senedd Cymru; see also the list of acts of the Parliament of Northern Ireland.

The number shown after each act's title is its chapter number. Acts are cited using this number, preceded by the year(s) of the reign during which the relevant parliamentary session was held; thus the Union with Ireland Act 1800 is cited as "39 & 40 Geo. 3 c. 67", meaning the 67th act passed during the session that started in the 39th year of the reign of George III and which finished in the 40th year of that reign. Note that the modern convention is to use Arabic numerals in citations (thus "41 Geo. 3" rather than "41 Geo. III"). Acts of the last session of the Parliament of Great Britain and the first session of the Parliament of the United Kingdom are both cited as "41 Geo. 3".

Acts passed by the Parliament of Great Britain did not have a short title; however, some of these acts have subsequently been given a short title by acts of the Parliament of the United Kingdom (such as the Short Titles Act 1896).

Before the Acts of Parliament (Commencement) Act 1793 came into force on 8 April 1793, acts passed by the Parliament of Great Britain were deemed to have come into effect on the first day of the session in which they were passed. Because of this, the years given in the list below may in fact be the year before a particular act was passed.

== 10 Geo. 3 ==
The third session of the 13th Parliament of Great Britain, which met from 9 January 1770 until 19 May 1770.

This session was also traditionally cited as 10 G. 3.

=== Public acts ===
Short title	Citation	Royal assent
Long title
Exportation Act 1770 (repealed)	10 Geo. 3. c. 1	29 January 1770
An Act for continuing an Act, made in the last Session of Parliament, (Note: Exportation Act 1769 (9 Geo. 3. c. 1)) to prohibit, for a further Time, the Exportation of Corn, Grain, Meal, Malt, Flour, Bread, Biscuit, and Starch; and also the Extraction of Low Wines and Spirits from Wheat and Wheat Flour. (Repealed by Statute Law Revision Act 1867 (30 & 31 Vict. c. 59))
Importation Act 1770 (repealed)	10 Geo. 3. c. 2	29 January 1770
An Act to continue, for a further Time, an Act, made in the Eighth Year of His present Majesty's Reign, (Note: Importation Act 1768 (8 Geo. 3. c. 9)) intituled, "An Act to continue, and amend an Act, made in the Fifth Year of the Reign of His present Majesty, (Note: Importation Act 1765 (5 Geo. 3. c. 1)) intituled, 'An Act for Importation of Salted Beef, Pork, Bacon, and Butter, from Ireland, for a limited Time;' and for allowing the Importation of Salted Beef, Pork, Bacon, and Butter, from the British Dominions in America, for a limited Time." (Repealed by Statute Law Revision Act 1867 (30 & 31 Vict. c. 59))
Mutiny Act 1770 (repealed)	10 Geo. 3. c. 3	16 February 1770
An Act for punishing Mutiny and Desertion, And for the better Payment of the Army and their Quarters. (Repealed by Statute Law Revision Act 1867 (30 & 31 Vict. c. 59))
Distempter Among Cattle Act 1770 (repealed)	10 Geo. 3. c. 4	16 February 1770
An Act, for indemnifying all Persons, with respect to advising or carrying into Execution His Majesty's Orders of Council made for preventing the spreading of a contagious Distemper amongst the Horned Cattle, and for rendering the same valid And effectual, and for preventing Suits in consequence thereof; and to authorize the continuing, extending, and executing, the same, for a further Time. (Repealed by Statute Law Revision Act 1867 (30 & 31 Vict. c. 59))
Malt Duties Act 1770 (repealed)	10 Geo. 3. c. 5	16 February 1770
An Act for continuing and granting to His Majesty certain Duties upon Malt, Mum, Cyder, And Perry, for the Service of the Year One thousand seven hundred and seventy. (Repealed by Statute Law Revision Act 1867 (30 & 31 Vict. c. 59))
Land Tax Act 1770 (repealed)	10 Geo. 3. c. 6	16 February 1770
An Act for granting an Aid to His Majesty by a Land Tax, to be raised in Great Britain, for the Service of the Year One thousand seven hundred and seventy. (Repealed by Statute Law Revision Act 1867 (30 & 31 Vict. c. 59))
Marine Mutiny Act 1770 (repealed)	10 Geo. 3. c. 7	16 February 1770
An Act for the Regulation of His Majesty's Marine Forces while on Shore. (Repealed by Statute Law Revision Act 1867 (30 & 31 Vict. c. 59))
Discontinuance of Duties Act 1770 (repealed)	10 Geo. 3. c. 8	16 March 1770
An Act to continue, for a limited Time, an Act, made in the Seventh Year of His present Majesty's Reign, intituled, "An Act to discontinue; for a limited Time, the Duties payable upon the Importation of Tallow, Hog's Lard, and Grease." (Note: Importation (No. 6) Act 1766 (7 Geo. 3. c. 12)) (Repealed by Statute Law Revision Act 1867 (30 & 31 Vict. c. 59))
Militia Pay Act 1770 (repealed)	10 Geo. 3. c. 9	29 March 1770
An Act for defraying the Charge of the Pay and Cloathing of the Militia in that Part of Great Britain called England, for One Year, beginning the Twenty-fifth Day of March One thousand seven hundred and seventy. (Repealed by Statute Law Revision Act 1867 (30 & 31 Vict. c. 59))
Exportation (No. 2) Act 1770 (repealed)	10 Geo. 3. c. 10	29 March 1770
An Act to permit the Exportation of Malt. (Repealed by Statute Law Revision Act 1867 (30 & 31 Vict. c. 59))
Unfunded Debt Act 1770 (repealed)	10 Geo. 3. c. 11	29 March 1770
An Act for raising a certain Sum of Money, by Loans or Exchequer Bills, for the Service of the Year One thousand seven hundred and seventy. (Repealed by Statute Law Revision Act 1867 (30 & 31 Vict. c. 59))
Composition for a Certain Crown Debt Act 1770 (repealed)	10 Geo. 3. c. 12	29 March 1770
An Act to enable the Commissioners for executing the Office of Treasurer of His Majesty's Exchequer, or the Lord High Treasurer for the Time being, to compound with William Hill and John Dyer a Debt due to the Crown from William Pye, for which they are Sureties. (Repealed by Statute Law Revision Act 1867 (30 & 31 Vict. c. 59))
Grant of Manor of Corsham to Paul Methuen Act 1770 (repealed)	10 Geo. 3. c. 13	29 March 1770
An Act for enabling His Majesty to grant the Inheritance, in Fee Simple, of the Manor of Cosham, in the County of Wilts, with the Rights, Members, and Appurtenances thereof, now held under a Demise, by Letters Patent under the Seal of His Majesty's Court of Exchequer, in Trust for Paul Methuen Esquire, unto the said Paul Methuen and his Heirs, upon a full and adequate Consideration to be paid for the same. (Repealed by Statute Law (Repeals) Act 1978 (c. 45))
Plymouth Improvement Act 1770 (repealed)	10 Geo. 3. c. 14	12 April 1770
An Act for paving, lighting, and watching, the Town of Plymouth, in the County of Devon, and for regulating the Carmen and Porters within the said Town. (Repealed by Plymouth Improvement Act 1824 (5 Geo. 4. c. xxii))
Mutiny (No. 2) Act 1770 (repealed)	10 Geo. 3. c. 15	12 April 1770
An Act to continue an Act, made in the last session of Parliament, (Note: Mutiny in America Act 1769 (9 Geo. 3. c. 18)) intituled, "An Act for amending and further continuing an Act of the Sixth Year of His present Majesty's Reign, (Note: Mutiny in America Act 1766 (6 Geo. 3. c. 18)) intituled, 'An Act to amend and render more effectual, in His Majesty's Dominions in America, an Act, passed in this present session of Parliament, (Note: Mutiny Act 1766 (6 Geo. 3. c. 8)) intituled, "An Act for punishing Mutiny and Desertion, and for the better Payment of the Army and their Quarters."'" (Repealed by Statute Law Revision Act 1867 (30 & 31 Vict. c. 59))
Parliamentary Elections Act 1770 or the Grenville Act (repealed)	10 Geo. 3. c. 16	12 April 1770
An Act to regulate the Trials of Controverted Elections, or Returns of Members to serve in Parliament. (Repealed by Controverted Elections Act 1828 (9 Geo. 4. c. 22))
Customs Act 1770 (repealed)	10 Geo. 3. c. 17	12 April 1770
An Act so repeal so much of an Act, made in the Seventh Year of His present Majesty's Reign, intituled, "An Act for granting certain Duties in the British Colonies and Plantations in America; for allowing a Drawback of the Duties of Customs upon the Exportation from this Kingdom of Coffee and Cocoa Nuts of the Produce of the said Colonies or Plantations; for discontinuing the Drawbacks payable on China Earthen Ware exported to America; and for more effectually preventing the clandestine Running of Goods in the said Colonies and Plantations," (Note: Duties on Tea, etc. (American Plantations) Act 1766 (7 Geo. 3. c. 46)) as relates to the Duties upon Glass, Red-lead, White-lead, Painters Colours, Paper, Paste-boards, Mill-boards, and Scale-boards, of the Produce or Manufacture of Great Britain, imported into any of His Majesty's Colonies in America; and also to the discontinuing the Drawbacks payable on China Earthen Ware exported to America; and for regulating the Exportation thereof. (Repealed by Statute Law Revision Act 1867 (30 & 31 Vict. c. 59))
Dog Stealing Act 1770 (repealed)	10 Geo. 3. c. 18	12 April 1770
An Act for preventing the Stealing of Dogs. (Repealed for England and Wales by Criminal Statutes Repeal Act 1827 (7 & 8 Geo. 4. c. 27) and for India by Criminal Law (India) Act 1828 (9 Geo. 4. c. 74))
Game Act 1770 (repealed)	10 Geo. 3. c. 19	12 April 1770
An Act for better Preservation of the Game within that Part of Great Britain called England. (Repealed by Game Act 1773 (13 Geo. 3. c. 80))
King's Lynn (Small Debts) Act 1770 (repealed)	10 Geo. 3. c. 20	12 April 1770
An Act for the more easy and speedy Recovery of Small Debts within the Borough of King's Lynn and the Liberties thereof. (Repealed by County Courts Act 1846 (9 & 10 Vict. c. 95))
Lancashire (Small Debts) Act 1770 (repealed)	10 Geo. 3. c. 21	12 April 1770
An Act for the more easy and speedy Recovery of Small Debts within the Parishes of Poulton, Kirkham, Lytham, and Bispham, and Townships of Preesall and Stalmine, in the County Palatine of Lancaster. (Repealed by County Courts Act 1846 (9 & 10 Vict. c. 95))
Worcester (Improvement) Act 1770 (repealed)	10 Geo. 3. c. 22	12 April 1770
An Act for better supplying the City of Worcester and the Liberties thereof with Water, and for the better paving and lighting the said City, and for removing and preventing all Obstructions and Annoyances therein. (Repealed by Worcester Water Act 1823 (4 Geo. 4. c. lxix))
Saint Marylebone (Improvement) Act 1770 (repealed)	10 Geo. 3. c. 23	12 April 1770
An Act for the more effectually paving, repairing, cleansing, and lighting the Streets, Squares, Lanes, and other Passages, and for regulating Weights and Measures, within the Parish of Saint Mary le Bone, in the County of Middlesex; and for other Purposes therein mentioned. (Repealed by Saint Marylebone Improvement Act 1795 (35 Geo. 3. c. 73))
Watchett Harbour Act 1770 (repealed)	10 Geo. 3. c. 24	12 April 1770
An Act for further Continuing the Duties granted and continued by several Acts, made in the Sixth (Note: Watchet Harbour Act 1707 (6 Ann. c. 69)) and Tenth (Note: Minehead Harbour Act 1711 (10 Ann. c. 32)) Years of the Reign of Queen Anne, and in the Seventh Year of the Reign of King George the First, (Note: Watchet Harbour Act 1720 (7 Geo. 1. St. 1. c. 14)) for repairing the Harbour and Key of Watchett, in the County of Somerset. (Repealed by Watchet Harbour Act 1857 (20 & 21 Vict. c. cxli))
Southampton Improvement Act 1770 (repealed)	10 Geo. 3. c. 25	12 April 1770
An Act for the better paving, repairing, and cleansing, the Streets and other publick Passages in the several Parishes and Wards of Saint Michael, Saint John, Holy Rhood, Saint Lawrence, All Saints within the Bar, All Saints without the Bar, and East Street and Bag Row, within the Town of Southampton and Liberties thereof, and for preventing Nuisances and Annoyances therein; and for widening and rendering the same more commodious; and for the lighting and watching the said Streets and public Passages. (Repealed by Southampton Improvement Act 1810 (50 Geo. 3. c. clxix) and Southampton Improvement Act 1844 (7 & 8 Vict. c. lxxv))
Minehead Harbour Act 1770 (repealed)	10 Geo. 3. c. 26	12 April 1770
An Act For further continuing the Terms and Powers granted and continued by Three Acts, passed in the Twelfth and Thirteenth Years of William the Third, (Note: Minehead Harbour Act 1700 (12 & 13 Will. 3. c. 9)) the Tenth of Queen Anne, (Note: Minehead Harbour Act 1711 (10 Ann. c. 32)) and in the Eleventh Year of His late Majesty George the Second, (Note: Minehead Harbour Act 1737 (11 Geo. 2. c. 8)) for recovering, securing, and keeping in Repair, the Harbour of Minehead, in the County of Somerset, and for the more effectual carrying the said Acts, into Execution, and also for the better securing the ancient Dues payable to the Lord or Lady of the Manor of Minehead for the Time being. (Repealed by Minehead Pier and Harbour Act 1823 (4 Geo. 4. c. cxiii))
River Nar Navigation Act 1770	10 Geo. 3. c. 27	12 April 1770
An Act to enlarge the Powers of an Act of the Twenty-fourth Year of His late Majesty, (Note: Nar Navigation Act 1750 (24 Geo. 2. c. 19)) for making the River Nar navigable from the Town and Port of King's Lynn to Westacre, in the County of Norfolk, and for making the said Act more effectual.
Chelmsford Gaol Act 1770 (repealed)	10 Geo. 3. c. 28	12 April 1770
An Act for rebuilding the Common Gaol of the County of Essex. (Repealed by Statute Law Revision Act 1948 (11 & 12 Geo. 6. c. 62))
Blackheath, etc., Small Debts Act 1770 (repealed)	10 Geo. 3. c. 29	19 May 1770
An Act to explain, amend, and make more effectual, an Act, passed in the Fifth Year of His Majesty's Reign, intituled, "An Act for the more easy and speedy Recovery of Small Debts, within the Hundreds of Blackheath, of Bromley and Beckenham, of Rokesley otherwise Ruxley, and Little and Lessess, in the County of Kent;" (Note: Small Debts, Blackheath, etc. Act 1765 (5 Geo. 3. c. 8)) and One other Act, passed in the Sixth Year of His Majesty's Reign, (Note: Small Debts, Kent, etc. Act 1766 (6 Geo. 3. c. 6)) for extending the Provisions of the Said Act to the hundred of Wallington, in the County of Surry. (Repealed by Surrey and Kent Courts of Request Act 1836 (6 & 7 Will. 4. c. cxx))
Customs (No. 2) Act 1770 (repealed)	10 Geo. 3. c. 30	19 May 1770
An Act for rectifying a Mistake in an Act, made in the last Session of Parliament, intituled, "An Act for better securing the Duties of Customs upon certain Goods removed from the Out Ports and other Places to London; for regulating the Fees of the Officers of His Majesty's Customs in the Province of Senegambia in Africa; for allowing to the Receivers General of the Duties on Offices and Employments in Scotland, a proper Compensation for their Trouble and Expences; for the better Preservation of Hollies, Thorns, and Quicksets, in Forests, Chaces, and private Grounds, and of Trees and Underwoods in Forests and Chases; and for authorizing the Exportation of a limited Quantity of an inferior Sort of Barley called Bigg, from the Port of Kirkwall in the Islands of Orkney." (Note: Customs, etc. (No. 2) Act 1769 (9 Geo. 3. c. 41)) (Repealed by Statute Law Revision Act 1867 (30 & 31 Vict. c. 59))
Exportation (No. 3) Act 1770 (repealed)	10 Geo. 3. c. 31	19 May 1770
An Act for extending like Liberty in the Exportation of Rice from East and West Florida to the Southward of Cape Finisterre in Europe, as is granted, by former Acts of Parliament, to Carolina and Georgia. (Repealed by Statute Law Revision Act 1867 (30 & 31 Vict. c. 59))
New Office of Excise Act 1770 (repealed)	10 Geo. 3. c. 32	19 May 1770
An Act for defraying the Expence of building the New Office of Excise in London, out of His Majesty's Revenue of Excise. (Repealed by Statute Law Revision Act 1867 (30 & 31 Vict. c. 59))
Land Tax (Commissioners) Act 1770 (repealed)	10 Geo. 3. c. 33	19 May 1770
An Act for rectifying Mistakes in the Names of several of the Commissioners appointed by an Act, made in the last Session of Parliament, (Note: Land Tax (Commissioners) Act 1769 (9 Geo. 3. c. 14)) to put in Execution an Act, made in the same Session, intituled, "An Act for granting an Aid to His Majesty, by a Land Tax to be raised in Great Britain, for the Service of the Year One thousand seven hundred and sixty-nine," (Note: Land Tax Act 1769 (9 Geo. 3. c. 5)) and for appointing other Commissioners, together with those named in the first mentioned Act, to put in Execution an Act of this Session of Parliament, (Note: Land Tax Act 1770 (10 Geo. 3. c. 6)) for granting an Aid to His Majesty, by a Land Tax to be raised in Great Britain, for the Service of the Year One thousand seven hundred and seventy. (Repealed by Statute Law Revision Act 1867 (30 & 31 Vict. c. 59))
Discovery of Longitude at Sea Act 1770 (repealed)	10 Geo. 3. c. 34	19 May 1770
An Act for rendering more effectual several Acts for providing a Publick Reward for discovering the Longitude at Sea; for improving the Lunar Tables constructed by the late Professor Mayer; and for encouraging Discoveries and Improvements useful to Navigation. (Repealed by Statute Law Revision Act 1867 (30 & 31 Vict. c. 59))
Colony of New York Act 1770 (repealed)	10 Geo. 3. c. 35	19 May 1770
An Act to enable the Governor, Council, and Assembly, of His Majesty's Colony of New York, to pass an Act of Assembly for creating and issuing, upon Loan, Paper Bills of Credit to a certain Amount; and to make the same a legal Tender in Payments into the Loan Offices and Treasury of the Said Colony. (Repealed by Statute Law Revision Act 1867 (30 & 31 Vict. c. 59))
National Debt Act 1770 (repealed)	10 Geo. 3. c. 36	19 May 1770
An Act for redeeming the Capital or Joint Stock of Annuities, after the Rate of Three Pounds Ten Shillings per Centum, established by an Act, made in the Twenty-ninth Year or the Reign of His late Majesty King George the Second, intituled, "An Act for granting to His Majesty the Sum of Two Millions, to be raised by Way of Annuities and a Lottery, and charged on the Sinking Fund, redeemable by Parliament; and for extending to Ireland the Laws made in this Kingdom against private and unlawful Lotteries." (Note: National Debt Act 1756 (29 Geo. 2. c. 7)) (Repealed by Statute Law Revision Act 1870 (33 & 34 Vict. c. 69))
Making of Indigo, etc. Act 1770 (repealed)	10 Geo. 3. c. 37	19 May 1770
An Act for continuing so much of an Act, made in the Third Year of His present Majesty's Reign, (Note: Continuance etc. of Acts Act 1763 (3 Geo. 3. c. 25)) intituled, "An Act to continue and amend Two Acts, made in the Twenty-first (Note: Importation of Indigo Act 1747 (21 Geo. 2. c. 30)) and Twenty-eighth (Note: Making of Indigo Act 1755 (28 Geo. 2. c. 25)) Years of His late Majesty's Reign, for encouraging the making of Indict in the British Plantations in America; and for the extending the Provisions of an Act of the Thirtieth Year of His late Majesty's Reign, (Note: Prize Goods Act 1757 (30 Geo. 2. c. 18)) with respect to bringing Prize Goods into this Kingdom, to Spanish Prize Goods taken since the late Declaration of War with Spain," as relates to encouraging the making of Indico in the British Plantations in America; and for explaining so much of an Act, made in the Fifth Year of His present Majesty's Reign, (Note: Customs, etc. Act 1765 (5 Geo. 3. c. 45)) as relates to the regulating the Fees of the Officers of the Customs in America, and for extending the same to the Naval Officers there. (Repealed by Statute Law Revision Act 1867 (30 & 31 Vict. c. 59))
Exportation (No. 4) Act 1770 (repealed)	10 Geo. 3. c. 38	19 May 1770
An Act for continuing the Bounties on British and Irish Linens exported; for further discontinuing the Duties on the Importation of Foreign Raw Linen Yarns made of Flax; and for granting a Bounty on the Exportation of British Checqued and Striped Linens, and upon British and Irish Diapers, Huckabacks, Sheeting, and other Linen of above a certain Breadth. (Repealed by Customs Law Repeal Act 1825 (6 Geo. 4. c. 105))
Corn Act 1770 (repealed)	10 Geo. 3. c. 39	19 May 1770
An Act for registering the Prices at which Corn is sold in the Counties of Great Britain, and the Quantity exported and imported. (Repealed by the Importation and Exportation (No. 2) Act 1791 (31 Geo. 3. c. 30))
Hemp and Flax Act 1770 (repealed)	10 Geo. 3. c. 40	19 May 1770
An Act for appropriating a Fund established by an Act, made in the Seventh Year of the Reign of His present Majesty, intituled, "An Act for granting to His Majesty additional Duties on certain Foreign Linens imported into this Kingdom; and for establishing a Fund for the encouraging of the railing and dressing of Hemp and Flax." (Note: Customs Act 1767 (7 Geo. 3. c. 58)) (Repealed by Statute Law Revision Act 1867 (30 & 31 Vict. c. 59))
Recess Elections Act 1770 (repealed)	10 Geo. 3. c. 41	19 May 1770
An Act to enable the Speaker of the House of Commons to issue his Warrants to make out new Writs for the Choice of Members to serve in Parliament, in the Room of such Members as shall die during the Recess of Parliament. (Repealed by Recess Elections Act 1784 (24 Geo. 3. Sess. 2. c. 26))
Indemnity Act 1770 (repealed)	10 Geo. 3. c. 42	19 May 1770
An Act to indemnify such Persons in Great Britain and Ireland as have omitted to qualify themselves for Offices and Employments within the Time limited by Law, and for allowing further Time for that Purpose; for allowing further Time for registering and enrolling Agreements entered into for enclosing Commons, for the Purpose of planting and preserving Trees for Timber or Underwood; and for indemnifying Persons who have omitted to make and file Affidavits of the Execution of Indentures of Clerks to Attornies and Solicitors. (Repealed by Statute Law Revision Act 1867 (30 & 31 Vict. c. 59))
Customs (No. 3) Act 1770 (repealed)	10 Geo. 3. c. 43	19 May 1770
An Act for repealing the duties upon Baft or Straw, Chip, Cane, and Horsehair Hats and Bonnets, and upon certain Materials for making the same, imported into this Kingdom, and for granting other Duties in Lieu thereof; and for the more effectual preventing the fraudulent Importation of such Goods. (Repealed by Customs Law Repeal Act 1825 (6 Geo. 4. c. 105))
False Weights and Scales Act 1770 (repealed)	10 Geo. 3. c. 44	19 May 1770
An Act for more effectually preventing Traders in Excisable Commodities, from using false Weights and Scales; and for explaining and amending several Acts of Parliament relating to Hackney Coaches and Chairs. (Repealed by Revenue Act 1889 (52 & 53 Vict. c. 42))
Distemper Among Cattle Act 1770 (repealed)	10 Geo. 3. c. 45	19 May 1770
An Act to prevent the further spreading of the contagious Disorder among the Horned Cattle in Great Britain. (Repealed by Statute Law Revision Act 1871 (34 & 35 Vict. c. 116))
National Debt (No. 2) Act 1770 (repealed)	10 Geo. 3. c. 46	19 May 1770
An Act for establishing a Lottery; and for other Purposes therein mentioned. (Repealed by Statute Law Revision Act 1870 (33 & 34 Vict. c. 69))
East India Company Act 1770 (repealed)	10 Geo. 3. c. 47	19 May 1770
An Act for better regulating Persons employed in the Service of the East India Company; and for other Purposes therein mentioned. (Repealed by Government of India Act 1915 (5 & 6 Geo. 5. c. 61))
Receiving Stolen Jewels, etc. Act 1770 (repealed)	10 Geo. 3. c. 48	19 May 1770
An Act for making the Receiving of Stolen, Jewels and Gold and Silver Plate, in the Case of Burglary and Highway Robbery, more penal. (Repealed for England and Wales by Criminal Statutes Repeal Act 1827 (7 & 8 Geo. 4. c. 27) and for India by Criminal Law (India) Act 1828 (9 Geo. 4. c. 74))
Bricks and Tiles Act 1770 (repealed)	10 Geo. 3. c. 49	19 May 1770
An Act for continuing and amending several Acts, for preventing Abuses in making Bricks and Tiles. (Repealed by Repeal of Obsolete Statutes Act 1856 (19 & 20 Vict. c. 64))
Parliamentary Privilege Act 1770	10 Geo. 3. c. 50	19 May 1770
An Act for the further preventing Delays of Justices, by Reason of Privilege of Parliament.
Entail Improvement Act 1770 (repealed)	10 Geo. 3. c. 51	19 May 1770
An Act to encourage the Improvement of Lands, Tenements, and Hereditaments, in that Part of Great Britain called Scotland, held under Settlements of strict Entail. (Repealed by Abolition of Feudal Tenure etc. (Scotland) Act 2000 (asp 5))
Supply, etc. Act 1770 (repealed)	10 Geo. 3. c. 52	19 May 1770
An Act for granting to His Majesty a certain Sum of Money out of the Sinking Fund; and for applying certain Monies therein mentioned for the Service of the Year One thousand seven hundred and seventy; and for further appropriating the Supplies granted in this Session of Parliament. (Repealed by Statute Law Revision Act 1867 (30 & 31 Vict. c. 59))
Thames Coalheavers Act 1770 (repealed)	10 Geo. 3. c. 53	19 May 1770
An Act to repeal an Act, passed in the Thirty-first Year of the Reign of His late Majesty King George the Second, intituled, "An Act for the Relief of the Coalheavers working upon the River Thames, and for enabling them to make Provision for such of themselves as shall be sick, lame, or past their Labour, and for their Widows and Orphans" (Note: Thames Coalheavers Act 1757 (31 Geo. 2. c. 76)) and to regulate the Price of their Labour, to prevent Frauds and Impositions on such Labourers; and for their further Relief. (Repealed by Statute Law (Repeals) Act 1976 (c. 16))
Norwich to Trowse Road Act 1770 (repealed)	10 Geo. 3. c. 54	16 February 1770
An Act for amending the Road from Saint Stephen's Gate (Note: St Stephen's Gate, St Stephens Street, Norwich, Norfolk. The gate was demolished in 1793. 52°37′27″N 1°17′26″E) in the City of Norwich, to Block Hill in Trowse, (Note: Crown Point, Block Hill, Trowse, Norfolk. 52°36′41″N 1°19′18″E) at the Angle where the Road divides to Bixley (Note: Bixley, Norfolk.) and Kirby (Note: Kirby Bedon, Norfolk.) in the County of Norfolk. (Repealed by Statute Law (Repeals) Act 2008 (c. 12))
Cardigan Roads Act 1770 (repealed)	10 Geo. 3. c. 55	16 March 1770
An Act for repairing and widening several Roads, in the County of Cardigan. (Repealed by Roads in Cardiganshire Act 1833 (3 & 4 Will. 4. c. xxxvii))
St. Paul, Shadwell (Poor Relief) Act 1770 (repealed)	10 Geo. 3. c. 56	16 March 1770
An Act for the better maintaining, regulating, and employing the Poor, within the Parish of Saint Paul Shadwell, in the County of Middlesex. (Repealed by St. Paul Shadwell Poor Relief and Improvement Act 1810 (50 Geo. 3. c. ccviii))
River Trent Navigation Act 1770	10 Geo. 3. c. 57	16 March 1770
An Act for the better regulating the Navigation of the River Trent, from Wilden Ferry, otherwise Cavendish Bridge, in the County of Derby, to Gainsborough, in the County of Lincoln.
Buckingham and Oxford Roads Act 1770 (repealed)	10 Geo. 3. c. 58	16 March 1770
An Act for amending the Road from Aylesbury, in the County of Buckingham, through Thame and Little Milton, to the Turnpike Road between Bensington and Shillingford, in the County of Oxford. (Repealed by Aylesbury and Thame Road Act 1833 (3 & 4 Will. 4. c. lxxxvi))
Lyme Regis Roads Act 1770 (repealed)	10 Geo. 3. c. 59	16 March 1770
An Act to continue and render more effectual an Act, of the Thirty-first Year of His late Majesty, (Note: Dorset and Devon Roads Act 1757 (31 Geo. 2. c. 43)) for repairing several Roads in the Counties of Dorset and Devon, leading to and through the Borough of Lyme Regis; and for repairing the Road from the Turnpike Road on Uplyme Hill, to the Turnpike Road at The Three Ashes, in the Parish of Crewkerne, in the County of Somerset; and other Roads therein mentioned. (Repealed by Lyme Regis Roads Act 1821 (1 & 2 Geo. 4. c. cviii))
Thetford and Newmarket Road Act 1770 (repealed)	10 Geo. 3. c. 60	16 March 1770
An Act for enlarging the Term and Powers of an Act, (Note: Thetford and Newmarket Road Act 1768 (8 Geo. 3. c. 55)) for amending the Road from Christopher's Bridge, in the Borough of Thetford, in the County of Suffolk, to the Northeast End of the Town of Newmarket, in the County of Cambridge. (Repealed by Thetford and Newmarket Road Act 1828 (9 Geo. 4. c. li))
Leeds and Wakefield Road Act 1770 (repealed)	10 Geo. 3. c. 61	16 March 1770
An Act to enlarge, the Term and Powers of an Act, made in the Thirty-first Year of the Reign of His late Majesty, (Note: Leeds and Wakefield Road Act 1757 (31 Geo. 2. c. 63)) for repairing the Road from Leeds to Sheffield, in the County of York, so far as the same relates to the Road from Leeds to Wakefields. (Repealed by Road from Leeds to Wakefield Act 1821 (1 & 2 Geo. 4. c. v))
Kent and Surrey Roads Act 1770 (repealed)	10 Geo. 3. c. 62	16 March 1770
An Act for the repairing, widening, and keeping in Repair, the Road leading from Eaton Bridge, Turnpike Road at Cockham Hill, in the Parish of Westerham, in the County of Kent, through the Village of Limpsfield, to the Village of Titsey, over Botley Hill, Wormsheath, and Willingham Common, to the Turnpike Road leading from Croydon to Godstone, in the County of Surry. (Repealed by Westerham and Godstone Road Act 1813 (53 Geo. 3. c. xliii) and Annual Turnpike Acts Continuance Act 1869 (32 & 33 Vict. c. 90))
Upton, Great Kington and Wellesbourne Hastings Road Act 1770 (repealed)	10 Geo. 3. c. 63	16 March 1770
An Act for repairing and widening the Road from Upton, in the Parish of Ratley, to the North End of Bridge Street in the Town of Great Kington, and from thence to the Guide Post at the Town of Wellesbourne Hastings, in the County of Warwick. (Repealed by Upton, Great Kington and Wellesbourne Hastings Road (Warwickshire) Act 1833 (3 & 4 Will. 4. c. xli))
Lewes and Brighton Road Act 1770 (repealed)	10 Geo. 3. c. 64	16 March 1770
An Act for repairing and widening the Road from Lewes to Brighthelmstone, (Note: Brighthelmston is now known as Brighton.) in the County of Sussex. (Repealed by Lewes to Brighton Road Act 1833 (3 & 4 Will. 4. c. xliii))
Barton and Brandon Road Act 1770 (repealed)	10 Geo. 3. c. 65	29 March 1770
An Act for repairing the Road from the Bridge on the Old River at Barton (Note: Barton Mills, Suffolk. 52°20′09″N 0°31′55″E) to Brandon Bridge, (Note: Brandon Bridge carrying the A1065 Brandon High Street across the River Little Ouse, Brandon, Suffolk. 52°27′04″N 0°37′23″E) in the County of Suffolk. (Repealed by Barton and Brandon Bridge Road (Suffolk) Act 1831 (1 & 2 Will. 4. c. xix))
Stafford and Cheshire Roads Act 1770 (repealed)	10 Geo. 3. c. 66	16 March 1770
An Act for repairing and widening the Road from Tunstall, in the County, of Stafford, to Bosley, in the County of Chester; and from Great Chell to Shelton, in the said County of Stafford. (Repealed by Tunstall and Bosley, and Great Chell and Shelton Roads (Staffordshire, Cheshire) Act 1833 (3 & 4 Will. 4. c. liv))
Norwich and Swaffham Road Act 1770 (repealed)	10 Geo. 3. c. 67	29 March 1770
An Act for amending and widening the Road from Saint Benedict's Gate, in the County of the City of Norwich, to Swaffham, in the County of Norfolk; and from Halfpenny Bridge, in Honingham, to the Bounds of Yaxham; and also a Lane, called Hangman's Lane, near the Gates of the said City. (Repealed by Norwich and Swaffham Road Act 1835 (5 & 6 Will. 4. c. xl))
Suffolk Roads (No. 2) Act 1770 (repealed)	10 Geo. 3. c. 68	29 March 1770
An Act for continuing the Terms and en larging the Powers of several Acts of Parliament made for repairing the Road from Ipswich to Cleydon, and several other Roads therein mentioned, in the County of Suffolk. (Repealed by Ipswich and Yaxley Roads Act 1793 (33 Geo. 3. c. 128))
Warwick Roads (No. 2) Act 1770 (repealed)	10 Geo. 3. c. 69	29 March 1770
An Act to enlarge the Term and Powers of an Act, of the Eighteenth Year of the Reign of King George the Second, (Note: Warwickshire Roads Act 1744 (18 Geo. 2. c. 19)) for repairing the Road from Birmingham, in the County of Warwick, (through Elmdon), to a Lane leading by the End of Stone bridge, in the said County. (Repealed by Birmingham and Stonebridge Road Act 1832 (2 & 3 Will. 4. c. xxxiii))
Warrington and Wigan Road Act 1770 (repealed)	10 Geo. 3. c. 70	29 March 1770
An Act to enlarge the Term contained in Two several Acts of Parliament, and to grant a further Term and Powers for the more effectual repairing, widening, and amending, the Road from a Place called Earl's Kill, in Warrington, to the Toll Bars in Wallgate in Wigan, both in the County of Lancaster. (Repealed by Warrington and Wigan Road Act 1813 (53 Geo. 3. c. cxxxi) and Warrington and Wigan Road (Lancashire) Act 1833 (3 & 4 Will. 4. c. lxxiv))
Middlesex and Hertford Roads Act 1770 (repealed)	10 Geo. 3. c. 71	29 March 1770
An Act to continue Two Acts, of the Third (Note: Middlesex and Hertford Roads Act 1729 (3 Geo. 2. c. 10)) and Seventeenth (Note: Middlesex and Hertford Roads Act 1743 (17 Geo. 2. c. 14)) Years of the Reign of King George the Second, for repairing the Road leading from Galley Corner, adjoining to Enfield Chase, in the Parish of South Mims, in the County of Middlesex, to Lemsford Mill, in the County of Hertford. (Repealed by Enfield Chase Road Act 1831 (1 Will. 4. c. lx))
Bicester and Aylesbury Road Act 1770 (repealed)	10 Geo. 3. c. 72	29 March 1770
An Act for repairing and widening the Road from Bicester, in the County of Oxford, to Aylesbury, in the County of Bucks. (Repealed by Bicester and Aylesbury Road Act 1813 (53 Geo. 3. c. cxcix) and Bicester and Aylesbury Road Act 1833 (3 & 4 Will. 4. c. xxiv))
Exeter Roads Act 1770 (repealed)	10 Geo. 3. c. 73	29 March 1770
An Act to empower the Justices of the Peace for the County of Devon to apply a Sum of Money out of the County Stock, for the opening, making, and maintaining, a convenient and commodious Highway from the High Street, in the City of Exeter, to the Castle of Exeter. (Repealed by Exeter Roads, etc. Act 1773 (13 Geo. 3. c. 109))
Gloucester Roads Act 1770 (repealed)	10 Geo. 3. c. 74	29 March 1770
An Act to enlarge the Term and Powers of an Act, made in the Twentieth Year of His late Majesty, (Note: Gloucester Roads Act 1746 (20 Geo. 2. c. 23)) for repairing the Road from Cirencester, in the County of Gloucester, to Birdlip Hill, in the said County. (Repealed by Cirencester Roads Act 1825 (6 Geo. 4. c. cxliii))
St. Martin in the Fields (Poor Relief) Act 1770 (repealed)	10 Geo. 3. c. 75	29 March 1770
An Act for building a Workhouse in the Parish of Saint Martin in the Fields, within the Liberty of Westminster, in the County of Middlesex. (Repealed by London Government (City of Westminster) Order in Council 1901 (SR&O 1901/278))
Surrey and Sussex Roads Act 1770 (repealed)	10 Geo. 3. c. 76	29 March 1770
An Act for repairing, widening, and keeping in Repair, the Road from New Chappell, in the County of Surry, over Copthorn, in the County of Sussex, through Lindfield, to the Town of Ditchling, up to the Top of Ditchling Bost Hills, in the said County of Sussex. (Repealed by Road from New Chappel to Brighton Act 1830 (11 Geo. 4 & 1 Will. 4. c. xviii))
Norwich and Watton Road Act 1770 (repealed)	10 Geo. 3. c. 77	29 March 1770
An Act for amending and widening the Road from Saint Stephen's Gate, in the County of the City of Norwich, to the Windmill in the Town of Watton, in the County of Norfolk. (Repealed by Norwich and Watton Road Act 1833 (3 & 4 Will. 4. c. xv))
Stoke Ferry Roads Act 1770 (repealed)	10 Geo. 3. c. 78	12 April 1770
An Act for amending and widening several Roads leading from the Bell (Note: The Bell Inn, now the Blue Bell, Lynn Road, Stoke Ferry, Norfolk. 52°34′24″N 0°30′37″E) in Stoke Ferry, in the County of Norfolk. (Repealed by Stoke Ferry Roads (Norfolk) Act 1832 (2 & 3 Will. 4. c. lxxxiii))
Holborn (Poor Relief) Act 1770 (repealed)	10 Geo. 3. c. 79	12 April 1770
An Act to enable the Parishioners of Saint Andrew Holborn, London, to purchase a Work-house. (Repealed by Statute Law (Repeals) Act 2008 (c. 12))
Holborn (Poor Relief) (No. 2) Act 1770 (repealed)	10 Geo. 3. c. 80	12 April 1770
An Act for building a Workhouse for the Liberty of Saffron Hill, Hatton Garden, and Ely Rents, in the Parish of Saint Andrew Holborn, in the County of Middlesex. (Repealed by Statute Law (Repeals) Act 2008 (c. 12))
New Sarum (Poor Relief) Act 1770 (repealed)	10 Geo. 3. c. 81	12 April 1770
An Act for consolidating the Rates to be made for the Relief of the Poor of the respective Parishes of Saint Thomas, Saint Edmund, and Saint Martin, in the City of New Sarum. (Repealed by Salisbury Poor Relief Act 1868 (31 & 32 Vict. c. cl) (Note: Incorrectly cited as "31 & 32 Vict. c. clx" in the Chronological Table of the Statutes.))
Surrey and Sussex Roads (No. 2) Act 1770 (repealed)	10 Geo. 3. c. 82	12 April 1770
An Act to explain, amend, and render more effectual, and to enlarge the Term and Powers granted by an Act, passed in the Twenty-second Year of the Reign of His late Majesty King George the Second, (Note: Surrey and Sussex Roads Act 1748 (22 Geo. 2. c. 35)) so far as the said Act relates to the repairing and widening the Road from Hindhead Heath, in the County of Surry, Through Fernhurst Lane and Midhurst, to the City of Chichester, in the County of Sussex; and also for repairing and widening the Road from Chichester aforesaid to Delkey, in the said County. (Repealed by Statute Law (Repeals) Act 2013 (c. 2))
Bedford and Hunts Roads Act 1770 (repealed)	10 Geo. 3. c. 83	12 April 1770
An Act to continue and render more effectual, several Acts for repairing and amending the Road from Biggleswade, in the County of Bedford, through Bugden and Alconbury, to the Top of Alconbury Hill, and from Bugden to Huntingdon, and from Cross Hall to Great Stoughton Common, in the County of Huntingdon, and for repairing, widening, turning, and altering the Road leading out of the aforesaid Road, at or near the Ferry House in the Parish of Tempsford, to and through Little Barford, Eynesbury, and Saint Neots, to the Turnpike Road at the End of Cross Hall Lane. (Repealed by Biggleswade and Alconbury Hill Road Act 1816 (56 Geo. 3. c. lii))
Surrey and Sussex Roads (No. 3) Act 1770 (repealed)	10 Geo. 3. c. 84	12 April 1770
An Act for enlarging the Term granted by an Act of the Twenty-eighth Year of His late Majesty's Reign, (Note: Sutton and Reigate Road Act 1755 (28 Geo. 2. c. 28)) "for repairing and widening the Road from Sutton, in the County of Surrey, through the Borough of Reigate by Sidlow Mill to Povey Cross, and from Sutton aforesaid through Cheam, and over Howell Hill, to Ewell; and also the Road from Tadworth by the Windmill to the Bottom of Pebble Hill, in the said County;" and for empowering the Trustees appointed by an Act of the Tenth Year of His late Majesty King George the First, (Note: Surrey and Sussex Roads Act 1723 (10 Geo. 1. c. 13)) for repairing several Roads in the Counties of Surry and Sussex, to make a yearly Allowance to the Trustees appointed by the said Act of the Twenty-eighth of George the Second; and for taking certain Roads out of the Power of the Trustees appointed by the said Act of the Tenth of George the First, and putting them under the Direction of the Trustees appointed by the said Act of the Twenty-eighth of George the Second; and for repairing the Road from Povey Cross, in the County of Surrey, to the Oak dividing the Counties of Surrey and Suffix, and also the Road from Woodhatch to Peteridge Lane, in the County of Surrey. (Repealed by Sutton (Surrey), Reigate and Povey Cross Road Act 1815 (55 Geo. 3. c. xlviii))
Norfolk Roads (No. 2) Act 1770 (repealed)	10 Geo. 3. c. 85	12 April 1770
An Act for repairing and widening the several Roads from the South Gate, in the Borough of King's Lynn, into the Parishes of East Walton, Narborough, Stoke Ferry, and Downham Market, in the County of Norfolk. (Repealed by King's Lynn Roads Act 1831 (1 & 2 Will. 4. c. xx))
Norfolk Roads (No. 3) Act 1770 (repealed)	10 Geo. 3. c. 86	12 April 1770
An Act for repairing and widening the Roads from the East Gate, in the Borough of King's Lynn, into the Parishes of Geyton and Grimstone, and to the Gate next Hillington on Congham Common, and to the North End of Babingley Lane, in the County of Norfolk. (Repealed by King's Lynn and Castle Rising Roads Act 1831 (1 & 2 Will. 4. c. xxi))
Cornwall and Devon Roads Act 1770 (repealed)	10 Geo. 3. c. 87	12 April 1770
An Act to enlarge the Term and Powers granted by an Act, passed in the First Year of the Reign of His present Majesty, (Note: Cornwall and Devon Roads Act 1760 (1 Geo. 3. c. 25)) "for repairing and widening the Road from the East End of West Tap-house Lane to the Borough of Liskeard; and from thence to Coomb Row House; and also the Road from the said Borough of Liskeard to Craft Hole, and from thence to Crimble Passage and Far Point, and from Craft Hole aforesaid, to Saint Germans Beacon, in the Counties of Cornwall and Devon;" and for amending the Roads from Barn Street to Duloe Chunk, and from Lux Street to Crathick Ford, and from Bull Post to Treworgey Cross, in the County of Cornwall. (Repealed by Liskeard Roads Act 1823 (4 Geo. 4. c. lii))
Whitchurch to Aldermaston Road Act 1770 (repealed)	10 Geo. 3. c. 88	12 April 1770
An Act for repairing and widening the Road from Whitchurch, (Note: Whitchurch, Hampshire.) in the County of Southampton, to the Turnpike Road at Aldermaston Great Bridge, (Note: Aldermaston Bridge, carrying the A340 Basingstoke Road over the River Kennet, between Aldermaston and Aldermaston Wharf, Berkshire. 51°23′29″N 1°08′58″W) in the County of Berks. (Repealed by Whitchurch (Hampshire) and Aldermaston Road Act 1833 (3 & 4 Will. 4. c. lxxvii))
Chester and Lancaster Roads Act 1770 (repealed)	10 Geo. 3. c. 89	12 April 1770
An Act to enlarge the Term and Powers of an Act, made in the Fifth Year of His present Majesty, (Note: Chester, Lancaster and Yorks Roads Act 1765 (5 Geo. 3. c. 100)) for repairing and widening the Road from Stockport, in the County of Chester, to Saxon's Lane End, in the County of Lancaster, and other Roads in the said Act mentioned. (Repealed by Stockport and Saxon's Lane End Road Act 1804 (44 Geo. 3. c. xxiv))
Dunchurch to Stone Bridge Road Act 1770 (repealed)	10 Geo. 3. c. 90	29 March 1770
An Act to continue, amend, and render more effectual, the several Acts now subsisting for repairing the Road from Dunchurch to Stone Bridge, in the County of Warwick. (Repealed by Road from Dunchurch to Stonebridge Act 1824 (5 Geo. 4. c. xliii))
Hereford Roads Act 1770 (repealed)	10 Geo. 3. c. 91	12 April 1770
An Act for enlarging the Term and Powers of an Act, passed in the Twenty-fifth Year of the Reign of His late Majesty, (Note: Hereford Roads Act 1751 (25 Geo. 2. c. 56)) for repairing the several Roads leading from the Town of Bromyard, in the County of Hereford, therein mentioned; and for amending several other Roads adjoining thereto. (Repealed by Hereford Roads Act 1791 (31 Geo. 3. c. 130))
Nottingham Roads Act 1770 (repealed)	10 Geo. 3. c. 92	12 April 1770
An Act for repairing and widening the Road from Worksop to the Turnpike Road at Kelham, and from Debdale Hill to the Great Northern Road at South Muskham, in the County of Nottingham. (Repealed by Worksop and Kelham, and Debdale Hill and South Muskham Roads Act 1839 (2 & 3 Vict. c. xv))
Hamilton Bridge Act 1770	10 Geo. 3. c. 93	12 April 1770
An Act for building a Bridge over the River Clyde, near the Town of Hamilton, in the County of Lanark, and for making and repairing certain Roads and Avenues leading to the same.
Wellesbourne Mountfort and Stratford-upon-Avon Road Act 1770 (repealed)	10 Geo. 3. c. 94	12 April 1770
An Act for amending the Road from Wells-bourn Mountfort to Stratford upon Avon, in the County of Warwick. (Repealed by Wellesbourne Mountford and Stratford-upon-Avon Road Act 1833 (3 & 4 Will. 4. c. xvi))
Roads from Brighton to Lovell Heath Act 1770 (repealed)	10 Geo. 3. c. 95	12 April 1770
An Act for repairing and widening the Roads leading from Brighthelmston to The County Oak on Lovell Heath, in the County of Sussex. (Repealed by Roads from Brighton and from Austy Cross Act 1825 (6 Geo. 4. c. xxxix))
Suffolk and Cambridge Roads Act 1770 (repealed)	10 Geo. 3. c. 96	12 April 1770
An Act for repairing and widening the Roads from the Borough of Bury Saint Edmunds to the Town of Newmarket, in the Counties of Suffolk and Cambridge; and from the South End of The Ferry Street in Brandon to Bury Saint Edmunds, in the said County of Suffolk. (Repealed by Roads from Bury St. Edmunds to Newmarket and to Brandon Act 1833 (3 & 4 Will. 4. c. xcviii))
Cambridge and Norfolk Roads Act 1770 (repealed)	10 Geo. 3. c. 97	12 April 1770
An Act to extend the Provisions in Two Acts, passed in the Third (Note: Cambridge and Ely Roads Act 1763 (3 Geo. 3. c. 36)) and Fifth (Note: Cambridge Roads (No. 2) Act 1765 (5 Geo. 3. c. 79)) Years of His present Majesty, for repairing the Road from Cambridge to Ely, and from Ely to Littleport, and other Roads therein mentioned, to the Road from Witburton to Mepall; and for making other Provisions for repairing the said Road from Ely to Littleport; and for making and keeping in Repair a Road from Littleport to Chequer Corner in Downham, in the Counties of Cambridge and Norfolk. (Repealed by Cambridge to Downham Road Act 1804 (44 Geo. 3. c. lxx) and Cambridge and Ely Roads Act 1824 (5 Geo. 4. c. lx))
Chester and Derby Roads Act 1770 (repealed)	10 Geo. 3. c. 98	12 April 1770
An Act for repairing, widening, and altering, the Road from Macclesfield, in the County of Chester, to the Turnpike Road at Randle Carr Lane Head in Femille, in the County of Derby, leading to Chapel in the Frith, in the same County. (Repealed by Hurdsfield and Chapel-en-le-Frith Road (Derbyshire) Act 1833 (3 & 4 Will. 4. c. lix))
Tamworth Roads Act 1770 (repealed)	10 Geo. 3. c. 99	12 April 1770
An Act for repairing and widening several Roads leading to and through the Borough of Tamworth, and other Roads, therein mentioned, in the Counties of Stafford, Warwick, and Derby. (Repealed by Tamworth Roads Act 1832 (2 & 3 Will. 4. c. li))
Berks and Wilts Roads Act 1770 (repealed)	10 Geo. 3. c. 100	12 April 1770
An Act to continue the Term and to vary and enlarge the Powers of Two Acts of the Twelfth Year of the Reign of King George the First, (Note: Newbury to Marlborough Road Act 1725 (12 Geo. 1. c. 8)) and the Eighteenth Year of the Reign of His late Majesty, (Note: Newbury and Marlborough Roads Act 1744 (18 Geo. 2. c. 12)) for repairing the Highways from Speenhamland, in the County of Berks, to Marlborough, in the County of Wilts; and for repairing several other Roads therein mentioned. (Repealed by Speenhamland Roads Act 1816 (56 Geo. 3. c. lxxx), Speenhamland and Marlborough Road Act 1827 (7 & 8 Geo. 4. c. lii) and Annual Turnpike Acts Continuance Act 1876 (39 & 40 Vict. c. 39))
Oxford, Gloucester and Notts Roads Act 1770 (repealed)	10 Geo. 3. c. 101	12 April 1770
An Act for repairing and widening the Road from Burford to Banbury in the County of Oxford; and from Burford aforesaid to the Turnpike Road leading to Stow, in the County of Gloucester, at the Bottom of Stow Hill; and from Swerford Gate, in the said County of Oxford, to the Turnpike Road in Aynho, in the County of Northampton. (Repealed by Burford and Banbury, Burford and Stow, and Swerford Gate and Aynho Roads Act 1810 (50 Geo. 3. c. ccx))
Trent and Mersey Canal Act 1770 (repealed)	10 Geo. 3. c. 102	12 April 1770
An Act to amend an Act, made in the Sixth Year of the Reign of His present Majesty (Note: Trent and Mersey Canal Act 1766 (6 Geo. 3. c. 96)) for making a navigable Cut or Canal from the River Trent, at or near Wilden Ferry, in the County of Derby, to the River Mersey, at or near Runcorn Gap; and for granting further Powers for that Purpose. (Repealed by Trent and Mersey Canal Act 1831 (1 Will. 4. c. lv))
Severn and Trent Canal Act 1770	10 Geo. 3. c. 103	12 April 1770
An Act to explain and amend an Act, made in the Sixth Year of the Reign of His present Majesty, intituled, "An Act for making and maintaining a navigable Cut or Canal from the River Severn, between Bewdley and Titton Brook, in the County of Worcester, to cross the River Trent at or near Heywood Mill, in the County of Stafford, and to communicate with a Canal intended to be made between the said River Trent and the River Mersey;" and for granting further Powers for that Purpose.
River Clyde Navigation Act 1770 (repealed)	10 Geo. 3. c. 104	12 April 1770
An Act to explain and amend an Act, made in the Thirty-second Year of the Reign of King George the Second, (Note: Clyde Bridge Act 1758 (32 Geo. 2. c. 62)) for improving the Navigation of the River Clyde to the City of Glasgow, and for building a Bridge cross the said River from the said City to the Village of Gorbells. (Repealed by Clyde Navigation Consolidation Act 1858 (21 & 22 Vict. c. cxlix))
Monkland Canal Act 1770 or the Monkland, Glasgow Navigation etc. Act 1770	10 Geo. 3. c. 105	12 April 1770
An Act for making and maintaining a navigable Cut or Canal and Waggon Way from the Collieries, in the Parishes of Old and New Monk-land, to the City of Glasgow.
Monmouth Roads Act 1770 (repealed)	10 Geo. 3. c. 106	19 May 1770
An Act to continue the Term, and alter and enlarge the Powers of an Act, made in the Thirty-first Year of His late Majesty, (Note: Monmouth and Gloucester Roads Act 1757 (31 Geo. 2. c. 44)) for repairing the Road from the Village of Magor to the Bridge Foot in the Town of Chepstow, in the County of Monmouth, and other Roads in the Counties of Monmouth and Gloucester; and for repairing and widening several other Roads adjoining to the said Roads. (Repealed by Magor and Chepstow Road Act 1800 (39 & 40 Geo. 3. c. xv))
Herts and Middlesex Roads Act 1770 (repealed)	10 Geo. 3. c. 107	19 May 1770
An Act to continue the Term, and alter and enlarge the Powers of Three Acts, (Note: Hertford and Middlesex Highways Act 1715 (1 Geo. 1. St. 2. c. 12 Pr.)) (Note: Hertfordshire and Middlesex Roads Act 1734 (8 Geo. 2. c. 9)) (Note: Hertfordshire and Middlesex Roads Act 1750 (24 Geo. 2. c. 10)) for repairing the Highways through the several Parishes of Saint Michael, Saint Alban, Saint Peter, Shenley Ridge, and South Mimms, in the Counties of Hertford and Middlesex. (Repealed by Hertford and Middlesex Roads Act 1791 (31 Geo. 3. c. 108))
Kent and Sussex Roads Act 1770 (repealed)	10 Geo. 3. c. 108	19 May 1770
An Act for continuing, amending, and rendering more effectual, so much of Three Acts of Parliament (Note: Sevenoaks and Tunbridge Highways Act 1709 (8 Ann. c. 20)) (Note: Kent Roads (No. 2) Act 1724 (11 Geo. 1. c. 15)) (Note: Kent and Sussex Roads Act 1740 (14 Geo. 2. c. 12)) for repairing the Roads from Sevenoakes, Tunbridge Wells, and Kipping's Cross, to Lamberhurst Pound and Pullins-Hill, in the County of Kent, and to Flimwell-Vent, in the County of Sussex as relates to the Road leading from Sevenoakes Common to Woodsgate, Tunbridge Wells, and Kipping-Cross, in the said County of Kent. (Repealed by Sevenoaks and Tunbridge Wells Roads Act 1814 (54 Geo. 3. c. clxxiv))
Louth Roads Act 1770 (repealed)	10 Geo. 3. c. 109	19 May 1770
An Act for repairing and widening several Roads leading from the Town of Louth, in the County of Lincoln. (Repealed by Roads from Saltfleet to Lincoln Act 1830 (11 Geo. 4 & 1 Will. 4. c. ciii))
St. Clement Danes (Poor Relief) Act 1770 (repealed)	10 Geo. 3. c. 110	19 May 1770
An Act to explain, amend, and render more effectual, an Act, made in the Fourth Year of the Reign of His present Majesty, (Note: St. Clement Danes (Poor Relief, etc.) Act 1764 (4 Geo. 3. c. 55)) for maintaining, regulating, and employing the Poor of the Parish of Saint Clement Danes, in the Liberty of Westminster, and County of Middlesex. (Repealed by London Government (City of Westminster) Order in Council 1901 (SR&O 1901/278))
River Ure Navigation Act 1770	10 Geo. 3. c. 111	19 May 1770
An Act for completing the Navigation of the River Swale, from its Junction with the River Ure to Morton Bridge, and of Bedale Brook, in the County of York; and for repealing Part of an Act, made in the Seventh Year of His present Majesty's Reign, (Note: River Ure Navigation Act 1766 (7 Geo. 3. c. 93)) relating thereto.
Parish Church of St. Marylebone Act 1770 (repealed)	10 Geo. 3. c. 112	19 May 1770
An Act for building a new Parish Church, and declaring the present Parish Church, a Chapel; for making a Cemetery or Church Yard; and for building an House for the Use of the Minister of the Parish of Saint Mary le bone, in the County of Middlesex. (Repealed by St. Marylebone Parish Church and Chapels Act 1811 (51 Geo. 3. c. cli))
Stafford Roads Act 1770 (repealed)	10 Geo. 3. c. 113	19 May 1770
An Act for repairing, widening, turning, and altering the Roads from Butterton Moor End, (Note: Butterton Moor End, Onecote, Staffordshire. 53°05′50″N 1°55′22″W) near Oncott, in the County of Stafford, to the Three Mile Stone in the Turnpike Road (Note: The A515 road between Buxton and Ashbourne, Derbyshire. 53°13′32″N 1°52′21″W) leading from Buxton to Ashborne, in the County of Derby; and from Blackton Moor, in the County of Stafford, to the Turnpike Road (Note: The A515 road between Buxton and Ashbourne, north of Newhaven, Derbyshire. 53°08′51″N 1°45′53″W) leading from Buxton to Ashbourne, near Newhaven, in the County of Derby; and from Warslow (Note: Warslow, Staffordshire. 53°07′33″N 1°52′05″W) to Ecton Mine, (Note: Ecton Mine, Ecton, Staffordshire. 53°07′21″N 1°51′30″W) in the County of Stafford. (Repealed by Butterton Moor End and Buxton and Ashbourne Turnpike Road Act 1833 (3 & 4 Will. 4. c. xcvii))
Leeds and Liverpool Canal Act 1770	10 Geo. 3. c. 114	19 May 1770
An Act for making and maintaining a navigable Cut or Canal from Leeds Bridge, in the County of York, to The North Lady's Walk in Liverpool, in the County Palatine of Lancaster; and from thence to the River Mersey.

=== Private acts ===
Short title	Citation	Royal assent
Long title
Sackville's Name Act 1770	10 Geo. 3. c. 1 Pr.	16 February 1770
An Act to enable the Right Honourable George Sackville, commonly called Lord George Sackville and his Issue Male, to take and use the Surname of Germain, pursuant to the Will of the Right Honourable the Lady Elizabeth Germain deceased.
Schneider's Naturalization Act 1770	10 Geo. 3. c. 2 Pr.	16 February 1770
An Act for naturalizing John Caspar Schneider.
Kroll's Naturalization Act 1770	10 Geo. 3. c. 3 Pr.	16 February 1770
An Act for naturalizing Adam Kroll.
Cailler's Naturalization Act 1770	10 Geo. 3. c. 4 Pr.	16 February 1770
An Act for naturalizing John Daniel Cailler.
Bishop of Bristol's Estate Act 1770	10 Geo. 3. c. 5 Pr.	16 March 1770
An Act to enable the Bishop of Bristol to grant a Lease or Leases of a Close of Ground, commonly called The Bishop's Park, in the Parish of Saint Augustine, otherwise called Saint Augustine the Less, within the City of Bristol, or the Suburbs thereof.
Halloughton Inclosure Act 1770	10 Geo. 3. c. 6 Pr.	16 March 1770
An Act for dividing, enclosing, and allotting, the Open Fields, and certain Commonable Places, in the Parish of Halloughton, in the County of Leicester.
Ratby Inclosure Act 1770	10 Geo. 3. c. 7 Pr.	16 March 1770
An Act for dividing, enclosing, and allotting, the Open Fields in Ratby, in the Parish of Ratby and County of Leicester.
Waddington Inclosure Act 1770	10 Geo. 3. c. 8 Pr.	16 March 1770
An Act for dividing and enclosing the Open Fields, Common Meadows, Common Pastures, Commons, and Waste Grounds, in the Parish of Waddington, in the County of the City of Lincoln.
Saddington Inclosure Act 1770	10 Geo. 3. c. 9 Pr.	16 March 1770
An Act for dividing, allotting, and enclosing, the Open Fields, and Commonable Places, in the Parish of Saddington, in the County of Leicester.
Scawby Inclosure Act 1770	10 Geo. 3. c. 10 Pr.	16 March 1770
An Act for dividing and enclosing certain Open Fields, and. Common Pastures, in the Parish of Scawby, in the County of Lincoln.
Brampton Inclosure Act 1770	10 Geo. 3. c. 11 Pr.	16 March 1770
An Act for dividing and enclosing the Open Commons, within the Manor or Lordship of Brampton, in the Parish of Longmarston, in the County of Westmorland.
East and West Cranmore (Somerset) Inclosure Act 1770	10 Geo. 3. c. 12 Pr.	16 March 1770
An Act for dividing and enclosing an Open Common or Tract of Ground, Parcel of Mendip, in the Parishes of East Cranmore and West Cranmore, in the County of Somerset.
Derby Hills in Castle Donington (Leicestershire, Derbyshire) Inclosure Act 1770	10 Geo. 3. c. 13 Pr.	16 March 1770
An Act for dividing and enclosing a certain Common or Waste Ground called Derby Hills, in the County of Derby, Parcel of the Manor of Castle Donington, in the Counties of Leicester and Derby.
Blackbourton Inclosure Act 1770	10 Geo. 3. c. 14 Pr.	16 March 1770
An Act for dividing and enclosing certain Open and Common Fields, Common Pastures, Common Meadows, and Commonable Grounds, in the Parish of Blackbourton, in the County of Oxford.
Backwell's Name Act 1770	10 Geo. 3. c. 15 Pr.	16 March 1770
An Act to enable William Harwood and his Issue to take and use the Surname and Arms of Backwell, pursuant to the Will of William Backwell deceased.
James' Name Act 1770	10 Geo. 3. c. 16 Pr.	16 March 1770
An Act to enable William Head Esquire, a Minor, and his Issue, to take and use the Surname of James only, and to bear the Coat Armour of the Family of John James Esquire deceased.
Schuster's Naturalization Act 1770	10 Geo. 3. c. 17 Pr.	16 March 1770
An Act for naturalizing Christian Gottlieb Schuster.
Jacquin's Naturalization Act 1770	10 Geo. 3. c. 18 Pr.	16 March 1770
An Act for naturalizing John Nicholas Jacquin.
Angerstein's Naturalization Act 1770	10 Geo. 3. c. 19 Pr.	16 March 1770
An Act for naturalizing John Julius Angerstein.
John Walker's Estate Act 1770	10 Geo. 3. c. 20 Pr.	29 March 1770
An Act for vesting the Manor of Lymington, and certain Lands and Hereditaments in the Counties of Somerset and Wilts, settled by the Will of John Walker Esquire deceased, in Trustees, to be sold, and for settling other Lands and Hereditaments in the said County of Wilts, in Lieu thereof, and for other Purposes therein mentioned.
Caldicot's Estate Act 1770	10 Geo. 3. c. 21 Pr.	29 March 1770
An Act for discharging certain Estates from the Uses and Trusts thereof, created in and by an Act of Parliament, passed in the Twenty-eighth Year of His late Majesty's Reign, intituled, "An Act for charging the Settled and Unsettled Estates of Gilbert Caldecot Esquire, with raising Money to pay his Debts and Incumbrances, and for limiting his Unsettled Estates, so charged, to the Uses of his Marriage Settlement;" (Note: Caldicot's Estate Act 1755 (28 Geo. 2. c. 48 Pr.)) and for charging the said Estates to the several Uses and Trusts therein mentioned.
Benniworth Inclosure Act 1770	10 Geo. 3. c. 22 Pr.	29 March 1770
An Act for dividing and enclosing certain Open and Common Fields and Grounds, within the Parish of Benniworth, in the County of Lincoln.
Navenby Inclosure Act 1770	10 Geo. 3. c. 23 Pr.	29 March 1770
An Act for dividing and enclosing the Open and Common Fields, Commonable Lands, and Waste Grounds, within the Manor and Parish of Navenby, in the County of Lincoln.
Uppingham Inclosure Act 1770	10 Geo. 3. c. 24 Pr.	29 March 1770
An Act for dividing and enclosing Part of the Common Fields in the Parish of Uppingham, in the County of Rutland.
Winterton Inclosure Act 1770	10 Geo. 3. c. 25 Pr.	29 March 1770
An Act for dividing and enclosing certain Open Lands, Grounds, and Common Pastures, in the Parish of Winterton, in the County of Lincoln.
Thornton Inclosure Act 1770	10 Geo. 3. c. 26 Pr.	29 March 1770
An Act for dividing and enclosing the Common and Waste Grounds, within the Township and Manor of Thornton, in Bradford Dale, in the West Riding of the County of York.
Compton Inclosure Act 1770	10 Geo. 3. c. 27 Pr.	29 March 1770
An Act for dividing and enclosing the Open Fields, Downs, Meadows, and Waste Lands, within the Manor or Manors of Compton, in the Parish of Enford, in the County of Wilts.
Bassenthwaite Inclosure Act 1770	10 Geo. 3. c. 28 Pr.	29 March 1770
An Act for dividing and enclosing the Common and Waste Grounds within the Manor or Parish of Bassenthwaite, in the County of Cumberland.
Denton Inclosure Act 1770	10 Geo. 3. c. 29 Pr.	29 March 1770
An Act for dividing and enclosing the several Open Fields, Copses, and Commonable Ground, within the Parish of Denton, otherwise Divington Parva, in the County of Northampton.
Wyvill Heath Inclosure Act 1770	10 Geo. 3. c. 30 Pr.	29 March 1770
An Act for dividing and enclosing Wyvill Heath, in the Lordship of Wyvill cum Hungerton, in the County of Lincoln.
Dunnington Moor Inclosure Act 1770	10 Geo. 3. c. 31 Pr.	29 March 1770
An Act for dividing and enclosing a certain Parcel of Open Ground called Dunnington Moor, in the East Riding of the County of York.
West Heslerton and Yeddingham (Yorkshire, East Riding) Inclosure Act 1770	10 Geo. 3. c. 32 Pr.	29 March 1770
An Act for dividing and enclosing the Common Fields, Common Pasture, and other unenclosed Grounds, within the Township of West Heslerton and Parish of Yeddingham, in the East Riding of the County of York.
Bottesford including Easthorpe and Normanton (Leicestershire) Inclosure Act 1770	10 Geo. 3. c. 33 Pr.	29 March 1770
An Act for dividing and enclosing the Open Fields, Meadows, Common Pastures, and other Commonable Lands, within the Parish of Bottesford, including the Hamlets of Easthorpe and Normanton, in the County of Leicester.
Bellerby Inclosure Act 1770	10 Geo. 3. c. 34 Pr.	29 March 1770
An Act for dividing and enclosing Two Common Stinted Pastures, and a certain Moor or Common, within the Manor of Bellerby, in the North Riding of the County of York.
Earswick Inclosure Act 1770	10 Geo. 3. c. 35 Pr.	29 March 1770
An Act for dividing and enclosing a Parcel of Open Ground in the Township of Earswick, in the County of York.
Ravenstone Inclosure Act 1770	10 Geo. 3. c. 36 Pr.	29 March 1770
An Act for dividing and enclosing the Open Fields, Meadows, and Waste Ground, in the Lordship or Liberty of Ravenstone, otherwise Raunston, in the Counties of Leicester and Derby.
Westwell Inclosure Act 1770	10 Geo. 3. c. 37 Pr.	29 March 1770
An Act for dividing and enclosing the Open and Common Fields, Lands, and Downs, within tile Manor and Parish of Westwell, in the County of Oxford.
Bulkington Inclosure Act 1770	10 Geo. 3. c. 38 Pr.	29 March 1770
An Act for dividing and enclosing several Common Fields and Commonable Lands, within the Parish of Bulkington, in the County of Warwick.
Sherburn, Lennerton, Barkston Ash, Church Fenton, Little Fenton, and Biggin (Yorkshire) inclosures.	10 Geo. 3. c. 39 Pr.	29 March 1770
An Act for dividing and enclosing the Open Parts of the Common Arable Fields, and the Common Meadows, Pasture Grounds, Commons, and Waste Grounds, within the Townships of Sherburn, Lennerton, Barkston Ash, Church Fenton, Little Penton, and Biggin, in the County of York.
Holland Fen Inclosure (Amendment) Act 1770	10 Geo. 3. c. 40 Pr.	29 March 1770
An Act for amending and rendering more effectual an Act, made in the Seventh Year of His present Majesty's Reign, intituled, "An Act for dividing a certain Fen called The Haute Huntre, Eight Hundred, or Holand Fen, and certain other Commonable Places adjoining thereto, in the Parts of Holland, in the County of Lincoln." (Note: Holland Fen (Lincolnshire) Division Act 1767 (7 Geo. 3. c. 112 Pr.))
Black Sluice Drainage Act 1770	10 Geo. 3. c. 41 Pr.	29 March 1770
An Act for amending and rendering more effectual an Act, made in the Fifth Year of the Reign of His present Majesty, intituled, "An Act for draining and improving certain Low Marsh and Fen Lands lying between Boston Haven and Bourne, in the Parts of Kesteven and Holland, in the County of Lincoln;" (Note: Black Sluice Drainage Act 1765 (5 Geo. 3. c. 86 Pr.)) and for improving the Navigation through the said Lands.
Simpson Inclosure Act 1770	10 Geo. 3. c. 42 Pr.	29 March 1770
An Act for dividing and enclosing the Common Fields, Common Meadows, Common Cow Pasture, Lammas Grounds, and Waste Grounds, in the Parish of Simpson, in the County of Bucks.
Appach's Naturalization Act 1770	10 Geo. 3. c. 43 Pr.	29 March 1770
An Act for naturalizing John Jacob Appach.
Hanman's Naturalization Act 1770	10 Geo. 3. c. 44 Pr.	29 March 1770
An Act for naturalizing John Gottfried Hanman.
Duke of Kingston's Estate Act 1770	10 Geo. 3. c. 45 Pr.	12 April 1770
An Act for vesting a certain Messuage or Tenement, with the Appurtenances, in Arlington Street, in the County of Middlesex, Part of the Settled Estate of the Most Noble Evelyn Duke of Kingston, in Trustees, and their Heirs, in Trust for the said Duke, and for settling other Estates of the said Duke to the same Uses as the said Messuage and Premises now stand limited.
Sale of lands settled and entailed upon John Pleydell Bouverie Viscount Folkestone and William Earl of Radnor, by the wills of Sir Mark Stuart Pleydell and Sir Edward Des Bouverie, for payment of incumbrances and settling other lands.	10 Geo. 3. c. 46 Pr.	12 April 1770
An Act for vesting several Lands and Tenements, settled and entailed upon Jacob Pleydell Bouverie, commonly called Viscount Folkestone, and William Earl of Radnor, and their Issue respectively, by the Will of Sir Mark Stuart Pleydell Baronet deceased, in Trustees, to be sold to discharge Incumbrances; and for vesting several Lands and Tenements, settled and entailed upon the said Earl and his Issue by the Will of Sir Edward Des Bouverie Baronet deceased, in Trustees, to be sold, and for settling other Lands, and Hereditaments in Lieu thereof.
Lord Milton's Estate Act 1770	10 Geo. 3. c. 47 Pr.	12 April 1770
An Act for vesting the Fee-Simple and Inheritance of certain Lands and Hereditaments in the Parish of Winterborne Clenston, in the County of Dorset, in Trustees, for the Right Honourable Joseph Lord Milton and his Heirs, discharged of the several Charitable Uses to which the same now stand limited, and in Lieu thereof to subject and charge the same, and other Lands and Hereditaments in the same County, whereof the said Joseph Lord Milton is seised in Fee, with the Payment of a Perpetual Rent Charge of greater Value; and for other Purposes.
Lord Edgecombe's Estate Act 1770	10 Geo. 3. c. 48 Pr.	12 April 1770
An Act to enable the Right Honourable Gorge Lord Edgecumbe to grant Building Leases of Lands, Tenements, and Hereditaments, within the Manor of Stonehouse, otherwise East Stonehouse, in the County of Devon.
Confirming an agreement, afterwards made an order of assize and King's Bench rule, concerning John Thorton's estate and for confirming the award made in pursuance of said agreement.	10 Geo. 3. c. 49 Pr.	12 April 1770
An Act for confirming an Agreement, afterwards made an Order of Assize and Rule of His Majesty's Court of King's Bench at Westminster, in a Cause wherein John Doe, on the Demise of William Salvin Esquire and Catherine his Wife, was Plaintiff, and Margaret Thornton and Mary Thornton Spinsters, Infants, by their Guardians, were Defendants, touching the Manor of Netherwitton, Capital Messuage of Netherwitton, and other Messuages, Lands, and Hereditaments, in the County of Northumberland, heretofore the Estate of John Thornton late of Netherwitton aforesaid Esquire deceased, and for confirming the Award made in pursuance of the said Agreement.
Robinson's Estate Act 1770	10 Geo. 3. c. 50 Pr.	12 April 1770
An Act to empower the Trustees named in the Settlement of Sir George Robinson Baronet, and Dame Dorothea his Wife, to grant Building and Repairing Leases of the Settled Estates in or near Tower Hill, within the Liberty of the Tower of London; and for other the Purposes therein mentioned.
Hulme's Estate Act 1770	10 Geo. 3. c. 51 Pr.	12 April 1770
An Act to enable the Trustees of the Estates devised by William Hulme Esquire to grant Building Leases thereof; and to encrease the Number of Exhibitioners in Brazen Nose College, Oxford, founded by the said Testator; and for other the Purposes therein mentioned.
Docksey's Estate Act 1770	10 Geo. 3. c. 52 Pr.	12 April 1770
An Act for vesting the Manor of Snelston, and certain Messuages, Lands, and Hereditaments, in Snelston, in the County of Derby, comprised in the Marriage Settlement of Thomas Dockscy Esquire, in Trustees, in Trust to sell and convey the same to Arthur Bowyer Gentleman and his Heirs, discharged from the Uses of the said Settlement, and for laying out the Money arising by such Sale in the Purchase of other Lands and Hereditaments to be settled in Lieu thereof to the same Uses.
Vesting George Rich's share and interest in £6,000 in Sir Robert Rich's executors, as part of his personal estate, pursuant to a codicil in his will made for that purpose.	10 Geo. 3. c. 53 Pr.	12 April 1770
An Act for vesting the Share and Interest of George Rich Esquire, Second Son of Sir Robert Rich Baronet deceased, of and in Six thousand Pounds, (which by the Settlement made on the Marriage of the said Sir Robert Rich with Dame Elizabeth Rich his now Widow, was secured for the Benefit of their younger Children), in the Executors of the said Sir Robert Rich, as Part of his Personal Estate, pursuant to a Codicil to his Will, made for that Purpose.
Hobart's Estate Act 1770	10 Geo. 3. c. 54 Pr.	12 April 1770
An Act for Sale of the Settled Estate of the Honourable George Hobart, in the County of Leicester, and for investing the Monies to arise from such Sale in the Purchase of other Lands, to be settled to the like Uses.
Estates of Fitzherbert and Cavendish exchange.	10 Geo. 3. c. 55 Pr.	12 April 1770
An Act for establishing and confirming an Exchange of divers Lands and Hereditaments in the Parish of Dovebridge, in the County of Derby, for other Lands and Hereditaments in the same Parish, pursuant to an Agreement between John Fitzherbert Clerk, Master of Arts, Vicar of the Vicarage and Parish Church of Devebridge, within the Diocese of Litchfield and Coventry, and Sir Henry Cavendish Baronet, by and with the Consent of the Patron of the said Vicarage and the Ordinary of the Diocese.
Bromley's Estate Act 1770	10 Geo. 3. c. 56 Pr.	12 April 1770
An Act for empowering the Guardians named in the Will of William Throckmorton Bromley Esquire deceased, to make Sale of Timber growing upon Part of his Settled Estates, and for investing the Money thereby arising in the Purchase of Lands for the Benefit of his Infant Children.
Establishing, confirming and ratifying all sales, partitions and divisions made under Sir Walter and Dame Mary Blount's and Thomas and Barbara Clifford's marriage settlements.	10 Geo. 3. c. 57 Pr.	12 April 1770
An Act for establishing, ratifying, and confirming all Sales, Partitions, and Divisions, made, or to be made by virtue of the Powers or Authorities contained in the several Marriage Settlements of Sir Walter Blount Baronet and the Honourable Dame Maty his Wife, and of the Honourable Thomas Clifford the Elder and the Honourable Barbara his Wife, and for other Purposes.
Earl of Shrewsbury's Hospital Act 1770	10 Geo. 3. c. 58 Pr.	12 April 1770
An Act to explain and amend an Act, passed in the Eleventh Year of the Reign of His Majesty King George the First, intituled, "An Act for vesting in Trustees several Lands, Tenements, and Hereditaments, in the Counties of York and Derby, for the Maintenance of the poor Persons in the Hospital of Gilbert Earl of Shrewsbury long since deceased, situate at Sheffield, in the said County of York;" (Note: Earl of Shrewsbury's Hospital Act 1724 (11 Geo. 1. c. 33 Pr.)) and for enlarging the Buildings of the said Hospital, and adding more poor Persons to those already established there in and for enlarging the Powers contained in the said Act, and for other Purposes.
Matton Inclosure Act 1770	10 Geo. 3. c. 59 Pr.	12 April 1770
An Act for dividing and enclosing certain Open Fields, Meadows, Pasture Leys, and Stinted Common Pastures, in the Township and Parish of Marion, in the County of Lincoln.
Little Stretton Inclosure Act 1770	10 Geo. 3. c. 60 Pr.	12 April 1770
An Act for dividing and enclosing the Open and Common Fields of Little Stretton, in the Parish of Norton, and County of Lincoln.
Stoke Goldington Inclosure Act 1770	10 Geo. 3. c. 61 Pr.	12 April 1770
An Act for dividing and enclosing the Open and Common Fields, Meadows, Pastures, and Commonable Lands and Grounds, within the Liberties of Stoke Goldington, in the County of Bucks.
Souldrop Inclosure Act 1770	10 Geo. 3. c. 62 Pr.	12 April 1770
An Act for dividing and enclosing certain Open and Common Fields, Commonable Lands, and Waste Grounds, within the Manor and Parish of Souldrop, in the County of Bedford.
Normanton upon Soar Inclosure Act 1770	10 Geo. 3. c. 63 Pr.	12 April 1770
An Act for dividing and enclosing the Open Fields, Meadows, Common Pasture, and all other Open, Common, and Waste Lands, in the Parish of Normanton upon Soar, in the County of Nottingham.
St. Neots Inclosure Act 1770	10 Geo. 3. c. 64 Pr.	12 April 1770
An Act for dividing and enclosing the Open and Common Fields, Common Pastures, and other Commonable Lands and Grounds, within the Parish of Saint Neots, in the County of Huntingdon.
Abington Pigotts of Abington in the Clay (Cambridgeshire) Inclosure Act 1770	10 Geo. 3. c. 65 Pr.	12 April 1770
An Act for dividing and enclosing the Common Fields, and other Commonable Lands and Grounds, within the Manor and Parish of Abington Pigotts, otherwise Abington in the Clay, in the County of Cambridge.
Aulcester Inclosure Act 1770	10 Geo. 3. c. 66 Pr.	12 April 1770
An Act for dividing, allotting, and enclosing, the Open and Common Fields, and the Midsummer and Lammas, and other Commonable Meadows, Pastures, and Grounds, and the Common or Waste Ground called Aulcester Heath, within the Manor of Aulcester, in the County of Warwick.
Westborough and Doddington (Lincolnshire) Inclosure Act 1770	10 Geo. 3. c. 67 Pr.	12 April 1770
An Act for dividing and enclosing the Open Fields, Meadows, Common Pastures, and Waste Grounds, within the Townships of Westborough and Doddington, in the Parish of Westborough cum Doddington, in the County of Lincoln.
Great Useburn Inclosure Act 1770	10 Geo. 3. c. 68 Pr.	12 April 1770
An Act for dividing and enclosing certain Open Fields, Lands, and Commons, within the Township and Parish of Great Useburn, in the West Riding of the County of York.
Ashbury Inclosure Act 1770	10 Geo. 3. c. 69 Pr.	12 April 1770
An Act for dividing and enclosing the Open and Common Fields, Common Meadows, Downs, Commons, and other Commonable Lands, in the Parish of Ashbury, in the County of Berks.
Notgrove Inclosure Act 1770	10 Geo. 3. c. 70 Pr.	12 April 1770
An Act for dividing and enclosing the Open and Common Fields, Downs, and other Commonable Lands and Waste Grounds, in the Parish of Notgrove, in the County of Gloucester.
East Newton Inclosure Act 1770	10 Geo. 3. c. 71 Pr.	12 April 1770
An Act for dividing and enclosing certain Open Fields, Lands, and Grounds, within the Township of East Newton, in the Parish of Aldborough in Holdernesse, in the Count) of York.
Walworth Common Inclosure Act 1770 (repealed)	10 Geo. 3. c. 72 Pr.	12 April 1770
An Act for dividing certain Commons or Wastes in the Parish of Saint Mary Newington, commonly called Newington Butts, in the County of Surry, and disposing of the same for the Benefit of the Poor of the said Parish. (Repealed by London Government (Borough of Southwark) Order in Council 1901 (SR&O 1901/275))
Foxton Inclosure Act 1770	10 Geo. 3. c. 73 Pr.	12 April 1770
An Act for dividing, allotting, and enclosing, the Open Fields and Commonable Places in the Parish of Foxton, in the County of Leicester.
Earl of Clanricarde's Estate (Ireland) Act 1770	10 Geo. 3. c. 74 Pr.	19 May 1770
An Act for vesting the Settled Estates of John Earl of Clanricarde in the Kingdom of Ireland, in Trustees, discharged of the Uses and Trusts of his Marriage Articles, and a voluntary Settlement made by him, and for resettling the same to the several Uses, and upon the Trusts therein mentioned.
Earl of Orford's Estate Act 1770	10 Geo. 3. c. 75 Pr.	19 May 1770
An Act for vesting a Messuage in Pall Mall, and the Pictures and Furniture, thereunto belonging, in George Earl of Orford, discharged from certain Trusts created thereof and for settling Freehold Lands, in the County of Norfolk, of greater Value, in Lieu thereof, to the Uses therein mentioned.
Lock's Estate Act 1770	10 Geo. 3. c. 76 Pr.	19 May 1770
An Act to enable the surviving Executor named in the Will of William Lock Esquire deceased, to lay out the Residue of the Personal Estate of the Said William Lock, or some Part thereof, in the Purchase of Estates in Ireland, to be conveyed, settled, and allured, to the Uses, upon the Trusts, and for the Intents and Purposes, and subject to the Powers and Provisoes mentioned, declared, and contained, in and by the Said Will, instead of laying out the same in the Purchase of Estates in England, as by the Said Will is directed.
Cartwright's Estate Act 1770	10 Geo. 3. c. 77 Pr.	19 May 1770
An Act for enabling Thomas Cartwright Esquire, to sell, in Fee-Simple, Part of the Settled Estates of the Said Thomas Cartwright, to discharge Incumbrances, and for settling the Remainder of the Said Estates to the several Uses therein mentioned.
Nelthorpe's Estate Act 1770	10 Geo. 3. c. 78 Pr.	19 May 1770
An Act for vesting the Freehold Estates, late of James Nelthorpe Esquire deceased, in Trustees, in order that the same, or a sufficient Part thereof, may be sold, to raise Money to be applied to pay off the Debts and Incumbrances charged upon and affecting the same, and for laying out the Surplus of the Purchase Money upon the Trusts and for the Purposes therein expressed.
Confirming John Martin's jointure made under a power in James Martin's will and making said power more effectual.	10 Geo. 3. c. 79 Pr.	19 May 1770
An Act for confirming a Jointure made by John Martin Esquire, under a Power contained in the Will of James Martin Esquire deceased, and rendering the same Power more effectual.
Richard Champney's Estate Act 1770	10 Geo. 3. c. 80 Pr.	19 May 1770
An Act for Sale of Part of the Settled Estates, late of Richard Champneys Esquire deceased, for Payment of his Debts and Legacies; and for other Purposes therein mentioned.
Countess of Aylesford's Estate Act 1770	10 Geo. 3. c. 81 Pr.	19 May 1770
An Act for vesting certain Manors and Lands in the County of Norfolk, Part of the Settled Estates of Charlotte Countess of Aylesford, and her Issue, in Heneage Earl of Aylesford and his Heirs, and for settling other Manors, Lands, and Hereditaments, in the County of Warwick, the Estates of the Said Earl, of greater and better Value, to the like Uses, in Lieu thereof.
Evelyn's Estate Act 1770	10 Geo. 3. c. 82 Pr.	19 May 1770
An Act for vesting several Messuages or Tenements and Hereditaments, situate and being in Stable Yard Street, in the Parish of Greenwich, in the County of Kent, lately the Estate of Thomas Elvey Bricklayer deceased, in Trustees, to be sold to the Commissioners or Governors and Directors of the Royal Hospital for Seamen at Greenwich, for the Use of the Said Hospital; and for applying the Money arising by such Sale in the Purchase of other Lands, Tenements, and Hereditaments, to be conveyed to such Uses as the Said Messuage or Tenements do now stand limited.
Enabling Charles Anderson (now Pelham), Charles Anderson (the uncle) and Evelyn Anderson to make jointures upon their respective marriages from estates devised to them by Charles Pelham's will.	10 Geo. 3. c. 83 Pr.	19 May 1770
An Act to enable Charles Anderson, (now called Charles Pelham), Charles Anderson the Uncle, and Evelyn Anderson, Esquires, to make Jointures, upon their respective Marriages, out of the Estates devised to them by the Will of Charles Pelham, late of Brocklesby, in the county of Lincoln, Esquire deceased.
Sale and conveying the two undivided fourth parts of manors and lands in Great Bourton and Litte Bourton (Oxfordshire) belonging to Priscilla Allett and Alice Warner's children, to William Prowett and laying out proceeds in consolidated bank annuities.	10 Geo. 3. c. 84 Pr.	19 May 1770
An Act for vesting the Two undivided Fourth Parts of Priscilla Allett (the Wife of John Allett Esquire), and of William James Warner, Samuel George Warner, Rebecca Warner, and Mary Jane Charlotte Warner, the only Children of 'Alice” Warner, (the late Wife of William Warner Gentleman), of and in the Manors or reputed Manors of Great Bourton and Little Bourton, and divers Messuages, Lands, and Hereditaments, in the Parishes of Great Bourton and Little Bourtor, in the County of Oxford, in Trustees, to sell and convey the same to William Prowett Gentleman; and for laying out the Money arising by such Sale in Three Pounds per Centum Consolidated Bank Annuities, to be secured and transferred in Manner therein mentioned.
Prowse's Estate Act 1770	10 Geo. 3. c. 85 Pr.	19 May 1770
An Act to confirm and render valid and effectual a Partition of divers Manors, Lands, and Hereditaments, in the several Counties of Somerset, Wilts, Worcester, Dorset, Surry, and Middlesex, and in the City of London, late the Estates of Thomas Browse Esquire deceased, and which, upon the Death of George Browse Esquire, his only Son, devolved upon and vested in the Two Daughters and Coheiresses of the Said Thomas Browse deceased; and for settling and assuring the Manors, Lands, and Hereditaments, which, upon the Said Partition, have been allotted as the specifick Part or Share of each of the Said Daughters, to the several Uses therein limited.
Upper Dunsforth and Branton (Yorkshire) Inclosure Act 1770	10 Geo. 3. c. 86 Pr.	19 May 1770
An Act for dividing and enclosing several Common Fields, Meadow Grounds, Common Pastures and other unenclosed Grounds, within the Township or Territories of Upper Dunsforth and Branton, in the County of York.
Welton Inclosure Act 1770	10 Geo. 3. c. 87 Pr.	19 May 1770
An Act for enclosing several Open and Common Fields and Commonable Lands, in the Manor and Parish of Welton, in the County of Lincoln.
Comberford and Wiggington (Staffordshire) Inclosure Act 1770	10 Geo. 3. c. 88 Pr.	19 May 1770
An Act for dividing and enclosing the Open Arable Fields, Meadows, Grounds, Commons, Pastures, and other Commonable Lands and Grounds, within the Manor of Comber ford and Wiggington, or Prebends of Wiggington and Coton, in the County of Stafford.
Great Carlton and Castle Carlton (Lincolnshire) Inclosure Act 1770	10 Geo. 3. c. 89 Pr.	19 May 1770
An Act for dividing and enclosing the Open and Common Fields, Common Meadows, Common Pastures, a Cow Pasture, and other Commonable Lands, within the Parishes of Great Carlton and Castle Carlton, in the County of Lincoln.
Great Cowden Inclosure Act 1770	10 Geo. 3. c. 90 Pr.	19 May 1770
An Act for dividing and enclosing the Open and Common Fields, Meadows, Pastures, and Grounds, within the Township of Great Cowden, in the several Parishes of Mapleton and Aldbrough, in Holderness, in the East Riding of the County of York.
Mattersey Inclosure Act 1770	10 Geo. 3. c. 91 Pr.	19 May 1770
An Act for dividing and enclosing the Open Arable Fields, Meadows, Pastures, Commons, and Waste Grounds, in the Parish of Mattersey, in the County of Nottingham.
Easington Inclosure Act 1770	10 Geo. 3. c. 92 Pr.	19 May 1770
An Act for dividing and enclosing certain Open Fields, Common Pastures, and Open Lands and Grounds, within the Township of Easington, in Holderness, in the East Riding of the County of York.
East Heslerton Inclosure Act 1770	10 Geo. 3. c. 93 Pr.	19 May 1770
An Act for dividing and enclosing certain Open and Common Fields, Meadows, Pastures, and other Commonable Lands and Grounds, in East Heslerton, in the Parish of West Heslerton, in the East Riding of the County of York.
Forest of Knaresborough Inclosure Act 1770 (repealed)	10 Geo. 3. c. 94 Pr.	19 May 1770
An Act for dividing and enclosing such of the Open Parts of the District called The Forest of Knaresborough, in the County of York, as lie within the Eleven Constableries there of; and for other Purposes therein mentioned. (Repealed by Harrogate Stray Act 1985 (c. xxii))
Enabling James Grenville, Robert Viscount Clare and Wellbore Ellis to take, in Great Britain, the oaths of office of Vice Treasurer, Receiver General and Paymaster General of Ireland, and to qualify themselves for the enjoyment of the said offices.	10 Geo. 3. c. 95 Pr.	19 May 1770
An Act to enable the Right Honourable James Grenville, the Right Honourable Robert Craggs Lord Viscount Clare, and the Right Honourable Welbore Ellis, to take, in Great Britain, the Oath of Office as Vice Treasurer, and Receiver General, and Paymaster General, of all His Majesty's Revenues in the Kingdom of Ireland, and to qualify themselves for the Enjoyment of the Said Offices.
Enabling Robert Viscount Clare, Wellbore Ellis, and George Lord Edgecombe to take, in Great Britain, the oaths of office of Vice Treasurer, Receiver General and Paymaster General of Ireland, and to qualify themselves for the enjoyment of the said offices.	10 Geo. 3. c. 96 Pr.	19 May 1770
An Act to enable the Right Honourable Robert Lord Viscount Clare, the Right Honourable Welbore Ellis, and the Right Honourable George Lord Edgecumbe, to take, in Great Britain, the Oath of Office as Vice Treasurer, and Receiver General, and Paymaster General, of all His Majesty's Revenues in the Kingdom of Ireland, and to qualify themselves for the Enjoyment of the Said Offices.

=== Sources ===
- "10 George III - 1770". The Statutes at Large. Vol. 28. C. Eyre and A. Strahan. 1768 – via Internet Archive.
- "10 George III - 1770". The Statutes at Large. Vol. 28. 1768 – via Google Books.
- "10 George III - 1770". The Statutes at Large. Vol. 28. Printed by J. Bentham. 1807 – via Internet Archive.
- Journals of the House of Commons. Vol. 32. London: His Majesty's Stationery Office. 1803. pp. 455–984 – via Google Books.
- Chronological Table of and Index to the Statutes. Vol. 1: To the End of the Session 59 Vict. Sess. 2 (1895) (13th ed.). London: Her Majesty's Stationery Office. 1896. pp. 126–127 – via Google Books.
- "Acts of the Parliament of Great Britain from 1770". legislation.gov.uk. The National Archives.

== See also ==
- List of acts of the Parliament of Great Britain
