= OPQ =

OPQ may refer to:

== Organizations ==
- Omega Pharma-Quick Step, Belgian cycling team
- Office des professions du Québec, Canadian governmental organization
- Office of Pharmaceutical Quality within the Center for Drug Evaluation and Research division of the U.S. Food and Drug Administration

== Other uses ==
- O. P. Q. Letters of 1834, a pair of letters published anonymously by Anthony Butler to try to incite a rebellion against Mexico in Texas
- OPQ v BJM (2011), a court case under judge David Eady; see List of privacy injunction cases in English law
- Occupational Personality Questionnaires
- Yamaha OPQ, see List of Yamaha Corporation products

== See also ==
- OPQS
- OPQRST
