= David Furnish =

Canadian filmmaker (born 1962)

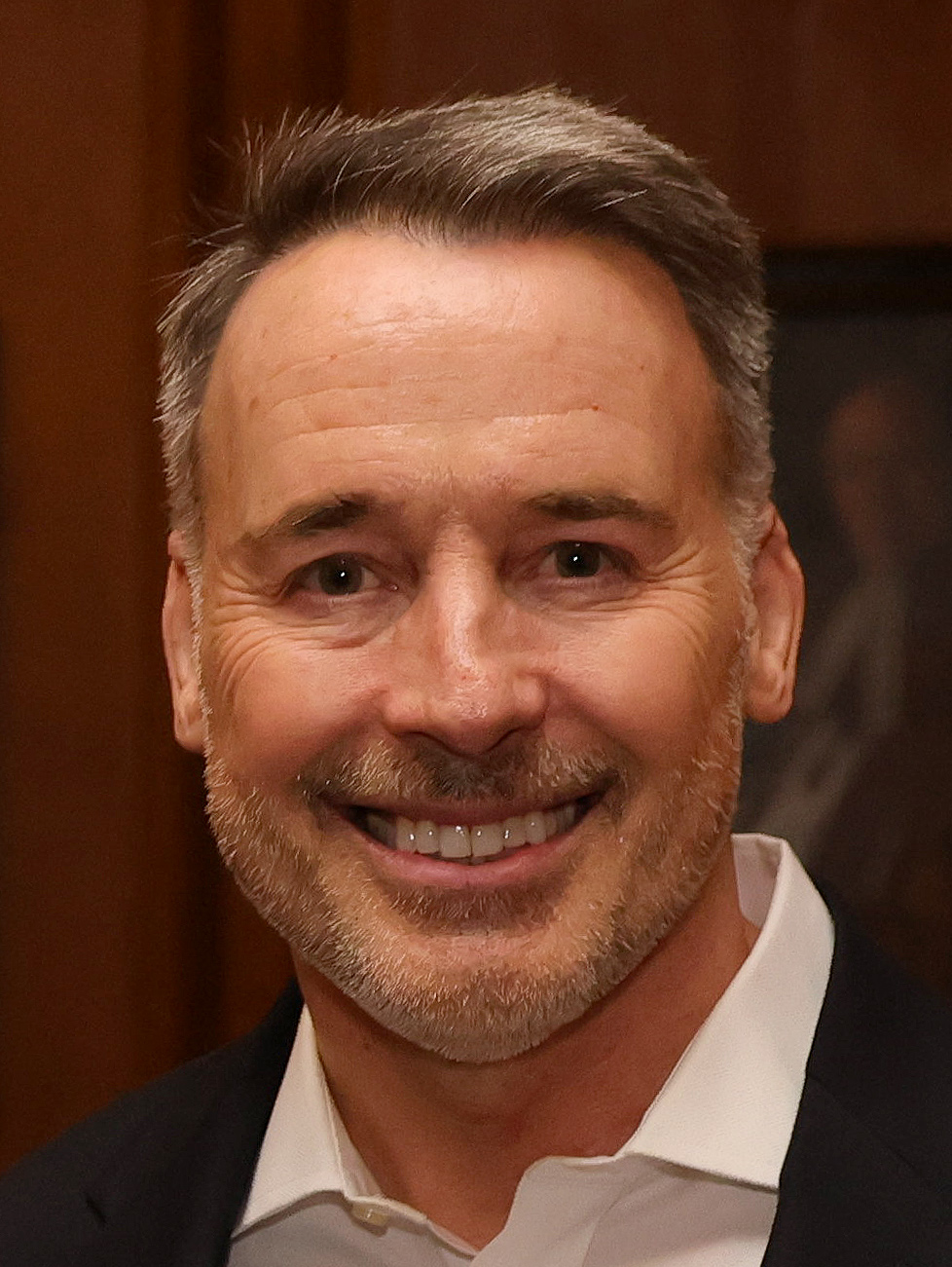
- Furnish in 2024
- Born: David James Furnish; 25 October 1962 (age 64); Toronto, Ontario, Canada
- Education: Sir John A. Macdonald Collegiate Institute (1981); University of Western Ontario (1985)
- Occupations: Artist manager; filmmaker; producer; director
- Years active: 1997–present
- Spouse: Elton John (m. 2014)
- Children: 2

David James Furnish (born 25 October 1962) is a Canadian and British CEO, artist manager, filmmaker and former advertising executive. He is the husband of British singer, songwriter, and pianist Elton John.

== Early life and education ==
David Furnish was born in Toronto at Women's College Hospital, to Gladys and Jack Furnish, a director at Bristol-Myers Company, a pharmaceutical company. He has an older brother, John, and a younger brother, Peter. He graduated from the Sir John A. Macdonald Collegiate Institute in 1981 and received an Honours Bachelor of Business Administration (HBA) from the Ivey Business School at the University of Western Ontario in London, Ontario, in 1985.

== Career ==
After graduation, David Furnish was recruited by the advertising agency Ogilvy & Mather Canada in Toronto. At 27, he asked his firm to transfer him to their British principal offices in London. Furnish flourished there, becoming the firm's youngest director of account services.

Furnish is co-chief of Rocket Pictures with his husband Elton John. Furnish serves on the board of the Elton John AIDS Foundation as chairman, attending fund-raising events and other events in support of the foundation. Furnish is a contributing editor for Tatler, a magazine, and also is a regular columnist for Interview and GQ. In 2015, he was named one of GQ's 50 best dressed men in Britain.

In June 2019, to mark the 50th anniversary of the Stonewall riots, Queerty named him along with Elton John, as one of the Pride50 "trailblazing individuals who actively ensure society remains moving towards equality, acceptance and dignity for all queer people". In 2021, Furnish and Elton John received the Artist and Manager Partnership Award from the Music Managers Forum (MMF) in 2021. The award recognizes their work in music and charity.

Furnish won the Manager of the Year award at the 2022 Music Week Awards. In 2024, Furnish co-directed the documentary Elton John: Never Too Late alongside RJ Cutler.

== Personal life ==
Furnish began a relationship with Elton John in 1993. Elton John proposed to Furnish in May 2005 at a dinner party with friends and family at one of their homes in Old Windsor. They entered into a civil partnership on 21 December 2005, the first day that civil partnerships were able to be performed in England, in the town of Windsor, Berkshire. Their first child was born on 25 December 2010 in California via surrogacy.

On 11 January 2013, the couple's second son was born through the same surrogate as their first. After same-sex marriage became legal in England and Wales in March 2014, they retroactively converted their civil partnership into a marriage and held a ceremony in Windsor on 21 December 2014, the ninth anniversary of their civil partnership.

In 2016, Furnish sought an anonymised privacy injunction in the case PJS v News Group Newspapers Ltd.

== Filmography ==
- Elton John: Tantrums & Tiaras; director (1997)
- Women Talking Dirty; producer (1999)
- Desert Flower; co-producer (1999)
- Kofi Annan: Center of the Storm; executive producer (2002)
- Fame and Fashion: Inside Gucci – Sex and Fashion; director, script writer (2002)
- Fame and Fashion: Inside Versace – Fame and Fashion; director, script writer (2002)
- It's a Boy Girl Thing; producer (2006)
- Pride and Predator; producer (announced 2009)
- Gnomeo & Juliet; producer (2011)
- Billy Elliot the Musical Live; executive producer (2014)
- Virtuoso; executive producer (2015)
- Sherlock Gnomes; producer (2018)
- Rocketman; producer (2019)
- Elton John: Never Too Late, director (2024)
- Spinal Tap II, himself (2025)

== Television ==
- Spectacle: Elvis Costello with...; producer (2008)

== Theatre ==
- Billy Elliot the Musical; executive producer (March 2005)
