= Elton John: Tantrums & Tiaras =

Tantrums & Tiaras
- Directed by: David Furnish
- Produced by: Polly Steele; Claudia Rosencrantz
- Starring: Elton John; David Furnish
- Cinematography: David Furnish
- Edited by: Martin Cooper
- Music by: Elton John
- Production company: Rocket Pictures
- Distributed by: PolyGram Filmed Entertainment
- Release date: 1997
- Running time: 74 min (Director’s Cut)
- Country: United Kingdom
- Language: English

Tantrums & Tiaras is a 1997 British documentary film about the private life of musician Elton John, directed by his partner and future husband David Furnish. It was recorded during John's Made in England Tour in 1995 and includes parts of interviews and concerts. Included in the documentary is a large part of a concert John performed in Rio de Janeiro, Brazil in November 1995.

It was re-released as a "Director's Cut" on DVD in November 2008 with extra material.
