= Controverted Elections Act 1828 =

Act of the Parliament of the United Kingdom

- Act of Parliament
- Parliament of the United Kingdom
- Long title: An Act to consolidate and amend the Laws relating to the Trial of controverted Elections or Returns of Members to serve in Parliament.
- Citation: 9 Geo. 4. c. 22
- Territorial extent: United Kingdom

Dates
- Royal assent: 23 May 1828
- Commencement: 28 July 1828 (Note: Section 67.)
- Repealed: 5 September 1844
Other legislation
Amends	See § Repealed enactments
Repeals/revokes	See § Repealed enactments
Repealed by	Controverted Elections Act 1844

Status: Repealed

Text of statute as originally enacted

The Controverted Elections Act 1828 (9 Geo. 4. c. 22) was an act of the Parliament of the United Kingdom that consolidated the law relating to the trial of controverted parliamentary election petitions in Great Britain.

== Provisions ==
=== Repealed enactments ===
Section 1 of the act repealed 12 enactments, listed in that section.

Citation	Short title	Description	Extent of repeal
10 Geo. 3. c. 16	Parliamentary Elections Act 1770	An Act to regulate the Trials of Controverted Elections, or Returns of Members to serve in Parliament.	The whole act.
11 Geo. 3. c. 42	Parliamentary Elections Act 1771	An Act to explain and amend an Act made in the last Session of Parliament, intituled, "An Act to regulate the Trials of controverted Elections or Returns of Members to serve in Parliament."	The whole act.
14 Geo. 3. c. 15	Parliamentary Elections Act 1774	An Act for making perpetual Two Acts, passed in the Tenth and Eleventh Years of the Reign of His present Majesty, for regulating the Trials of Controverted Elections, or Returns of Members to serve in Parliament.	The whole act.
25 Geo. 3. c. 84	Parliamentary Elections Act 1785	An Act to limit the Duration of Polls and Scrutinies, and for making other Regulations touching the Election of Members to serve in Parliament for Places within England and Wales, and for Berwick upon Tweed, and also for removing Difficulties which may arise for Want of Returns being made of Members to serve in Parliament.	So much as relates to the appointment of a select committee to take into consideration the petition of any person claiming to have had a right to vote, or to have been entitled to have been declared duly elected, where no return has been made to any writ issued for the electing of any member or members to serve in Parliament, on or before the day on which such writ is made returnable, or within fifty-two days after the day on which such writ bears date, if such writ be issued during any session or prorogation of Parliament, or where the return be not according to the requisition of the writ, but contains special matters only concerning the election; also to the notices to be given of the meeting of such committees, and to the manner in which the trials of such petitions are to be regulated, and the mode in which parties entitled to be returned may proceed against any sheriff or returning officer, in case a select committee shall have determined that such sheriff or returning officer had wilfully delayed or neglected or refused to make such return.
28 Geo. 3. c. 52	Controverted Elections Act 1788	An Act for the further Regulation of the Trials of controverted Elections, or Returns of Members to serve in Parliament.	The whole act, except in so far as it relates to the repeal of so much of an Act passed in the second year of the reign of King George II, intituled "An Act for the more effectual preventing Bribery and Corruption in the Election of Members to serve in Parliament," as enacts that such votes shall be deemed legal which have been so declared by the last determination in the House of Commons, and that such last determination concerning any county, city, borough, or place, shall be final.
32 Geo. 3. c. 1	Controverted Elections, etc. Act 1792	An Act to extend the Provisions of certain Acts of Parliament, made to regulate the Trials of controverted Elections, or Returns of Members to serve in Parliament.	The whole act.
34 Geo. 3. c. 83	Election Petitions Act 1794	An Act to explain so much of an Act, made in the Twenty-eighth Year of His present Majesty's Reign, intituled, "An Act for the further Regulation of the Trials of controverted Elections, or Returns of Members to serve in Parliament," as relates to the Time of presenting certain renewed Petitions, and taking the same into Consideration.	The whole act.
36 Geo. 3. c. 59	Controverted Elections Act 1796	An Act for the more effectual Execution of several Acts of Parliament, made for the Trials of controverted Elections, or Returns of Members to serve in Parliament.	The whole act.
42 Geo. 3. c. 84	Controverted Elections Act 1802	An Act for the further Regulation of the Trials of controverted Elections or Returns of Members to serve in Parliament, and for expediting the Proceedings relating thereto.	The whole act.
47 Geo. 3. Sess. 1. c. 1	Controverted Elections Act 1807	An Act to revive and make perpetual and to amend an Act made in the Forty-second Year of His present Majesty, for the further Regulation of the Trials of controverted Elections or Returns of Members to serve in Parliament, and for expediting the Proceedings relating thereto.	The whole act.
47 Geo. 3. Sess. 1. c. 14	Controverted Elections (Ireland) Act 1807	An Act to amend several Acts, for regulating the Trial of Controverted Elections or Returns of Members to serve in Parliament, so far as the same relate to Ireland.	So much as enacts that the order for taking into consideration any petition relative to the trial of any controverted election or return in Ireland shall not be discharged until the expiration of twenty-eight days after such petition shall have been presented to the House of Commons, by reason that the recognizance required by an Act made in the twenty-eighth year of His late Majesty's reign, intituled "An Act for the further Regulation of the Trials of controverted Elections or Returns of Members to serve in Parliament," was not received by the Speaker under the provisions of the said recited act.
53 Geo. 3. c. 71	Controverted Elections Act 1813	An Act for amending and rendering more effectual the Laws for the Trials of Controverted Elections and Returns of Members to serve in Parliament.	The whole act.

== Subsequent developments ==
The whole act was repealed by section 1 of the Controverted Elections Act 1844 (7 & 8 Vict. c. 103), which came into force at the end of that session of Parliament, on 5 September 1844.
