= NMC v Persons Unknown =

2009 English legal case

NMC v Persons Unknown is a 2009 English legal case in which a super-injunction was obtained. The details of the injunction are not publicly known. The case is cited as an example of a super-injunction in Laura Scaife's Handbook of Social Media Law.
