= MNB v News Group Newspapers =

Privacy law case

MNB v News Group Newspapers also known as Goodwin v News Group Newspapers is an English privacy law case in which then banker Fred Goodwin successfully applied for a temporary injunction to prevent The Sun from publishing details about his private life. The injunction was breached by John Hemming MP in the House of Commons where the case was inaccurately referred to as a super-injunction.

== Breach of injunction ==
On 10 March 2011, John Hemming, a backbench Liberal Democrat MP, referred in Parliament (under parliamentary privilege) to the supposed existence of "a superinjunction preventing [Goodwin] from being identified as a banker". As matters discussed in Parliament can be freely reported by the press, newspapers including The Guardian, The Independent, and The Daily Telegraph, reported that Goodwin had obtained such an injunction, while still remaining unable to explain what information the injunction restricted the publication of.

On 19 May 2011, Lord Stoneham, speaking in the House of Lords, asked the Government "how can it be right for a super-injunction to hide the alleged relationship between Sir [sic] Fred Goodwin and a senior colleague?" Later that day, the High Court varied the order, allowing Goodwin's name to be published, but continued it in relation to the identity of the lady involved. In his judgment, Mr Justice Tugendhat noted that the order had not been a superinjunction as it had been published in anonymised form on the British and Irish Legal Information Institute website. He also stated that the injunction had not prevented Goodwin being identified as a banker, but instead prevented the person applying for the injunction from being identified as a banker, and that this was done because "if the applicant were identified as a banker that would be likely to lead to his being named, which would defeat the purpose of granting him anonymity". The judge criticised press reporting of the case as including "misleading and inaccurate statements".

== See also ==
- Fred Goodwin v News Group Newspapers and VBN [2011] EWHC 1437 (QB)
