= Parliamentary Elections Act 1770 =

Act of the Parliament of Great Britain

- Act of Parliament
- Parliament of Great Britain
- Long title: An Act to regulate the Trials of Controverted Elections, or Returns of Members to serve in Parliament.
- Citation: 10 Geo. 3. c. 16
- Territorial extent: Great Britain

Dates
- Royal assent: 12 April 1770
- Commencement: 12 April 1770 (Note: Section 1.)
- Repealed: 28 July 1828
Other legislation
Amended by	Parliamentary Elections Act 1771; Parliamentary Elections Act 1774
Repealed by	Controverted Elections Act 1828
Relates to	Controverted Elections Act 1801

Status: Repealed

Text of statute as originally enacted

The Parliamentary Elections Act 1770 (10 Geo. 3. c. 16), also known as the Grenville Act, was an act of the Parliament of Great Britain. The act transferred the power of trying election petitions from the House of Commons as a whole to a less politicised committee of the House. All contested elections were to be considered by a committee of thirteen members selected by ballot. The act was initially limited to one year, but was extended several times. A bill was passed in 1774 to make it perpetual – by that time five cases had already been tried.

== Subsequent developments ==
The whole act was repealed by section 1 of the Controverted Elections Act 1828 (9 Geo. 4. c. 22), which came into force on 28 July 1828.

== Bibliography ==
- Erskine May, Chapter VI, pp. 362–75, Election Petitions: Places and Pensions
