= TSE and ELP v News Group Newspapers =

English privacy case

TSE and ELP v News Group Newspapers [2011] EWHC 1308 (QB) is an English privacy case involving a footballer's private life. In this case an injunction was sought to prevent publication of details that would identify the claimant as having had a sexual relationship with another individual.
