= Fred Goodwin v News Group Newspapers and VBN =

Fred Goodwin v News Group Newspapers and VBN ([2011] EWHC 1437 (QB)) is a 2011 privacy case involving Fred Goodwin.

== Facts ==
The claimant sought an injunction preventing publication of the fact he had an affair with a co-worker. After widespread publication of this information the defendant was successful in getting the injunction discharged. However, the defendant now also sought to identify the woman involved.

== Judgment ==
Tugendhat J ruled that publication of the identity of the woman would not be in the public interest.
