= JIH v News Group Newspapers Ltd =

Precedential lawsuit in the United Kingdom

JIH v News Group Newspapers Ltd [2011] EWCA Civ 42 is a 2011 privacy case in the United Kingdom. The case relates to a story that The Sun newspaper wished to publish relating to an alleged affair between the claimant JIH and another person. An anonymity order was granted. The Guardian newspaper state that the individual who sought the injunction in this case is a sportsman.
