= CDE & FGH v Mirror Group Newspapers and LMN =

- Citation: [2010] EWHC 3308

CDE & FGH v Mirror Group Newspapers and LMN [2010] EWHC 3308 is an English privacy law case. The case was a misuse of private information claim in which two claimants sought an interim injunction preventing the two defendants from publishing private information about them.

The case is unusual in that not only are the claimants granted anonymity but also defendants and non-parties. The first claimant "CDE" is described as someone who often appears on television. The second claimant "FGH" is the wife of the first claimant. The second defendant "LMN" is described as a single mother on disability benefits who wished to sell a story relating to the claimants to The Sunday Mirror newspaper.
