= Anonymised injunctions in English law =

Term in English privacy law

In English law an anonymised injunction is, according to the Neuberger Committee, "an interim injunction which restrains a person from publishing information which concerns the applicant and is said to be confidential or private where the names of either or both of the parties to the proceedings are not stated". An anonymised injunction is distinct from a "superinjunction" which also prevents publication that the injunction has been obtained. When reported, anonymised injunctions have case names which hide the identity of one or more parties, for example PJS v News Group Newspapers.
