= WER v REW =

2009 UK court case

WER v REW was an anonymised legal case in which Chris Hutcheson, represented by Hugh Tomlinson QC, of Schillings, took out an injunction to prevent Popdog Ltd from publishing details regarding his private life, and was heard before Justice Sir Charles Grey in January 2009. Hutcheson – Gordon Ramsay's former business partner and father-in-law – gained an injunction but it was later partially lifted, and ultimately overturned in the Court of Appeal, with Hutcheson being publicly named by the judge.

== Background ==
Hutcheson had sued anonymously to prevent publication of the material; the interim injunction he received was to run either until after the eventual court hearing, or until a time otherwise determined by the court. In the event, Hutcheson and the publisher reached a mutual compromise: the latter would not print, and the former would drop their suit. The following year, however, News Group Newspapers, wishing to publish the original material in The Sun, applied to have the 2009 injunction set aside. The newspaper claimed to have evidence that Hutcheson was using money from Ramsay's business to support a second family. Mr Justice Eady, sitting in camera in December 2010, stated that Hutcheson – called KGM due to the reporting restrictions imposed – could not "rely on the law of privacy" to protect his personal life, and stated that the 2009 injunction had expired with the parties' self-arbitration. Eady said that Hutcheson "threw away his right to keep his strange double life secret when he entered into a slanging match" with Ramsay, and that as a result of the WER v R.W compromise, Hutcheson had been effectively "sitting on an interim injunction as though it gave the permanence and security of a final injunction." However, the judge made no comment on the accuracy of The Sun's original allegations.

== Hutcheson's appeal ==
Eady's judgement, however, could not be reported by the UK press until the following year as a result of Hutcheson appealing to the Court of Appeal; Hutcheson's solicitor argued that, whilst his client's behaviour "might well be said to be morally blameworthy" it was in no way criminal. In their judgement, the Appeal Court upheld Eady's ruling, saying that, just because information was related to private life, "it did not necessarily follow that there was a reasonable expectation of privacy." The case has, in part, been summarised as demonstrating that if a person quarrels in public, the boundary between public and private 'will blur' legally. The judges named 'KGM' as Hutcheson, and soon after ruled that their judgement could be published in almost its entirety. Details of the case subsequently appeared in the Daily Mail and The Sun, and The Daily Telegraph subsequently reported that Hutcheson had fathered two children in the course of his affair.

== Legal significance ==
The case is one of several so-called superinjunctions dealing with the English common law position in relation to privacy and social media. Here, the Court of Appeal offered guidance on the conditions in which permission to appeal would be granted where it was only of academic importance, laying down three requirements: that the appeal could raise significant questions, that the defendant not be adversely affected by it, and that a full hearing would be open to all concerned parties. The Guardian described the outcome of the case as "a further setback to the power of privacy orders to restrict reporting", coming as it did the day after Ryan Giggs was named in Parliament as also having brought a similar injunction over allegations of an affair.

== See also ==
- Superinjunction
