= RJW v Guardian News and Media Ltd =

RJW v Guardian News and Media Limited
- Court: High Court of England and Wales
- Full case name: RJW and SJW v. Guardian News and Media Ltd and Person(s)
- Decided: 11 September 2009
- Citation: [2009] EWHC 2540 (QB)
- Cases cited: Lord Browne of Madingley v. Associated Newspapers Ltd. [2008] QB 103
- Legislation cited: Human Rights Act 1988

Court membership
- Judge sitting: Maddison J

RJW v Guardian News and Media Limited ([2009] EWHC 2540 (QB)), also known as Trafigura v Guardian News and Media Limited and the Trafigura case, was a 2009 legal action in which Trafigura attempted to use a super-injunction to prevent the press reporting details of toxic waste dumping in the Ivory Coast. A landmark case in UK privacy law, the case brought these types of injunction under scrutiny and caused government concern about the injunctions and how they are used. The injunction was released on The Guardian after Paul Farrelly MP brought up the topic during Parliamentary Questions and the publication of the report on WikiLeaks.
