= Parliamentary privilege in the United Kingdom =

Limited legal immunity for parliamentarians

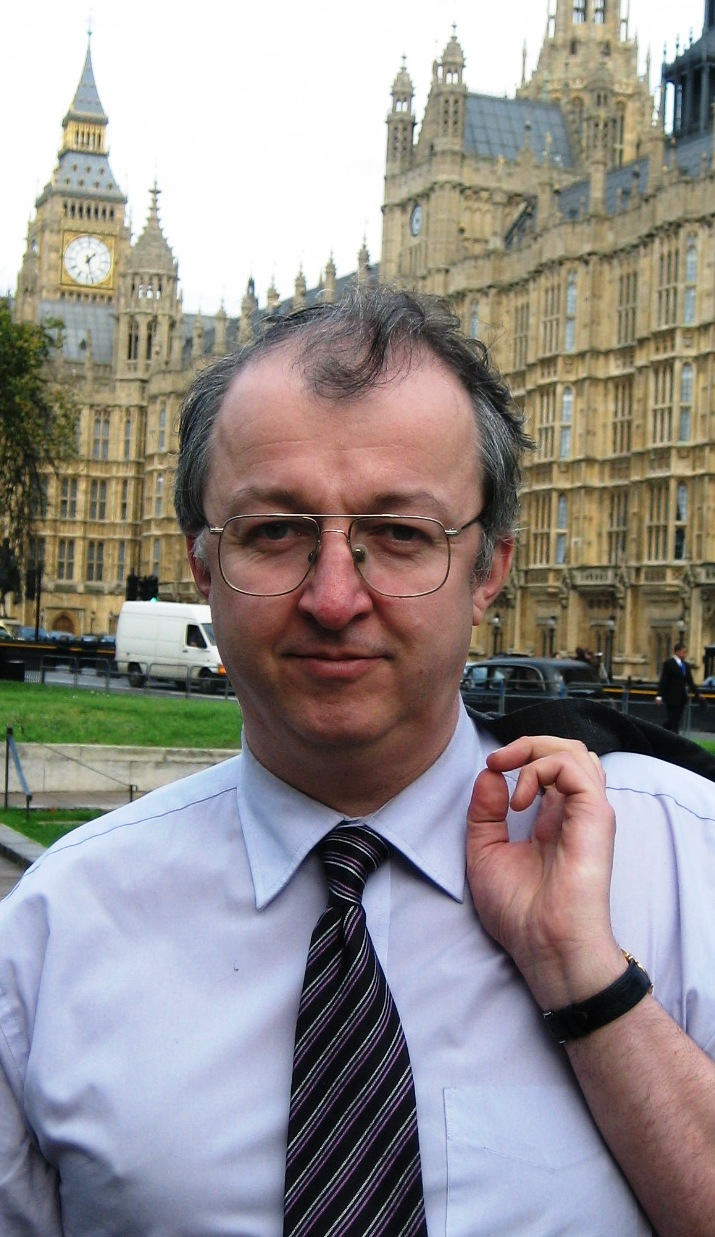
The Liberal Democrat politician John Hemming used parliamentary privilege to reveal the litigant involved in the case CTB v News Group Newspapers.

Parliamentary privilege in the United Kingdom is a legal immunity enjoyed by members of the House of Commons and House of Lords designed to ensure that parliamentarians are able to carry out their duties free from interference. The privileges are freedom of speech, freedom from arrest on civil matters, freedom of access to the sovereign, and that "the most favourable construction should be placed on all the Houses' proceedings". Fair and accurate reporting of the proceedings of parliament is also protected by parliamentary privilege.

Parliamentary privilege is, however, something that forms part of the law rather than putting Members of Parliament above the law: for example, the MPs Chris Huhne and Fiona Onasanya were both successfully convicted of non-parliamentary criminal offences in the 2010s; and the 2010 Supreme Court case R v Chaytor, argued in the wake of the parliamentary expenses scandal, ruled that MPs were not immune to prosecution for crimes such as fraud conducted in relation to their parliamentary activities.

== Components ==
Parliamentary privilege has two main components:

- Freedom of speech as guaranteed by the Bill of Rights, but also without any possible defamation claims. An example of this is when, in 2018, Labour peer Lord Hain named Sir Philip Green as the person at the centre of allegations of sexual and racial harassment.
- Exclusive cognisance, the freedom of Parliament to control its own internal affairs.

== History ==
The doctrine was first enshrined in law after the Glorious Revolution following the passage of the Bill of Rights 1689. Prior to the Bill of Rights, Parliament had no statutory protection, but nevertheless had asserted both the freedom of speech and freedom from arrest, especially against what they perceived to be tyrannical acts by the king. Since the late 15th century, members of the Commons enjoyed 'an undefined right to freedom of speech, as a matter of tradition rather than by virtue of a privilege'. One of the flashpoints that led to the English Civil War was the attempted arrest by King Charles I of the Five Members for treason, which Parliament viewed as being in violation of its ancient liberties.

Lewis Namier gives a number of examples of criminals escaping prosecution, public officials escaping censure and bankrupts escaping creditors, claiming that it was a significant reason for many men to try to become MPs.

After the case of Stockdale v Hansard (1839) found that Hansard, although ordered by Parliament to publish transcripts of its debates, did not enjoy the protection of parliamentary privilege, Parliament immediately passed the Parliamentary Papers Act 1840, which gave absolute civil or criminal immunity to papers published by order of Parliament, and qualified immunity to any publication outside of Parliament that published extracts from Hansard without malice.

== Examples ==
There are multiple modern examples of Members exercising the right to parliamentary privilege, most notably related to freedom of speech and immunity from prosecution.

- In October 2009, Paul Farrelly submitted a written parliamentary question regarding a so-called "super-injunction" against The Guardian newspaper which prevented them from naming Trafigura as the company responsible for the 2006 Ivory Coast toxic waste dump, and the efforts by legal firm Carter-Ruck to prevent The Guardian from reporting on the question or even the existence of the injunction.
- In May 2011, John Hemming exercised parliamentary privilege to name footballer Ryan Giggs as the litigant involved in the case CTB v News Group Newspapers. Giggs had applied for a super-injunction in England and Wales to prevent reporting by The Sun of his extramarital affair, but his failure to apply for an injunction in Scotland led to the information being widely known after it was published by the Sunday Herald.
- In October 2018, Lord Hain used parliamentary privilege to name Philip Green as the subject of accusations of bullying and sexual harassment due to Green obtaining an injunction preventing the allegations from being reported.
- In July 2021, Social Democratic and Labour Party leader Colum Eastwood exercised parliamentary privilege to name "Soldier F", the British paratrooper who killed five unarmed civilians during the Bloody Sunday massacre of 1972.
- In February 2022, Layla Moran used parliamentary privilege to name 35 people who she claimed were Russian oligarchs, arguing that they should be sanctioned due to their closeness to Russia's president during the Russo-Ukrainian war.

== Select committees ==
Witnesses to parliamentary select committees also enjoy parliamentary privilege if their evidence is formally accepted. As an example, this was used in 2009 by Private Eye editor Ian Hislop when giving evidence to a select committee on press standards, privacy and libel, to publish details of a legal threat received confidentially from the lawyers of Richard Granger.

== Case law ==
- Strode's Case (1512)
- The Case of the Five Members (1641)
- Ashby v White (1703)
- R v Paty (1705)
- Stockdale v Hansard (1837)
- Bradlaugh v Gossett (1840)
- The Case of the Sheriff of Middlesex (1840)
- Pepper v Hart (1993)
- R v Chaytor (2010)

== Legislation ==
- Parliamentary Privilege Act 1770

== Scotland, Wales and Northern Ireland ==
Members of the Scottish Parliament do not have parliamentary privilege, however the Scotland Act 1998 incorporates a number of legal protections for parliamentary debate and reporting, including absolute privilege for the purpose of the law of defamation, limits to the remedies which can be ordered by courts against the Parliament in civil cases, and qualified protection from strict liability contempt under the Contempt of Court Act 1981.

Equivalent protections apply to proceedings of the Welsh and Northern Irish Assembles under the Government of Wales Act 2006 and the Northern Ireland Act 1998.

== See also ==
- Absolute privilege in English law
- Backbencher
- English defamation law
