= Neuberger Committee =

Committee investigating super-injunctions in English law

The Neuberger Committee was a committee set up to examine the law and practice surrounding super-injunctions in English law. It reported in May 2011.
