= PJS v News Group Newspapers Ltd =

UK legal case

- Court: Supreme Court of the United Kingdom
- Full case name: PJS v News Group Newspapers Limited
- Decided: 19 May 2016
- Citation: [2016] UKSC 26

Keywords
- Right to privacy

PJS v News Group Newspapers Ltd [2016] UKSC 26 is a UK constitutional law case in which an anonymised privacy injunction (Note: The injunction has been incorrectly referred to as a "super-injunction" in some media reports. Super-injunctions prohibit publication of the fact that an injunction has been obtained.) was obtained by a claimant, identified in court documents as "PJS", to prohibit publication of the details of a sexual encounter between him and two other people. Media outside England and Wales identified PJS as David Furnish.

In January 2016, PJS applied to the High Court of Justice in London for an injunction to prevent publication of a news story relating to the encounter by The Sun on Sunday. That was declined on the basis that publication would be in the public interest. PJS applied to the Court of Appeal and was successful in overturning the High Court decision. In April 2016, the Court of Appeal ruled that the injunction should be lifted, as the allegations had been published widely abroad and online. PJS then appealed to the Supreme Court of the United Kingdom, which in May 2016 decided to uphold the injunction by a majority of 4–1. The case has led to debate about the effectiveness of injunctions in the age of the Internet and social media websites.

== Facts ==
The claimant is married to "YMA", both of whom are well known in the entertainment business. The couple has young children. PJS engaged in sexual activity with two individuals known as "AB" and "CD", who later approached The Sun on Sunday regarding their sexual encounter.

== Judgment ==
=== High Court ===
On 18 January 2016, PJS applied to the High Court of Justice for an injunction to prohibit The Sun on Sunday from publishing the story. That was declined by Mr Justice Cranston on the basis that publication would be in the public interest, as it would correct a false image of marital commitment that PJS had presented. Cranston stated, "The Claimant and his partner have portrayed an image to the world of a committed relationship. That portrayal has taken a number of forms, Mr Tomlinson QC correctly points out there is always a dilemma for a public figure in that if they do not provide publicity they will be pursued the media [sic]. But undoubtedly the Claimant and his partner have on a number of occasions and in various ways portrayed an image of commitment. Moreover the Claimant has himself actively sought publicity".

=== Court of Appeal ===
PJS took the case to the Court of Appeal, which overturned Cranston's decision on 22 January 2016 and granted an injunction preventing publication of the story. The court ruled that the privacy rights of PJS under Article 8 of the European Convention on Human Rights outweighed the Article 10 freedom of expression rights of the tabloid newspaper that wished to publish the story. The judges found that the image of commitment PJS and YMA had presented was accurate, as commitment does not necessarily entail complete fidelity and therefore the publication did not correct a false image and was not in the public interest. Lord Justice Jackson commented in his ruling: "The proposed story, if it is published, will be devastating for the claimant."

After the granting of the injunction, the identity of PJS was reported by news media outlets in the United States, Canada and Scotland. Paul Staines, a political blogger based in Ireland, was claimed to have broken the injunction but said that he was not subject to the UK gagging order. Within England and Wales, the couple's lawyers worked to ensure that web blocking actions were effective. The former Liberal Democrat MP John Hemming, who had used parliamentary privilege to name the claimant in CTB v News Group Newspapers on the floor of the House of Commons in 2011, said that the matter "isn't a secret any more" and urged judges to lift the injunction.

The Sun on Sunday appealed the ban on publishing the name of PJS, and on 18 April 2016, the Court of Appeal ruled that the injunction should be lifted, as the allegations had been published widely both abroad and online. Lord Justice Jackson stated: "Much of the harm which the injunction was intended to prevent has already occurred. ... The court should not make orders which are ineffective."

=== Supreme Court ===
PJS appealed the decision to lift the interim injunction to the Supreme Court of the United Kingdom. The court heard an appeal on 21 April 2016 and on 19 May 2016 delivered a judgment by a 4–1 margin that allowed the injunction to remain in force. Lord Mance noted in his decision to uphold the injunction:

3. The Court is well aware of the lesson which Canute gave his courtiers. Unlike Canute, the courts can take steps to enforce its injunction pending trial. As to the Mail Online's portrayal of the law as an ass, if that is the price of applying the law, it is one which must be paid. Nor is the law one-sided; on setting aside John Wilkes' outlawry for publishing The North Briton, Lord Mansfield said that the law must be applied even if the heavens fell: R v Wilkes (1768) 4 Burr 2527, 98 ER 327 (347). It is unlikely that the heavens will fall at our decision. It will simply give the appellant, his partner and their young children a measure of temporary protection against further and repeated invasions of privacy pending a full trial which will not have been rendered substantially irrelevant by disclosure of relatively ancient sexual history.

...

32. ... the starting point is that (i) there is not, without more, any public interest in a legal sense in the disclosure or publication of purely private sexual encounters, even though they involve adultery or more than one person at the same time, (ii) any such disclosure or publication will on the face of it constitute the tort of invasion of privacy, (iii) repetition of such a disclosure or publication on further occasions is capable of constituting a further tort of invasion of privacy, even in relation to persons to whom disclosure or publication was previously made - especially if it occurs in a different medium ...

Lord Toulson issued a dissenting judgment, arguing that the details that the injunction was in place to protect had already been published widely on social media.

=== High Court ===
On 4 November 2016, the case was settled by a Tomlin order issued in the High Court of Justice by Mr Justice Warby. News Group Newspapers was ordered to "pay a specified sum in full and final settlement of the claimant's claim for damages and costs of and occasioned by the action" and to give undertakings "not to use, disclose or publish certain information and to remove and not republish certain existing articles".

== Significance ==
Following the Supreme Court decision, there were reports that some Twitter users had received e-mails from the site's legal team asking them to remove tweets naming the couple in the "celebrity threesome" and pointing out that the site's rules require that users "comply with all local laws regarding their online conduct and acceptable content". The legal commentator Joshua Rozenberg compared the injunction in the case to the Spycatcher affair of the 1980s by noting that "both cases raise the same question: at what point should the courts stop trying to preserve the confidentiality of information that is known to many but not to all?" Kathy English wrote in the Toronto Star, "I am not at all comfortable with the fact that defending principles of press freedom involves a legal battle to publish lurid details of anyone's alleged 'three-way sexual encounter'. But ... I do see public interest in the interesting questions this injunction raises about global press freedom and media law within the borderless internet and the lengths to which the super wealthy can and do go in Britain to use the courts to try to block embarrassing information in that country and beyond."

The case was the first time that the Supreme Court of the United Kingdom ruled on an issue related to privacy and the right to freedom of speech, and it was described as creating a de facto privacy law, which would make it difficult for British newspapers to publish future "kiss and tell" stories by virtue of placing privacy above the public's right to know. The media lawyer David Engel described the ruling as drawing a clear distinction between confidentiality and privacy by stating that the Court "has made the practical point that even where people may be able to find the information online, that is qualitatively different – in terms of the distress and damage caused to the victim – from having the story plastered across the front pages of the tabloids." In June 2018, Lord Mance said in an interview after his retirement as Deputy President of the Supreme Court that there was "no point" in maintaining secret identities that had been published online or in the foreign media.

== See also ==
- 2011 British privacy injunctions controversy
- Super-injunctions in English law
- United Kingdom constitutional law
