= DFT v TFD =

English privacy case

- Court: High Court of Justice
- Decided: 27 September 2010
- Citation: [2010] EWHC 2335 (QB)

Court membership
- Judge sitting: Mrs Justice Sharp

DFT v TFD [2010] EWHC 2335 (QB) is an English privacy case which concerned an attempt by a woman to blackmail an individual by revealing details of a sexual relationship the couple had had unless a substantial bribe was paid. A super-injunction was initially granted in the case but later discontinued.
