= Brown Rudnick =

American law firm

Brown Rudnick is an American law firm known in the practice areas of bankruptcy, litigation, brand and reputation management, and corporate transactions.

Founded in 1948 by Charles Rome, Matthew Brown, Alford Rudnick, and Hirsh Freed, it was initially known as Rome, Brown, Rudnick & Freed. It underwent many name changes due to mergers and expansions, including with Berlack Israels & Liberman in 2002.

== Notable cases ==
Brown Rudnick represented Massachusetts in its lawsuit against the tobacco industry in 1995. After the Tobacco Master Settlement Agreement in 1998, the Firm was one of the five industries that was awarded $775 million by a national arbitration panel but sued for an additional $1.3 billion in legal fees. In December 2023, a jury awarded an additional $100 million in fees. The firm gained international attention for its representation of Johnny Depp in the 2022 Depp v. Heard trial. Depp's attorney Camille Vasquez became an overnight celebrity. Following the trial, Camille Vasquez was promoted from associate to partner. The trial was featured in a 2023 three-part documentary series Depp v. Heard released internationally by Netflix in August 2023.

The firm has also represented Mexican pop star Gloria Trevi in two civil lawsuits filed by two women on December 30, 2022, in California.

In October 2022, Brown Rudnick was hired by Kanye West to provide legal counsel on his business interests. However, following West's refusal to retract his anti-Semitic remarks, the collaboration was dissolved.

Kazakhstan's Ministry of Justice hired Brown Rudnick on February 28, 2024 on a wide-ranging retainer that includes handling interactions between the ministry and the U.S. Justice Department.

In June 2021, the firm sued Aylo (formerly MindGeek) and Visa in California on behalf of Serena Fleites and other child sex trafficking victims, claiming that "Pornhub and MindGeek knowingly profited from videos depicting rape, child sexual exploitation, revenge porn, trafficking, and other nonconsensual sexual content". Brown Rudnick attorney Michael Bowe was featured in the 2023 Netflix documentary Money Shot: The Pornhub Story. The first scenes shot were with Bowe on the day he filed a legal complaint.

In a ruling issued on July 29, 2022, U.S. District Judge Cormac Carney ruled that it was reasonable to conclude that MindGeek's activity in hosting child pornography was knowingly facilitated by Visa. The judge ruled in favor of the plaintiff Serena Fleites, and denied Visa's motion to dismiss the case.

In August 2022, in the immediate aftermath of the decision, MasterCard and Visa jointly suspended their acceptance of payments from TrafficJunky.

Brown Rudnick was part of a group of firms that led the opposition to the Texas two-step bankruptcy of Johnson & Johnson subsidiary LTL Management.

In 2026, attorneys Michael R. Graif and Katy-Jade Church of Brown Rudnick were named as counterclaim defendants in a lawsuit filed by Cheryl Bawtinheimer in the United States District Court for the Northern District of California. The counterclaim states that Graif and Church sent and signed Digital Millennium Copyright Act (DMCA) takedown notices targeting YouTube videos, and alleges that those notices constituted knowing misrepresentations under 17 U.S.C. § 512(f). It further alleges that the takedown notices were used to suppress or remove critical content relating to the Rapid Relief Team and the Plymouth Brethren Christian Church.

== Pro bono and community service ==
In February 2021, Brown Rudnick and Lawyers for Civil Rights sued the city of Worcester, Massachusetts alleging that the city's system of electing school committee members diluted the voting power of people of color and violated federal voting laws. The city agreed to a settlement that would replace the all at-large system.
