= Mark Richards =

Mark Richards may refer to:

- Mark Richards (politician) (1760–1844), US congressman from Vermont
- Mark Andrew Richards (born 1952), American scientist
- A. Mark Richards (born 1955), New Zealand cardiologist
- Mark Richards (surfer) (born 1957), Australian surfing champion
- Mark Richards (badminton) (born 1962), Welsh badminton player
- Mark Richards (sailor) (born 1967), Australian yachtsman
- Mark Richards (cricketer) (born 1974), former English cricketer
- Mark Richards (rugby union) (born 1989), South African rugby union and international rugby sevens player
- Mark Richards (jockey), 1990s UK and Irish based steeplechase rider in Triumph Hurdle
- Mark Russell Richards, English scholar and authority on the life and work of Charles Dodgson (Lewis Carroll)
- Mark Richards (DC Comics), fictional character

== See also ==
- Marc Richards (born 1982), English footballer
- Mark Richard (born 1955), writer
- Richard Marks (disambiguation)
