= Camille Vasquez =

American lawyer (born 1984)

- Born: July 6, 1984 (age 41); San Francisco, California, U.S.
- Education: University of Southern California (BA); Southwestern Law School (JD)
- Occupation: Attorney
- Employer: Sheppard, Mullin, Richter & Hampton
- Known for: Representing Johnny Depp in Depp v. Heard

Camille Vasquez (born July 6, 1984) is an American attorney known for representing actor Johnny Depp in the defamation case that he brought against his ex-wife Amber Heard.

== Early life and education ==
Vasquez was born in San Francisco, California, to a Colombian father and a Cuban mother. While attending the University of Southern California, she was a member of Kappa Kappa Gamma, Gamma Sigma Alpha, and the Order of Omega, in addition to being admitted into the Skull and Dagger honor society during her senior year. She graduated magna cum laude from USC in 2006 with a Bachelor of Arts degree in communication and political science. She received her Juris Doctor from Southwestern Law School in 2010.

== Career ==
Vasquez's legal career has focused on litigation and arbitration, particularly in the representation of plaintiffs in defamation litigation. In 2018, she joined the international law firm Brown Rudnick as an associate, practicing in its Southern California office. Vasquez represented Johnny Depp in cases against his former attorney and business manager and then in his defamation suit against his ex-wife Amber Heard. She also represented Depp in a personal injury lawsuit filed against him that was settled outside of court. Other clients she has represented include Ben Affleck, Leonardo DiCaprio, and Jennifer Lopez.

Vasquez represented Depp in the Depp v. Heard trial. The trial was livestreamed, receiving widespread viewership around the world. As a result, Google Trends noted a significant surge in searches of her name, and a hashtag of her name received over 980 million impressions on the video-sharing platform TikTok. Vogue called her an "overnight celebrity" as a consequence of the trial. Following the trial, Vasquez was promoted from associate to partner at her firm, Brown Rudnick.

In October 2022, Vasquez was part of a team at Brown Rudnick hired by Kanye West to provide legal counsel on his business interests. However, following West's refusal to retract his anti-Semitic remarks, the collaboration was dissolved.

In January 2023, she was hired by NBC News as a legal analyst. In May 2023, Vasquez confirmed that she had been hired by Mexican singer Gloria Trevi to represent her in two civil lawsuits filed by two women on December 30, 2022, in California.

In August 2024, it was reported that Vasquez has joined Sheppard, Mullin, Richter & Hampton, working on brand reputation and defamation cases, with Danny Elfman as one of the team's clients.
