= Gamma Sigma Alpha =

American interfraternity honor society

- ΓΣΑ
- Founded: November 9, 1989; 36 years ago University of Southern California
- Type: Honor
- Affiliation: Independent
- Status: Active
- Emphasis: Interfraternity academics
- Scope: National
- Motto: Γαμμα Σιγμα Αλφα
- Pillars: Academic Engagement, Congruence, Excellence, Inclusion, Knowledge, Recognition, and Relationships
- Colors: Red and Gold
- Chapters: 215+
- Headquarters: 316 Cherry Hill Boulevard; Cherry Hill, New Jersey 08002; United States
- Website: gammasigmaalpha.org

Gamma Sigma Alpha (ΓΣΑ, or GSA) is an American academic Greek honor society recognizing academic excellence of members of fraternities and sororities. It was established in 1989 at the University of Southern California.

== History ==
Gamma Sigma Alpha was founded at the University of Southern California on November 9, 1989, by Beth K. Saul and a group of scholastic achievers representing various fraternities and sororities dedicated to advancing higher education and academic accomplishment.

Gamma Sigma Alpha states that its mission is "to recognize and advance academic excellence as a core value of fraternities and sororities". Unlike the Order of Omega, who also reward Greek life academic successes, Gamma Sigma Alpha does not limit the number of members who can be initiated.

The society presents an academic scholarship to one of its members.

Its national headquarters are at 316 Cherry Hill Boulevard in Cherry Hill, New Jersey.

== Symbols ==
The badge of Gamma Sigma Alpha, which can be seen within its seal, consists of a white-lit candle with a golden base on a field of Gules (red) with a bend of argent. Graduating members wear honor cords of red and gold. Its motto is Γαμμα Σιγμα Αλφα. Its values or pillars are Academic Engagement, Congruence, Excellence, Inclusion, Knowledge, Recognition, and Relationships.

== Membership ==
Undergraduate students, in their junior or senior year, can apply for membership if they are members of a Greek fraternity or sorority on campus and have a cumulative grade point average of 3.5 or above (on a 4.0 scale). The society initiates nearly 2,000 members each year.

== Chapters ==
Following are the chapters of Gamma Sigma Alpha, in alphabetical order.

Chapter	Charter date and range	Institution	Location	Status	Ref.
		Adelphi University	Garden City, New York	Inactive	
		Albion College	Albion, Michigan	Inactive	
		Appalachian State University	Boone, North Carolina	Active	
		Arizona State University	Tempe, Arizona	Active	
		Arkansas Tech University	Russellville, Arkansas	Active	
		Ashland University	Ashland, Ohio	Active	
		Auburn University	Auburn, Alabama	Active	
		Austin Peay State University	Clarksville, Tennessee	Active	
		Babson College	Wellesley, Massachusetts	Active	
Alpha Kappa	2009	Baker University	Baldwin City, Kansas	Active	
		Baldwin-Wallace University	Berea, Ohio	Inactive	
		Ball State University	Muncie, Indiana	Inactive	
		Barton College	Wilson, North Carolina	Active	
		Baylor University	Waco, Texas	Active	
		Beloit College	Beloit, Wisconsin	Active	
		Bethany College	Bethany, West Virginia	Inactive	
		Bloomsburg University	Bloomsburg, Pennsylvania	Active	
		Bowling Green State University	Bowling Green, Ohio	Active	
		Brenau University	Gainesville, Georgia	Inactive	
		Bridgewater State College	Bridgewater, Massachusetts	Active	
		Brooklyn College	New York City, New York	Active	
		California State Polytechnic University, Pomona	Pomona, California	Active	
		California State University, Bakersfield	Bakersfield, California	Inactive	
		California State University, Fullerton	Fullerton, California	Active	
		California State University, Northridge	Los Angeles, California	Inactive	
		California State University, San Bernardino	San Bernardino, California	Active	
		California State University, San Marcos	San Marcos, California	Inactive	
		California University of Pennsylvania	California, Pennsylvania	Inactive	
		Capital University	Bexley, Ohio	Active	
		Case Western Reserve University	Cleveland, Ohio	Inactive	
		Centre College	Danville, Kentucky	Inactive	
		Christian Brothers University	Memphis, Tennessee	Active	
		Clemson University	Clemson, South Carolina	Active	
		Coastal Carolina University	Conway, South Carolina	Inactive	
		Coe College	Cedar Rapids, Iowa	Active	
		Colgate University	Hamilton, New York	Active	
		College of William & Mary	Williamsburg, Virginia	Active	
		Colorado State University	Fort Collins, Colorado	Active	
Eta Beta	February 2004	Cumberland University	Lebanon, Tennessee	Active	
	2012	Dartmouth College	Hanover, New Hampshire	Inactive	
		Davis & Elkins College	Elkins, West Virginia	Active	
		Denison University	Granville, Ohio	Active	
		Dickinson College	Carlisle, Pennsylvania	Active	
		Drury University	Springfield, Missouri	Inactive	
		East Tennessee State University	Johnson City, Tennessee	Inactive	
		Eastern Illinois University	Charleston, Illinois	Active	
		Eastern Michigan University	Ypsilanti, Michigan	Inactive	
		Eastern New Mexico University	Portales, New Mexico	Active	
		Elmhurst University	Elmhurst, Illinois	Inactive	
		Elon University	Elon, North Carolina	Inactive	
		Fairleigh Dickinson University	Madison, New Jersey	Active	
		Florida State University	Tallahassee, Florida	Active	
		Georgia Southern University	Statesboro, Georgia	Active	
		Georgia State University	Atlanta, Georgia	Active	
		Georgia Tech	Atlanta, Georgia	Inactive	
		Grand Valley State University	Allendale, Michigan	Active	
Theta Iota	April 7, 2009	Huntingdon College	Montgomery, Alabama	Inactive	
		Illinois Wesleyan University	Bloomington, Illinois	Active	
		Indiana State University	Terre Haute, Indiana	Inactive	
		Indiana University of Pennsylvania	Indiana, Pennsylvania	Inactive	
		Indiana University Bloomington	Bloomington, Indiana	Active	
		Indiana University Southeast	New Albany, Indiana	Active	
		Iowa State University	Ames, Iowa	Inactive	
		Jacksonville State University	Jacksonville, Alabama	Active	
		Kennesaw State University	Cobb County, Georgia	Active	
		Kent State University	Kent, Ohio	Active	
Delta Zeta		Kettering University	Flint, Michigan	Inactive	(Note: Chapter formed at GMI Engineering & Management Institute, now called Kettering University.)
		Kutztown University of Pennsylvania	Kutztown, Pennsylvania	Inactive	
		Lake Forest College	Lake Forest, Illinois	Active	
		Lawrence University	Appleton, Wisconsin	Active	
		Long Island University	New York City, New York	Inactive	
		Longwood College	Farmville, Virginia	Active	
		Lycoming College	Williamsport, Pennsylvania	Inactive	
Beta Gamma	May 2, 1994	Marietta College	Marietta, Ohio	Active	
		McDaniel College	Westminster, Maryland	Inactive	
		Mercer University	Macon, Georgia	Active	
		Miami University	Oxford, Ohio	Inactive	
		Michigan State University	East Lansing, Michigan	Active	
		Michigan Technological University	Houghton, Michigan	Active	
		Midwestern State University	Wichita Falls, Texas	Active	
		Miles College	Fairfield, Alabama	Active	
		Minnesota State University, Mankato	Mankato, Minnesota	Active	
		Monmouth University	West Long Branch, New Jersey	Inactive	
		Moravian College	Bethlehem, Pennsylvania	Inactive	
		Morehead State University	Morehead, Kentucky	Active	
		Murray State University	Murray, Kentucky	Active	
		New England College	Henniker, New Hampshire	Inactive	
		New Jersey City University	Jersey City, New Jersey	Active	
		New Mexico State University	Las Cruces, New Mexico	Inactive	
		New York Institute of Technology	New York City, New York	Active	
		North Carolina Wesleyan University	Rocky Mount, North Carolina	Active	
		Northern Arizona University	Flagstaff, Arizona	Active	
		Northern Illinois University	DeKalb, Illinois	Active	
		Northern Kentucky University	Highland Heights, Kentucky	Active	
		Northwestern State University	Natchitoches, Louisiana	Active	
		Northwestern University	Evanston, Illinois	Active	
	August 31, 2017	Oakland University	Auburn Hills and Rochester Hills, Michigan	Active	
		Occidental College	Los Angeles, California	Active	
		Ohio Northern University	Ada, Ohio	Active	
		Ohio State University	Columbus, Ohio	Active	
		Ohio Wesleyan University	Delaware, Ohio	Inactive	
		Oregon State University	Corvallis, Oregon	Active	
		Pace University	New York City, New York	Inactive	
		Penn West Clarion	Clarion, Pennsylvania	Active	
		Pennsylvania State University	University Park, Pennsylvania	Active	
		Pittsburg State University	Pittsburg, Kansas	Active	
		Purdue University	West Lafayette, Indiana	Active	
		Radford University	Radford, Virginia	Inactive	
		Randolph–Macon College	Ashland, Virginia	Inactive	
		Rider University	Lawrence Township, New Jersey	Inactive	
		Rochester Institute of Technology	Rochester, New York	Active	
		Rutgers University–Camden	Camden, New Jersey	Inactive	
		Rutgers University–New Brunswick	New Brunswick, New Jersey	Inactive	
		Salisbury University	Salisbury, Maryland	Active	
		Samford University	Homewood, Alabama	Inactive	
		San Diego State University	San Diego, California	Active	
		Simpson College	Indianola, Iowa	Active	
		Slippery Rock University	Slippery Rock, Pennsylvania	Active	
		Southeastern Louisiana University	Hammond, Louisiana	Active	
		Southern Connecticut State University	New Haven, Connecticut	Inactive	
		Southern Illinois University, Carbondale	Carbondale, Illinois	Active	
		Southern Methodist University	Dallas, Texas	Active	
		Southern Utah University	Cedar City, Utah	Active	
		Saint Francis University	Loretto, Pennsylvania	Active	
		St. John's University (California)	Temecula, California	Inactive	
		St. John’s University, Queens	Queens, New York	Inactive	
		St. John’s University, Staten Island	Staten Island, New York	Inactive	(Note: The Staten Island campus closed in May 2024.)
		St. Lawrence University	Canton, New York	Inactive	
		St. Mary's University, Texas	San Antonio, Texas	Inactive	
		St. Norbert College	De Pere, Wisconsin	Active	
		State University of New York at Delhi	Delhi, New York	Inactive	
		State University of New York at Plattsburgh	Plattsburgh, New York	Active	
Theta Omega	April 29, 2011	State University of New York at New Paltz	New Paltz, New York	Inactive	
		State University of New York at Oneonta	Oneonta, New York	Active	
		Texas A&M University	College Station, Texas	Active	
		Texas Christian University	Fort Worth, Texas	Inactive	
		Trinity College	Hartford, Connecticut	Inactive	
		Trinity University	San Antonio, Texas	Inactive	
		Truman State University	Kirksville, Missouri	Active	(Note: Chapter formed at Northeast Missouri State, now Truman State University.)
		University at Albany, SUNY	Albany, New York	Inactive	
		University of Akron	Akron, Ohio	Inactive	
		University of Alabama at Birmingham	Birmingham, Alabama	Active	
		University of Arizona	Tucson, Arizona	Active	
		University of Arkansas	Fayetteville, Arkansas	Active	
		University of Arkansas at Little Rock	Little Rock, Arkansas	Active	
		University of Arkansas–Fort Smith	Fort Smith, Arkansas	Inactive	
	November 2017	University of British Columbia	Vancouver, British Columbia, Canada	Inactive	
Gamma Beta	April 10, 1995 – xxxx ?; April 23, 2010	University at Buffalo	Buffalo, New York	Active	
		University of California at Los Angeles	Los Angeles, California	Inactive	
		University of California, Berkeley	Berkeley, California	Active	
		University of California, Irvine	Irvine, California	Inactive	
		University of Central Missouri	Warrensburg, Missouri	Active	
		University of Colorado Boulder	Boulder, Colorado	Active	
		University of Connecticut	Storrs, Connecticut	Inactive	
		University of Denver	Denver, Colorado	Active	
		University of Evansville	Evansville, Indiana	Active	
		University of Florida	Gainesville, Florida	Active	
		University of Houston	Houston, Texas	Active	
		University of Idaho	Moscow, Idaho	Active	
		University of Illinois Champaign-Urbana	Champaign and Urbana, Illinois	Active	
		University of Iowa	Iowa City, Iowa	Active	
		University of Kansas	Lawrence, Kansas	Active	
		University of Maryland, Baltimore	Baltimore, Maryland	Active	
		University of Maryland, College Park	College Park, Maryland	Active	
		University of Miami	Coral Gables, Florida	Inactive	
		University of Michigan	Ann Arbor, Michigan	Inactive	
		University of Minnesota	Minneapolis and Saint Paul, Minnesota	Active	
		University of Mississippi	University, Mississippi	Inactive	
		University of Missouri	Columbia, Missouri	Active	
		University of Mount Union	Alliance, Ohio	Active	
		University of Nevada, Las Vegas	Paradise, Nevada	Active	
		University of Nevada, Reno	Reno, Nevada	Inactive	
		University of New Haven	West Haven, Connecticut	Inactive	
		University of New Mexico	Albuquerque, New Mexico	Active	
Theta Eta		University of North Alabama	Florence, Alabama	Active	
		University of North Carolina at Chapel Hill	Chapel Hill, North Carolina	Inactive	
		University of North Carolina at Greensboro	Greensboro, North Carolina	Active	
		University of North Carolina Wilmington	Wilmington, North Carolina	Active	
		University of North Dakota	Grand Forks, North Dakota	Inactive	
		University of North Florida	Jacksonville, Florida	Active	
		University of North Georgia	Dahlonega, Georgia	Active	
		University of North Texas	Denton, Texas	Active	
		University of Northern Colorado	Greeley, Colorado	Active	
		University of Oklahoma	Norman, Oklahoma	Active	
		University of Pennsylvania	Philadelphia, Pennsylvania	Active	
		University of Pittsburgh	Pittsburgh, Pennsylvania	Inactive	
		University of Pittsburgh at Bradford	Bradford, Pennsylvania	Inactive	
		University of Puget Sound	Tacoma, Washington	Active	
		University of Redlands	Redlands, California	Inactive	
		University of San Francisco	San Francisco, California	Active	
		University of South Alabama	Mobile, Alabama	Active	
		University of South Carolina	Columbia, South Carolina	Active	
		University of South Florida	Tampa, Florida	Active	
Alpha	November 9, 1989	University of Southern California	Los Angeles, California	Inactive	
		University of Southern Indiana	Evansville, Indiana	Active	
		University of Southern Mississippi	Hattiesburg, Mississippi	Active	
		University of Tennessee at Martin	Martin, Tennessee	Active	
		University of Texas at Arlington	Arlington, Texas	Active	
		University of Texas at Austin	Austin, Texas	Active	
		University of Texas–Pan American	Edinburg, Texas	Active	
		University of the Pacific	Stockton, California	Active	
		University of Toledo	Toledo, Ohio	Inactive	
		University of Vermont	Burlington, Vermont	Inactive	
		University of Virginia's College at Wise	Wise, Virginia	Inactive	
		University of Washington	Seattle, Washington	Active	
		University of West Alabama	Livingston, Alabama	Active	
		University of West Georgia	Carrollton, Georgia	Active	
		University of Wisconsin–Madison	Madison, Wisconsin	Active	
		University of Wisconsin–Oshkosh	Oshkosh, Wisconsin	Active	
		University of Wisconsin–Platteville	Platteville, Wisconsin	Active	
		University of Wisconsin–Stevens Point	Stevens Point, Wisconsin	Active	
		Ursinus College	Collegeville, Pennsylvania	Active	
		Valdosta State University	Valdosta, Georgia	Active	
		Valparaiso University	Valparaiso, Indiana	Active	
		Virginia Tech	Blacksburg, Virginia	Inactive	
		Virginia Wesleyan University	Virginia Beach, Virginia	Active	
		Washburn University	Topeka, Kansas	Inactive	
		Washington & Jefferson College	Washington, Pennsylvania	Inactive	
		Washington State University	Pullman, Washington	Active	
		Washington University in St. Louis	St. Louis, Missouri	Active	
		Wayne State University	Detroit, Michigan	Active	
		Weber State University	Ogden, Utah	Active	
		West Chester University	West Chester, Pennsylvania	Active	
		West Virginia University	Morgantown, West Virginia	Inactive	
		West Virginia Wesleyan College	Buckhannon, West Virginia	Active	
		Western Illinois University	Macomb, Illinois	Active	
Eta Eta	November 2004	Western Kentucky University	Bowling Green, Kentucky	Inactive	
		Western Michigan University	Kalamazoo, Michigan	Active	
		Willamette University	Salem, Oregon	Active	
		Wittenberg University	Springfield, Ohio	Inactive	
		Woodbury University	Burbank, California	Active	

== Notable members ==
- Camille Vasquez, lawyer

== See also ==
- Honor cords
