= Richard Marks (disambiguation) =

Richard, Rick, or Dick Marks may refer to:

- Richard Marks (1943–2018), American film editor
- Richard Marks (art historian), British art historian
- Richard Marks (judge), British Crown Court judge
- Richard Marks (lawyer), American entertainment lawyer
- Dick Marks (born 1942), Australian rugby union player and administrator

== See also ==
- Richard Marx (born 1963), American singer-songwriter
- Dick Marx (1924–1997), American jazz pianist, father of Richard Marx
- Mark Richards (disambiguation)
