= Azcárate =

Azcárate is a Spanish and Basque surname, common in Navarra and Guipúzcoa. The name may mean "High, rocky mountain pass." Azcárate is also found in Mexico City, Chihuahua, and Coahuila. Also spelled Escarate and Ascarate. Notable people with this surname include:

- Federico Azcárate (born 1984), Argentine footballer
- Gumersindo de Azcárate (1840–1917), Spanish philosopher
- Juan Francisco Azcárate (1896–1987), Mexican military figure and TNCA aircraft designer
- Juan Francisco Azcárate y Ledesma (1760–1814), Mexican lawyer
- Justino de Azcárate (1903–1989), Spanish lawyer and politician
- Manuel Azcárate 1916–1998), Spanish journalist and politician
- Pablo de Azcárate (1890–1971), Spanish diplomat
- Penney S. Azcarate, American judge
