= Skull and Dagger (honor society) =

Student society at the University of Southern California

- Founded: 1913; 113 years ago University of Southern California
- Type: Secret
- Affiliation: Independent
- Status: Active
- Emphasis: Seniors
- Scope: Local
- Chapters: 1
- Headquarters: Los Angeles, California; United States
- Website: Official website

Skull and Dagger Society is the oldest secret honor society at the University of Southern California.

== History ==
Hallam H. Anderson and Cloyd H. Marvin founded Skull and Dagger Society at the University of Southern California in 1913. The Society is primarily for graduating seniors consisting of leaders, scholars, and student-athletes.

== Traditions ==
The society is known for its tradition of secrecy and discretion, and its members are sworn to keep the group's activities and identity confidential.

Newly inducted members each year pull a prank on the University and the student body. In the past, members have pranked the school by announcing an on campus early screening of the Star Wars Episode I trailer, only to greet the hundreds of students lined up outside the auditorium with U-Haul trailer with a poster that read: "Star Wars Trailer--Episode 1."Another notable prank includes the Society's 1997 prank, where it staged a memorial for Traveler IV, the University's horse mascot. During the event, a trailer supposedly containing the replacement of Traveler IV arrived only to reveal a donkey, wrapped in a banner that read, "Traveler IV is alive. Don't you feel like an ass?" Recently, the Society has been criticized for its annual prank practice with opponents stating that some of the pranks "damage the trustworthiness and credibility of respected campus services."

On the day of the prank the newly initiated members reveal themselves wearing odd hats and tailcoats.

== Activities ==
The Skull and Dagger Society is known for its involvement in many important USC events and traditions, such as the homecoming parade and the senior class gift. Members of the society also participate in community service projects and charitable activities.

== Philanthropy ==
=== Gifts to USC ===
Skull and Dagger has made gifts to the University. In 1994, the Society donated "The Wall of Scholars" to honor students who have won national and international fellowships, as well as recipients of USC awards. In 2011, the Society embarked to restore the University's class marker tradition and has been donating class markers ever since.

== Skull and Dagger Foundation Scholarships ==
The Skull and Dagger Foundation administers a set of annual scholarships for continuing USC students (graduate or undergraduate) who have demonstrated significant campus and/or community leadership.

=== Named scholarships ===
As of 2025, the Foundation awards the following scholarships:

- Dr. Kenneth Owler Smith Memorial Scholarship
- Dr. Harrison M. Kurtz Memorial Scholarship
- Barden Centennial Scholarship
- William I. Griffith Memorial Scholarship
- Dr. Robert R. Sr. & Marjorie M. LaBriola Memorial Scholarship

=== Award details ===
Each scholarship is awarded annually to one or more deserving USC students. Applicants must be continuing students (undergraduate or graduate) and demonstrate strong campus or community leadership.

== Membership ==
Membership in Skull and Dagger is selective and is offered to USC students and alumni who have demonstrated leadership, service, and achievement in their academic, personal, and professional lives.

== Notable members ==
Notable members include:

Alumni

- Erik Affholter
- Neil Armstrong
- Matt Barkley
- Reggie Bush
- Rick Caruso
- Anthony Davis
- Pat Haden
- Larsen Jensen
- Keyshawn Johnson
- Herb Klein
- Paul Krekorian
- Kenneth T. Norris Jr.
- Bill Sharman
- Brad Thor
- Camille Vasquez
- John Wayne
- Jesse Williams
- Gin D. Wong

Faculty

- Richard Dekmejian
- James G. Ellis
- Hilton A. Green
- Art Mazmanian
- Steven B. Sample
- Kevin Starr
- Norman Topping
- Marvalee Wake
- Rufus B. von KleinSmid

== See also ==
- Collegiate secret societies in North America
