= Kenneth T. Norris Jr. =

American industrialist and philanthropist (1930–1996)

- Born: Kenneth True Norris Jr. August 16, 1930; Los Angeles
- Died: September 21, 1996 (age 66); Lake Arrowhead, California, US
- Body discovered: By surfers
- Resting place: Forest Lawn Memorial Park, Glendale, California
- Education: B.S. industrial management
- Alma mater: University of Southern California (USC) 1953
- Occupation: Philanthropist
- Years active: 1975 to 1980
- Employer: Norris Industries
- Spouse(s): Alice Kelley and Harlyne Joyce Whitlock
- Children: 5

Kenneth True Norris Jr. (August 16, 1930 – September 21, 1996) was an American industrialist and philanthropist who lived in Huntington Beach, California.

== Early life ==
Norris was born August 16, 1930, in Los Angeles, California, to Kenneth True Norris Sr. (born July 8, 1899, in East St. Louis, Illinois, died March 24, 1972, in California) and Eileen Lunsford.

He grew up in Glendale, La Cañada Flintridge and San Marino. He started working at age 10 in a bowling alley in Lake Arrowhead.

== Education ==
Norris attended Stanford University until he lost sight in one eye while boxing at age 18. After taking some time off, he transferred to University of Southern California (USC) in 1952, there he received a B.S. in industrial management in 1953. As an undergraduate, he was a member of Beta Gamma Sigma national scholastic honorary fraternity, Blue Key national men's honorary leadership fraternity and Skull & Dagger fraternity. Norris was a two-year letterman on the USC Trojan crew and was team captain in his senior year.

== Air Force ==
From 1954 to 1956, Norris served with the 12th Air Force in Germany as a fighter-interceptor-controller.

== Norris Industries ==
In 1930, his father, Kenneth T. Norris Sr. created the beginnings of Norris Industries with a metal stamping business with 15 employees and 7, 000 square feet of space. The company was the first to create a seamless bullet cartridge and they became the largest supplier of ammunition to the United States for World War II. He recognized that the war would not last forever and he prepared for peace and prosperity by acquiring companies that produced items such as sinks, toilets and locks for homes. This included companies such as Thermador, Weiser door locks, Artistic Brass hardware and Waste King dishwashers.

The son, Kenneth Norris Jr., began his career at Norris Industries in 1944, when he was 14, working a summer job in the mailroom and stockroom. He continued to work at the company every holiday and summer vacation, as the company grew to 13 divisions with international operations. Such jobs as loading boxcars and operating machinery made him familiar with every production department. He worked at Norris Industries until the firm was sold in 1981. He became president of the company in 1965, chief executive officer in 1969 and chairman of the board in 1972. The company grew, both through internal expansion and a process of selective acquisition, into a company with 16 divisions, some 12,000 employees and record sales for 1973 exceeding $375 million. These divisions included Price Pfister.

=== Support for motor racing ===
While Norris Jr. chaired the board, the company supported entries on virtually every major racing circuit in North America, from the US Auto Club Championship trail to the NASCAR Grand National Stock Car circuit and both the Trans-Am and Can-Am series. In 1974 the Norris Industries Formula 5000 team consisted of Sam Posey, Jon Woodner and Skip Barber driving Norris Talons. The Talon were built by Jack McCormack; they weighed 1450 lb and could accelerate from zero to sixty miles per hour in 3. 1 seconds. The Talon is powered by a 305 cubic inch stock block and a Chevrolet V-8 type engine capable of supplying 550 horsepower.

The first race was in Mid-Ohio, 2 Jun 1974. Woodner came 15th and Posey came 18th. The second race was at Mosport Park, 15 Jun 1974, where Posey came 15th and Woodner came 20th. In the third race at Watkins Glen, 14 Jul 1974, Posey came 5th and Woodner came 23rd. At Road America, 28 Jul 1974, Woodner came 6th and Posey came 23rd. At the fifth race at Ontario Motor Speedway, 1 Sep 1974, Woodner came 8th and Posey came 10th. Woodner came 6th Posey came 22nd and Barber did not qualify from heats at the 6th race in Laguna Seca, 13 Oct 1974. The last race was at Riverside, 27 Oct 1974, where Posey came 20th and Woodner 24th.

Norris Industries also sponsored the Bud Moore Ford Torino racing entry in the NASCAR Cup series, starting with the 1975 series finale LA Times 500 race at Ontario Motor Speedway, which was promptly won by Moore's driver, Buddy Baker. Baker then went on to also win the 1976 Winston 500 at Talladega Superspeedway before leaving Moore's team after the end of the 1977 season. Bobby Allison then moved over to Bud Moore's team for 1978, scoring his first of 3 Daytona 500 victories in Moore's Ford Thunderbird, along with 4 more races that season. The final race that Norris Industries was the primary sponsor for Allison & Moore was the 1979 NASCAR season opener at Riverside International Raceway.

== Philanthropy ==
Norris was perhaps most well known for his philanthropy, particularly in the Los Angeles area. Norris continued the philanthropic actions of his parents who had set up the Kenneth T. and Eileen L. Norris Foundation, where William G. Corey M.D was medical advisor and trustee. The foundation contributed to the construction of the USC Kenneth T. Norris Jr. Comprehensive Cancer Center and Hospital. The university had initially sought public financing for the project, but turned to the philanthropic of benefactors such as the Norris family when the funding measure was defeated by voters. Norris gave $500,000 of his own money to the comprehensive cancer center at USC and persuaded the Norris Foundation to donate $3.5 million to the project, which he was heading at the time. A further $1 million challenge grant was given. Although other donors contributed, Norris was the most influential benefactor and the eight-story building was dedicated to him on February 3, 1983. Since that time, the Kenneth T. and Eileen L. Norris Foundation has made several additional contributions to the cancer center, including a $15 million gift in 2012. "Mr. Norris used to say he wouldn't rest until cancer is a disease of the past, and we will continue in that spirit," said Peter A. Jones, director of the USC/Kenneth T. Norris Comprehensive Cancer Center and Hospital.

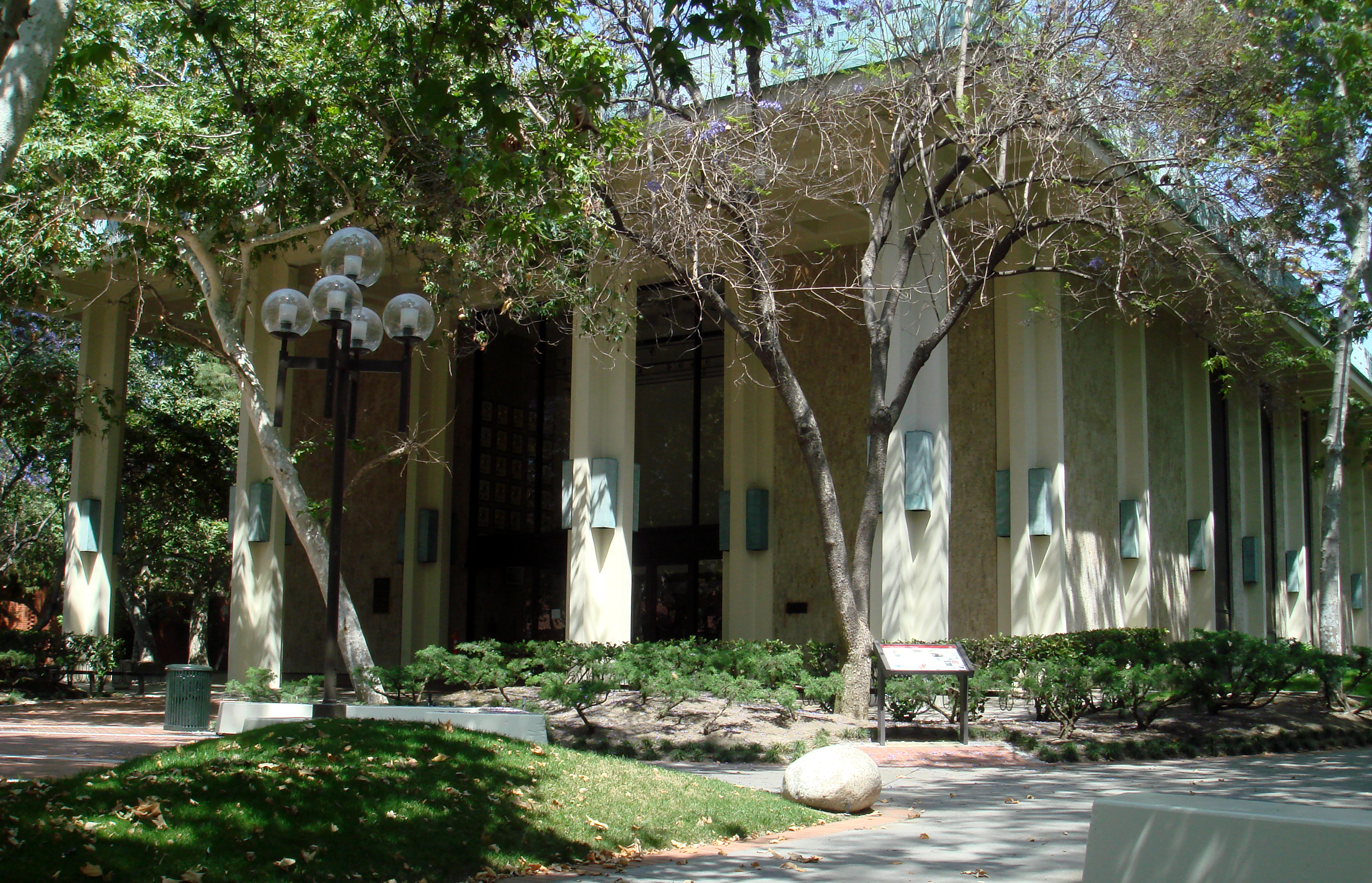
The Eileen L. Norris Cinema Theatre, where the THX sound system was first developed and installed by Tomlinson Holman.

The foundation also made substantial gifts to the Huntington Library, KCET TV station and $1 million to help build the 450-seat Norris Theatre in Rolling Hills Estates, on the northern side of Palos Verdes Peninsula in 1983. In 1990 Dick Moe, then Chairman of the Management Board, formed a committee to obtain property and raise the start-up capital to build the Harlyne J. Norris Pavilion. The new facility was to house the business offices, provide class space for the education department (including a dance studio), a scene shop, a catering kitchen and a multi purpose room for performances, rehearsals and needed to be large enough for a 300 person sit-down dinner. The Norris Foundation provided a million dollars as a lead gift and the 14,000 square foot Harlyne J. Norris Pavilion opened in November 1999. The two facilities combined comprise the Norris Center for the Performing Arts and are a designated, non-profit, 501(c)(3) organization. The Peninsula Education Foundation was founded in 1979 as a 501 (c) (3) nonprofit corporation with a leadership gift of $50,000 from the Kenneth T. and Eileen L. Norris Foundation. The purpose of PEF was to raise money to maintain, provide and enhance vital education programs in PVPUSD when Proposition 13 severely altered the funding of public schools in California. The foundation also supports the Discovery Science Center, the Shriners Hospital for Children- Los Angeles, Team Prime Time at Emerson Middle School, the Museum of Making Music, Special Olympics Southern California School Partnership Program, and the Fresh Start Clinic at Rady Children's Hospital. In 2003 they gave $10,000 to Midnight Mission. and another $10,000 to TreePeople.

In sum, before his death, it was estimated by the Los Angeles Times that Norris and his family had contributed more than $70 million to charities and institutions in the Southern California area. Kenneth Norris Jr.'s parents (Eileen and Kenneth True Norris) had previously given gifts to USC funding facilities such as the Norris Medical Library, the Eileen L. Norris Cinema Theatre and the Norris Dental Center.

== Private life ==
Norris death certificate.

He was married to, and had two children, Bradley Kenneth Norris and Dale Norris, with the actress Alice Amanda Kelley, (as Alice Kelley who played in Against All Flags (1952) the Princess Patma, a Handmaiden in The Golden Blade (1953), a Stewardess in Ma and Pa Kettle on Vacation (1953). They divorced in 1973.

On September 21, 1996, Norris fell overboard while flying a kite from his boat on Lake Arrowhead. Surfers later found his body floating on the water. Apparently he fell off the boat while having a heart attack at age 66.
