= Depp v. Heard =

2022 defamation trial of American actors

- Court: Fairfax County Circuit Court
- Full case name: John C. Depp, II v. Amber Laura Heard
- Started: April 11, 2022
- Decided: June 1, 2022; 4 years ago
- Verdict: Depp's complaint: Heard was found liable in all three matters of defamation raised. Depp was awarded $10 million (of the $50 million claim) in compensatory damages and $5 million in punitive damages, reduced to $350,000 per state limit

Court membership
- Judges sitting: Penney S. Azcarate (Bruce D. White ruled on pre-trial motions).

John C. Depp, II v. Amber Laura Heard was a trial held in Fairfax County, Virginia, from April 11 to June 1, 2022, that ruled on allegations of defamation between formerly married American actors Johnny Depp and Amber Heard. Depp, as plaintiff, filed a complaint of defamation against defendant Heard claiming $50 million in damages; Heard filed counterclaims against Depp claiming $100 million in damages. Depp won the trial and was awarded $10,350,000; Heard succeeded on one of her counterclaims, and was awarded $2 million.

Depp and Heard first met in 2009 and got married in February 2015. Heard filed for divorce in May 2016, claiming that Depp had abused her physically, which he denied. The couple's divorce was finalized in January 2017. In the High Court of Justice in London, Depp sued News Group Newspapers Ltd for libel over an article published in The Sun that claimed he had assaulted Heard. In November 2020, the presiding judge ruled against Depp, stating, "[T]he great majority of alleged assaults of Ms. Heard by Mr. Depp have been proved to the civil standard." Several legal experts suggested that Depp had a smaller chance of winning in the American trial compared to the British trial.

In the Virginia trial, Depp's claims related to a December 2018 op-ed by Heard, published in The Washington Post. Depp claimed Heard caused new damage to his reputation and career by stating that she had spoken up against "sexual violence" and "faced our culture's wrath"; that "two years ago, [she] became a public figure representing domestic abuse" and "felt the full force of our culture's wrath for women who speak out"; and that she "had the rare vantage point of seeing, in real time, how institutions protect men accused of abuse". Heard's counterclaims included allegations that Adam Waldman, Depp's former lawyer, had defamed her in statements published in the Daily Mail in 2020. Throughout the trial, Depp's legal team sought to disprove Heard's domestic abuse allegations and to demonstrate that she had been the instigator, rather than the victim, of intimate partner violence. Heard's lawyers defended the op-ed, claiming it to be factual and protected by the First Amendment.

The jury found that Heard's op-ed references to "sexual violence" and "domestic abuse" were false and defamed Depp with actual malice. It awarded Depp $10 million in compensatory damages and $5 million in punitive damages from Heard, although the court reduced the punitive damages to $350,000 due to a limit imposed by Virginia state law. It also found that Depp had defamed Heard through Waldman, who had falsely alleged that Heard and her friends "roughed up" Depp's penthouse as part of an "ambush, a hoax". It awarded Heard $2 million in compensatory damages and $0 in punitive damages from Depp. Separately, the jury found that Waldman's other allegations of Heard's "sexual violence hoax" and "abuse hoax" against Depp had not been proven defamatory.

Depp's victory in Virginia was attributed by some to the fact that he got a jury trial, which may be why he and his legal team sought to have the trial in Virginia to begin with. After the trial ended, Heard put forth motions to set aside the verdict, but was unsuccessful. Then, both Depp and Heard appealed against the respective verdicts. In December 2022, both parties reached a settlement and dropped their appeals, with Depp's lawyers Benjamin Chew and Camille Vasquez stating that Depp would receive $1 million from Heard.

The livestreamed trial attracted large numbers of viewers and considerable social media response, most of which was sympathetic to Depp and critical of Heard. The trial renewed debates around topics relating to domestic violence, domestic violence against men, the #MeToo movement, and women's rights, although some commentators were skeptical of the trial's long-term implications.

== Background ==
=== Depp and Heard's relationship ===
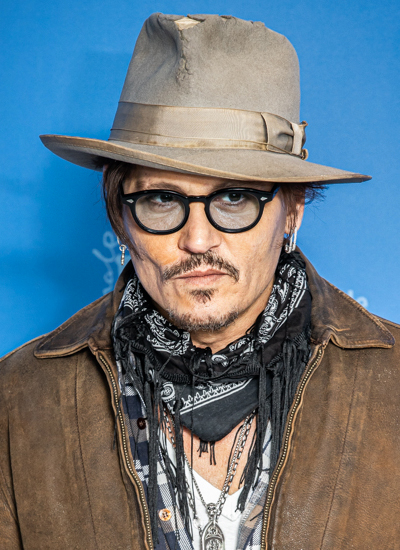
Johnny Depp

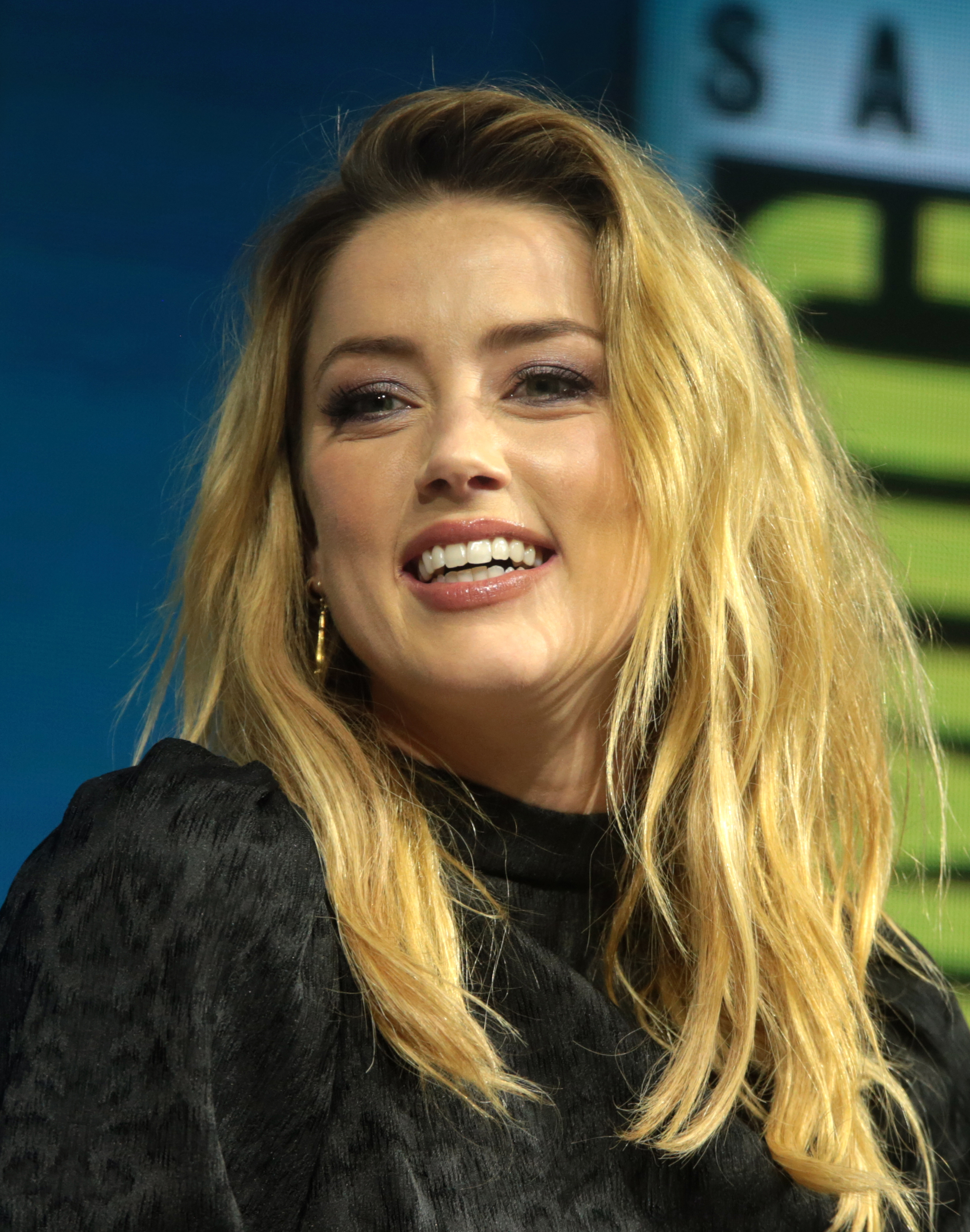
Amber Heard

The two actors met in 2009 while filming The Rum Diary; according to Heard, their relationship began "around the end of 2011 or early 2012". They were engaged in January 2014, and, in February 2015, they married on Depp's private island in The Bahamas, Little Hall's Pond Cay. Heard filed for divorce on May 23, 2016, and obtained a temporary restraining order against Depp. She also requested $50,000 a month in spousal support, which was denied. In response, Depp alleged that she was "attempting to secure a premature financial resolution by alleging abuse". Heard testified about the alleged abuse in a deposition during their divorce litigation, alleging that Depp had been "verbally and physically abusive" throughout their relationship, usually while under the influence of alcohol or drugs. In light of the publicity, images of Heard's alleged injuries were published by the media.

A settlement was reached in August 2016, and the divorce was finalized in January 2017. Heard withdrew the restraining order, and she and Depp released a joint statement stating that their relationship was "intensely passionate and periodically volatile, but always bound by love. Neither party has made false accusations for financial gain. There was never any intent of physical or emotional harm."

Depp paid Heard a divorce settlement of $7 million, which she pledged to donate to the American Civil Liberties Union and the Children's Hospital Los Angeles. The settlement included a non-disclosure agreement (NDA) preventing either party from discussing their relationship publicly. As of April 2022, Heard had paid less than half of what she promised to the ACLU from her divorce settlement over five years prior. Much of what she had paid to that point was thought by the ACLU to have actually come from Elon Musk and Depp himself instead of Heard.

=== Depp v News Group Newspapers Ltd ===
In April 2018, British tabloid The Sun published an article with an online title that described Depp as a "wife beater", and, in June 2018, Depp sued News Group Newspapers, the publisher of The Sun, and then executive editor Dan Wootton for libel. Both Depp and Heard testified in the July 2020 trial, which focused on evaluating 14 alleged incidents of abuse. In November 2020, Judge Andrew Nicol ruled in favor of the publisher, finding that the great majority of Depp's alleged assaults had been proven to a civil standard and, therefore, the paper's characterization of Depp was "substantially true". The verdict found that Depp had assaulted Heard in 12 of the 14 alleged incidents and put her in fear of her life. Judge Nicol rejected Depp's contention that Heard was a "gold-digger", saying in his ruling: "Her donation of the seven million US dollars to charity is hardly the act one would expect of a gold-digger." Heard later claimed in the 2022 Virginia trial that she was scheduled to pay the entire pledged donation within 10 years and that she was behind her payment schedule because of Depp's suits against her.

After the verdict, Depp resigned from the Fantastic Beasts film series at the request of Warner Bros., the film's production company. In March 2021, the Court of Appeal rejected Depp's request to appeal the verdict, concluding that the appeal had "no real prospect of success". Lawyers for Depp had argued that he had not received a fair hearing, that Heard was an unreliable witness and that recently discovered evidence contradicts Heard's assertion about her donation of the divorce settlement sum, arguing that the Judge in deciding the case, gave great weight to Heard's testimony that she donated all her $7 million divorce settlement to charity. But the appeals judges concluded he had a "full and fair" trial, and that "the judge based his conclusions on each of the incidents on his extremely detailed review of the evidence specific to each incident [...] in an approach of that kind there was little need or room for the judge to give weight to any general assessment of Ms. Heard's credibility."

=== Heard's op-ed in The Washington Post ===
In December 2018, The Washington Post published an op-ed written by Heard and titled "Amber Heard: I spoke up against sexual violence—and faced our culture's wrath. That has to change." In the article, Heard stated: "Then two years ago, I became a public figure representing domestic abuse, and I felt the full force of our culture's wrath for women who speak out. [...] I had the rare vantage point of seeing, in real time, how institutions protect men accused of abuse." She further stated that, as a result of this, she had lost a film role and an advertising campaign for a global fashion brand. The op-ed called for Congress to re-authorize the Violence Against Women Act and did not explicitly mention Depp by name.

=== Waldman's comments in the Daily Mail ===
Matters from Heard's counterclaims pursued through the trial related to three statements made by Depp's lawyer, Adam Waldman, and published by the Daily Mail in April and June 2020.

First, Waldman stated that "Amber Heard and her friends in the media used fake sexual violence allegations as both sword and shield, depending on their needs. They have selected some of her sexual violence hoax 'facts' as the sword, inflicting them on the public and Mr. Depp."

Waldman's second statement regarded a 2016 incident in Depp and Heard's Hollywood penthouse: "Quite simply this was an ambush, a hoax. They set Mr. Depp up by calling the cops but the first attempt didn't do the trick. The officers came to the penthouses, thoroughly searched and interviewed, and left after seeing no damage to face or property. So, Amber and her friends spilled a little wine and roughed the place up, got their stories straight under the direction of a lawyer and publicist, and then placed a second call to 911."

Third, Waldman stated: "We have reached the beginning of the end of Ms. Heard's abuse hoax against Johnny Depp."

== Civil action ==
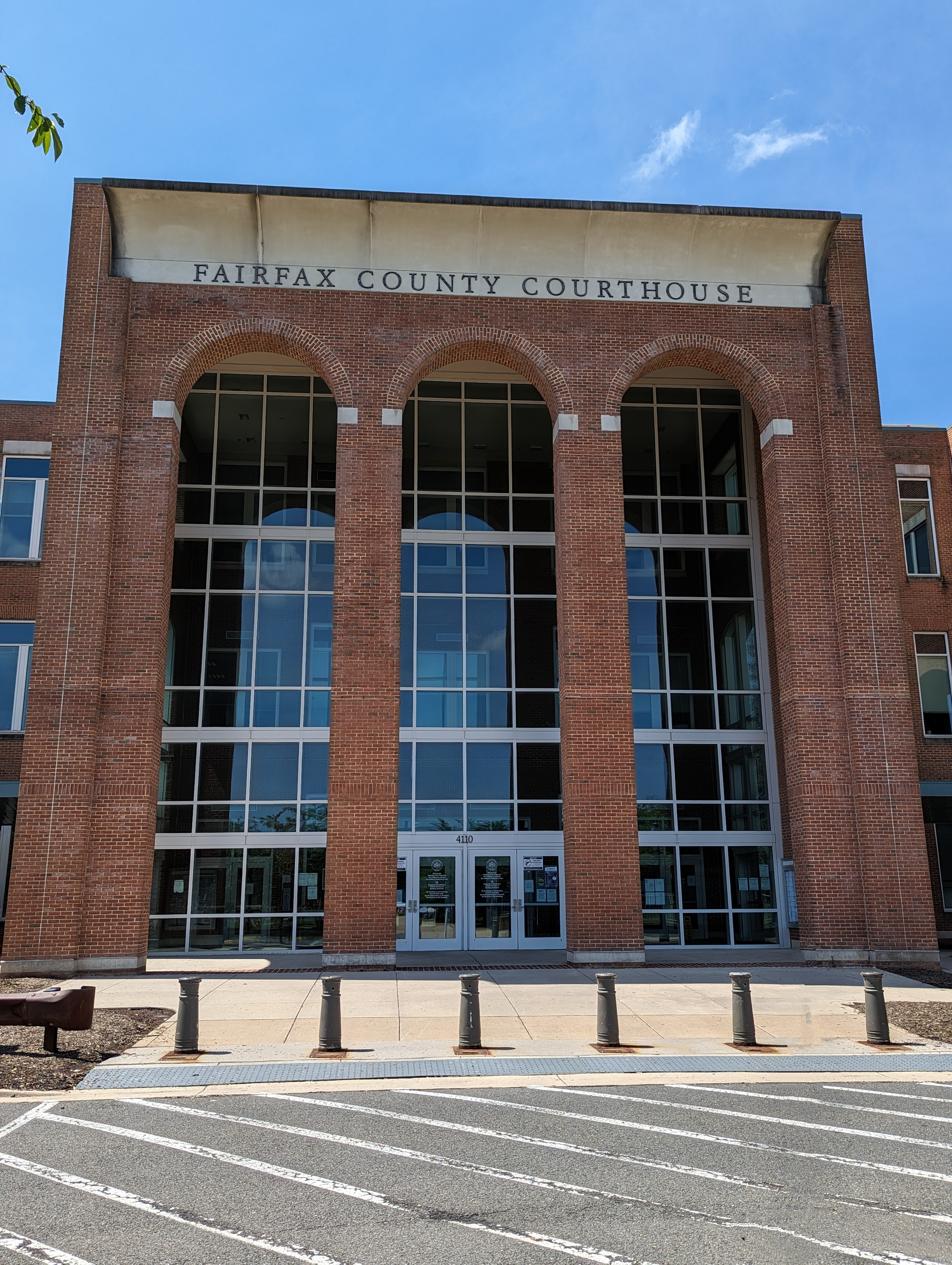
Fairfax Courthouse main entrance

In February 2019, Depp sued Heard over her December 2018 op-ed in The Washington Post. Depp claimed that Heard's allegations were part of an elaborate hoax against him and repeated his allegation that Heard had been the one who violently abused him. In August 2020, Heard countersued Depp over the three statements made by his attorney Adam Waldman. The trial was held at the Fairfax County Circuit Court. The location was chosen on the basis that the online edition and the print edition of The Washington Post' op-ed are published in the county.

=== Pre-trial developments ===
In June 2020, several lawyers withdrew from Heard's legal team with her endorsement, including Time's Up founder, Roberta Kaplan. In October 2020, the judge ruling on early pre-trial motions revoked permission for lawyer Adam Waldman to represent Depp in Virginia after Waldman leaked confidential information covered by a protective order to the media.

In August 2021, a New York judge ruled that the American Civil Liberties Union (ACLU) had to disclose documents related to Heard's charity pledge to the organization for which the ACLU would later demand payment. Also in August 2021, Judge Penney S. Azcarate overruled a plea filed by Heard's lawyers for having the defamation suit dismissed on the basis of the verdict in Depp's lawsuit against the publishers of The Sun, with Azcarate citing that: Heard had been a witness in the UK case (as opposed to a defendant), the facts alleged were different (Heard's allegedly defamatory statements were made after the English case commenced), and the parties had not been subject to the same discovery procedures as in the United States.

In February 2022, over objections from Heard, Azcarate ordered to permit the broadcast of courtroom proceedings. Depp's lawyer Benjamin Chew welcomed the cameras and stated that "Mr. Depp believes in transparency." Judge Azcarate, who worried that reporters might otherwise have come to the courthouse and potentially create hazardous conditions, said, "I don't see any good cause not to do it."

=== Trial ===
On April 11, 2022, the trial began in Fairfax County, Virginia, with a day to finalize jury selection. The trial ended in June 2022.

==== Opening statements ====
Opening statements were made on April 12, 2022. Lawyers representing Depp accused Heard of fabricating domestic abuse accusations against Depp to further her career, saying that Heard made such allegations because Depp had asked for a divorce, and they further accused Heard of being the actual abuser in the relationship. They argued that, while Heard's 2018 op-ed did not mention Depp, it was clear by implication that it referred to him, and that Heard's writing in the piece ("Then two years ago, I became a public figure representing domestic abuse") was a reference to her May 2016 restraining order request, in which she alleged that Depp had physically abused her. Depp's lawyers discussed Heard appearing in public with a bruised face on May 27, 2016, accusing her of staging the injury, citing that Depp had not met her since May 21, 2016, and that his witnesses had seen her without the injury in the days between May 21, 2016, and May 27, 2016. They also discussed several instances in which Depp alleges Heard instigated physical violence against him.

Heard's lawyers claimed that Depp had physically and sexually abused Heard on multiple occasions throughout their relationship, usually triggered by his addiction to both alcohol and drugs. They accused Depp of seeking to "humiliate [Heard], haunt her, wreck her career" with the Virginia lawsuit and to turn the case into a "soap opera". They further argued that the First Amendment protected Heard's right to express her views in the op-ed, which was mostly focused on a broad discussion of domestic violence and did not explicitly mention Depp's name. Finally, Heard's lawyers stated that the allegations had not changed Depp's reputation, as they had become public knowledge two years prior to the op-ed, and that Depp had instead ruined his Hollywood career himself with his drinking and drug use; this made him "unreliable" in the eyes of major film studios.

==== Testimony ====
Witness lists were submitted by both parties, prior to trial.

Witness testimony began on April 12, following the parties' presentation of their opening statements, and ended on May 26.

List of witnesses called by Depp for trial testimony from April 12, 2022.
Christi Dembrowski, Depp's sister and personal manager.

Isaac Baruch, Depp's neighbor during his marriage to Heard.

Brandon Patterson, the general manager of the Eastern Columbia Building.

Kate James, Heard's former personal assistant.

Laurel Anderson, Depp and Heard's therapist in 2015.

David Kipper, Depp's private physician.

Debbie Lloyd, who worked with Kipper as a nurse.

Sean Bett, Depp's security guard.

Keenan Wyatt, Depp's on-set audio technician since the 1990s.

Johnny Depp, plaintiff and counterclaim defendant.

Ben King, Depp's former house manager.

Tara Roberts, who had been the manager of Depp's island in the Bahamas at the time of the relationship.

Shannon Curry, a forensic psychologist hired by Depp's team.

Testimony of police officers, who had responded to a May 2016 incident between the couple.

Alejandro Romero, who works at the front desk of the Eastern Columbia Building in Downtown Los Angeles.

Christian Carino, who had previously been an agent for both Depp and Heard.

Laura Wasser, a divorce lawyer who represented Depp in 2016.

Terrence Dougherty, chief operating officer of the American Civil Liberties Union testified.

Edward White, Depp's accountant.

Malcolm Connelly, a security guard of Depp's.

Starling Jenkins, another of Depp's security guards.

Travis McGivern, Depp's bodyguard.

Jack Whigham, Depp's agent since October 2016.

Richard Marks, an entertainment lawyer.

Doug Bania, an intellectual property expert.

Erin Falati, Heard's nurse during the relationship.

Michael Spindler, an economic damages expert.

List of witnesses called by Heard for trial testimony from May 3, 2022.
Dawn Hughes, a board-certified forensic psychologist who was hired by Heard's legal team as an expert in traumatic stress, violence, and abuse.

Amber Heard, defendant and counterclaim plaintiff.

iO Tillett Wright, who had been a friend of Heard and who lived in one of Depp's penthouses in the Eastern Columbia Building.

Raquel Pennington, who had been Heard's friend and who lived in one of Depp's penthouses.

Joshua Drew, who was Pennington's fiancé at the time.

Elizabeth Marz, an acquaintance of Heard.

Whitney Henriquez, Heard's younger sister.

Melanie Inglessis, Heard's former make-up artist and friend.

Kristina Sexton, Heard's former acting coach.

Bruce Witkin, Depp's longtime friend.

Tracey Jacobs, a UTA agent who represented Depp from the 1990s until 2016.

Joel Mandel, Depp's former business manager.

Ellen Barkin, who had a brief sexual relationship with Depp and had appeared with him in Fear and Loathing in Las Vegas (1998).

Michele Mulroney, Heard's former lawyer.

Tina Newman, a production executive representing Disney.

Adam Waldman, Depp's lawyer.

Jessica Kovacevic, Heard's former agent.

Ron Schnell, an expert witness on social-media data analysis.

Alan Blaustein, Depp's former psychiatrist.

Richard Moore, an orthopedic surgeon called as an expert witness.

David Spiegel, a psychiatrist called as an expert witness.

Kathryn Arnold, an entertainment analyst called as an expert witness.

List of witnesses called by Depp in rebuttal for trial testimony from May 24, 2022.
Walter Hamada, the president of DC Films.

David A. Kulber, the surgeon who reconstructed Depp's finger in March 2015.

Richard Marks, entertainment lawyer and Hollywood expert.

Michael Spindler, an economic damages expert.

Douglas Bania, an intellectual property expert.

Morgan Night, the owner of a trailer park in Joshua Tree where Depp and Heard spent a night in May 2013.

Richard Shaw, a psychiatrist.

Jennifer Howell, the founder of The Art of Elysium and former friend of Heard's sister Whitney Henriquez.

Candie Davidson-Goldbronn, of the Children's Hospital Los Angeles (CHLA).

Kate Moss, model who had a past relationship with Depp.

Shannon Curry, a forensic psychologist hired by Depp's team.

Johnny Depp, plaintiff and counterclaim defendant.

Morgan Tremaine, a former employee of celebrity website TMZ.

Bryan Neumeister, a forensic and metadata specialist.

Beverly Leonard, an employee of the Seattle-Tacoma International Airport at the time of an alleged incident in 2009.

List of witnesses called by Heard in rebuttal for trial testimony on May 26, 2022.
Julian Ackert, a computer forensic investigator.

Dawn Hughes, a board-certified forensic psychologist.

Amber Heard, defendant and counterclaim plaintiff.

==== Closing arguments ====
Following the judge's reading of the trial's jury instructions on May 27, 2022, Depp's and Heard's legal teams presented their closing arguments.

Depp's legal team maintained that Heard was the abuser in their relationship and that Heard's allegations against Depp were untrue and had ruined his life. They asked the jurors to "give him his life back". "You either believe all of it or none of it. Either Mr. Depp assaulted Ms. Heard with a bottle in Australia, or Ms. Heard got up on that stand, in front of all of you, and made up that horrific tale of abuse," lawyer Camille Vasquez told the jury. "An act of profound cruelty not just to Mr. Depp but to true survivors of domestic abuse." Vasquez told the court that Heard "came into this courtroom ready to give the performance of her lifetime [...] and she gave it." Vasquez also argued that Heard "burns bridges" and "her close friends don't show up for her," because, according to Vasquez, apart from Heard's sister, every person who personally testified on behalf of Heard was a "paid expert", whereas many witnesses personally testified for Depp in court.

Heard's legal team maintained that Depp did abuse Heard, and that even if he did not abuse her, the op-ed was not libelous as it did not mention Depp by name nor directly address her allegations against him. They told jurors to "think about the message that Mr. Depp and his attorneys are sending to Amber and victims of domestic abuse." "If you didn't take pictures, it didn't happen," Benjamin Rottenborn, a lawyer for Heard, said. "If you didn't seek medical attention, you weren't injured." He claimed Depp "cannot and will not take responsibility. [...] It's all somebody else's fault." He told jurors that "if Amber was abused by Mr. Depp even one time, then she wins." Rottenborn accused Depp of "victim blaming at its most disgusting".

==== Verdict ====
On June 1, 2022, after nearly two days of deliberations, the jury found that Depp had proven all the elements of defamation for all three statements from Heard's 2018 op-ed, including that the statements were false, and that Heard defamed Depp with actual malice. The jury awarded Depp $10 million in compensatory damages and $5 million in punitive damages from Heard. The punitive damages, however, were reduced to $350,000 due to a limit imposed by Virginia state law.

In regard to Heard's counterclaim, the jury found the second of the three contested statements that Depp's former lawyer Adam Waldman had published in the Daily Mail to be defamatory and false, defaming Heard with actual malice. Regarding the other two contested statements, the jurors concluded that Heard's attorneys had not proven all the elements of defamation. Heard was awarded $2 million in compensatory damages from Depp but no punitive damages.

=== Post-trial motions ===
On July 1, 2022, Heard's legal team asked the court to set aside the verdict in favor of Depp in its entirety, dismiss the complaint or order a new trial. Their arguments included that (1) Heard "never edited or played any role with respect to the headline" and "never even became aware of the headline until Mr. Depp filed the lawsuit against her"; (2) that "Depp's award was excessive" and that, though Depp had "represented to the court he would limit his damages to the period Dec. 18, 2018 through Nov. 2, 2020," he "continued to urge the jury to restore his reputation and legacy to his children as a result of Ms. Heard accusing Mr. Depp in May 2016 of domestic violence"; (3) one juror was listed as born in 1945 in a court list, but public information "demonstrates that he appears to have been born in 1970".

On July 13, 2022, Azcarate denied several of Heard's post-trial motions for "reasons stated on the record" but provided further explanation regarding the disputed juror. She stated that the summons issued to the juror "listed his legal name and address and no birth date was noted", that the juror had provided his proper birth date when answering a court questionnaire and that Heard's legal team had neither alleged nor "shown evidence of prejudice" by the juror. She also noted that the parties had "questioned the jury panel for a full day and informed the court that the jury panel was acceptable"; and that "a party cannot wait until receiving an adverse verdict to object, for the first time, to an issue known since the beginning of trial." She concluded that "[t]he only evidence before this court is that this juror and all jurors followed their oaths, the court's instructions and orders. This court is bound by the competent decision of the jury."

=== Appeals and settlement ===
Heard appealed the judgment against her in October 2022 while Depp appealed his in November 2022.

Heard and Depp settled the case in December 2022 and dropped their appeals, with Heard stating that even if her appeal had succeeded, she "simply cannot go through" a retrial having "lost faith in the American legal system". She maintained that the settlement was "not an act of concession" and that she had not agreed to any "restrictions or gags" going forward. Depp's lawyers stated that the "jury's unanimous decision and the resulting judgement in Mr. Depp's favor against Ms. Heard remain fully in place", and that the settlement would result in $1 million being paid to Depp by Heard's insurance, which "Depp is pledging and will donate to charities".

=== Insurance lawsuits ===
New York Marine & General Insurance Co. v. Heard
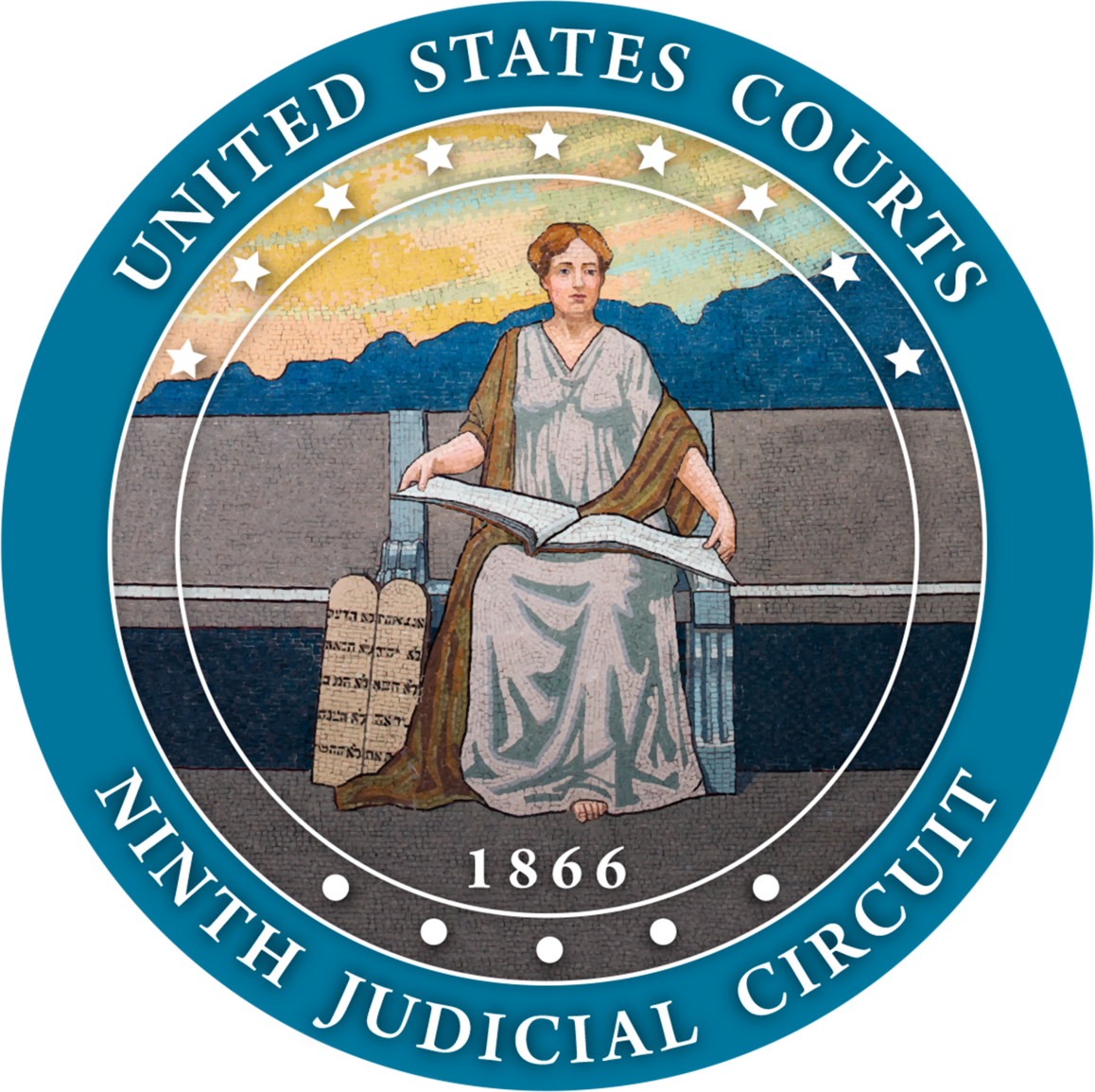
- Court: United States Court of Appeals for the Ninth Circuit
- Full case name: New York Marine and General Insurance Company v. Amber Heard
- Started: November 17, 2023
- Decided: November 25, 2024; 23 months ago
- Verdict: Affirmed. New York Marine fulfilled its duty to defend.
- Citation: No. 23-3399 (9th Cir. 2024)
- Claim: Declaratory relief of duty to defend and indemnify

Case history
- Prior actions: New York Marine and General Insurance Company v. Amber Heard (C.D. Cal. Oct. 12, 2023)

Court membership
- Judges sitting: Andrew D. Hurwitz; Roopali H. Desai; Barrington D. Parker (by designation from the Second Circuit

Case opinions
- Decision by: Per curiam (memorandum decision)

Prior to the publication of the op-ed in 2018, Heard took out homeowner's insurance carrier policies with two companies that covered costs associated with defamation lawsuits: New York Marine and General Insurance Co. (New York Marine), under a policy providing coverage for up to $1 million, and Travelers Commercial Insurance Company, which covered approximately $500,000 under a homeowners policy. When Depp filed his lawsuit in March 2019, Heard retained the law firm Cameron McEvoy to represent her; six months after the Depp suit commenced, Heard notified her carriers. Travelers briefly disputed with New York Marine, at one point filing a lawsuit claiming that New York Marine had failed to participate in the defense with counsel of Heard's choosing. New York Marine eventually agreed to reimburse a portion of Heard's defense costs, paying over $600,000.

Following the June 2022 verdict in favor of Depp, New York Marine filed a lawsuit against Heard in the District Court for the Central District of California on July 8, 2022, seeking declaratory relief that it had no duty to defend or indemnify Heard. The company claimed that, because the jury ruled the defamatory statements were made with "actual malice", they were exempt from providing indemnity to Heard under California Insurance Code. The company also refused to cover any portion of Heard's legal fees for the trial, which she testified had exceeded $6 million. Heard filed a counterclaim on November 21, 2022 alleging breach of contract and breach of the implied covenant of good faith and fair dealing, arguing she was entitled to independent counsel that New York Marine failed to provide.

Depp and Heard subsequently settled the underlying case out of court in December 2022. On October 12, 2023, District Judge George H. Wu issued an order in favor of New York Marine, finding that the plaintiff had fulfilled its duty to defend Heard by continuing to fund her chosen counsel, Cameron McEvoy, and was not obligated to provide independent counsel at its expense. The court also dismissed Heard's counterclaim, finding that the case had become moot following the out-of-court settlement.

Both parties subsequently appealed to the Ninth Circuit; the two appeals were consolidated for review: Heard appealed the dismissal of her counterclaims, while New York Marine cross-appealed certain aspects of the district court's ruling. On November 25, 2024, a three-judge panel issued an unpublished memorandum decision affirming the district court on all issues. The court opinion additionally reaffirmed the insurer's policy language permitting it to select defense counsel and that it fulfilled this obligation by continuing the appointment of Cameron McEvoy.

The final mandate was formally issued on December 18, 2024.

== Reactions ==
The trial drew much attention from supporters of either Depp or Heard as well as the broader public. At the start of the trial, several legal experts suggested that Depp had a smaller chance of winning than he did in the previous UK trial, citing the strong free speech protections in the US.

=== Livestream ===
The trial was live-streamed, with very high viewing figures and video clips being widely shared on social media. The president of the Law & Crime network, Rachel Stockman, observed that the average daily viewership on their app was fifty times higher than before the trial.

The decision by Judge Azcarate to allow livestreaming, a rarity in Virginia courts, has been criticized. Some observers expressed concern that it would discourage victims of domestic violence from speaking out; Michele Dauber, a professor at Stanford Law School, stated, "Allowing this trial to be televised is the single worst decision I can think of in the context of intimate partner violence and sexual violence in recent history, it has ramifications way beyond this case."

Amanda Hess, a critic writing for The New York Times, opined that the broadcasting of the trial "is an invitation for the proceedings to be deliberately, even gleefully tailored to a viewer's whim", with internet platforms like TikTok and YouTube being "practically built to manipulate raw visual materials in the service of a personality cult, harassment campaign or branding opportunity." On the other hand, Kellie Lynch, an associate professor of criminology and criminal justice at The University of Texas at San Antonio, praised the trial for "afford[ing] an opportunity to openly discuss the nuances of IPV that are often overlooked".

=== Social media coverage ===
Data collected by Newswhip from April 4 to May 16, 2022, indicated that news articles about the trial had generated more social-media interactions per article in the United States than all other significant news topics, including the leaked Supreme Court draft opinion on abortion, Elon Musk's acquisition of Twitter, the inflation surge, and the Russian invasion of Ukraine. Twitter, TikTok, and Instagram users expressed opinions about the case or rallied against others doing the same. Clips of the trial were used to create memes, compilation or reaction videos, with multiple such videos going viral. Those posting about the trial on social media were seen to mostly support Depp and oppose Heard. Videos carrying the hashtag #justiceforjohnnydepp had attained over 18 billion views on TikTok by the trial's conclusion. BuzzFeed News reported that, between April 25 and 29, 2022, there were 1,667 posts uploaded to Facebook using the hashtag #JusticeForJohnnyDepp, with over 7 million total interactions, i.e., likes and shares between them. In comparison, Heard only had 16 posts in support, with 10,415 interactions. Additionally, on TikTok, videos tagged with #JusticeForJohnnyDepp had over 5 billion combined views, while videos tagged with #JusticeForAmberHeard had only 21 million combined views as of April 29.

Bill Goodykoontz of The Arizona Republic criticized the social media coverage of the trial, stating that "Depp and Heard are real people with real problems, after all, not just meme fodder and hashtag subjects," and that "the vile nature of some of the misogynistic tweets and TikTok videos posted about Heard were toxic masculinity at its worst." Katherine Denkinson of The Independent likened the social media backlash against Heard and her supporters during the trial to Gamergate, claiming that "the anti-Amber train has been expertly commandeered by the alt-right." Journalist Amelia Tait of The Guardian wrote that Depp v. Heard had turned into "trial by TikTok", stating that the case had become "a source of comedy" on social media. Similar themes were noted by journalists at BuzzFeed News, The Independent, and Vanity Fair. Sunny Hundal of The Independent, remarking upon social media reactions about Depp and Heard, opined that "There clearly isn't a gender divide here either. A lot of women have taken Johnny Depp's side, and a lot of vocal men are on Heard's side. [...] But it can also be true that social media coverage of this case has subtly played into traditional, sexist tropes about men and women." Columnist Katie Edwards, writing for The Independent and the i Newspaper, argued that the trial "exposed the fallacy of mutual abuse" and claimed that "war criminals guilty of atrocities don't get as much vitriol" as Heard. A.O. Scott argued that Depp's gender allowed the courtroom audience to "accept him as flawed, vulnerable, human, and to view her as monstrous," contending that "[c]elebrity and masculinity confer mutually reinforcing advantages."

Misinformation was widely shared, with researchers identifying bots artificially spreading content. For example, social media users falsely alleged that Heard copied quotes from the film The Talented Mr. Ripley (1999) in her testimony. Widely shared falsehoods that Heard was using cocaine on the stand were also disproven. Shannon Keating, a culture writer and editor for BuzzFeed News, wrote that the "social media frenzy around this case was clearly fueled by savvy PR", bots, and conservative media advertising, with the result that "lots of people have happily accepted the propaganda as sacrosanct." In May 2022, the media non-profit The Citizens and Vice World News reported that the conservative website The Daily Wire had spent between $35,000 and $47,000 on Facebook and Instagram advertisements and have promoted "misleading information about the trial" and "anti-Amber Heard propaganda".

In July 2022, Twitter analytics service Bot Sentinel published a report saying that Twitter trolls had engaged in "rampant abuse and widespread targeted harassment" of women who voiced support for Heard. In November 2022, more than 130 people and groups associated with women's rights and domestic-violence prevention—including Gloria Steinem, the National Organization for Women, the National Women's Law Center, and Equality Now—signed an open letter supporting Heard. The letter noted that the vilification and "online harassment" of Heard and her supporters were "unprecedented in both vitriol and scale," and attributed it to "disinformation, misogyny, biphobia, and a monetized social media environment where a woman's allegations of domestic violence and sexual assault were mocked for entertainment." Psychology professor Jennifer Freyd, who coined the term DARVO (deny, attack, and reverse victim and offender), stated, "What we have witnessed in the US over this case has been an overwhelming case for Depp on social media. It is like an anti-Heard campaign and there has been a lot of Darvo."

The intense coverage of the trial and the fact that it was live-streamed made it an unusual case. Legal commentators and Heard's attorneys suggested that, because the jury was not sequestered, the social-media coverage of the trial may have had an influence on the final verdict. During the trial, the judge asked the jurors to refrain from reading about the case online, even instructing them to turn off their cell phones for its duration. Paula Todd, a lawyer and media professor, raised the question of how many of the jury members would listen to the judge's instructions to avoid accessing online coverage. Law professor Mary Anne Franks said, "[I]t's crazy to think they are not going to be influenced by what's happening on social media," further noting that she encountered out-of-context, distorted depictions of the trial despite trying to avoid reading about the case. Carl Tobias, a University of Richmond School of Law professor, said "I don't envy the judge—or the jurors—because it's hard to protect them from [outside] influences," noting that such outside influences inhibit the justice system's ability to "give people a fair day in court." Following the trial, a juror denied that the jury had been influenced by social media, saying, "We followed the evidence. We didn't take into account anything outside [...] They were very serious accusations and a lot of money involved. So we weren't taking it lightly."

=== Comments by juror ===
Following the trial, a juror was interviewed by Good Morning America. The juror stated that he found that Depp and Heard "were both abusive to each other" but that Heard's team failed to prove that Depp's abuse was physical. "They had their husband-wife arguments. They were both yelling at each other, I don't think that makes either of them right or wrong [...] But to rise to the level of what she was claiming, there wasn't enough or any evidence that really supported what she was saying". The juror opined that Heard's testimony was not "believable" because it "seemed like she was able to flip the switch on her emotions", while Depp "seemed a little more real in terms of how he responded to questions". Heard, the juror said, was considered the aggressor in the relationship by the majority of the jury, stating "If you have a battered wife or spouse situation, why would you buy the other person, the 'aggressor,' a knife?"

=== The Washington Post ===
On June 2, 2022, The Washington Post affixed an editor's note to Heard's 2018 op-ed to notify readers of the defamation suit and its outcome, reading, "On June 1, 2022, [...] a jury found Heard liable on three counts. [...] The jury separately found that Depp, through his lawyer Adam Waldman, defamed Heard in one of three counts in her countersuit."

=== Commentary on verdict ===
Various columnists and legal experts reacted strongly to the verdict. Defamation suits by public figures are rarely successful in the United States, relevant case law being New York Times Co. v. Sullivan and the subsequent Curtis Publishing Co. v. Butts. New York Times reporter Jeremy W. Peters said that, in publishing allegations of abuse, "both ... women and the press assume the considerable risk that comes with antagonizing the rich, powerful and litigious". Dan Novack of The Atlantic argued that the verdict concluded a "fair trial" and was not a markedly different interpretation of the First Amendment, which he says remains "enormously protective of media reporting on credible accusations of sexual abuse. It is telling that Depp did not name the ACLU, which helped draft the op-ed at the center of the case, or The Washington Post (which published it)."

University of Richmond School of Law Professor Carl Tobias said he was surprised by the verdict, and said it was "unusual" that both Depp and Heard won at least one count each. Lisa Bloom, an attorney in several high-profile sexual abuse cases, described the verdicts as "inconsistent", asking, "How can it be that Amber Heard was defamed when Johnny Depp's lawyer said that her allegations were a hoax, and yet Johnny Depp was also defamed when she said she was representative of domestic violence?" Entertainment Weekly asked Neama Rahmani, a former federal prosecutor, and Valentina Shaknes, a founding partner of matrimonial law firm Krauss Shaknes Tallentire & Messeri, to explain "why was it defamatory for Depp's lawyers to accuse [Heard] of a hoax" when "the jury didn't find her abuse claims credible": Rahmani suggested that the jury decided that Waldman "lied when he said that Heard and her friends set Depp up and perpetuated a hoax when they called the LAPD to the apartment", likely because "the evidence revealed that Heard didn't call LAPD" and Heard "didn't even cooperate with LAPD when they showed up". Shaknes, who had previously expressed surprise at the verdicts (saying, "It sort of took me a minute to figure out how they both could be awarded damages; how they both could be right"), said, "The best way to translate it is that I think the jury wanted to give Amber something."

Several commentators and feminist organizations expressed concern that the suit set a precedent that would dissuade survivors of abuse from speaking out in light of the threat of defamation litigation. An open letter signed by more than 130 women's-rights and domestic-violence-centered organizations and activists denounced the "rising misuse" of defamation lawsuits to silence people who report domestic and sexual abuse and stated that the verdict and the online response "indicate a fundamental misunderstanding of intimate partner and sexual violence and how survivors respond to it." Similarly, Kathy Spillar, the executive director of the Feminist Majority Foundation, said her organization observed a "growing backlash" against women who speak out against abusers, adding, "If this can happen to Amber Heard, it will discourage other women from speaking up and even filing reports about domestic violence and sexual assault." Conversely, Fox Nation's Tomi Lahren argued that, rather than chill speech, Depp's victory represented a "big victory in the battle against cancel culture".

Founder of Refuge Erin Pizzey expressed her support to Johnny Depp, describing him as a survivor of domestic violence: "Johnny Depp is a hero. He is a precedent setter who has done the world a great favour. From now on, every judge and jury considering allegations of abuse will know of this case. They will know that an accused man has proven his innocence, and that men are abused too. Most importantly, they will know that a violent woman was the abuser, and that women can be violent—this realisation is the trial's legacy."

Some commentators were skeptical of the trial's long-term effect, arguing that the trial's context was too unique to be indicative of #MeToo's reversal. Mitra Ahouraian, a media attorney, said "I'm hoping that people recognize this as distinct from a lot of the #MeToo situations that we've seen, for example, like the Harvey Weinsteins of the world. This is not that. This is two people who were in a toxic relationship that were awful to one another and a jury decided that one of them was manipulating the situation." Leading sexual assault lawyer Debra Katz described the trial as having unique celebrity, "dysfunction", and "craziness" but judged that the Depp v. Heard verdict was less "consequential" to #MeToo compared to Harvey Weinstein losing his appeal for his rape conviction the next day. Tarana Burke, generally considered the founder of #MeToo, tweeted that "The 'me too' movement isn't dead, this system is dead. [...] When you get the verdict you want, 'the movement works' – when you don't, it's dead. [...] This movement is very much alive."

Alexandra Lysova, Associate Professor of Criminology at Simon Fraser University, argued that the verdict was, in fact, an expansion of #MeToo to male victims of intimate partner violence. Conversely, A. O. Scott pointed out that, though Depp "accused Heard of doing terrible things to him in the course of their relationship and breakup, the lawsuit wasn't about those things. It was about words published under her name, none of which were 'Johnny Depp.'" And, writing for Vox, Constance Grady said, "Depp's victory is not an expansion of the gains of Me Too. It is a cynical appropriation of the rhetoric of Me Too, applied now to its end."

Jack Houghton, digital editor of Sky News Australia, deemed Vasquez's cross-examination to have shown the public Heard's lack of credibility while further considered the ruling of Waldman having defamed Heard to be "hardly a verdict that a cabal of sexist jurors would render". Halim Dhanidina, a criminal defense attorney and retired judge, and Limor Mojdehiazad, a family law attorney, agreed that the manner of Heard's testimony may have influenced the jury's verdict against her, and also agreed that Depp's legal team was stronger than Heard's. Dhanidina opined that Depp's legal team brought forth more convincing witnesses and evidence, while Heard's testimony had inconsistencies, some of which were caused by her lawyers, who wrongly suggested that Heard used a specific makeup kit which had not yet been developed at the time of the alleged events.

== Media coverage ==
=== Film adaptation ===
A film adaptation of the trial, Hot Take: The Depp/Heard Trial, premiered on September 30, 2022, on Tubi.

=== Books ===
Journalist Nick Wallis's book, Depp v Heard: The Unreal Story, about the trials in both the UK and the US and his experiences reporting from court was published in May 2023.

Hollywood Vampires: Johnny Depp, Amber Heard, and the Celebrity Exploitation Machine was published in June 2025, providing analysis of the trial and insights from a former juror.

=== TV ===
BBC News aired Reputation: Depp v Heard in June 2022. In the same month, Channel 5 broadcast Depp vs Heard: Winners and Losers.

Discovery+ released the documentary Johnny vs Amber: The US Trial in September 2022, which was added to Max on May 23, 2023.

Another documentary was released by the French national television broadcaster France Télévisions in February 2023. The documentary, titled "Affaire Johnny Depp/Amber Heard", was released as the fifth episode of the third season of the La Fabrique du Mensonge docuseries broadcast by the network.

Channel 4 aired the three-part docuseries Depp v. Heard in May 2023 based on transcripts of the American defamation trial. Netflix released the docuseries outside the UK on August 16, 2023.

A three part series titled Surviving Amber Heard was released on Amazon Prime in 2023.

=== Podcast ===
A podcast series titled Who Trolled Amber? was released in 2024, which alleged links between Depp and Mohammed bin Salman (the Crown Prince of Saudi Arabia), as well as alleging that Saudi-funded bot networks were used to foster widespread support for Depp.

== See also ==
- Domestic violence
- Domestic violence against men
- Court of public opinion
- Duluth Model
- Richard Marks (lawyer)
- Ali Zafar vs. Meesha Shafi
