= Tracey Jacobs =

American talent agent

- Born: Illinois
- Education: Boston University
- Occupation: Talent agent
- Employer: United Talent Agency

Tracey Jacobs is an American talent agent. She is a partner at United Talent Agency and a member of the company's board of directors.

== Early life and education ==
Jacobs was raised in Glencoe, Illinois, one of six children born to Gitta (née Kaperl) and Anthony Jacobs. She attended Boston University, graduating from the College of Arts and Sciences in 1979.

== Career ==
Following her college graduation, Jacobs moved to Chicago, where she worked as an advertising copywriter for Leo Burnett Worldwide. While visiting a friend in Los Angeles, she came across a help wanted ad for a children's agent, and although she had no prior experience, she landed the $12,00-a-year job. Among others, she represented Jason and Justine Bateman. She booked Justine Bateman on the hit television series, Family Ties; it was Bateman's first role as a professional actor.

In 1987 she was hired by Sam Cohn as an agent at ICM. She later said Cohn was her mentor. She signed Johnny Depp in 1988 after seeing him in an episode of 21 Jump Street. Described as "responsible for turning him into a global superstar," Jacobs secured defining roles for Depp early in his career; among other films, he starred in What's Eating Gilbert Grape, Edward Scissorhands and Sweeney Todd.

Jacobs joined UTA in 1998 and became a member of the company's board of directors in 2008. The first female board member in UTA's history, her roster included Harrison Ford, Gwyneth Paltrow, Tim Robbins, Jennifer Lopez, and Megan Mullally.

In addition to his business managers and his publicist, Depp fired Jacobs in 2016. He reportedly earned more than $650 million while Jacobs represented him. In a 2025 interview with London's Sunday Times, Depp criticised her: "I was with one agent for 30 years, but she spoke in court about how difficult I was. That’s death by confetti, these fake motherf***ers who lie to you, celebrate you, say all sorts of horror behind your back, yet keep the money — that confetti machine going — because what do they want? Dough."

In November 2023, Deadline reported that Jacobs would leave UTA in 2024.
