= Rapid Relief Team =

Disaster relief charity

Rapid Relief Team (RRT)
- Founded: 2013
- Type: Humanitarian relief organisation
- Origins: Founded by members of the Plymouth Brethren Christian Church
- Region served: Worldwide (Australia, New Zealand, UK, Europe, USA, Canada, Caribbean, South America, Africa)
- Products: Emergency food boxes, water, care kits
- Services: Emergency response, community support, crisis relief
- Method: Volunteer-led rapid response teams delivering practical support and donated aid
- Website: https://www.rrtglobal.org/

Rapid Relief Team, also known as RRT, is a multinational nonprofit established in 2013 by the Plymouth Brethren Christian Church. The organization provides emergency food and welfare support to disaster-affected communities, first responders, and vulnerable groups across multiple countries.

== History ==
RRT was founded with the mission of delivering catering assistance and tangible support during crises. Since then, it has expanded operations to over 14 countries, including Australia, the United States, Canada, New Zealand, Argentina, and parts of Europe.

The establishment of RRT occurred during a period of regulatory scrutiny directed at the Plymouth Brethren Christian Church, which founded and operates the charity. In 2012, the Charity Commission for England and Wales refused charitable status to the PBCC’s Preston Down Trust, citing concerns over lack of public benefit. The PBCC appealed the decision. Charitable status was granted and the Commission concluded the Preston Downs Trust could demonstrate public benefit by, among other steps, "engaging to a certain extent in the wider community, including through disaster relief".

== Causes and operations ==
=== Food Box Aid - Gaza ===
In 2025, the RRT partnered with the Global Empowerment Movement (GEM) to package and distribute food boxes to families and children in Gaza. The initiative delivered more than 118,000 meals, later surpassing one million meals during a ceasefire period.

=== Food Box Aid - Ukraine ===
In 2022, RRT partnered with SaveUA to provide food and personal care supplies to people displaced by the war in Ukraine. The assistance formed part of RRT's broader international disaster and conflict response activities.

=== Farmers Community Connect (FCC) - Australia and New Zealand ===
Since 2018, RRT has held FCC events across Australia and New Zealand to support farmers affected by droughts, floods and bushfires. FCC events provide farmers with donated hay or livestock feed, fencing materials, meals and opportunities for community connection.

In 2025, RRT conducted multiple FCC events across South Australia in response to drought conditions, including in Jamestown, Paruna and the Eyre Peninsula. Donated hay and livestock feed were distributed to registered farmers. The initiative was supported by the South Australian Government and Primary Industries and Regions South Australia (PIRSA), with additional collaboration from charities including Save Our Sheep and Lions Clubs.

In August 2025, RRT held an FCC event in Tapawera, New Zealand, distributing fencing repair packs to farmers affected by flooding in the Tasman region. In December 2025, a similar FCC event was held in the Tararua District, where fencing repair packs were provided to farmers impacted by storm damage.

In 2026, RRT held an FCC event in Ruffy, Victoria, following severe summer bushfires. Farmers received donated fencing wire to assist with property repairs. The event followed a week of RRT support during the Longwood fire emergency, where volunteers served meals to the Country Fire Authority (CFA) and local residents.

== Criticism ==
RRT has faced criticism due to its close association with the Plymouth Brethren Christian Church (PBCC). Critics and former members allege that RRT functions as a "brand-washing" initiative, helping to deflect criticism of the social harms caused by these practices.

In 2018 it was reported that, despite RRT's public claim that "100 per cent" of donations to its Australian drought appeal would reach farmers, nearly half of the funds raised in 2016-2017 were used for internal expenses.

In 2024, South Australia's Department of Health (SA Health) formally ceased collaboration with RRT, citing concerns over its affiliation with the PBCC.

=== Copyright dispute involving abuse allegations ===
In February 2026, The Age reported that Rapid Relief Team (RRT), a charity affiliated with the Plymouth Brethren Christian Church, commenced legal action in the United States against former church member Cheryl Bawtinheimer, alleging copyright infringement related to the use of RRT branding in YouTube videos. Bawtinheimer, who left the church as a teenager, has publicly alleged that she was sexually abused during childhood by a church elder and has stated that she reported the allegations to police in Canada.

Bawtinheimer is a co-producer of the YouTube podcast Get a Life Podcast, which features critical commentary on the Plymouth Brethren Christian Church and its associated organisations, including RRT. Some of the videos displayed RRT’s kookaburra logo, known as “Cookie”, which the charity claimed infringed its copyright. The logo appeared in the context of critical commentary and was not used for commercial purposes.

According to court filings cited by The Age, RRT sought the removal of videos referencing the organisation, monetary relief, and a jury trial in California, where YouTube is headquartered. The complaint also sought injunctive relief including the “destruction” and “recall” of videos containing the logo. The report stated that YouTube removed multiple videos following copyright complaints, raising concerns from critics about the use of copyright enforcement to suppress criticism.

Legal scholar Cathay Y. N. Smith described the case as “copyright silencing,” defining it as “the practice of using copyrights to silence criticism, censor speech, and prevent the dissemination of facts.” She wrote that the lawsuit “looks, swims, and quacks like copyright silencing.” Smith also stated that the Plymouth Brethren Christian Church has “a successful history of silencing its critics through copyright claims,” including actions brought directly or “through affiliated entities.”

Bawtinheimer stated that a man she identified as her alleged abuser had been photographed wearing an RRT uniform in 2023, and described the lawsuit as an attempt to silence her advocacy regarding abuse within the church. RRT declined to comment in detail on the allegations, stating that the legal action related solely to the protection of its copyrighted material and that it encouraged abuse allegations to be referred to authorities.
