= Richard Marks (lawyer) =

American lawyer

- Education: University of California, Los Angeles (BA, JD)
- Occupation: Entertainment lawyer

Richard Marks is an American entertainment lawyer.

== Early life and education ==
Marks graduated from the University of California, Los Angeles (UCLA) with a Bachelor of Arts in 1970, where he was the valedictory speaker. He continued his education at the UCLA School of Law, receiving his Juris Doctor (J.D.) in 1973 and passing the California bar that same year.

== Career ==
Marks began his legal career in-house at major entertainment studios, including Universal Network Television, Disney, and Paramount, and his big clients included ITV, Village Roadshow and MRC. He transitioned to private practice, eventually forming his own firm, Richard Marks & Associates Entertainment Law, in April 2020.

Marks has also served as an expert witness in various high-profile legal cases, including Depp v. Heard.

== Filmography ==
- The Bridge (production legal services: Greenberg)
- Bosch
- Aladdin
- The SpongeBob SquarePants Movie
- All the Money in the World
- Ozark
