= Depp v. Heard (TV series) =

- Directed by: Emma Cooper
- Country of origin: United Kingdom
- Original language: English
- No. of seasons: 1
- No. of episodes: 3

Original release
- Network: Channel 4
- Release: May 21 – May 23, 2023

Depp v. Heard is a 2023 British three-part documentary series directed by Emma Cooper. It is focused on the 2022 defamation trial between American actors Johnny Depp and Amber Heard. It aired on Channel 4 in the United Kingdom on May 21, 2023, and was released internationally by Netflix that August.

== Production ==
Director Emma Cooper chose not to conduct interviews, including with Depp and Heard, for the series. She stated, "My intention, right from the start, was to make a cogent and interesting reflection of what happened without using interviews or experts."

== Release ==
Depp v. Heard aired on May 21, 2023, on Channel 4 in the United Kingdom. It was released on Netflix in August 2023.

== Reception ==
On the review aggregator website Rotten Tomatoes, 27% of 11 critics' reviews are positive, with an average rating of 5.3/10. The website's consensus reads: "Retreading a sordid saga without fresh insight, Depp v Heard offers little to recommend for anyone already familiar with one of the most publicized trials of the century."

CNN's Brian Lowry said the documentary "suffers from its commitment to serve two masters, trying to get at the elusive truth of what transpired between this famous couple while providing a jaundiced view of the way social media has poisoned a collective grasp of truth." Daniel Fienberg of The Hollywood Reporter wrote, "For viewers coming out of a 10-year coma, Depp v. Heard is sure to be vaguely enlightening and disheartening, but otherwise, it's hard to know who the ideal audience would be. I'm sure some of the most vocal and flamboyant of online Johnny Depp supporters will be happy to see themselves represented with so little pushback, so maybe it will be a fun time capsule for them?"

Pallavi Keswani of The Hindu wrote, "Cooper's attempt with Depp vs. Heard remarkably manages to dodge anything that would have made it meaningful... It glaringly lacks the view of an expert, be that an expert on legal proceedings, domestic violence, victims of abuse, or on dissemination and consumption of information." Rohan Naahar, writing for The Indian Express, called the documentary "the cinematic equivalent of armchair journalism" and "typically well-produced, but frustratingly shallow".
