= Cheryl Bawtinheimer =

Canadian activist and whistleblower

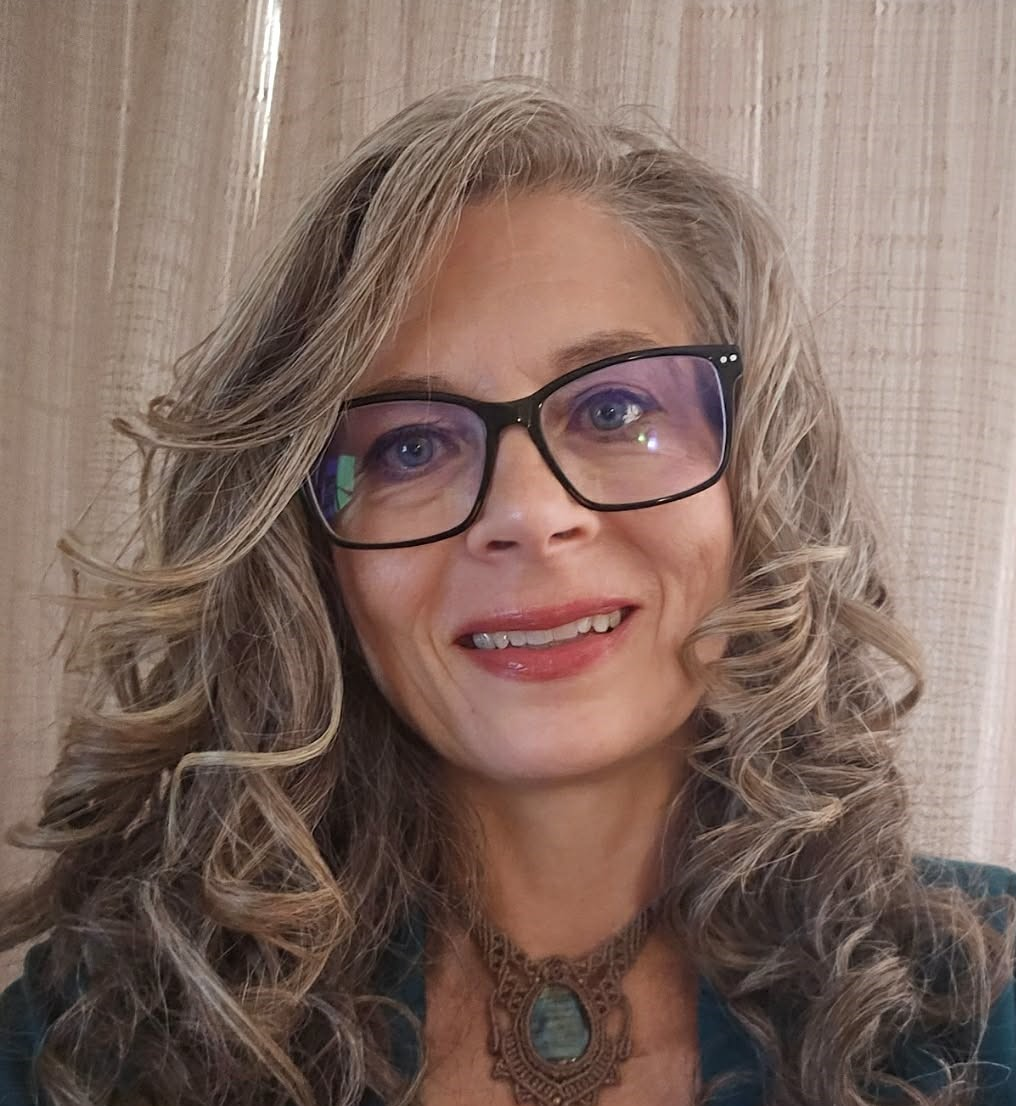
- Bawtinheimer in 2026
- Born: Cheryl Hope; Maple Creek, Saskatchewan, Canada
- Occupations: Activist, media producer
- Known for: Plymouth Brethren Christian Church whistleblower.

Cheryl Bawtinheimer (born Cheryl Hope) is a Canadian activist and media producer known for her advocacy regarding the Plymouth Brethren Christian Church (PBCC), a religious organization formerly known as the Exclusive Brethren. She is a prominent critic of the group's practices and a co-founder of the Get a Life podcast, which documents the experiences of former PBCC members.

== Early life ==
Bawtinheimer was born and raised within the Plymouth Brethren Christian Church in Maple Creek, Saskatchewan. In 1992, at the age of 17, she left the organization. She has stated that her exit was motivated by the church's restrictive doctrines and her personal experiences of trauma.

== Whistleblowing and advocacy ==
In 2022, Bawtinheimer began publicly sharing her experiences following the release of the documentary Breaking Brethren. She filed a police report with the Royal Canadian Mounted Police (RCMP), alleging historic sexual abuse involving a church elder during her childhood.

In October 2022, Bawtinheimer launched Get a Life Podcast: Ex-Cult Conversations, a podcast which documents the experiences of former PBCC members. The podcast, which had published 180 episodes as of September 2026, has been cited as a primary resource for church "insiders" seeking to leave the organization.

In July 2025, Bawtinheimer was a featured speaker at the International Cultic Studies Association (ICSA) conference in Montreal. Her presentation examined the role of digital media and podcasts in breaking the information isolation of current church members.

== Legal disputes ==
=== Rapid Relief Team (RRT) v. Bawtenheimer ===
In December 2025, the Rapid Relief Team (RRT), a charity founded by the PBCC, filed a federal copyright infringement lawsuit against Bawtinheimer in the U.S. District Court for the Northern District of California. The lawsuit alleges that Bawtinheimer intentionally infringed on the RRT's copyrighted stylized bird logo in her YouTube channel Get a Life Podcast.

The litigation followed Bawtinheimer's public identification of a man she alleged was her abuser, noting he had been photographed in an RRT uniform. Bawtinheimer and legal observers have characterized the lawsuit as a SLAPP (Strategic Lawsuit Against Public Participation) intended to silence her whistleblowing. The RRT has stated the action is a standard intellectual property matter to protect its brand.

PBCC-affiliated entities have a documented history of legal action against critics, including defamation suits and legal threats against journalists, copyright claims against former members, and the use of "Anton Piller" search orders. The church has said such actions by member-owned businesses had "nothing to do with the church". Researchers Laura Dyason and Bernard Doherty describe the church's use of litigation against former members' websites "in attempts to mute criticism or to preserve the integrity of certain internal documents".

== Media features ==
Bawtinheimer’s story has been the subject of several investigative reports, including the episode "Big Brethren" on ABC's Four Corners, which investigated the financial and political influence of PBCC leader Bruce Hales; Canadaland's reporting on the RCMP investigation into alleged historical sexual abuse within the PBCC; as well as media coverage in The Age, The Sydney Morning Herald and CTV News.

== Personal life ==
Bawtinheimer is married and has three children. In 2019, her family was featured in local news coverage after her husband Curtis required a mechanical heart implant due to severe heart failure. The community organized fundraising efforts to support the family during his ongoing medical treatment.

== See also ==
- Plymouth Brethren Christian Church
- Rapid Relief Team
- Coercive control
- Shunning
