= Mark Andrew Richards =

Mark Andrew Richards (January 20, 1952) is a retired American engineer best known for his textbooks and professional education courses in the area of radar and radar signal processing. He remains employed part time as a Principal Research Engineer and adjunct professor in the School of Electrical and Computer Engineering (ECE) at the Georgia Institute of Technology and as a private consultant and expert witness.

Born in Fort Worth, Texas, Richards grew up primarily in Houston, Texas. He moved to Atlanta, Georgia to attend Georgia Tech, earning a Bachelor of Electrical Engineering in 1974. He obtained a Master of Science in Electrical Engineering from Stanford University in 1976. In 1982 he earned a Doctor of Philosophy from Georgia Tech. His thesis topic was "Helium Speech Enhancement Using the Short-Time Fourier Transform".

Richards subsequently joined the research faculty at the Georgia Tech Research Institute, ultimately serving as Chief of the Radar Systems Division, Sensors and Electromagnetic Applications Laboratory, During this time, he served two years in 1993–1995 at the Defense Advanced Research Projects Agency (DARPA) as Program Manager of the Rapid Prototyping of Application Specific Signal Processors (RASSP) program. Other employers included ESL, Inc. and Lockheed-Georgia. In 2002, Richards transferred to Georgia Tech's School of Electrical and Computer Engineering.

Richards is the author of the textbook Fundamentals of Radar Signal Processing (McGraw-Hill, second edition, 2014). He is also the lead editor and the author of five chapters in the textbook Principles of Modern Radar: Basic Principles (SciTech Publishing, 2010).

Richards was named a Fellow of the Institute of Electrical and Electronics Engineers (IEEE) in 2012, cited "for contributions in radar signal processing education".
