= A. Mark Richards =

New Zealand cardiologist

Mark Richards
- Born: Arthur Mark Richards; 1 May 1955 (age 71); Invercargill, New Zealand
- Occupations: Physician; academic; medical researcher
- Awards: Fellow of the Royal Society of New Zealand; Distinguished Research Medal, University of Otago; Sir Charles Hercus Medal for Biomedical Research, RSNZ; Singapore Translational Research (STaR) Award

Academic background
- Education: University of Otago

Academic work
- Institutions: University of Otago, Christchurch; National University of Singapore

Arthur Mark Richards (born 1 May 1955) is a New Zealand physician, academic and medical researcher. He is a professor of cardiology and director of the Cardiovascular Research Institute at the National University of Singapore, and a professor of medicine and founder of the Christchurch Heart Institute at the University of Otago, Christchurch, New Zealand, where he holds the National Heart Foundation (NZ) Chair of Cardiovascular Studies.

Richards has written over 850 peer-reviewed journal articles, and has over 25 patents in the field of cardiovascular biomarkers. His research revolves around integrated cardiovascular translational research incorporating clinical applied research, molecular biology, cardiovascular peptide biochemistry, genetics and preclinical physiology, with a particular focus upon discovery and application of biomarkers in cardiovascular disease.

Richards is a fellow of the Royal Australasian College Physicians (FRACP), Royal College of Physicians (FRCP) and Royal Society of New Zealand (FRSNZ), and the Council for High Blood Pressure Research, American Heart Association.

== Education ==
Richards completed his MB ChB at the University of Otago in 1978. He was admitted as FRACP in Internal Medicine by the Royal Australasian College of Physicians in 1984. He graduated Doctor of Medicine (MD) with distinction in 1986, PhD in medicine in 1993 and Doctor of Science (DSc), with a thesis titled The cardiac natriuretic peptides – from bench to bedside, in 2000 from the University of Otago. The Royal College of Physicians admitted him as FRCP in 2008. In 2019, he graduated with a Bachelor of Arts degree in history from Massey University, New Zealand.

== Career ==
Richards was appointed as a clinical lecturer at Christchurch School of Medicine, University of Otago, in 1988, where he became a professor in medicine in 1995. Since 2009, he has been professor of cardiology at the National University of Singapore, and a professor (joint faculty) in the Department of Biochemistry at National University Singapore as of 2010, and has also been an associate faculty member at the Genome Institute of Singapore since then.

Richards was awarded a personal chair in medicine by the University of Otago in 1995. He was deputy head of the Department of Medicine at the University of Otago, Christchurch, in 1998, and head of department from 2002 to 2003. From 1993 to 1997, he directed the FRACP Part 1 Registrar Training Programme (Christchurch) and was an examiner for FRACP clinical examinations. He was admitted to the fellowship of the Royal College of Physicians (FRCP) in 2008.

Richards was programme director of the New Zealand Health Research Council (HRC) programme grants for serial cardiovascular HRC research programmes continuously for 24 years from 1995 to 2019. In 1997, he was appointed to the National Heart Foundation chair of cardiovascular studies. He founded and assumed chairmanship of the Christchurch Cardioendocrine Research Group, University of Otago, Christchurch, which later became the Christchurch Heart Institute in 2012.

In 2009, Richards became the inaugural director of the Cardiovascular Research Institute at the National University of Singapore whilst continuing part-time retention of his New Zealand appointments. He has been deputy director of the National University Heart Centre Singapore (NUHCS) since 2021.

== Research ==
Richards’ primary research interests include multidisciplinary translational cardiovascular research programmes examining the pathogenesis of common, life-threatening disorders, including heart failure and coronary heart disease.

=== Biomarkers in cardiovascular disease ===
A key contribution has been the elucidation of the biology of the cardiac natriuretic peptides and the pioneering of their application as diagnostic, prognostic and monitoring tools in clinical heart failure. Work on the B type cardiac natriuretic peptides included the discovery and development of NT-proBNP. International guidelines on the diagnosis and management of heart failure globally now recommend measurement of plasma B type cardiac natriuretic peptides in aid of diagnosis and risk stratification in heart failure.

Richards leads ongoing research aimed at refining the clinical applications and beneficial actions of the natriuretic peptides. He has investigated the effect of atrial fibrillation on the diagnostic and prognostic performance of NT-proBNP in suspected heart failure. In the mid-1990s, Richards pioneered human clinical studies of neprilysin inhibition, important in metabolism of the NPs. His group has studied the integrated haemodynamic, endocrine and renal effects of human ANP analogues selected for exclusive vasodilatory or diuretic activities in experimental heart failure laying the path for possible precision peptide therapy in heart failure. His group has demonstrated the beneficial integrated hemodynamic, endocrine, and renal effects of phosphodiesterase-9 inhibition (PDE9-I; which specifically impedes breakdown of the 2nd messenger, cGMP generated by the natriuretic peptides) in experimental HF. Results support PDE9's role in HF pathophysiology and implies that its inhibition could possibly be a novel anti-heart failure therapy.

Richards has contributed to clinical research work establishing measurement of plasma cardiac troponin as an essential element in the diagnosis of acute myocardial infarction. He has also made numerous original contributions on the biology and biomarker potential of the urocortins and the adrenomedullins. Richards has also published influential data on the potential role of circulating microRNAs as biomarkers in heart failure.

=== General applied cardiology ===
In more general applied cardiology research, Richards recently compared the safety and efficacy of allied health care practitioner-led remote intensive management (RIM) with cardiologist-led standard care (SC) after myocardial infarction and found the former practice used with low-risk patients is feasible and should be further studied in higher-risk acute myocardial infarction cohorts. He has also used large-scale human plasma proteomics and single-cell resolution unbiased cardiac transcriptomics to prioritize candidate protein candidate markers of post-myocardial infarction adverse left ventricular remodeling heart failure. He has contributed to recruitment and investigation of clinical heart failure cohorts in both New Zealand and Singapore. Examples include research on optimal drug doses for heart failure medications. At a population level, he has contributed data towards large-scale whole-genome sequencing in Singapore with discovery of 52 million novel gene variants and improved understanding of the population structure and evolutionary history of Asians.

== Awards and honours ==
- 1995 – R. T. Hall Prize for Cardiovascular Research, The Cardiac Society of Australia and New Zealand
- 2001 – Fellow, Royal Society of New Zealand
- 2006 – Gold medal for Research Excellence, Christchurch School of Medicine and Health Sciences
- 2008 – Distinguished Research Medal, University of Otago
- 2008 – Sir Charles Hercus Medal for Biomedical Research (Royal Society of New Zealand)
- 2014 – Singapore Translational Research (STaR) Award, National Medical Research Council
- 2015 – Faculty Research Excellence Award, National University of Singapore
- 2020 – Christchurch Heart Institute recognised with Research Group Award as top University of Otago research centre for 2020
- 2021 – Inaugural Life Time Achievement in Research Award, Canterbury Medical Research Foundation

== Selected publications ==
- Davis, M., Espiner, E. A., Yandle, T., Richards, G., Town, I., Neill, A., ... & Billings, J. (1994). Plasma brain natriuretic peptide in assessment of acute dyspnoea. The Lancet, 343(8895), 440–444.
- Richards, A. M., Nicholls, M. G., Yandle, T. G., Frampton, C., Espiner, E. A., Turner, J. G., ... & Smyth, D. W. (1998). Plasma N-terminal pro–brain natriuretic peptide and adrenomedullin: new neurohormonal predictors of left ventricular function and prognosis after myocardial infarction. Circulation, 97(19), 1921–1929.
- Troughton, R. W., Frampton, C. M., Yandle, T. G., Espine, E. A., Nicholls, M. G., & Richards, A. M. (2000). Treatment of heart failure guided by plasma aminoterminal brain natriuretic peptide (N-BNP) concentrations. The Lancet, 355(9210), 1126–1130.
- Richards, A. M., Nicholls, M. G., Espiner, E. A., Lainchbury, J. G., Troughton, R. W., Elliott, J., ... & Yandle, T. G. (2003). B-type natriuretic peptides and ejection fraction for prognosis after myocardial infarction. Circulation, 107(22), 2786–2792.
- Januzzi, J. L., van Kimmenade, R., Lainchbury, J., Bayes-Genis, A., Ordonez-Llanos, J., Santalo-Bel, M., ... & Richards, M. (2006). NT-proBNP testing for diagnosis and short-term prognosis in acute destabilized heart failure: an international pooled analysis of 1256 patients: the International Collaborative of NT-proBNP Study. European heart journal, 27(3), 330–337.
- Hildebrandt, P., Collinson, P. O., Doughty, R. N., Fuat, A., Gaze, D. C., Gustafsson, F., ... & Richards, M. (2010). Age-dependent values of N-terminal pro-B-type natriuretic peptide are superior to a single cut-point for ruling out suspected systolic dysfunction in primary care. European heart journal, 31(15), 1881–1889.
- Than, M., Cullen, L., Reid, C. M., Lim, S. H., Aldous, S., Ardagh, M. W., ... & Richards, A. M. (2011). A 2-h diagnostic protocol to assess patients with chest pain symptoms in the Asia-Pacific region (ASPECT): a prospective observational validation study. The Lancet, 377(9771), 1077–1084.
- Lam, C. S., Teng, T. H. K., Tay, W. T., Anand, I., Zhang, S., Shimizu, W., ... & Richards, A. M. (2016). Regional and ethnic differences among patients with heart failure in Asia: the Asian sudden cardiac death in heart failure registry. European heart journal, 37(41), 3141–3153.
- Lam, C. S., Gamble, G. D., Ling, L. H., Sim, D., Leong, K. T. G., Yeo, P. S. D., ... & Doughty, R. N. (2018). Mortality associated with heart failure with preserved vs. reduced ejection fraction in a prospective international multi-ethnic cohort study. European heart journal, 39(20), 1770–1780.
- Chan, M. Y., Efthymios, M., Tan, S. H., Pickering, J. W., Troughton, R., Pemberton, C., ... & Richards, A. M. (2020). Prioritizing candidates of post–myocardial infarction heart failure using plasma proteomics and single-cell transcriptomics. Circulation, 142(15), 1408–1421.
