= Penney S. Azcarate =

American judge

- Education: George Mason University
- Occupation: Judge
- Known for: Depp v. Heard
- Spouse: Eddy Azcarate

Penney S. Azcarate is the chief judge of the circuit court in Fairfax County, Virginia. Azcarate is best known for presiding over the defamation case brought by actor Johnny Depp against his ex-wife Amber Heard.

== Early life and education ==
Azcarate served during the 1991 Persian Gulf War as a US Marine. After her service, she graduated from George Mason University School of Law at George Mason University in 1998 (renamed Antonin Scalia Law School in 2016).

== Judicial career ==
In 2008, Azcarate was elected by the General Assembly to serve as a judge in the General District Court for Fairfax County. She was the first woman to serve as the chief judge of that court. While a judge, Azcarate observed a high number of veterans developing criminal records as a result of PTSD. In 2014, she introduced a plan to create a special veterans' treatment docket in Fairfax County, with the goal of preventing veterans from getting criminal records and instead getting the treatment they needed. As a result of Azcarate's efforts, by 2016, Fairfax County established a Veterans Treatment Docket in each of its three courts, General District, Juvenile and Domestic Relations and Circuit Court.

On February 25, 2015, Azcarate was elected by the Virginia General Assembly to the 19th Judicial Circuit in Virginia, and took office on July 1. In 2021, she became the first female chief judge of that circuit. Azcarate's predecessor, chief judge Bruce D. White, handled early, pre-trial issues related to the Depp v. Heard case.
