= Order of Omega =

American collegiate honor society

- Ω
- Founded: April 14, 1959; 66 years ago University of Miami
- Type: Honor
- Affiliation: Independent
- Status: Active
- Emphasis: Greek letter organizations
- Scope: International
- Chapters: 575+
- Headquarters: 300 E Border St. Arlington, Texas 76010; United States
- Website: www.orderofomega.org

The Order of Omega is an undergraduate Greek society recognizing "fraternity men and women who have attained a high standard of leadership in inter-fraternity activities." It functions as an adjunct to traditional fraternal organizations rather than a social or professional group in se. It is not an academic honor society; a minimum grade point average is only one of six criteria for admission.

== History ==
The Order of Omega was established in 1959 at the University of Miami. It sought to differentiate itself from the long-standing Greek honors society of Phi Beta Kappa by emphasizing community service and inter-Greek communication over academic and nominal honors. At that time, the group adopted as its mark the Greek letter omega in gold on an ivory field. The organization was unique to the University of Miami until, in 1967, a second charter was granted to begin a chapter at University of Southern Mississippi. The group remained exclusive to men until 1977.

In more recent years, the order has emerged as a moot arena in which the fraternity and sorority community can air progressive changes to its member organizations as a whole; the 'dry' movement eschewing alcohol use among many groups drew a great deal of support from discussion in the early 1980s about how to improve the general reputation of the Fraternity/Sorority community. The stated purposes of the organization are:

- To recognize those fraternity men and women who have attained a high standard of leadership in interfraternity activities, to encourage them to continue along this line, and to inspire others to strive for similar conspicuous attainment;
- To bring together outstanding fraternity men and women to create an organization that will help to mold the sentiment of the institution on questions of local and intercollegiate fraternity affairs.
- To bring together members of the faculty, alumni, and student members of the institution's fraternities and sororities on a basis of mutual interest, understanding, and helpfulness;
- To help create an atmosphere where ideas and issues can be discussed openly across Greek lines and to help work out solutions.

At present, the order maintains over 575 chapters at colleges and universities in the United States and Canada.
