= NEJ v Wood =

NEJ v BDZ (Helen Wood)
- Court: High Court of Justice (Queen's Bench Division)
- Decided: 13 April 2011
- Citation: [2011] EWHC 1972 QB

Case history
- Related actions: NEJ v Helen Wood and Person Unknown

Court membership
- Judge sitting: The Hon. Mr. Justice King

NEJ v BDZ (Helen Wood) ([2011] EWHC 1972 (QB) is a 2011 High Court case involving issues of privacy in English law.

On 13 April 2011, Mr. Justice King granted an anonymised privacy injunction (often erroneously referred to as a superinjunction), preventing the publication of details of an alleged extra-marital relationship between NEJ (described as "a world famous celebrity" and "an actor, well-known to the public"), and BDZ, a prostitute who claimed to have met and had sex with the actor in Dublin in December 2009. At the 13 April hearing, the judge allowed BDZ to be named as 23-year-old Helen Wood of Bolton, Greater Manchester. In its original form as granted by Mr. Justice Blake on 9 April 2011, the injunction had prevented the UK media from naming either party or reporting the reason why the injunction had been sought.

The case sparked a debate about whether the newspapers that wanted to publish Ms Wood's claims had a public interest defence based on Article 10 of the European Convention on Human Rights, which guarantees the right to freedom of expression, or whether NEJ was entitled to privacy in accordance with Article 8 of the European Convention on Human Rights, which guarantees the right to respect for private and family life. There was criticism that, as in CTB v News Group Newspapers, the court had allowed the woman involved to be named, but not the man. In his decision published in July 2011, Mr. Justice King explained that Wood had been named as she did not seek anonymity, and had offered information about the case to The Sun. In an interview on BBC Radio 5 Live in May 2011, Helen Wood criticised the injunction, saying that the publication of some of the alleged names of persons involved in injunctions on Twitter had made "a mockery" of the law.

As of November 2011, the injunction preventing the naming of NEJ remains in place.

== See also ==
- 2011 British privacy injunctions controversy
- Ferdinand v Mirror Group Newspapers
- Human Rights Act 1998
