= Dan Wootton =

Journalist and broadcaster (born 1983)

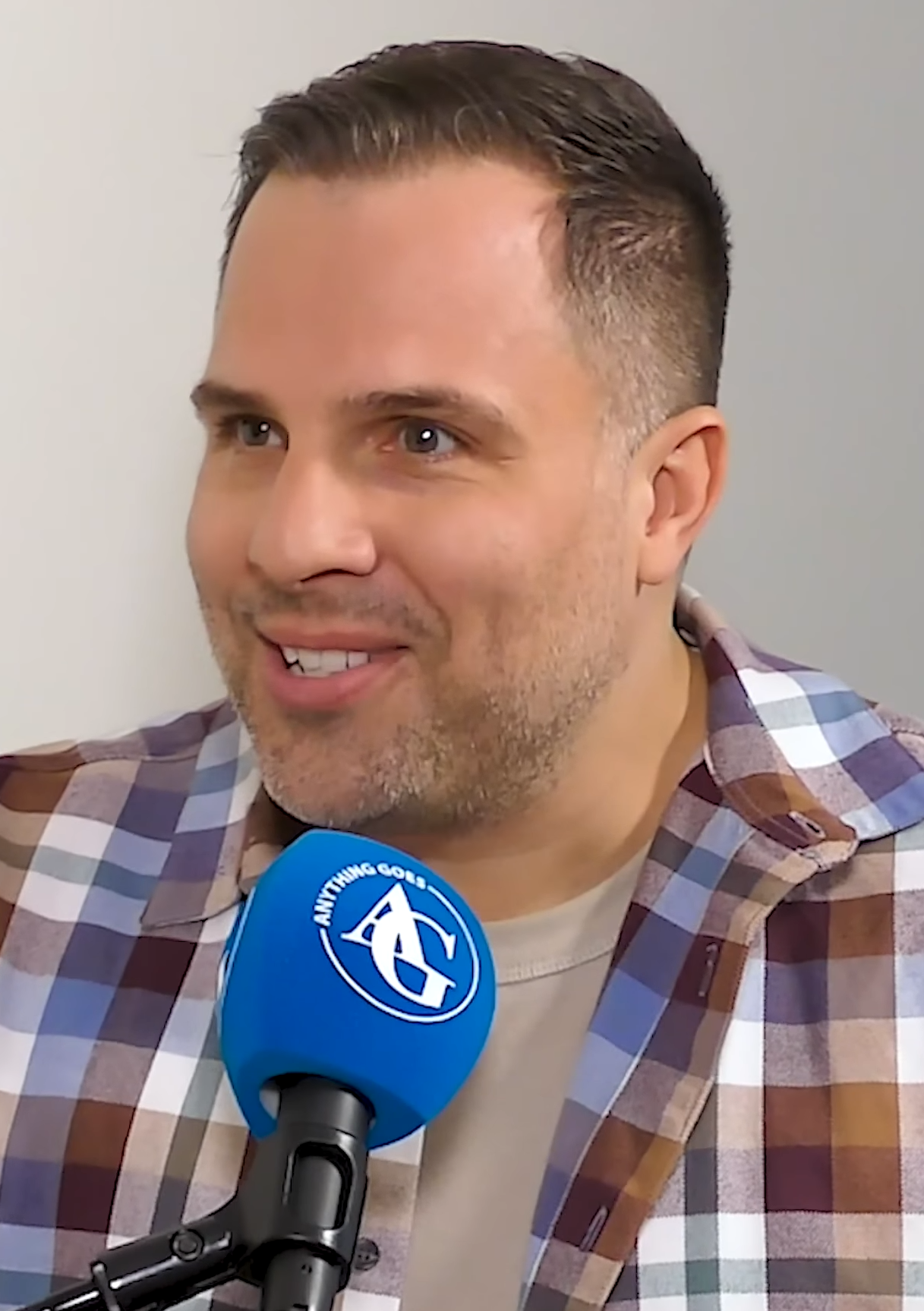
- Wootton in 2024
- Born: Daniel John William Wootton; 2 March 1983 (age 43); Wellington, New Zealand
- Citizenship: New Zealand; United Kingdom
- Education: Victoria University of Wellington (BA)
- Occupations: Journalist; broadcaster
- Partner(s): Alan Longair (2020–present; engaged)
- Website: www.danwoottonoutspoken.com

Daniel John William Wootton (born 2 March 1983) is a New Zealand and British journalist and broadcaster.

In 2007, he joined the News of the World. In 2013, he joined The Sun on Sunday and became editor of the "Bizarre" column the following year. In February 2016, he joined The Sun, under the editorship of Victoria Newton, as associate editor and in March 2018 progressed to executive editor. Wootton has made appearances as a show business presenter on the ITV Breakfast shows Lorraine and Daybreak. From 2015 to 2018, he was also a regular contributor and panelist on Big Brother's Bit on the Side. In 2021 Wootton left News UK to join the MailOnline as a columnist and present a show, four days a week, on GB News.

In July 2023, Byline Times published allegations that Wootton used fake identities to deceive men, including a former colleague, into sending sexually explicit images and exchanges to him. Police investigations ended without further action, though a civil case over some allegations has continued through the courts.

Wootton was suspended from GB News in September 2023 following an incident in which sexually disparaging comments were made on his show by guest Laurence Fox about journalist Ava Evans, which were described by the channel as "totally unacceptable". Wootton apologised and said that he should have intervened. His contract with MailOnline was subsequently terminated and Ofcom opened an investigation into the incident, which concluded that the show breached their broadcasting rules.

Wootton announced his departure from GB News on the social network X, saying he was to launch an independent platform, Dan Wootton Outspoken, a day after Ofcom's report was released on 4 March 2024.

== Early life ==
Daniel John William Wootton was born in Wellington, New Zealand, on 2 March 1983 to British parents; his mother was born in Basildon, Essex and his father was born on a British army base in Malta. Wootton grew up in Lower Hutt, and attended Naenae College and Victoria University of Wellington, where he obtained a Bachelor of Arts degree in media studies and political science.

== Career ==
Wootton started his career as a journalist in New Zealand, writing an entertainment column for the Wellington-based broadsheet newspaper The Dominion Post and reporting for the daily television show Good Morning. He emigrated to the United Kingdom when he was 21 and, after a period working for trade magazines, joined Broadcast magazine.

Wootton joined the News of the World TV team in February 2007, becoming TV editor in November 2007, and show-business editor from November 2008 until its closure in July 2011; he then became a columnist and feature writer for the Daily Mail and editor-at-large for Now magazine. He later testified to the Leveson Inquiry in 2012 about the News International phone hacking scandal, denying illegally publishing stories collected through phone hacking while an editor at the News of the World.

In 2013, Wootton joined The Sun newspaper, launching a new column on Sundays. He became editor of the newspaper's Bizarre column in 2014, and was promoted to associate editor (showbiz and TV) in 2016. In March 2018, he progressed to executive editor. He was named 'Showbiz reporter of the year' at the 2010, 2013 and 2018 British Press Awards. Wootton also made appearances as a showbiz reporter on ITV's morning show Lorraine between 2011 and 2019, and was a guest on BBC Radio 5 Live.

In 2015, Wootton and The Sun received widespread criticism for an article he wrote for the newspaper entitled "Hollywood HIV Panic". HIV policy adviser Lisa Power called it "vile" and expressed disappointment that Wootton had "lent his name to such a shameful piece", saying that it reinforced stigma against people with HIV. British HIV charity the Terrence Higgins Trust called it "irresponsible", while The BMJ, a peer-reviewed medical journal, also criticised the article.

Wootton hosted a weekly Talkradio show called Dan's Dilemmas from March 2018 and, in February 2020, took over the station's drivetime show, replacing Eamonn Holmes.

Wootton has been credited with breaking the story about Megxit in The Sun on 8 January 2020, which prompted Prince Harry and Meghan, the Duke and Duchess of Sussex, to announce within hours their plans for stepping back from their royal duties. Wootton stated that he had been in contact with the couple's spokesperson on 28 December and gave them ten days' notice before the story broke, despite facing pressure from royal officials not to run the piece. Sources close to the couple later told The New York Times that they "felt forced to disclose their plans prematurely" as they learned about The Sun's intentions to publish the story. Wootton disputed the allegation as "they released the statement after we had published the story and had so much notice."

In July 2020, libel proceedings brought by Johnny Depp against Wootton and News Group Newspapers began in the High Court of Justice in the case of Depp v News Group Newspapers Ltd. The action related to an article published in 2018 in The Sun describing Depp as a "wife beater". On 2 November 2020, the court ruled in favour of News Group. Mr Justice Nicol found that assaults were proven to the civil standard in 12 of the 14 incidents reported by Amber Heard, and he concluded that The Sun's article was substantially accurate on the balance of probabilities. In 2022, Depp sued Heard in a separate defamation trial in the United States. This case had a different outcome, with the jury finding that Depp had proven all the elements of defamation, including that the statements were false, and that Heard defamed Depp with actual malice.

In January 2021, Wootton announced that he would leave The Sun and talkRADIO to become a columnist for MailOnline and present a daily show, four days a week, on GB News. In November 2021, his GB News programme, Tonight Live with Dan Wootton, was rebranded to Dan Wootton Tonight and shortened from three to two hours.

In February 2022, Andrew Brady, a former Apprentice contestant and ex-fiancé of Caroline Flack, was jailed for four months for harassing Wootton and making false accusations which the judge described as "deeply unpleasant nonsense".

On 26 September 2023, whilst appearing as a guest on Dan Wootton Tonight, fellow GB News presenter Laurence Fox made sexually disparaging comments about journalist Ava Evans of the news website Joe that the broadcaster deemed "totally unacceptable". Wootton, who could be seen laughing at points as Fox spoke, subsequently apologised, saying he should have intervened and had reacted "out of shock". Following the apology, private messages between Fox and Wootton, shared by Fox on Twitter, appeared to show Wootton reacting to the incident on GB News with laughing emojis. Fox was dismissed by GB News following the incident and Wootton was suspended pending an internal investigation. Ofcom, the government's broadcasting regulatory body, opened an investigation into the incident. The regulator received nearly 9,000 complaints about the episode in question – the highest number of complaints received of any broadcast on British television during 2023. On 28 September 2023, while already suspended, DMG Media terminated Wootton's contract and freelance column at MailOnline.

On 4 March 2024, Ofcom concluded that the show in September 2023 did breach their rules and that Fox's remarks "constituted a highly personal attack on Ms Evans and were potentially highly offensive to viewers", adding that Wootton's reaction and limited challenge "did not mitigate the potential for offence" and instead "exacerbated it by contributing to the narrative in which a woman's value was judged by her physical appearance". In July 2024, Ofcom discontinued a fairness and privacy complaint about another episode of Dan Wootton Tonight in which he had stated that he was the target of a smear campaign.

On 5 March 2024, Wootton announced that he had left GB News to launch an independent platform, Dan Wootton Outspoken.

=== Allegations by Byline Times ===
From July 2023, allegations were published against Wootton in Byline Times of inappropriate and criminal conduct, including catfishing former colleagues and orchestrating non-consensual voyeurism of victims using male pornographic actors. Wootton denied any criminality and said that he was the victim of a smear campaign. MailOnline suspended Wootton's freelance column pending an investigation. In early October 2023, the Metropolitan Police confirmed they had commenced an investigation into the allegations. On 21 February 2024 the Metropolitan Police said that they would not be taking any further action. Police Scotland was also reported not to be taking further action. Wootton said that he had been "completely cleared". News UK and DMG Media's separate investigations into Wootton's behaviour remain ongoing as of February 2024.

On 3 October 2023, Press Gazette reported that newspapers, including The Guardian and the Mirror, had removed stories from their news websites after a legal warning issued by Wootton's lawyer. On 28 February 2024, The Guardian published an apology to Wootton for its article the previous October and stated that they "paid a contribution to Mr Wootton's costs".

It has been alleged that Wootton has used the pseudonyms "Martin Branning" and "Maria Joseph" to deceive men, including a former colleague, into sending sexually explicit images and exchanges to him.

In early 2025, a civil case was brought by a former colleague against Wootton, alleging that he had obtained sexual images by deceit through impersonating a woman in online messages.

== Personal life ==
In December 2013, Wootton announced on his Twitter account that he is gay. In March 2023, Wootton confirmed that he was in a relationship with Alan Longair. On 11 June 2025, Wootton announced he was engaged to Longair.
