= YESS =

YESS may refer to:

- Youth Empowerment & Support Services, a youth empowerment and housing organization based in Edmonton, Canada
- Your Employment Settlement Service, a charity founded by Camilla Palmer

== See also ==
- Yes (disambiguation)
