= Johnny Depp trial =

Johnny Depp trial may refer to:

- Depp v News Group Newspapers Ltd, decided 2020
- Depp v. Heard, decided 2022
