= Peregrine Simon =

British judge (born 1950)

The Right Honourable Sir Peregrine Simon

Lord Justice of Appeal
- In office October 2015 – June 2020
- Monarch: Elizabeth II

Personal details
- Born: 20 June 1950 (age 76)
- Occupation: Judge
- Profession: Law

Sir Peregrine Charles Hugo Simon PC (born 20 June 1950), is a retired Lord Justice of Appeal.

== Education and career ==
He was educated at Westminster School and Trinity Hall, Cambridge. He was called to the Bar, Middle Temple in 1973. He was appointed as Queen's Counsel in 1991; as a Bencher in 1999 and Recorder in 1998.

He was knighted in 2002 on his appointment as a High Court judge (assigned to the Queen's Bench Division). He was appointed to the Court of Appeal in 2015 and upon this appointment he was sworn in as a member of Her Majesty's Most Honourable Privy Council. This gave him the Honorific Title "The Right Honourable" for life. He retired on 21 June 2020.

== Family ==
He is one of the three sons of Jack Simon, Baron Simon of Glaisdale and his second wife, the former Fay Pearson.

== Notable cases ==
- Barrow v Bankside Members Agency Ltd and another
- National Boat Shows (NBS) v Earls Court
- R v Incedal and Rarmoul-Bouhadjar
- FHR European Ventures LLP v Cedar Capital Partners LLC
