= 2011 British privacy injunctions controversy =

Flouting of law regarding censorship

The British privacy injunctions controversy began in early 2011, when London-based tabloid newspapers published stories about anonymous celebrities that were intended to flout what are commonly (but not formally) known in English law as super-injunctions, where the claimant could not be named, and carefully omitting details that could not legally be published. In April and May 2011, users of non-UK hosted websites, including the social media website Twitter, began posting material connecting various British celebrities with injunctions relating to a variety of potentially scandalous activities. Details of the alleged activities by those who had taken out the gagging orders were also published in the foreign press, as well as in Scotland, where the injunctions had no legal force.

In England and Wales, as in many other places, an injunction can be used as a gag order, in which certain details of a legal case, including identities or actions, may not be published. These were originally created to protect people whose lives might be at risk if their details were made public, such as child offenders. However, with the passing of the Human Rights Act 1998, which wrote the European Convention on Human Rights into UK law, judges began to use a passage of the Act to extend the powers of these legal rights to cover the right to privacy. An injunction whose existence and details may not be published, in addition to the facts or allegations injuncted, became informally known as a "super-injunction".

The controversy has led to a number of wider issues being publicly examined including freedom of the press, freedom of speech, online censorship, the effect of European treaties on the UK legal systems and fundamental constitutional issues regarding parliamentary privilege and the relation between the judiciary and parliament.

== The Guardian and Trafigura super-injunction ==
The first major publicised event involving the use of injunctions to prevent reporting in the UK was in October 2009, when The Guardian newspaper reported that it had been prevented by a legal injunction applied for by London libel lawyers Carter Ruck from covering remarks made in Parliament. Other sources, including The Spectator and the blogger Guido Fawkes, then speculated that it related to previous reports The Guardian had printed regarding the oil company Trafigura and their alleged waste dumping in the Ivory Coast.

The Guardian confirmed that Trafigura was the source of the gagging order, after the order was lifted the next day. The question that they were unable to report was from Labour MP Paul Farrelly:

To ask the Secretary of State for Justice, what assessment he has made of the effectiveness of legislation to protect (a) whistleblowers and (b) press freedom following the injunctions obtained in the High Court by (i) Barclays and Freshfields solicitors on 19 March 2009 on the publication of internal Barclays reports documenting alleged tax avoidance schemes and (ii) Trafigura and Carter-Ruck solicitors on 11 September 2009 on the publication of the Minton report on the alleged dumping of toxic waste in the Ivory Coast, commissioned by Trafigura.

The case did a great deal to arouse public suspicion of these types of injunction, eventually leading to a debate in the House of Commons, where Bridget Prentice, the Justice Minister, said that the government was concerned about the over-use of super-injunctions. She would consider whether further guidelines needed to be issued to the judiciary, and she stressed that the Parliamentary Papers Act 1840, which allowed the proceedings of Parliament to be reported without interference, was still in force.

== The Sun and celebrity injunctions ==
In April 2011, British daily newspaper The Sun started to publish stories about the alleged sexual behaviour of various celebrities, omitting details which it was barred from reporting, while the injunctions were in effect. The stories variously included Helen Wood, the prostitute who had previously attained notoriety for allegedly having sex with Premiership footballer Wayne Rooney and an unnamed married actor; Imogen Thomas, former Big Brother contestant and Miss Wales winner and Ryan Giggs, who was later named in the US and on Twitter as the married footballer; and around thirty other injunctions which had been granted in the preceding year.

This was followed by many supportive editorials in other newspapers, decrying the injunctions limiting of free speech, and their instigating a 'privacy law' by judicial precedent. The heavy coverage of this matter led to British Prime Minister David Cameron and culture secretary Jeremy Hunt expressing their own reservations about the manner in which the law was being enforced.

On 26 April 2011, following legal action by Private Eye editor Ian Hislop, an interview with BBC journalist and political correspondent Andrew Marr was published in the Daily Mail, in which he revealed that a super-injunction he had taken out in 2008 had prevented the reporting of an extramarital affair he had had with a female journalist. As his job often involved pointing out the hypocrisies of the politicians he interviews, he was roundly criticised by many commentators for his behaviour, including Ian Hislop himself, stating, "As a leading BBC interviewer who is asking politicians about failures in judgment, failures in their private lives, inconsistencies, it was pretty rank of him to have an injunction while working as an active journalist." Andrew Marr also stated that he was both embarrassed and uneasy about his actions.

== Injunctions reported by Private Eye ==
In its issue of 5 May 2011, Private Eye reported on further privacy injunctions, including ones forbidding publication of:

- "[t]he name of the entertainment company which sacked a female employee after an executive ended an extramarital affair with her and told bosses that 'he would prefer in an ideal world not to have to see her at all and that one or the other should leave.'"
- "how an author of best-selling books and newspaper columns drawing on his own personal life has blocked his ex-wife from writing a book of her own or talking to any journalists about her time with him" – later revealed as Jeremy Clarkson (AMM v HXW).
- "'Private information' that MoD [Ministry of Defence] adviser Bernard Gray – since appointed to the position of Chief of Defence Materiel – communicated to an individual, or who exactly that individual was."

== Twitter leaks ==
On 8 May 2011 an account on social networking site Twitter posted the alleged details of several of the injunctions that had been mentioned in the papers. Public interest was such that the record for visits to Twitter in the UK was exceeded, with one in every 200 visits being made that day to its website. On the same date, details revealing the identity of UK footballer Ryan Giggs who had obtained an anonymised injunction in the case of CTB v News Group Newspapers and the woman with whom he had an alleged affair, Imogen Thomas, were posted on Twitter and reported by international press sources. The allegations were repeatedly reposted by many users, in a pattern similar to that in the legal defence of the Twitter Joke Trial the year before, making it difficult to prosecute any one user. Nevertheless, legal action was instigated by the footballer against Twitter in an attempt to obtain information on which users were involved.

Some of the allegations have been strongly denied by those named. As these have been widely reported in the media, which would then break any injunction, it has been speculated that these details posted on Twitter were incorrect. Jemima Khan flatly denied the rumours involving her, tweeting, "Rumour that I have a super injunction preventing publication of 'intimate' photos of me and Jeremy Clarkson. NOT TRUE!" and, "I have no super injunction and I had dinner with Jeremy and his wife last night. Twitter, Stop!", finally labelling the rumours as "Vile hate tweets". Khan took no legal action for libel against either the poster or those who publicised the story. Final Score presenter Gabby Logan also spoke out against the allegation she had an affair with former England and Newcastle United footballer and fellow sports presenter Alan Shearer, stating that the controversy "is muddying the waters for people who have done nothing wrong."

=== Sunday Herald ===
On 22 May 2011, Scottish newspaper the Sunday Herald published on its front page a photo of Ryan Giggs, the footballer alleged to have had an extra-marital affair with Imogen Thomas. The picture showed Giggs with his eyes blanked out with the caption "CENSORED". The newspaper editor, Richard Walker, stated that the injunction applied only in England and Wales, and had no legal force in Scotland.

=== Journalist and alleged contempt of court ===
On 13 May 2011 Giles Coren, a journalist for the Times newspaper, attracted controversy by posting jokes on his Twitter web feed about Gareth Barry and privacy injunctions. They were later deleted, but had been archived. It was reported on 22 May 2011 that a journalist might be jailed over Twitter comments about injunctions, as the case had been referred to the Attorney General for England and Wales, Dominic Grieve.

=== ETK ===
ETK v News Group Newspapers Ltd is an anonymised privacy injunction that was reported in April 2011. ETK, a married man in the British entertainment industry, had an affair with X, a colleague. Some issues arising from the affair led to X losing her job. ETK won an injunction to prevent News Group Newspapers Ltd from disclosing his identity, to protect his children. The woman, X, also agreed to the injunction being sought.

On 5 June 2011, Irish tabloid newspaper the Sunday World published a story on its front page naming David Threlfall and Pauline McLynn as involved in the injunction. Other Irish media sources have published the names of the people involved in the injunction.

== Max Mosley ==
In another case, former F1 boss Max Mosley, who had some time before been the subject of a story in the News of the World about his actions and successfully sued the paper for breach of confidence, took the United Kingdom to the European Court of Human Rights, in an attempt to prevent stories about people's private lives being published without first warning those concerned. Knowing that a story was to be published, the subject could apply for an injunction prohibiting publication, effectively creating a privacy law. On 10 May 2011 Mosley lost the case, on the grounds that Article 8 of the European Convention on Human Rights (right to private and family life) did not require a pre-notification and that such a measure "might operate as a form of censorship prior to publication" due to the severity of the civil and criminal penalties and control thereof, violating its own Article 10 (freedom of expression and information).

== Jeremy Clarkson ==
In October 2011, Jeremy Clarkson voluntarily lifted a privacy injunction known as AMM v HXW, which had prevented the UK media from reporting claims by his former wife that they had an affair after he remarried. Clarkson commented: "Injunctions don’t work. You take out an injunction against somebody or some organisation and immediately news of that injunction and the people involved and the story behind the injunction is in a legal-free world on Twitter and the Internet. It’s pointless."

== Parliamentary privilege ==
On 10 March 2011, John Hemming invoked parliamentary privilege (where politicians under most circumstances cannot have civil or criminal proceedings brought against them for comments made within the scope of Parliamentary business) to reveal another super-injunction. The discussion involved an anonymised privacy injunction, concerning former Royal Bank of Scotland head Sir Fred Goodwin.

On 19 May 2011, the rule of privilege was invoked again, in the House of Lords, Lord Stoneham stated:

Does [my noble friend] accept that every taxpayer has a direct public interest in the events leading up to the collapse of the Royal Bank of Scotland? So how can it be right for a super-injunction to hide the alleged relationship between Sir Fred Goodwin and a senior colleague? If true, it would be a serious breach of corporate governance and not even the Financial Services Authority would be allowed to know about it.

On 23 May 2011, shortly following a ruling by the High Court to retain the injunction, John Hemming once again utilised parliamentary privilege to name the footballer who sought the injunction in a parliamentary question. The BBC initially declined to report the question or name given by Hemming, but later updated its website with the news that the player was Ryan Giggs. Sky News immediately named the player as Ryan Giggs after Hemming's speech.

With about 75,000 people having named Ryan Giggs on Twitter it is obviously impracticable to imprison them all and with reports that Giles Coren also faces imprisonment ... the question is what the Government's view is on the enforceability of a law which clearly does not have public consent?

Hemming was called to order mid-question by the speaker John Bercow who reminded the MP that "occasions such as this are for raising the issues and principles involved, not seeking to flout for whatever purpose"; however, the speaker permitted the MP to complete the question and took no disciplinary action against him.

== Report of judicial committee on super-injunctions ==
A report by a judicial committee led by Master of the Rolls Lord Neuberger reported on 19 May 2011 with a number of recommendations and observations:

- That the media be given advanced notice of any super-injunction to be passed (but not that the media should inform those to whom the allegations refer)
- That the judiciary had not created laws independent of parliament (a "privacy law") but that super-injunctions were being used too frequently and should be more time-limited.
- That reporting of statements made in the Commons or Lords, or in parliamentary committee, may not be covered by parliamentary privilege unless it can be proved they were published "in good faith and without malice". The report gave no judicial ruling or criteria as to statements which may or may not meet this criterion.

The report made no mention of the Internet or new media and how the courts would propose to enforce injunctions against non-UK publishers and non-UK hosted websites. However, commenting on the committee report, the then Lord Chief Justice, Lord Judge, stated that he believed ways would be found "similar to those used against child pornography" to prevent the "misuse of modern technology". Lord Judge has also commented on related technological challenges to the legal system such as use of Twitter in court and use of search engines by juries.

Lord Judge also commented on the wisdom of MPs and Lords using parliamentary privilege to subvert super-injunctions, asking "whether it's a very good idea for our lawmakers to be in effect flouting a court order because they disagree with the order or, for that matter, because they disagree with the law of privacy which parliament has created". In response, John Hemming MP accused the judiciary of attempting to gag parliament.

== British government position ==
David Cameron was reported in April 2011 to be "uneasy" with the use of super-injunctions. The Culture secretary Jeremy Hunt has stated that the Government does not intend to introduce a privacy law and that it would instead look towards clearer guidelines for judges ruling on injunctions. This was reaffirmed by David Cameron on 10 May 2011 when he blamed lack of parliamentary guidance forcing judges to rely on strict European law in their judgements. A spokesman for the Prime Minister welcomed the Neuberger report, stating that "We think this is a very useful report and it is something we will be considering very carefully." On 23 May 2011, speaking on ITV's Daybreak the Prime Minister stated that the law should be reviewed to "catch up with how people consume media today" and that the situation was "unsustainable". Ed Miliband, the leader of the opposition, commented that the law was "not working" and a review would be required.

== See also ==
- Ferdinand v Mirror Group Newspapers
- Kaye v Robertson
- MJN v News Group Newspapers Ltd
- NEJ v BDZ (Helen Wood)
- PJS v News Group Newspapers
- Privacy in English law
- Scots law
- Spycatcher
- Streisand effect
