= R v Incedal =

2014–2015 British terrorism case

R v Incedal and Rarmoul-Bouhadjar
- Court: Central Criminal Court, Court of Appeal
- Transcript: Court of Appeal decision on trial secrecy

R v Incedal and Rarmoul-Bouhadjar (2014), formerly known as R v AB and CD, is a criminal case brought in the United Kingdom against two people suspected of terrorism offences. It was proposed to make it the first criminal trial in British legal history to be held entirely in secret, but the Court of Appeal ruled in June 2014 that some details of the trial should be made public.

== Background ==
The existence of the prosecutions became publicly known on 4 June 2014, as the outcome of an application by The Guardian to the Court of Appeal to overturn a ban on publicly identifying the defendants, which had been issued the month before. The style of cause for the daylight order is Guardian News and Media Ltd v AB and CD. At the earlier closed hearing, Mr Justice Nicol had granted the Crown an order that the trial "should take place entirely in private with the identity of both defendants withheld" and with "a permanent prohibition on reporting what takes place during the trial and their identities". The Crown Prosecution Service had argued that they would be deterred from bringing the prosecution without an order for secrecy. The basis for this argument was not made public.

On 12 June 2014, Lord Justice Peter Gross, Mr Justice Simon and Mr Justice Burnett issued a ruling overturning the order with respect to the anonymity of the defendants and limiting the degree to which the trial could be heard in private. The ruling stated:

We express grave concern as to the cumulative effects of holding a criminal trial in camera and anonymising the defendants. We find it difficult to conceive of a situation where both departures from open justice will be justified. Suffice to say, we are not persuaded of any such justification in the present case.

The "core of the trial" remains secret, but the identities of the defendants and the outcome of the trial were ordered to be made public, as well as some details of opening remarks by the judge and prosecution. The court trying the case will have discretion to admit journalists to some parts of the trial, but will retain their notes until the end of the trial, when the court will review what content should or should not be allowed to be made public. The Crown Prosecution Service indicated that it did not intend to make any further appeal, and that the trial would go ahead. The trial was due to begin in London on 16 June 2014, but was rescheduled for October 2014.

== Arrests and charges ==
The defendants, Erol Incedal (initially known as AB) and Mounir Rarmoul-Bouhadjar (CD), were arrested on Mansell Street, Tower Hamlets, on 13 October 2013 at 7 pm. Two further arrests were made as part of the same operation, one in Peckham and the other in Notting Hill, but neither resulted in charges. It was said in court during the appeal by The Guardian that the defendants were arrested "under high profile circumstances".

Incedal was charged under s 5(1) of the Terrorism Act 2006 with making preparations for terrorist activity between February 2012 and October 2013. Rarmoul-Bouhadjar was charged with possession of an improperly obtained passport under the Identity Documents Act 2010. Both defendants were charged under s 58 of the Terrorism Act 2000 with possessing documents likely to be useful in the commission of terrorist activity; this allegedly referred to a document titled "bomb-making".

=== Early reaction ===
In early June 2014, Lord Chancellor and Secretary of State for Justice Chris Grayling defended the order for secrecy, saying: "If it is in the interests of justice for the judge to take a decision one way or the other, so be it, that's why we have them. That's why we trust the judges." The home secretary Theresa May and the foreign secretary William Hague, had both submitted certificates requesting the trial to be held in total secrecy. The order was criticised by Shami Chakrabarti of Liberty for its "extensive restrictions set without robust reasons or a time limit".

Questions about the effect of holding a secret trial were asked by Sadiq Khan, who was the Shadow Secretary of State for Justice, and Keith Vaz, who was the Chairman of the Home Affairs Select Committee. The Daily Telegraph's Philip Johnston likened the trial to the Inquisition and the Star Chamber. Columnist Jenny McCartney pointed out that over three decades of terrorism in Northern Ireland, a criminal trial had never before been conducted in absolute secrecy. Melanie Phillips argued that holding the trial in total secrecy was justified. On 12 June 2014, Conservative MP Dominic Raab asked for a debate in the Commons over a bid to hold a terror trial in complete secrecy. The former Foreign Office lawyer, who had worked with the intelligence services, said that even after the ruling to lift some of the restrictions, only "hand-picked" journalists would be allowed to cover the trial.

== Trials ==
One of the two defendants, Mounir Rarmoul-Bouhadjar, aged 26, pleaded guilty the week of 6 October 2014 to the possession of a terrorist document.

=== First trial ===
The other defendant, Erol Incedal, also aged 26, denied two charges at the Old Bailey in London on 14 October 2014: one offence of preparing acts of terrorism and the other offence of possessing a document entitled Bomb Making. The charges stem from examination of objects in the possession of Incedal, who was arrested while driving a black Mercedes. A paper was found hidden amongst his possessions which listed the residential address of Tony Blair.

On 31 October 2014, Incedal denied terrorism offences, saying he had contemplated committing an armed robbery or buying heroin or a gun instead. On 11 November 2014 it was reported that, for undisclosed reasons, the trial jury had been discharged but that a retrial would be sought. On 17 November 2014, the jury convicted Incedal on the charge of possession of terrorist information, but the jury failed to reach a verdict on another charge of preparing an act of terrorism.

=== Re-trial ===
On 26 March 2015, Incedal was acquitted by the jury on the charge of preparing an act of terrorism. The details of Incedal's successful defence remain subject to secrecy. A small part of the trial was heard in the presence of ten accredited journalists, and a small proportion in open court. In December 2015 transcripts detailing part of Incedal's defence were released. A challenge in the High Court was made by the news media, citing the principle of open justice. The Lord Chief Justice was expected to rule on the media challenge in January 2016; the ruling came through on 9 February and the gagging order was upheld.

== Reactions ==
On 12 November 2014, Lord Thomas, the Lord Chief Justice, said clearer rules were needed to prevent major trials being heard entirely in secret. Henry Irving and Judith Townend concluded that there was a need for coherence across cases. They observed how "information control measures should be uniform and cover all sources of news. In situations like the Incedal case, clearer rules were needed to protect the public interest in freedom of expression and access to criminal trials."
