= CTB v News Group Newspapers Ltd =

UK legal case

CTB v News Group Newspapers
- Court: High Court of Justice (Queen's Bench Division)
- Full case name: CTB v News Group Newspapers Limited & Anor
- Decided: 16 May 2011
- Citation: [2011] EWHC 1232 QB

Case history
- Related actions: CTB v. Twitter Inc., Persons Unknown

Court membership
- Judge sitting: David Eady

CTB v News Group Newspapers is an English legal case between Manchester United player Ryan Giggs, given the pseudonym CTB, and defendants News Group Newspapers Limited and model Imogen Thomas.

On 14 April 2011, Mr Justice Eady granted first a temporary injunction at the High Court in London, preventing the naming of the footballer in the media, then extending it on 21 April 2011. The injunction was initially intended to prevent details of the case – an alleged extra-marital relationship between Giggs and Thomas – from being published in The Sun. The ruling of the court was based on Article 8 of the European Convention on Human Rights, which guarantees the right to respect for private and family life.

Following the publication of details of the gagging order on Twitter, naming Giggs as the footballer involved, there was widespread discussion in the UK and international media on the issue of how court injunctions can be enforced in the age of social media websites.

On 23 May 2011, Justice Eady rejected News Group Newspapers' application to lift the injunction, despite pressure from the public and government. Later the same day, Liberal Democrat MP John Hemming used parliamentary privilege to name Ryan Giggs as CTB.

== Background ==
On 14 April 2011, The Sun published a story entitled "Footie star's affair with Big Brother's Imogen Thomas". It claimed that "a Premier League star" had met Thomas at luxury hotels during a "six-month fling", but did not name the footballer involved.

According to The Sunday Times, the first mention on Twitter of the alleged relationship between Giggs and Thomas may have been posted at 10:02 PM BST by James Webley on 14 April 2011, the day of the initial granting of the injunction. Webley is a UK citizen from Guildford with the Twitter username "@unknownj". Webley denied being the source of the leak, and pointed to a web page written by a man named Michael Wheeler that he had read on the same day, which he said strongly hinted that Giggs was the person involved.

On 8 May 2011, an account on social networking site Twitter was created under the name "Billy Jones", and posted the alleged details of several of the anonymised privacy injunctions that had been mentioned in the media. This included the claim that the married footballer known as CTB had been involved in a seven-month extra-marital relationship with model Imogen Thomas. While Thomas could be named in the UK media, the identity of CTB could not. On the same date, messages saying that the identity of claimant CTB was Manchester United player Ryan Giggs were posted on Twitter and subsequently reported in a number of non-UK media sources. The allegations were repeatedly reposted online by other users, in a similar response to that of the Twitter Joke Trial the year before.

In delivering his ruling on the case on 16 May 2011, Eady argued: "It will rarely be the case that the privacy rights of an individual or of his family will have to yield in priority to what has been described in the House of Lords as 'tittle-tattle about the activities of footballers' wives and girlfriends.'" He also argued that a balance had to be struck between Article 8 of the European Convention on Human Rights, which guarantees the right to privacy, and Article 10 of the European Convention on Human Rights, which guarantees the right to freedom of expression. Eady denied in the ruling that he was "introducing a law of privacy by the back door", which had been a common criticism of his decisions in the UK media, and stated that the principles involved in the ruling were "readily apparent from the terms of the Human Rights Act, and indeed from the European Convention itself." The Human Rights Act 1998 had been passed by the UK government, and incorporated the terms of the Convention into UK law.

The ruling also suggested that Imogen Thomas had attempted to blackmail the footballer for £50,000 and £100,000, a claim she strongly denied. Following a failed attempt by The Sun to lift the injunction on 16 May 2011, Thomas commented: "Yet again my name and reputation have been trashed while the man I had a relationship with is able to hide. What's more I can't even defend myself because I have been gagged. If this is the way privacy injunctions are supposed to work there is something seriously wrong with the law." Eady said that he could not "come to any final conclusion" on whether there had been an attempt at blackmail.

It was stated in the ruling that Imogen Thomas had "at some stage engaged the services of Mr Max Clifford", the well-known UK publicist, and that the purpose of meetings Thomas had arranged with the footballer had been "that The Sun was ready to take advantage of these prearranged meetings in order to be able to put forward the claim that it was The Sun which had found him 'romping with a busty Big Brother babe'".

== Legal action after posts on Twitter ==
A tweet in May 2011 was repeatedly reposted, leading to controversy over the right to privacy in the UK.

Using London-based law firm Schillings as an advisor, action has been undertaken by the footballer against Twitter in an attempt to obtain information on some of the users involved in naming Giggs. The action is known as CTB v. Twitter Inc., Persons Unknown. A blogger for Forbes magazine remarked: "Giggs has not heard of the Streisand effect", observing that mentions of his name had significantly increased after the case against Twitter had been reported in the news. According to measurement company Experian Hitwise, traffic on Twitter in the UK rose by 22% after the action was reported. Peter Preston, former editor of The Guardian, compared the CTB situation to the Spycatcher affair of the 1980s, in which Peter Wright's book had been openly on sale in Australia and other countries, despite being banned in the UK.

The headquarters of Twitter are in San Francisco, and legal experts pointed out the difficulties in suing in a United States court, where First Amendment protection applies to freedom of speech. London-based lawyer James Quartermaine commented: "Twitter will probably just ignore it and consider it to be offensive to their First Amendment rights. It's probably an attempt to try and show that actions have consequences in cyberspace." On 21 May 2011, lawyers at Schillings denied that they were suing Twitter, and said that they had made an application "to obtain limited information concerning the unlawful use of Twitter by a small number of individuals who may have breached a court order."

== Sunday Herald article ==
The Sunday Herald front page on 22 May 2011.

On 22 May 2011, the Sunday Herald, a Scottish newspaper, published a thinly-disguised photograph of Ryan Giggs on its front page, with the word "CENSORED" covering his eyes. The paper added in its editorial column, "Today we identify the footballer whose name has been linked to a court superinjunction by thousands of postings on Twitter. Why? Because we believe it is unsustainable that the law can be used to prevent newspapers from publishing information that readers can access on the internet at the click of a mouse." The Sunday Herald also stated: "We should point out immediately that we are not accusing the footballer concerned of any misdeed. Whether the allegations against him are true or not has no relevance to this debate. The issue is one of freedom of information and of a growing argument in favour of more restrictive privacy laws."

Giggs' lawyers had not applied for an interdict (injunction) at the Court of Session in Edinburgh. This meant that the London High Court ruling had no force in Scotland, unless copies of the Sunday Herald were sold in England or Wales. Sunday Herald editor Richard Walker indicated to the BBC that the Herald was not sold in England or Wales, and added that the footballer's name and photo were exclusive to the print edition and had not been posted on the newspaper's website. Dominic Grieve, the Attorney General for England and Wales, said that no legal action was planned against the Sunday Herald.

== Naming in Parliament and subsequent events ==
On 23 May 2011, Eady refused a fresh application from The Sun to lift the injunction and allow CTB to be named. He argued that "the court's duty remains to try and protect the claimant, and particularly his family, from intrusion and harassment so long as it can." The Sun had argued that the injunction was "futile" given the level of knowledge of the footballer's name.

The same afternoon, Liberal Democrat Member of Parliament John Hemming spoke in the House of Commons and used parliamentary privilege to name Ryan Giggs as the footballer CTB. A second attempt by The Sun to overturn the injunction later in the day was rejected by Mr Justice Tugendhat, who argued "this is not about secrecy, this is about intrusion."

On 15 December 2011, Mr Justice Eady accepted that Thomas had not attempted to blackmail the footballer known as CTB, and suggested "There is no longer any point in maintaining the anonymity." The injunction preventing the naming of CTB remained in place.

On 21 February 2012, Ryan Giggs consented in the High Court to being named as the claimant known as CTB. Hugh Tomlinson, acting for Giggs, said that his client was claiming damages from The Sun for the subsequent re-publication of information in other newspapers and on the Internet. For The Sun's owners News Group Newspapers, Richard Spearman said: "We didn't identify him. We didn't intend to identify him. On the damages for publication, it is dead in the water, this case." On 2 March 2012, Mr Justice Tugendhat refused to grant relief to Giggs, ending the claim for damages.

== Reactions ==
In response to criticism of previous super-injunctions in the UK media, a report by a committee of judges headed by Master of the Rolls Lord Neuberger was published on 20 May 2011. It recommended that super-injunctions "can only be granted when they are strictly necessary". Kenneth Clarke, the Lord Chancellor and Secretary of State for Justice, also indicated that the law on privacy in the UK will be reviewed in the light of controversies over privacy injunctions. Lord Judge, the Lord Chief Justice of England and Wales, commented that modern technology was "out of control", and called for measures to prevent court injunctions from being breached on the web.

David Cameron, the prime minister of the United Kingdom, said on ITV1's Daybreak on 23 May 2011: "It is rather unsustainable, this situation, where newspapers can't print something that clearly everybody else is talking about, but there's a difficulty here because the law is the law and the judges must interpret what the law is. What I've said in the past is, the danger is that judgments are effectively writing a new law which is what parliament is meant to do." He added that the law should be reviewed to "catch up with how people consume media today".

Alex Salmond, the first minister of Scotland, commented: "The law essentially is a practical thing. It looks to me like the English law, English injunctions, look increasingly impractical in the modern world."

Member of Parliament John Hemming, who named Ryan Giggs in the House of Commons, described the affair as "a joke", and commented: "The judges' application of privacy law, which is ill conceived to start with, is now close to breaking point, under pressure from the biggest act of civil disobedience seen for many years."

Wikipedia co-founder Jimmy Wales commented in an interview with The Independent: "This only became a story because the footballer is pursuing legal action against Twitter. In the UK, I think the system is going to have to change. People are going to realise that it is an infringement of the right to free speech. People are going to get sick of the rich and powerful being able to suppress things they do not want to get out."

Lord Wakeham, the chairman of the Press Complaints Commission between 1995 and 2001, described the situation surrounding privacy injunctions as "a shambles", and proposed that Parliament should amend the law so that judges would be able to grant injunctions only where issues "impact on public authorities and the State".

Sir Tim Berners-Lee, the inventor of the World Wide Web, expressed concern about the use of Twitter to break court injunctions, arguing that the site was "not a place for reasoned discussion".

Tony Wang, the head of Twitter in Europe, said that people who do "bad things" on the site would need to defend themselves under the laws of their own jurisdiction in the event of controversy, and that the site would hand over information about users to the authorities when it was legally required to do so.

In The Sunday Times on 29 May 2011, Ryan Giggs' barrister Hugh Tomlinson QC commented: "I advise my clients that an injunction will not be effective. There have been too many examples of people breaking injunctions, getting round them by releasing material on to the Internet." He also suggested creating a statutory tort of privacy.

== See also ==
- 2011 British privacy injunctions controversy
- Ferdinand v Mirror Group Newspapers
- Mosley v News Group Newspapers Limited
- Privacy in English law
- Scots law
