= Depp v News Group Newspapers Ltd =

2020 libel trial in London, England

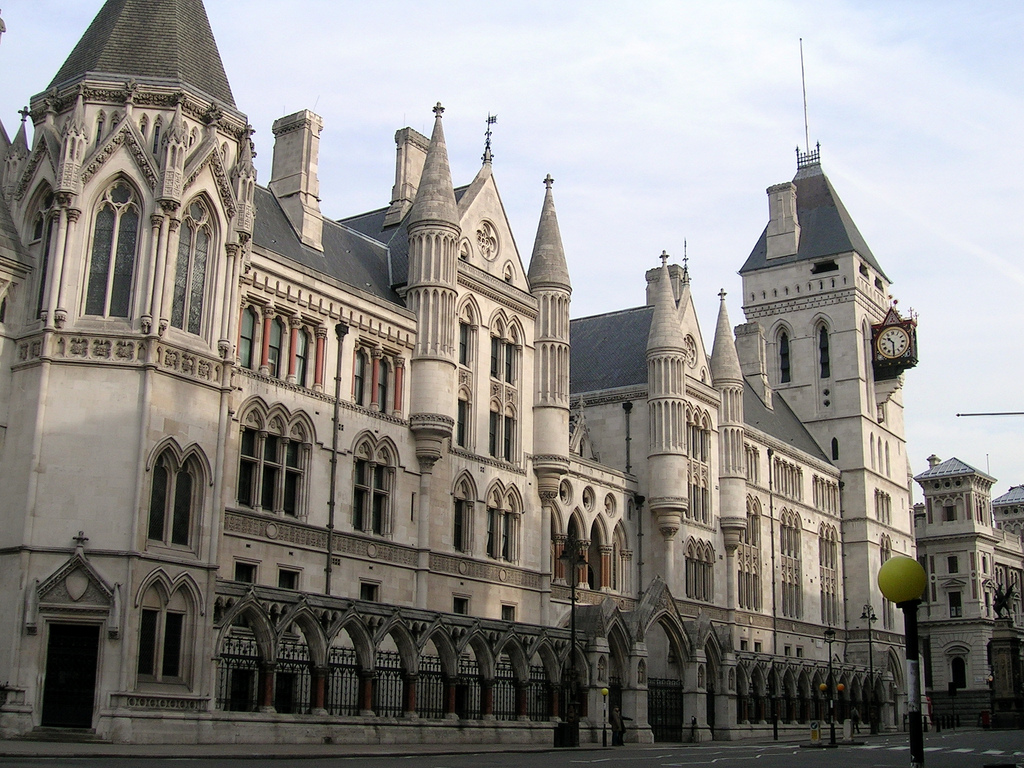
- Royal Courts of Justice
- Court: High Court of Justice
- Full case name: John Christopher Depp II v (1) News Group Newspapers Ltd, and (2) Dan Wootton
- Decided: 2 November 2020
- Citation: EWHC 2911 (QB)
- Transcript: BAILII

Case history
- Prior actions: [2019] EWHC 1113 (QB); [2020] EWHC 505 (QB); [2020] EWHC 1237 (QB); [2020] EWHC 1689 (QB); [2020] EWHC 1734 (QB); (all interlocutory)

Court membership
- Judge sitting: Mr Justice Nicol

Keywords
- defamation; libel; assault and battery; domestic violence

Depp v News Group Newspapers Ltd [2020] EWHC 2911 (QB) was a defamation lawsuit brought in England. The case was initiated by American actor Johnny Depp, who sued News Group Newspapers (NGN) and then-executive editor (Note: Victoria Newton was The Sun's editor-in-chief while Dan Wootton served as Executive Editor.) Dan Wootton for libel after The Sun ran an article (Note: The article was published online at 22:00, 27 April 2018 and its title was changed, according to court papers, at 7.58 am on 28 April 2018 with removal of an in-title "wife beater" reference.) that claimed Depp had abused his ex-wife and criticised his casting in the Fantastic Beasts film series. The article stated, "Overwhelming evidence was filed to show Johnny Depp engaged in domestic violence against his wife Amber Heard," who "recounted a detailed history of domestic abuse incidents, some of which had led to her fearing for her life." After a three-week trial in London in July 2020, Andrew Nicol, a High Court judge sitting without a jury, rejected Depp's claim in a verdict announced later that year, ruling that the published material was "substantially true".

In May 2016, Heard filed for divorce and for a temporary restraining order against Depp. In April 2018, The Sun, published by NGN, ran an article online originally titled "GONE POTTY How Can J K Rowling be 'genuinely happy' casting wife beater Johnny Depp in the new Fantastic Beasts film?", written by Dan Wootton, an executive editor at the paper. Depp sued NGN and Wootton for libel, stating that he wanted to clear his name and alleging that Heard had not only lied about the abuse but had in fact abused him. In their defence, NGN and Wootton alleged fourteen incidents of domestic abuse committed by Depp. During the highly publicised trial, both Heard and Depp testified in person.

In November 2020, the court published its judgement, rejecting Depp's claim against The Sun and ruling that he had assaulted Heard in 12 of the 14 alleged incidents and had put her in fear of her life. Depp's request to appeal the verdict was rejected as two Lord Justices of the Court of Appeal concluded that "it is clear from a reading of the judgment as a whole that the judge based his conclusions on each of the incidents on his extremely detailed review of the evidence specific to each incident" and therefore that the appeal had "no real prospect of success." Following the initial ruling, Depp stepped down from his role in the Fantastic Beasts series at the request of Warner Bros. The case was seen as damaging to the reputations and careers of both Depp and Heard.

== Background ==
=== Depp and Heard’s relationship ===
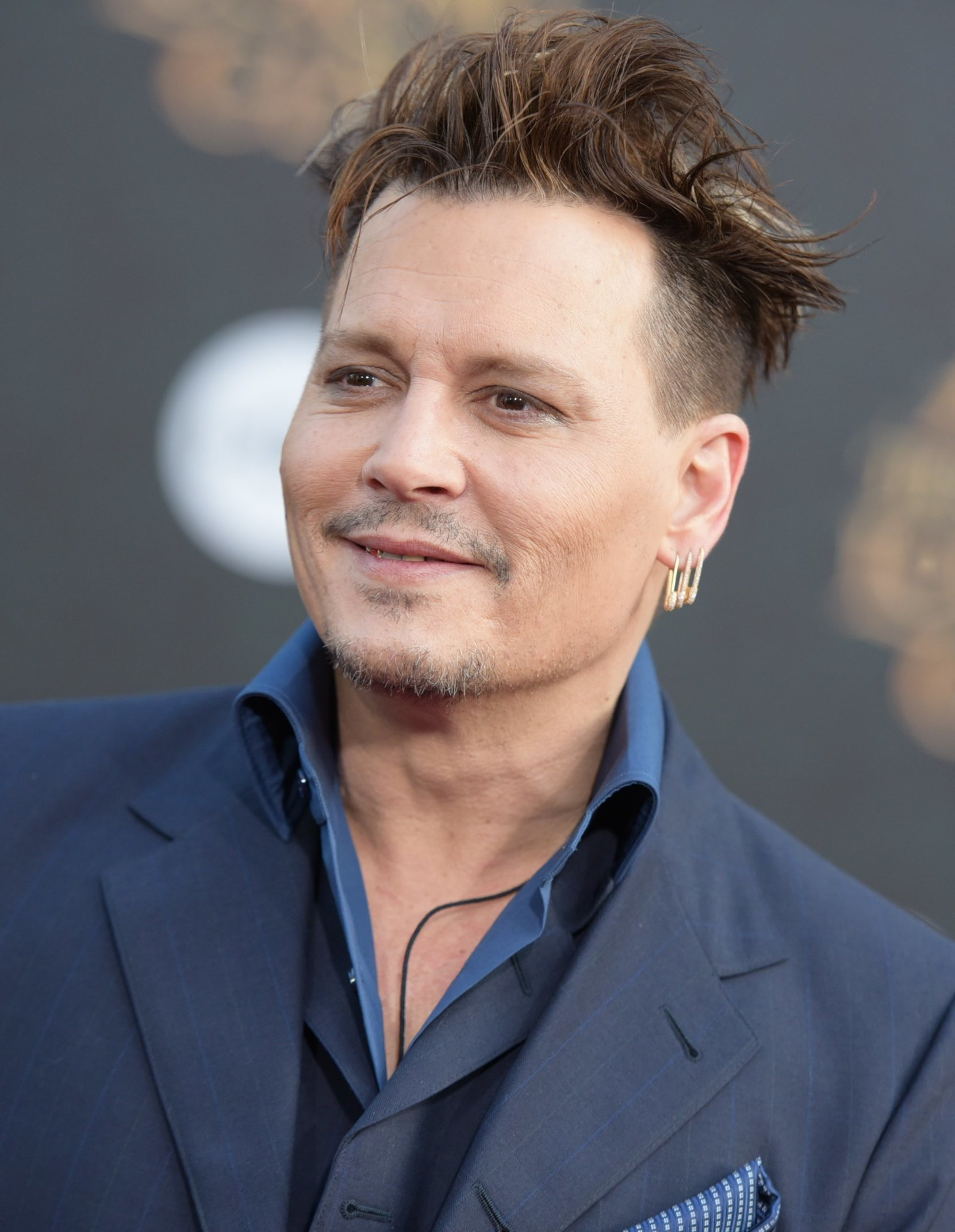
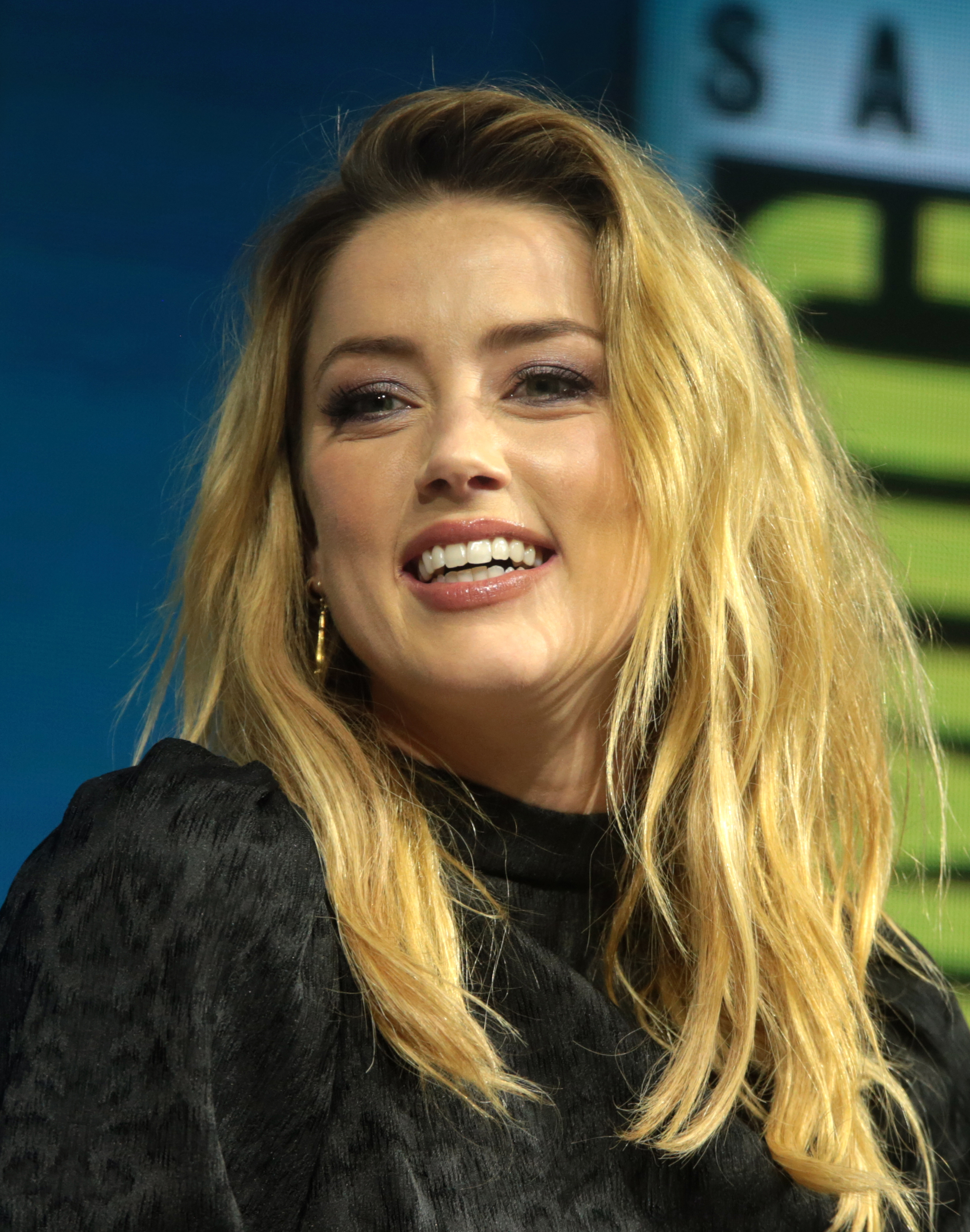
Johnny Depp (left) sued News Group Newspapers after The Sun published an article in 2018, which described him as a "wife-beater" due to allegations made by his ex-wife Amber Heard (right).

Actors Johnny Depp and Amber Heard began a relationship in around 2012 and married in Los Angeles in February 2015. Heard filed for divorce from Depp on 23 May 2016, and obtained a temporary restraining order against him, stating in her court declaration that he had been "verbally and physically abusive" throughout their relationship, usually while under the influence of alcohol and/or drugs. In response, Depp alleged that she was "attempting to secure a premature financial resolution by alleging abuse." Heard testified about the abuse under oath at a divorce court deposition. The divorce received a large amount of publicity, with alleged evidence, such as images of Heard's injuries, published by the media. A settlement was reached in August 2016, and the divorce was finalised in January 2017. Depp and Heard issued a joint statement saying that their "relationship was intensely passionate and at times volatile, but always bound by love. Neither party has made false accusations for financial gain. There was never any intent of physical or emotional harm." Depp paid Heard a settlement of US$7 million (£5 million), which she pledged to donate to the American Civil Liberties Union and the Children's Hospital Los Angeles. The settlement also included a non-disclosure agreement preventing either party from discussing their relationship publicly.

=== Depp's libel suit against News Group Newspapers and Dan Wootton ===
On 27 April 2018, the UK tabloid The Sun published online an article titled: "GONE POTTY How Can J K Rowling be 'genuinely happy' casting wife beater Johnny Depp in the new Fantastic Beasts film?". The article referred to Depp's casting as Gellert Grindelwald, one of the main characters in Fantastic Beasts: The Crimes of Grindelwald, based on a script by author J. K. Rowling. The online title originally described Depp as a "wife beater", but was changed shortly after publication and was never used in the printed version.

On 1 June 2018, Depp sued News Group News, the company publishing The Sun, and Dan Wootton for libel. He claimed that the aim of The Sun had been to convince their readers that he was a domestic abuser and to plea Rowling to drop him from the Fantastic Beasts film. Depp stated that he had initiated the lawsuit to clear his name, and alleged that Heard had instead been the aggressor in the relationship and had lied about being abused as part of a hoax. Depp's lawyers argued that many of the incidents presented by NGN were on a "she said – he said" basis, and that besides Heard, the only other first-hand witness for the alleged abuse was her sister. Although admitting that he used alcohol and drugs, Depp's lawyers denied that this had any significance.

Depp's legal team further argued that Heard could not have been abused because she had stayed in the relationship without calling the police and had met with him once more even after filing for divorce and a restraining order. As their key evidence of a hoax, Depp's lawyers claimed that stylist Samantha McMillen, who dressed Heard for The Late Late Show with James Corden—filmed a day after an alleged violent incident in December 2015 (#12)—had not seen any injuries on her. They also alleged that following the May 2016 incident (#14), elevator CCTV footage from Heard and Depp's apartment building did not show her with injuries, and neither members of the apartment building staff nor the two LAPD officers who were called to Depp and Heard's apartment saw any physical injuries on Heard. As for NGN's allegation that Heard and Depp referred to Depp's behaviour while under the influence of alcohol or drugs as "the monster", Depp's lawyers stated that this had been misinterpreted.

As evidence of Heard's alleged violence, Depp's lawyers presented two recordings of the couple's private discussions where Heard appeared to admit to having hit Depp and thrown items at him. The claim also relied on witness statements by three members of Depp's staff—Sean Bett, Kevin Murphy and Travis McGivern—who alleged to have witnessed Heard being verbally abusive towards Depp. McGivern also stated that he had seen Heard throw items at Depp in March 2015. Depp's team claimed that the injury that Depp suffered to his finger in Australia in 2015 was caused by a bottle thrown by Heard. Furthermore, they claimed to have evidence that Heard was emotionally volatile, had had extramarital affairs, and that she was a habitual user of alcohol and drugs. They also claimed that she was an unreliable witness.

==== Legal claims ====
In their claim, Depp's lawyers stated that NGN and Wootton alleged in their article that Depp "was guilty, on overwhelming evidence, of serious domestic violence against his then wife, causing significant injury and leading to her fearing for her life, for which [Depp] was constrained to pay no less than £5 million to compensate her, and which resulted in him being subjected to a continuing restraining order; and for that reason is not fit to work in the film industry." His lawyers claimed that, as such, "the publication of the [online and hard copy] articles has caused serious harm to his personal and professional reputation", which could be inferred from:

1. The seriousness of the allegations;
2. The huge extent of publication;
3. The effect of accusations of violence against women in the context of the widely known #Me Too/Time's Up movements;
4. The inclusion of quotes or purported quotes from women described as victims of Harvey Weinstein (the subject of high profile and serious criminal allegations);
5. The very likely intended effect of the articles was to finish the claimant's career.

In addition, Depp claimed he was entitled to damages as the article did not mention that:

1. The temporary restraining order was no longer in effect;
2. His denial of the allegations;
3. That the LAPD police officers who visited Depp and Heard's home in May 2016 after an alleged abusive incident concluded no crime had been committed;
4. That "the articles had misquoted and/or taken out of context remarks by Katherine Kendall, a #Me Too/Time's Up victim, and failed to correct the website article when Ms Kendall objected to being misquoted."

=== Defence presented by NGN and Wootton ===
In their defence, NGN and Wootton argued that the articles reported the truth, stating that Depp "beat his wife Amber Heard causing her to suffer significant injury and on occasion leading to her fearing for her life. ... Throughout their relationship the Claimant was controlling and verbally and physically abusive towards Ms Heard, particularly when he was under the influence of alcohol and/or drugs." They presented 14 separate incidents on which they alleged that Depp had been violent towards Heard. They stated that Depp had a severe substance abuse disorder, which exacerbated his rage and caused him to have blackouts that made him unable to remember what he had done while intoxicated. They alleged that Depp referred to this side of him as "the monster" and that "in periods of sobriety following Mr Depp's destructive rages, he recognised the problems he faced, apologised to Ms Heard and blamed what he described as "his illness". Furthermore, they accused Depp of misogyny, jealousy and controlling behaviour towards Heard.

NGN denied that this was a "she said – he said" case, instead stating that Heard's allegations were backed up by "witness testimony, medical evidence, photographs, video, audio recordings, digital evidence and Mr Depp's own texts" and that there were also many first-hand witnesses to his aggression. NGN stated that the fact the there were not many witnesses to the actual violence was because it had taken place behind closed doors, which is a common feature in domestic violence. NGN did allege that some violence had been witnessed by Depp's staff members, such as Stephen Deuters, but that they had later changed their statements to be more favourable to their employer. NGN contradicted Depp's claim that Samantha McMillen did not see any injuries on Heard, pointing out that in her witness statement, McMillen said that she had not seen any injuries herself, but that Heard had commented to her immediately after the taping of The Late Late Show about how her hair and makeup team had been successful in covering them up. NGN also alleged that ever since Heard filed for divorce in 2016, Depp had stated to other people that he wanted to end her career and to publicly humiliate her, and that his team had conducted a "campaign of vilification" against her. They stated that Depp was using old misogynistic tropes to discredit Heard, such as trying to portray her as "a gold-digger, a shrew and an adulterer".

Furthermore, NGN stated that Depp's team had tried to hide text messages that would be damaging to his case, only disclosing them when ordered to do so by the judge in spring 2020, and that they had tried to prevent Heard from disclosing evidence—such as witness statements—from the Virginia case (see below) by threatening her with sanctions.

==== Alleged violent incidents (perpetrated by Depp) ====
NGN presented the following 14 incidents where they alleged that Depp had been violent towards Heard:

- Incidents #1 and #2, early 2013: Depp, under the influence of alcohol and drugs, hit and shoved Heard on at least two occasions at her home.
- Incident #3, June 2013: During a weekend trip, an inebriated Depp had an altercation with a woman who he thought had made a sexual advance towards Heard, who had previously been in a relationship with a woman. After this, Depp and Heard returned to their rented trailer, where he threw glass at Heard and ripped her dress, as well as caused extensive damage to the trailer. Heard also made further claims which were heard in closed court due to their nature and have not been publicly disclosed.
- Incident #4, May 2014: An inebriated Depp verbally insulted, threw objects at and kicked Heard during a private plane flight.
- Incident #5, August 2014: Depp shoved and hit Heard during his detox from opioids on his private island in the Bahamas.
- Incident #6, December 2014: NGN claimed Depp had been violent but did not present further details.
- Incident #7, January 2015: At a hotel in Tokyo, an intoxicated Depp hit Heard, grabbed her by her hair, and shoved her to the floor, not allowing her to get back up.
- Incident #8, March 2015: Depp caused Heard "injuries including a broken lip, swollen nose, and cuts all over her body", and damaged a rented house they were staying in while he was filming the fifth installment of Pirates of the Caribbean in Australia. The incident took place over three days, during which Depp was high on drugs, and accidentally severed one of his fingers. He then used the stub to write insults about Heard to the house's walls. Heard also stated that he put out a burning cigarette on his own cheek. Heard also made further claims which were heard in closed court due to their nature and have not been publicly disclosed.
- Incident #9, March 2015: At their Los Angeles home, Depp began to destroy Heard's possessions and hit her. When Heard's sister, Whitney Henriquez, intervened, Depp tried to attack her, which led Heard to hit him.
- Incident #10, July 2015: Depp hit, pushed and choked Heard during a train trip in south-east Asia.
- Incident #11, November 2015: Depp, who had been using drugs, pushed Heard and threw items at her.
- Incident #12, December 2015: Depp assaulted Heard by hitting, shoving, head-butting, dragging her around their apartment by her hair, suffocating her with a pillow, and threatening to kill her. The next day, Heard was to appear in The Late Late Show with James Corden.
- Incident #13, April 2016: An inebriated Depp threw objects at Heard and pushed her at their LA apartment.
- Incident #14, May 2016: At their LA apartment, an inebriated Depp hit Heard, threw her phone at her face and dragged her by her hair, as well as broke items. Their neighbours and friends Elizabeth Marz, Raquel Pennington and Joshua Drew were present next door and intervened, with iO Tillett Wright, who had been on the phone with Heard during the incident, calling 911.

=== Pre-trial developments ===
In October 2018, Depp discussed the allegations against him in an interview published in GQ, where he denied them and stated that he would "never stop fighting" them. In response, Heard's lawyers claimed that he had broken the divorce settlement's non-disclosure agreement while at the same time refusing to allow Heard to present her side of the story publicly. In December 2018, The Washington Post published an op-ed by Heard in which she wrote about how becoming a public victim of domestic violence has negatively affected her career in Hollywood. In January 2019, the High Court denied NGN's filing for a stay of the present action as Heard, their main witness, would not be able to provide evidence due to the settlement NDA. In March 2019, Depp sued Heard for defamation over the op-ed in Fairfax County, Virginia, although neither his name nor the alleged violence were mentioned in the article. The case (Depp v. Heard) was scheduled to go to trial in April 2022.

Between 2018 and 2020, the public legal filings in both the Depp v NGN & Wootton case and Depp's Virginia defamation suit against Heard received frequent media attention. In February 2020, Depp changed his legal team from Brown Rudnick LLP to Schillings LLP, after his previous lawyers accidentally leaked 70,000 of his text messages to NGN's legal team. The following month, the judge ruled that Heard could testify on some of the incidents in closed court, and ordered Depp to disclose documents from the Virginia case. In May 2020, the judge ruled on a controversy between the parties that had arisen about Depp's team's wish to use witness statements from mechanic David Killacky and Heard's former assistant, Kate James, in their case. According to the ruling, Killacky's statement could not be used but James' could be. The following month, the defendants applied for the claim to be dismissed as Depp's team had not complied with the terms of the disclosure ruling given in March. In particular, Depp's team had not provided the defendants with text messages between Depp and his personal assistant, Nathan Holmes, in which he appeared to discuss obtaining illegal drugs. The judge ruled that Depp's team had breached the agreement, but declined to dismiss his claim. Later in the same month, Depp's team applied for third party disclosure from Heard, and in early July, days before the start of the trial, applied for her to be barred from the court room during the trial, except for when she would be appearing as a witness. Both of these applications were denied by the judge.

== Trial ==
Due to the COVID-19 pandemic, the trial was postponed from March 2020 to 7–28 July 2020. Depp was represented by Eleanor Laws QC, David Sherborne and Kate Wilson instructed by Schillings LLP, whereas NGN was represented by Sasha Wass QC, Adam Wolanski QC and Clara Hamer instructed by Simons Muirhead and Burton LLP. Due to COVID-19 restrictions and the public interest in the case, five courtrooms were used for the trial.

Both Depp and Heard testified in person. In addition, testimony was heard from the following individuals, both in person and via a video link:

On Depp's behalf	On NGN and Wootton's behalf
Stephen Deuters, former personal assistant to Depp, European president of his production company; Sean Bett, Depp's security guard; Travis McGivern, Depp's security guard; Malcolm Connolly, Depp's security guard; Starling Jenkins, Depp's security guard; Kevin Murphy, Depp's former estate manager; Tara Roberts, estate manager at Depp's island in the Bahamas; Ben King, Depp's former house manager; Samantha McMillen, Depp and Heard's stylist; Kate James, Heard's former personal assistant; Edward White, Depp's accountant; Isaac Baruch, Depp's friend and Depp and Heard's neighbour in 2016; Trinity Corrine Esparza, owner of the concierge service company at the LA apartment building that Depp and Heard lived in while married; Alejandro Romero, member of concierge service at Heard and Depp's apartment building; Hilda Vargas, member of Depp and Heard's cleaning personnel; Laura Divinere, Depp and Heard's interior decorator and Heard's friend; Melissa Saenz, LAPD officer who was called to Depp and Heard's apartment after incident #14; Katharine Kendall, actor and activist	Whitney Henriquez, Heard's sister; iO Tillett Wright, Heard's friend; Raquel Pennington, Heard's friend and Depp and Heard's neighbour in 2016; Josh Drew, ex-husband of Pennington and Depp and Heard's neighbour in 2016; Melanie Inglessis, Heard's friend and former make-up artist; Kristina Sexton, Heard's friend and former acting coach

In addition, Depp's team used depositions by LAPD officers Melissa Saenz and Tyler Hadden, a draft declaration by his former bodyguard Jerry Judge (who died in 2019), and a declaration by apartment building staff member Cornelius Harrell. They had also served a hearsay notice for Laura Divinere's declaration in the Virginia case. Depp's former partners Winona Ryder and Vanessa Paradis had also given witness statements, but were not called to give evidence by Depp and as such could not be cross-examined by the defendants. Both parties presented the court with other documents as well, which in total amounted to 13 lever arch files of material.

== Verdict ==
On 2 November 2020, Mr Justice Nicol found that assaults were proven to the civil standard in 12 of the 14 incidents reported by NGN, and this with the overarching considerations was sufficient to show that The Sun's article was substantially accurate on the balance of probabilities. The verdict found that while Depp had been successful in proving that the articles had been damaging to his reputation, his claim of libel had failed as the articles had been "substantially true". The court found no evidence to support Depp's claim of a hoax, stating that "if Ms Heard had been constructing a hoax there are various measures which she might have taken, but which she did not". The court accepted Heard's claim that her career and activism had been seriously damaged by going public about the abuse. The 129-page verdict examined all 14 alleged incidents, both alone and in context of the entirety of the evidence presented.

=== Depp's claim that Heard is not a reliable witness ===
The court did not accept Depp's claim that Heard was not a reliable witness. As the basis for this claim, Depp alleged that when Heard's British friend who had worked for her as an assistant in the UK had been visiting her in the US in 2014, she had actually been working as Heard's assistant without a working visa, and thus Heard had lied to the Homeland Security. The evidence supporting this was a statement from Heard's former assistant, Kate James, whose employment had been terminated in acrimonious circumstances, and which the judge therefore did not regard as reliable. A check made out to Savannah McMillian (the alleged assistant) from Amber Heard over $1625 referred to by Heard as "payments". Amber Heard confessed to writing out checks to McMillian multiple times. According to Heard these "payments" would cover expenses for both Heard and McMillian like shopping and errands. The judge accepted Heard's claim that McMillian was not her assistant in the USA but in other jurisdictions. Depp also alleged that Heard had tried to get both James and Depp's assistant Kevin Murphy to make or help in procuring false statements to help the couple to travel with their dogs on two occasions, one of which was the trip to Australia in 2015, when Heard was prosecuted for failing to properly declare the dogs. The court did not find that the evidence presented supported this. Furthermore, the verdict noted that Murphy had declared himself on Depp's side and against Heard, and that one of the dogs was in fact Depp's, but Heard had volunteered to take the blame to ensure that Depp did not get into trouble regarding his employment in Australia.

Depp also claimed that Heard's allegations had escalated since her filing for a temporary restraining order (TRO) in 2016. The court countered that Heard had in fact been clear already in the TRO application that the violence had been constant throughout their relationship, and found it credible that she had been advised by her lawyer to only mention the most recent incidents. Depp further alleged that Heard meeting with him after the TRO was a sign that she was not a victim of domestic violence, but the court found that it is not unusual for a victim of domestic abuse to have contradictory feelings towards their abuser.

Finally, Depp claimed that Heard had invented the term 'the monster' and that it had not been used to describe his conduct while under the influence of alcohol or drugs. Instead, the judge found that Depp himself had used this term in various discussions to refer to his problems with substance abuse and anger management.

=== Heard's admission to self-defence ===
In her witness statement, Heard maintained that while Depp had always been the aggressor, she had once hit him back (incident #9) and had "sometimes throw[n] pots and pans at Mr Depp but only to try and escape him and as a means of self-defence". In contrast, Depp claimed that Heard had been the aggressor, and that audio records of private discussions between him and Heard proved it. In these tapes, Heard appeared to admit to having hit him and thrown items at him. Both parties agreed that the word 'fight' as used in the tapes had been used to refer to arguments, not simply to physical fights. The court found that the weight of the tapes was reduced by them being clearly "acrimonious" and "emotional" private discussions during which there was no one to ask for clarification for whether something was to be taken literally or sarcastically, and because they could not be directly linked to any of the incidents presented in the trial. In sum, even if taken to prove that Heard had been the aggressor, the tapes would not have changed the ruling on the 14 incidents presented at the trial by NGN.

The court also found that neither Depp nor Heard's alleged previous acts of violence outside their relationship were relevant to the case and concluded that neither had any previous convictions for violence.

=== Verdict on alleged violent incidents (perpetrated by Depp) ===
For incident #1, the court found Heard's account of the events to be more likely, although observing that "seen in isolation, the evidence that Mr Depp assaulted Ms Heard on this occasion might not be sufficient. However, taken with the evidence as a whole, I find that it did occur." For incident #2, the court also ruled in NGN's favour, citing contemporaneous communications between Depp, Heard and other parties and Depp's own admissions under cross-examination to substance abuse and jealousy during this time. A photograph which Depp's lawyers claimed to prove that Heard had no injuries could not be proven to have been taken on that day. The court also found incident #3 in NGN's favour based on a witness statement by Heard's friend Kristina Sexton, who had accompanied the couple on the trip, and on evidence of Depp's behaviour related to substance abuse and anger issues in general. The court rejected the further allegations made in closed court.

The court ruled in NGN's favour on incident #4, stating that contemporaneous messages between Depp, Heard and other parties supported Heard's version of the events. Depp also admitted during cross-examination that he did not remember everything that had taken place, which was contrary to his earlier statements. The court ruled in favour of the account presented by NGN on incidents #5 and #7, but for incident #6, the court did not find that any physical violence had taken place as NGN could not provide more specific information on the incident except a contemporaneous text message from Depp, in which he apologised to Heard for his behaviour.

For incident #8, which took place over three days in Australia, the court found in favour of NGN's account. Heard's statement of the events—that Depp assaulted her multiple times after relapsing on illegal drugs and alcohol—was found to be supported by photographs and a mobile phone recording made by Depp's staff in the aftermath of the incident, and witness statements and evidence from Whitney Henriquez, Raquel Pennington, Erin Boerum, Ben King, Depp's late bodyguard Jerry Judge, and Heard's therapist, Dr. Connell Cowan. Depp's relapse was proved by an exchange of messages between him and his assistant Nathan Holmes, and the fact that Depp's doctor treating him for his addiction disorder resigned after the incident, citing his patient's unwillingness to commit to sobriety. The court did not accept Depp's claim that Heard had caused the injury to his finger. The court accepted the further claims Heard made about the incident in closed court. Although in general ruling in her favour and that the incident must have been scary, Heard's description of the events as comparable to a hostage situation was taken to be hyperbolic.

On incident #9, the court found in favour of NGN's account that Depp had attacked Heard and her sister, and accepted that Heard had acted violently only in defence of her sister. The court did not accept Depp's allegation that he had not been violent and that his bodyguard, Travis McGivern, had witnessed Heard throw items at him. The court found McGivern's account to be in contradiction with that given by the only independent witness at the scene, Depp's nurse Debbie Lloyd, who stated that both Depp and Heard were violent during that event, but did not note any items thrown. Furthermore, McGivern could not explain why he had changed his account significantly between his witness statement and his cross-examination in court, which reduced the weight that could be given to his statements.

The court ruled in NGN's favour on incident #10, but did not do so for incident #11, because Depp had not been cross-examined on it. For incident #12, the court found that the evidence was in favour of NGN. When cross-examined about the incident, Depp admitted that he had headbutted Heard, but claimed it had been an accident, which contradicted an earlier statement he had made on tape in 2016. Other evidence supporting Heard's version of the events were photographs of her injuries taken on the day of the assault, her consultations with three nurses on her injuries, as well as her contemporaneous communications with her publicist, agent and therapist. Statements given by her friends Raquel Pennington and Melanie Inglessis on witnessing her injuries on the day of the assault were also found to be credible. Inglessis was Heard's make-up artist for The Late Late Show, which took place the day after the incident, and testified that she had hidden the injuries to Heard's face with make-up, and that stylist Samantha McMillen did not see Heard before that. The court did not accept Depp's claim that Heard assaulted him and then staged the scene to look like she had been the victim. To support his allegations, Depp used a photograph of his face taken by his staff member Sean Bett, but the court did not find it to show the alleged injuries, other than a minor scratch.

For incident #13, the court again ruled in favour of NGN's account. They did not accept Depp's claim that Heard had hit him, as the metadata of the photograph that Sean Bett claimed was taken of the injuries to Depp's face immediately after the incident was found to have been taken in March 2015, during the aftermath of Incident #9 where Heard had admitted to punching him to defend her sister. Bett could not explain this discrepancy, which reduced the weight of his statement.

Finally, for incident #14, the court ruled in favour of NGN, citing several credible contemporaneous witness statements and photographs of Heard's injuries. The statements made by the LAPD officers who attended the scene were not found to be unambiguous. Furthermore, the officers had significantly overestimated the time they spent on the scene, with the timestamps on the building's CCTV system demonstrating that they spent only 15 minutes there, instead of the about 30–60 minutes claimed by Officer Saenz. The court also found that the statements given by Depp's staff were not as credible given their reliance on him for employment, and that it was most likely that the building staff had not seen injuries on Heard as she wore make-up when out in public.

== Appeal ==
Depp appealed the judgment, but his appeal was denied on 25 November 2020, with Mr. Justice Nicol arguing that it had "no realistic prospect of success", although he allowed Depp to appeal directly to the Court of Appeal. In a hearing at the Court of Appeal on 18 March 2021, Depp's lawyers stated that they had learned after the trial that Heard had not donated her divorce settlement to charity. They argued that the judge had been "subliminally influenced" by the donation to find in NGN's favour, citing a statement in the ruling in which the judge rejected Depp's characterisation of Heard as a gold-digger. They also argued that the judge had "unfairly rejected evidence unfavourable to Heard" in the trial, in reference to the tapes in which she admitted to having hit Depp.

In response, NGN's lawyers stated that the donation had nothing to do with the subject of the trial, and did not change its outcome. They also argued that Heard had pledged to donate the sum within ten years, not in one lump sum. As for the tapes, NGN's lawyers stated that they only presented "bickering between two people who were in the final stages of a relationship" and that "the position if the judge had found – because Mr Depp's case was that 'she hit me more than once' – she was feisty and had slapped Mr Depp as she admitted on that tape, that does not disqualify her from being a victim of serious domestic violence."

On 25 March 2021, the Court of Appeal rejected Depp's application to overturn the verdict. The court stated that they did not

accept that there is any ground for believing that the judge may have been influenced by any such general perception as [Depp's lawyer] relies on. In the first place, he does not refer to [Heard's] charitable donation at all in the context of his central findings. On the contrary, he only mentions it in a very particular context … and after he had already reached his conclusions in relation to the 14 incidents ... we conclude that the appeal has no real prospect of success.

In their judgment, Lord Justice Underhill and Lord Justice Dingemans found that Depp had received a "full and fair" trial, and that Mr. Justice Nicol "gave thorough reasons for his conclusions which have not been shown even arguably to be vitiated by any error of approach or mistake of law". Mr. Justice Nicol had not made his judgment based on Heard's witness statement, but by considering the evidence related to each incident separately. The Court of Appeal rejected the claim that this was a "he said – she said" case, instead finding that the judgment had been based mainly on evidence such as contemporaneous text and email messages, medical records and photographs, instead of statements by Depp or Heard. They also rejected Depp's claim that Mr. Justice Nicol had been uncritical of Heard's statements, pointing out that he had on several instances been critical of her, and that he had not made any of the judgments based on her witness statement alone.

The Court of Appeal also found that Depp had admitted in court that he had head-butted Heard, "frequently took quantities of illegal drugs and drank excessively", and that "there are several instances of Mr Depp acknowledging in contemporaneous texts, either to Ms Heard or to third parties, that he had been out of control through drink and drugs and had behaved very badly". Therefore "The Judge found, with considerable support from the contemporaneous evidence, that when under the influence of drink and drugs he was liable to moods of extreme anger and jealousy and could behave highly destructively." Although this alone could not prove that he had been violent towards Heard, it did make her account of the events more likely.

== Reactions to the verdict ==
=== Statements by Depp, NGN, Heard and Wootton ===
Following the verdict, NGN issued a statement saying: "The Sun has stood up and campaigned for the victims of domestic abuse for over 20 years. Domestic abuse victims must never be silenced, and we thank the judge for his careful consideration and thank Amber Heard for her courage in giving evidence to the court." Heard's lawyer, Elaine Charlson Bredehof, who represented her in the related defamation case in the US, stated that "For those of us present for the London High Court trial, this decision and judgment are not a surprise. Very soon, we will be presenting even more voluminous evidence in the US. We are committed to obtaining justice for Amber Heard in the US court and defending Ms Heard’s right to free speech."

Schillings LLP, who represented Depp in the case, gave the following public statement: "Most troubling is the judge's reliance on the testimony of Amber Heard, and corresponding disregard of the mountain of counter-evidence from police officers, medical practitioners, her own former assistant, other unchallenged witnesses and an array of documentary evidence which completely undermined the allegations, point by point. All of this was overlooked. The judgment is so flawed that it would be ridiculous for Mr Depp not to appeal this decision." Four days after the verdict, Depp stepped down from his role as Gellert Grindelwald in the Fantastic Beasts film series at the request of Warner Bros., its production company. He was subsequently replaced with Mads Mikkelsen.

Dan Wootton later apologized to both Depp and Heard for having gotten involved in the "carnival of commentary" surrounding the breakdown of their relationship. Among other things, he stated that he was "sorry to both Johnny and Amber for contributing to their heartache" and expressed regret for having interfered in their affairs. Wootton's apology came after he himself faced allegations—for which he was later cleared—that he had been using a pseudonym and money to solicit sexual images from his colleagues.

=== Domestic violence activists and legal experts ===
Several UK-based domestic violence charities and legal experts gave statements that found the verdict to be a positive outcome for victims of domestic violence and for free speech. Lisa King of Refuge said, "This is an important ruling and one which we hope sends a very powerful message: every single survivor of domestic abuse should be listened to and should be heard. ... What we have seen today is that power, fame and financial resources cannot be used to silence women. That is a welcome message for survivors of domestic abuse around the world. We stand in solidarity with Amber Heard, who has shown immense bravery in speaking up and speaking out". Harriet Wistrich, the founder of the Centre for Women's Justice, stated that "So many women who have tried to speak out or share their experiences are being threatened with libel actions. This is a really helpful judgment and will serve as a warning to men who think they can silence those who speak out about their abuse." Sarah Harding, a partner specialising in family law at Hodge Jones & Allen, said: "It is hoped that this case will encourage other victims of domestic violence to come forward and seek the protection that they need. In addition to the Me Too movement and the domestic abuse bill ... this case will highlight that the courts do listen, regardless of wealth or stature." Caroline Kean, a partner at the London law firm Wiggin LLP, called the verdict "a heartening and just decision which serves as a reminder that British libel laws are not there to curtail free speech and the media's right to publish on stories of global interest."

Commentators also stated that Heard had been mistreated by the media for not being regarded as the "perfect victim". Helena Kennedy QC stated that "Battered women have to [seem] meek and subservient to have our sympathy. I have represented women who have put up with this but when they do resist they somehow [are deemed to] lose their right to [compassion]. There's no doubt that Amber Heard did ... resist but that does not make her certifiable." She also stated that Heard had been the target of death threats and misogynistic online attacks throughout the hearing. Labour MP Jess Phillips claimed that Heard had been subject to "character assassination" in the media, stating that "abused women are not all one type of perfect picture of victimhood who would incite sympathy from everyone they met." This was echoed by Nicki Norman, acting chief executive at Women's Aid, who said: "The allegations of domestic abuse against Johnny Depp were extremely serious. Everyone who has experienced domestic abuse deserves to be listened to and believed. This also applies to survivors who do not fit the image of the 'perfect' victim – and regardless of the high profile of the alleged abuser. There is no excuse for domestic abuse." Jennifer O'Connell of The Irish Times wrote that "Among those who will suffer as a result of the whole, ugly episode are the victims of domestic abuse who cannot have been encouraged to come forward by the trial or the public reaction to Heard. She may ultimately have been believed by the judge, but in the court of public opinion, she never stood a chance."

=== Media ===
Media deemed the trial to be damaging to both Depp and Heard even prior to its beginning. Following the verdict, PR Agent Mark Borkowski stated that the trial had brought the claims made by Heard to the attention of an even wider audience and that it was "one of the biggest showbiz fails for a long time". PR manager Mark Stephens commented that pursuing the case had been "another example of [Depp's] self-destruction" and that "the way this case was run is a matter of enormous consternation because Amber Heard was tried against all of the tropes that he used against women ... The way in which [Heard] was secondarily abused in the courtroom is an issue which will be studied for years to come." Tatiana Siegel of The Hollywood Reporter stated that the trial was simply "the punctuation" to Depp's "self-made implosion" over the past four years, and that he was now considered a persona non grata in Hollywood.

=== Online petitions ===
Following the verdict, an online petition to bring back Depp in his role as Captain Jack Sparrow to the Pirates of the Caribbean franchise resurfaced, receiving over 300,000 signatures. Jessica Rawden of Cinema Blend stated that the petition was unviable as a new film in the series would be less financially viable even without the controversy surrounding Depp. Another petition for Depp to return in Fantastic Beasts: The Secrets of Dumbledore received over 150,000 signatures. Ultimately, a petition to remove Heard from the upcoming Aquaman sequel received over 4.5 million signatures. Heard condemned the petition and called it a "paid campaign". In an interview with Entertainment Weekly, she stated, "Paid rumours and paid campaigns on social media don't dictate [casting decisions] because they have no basis in reality. Only the fans actually made Aquaman and Aquaman 2 happen. I’m excited to get started next year".

== See also ==
- Depp v. Heard – subsequent case held in Virginia in 2022
