= Ferdinand v MGN Ltd =

2011 High Court case

Ferdinand v Mirror Group Newspapers
- Court: High Court of Justice (Queen's Bench Division)
- Decided: 29 September 2011
- Citation: [2011] EWHC 2454 QB

Court membership
- Judge sitting: The Hon. Mr. Justice Nicol

Ferdinand v Mirror Group Newspapers is a 2011 High Court case in which the English footballer Rio Ferdinand was unsuccessful in preventing the publication of a tabloid newspaper story revealing details of an alleged sexual relationship.

== Background ==
On 25 April 2010, the Sunday Mirror ran an article entitled "My Affair with England Captain Rio", in which interior designer Carly Storey gave an account of an alleged relationship with Rio Ferdinand. Ferdinand described the article as "gross invasion of my privacy" and brought legal action in which he sought damages and a worldwide injunction against further publication. Ferdinand said that he had not met Ms. Storey for six years at the time of publication of the Sunday Mirror article, and had exchanged text messages with her between that time and his appointment as captain of the England national football team in February 2010. He claimed that there had been a misuse of private information.

Ms. Storey received a payment of £16,000 for her interview with the Sunday Mirror, which had been sold to the newspaper after she had contacted the publicist Max Clifford. Lawyers acting for Mirror Group Newspapers argued that he had been appointed as captain of the England football team on the basis that he was a "reformed and responsible" character. The case centred on whether the Sunday Mirror had a public interest defence based on Article 10 of the European Convention on Human Rights, which guarantees the right to freedom of expression, or whether Ferdinand was entitled to privacy in accordance with Article 8 of the European Convention on Human Rights, which guarantees the right to respect for private and family life

On 29 September 2011, Mr. Justice Nicol ruled in favour of the defendant, Mirror Group Newspapers, saying: "Overall, in my judgment, the balancing exercise favours the defendant's right of freedom of expression over the claimant's right of privacy."

Lawyers acting for Ferdinand issued a statement saying that he was "extremely disappointed" with the decision, and announced an intention to appeal. Costs in the case were estimated at around £500,000. Tina Weaver, the editor of the Sunday Mirror, commented: "There has never been greater scrutiny of the media than now, and we applaud this ruling in recognising the important role a free press has to play in a democratic society."

Media commentators described the victory of the Sunday Mirror in the case as significant in the wake of the News International phone hacking scandal and the 2011 British privacy injunctions controversy.

== See also ==
- CTB v News Group Newspapers
- Human Rights Act 1998
- Misuse of private information in English law
- Privacy in English law
