= Camilla Palmer =

Employment mediator and solicitor

Camilla Palmer is a solicitor specialising in employment law and was appointed a Queen's Counsel in 2015. She founded the legal partnership Palmer Wade, the Women's Equality Network forum, and the charity Your Employment Settlement Service (YESS), which arbitrates and negotiates employment disputes.

== Legal career ==
She started her career as the secretary for Henry Hodge at the Child Poverty Action Group. She subsequently worked at Gingerbread advising single parents and then took a law degree at the London School of Economics where she focused upon social justice, studying the legal aspects of sex discrimination. She then worked for a variety of legal employers, including Bindmans LLP, before setting up her own partnership, Palmer Wade, with Joanna Wade in 2002.

In 2009, she joined the firm Leigh Day, where she led their employment team, and represented the high-profile client Miriam O'Reilly at an employment tribunal in 2011, when O'Reilly sued the BBC for unfair dismissal on the grounds of ageism. The case was won but O'Reilly left the BBC a year later and founded the Women's Equality Network with Palmer – a forum for women facing similar discrimination.

In 2014, Palmer started the charity Your Employment Settlement Service (YESS) which aims to provide legal advice to employers and employees so that they can resolve disputes economically without the expense of litigation.

In 2023, she joined an employment mediation team based in Doughty Street Chambers.

== Personal life ==
She was married to Sir Andrew Nicol, a High Court judge, until his death in 2026; they have two sons. Her pastimes include tennis and walking.

== Publications ==
- Sex and Race Discrimination in Employment (1987)
- Discrimination at Work: The Law on Sex, Race and Disability Discrimination (1997)
- Discrimination Law Handbook (2007)
