= Andrew Nicol (judge) =

British judge (1951–2026)

Sir Andrew Nicol
- Royal coat of arms of the United Kingdom

Justice of the High Court
- In office 2009–2021

Personal details
- Born: 9 May 1951 Ashtead, Surrey, England
- Died: 22 August 2026 (aged 75)
- Spouse: Camilla Palmer
- Children: 2
- Education: Selwyn College, Cambridge; Harvard Law School; Middle Temple

Sir Andrew George Lindsay Nicol (9 May 1951 – 22 August 2026) was a judge of the High Court of England and Wales.

== Background ==
Nicol was born in Ashtead, Surrey, England on 9 May 1951. He was educated at City of London Freemen's School, Selwyn College, Cambridge, and Harvard Law School (LLM). He was called to the bar at Middle Temple in 1978 and became a bencher there in 2004. He was made a QC in 1995, deputy judge of the High Court from 2003 to 2009, and judge of the High Court of Justice (Queen's Bench Division) since 2009. He co-wrote Media Law with Geoffrey Robertson, where they said, "Trials derive their legitimacy from being conducted in public; the judge presides as a surrogate for the people, who are entitled to see and approve the power exercised on their behalf. Those who assist the prosecution can and should be protected by other means. No matter how fair, justice must still be seen before it can be said to be done."

== Controversial cases ==
=== David Sellu ===
Nicol was the judge in the trial of consultant surgeon David Sellu in November 2013. Sellu was found guilty of gross negligence manslaughter following the death of a patient under his care, and served 15 months imprisonment of a 30-month sentence. After release, Sellu's appeal against the conviction was successful in 2016. The successful grounds for the appeal were that Nicol had failed to instruct the jury properly regarding the gross negligence element of the offence.

=== Johnny Depp/The Sun ===
Nicol presided over the 2020 libel suit Depp v News Group Newspapers Ltd, in which Johnny Depp sued British tabloid newspaper The Sun, which had claimed in an article that Depp was a "wife beater". Nicol ruled against Depp, accepting that 12 of 14 alleged accounts of violence committed by Depp against Amber Heard were true. Depp was denied permission to appeal by two judges of the Court of Appeal, who stated that they did not believe there was a real prospect of overturning the findings, and that the hearings had been fair.

== Personal life and death ==
Nicol was married to Camilla Palmer; they had two sons, Robert and Jamie. He died on 22 August 2026, aged 75.

== See also ==
- Ferdinand v MGN Ltd
- R v Incedal
- Depp v News Group Newspapers Ltd
- Death of Keith Blakelock
- Murder of Tia Sharp
