= Prudence MacLeod =

Australian and British business executive (born 1958)

- Born: Prudence Murdoch; August 1958 (age 67); Adelaide, South Australia, Australia
- Citizenship: Australia
- Education: Dalton School
- Occupations: Non-executive director; Tabloid researcher and journalist
- Board member of: Times Newspapers Ltd (2010–2022)
- Spouses: Crispin Odey (m. 1985; div. 1986); Alasdair MacLeod (m. 1989)
- Children: 3
- Father: Rupert Murdoch
- Relatives: Elisabeth Murdoch (half-sister); Lachlan Murdoch (half-brother); James Murdoch (half-brother)
- Family: Murdoch

Prudence MacLeod (née Murdoch; born August 1958) is an Australian and British philanthropist and business executive in the media industry. She is the eldest child and daughter of Australian billionaire media proprietor Rupert Murdoch. She held a non-executive directorial role on the board of Times Newspapers Ltd, a subsidiary of her father's News Corporation, from 2011 to 2022.

MacLeod is the co-founder of the Macdoch Foundation, which funds projects focused on improving the natural environment, mitigating the effects of climate change and the health of communities, as well as founding director of other charitable organisations.

As of September 2024, the Murdoch family was involved in a US court case in which Prudence and her half-siblings James and Elisabeth challenged their father's bid to amend the family trust to ensure that his eldest son, Lachlan, retained control of News Corporation and Fox Corporation, rather than benefiting all of his six children, as is specified in the "irrevocable" terms of the trust. As of June 2025, the matter was before the courts.

== Early life and education ==
Murdoch was born in August 1958 in Adelaide, South Australia. She is the eldest child and first daughter of Australian-born American media mogul Rupert Murdoch, and his first wife, Australian model Patricia Booker.

Murdoch was raised in Adelaide until 1968, one year after her parents' divorce, when she moved to London with her father and stepmother Anna Torv after his purchase of the tabloid newspaper publishing company, News of the World. After the divorce, Prudence's mother Patricia Booker married a Swiss national and began to lead a life of partying, often neglecting her daughter as a child. Prudence, although she had wanted to move with her father and new wife, had a poor relationship with her stepmother after her half-siblings (Lachlan, James, and Elisabeth) were born.

She began her secondary education at a state school in London, but did not last a term there. After her family relocated to New York City in 1974, she attended Dalton School in Manhattan, where she did not fit in among "the New York rich kids".

== Career ==
MacLeod returned to London and worked briefly as a tabloid researcher and journalist for News of the World, but since then has not worked for any of her father's businesses.

She was a board member of The Times newspaper in London (owned by News Corp) from 14 December 2010 until her resignation on 3 March 2022. She has not shown as much interest as her three half-siblings Lachlan, James, and Elisabeth, in becoming involved in her father's business interests, but has the same stake in the family trust as they do, along with an equal say in the fate of its voting stock in both News Corp and Fox News after Rupert's death.

== Philanthropy ==
The Lansdowne Foundation was first registered in December 2006, and Prudence MacLeod is a director of the foundation. It awards the PYT Lansdowne Scholarship, as well as the Prudence MacLeod Prize, which funds a six-month studio residency program in London for a graduate of the National Art School (an art school in Sydney).

MacLeod founded the Prudence Trust, a charitable organisation in the UK that provides grants to small organisations that provide support for young people's mental health.

In 2019 she co-founded, with her husband Alasdair MacLeod, the Macdoch Foundation, a philanthropic organisation aiming "to build the resilience of people and the planet". with Alasdair as chair. It funds projects in both Australia and the US focused on improving the natural environment, mitigating the effects of climate change, and the health of communities. In 2023, the Lansdowne Trust is described as "another charity within the Macdoch group".

The MacLeods are benefactors and life governors of the National Gallery of Australia. They donated A$3 million to the NGA to help fund the new Pasifika Gallery, opened in October 2023.

== Personal life ==
=== Relationship with Rupert Murdoch ===
In 1997, MacLeod became very angry with her father after he had referred to his "three children", and had a row with him. He apologised, sending her flowers. In 1999 she gave an interview to The Sydney Morning Herald, which was published under the headline "the forgotten daughter" on the day of her half-brother Lachlan's wedding to Sarah O'Hare, which caused tensions at the family gathering. She expressed several times that she feels like an outsider (compared with her three half-siblings Lachlan, James, and Elisabeth); that they were taller, more sophisticated and glamorous, while she is "the short, fat one". She prefers to remain anonymous. According to Rupert Murdoch biographer Michael Wolff in 2008, Prudence Murdoch was "the only one of his children not directly competing for his business affections", and "the child who is least afraid of him".

MacLeod's mother, then known as Patricia Maeder, died in Adelaide on 16 November 1998, and Rupert Murdoch was photographed standing next to Prudence at the funeral.

=== Marriages ===
In 1985, Murdoch married Crispin Odey, an English financier who would go on to become the highest-earning hedge fund manager in London. The pair were married only briefly, separating within 15 months.

In 1989, she married Alasdair MacLeod, a Scottish businessman who had moved to Sydney aged 23 to work for Citibank and met his wife there. MacLeod began working for his father-in-law that same year, despite his wife's disapproval of him working in the family business, first in London as general manager of Times Newspapers, and later in Sydney as chief executive of Cumberland Newspapers. MacLeod worked for News Corp for 20 years, both in Australia (News Ltd) and elsewhere, but left his position as managing editor of Nationwide News in 2010 as part of an organisational restructure. It was reported that he fell out with Chris Mitchell, editor-in-chief of The Australian.

In 2000 he took on management of his wife's family farm in Australia, and developed an interest in regenerative agriculture. He became executive chairman of MacDoch, a private investment group with offices in Sydney and London with major Australian farming and agricultural technology investments. Macleod is interested in the role of different types of capital in driving climate change solutions. In April 2026 he is supporting independent candidate Michelle Milthorpe in the upcoming by-election in the division of Farrer.

==== Children ====
MacLeod and her husband have three children: James, Angus, and Clementine, who are Rupert Murdoch's eldest grandchildren. In 2015, it was reported that James was co-founder of podcast series Clippet, which provided "short-form audio news, aimed at on-the-go 18-28 year olds".

=== Residence ===
She holds Australian citizenship, and as of 2024 lives in Sydney with her husband.

In 2014 the MacLeods bought a house in Woollahra, Sydney, originally owned by radio presenter John Laws, for A$10.65 million. They tried and failed to sell the property when Prudence relocated to London in 2020, but sold it three years later for A$17.5 million. They also own country properties in Australia, including: Prudence's residence at the family's Cavan station, near Yass; and Alasdair's farm in New England called Wilmot; Paradise Creek Station at Inverell; Woodburn, north of Walcha; and Morocco, near Gunnedah.

=== Family trust dispute ===
In September 2024, the Murdoch family is involved in a court case in Reno, Nevada, in which Prudence, James, and Elisabeth are challenging their father's bid to amend the family trust to ensure that his eldest son, Lachlan, retains control of News Corp and Fox Corp, rather than benefiting his four eldest children, as is specified in the "irrevocable" terms of the trust set up during the divorce from Anna Murdoch (second wife). According to The New York Times, Murdoch Snr wants his companies to remain politically conservative, and sees his other children as too politically liberal.

The irrevocable family trust was set up after Rupert and Anna Murdoch's divorce in 1999, to hold the family's 28.5% stake in News Corp. It relates only to the children born before then, giving them equal say in the fate of the business after Rupert's death. Chloe and Grace Murdoch, Rupert's children with third wife Wendi Deng, will have no say in the business, although will share the stock proceeds. The case follows Rupert's attempt to change the trust in 2023, and the Nevada probate commissioner's finding that he was allowed to amend the trust "if he is able to show he is acting in good faith and for the sole benefit of his heirs". Rupert Murdoch is arguing interference by the other siblings would cause a financial loss to Fox, and therefore "in their own best interests if they have their votes taken away from them". He argues that preserving the outlet's conservative editorial stance against interference by the more politically moderate siblings would better protect its commercial value.

The case has led to the three children becoming estranged from their father, with none of them attending his wedding to his fifth wife, Elena Zhukova, in June 2024.

=== Net worth ===
Year	Financial Review Rich List		Forbes Australia's 50 Richest	
Year	Rank	Net worth (A$)	Rank	Net worth (US$)
2017	−	not listed	−	not listed
2018	−	not listed	−	not listed
2019	22 ▲	$3.10 billion ▲	−	not listed
2020	66 ▼	$2.24 billion ▼	−	not listed
2021	32 ▲	$2.80 billion ▲		
2022	44 ▼	$2.60 billion ▼		
2023	45 ▼	$2.57 billion ▼		
2024	42 ▲	$3.19 billion ▲		
2025	44 ▼	$3.50 billion ▲		

Legend
Icon	Description
Steady	Has not changed from the previous year
▲	Has increased from the previous year
▼	Has decreased from the previous year

== See also ==
- The Rise of the Murdoch Dynasty
