= The TV Festival =

Annual media event in the United Kingdom

- Genre: Television
- Dates: 31 August - 3 September 2027
- Location: Manchester
- Country: England
- Years active: 1976–present
- Founded: 1976
- Website: www.thetvfestival.com

The TV Festival (formerly the Edinburgh TV Festival) is an annual media event held in Manchester, England, each August that brings together delegates from the television and digital world to debate the major issues facing the industry.

The Festival draws over 2,000 delegates from across the global TV industry. Although the festival is held in Manchester, the organisations headquarters are based in London, England.

== History and outline ==
Over the years, the Festival has attracted industry figures including Rupert Murdoch, Ted Turner, Vince Gilligan, Ted Sarandos, Elisabeth Murdoch, Louis Theroux, Michaela Coel, David Attenborough, Charlie Brooker, David Olusoga and Steve Coogan as well as people distinguished in their fields such as Al Gore and Eric Schmidt.

Established in 1976, as the Edinburgh International Television Festival it took place every August in the week leading up to the bank holiday at the Edinburgh International Conference Centre at the same time as the Edinburgh Fringe, and similar events, in the city. The Edinburgh International Television Festival is programmed by and for the television industry, by a rotating advisory committee headed by a new chair every year. The Festival is wholly owned by a not-for-profit charity, known publicly as The TV Foundation and is governed by its own board of directors.

The TV Foundation runs a suite of free-to-access creative development initiatives: "The Network" (formerly known as TVYP) which gives new entrants a first step into the TV industry, while "Visionaries" (formerly known as Ones to Watch) supports those at mid-career. Both benefit from fully funded places at the Festival, which include tailored workshops, masterclasses and networking. Year-round mentoring, training and events are also offered.

The Festival runs other events throughout the year. Launched in 2018 these include AHTV and The New Voice Awards which support emerging talent and self-starting creatives in TV and digital.

=== Relocation to Manchester ===
On 23 June 2026, it was announced that the festival would leave Edinburgh after 50 years and relocate to Manchester in 2027. Festival organisers explained the move due to "increasing challenges around accessibility, affordability and sustainability".

The 2026 festival, held from 25 to 28 August, was the final edition to take place in Edinburgh before the festival's planned relocation to Manchester in 2027.

== The MacTaggart Lecture ==
The festival has become associated with its keynote address, the James MacTaggart Memorial Lecture. The lecture features speeches from leading media figures connected with British and international television over more than 40 years.

Year	Speaker	Job title*
1976	John McGrath	Dramatist and director, founder of 7:84 Theatre Company
1977	Marcel Ophuls	French/US documentary film maker (The Sorrow and the Pity/Le Chagrin et la Pitié)
1978	Norman Lear	American television producer and scriptwriter
1979	Jeremy Isaacs	former Director of Programmes for Thames Television (later Chief Executive, Channel 4)
1980	John Mortimer	Screenwriter and dramatist
1981	Peter Jay	Economist and broadcaster, Chairman of TV-am
1982	Ted Turner	American television executive, founder of CNN
1983	Jonathan Miller	Stage and television director/producer and broadcaster
1984	Denis Forman	Chairman, Granada Television
1985	John Schlesinger	Film and television director
1986	Troy Kennedy Martin	Television dramatist
1987	Phillip Whitehead	Television documentary producer
1988	Christine Ockrent	Belgian/French journalist and broadcaster
1989	Rupert Murdoch	Australian/American Chief Executive Officer and Chairman, News Corporation
1990	Verity Lambert	Independent film and television producer
1991	David Elstein	Director of programmes, Thames Television
1992	Michael Grade	Chief executive, Channel 4
1993	Dennis Potter	Television dramatist and screenwriter
1994	Greg Dyke	Chief executive of LWT, Chairman of ITV Council and GMTV
1995	Janet Street-Porter	Broadcaster and journalist
1996	John Birt	Director general, BBC
1997	Laurence Marks and Maurice Gran	Television comedy scriptwriters and programme creators
1998	Peter Bazalgette	Managing director, Bazal
1999	Richard Eyre	Chief executive, ITV Network
2000	Greg Dyke	Director general, BBC
2001	David Liddiment	Director of channels, ITV Network
2002	Mark Thompson	Chief executive, Channel 4
2003	Tony Ball	Chief executive, BSkyB
2004	John Humphrys	Broadcaster and journalist
2005	Lord Birt	Former director general, BBC
2006	Charles Allen	Chief executive, ITV
2007	Jeremy Paxman	Broadcaster and presenter of Newsnight (BBC)
2008	Peter Fincham	Director of Television, ITV
2009	James Murdoch	Chairman and chief executive, Europe and Asia, News Corporation
2010	Mark Thompson	Director general, BBC
2011	Eric Schmidt	US citizen, executive chairman, Google
2012	Elisabeth Murdoch	Chairman, Shine Group
2013	Kevin Spacey	American actor, director and producer
2014	David Abraham	Chief executive, Channel 4
2015	Armando Iannucci	Broadcaster, writer, director and producer
2016	Shane Smith	Canadian journalist and chief executive of Vice Media
2017	Jon Snow	Journalist and broadcaster
2018	Michaela Coel	Actress and writer
2019	Dorothy Byrne	Head of News and Current Affairs, Channel 4
2020	David Olusoga	Historian and broadcaster
2021	Jack Thorne	Screenwriter and playwright
2022	Emily Maitlis	Journalist and broadcaster
2023	Louis Theroux	Journalist, broadcaster and author
2024	James Graham	Playwright and dramatist
2025	James Harding	Journalist and editor

* All job titles as at the time the lecture was given. Nationality/citizenship is British unless stated otherwise.

== See also ==
- List of television festivals
