= Lachlan Murdoch =

Australian-American businessman (born 1971)

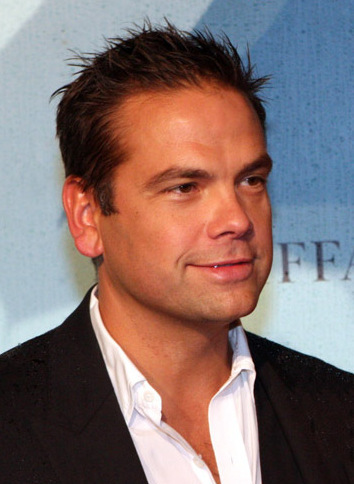
- Murdoch in 2013
- Born: Lachlan Keith Murdoch; 8 September 1971 (age 55); London, England
- Education: Princeton University (BA)
- Occupations: Executive chairman, Nova Entertainment; Executive chairman and CEO, Fox Corporation; Executive chairman, News Corp
- Years active: 1994−present
- Spouse: Sarah O'Hare (m. 1999)
- Children: 3
- Parents: Rupert Murdoch (father); Anna dePeyster (mother)
- Family: Murdoch family

Lachlan Keith Murdoch (born 8 September 1971) is a Australian businessman and mass media heir. He is the son of the media tycoon Rupert Murdoch. He is the executive chairman of Nova Entertainment, chairman of News Corp, executive chairman and CEO of Fox Corporation. In 2025, Murdoch's net worth was estimated at A$3.21 billion, as published in the Financial Review Rich List.

== Early life and education ==
Murdoch was born on 8 September 1971 at Wimbledon Hospital in Wimbledon, London, the eldest son of Australian-born American media mogul Rupert Murdoch, and his second wife, Scottish journalist and author Anna Maria dePeyster (née Torv; formerly Murdoch). He was raised in New York City, where his father owned the New York Post, after moving there with his family at the age of three.

He received his primary and secondary education at the Aspen Country Day School in Aspen, Colorado; then Dalton School and Trinity School in Manhattan, New York City; and then at Phillips Academy in Andover, Massachusetts.

In 1989 he took a gap year, during which he spent three months in Sydney, Australia, doing a menial job for the family business Daily Mirror, while his father was in the city for business.

In 1994, he graduated with a bachelor's degree in philosophy from Princeton University. While at Princeton, he studied philosophy with Béatrice Longuenesse and Alan Hajek. His senior thesis was on Kantian philosophy.

== Career ==
=== News Corp executive (1995–2005) ===
At the age of 22 or 23, Murdoch was appointed general manager of Queensland Newspapers, the publisher of Brisbane's Courier-Mail, and at this time became friends with James Packer, also the son of a media mogul. He became publisher of Australia's first national paper, The Australian, and in 1995, was appointed deputy CEO of News Limited in Australia, and in 1996 was appointed to the News Corporation board. After getting married in 1999, he was in 2000 appointed deputy chief operating officer of News Corp's global print operations, promoted from his previous roles as executive director of News Corp (1996), and senior executive vice-president (1999–2000).

With a personal interest in Australian rugby league, on 30 March 1995 Murdoch was at the first Super League meeting in the Atanaskovic Hartnell offices in Sydney. He and former Brisbane Broncos chief John Ribot signed up leading Canterbury-Bankstown Bulldogs players on documents which were not legally effective. Murdoch was the Broncos' number one ticket holder. This venture lost money.

Encouraged to invest in One.Tel by his friend Australian businessman James Packer, the son of television network owner Kerry Packer, Murdoch was extensively criticised for encouraging News Corporation's multi-hundred million-dollar investment in the start-up telecommunications company in the late 1990s. In April 2014, Murdoch and Packer agreed to an A$40 million settlement over the failure of One.Tel. The settlement was approved by the Supreme Court of New South Wales on 17 April 2014, with A$14.93 million to be paid by the Packer family's Consolidated Press Holdings, A$11.77 million to be paid by Packer's Crown Resorts and A$13.3 million to be paid by News Corp. During this time, Murdoch and his wife lived near his father in New York, and socialised with glamorous people, including expats Baz Luhrmann and Nicole Kidman.

Murdoch led an initial $10.75 million investment, of which only $2.25 million was in cash, in REA Group, and subsequently championed the retention of the investment over the objections of those who wished to sell it. The company later emerged as Australia's market leader in online real estate advertising, known as Realestate.com.au, and in 2014 was assessed as worth more than $3.6 billion to News Corp.

For the year 2001, Murdoch earned a salary of A$2.59 million. During his time at News Corp, Murdoch had oversight of HarperCollins and the company's lines of business in Australia, including REA. He also served on the board of Foxtel and as chairman of Fox Television stations, and was the publisher of the New York Post. While at the New York Post, its circulation grew by over 40 per cent.

In July 2005, the 33-year-old Murdoch abruptly resigned as an executive at the News Corp after a clash with then Fox News head Roger Ailes, with whom his father had sided, and returned to Australia with his wife and son. At the time, aged 34, he was the third most powerful executive in the company. The media empire then included the Twentieth Century Fox movie studio, and included the Fox television network, several satellite broadcasters, and newspapers in the UK, US, and Australia. Roger Ailes, the chairman of Fox News Channel, was named chairman of News Corp's group of television stations to succeed Murdoch junior. Media speculated that his brother, James Murdoch, then chief executive of UK satellite TV company BSkyB, may succeed Rupert Murdoch.

=== Private investments (2005–2014) ===
On leaving News Corp with a two-year non-compete agreement, Murdoch founded an Australian private investment company, Illyria Pty Ltd, in 2005. He developed an eclectic mix of investments, with stakes in the Indian Premier League cricket team Rajasthan Royals, online DVD rental company Quickflix, toy marketer Funtastic and digital media company Destra. On 21 January 2008, Murdoch and James Packer announced that their companies, Illyria and Consolidated Press Holdings would seek to privatise the publicly listed Consolidated Media Holdings. It was expected that the proposed A$3.3 billion deal would deliver Murdoch and Packer with private stakes in Foxtel, Fox Sports, Universal Media Firm and PBL Media, with the latter owning the Nine Network and ACP Magazines. Packer eventually decided to sell down his stake in media companies in a series of transactions between 2006 and 2008, and the deal with Murdoch collapsed.

In November 2009, Illyria acquired 50% of a network of radio network DMG Radio, which was renamed Nova Entertainment, with Murdoch as chairman. In September 2012 Illyria acquired the balance of shares it did not own from the Daily Mail & General Trust. Nova Entertainment grew into the leading network of FM stations in Australia.

In 2010, Packer purchased an 18% stake in Network 10 quickly offloading half to Murdoch. Both Packer and Murdoch joined the Ten board. In February 2011, Murdoch was appointed acting CEO of Ten Network Holdings after the company's board terminated the contract of CEO Grant Blackley. The following month Packer unexpectedly resigned from the board. In February 2012, the Ten board appointed Murdoch non-executive chairman of Ten Network Holdings. Although Ten was already in some financial difficulties before Murdoch became CEO, by late 2012, on paper Illyria had lost A$110 million of the original A$150 million invested since 2010. The share price had fallen by about 80% and network profits had dropped by over half. In an attempt to control costs, Ten had reduced employment numbers by 160 people, and the problems were mainly attributed to falling advertising revenues and restructuring at the network. Ten purchased, at three times its original cost, the Australian rights for MasterChef from the Australian subsidiary of the Shine Group, itself a subsidiary of the News Corp–owned 21st Century Fox. On 14 June 2017, Ten went into voluntary administration after Murdoch and fellow shareholder Bruce Gordon declined to extend the company's credit facility. Two bids were received for Ten; one from Murdoch and Gordon and one from CBS Corporation – Ten's largest creditor. The CBS bid was preferred by both the administrators and creditors. CBS's successful bid meant Murdoch lost his entire investment in the network.

=== Return to News Corp (2014) ===
In March 2014, Murdoch was appointed as non-executive co-chairman of News Corp and 21st Century Fox (one of two companies formed in June 2013 from the old News Corp) in a move that was seen as succession planning for the media empire. This was in the wake of the phone hacking scandal in the UK and his father's divorce from Wendi Deng.

Murdoch stood aside as chairman and a director of Ten Network Holdings at this time.

In June 2015 he was named as executive chairman of 21st Century Fox.

After 21st Century Fox was acquired by Disney in March 2019, Murdoch was named as the chairman and CEO of the Fox Corporation, and was named by his father as heir to his business interests. His father was still hoping "to continue an active role in the company". President Donald Trump met him in 2019.

In 2022, he and his father wanted to merge News Corp and Fox Corporation, but his brother James' opposition, along with that of major shareholders, sunk the proposition the following year.

=== Successor to his father (2023) ===
In September 2023, at the age of 52, when Rupert Murdoch retired, Lachlan Murdoch took over the leadership of his father's group, becoming chair of both Fox Corp and News Corp. In 2023, The Australian Financial Review placed Lachlan Murdoch 33rd on their list of Australia's wealthiest people, with his wealth estimated at A$3.35 billion (US$2.1 billion).

In a July 2024 interview with Paul Kelly of The Australian, Murdoch said:

I believe that if it wasn't for The Australian today, if the policy debate in Australia today was being driven by the ABC, then we would be a totally different country. I think our role is essential both here in Australia but also in Britain and the United States. This is absolutely how I see my leadership mission. It’s also our responsibility as a company and I feel that very strongly.

As of September 2024 Murdoch is executive chair and CEO of Fox Corporation, as well as chair of News Corp and executive chairman of Nova Entertainment, an Australian company.

== Other activities ==
In 2002, Murdoch gave the Andrew Olle Media Lecture.

Murdoch is one of the founding patrons (along with Anthony Pratt, Peter Lowy, and Lisa Fox) of an organisation called "Advance", formerly known as the Young Australian Professionals in America. They held a benefit dinner in November 2005.

== Lawsuits ==
=== Dominion lawsuit (2021–2023) ===
In 2021, Lachlan Murdoch and his father Rupert were the defendants in a $1.6 billion lawsuit, filed by voting machine maker Dominion Voting Systems, for knowingly and maliciously spreading false accusations that Dominion committed election fraud. Fox News Corporation requested that the case be dismissed and on 16 December 2021, the court rejected the request, with the opinion that "Dominion adequately pleaded actual malice by Fox News".

On 6 June 2022, Fox News Corp requested Judge Eric M. Davis drop the lawsuit. In his opinion, Judge Davis denied the request, saying that Dominion had shown enough evidence of actual malice on behalf of Rupert and Lachlan Murdoch of Fox Corporation to allow the case to continue. Documentation obtained by Dominion showed that Lachlan had played "a hands-on role in determining the political thrust of Fox News in favour of Trump". In the end, Fox had to pay $787.5 million in damages in April 2023, and Tucker Carlson was dismissed on 24 April 2023.

=== Crikey (2022–2023) ===
Murdoch sent a series of legal threats to Crikey, an Australian electronic magazine, after political editor Bernard Keane tied the Murdochs to the January 6 United States Capitol attack in a 29 June 2022 article. Crikey originally removed the article to avoid legal persecution but later republished it, with editor Peter Fray accusing Murdoch of "using the law to silence public debate", and "seeking to intimidate us".

On 21 April 2023, Murdoch's lawyers filed a notice to discontinue the case. Murdoch had to pay more than A$800,000 in legal fees to Private Media after abandoning the case.

=== Smartmatic (2022–) ===
In a lawsuit similar to Dominion's, voting machine maker Smartmatic filed a lawsuit implicating both Lachlan Murdoch and his father Rupert for US$2.7 billion on 4 February 2021. Smartmatic claims "Fox News engaged in conspiracy to spread disinformation about Smartmatic. They lied, and did so knowingly and intentionally." In March 2022, Justice David Cohen allowed the removal of several hosts as co-defendants but rejected Fox's motion for dismissal of the suit allowing it to go to the discovery phase. In a second attempt from Fox News to dismiss the lawsuit, Justice Cohen again rejected Fox's request and gave the opinion that Smartmatic had shown a "substantial basis" for their claim that Fox News "showed a reckless disregard for the truth".

As of September 2024, the case continues. In July 2024, Smartmatic subpoenaed four Fox Corporation board members.

=== Family challenge (2024–2025) ===
In September 2024, the Murdoch family is involved in a court case in Reno, Nevada, in which three of Lachlan's siblings (James, his sister Elisabeth and half-sister Prudence MacLeod) are challenging their father's bid to amend the family trust to ensure that Lachlan retains control of News Corp and Fox Corp, rather than benefiting all of his six children, as is specified in the "irrevocable" terms of the trust. According to The New York Times, Murdoch Sr wants his companies to remain politically conservative, and sees his other children as too politically liberal.

The irrevocable family trust was set up after Rupert and Anna Murdoch's divorce in 1999, to hold the family's 28.5% stake in News Corp. It relates only to the children born before then, giving them equal say in the fate of the businesses: each would have one vote in the trust, while their father would have four. Almost all of the family's wealth is in shares controlling 40% of both News Corp and Fox Corp, and is tied up in the trust, which is as of 2024 worth around $US6 billion. The terms of the trust dictate that the four children would continue to have these votes after Rupert's death. Chloe and Grace Murdoch, Rupert's children with third wife Wendi Deng, will have no say in the business, although will share the stock proceeds. The case follows Rupert's attempt to change the trust in October 2023 (which he dubbed "Project Harmony"), revealed to his offspring in December of that year, and the Nevada probate commissioner's finding that he was allowed to amend the trust "if he is able to show he is acting in good faith and for the sole benefit of his heirs". According to the Wall Street Journal in September 2024, James had made an attempt at settlement, in a proposal that included the possible sale of his and his sisters' interests in the trust. However, this would lead to a loosening of the hold of Lachlan and Rupert on the companies, as they would be under financial strain. Rupert's argument in the court is that interference by the other siblings would cause a financial loss to Fox, and therefore "in their own best interests if they have their votes taken away from them". He argues that preserving the outlet's conservative editorial stance against interference by the more politically moderate siblings would better protect its commercial value. The court proceedings are being held in secret, although some details surround the case have leaked out.

The case has led to the three children becoming estranged from their father, with none of them attending his wedding to his fifth wife, Elena Zhukova, in June 2024.

In September 2025, it was announced that the succession challenge had ended and that Lachlan had secured control of the family’s media empire until at least 2050.

== Personal life ==
Apart from full siblings Elisabeth and James Murdoch, Lachlan has three half-siblings, an elder half-sister Prudence, and two younger sisters by his father's third marriage, Grace and Chloe. In later years, tensions between the two brothers have been reported.

He holds Australian citizenship and has often stated that he sees himself as Australian and his home is in Australia. Like his brother James, as he was born in the UK before 1983, he is likely automatically a British citizen otherwise than by descent as well, though he may not have opted to exercise that citizenship. He does not have as strong ties to the UK as his father and siblings, not having spent a lot of time there. Having lived and worked for extended periods in the US and acquired an American accent, it is often assumed that he is American, but he said in a 2001 interview that he considers himself Australian and wishes he could lose the accent.

Murdoch married British-born Australian model/actress Sarah O'Hare in 1999. The couple have two sons; and one daughter.

The Murdochs owned "Berthong", a house in Elizabeth Bay, Sydney, until it was sold to Russell Crowe in 2003. In November 2009, Murdoch purchased "Le Manoir", a 4,097-square-metre (44,100 sq ft) mansion in Bellevue Hill for $23 million; and purchased an adjoining 1,049-square-metre (11,290 sq ft) property two years later. In 2017, Murdoch and his wife paid US$29 million for a large equestrian property in Aspen, Colorado, that contains a 1,250-square-metre (13,500 sq ft) six-bedroom home. In 2019, they purchased the Chartwell Estate in Los Angeles for an estimated US$150 million.

As of 2023 Murdoch owns homes in Sydney, Aspen, and Los Angeles. His wife and children have lived in Sydney since 2021, and Lachlan splits his time between there, Los Angeles (location of Fox Corp. HQ), and New York City, where News Corp is headquartered.

=== Political views ===
In 2018, Lachlan described his political views as "conservative economically and more liberal on social policy".

In February 2023, Lachlan and his wife Sarah Murdoch gave a $1 million donation to a queer museum in Sydney called Qtopia. Protesters at the museum's opening accused the Murdochs of pinkwashing. That September, The Guardian wrote that while observers generally regard Lachlan as more conservative than his siblings, he did not support Trump's presidency. Nonetheless, it noted that he defended Tucker Carlson after he claimed that immigrants made America "dirtier."

=== Ancestry ===
Ancestors of Lachlan Murdoch

8. Patrick John Murdoch
4. Sir Keith Murdoch
9. Annie Brown
2. Keith Rupert Murdoch
10. Rupert Greene
5. Dame Elisabeth Murdoch
11. Marie Grace de Lancey Forth
1. Lachlan Keith Murdoch
12. Jaan Tõrv
6. Jacob Tõrv
13. Anna Tõnisson
3. Anna Torv
7. Sylvia Braida

== Recognition and in the media ==
In June 2005, Murdoch received the Press & Outdoor Advertising "media person of the year" award in Cannes.

In September 2024, the ABC aired a three-part documentary for their Australian Story program entitled: "Making Lachlan Murdoch". Murdoch did not participate in its production, which was made by journalist Paddy Manning and introduced by veteran ABC journalist Leigh Sales, but it does feature a 2001 interview with him, and his billionaire friend James Packer is interviewed. The style of the documentary has no voice-overs, allowing the people featured to talk in their own voices.

The opening episode, "Blood" focuses on his father, Rupert, and grandfather Sir Keith Murdoch. The second episode is called "Money". The series is also aired on YouTube.

== Net worth ==
Year	Financial Review Rich List		Forbes Australia's 50 Richest	
Year	Rank	Net worth (A$)	Rank	Net worth (US$)
2018	n/a	unlisted	n/a	unlisted
2019	18 ▲	$3.62 billion ▲	n/a	unlisted
2020	22 ▼	$3.76 billion ▲		
2021	22	$4.43 billion ▲		
2022	28 ▼	$4.00 billion ▼		
2023	33 ▼	$3.35 billion ▼		
2024	35 ▼	$3.75 billion ▲		
2025	47 ▼	$3.21 billion ▼		

Legend
Icon	Description
Steady	Has not changed from the previous year
▲	Has increased from the previous year
▼	Has decreased from the previous year
