= James Murdoch =

American and British businessman (born 1972)

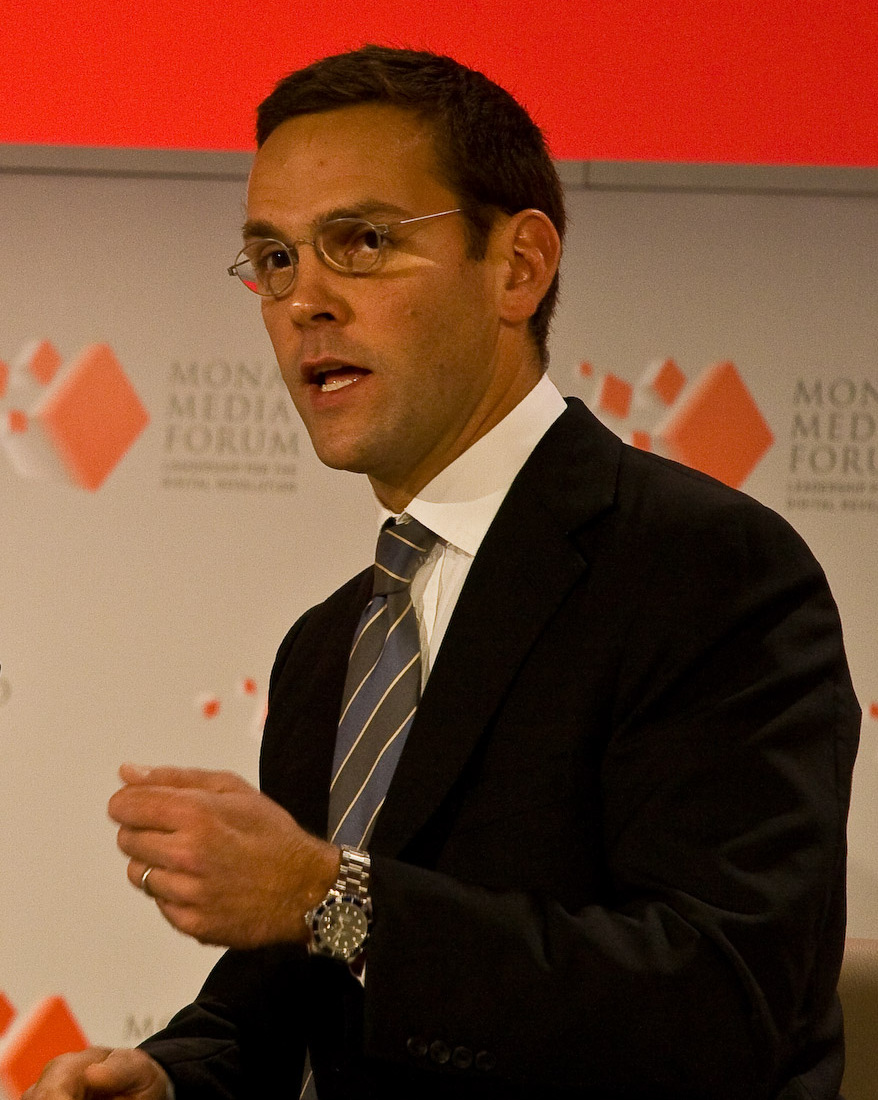
- Murdoch in 2008
- Born: James Rupert Jacob Murdoch; 13 December 1972 (age 53); London, England, UK
- Citizenship: United Kingdom; United States
- Education: Harvard University (attended)
- Board member of: Tesla, Inc.
- Spouse: Kathryn Hufschmid (m. 2000)
- Children: 3
- Parents: Rupert Murdoch (father); Anna dePeyster (née Torv) (mother)
- Family: Murdoch

James Rupert Jacob Murdoch (born 13 December 1972) is an American and British businessman. He is the younger son of media tycoon Rupert Murdoch and the former chief executive officer (CEO) of 21st Century Fox from 2015 to 2019.

He was the chairman and CEO for Europe and Asia of News Corporation until 2013 when it was split into News Corp and 21st Century Fox. He was formerly a director of News Corp and was a member of the office of the chairman. Until April 2012, he was the chairman and CEO of Sky plc, Europe and Asia, where he oversaw assets such as News International (publisher of The News of the World newspaper), Sky Italia, Sky Deutschland, and STAR TV.

Murdoch was executive chairman of News International from 2007. He previously held a non-executive chair at British Sky Broadcasting, in which News Corporation had a controlling minority stake. In April 2012, he was forced to resign as chairman of BSkyB in the wake of the ongoing phone hacking scandal, in which he was implicated and severely criticised in a parliamentary report. He was reappointed chairman of the company following its merger with its Italian and German sister companies to form Sky plc.

In July 2020, he resigned from the board of News Corp due to disagreements with its editorial content and strategic direction. In 2021, Murdoch set up the Indian arm of his family office, Lupa Systems India, as a joint venture with businessman Uday Shankar.

As of September 2024, the whole Murdoch family is involved in a court case in the US in which James, his sister Elisabeth and half-sister Prudence are challenging their father's bid to amend the family trust to ensure that his eldest son, Lachlan, retains sole control of News Corp and Fox Corp, rather than benefiting all of his six children, as is specified in the "irrevocable" terms of the trust.

== Early life and education ==
James Rupert Jacob Murdoch was born on 13 December 1972 at Wimbledon Hospital in Wimbledon, London, England. He is the fourth child of billionaire media mogul Rupert Murdoch's six children, and the third with Scottish-born journalist and author Anna Murdoch Mann (née Torv), the others being Elisabeth and Lachlan.

As a youngster James was regarded as the brightest of the Murdoch children, but also considered something of a rebel. He first came to public notice as a 15-year-old intern at the Sydney Daily Mirror but made headlines in the rival The Sydney Morning Herald after he was photographed asleep on a sofa at a press conference.

Murdoch attended Horace Mann School in New York City. He then studied film and history at Harvard University, where he was a member of the Harvard Lampoon. He dropped out of university in 1995 without completing his studies to follow the Grateful Dead and set up a hip hop record label. With university friends Brian Brater and Jarret Myer, he backed the establishment of Rawkus Records, an independent hip hop record label. The company was bought by News Corporation in 1998.

== Business career ==
In 1996, Murdoch joined News Corporation and was appointed chairman of Festival Records. He took charge of News Corporation's internet operations, where he invested in a series of ventures, including financial website TheStreet and the short-lived online music site Whammo, with mixed results. He also continued to contribute cartoons to US magazine Gear.

He is credited with sparking his father's interest in the internet, and he reportedly tried to persuade his father to buy internet company PointCast for US$450 million. It was subsequently sold to another company for $7 million.

After installing a new management team at Festival, Murdoch purchased the controlling 51% share of Mushroom Records in 1999, and the merged group was rebranded as Festival Mushroom Records (FMR). It was at first thought that News Corporation might use FMR as the foundation of a new international entertainment company, but FMR struggled while Murdoch was in charge and after his departure its fortunes declined rapidly. FMR was closed in late 2005 and its remaining assets were sold: the recording catalogue was sold to the Australian division of Warner Music for AU$10 million in October 2005, and the publishing division was sold to Michael Gudinski a month later, for an undisclosed sum.

In May 2000, Murdoch was appointed chairman and chief executive of News Corporation's ailing Asian satellite service Star Television, which at the time was losing £100 million a year, and he moved to Hong Kong.

In February 2003, Murdoch became a director of BSkyB. Later that year, he controversially became CEO of BSkyB, in which News Corporation owned a controlling minority stake. His appointment sparked accusations of nepotism, with some commentators and shareholders feeling that the job had not been opened to outsiders and that Murdoch was too young and inexperienced to run one of the UK's top companies He was an executive vice-president of News Corporation (the controlling shareholder of BSkyB) and served on the board of directors of News Datacom and of News Corporation.

Following the surprise resignation of his brother Lachlan Murdoch from his executive positions at News Corporation in July 2005, James was viewed as his father's heir-apparent.

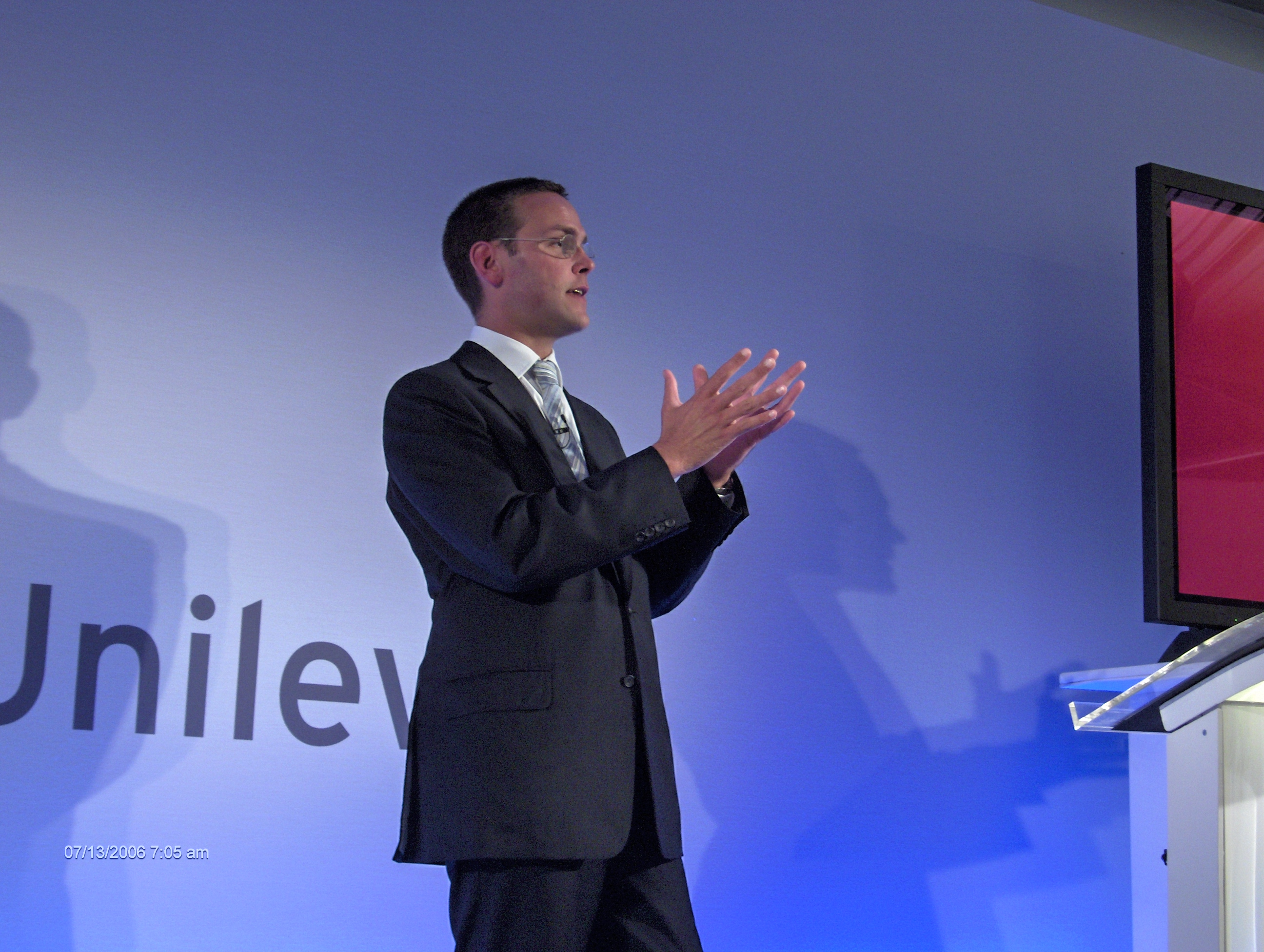
Murdoch at a digital media conference in 2006

In December 2007, Murdoch stepped down as CEO from BSkyB and was appointed non-executive chairman of the company (a position formerly held by his father).

In a related announcement, Murdoch also took "direct responsibility for the strategic and operational development of News Corporation's television, newspaper, and related digital assets in Europe, Asia, and the Middle East." This included holdings such as News International, Sky Italia, STAR Group ltd and possibly other News Corporation related assets. He was based at News International's headquarters in Wapping, East London.

In February 2009, Murdoch was appointed a non-executive director with the British pharmaceutical company GlaxoSmithKline.

In August 2009, Murdoch delivered the James MacTaggart Memorial Lecture at the Edinburgh International Television Festival, in which he attacked the BBC and UK media regulator Ofcom calling the BBC's expansion "chilling" and also said: "In this all-media marketplace, the expansion of state-sponsored journalism is a threat to the plurality and independence of news provision, which are so important for our democracy." The BBC chairman, Sir Michael Lyons officially responded, "We have to be careful not to reduce the whole of broadcasting to some simple economic transactions. The BBC's public purposes stress the importance of the well-tested principles of educating and informing, and an impartial contribution to debate in the UK."

In April 2010, Murdoch and his associate Rebekah Brooks entered the offices of The Independent to complain about an advertisement campaign by the newspaper.

Until April 2012, he was the chairman and CEO of Sky plc, Europe and Asia, where he oversaw assets such as News International (publisher of The News of the World newspaper), Sky Italia, Sky Deutschland, and STAR TV.

He was executive chairman of News International from 2007 until February 2012. He previously held a non-executive chair at British Sky Broadcasting, in which News Corporation had a controlling minority stake. In April 2012, he was forced to resign as chairman of BSkyB in the wake of the ongoing phone hacking scandal, in which he was implicated.

In April 2014, it was announced that Murdoch would join the board of advertising start-up True[X] Media.

In June 2015, his father, Rupert, announced that he would be leaving his position as CEO of 21st Century Fox and James would take over the position. In March 2019, 21st Century Fox was sold to The Walt Disney Company, ending Murdoch's tenure as CEO.

In January 2016, Murdoch became the chairman of Sky, Britain's subscription broadcaster. He left in October 2018 after Comcast took the majority control of the company.

In July 2017, Murdoch became an independent director on the board of Tesla.

In August 2019, Murdoch was a director of News Corp. In July 2020, he resigned from the board. His resignation letter stated that his resignation was "due to disagreements over certain editorial content published by the company's news outlets and certain other strategic decisions". He criticised the "ongoing denial of the role of climate change" seen in the Australian outlets, following the particularly devastating 2019–20 Australian bushfire season.

In 2021, Murdoch set up the Indian arm of his family office, Lupa Systems India, as a joint venture with businessman Uday Shankar. The aim of the joint venture was to focus on media, education, and the healthcare sectors in Asia, particularly India. In May 2022, Lupa India (renamed to Bodhi Tree Systems) announced a US$600 million investment in the test-prep company Allen Career Institute Private Limited for a 36% stake, and completed the deal in July. In April 2023, Bodhi Tree acquired a 13% stake in the Reliance-owned media and entertainment company, Viacom18, and subsequently increased it to 16% by August 2023. In February 2024, Viacom18 and Disney Star entered into a joint venture to form an $8.5 billion entity.

In May 2026, Murdoch signed an agreement for Lupa Systems to acquire part of Vox Media, which included New York magazine, the Vox podcast network, and the Vox news website. While neither parties have disclosed the price of the deal, The New York Times cited familiar sources saying it was more than $300 million. The subsidiaries were expected to officially begin operating under Lupa Systems by late June 2026.

== 2011 phone hacking scandal and aftermath ==
On 7 July 2011, James Murdoch announced the closure of the British tabloid newspaper the News of the World in the wake of a phone hacking scandal.

On 19 July 2011, along with his father, Rupert, he appeared at a hearing of the Commons Culture, Media and Sport Committee. He appeared once again before the same committee on 10 November 2011. James maintained that until late in 2010 he was unaware that more than one "rogue reporter" from the News of the World tabloid had been involved in phone hacking. This statement was challenged by the formal legal manager and editor for the newspaper, who claimed they had informed James of the "Transcript for Neville" email, a potential "smoking gun" indicating several of the newspaper's journalists may have been involved, during the settlement negotiations with Gorden Taylor in 2008 and alerted him to the potential liability if this document became public. On 22 July 2011, Britain's prime minister, David Cameron, said that Murdoch had "questions to answer in Parliament," a day after former top executives of the News of the World accused the News Corporation executive of giving "mistaken" evidence.

In November 2011, British newspapers reported that Murdoch had resigned as chairman of News Group Newspapers, the holding company above The Sun, News of the World and Times Newspapers Ltd, itself owner of The Times and The Sunday Times. News Group Newspapers is the company subject to a series of lawsuits, all related to the phone hacking scandal. James Murdoch's resignation was also said to be related to the 12 October 2011 resignation of another Dow Jones executive, Andrew Langhoff, after a company whistleblower revealed an editorial scam and questionable circulation dealings at The Wall Street Journal Europe.

In February 2012, News Corp announced that Murdoch would be stepping down as executive chairman of its British newspaper arm. The company said he would remain deputy chief operating officer of News Corp and focus on the company's international TV business, including continued responsibility for BSkyB. He stepped down also from the GlaxoSmithKline board. In April 2012, he stood down as chairman of BSkyB, but remained on the board. He was replaced as chairman by Nicholas Ferguson. In May 2012, a highly critical UK Parliamentary report said that Murdoch "showed wilful ignorance of the extent of phone-hacking" and found him "guilty of an astonishing lack of curiosity" over the issue. It went on to say that both Murdoch and his father "should ultimately be prepared to take responsibility" for wrongdoing at the News of the World and News International. In September 2012, Murdoch was criticised by the British Office of Communications (Ofcom), which concluded that he "repeatedly fell short of the conduct to be expected of as a chief executive and chairman" and that his lack of action in relation to phone hacking was "difficult to comprehend and ill-judged".

== Family court case (2024) ==
In 2024, the Murdoch family was involved in a court case in Reno, Nevada, in which James, his sister Elisabeth, and half-sister Prudence MacLeod challenged their father's bid to amend the family trust to ensure that his eldest son, Lachlan, retains control of News Corp and Fox Corp, rather than benefiting all of his six children, as was specified in the "irrevocable" terms of the trust. According to The New York Times, Rupert wanted his companies to remain politically conservative, and sees his other children as too politically liberal.

The irrevocable family trust was set up after Rupert and Anna Murdoch's divorce in 1999, to hold the family's 28.5% stake in News Corp. It relates only to the children born before then, giving them equal say in the fate of the business after Rupert's death. Chloe and Grace Murdoch, Rupert's children with his third wife Wendi Deng, will have no say in the business, but will share the stock proceeds. The case follows Rupert's attempt to change the trust in 2023, and the Nevada probate commissioner's finding that he was allowed to amend the trust "if he is able to show he is acting in good faith and for the sole benefit of his heirs". Rupert Murdoch argued interference by the other siblings would cause a financial loss to Fox, and it was therefore "in their own best interests if they have their votes taken away from them". He argued that preserving the outlet's conservative editorial stance against interference by the more politically moderate siblings would better protect its commercial value.

The case led to James, as well as sisters Elisabeth and Prudence, becoming estranged from their father; none of the three attended his wedding to his fifth wife, Elena Zhukova, in June 2024.

A $3.3 billion settlement was reached on September 8, 2025, granting Lachlan control of the News Corp. and Fox Corp. media empire, "until at least 2050", with the three other siblings each receiving one third of the proceeds.

== Personal life and other activities ==
Murdoch is a British citizen by birth and a naturalised US citizen. Apart from full siblings Elisabeth and Lachlan Murdoch, he has three half-siblings, including an elder half-sister Prudence, and two younger half-sisters by his father's third marriage to Wendi Deng, Grace and Chloe.

Murdoch was instrumental in the formation of Sky Procycling and is a keen cyclist himself. He maintains an early morning gym routine and has a black belt in karate.

Murdoch married Kathryn Hufschmid in 2000, and they have three children: Anneka, Walter, and Emerson. Kathryn worked for the Clinton Climate Initiative from 2006 to 2011, a charitable foundation set up by former U.S. President Bill Clinton.

Since 2014, James and Kathryn have run the Quadrivium Foundation, which supports "initiatives that address the root causes of problems and where single actions can create multiple positive outcomes". It is focused on five key areas: democracy, technology and society, scientific understanding, climate change, and the health of the world's oceans. It invests in evidence-based solutions to problems.

Murdoch has donated money to the Clinton Foundation, the nonprofit organisation run by Chelsea, Bill, and Hillary Clinton.

In 2020, Murdoch and his wife each donated US$615,000 to the Biden campaign. In September 2024, he was one of 88 American corporate leaders who signed an open letter endorsing vice-president Kamala Harris for president.

He has been highly critical of Fox News' promotion of Donald Trump's false claims of election fraud after he lost the 2020 election. Fox was subsequently successfully sued for defamation, losing over $US787 million in costs.

== See also ==
- News media phone hacking scandal
- News International phone hacking scandal
- Phone hacking scandal reference lists
- Metropolitan police role in phone hacking scandal
