= Elisabeth Murdoch (businesswoman) =

British and American media executive (born 1968)

Elisabeth Murdoch CBE
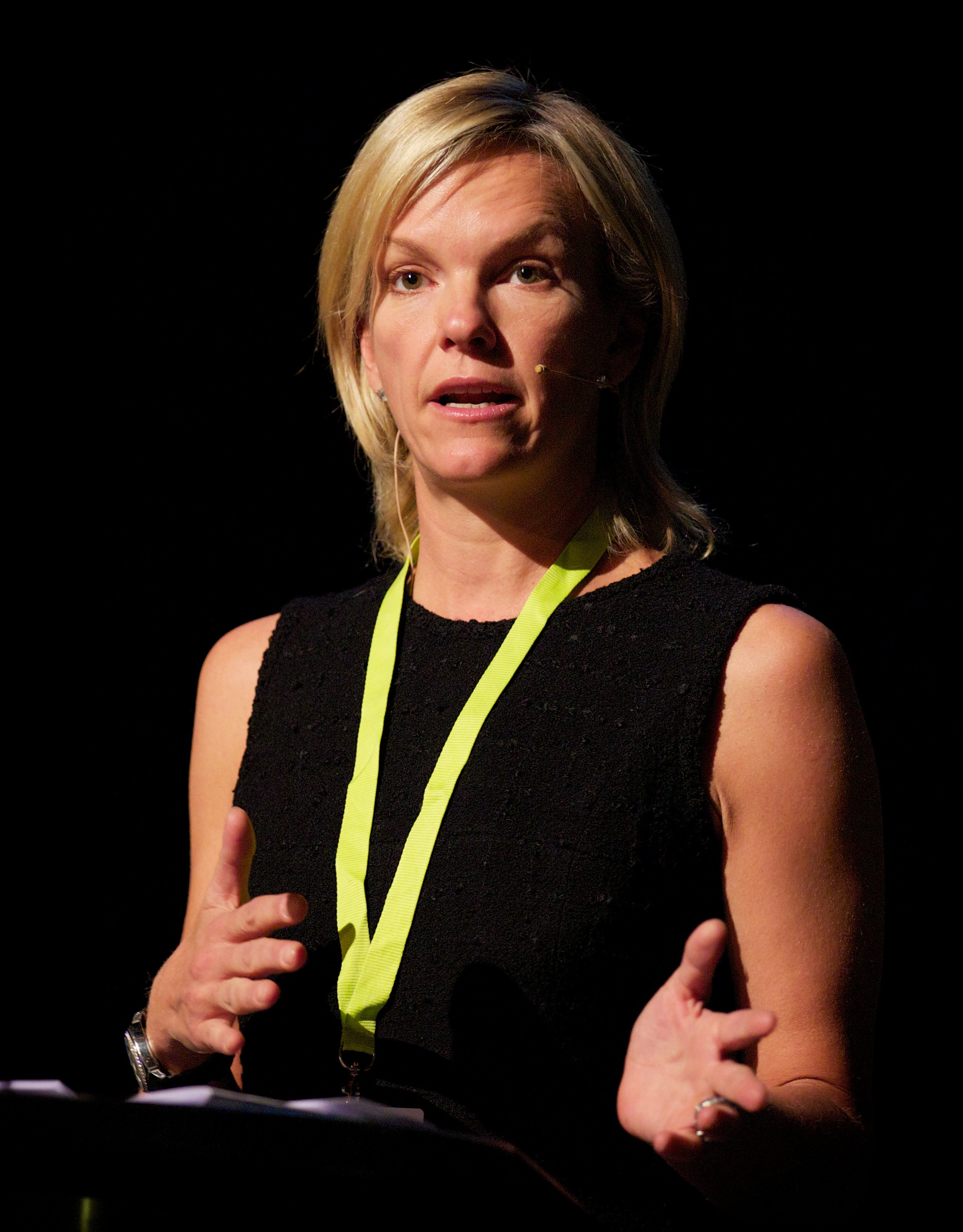
- Murdoch in 2010
- Born: 22 August 1968 (age 57); Sydney, New South Wales, Australia
- Citizenship: British; American
- Education: Vassar College (AB)
- Occupations: Journalist, media executive
- Spouses: Elkin Kwesi Pianim (m. 1993; div. 1998) Matthew Freud (m. 2001; div. 2014) Keith Tyson (m. 2017)
- Children: 4
- Parents: Rupert Murdoch (father); Anna dePeyster (née Torv) (mother)
- Family: Murdoch

Elisabeth Murdoch CBE (born 22 August 1968) is an Australian-born British and American media executive based in the United Kingdom. She was a non-executive chairperson of Shine Group, the UK-based TV programme production company she founded in 2001, until the company's parent 21st Century Fox merged its Shine Group division with Apollo Global Management's Endemol and Core Media production houses, to specialise in reality TV, in 2015. She is the daughter of the media tycoon Rupert Murdoch, and is widely believed to be the inspiration for the character Shiv Roy in the television series Succession.

As of September 2024, the whole Murdoch family is involved in a court case in the US in which Elisabeth, her brother James, and elder half-sister Prudence are challenging their father's bid to amend the family trust to ensure that his eldest son, Lachlan, retains control of News Corp and Fox Corp, rather than benefiting all of his six children, as is specified in the "irrevocable" terms of the trust.

== Early life and education ==
Elisabeth Murdoch was born on 22 August 1968 at King George V Memorial Hospital in Sydney. Her father is the media tycoon, Rupert Murdoch, and her mother is his second wife, journalist and author Anna Maria dePeyster (née Torv). Elisabeth Murdoch was named after her grandmother, Dame Elisabeth Murdoch. She is the eldest of three in her birth family, with two younger brothers, Lachlan and James. They all came after their elder half-sister, Prudence MacLeod (born 1958), from Rupert's first marriage to Patricia Booker, but they grew up together in London (after 1968) and then New York (after 1974).

Elisabeth Murdoch completed her secondary education at the Brearley School in New York City, and graduated with a bachelor's degree from Vassar College in Poughkeepsie, New York.

== Career ==
Murdoch began her career as a manager of programme acquisitions at her father's FX Networks, a cable television unit based in Los Angeles. Operating as EP Communications on 22 September 1994, Murdoch and her then-husband Elkin Kwesi Pianim purchased a pair of NBC-affiliate television stations (KSBW and KSBY) in California on a US$35 million loan, being secured by her father.

Murdoch moved with her husband to the UK, where her father Rupert Murdoch was running BSkyB (which was struggling financially). After Sam Chisholm joined the company to manage the day-to-day operations and build the subscriber base, Murdoch served as his second-in-command and de facto apprentice. By the time Chisholm left the company, BSkyB was the most profitable company in the UK. As a managing director, Murdoch oversaw BSkyB's £12 million sponsorship of the troubled Millennium Dome. However, she also faced criticism after brokering her father's failed £623.4 million bid for English Premier League club Manchester United.

In 2000 Murdoch resigned from the family business, and in March 2001 founded the television production company Shine Limited, which produced hit shows such as MasterChef. The company expanded under her leadership, acquiring other production companies including Princess Productions and Kudos, which had made Spooks and Broadchurch. In 2011, Shine Group was acquired by News Corporation in a controversial deal that raised questions about nepotism, with Murdoch pocketing a personal profit of around £130m, despite Shine having a large debt bill. After 21st Century Fox merged Shine with Endemol and Core Media in 2014, Murdoch stepped down as chair of the company.

In 2018, Murdoch produced a dating reality show called Phone Swap, which was originally aired on Snapchat.

On 1 October 2019, Murdoch co-founded, with Jane Featherstone and Stacey Snider, the global TV and film production and development company Sister, which is headquartered in London with offices in Manchester, New York City, and Los Angeles. She had formerly been a major investor in Featherstone's production company, Sister Pictures, which was absorbed by the new company, incorporating existing team members.

As of 2025 she is executive chair of Sister Pictures.

== Other activities ==
Murdoch has served on many organisational boards, including Afiniti.

Murdoch delivered the 2012 MacTaggart Lecture at the 2012 Edinburgh International Television Festival, after which her father did not speak to her for two months. She afterwards regretted not speaking more positively about her brother James, who had been involved in the News International phone hacking scandal in 2011.

== Recognition and honours ==
Murdoch was appointed as the Commander of the Order of the British Empire in the 2022 Birthday Honours for services to diversity in the arts and to charity, based on her work as a council member on the Arts Council England.

== Influence and media coverage ==
In later 2012, The New Yorker published a lengthy profile of Murdoch.

In February 2013, Murdoch was assessed as the fifth most powerful woman in the United Kingdom by Woman's Hour on BBC Radio 4.

In 2014, she was highest placed UK-based woman in the "MediaGuardian 100".

Murdoch is widely understood to be the inspiration for the character Shiv Roy in the television series Succession, which is based on the Murdoch family. Aspects of Murdoch's career, including her troubled stint at BSkyB, are mirrored by the Shiv character. According to Murdoch's daughter, Charlotte Freud, the notion the series is based on the family is accurate. Freud has said "my mum is very Shiv" but that her mother disagrees with that view. According to Succession star Brian Cox, when he met Murdoch's husband Keith Tyson in a London café Tyson confirmed that the couple were fans of the show.

== Personal life ==
Murdoch is a dual national of the United States and the United Kingdom. In 2008, she hosted a fund-raising event for then Senator Barack Obama at her home in Notting Hill in London.

Murdoch's first marriage was to a fellow Vassar graduate, Elkin Kwesi Pianim, an associate in the New York corporate finance department of the Rothschild investment bank. He is the son of Ghanaian-born economist and financier Kwame Pianim and Dutch-born Cornelia Pianim. The wedding was held on 10 September 1993 at St. Timothy Catholic Church near the Beverly Hills residence of the bride's parents. They have two children, but divorced in 1998.

Murdoch's second marriage was to public relations executive Matthew Freud, the son of former MP Sir Clement Freud and great-grandson of Sigmund Freud. The couple married on 18 August 2001 in a ceremony at Blenheim Palace, and have two children. From 2008, the family resided at Burford Priory in Oxfordshire, where they were key members of the Chipping Norton set. Freud had a poor relationship with his father-in-law, and did not invite him to his 50th birthday party in 2013. The couple owned a home in Notting Hill, London, before filing for divorce in October 2014.

In 2017 Murdoch married artist Keith Tyson.

She has an elder half-sister, Prudence MacLeod, and two younger half-sisters, Grace and Chloe, from her father's third marriage to Wendi Deng Murdoch.

She lives in the UK, as of 2014 residing in the St John's Wood area of London.

She is known for her passion for the arts, and is said to have more left-leaning political views than her father, or brother Lachlan.

== Family court case ==
In September 2024, the whole Murdoch family is involved in a court case in Reno, Nevada, in which Elisabeth, her brother James Murdoch, and half-sister Prudence are challenging their father's bid to amend the family trust to ensure that his eldest son, Lachlan, retains control of News Corp and Fox Corp, rather than benefiting all of his six children, as is specified in the "irrevocable" terms of the trust. According to The New York Times, Murdoch Snr wants his companies to remain politically conservative, and sees his other children as too politically liberal.

The irrevocable family trust was set up after Rupert and Anna Murdoch's divorce in 1999, to hold the family's 28.5% stake in News Corp. It relates only to the children born before then, giving them equal say in the fate of the business after Rupert's death. Chloe and Grace Murdoch, Rupert's children with third wife Wendi Deng, will have no say in the business, although will share the stock proceeds. The case follows Rupert's attempt to change the trust in 2023, and the Nevada probate commissioner's finding that he was allowed to amend the trust "if he is able to show he is acting in good faith and for the sole benefit of his heirs". Rupert Murdoch is arguing interference by the other siblings would cause a financial loss to Fox, and therefore "in their own best interests if they have their votes taken away from them". He argues that preserving the outlet's conservative editorial stance against interference by the more politically moderate siblings would better protect its commercial value.

The case has led to the three children becoming estranged from their father, with none of them attending his wedding to his fifth wife, Elena Zhukova, in June 2024.
