= Phone Swap (TV series) =

2018 American reality television series

Phone Swap is a 2018 American dating reality television series that consists of potential lovers looking into each other's phones. This originally created Snapchat show premiered on Fox for a short period of time.

== Background ==
The series was produced by Vertical Networks and Elisabeth Murdoch.

Its the first show to migrate from mobile to TV.

Phone Swap was directed by Sun-Ho Pak.

== Format ==
For every episode, singles are sent on blind dates and are forced to swap each other's phones. Later in the show, contestants have to decide if they still want to get to know one another on a personal level.

== Cast ==
- Vivian Adaobi as herself
- Asia Ifield as herself
- Dan Babic as himself
- Brinn Abbate as herself
- Tyrone Evans Clark as himself
