= Nicholas Ferguson (businessman) =

- Born: Nicholas Eustace Haddon Ferguson; 24 October 1948 (age 77)
- Education: University of Edinburgh and Harvard Business School
- Occupation: Businessman
- Years active: 1969–present
- Title: Chairman of BskyB plc
- Term: 2012–present
- Predecessor: James Murdoch
- Successor: Incumbent

Nicholas Eustace Haddon Ferguson CBE (born 24 October 1948) is a British businessman, the chairman of BskyB plc and former chairman of SVG Capital plc.

== Early life ==
Ferguson has a bachelor's degree in economics from the University of Edinburgh, and an MBA from Harvard Business School.

== Career ==
From 1996 to 2005, Ferguson was chief executive of SVG Capital, until he moved on to the chairmanship in 2006. Ferguson resigned as chairman of SVG Capital, prior to becoming chairman of BskyB in April 2012, replacing James Murdoch.

According to The Financial Times, "After eight years as a non-executive director, some investors question whether Mr Ferguson is sufficiently independent of the News Corp empire".

He was also first chairman (2002–2012) of the Courtauld Institute of Art.
