= Anna dePeyster =

British and Australian journalist (1944–2026)

Anna dePeyster DSG
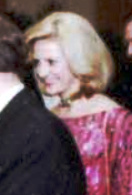
- Anna dePeyster (then Murdoch) in 1981
- Born: Anna Maria Torv; 30 June 1944; Glasgow, Scotland
- Died: 17 February 2026 (aged 81); Palm Beach, Florida, U.S.
- Occupations: Journalist; novelist
- Spouses: Rupert Murdoch (m. 1967; div. 1999) William Mann (m. 1999; died 2017) Ashton dePeyster (m. 2019)
- Children: Elisabeth; Lachlan; James
- Relatives: Anna Torv (niece)

Anna Maria dePeyster DSG (née Torv; formerly Murdoch and Mann; 30 June 1944 – 17 February 2026) was a British and Australian journalist and novelist. She became the second wife of media mogul Rupert Murdoch, and was a director at News Corp.

== Early life and education ==
Anna Maria Torv was born in Glasgow, Scotland on 30 June 1944, to Jakob Tõrv (anglicised Jacob Torv), an Estonian merchant seaman, and Sylvia Iris Bodfish, a Scottish drycleaner's shop assistant. Her parents had a drycleaning business in Glasgow, until they emigrated to Australia in 1953.

After the picnic park that her parents had opened in Blacktown went bankrupt, her mother left the family household. She has two brothers, Jaan and Hans Arvid, and one sister, Karin Elisabeth. Raised Catholic, she attended St Patrick's Catholic School in Blacktown and completed her secondary education at Our Lady of Mercy College Parramatta, New South Wales. because St Patrick's at Blacktown did not offer the final two years of secondary education.

== Career ==
Torv started her journalistic career at the age of 18, working on Sydney's Daily Mirror, and also worked as a journalist for the Sydney Daily Telegraph. She later served on the board of directors of News Corporation.

== Writing ==
Under the name Anna Murdoch, she wrote the novel In Her Own Image (1985). It is about two sisters who fall in love with the same man on a sheep station close to the Murrumbidgee River.

== Personal life and death ==
Torv was married to media mogul Rupert Murdoch from 1967 to 1999. She and Murdoch had three children:

- Elisabeth Murdoch (born 1968)
- Lachlan Murdoch (born 1971)
- James Murdoch (born 1972)

According to The Independent, the people who in 1969 kidnapped and then killed Muriel McKay, wife of Murdoch's deputy Alick McKay, had originally intended to kidnap Anna Murdoch instead, and confusion arose when the McKays had made use of one of Murdoch's vehicles.

They divorced on 8 June 1999 as a result of Rupert's affair with Wendi Deng. Anna reportedly received $1.7 billion (including $110 million in cash) from the settlement. A later report said that she chose to take a "relatively small" settlement, comprising half cash and half property, of $US200 million, rather than go for half of his wealth, to which she was entitled under California law. She said in a 2001 interview that she had been entitled to some of the seven homes they had shared, but walked away from that.

She was instrumental in setting up a family trust at this time, to protect her children and to prevent Deng's children having a say in News Corp. In a 2001 interview with Australian Women's Weekly, she spoke of how badly Rupert had behaved, not only having an affair, but pushing her off the board of News Corp. The trust gives the children born before this time (including stepdaughter Prudence, from Murdoch's first marriage) equal say in the fate of the businesses: each would have one vote in the trust, while their father would have four. Almost all of the family's wealth is in shares controlling 40% of both News Corp and Fox Corporation, and is tied up in the trust, which is worth around $US6 billion. The terms of the trust dictate that the four children would continue to have these votes after Rupert's death. When Rupert Murdoch made moves to change the terms of the trust so that only Lachlan would have voting rights in his companies in 2023, the other three children challenged this in court in 2024.

She remarried six months later, in December 1999, to William Mann, a financier who was CEO of Henry Mann Securities. They remained married until his death in August 2017. During this time she was known as Anna Mann, but often referred to in the press as Anna Murdoch Mann. The couple resided in The Hamptons, New York, in a house which they bought from philanthropist Yasmin Aga Khan in 2000.

After Mann's death, she married again in April 2019 to Palm Beach property developer Ashton dePeyster, a descendant of the 17th century mayor of New York Abraham de Peyster, and became known as Anna Maria dePeyster.

She was the aunt of Australian actress Anna Torv, whose father is dePeyster's brother, the broadcaster Hans Torv.

DePeyster died at her home in Palm Beach, Florida, on 17 February 2026, at the age of 81.

== Recognition ==
In 1998, then Anna Murdoch, she was made a Dame of the Order of St. Gregory the Great, an honorary order conferred by Pope John Paul II, for having supported the Archdiocesan Education Foundation and other Catholic causes in Los Angeles. Her husband Rupert was made a knight.

== Bibliography ==
- In Her Own Image (Morrow, 1986) ISBN 9780688058876
- Family Business (Morrow, 1988) ISBN 9780449145678
- Coming to Terms (Fontana, 1992) ISBN 9780006470762
