= Rupert Murdoch =

Australian-American business magnate (born 1931)

Rupert Murdoch AC
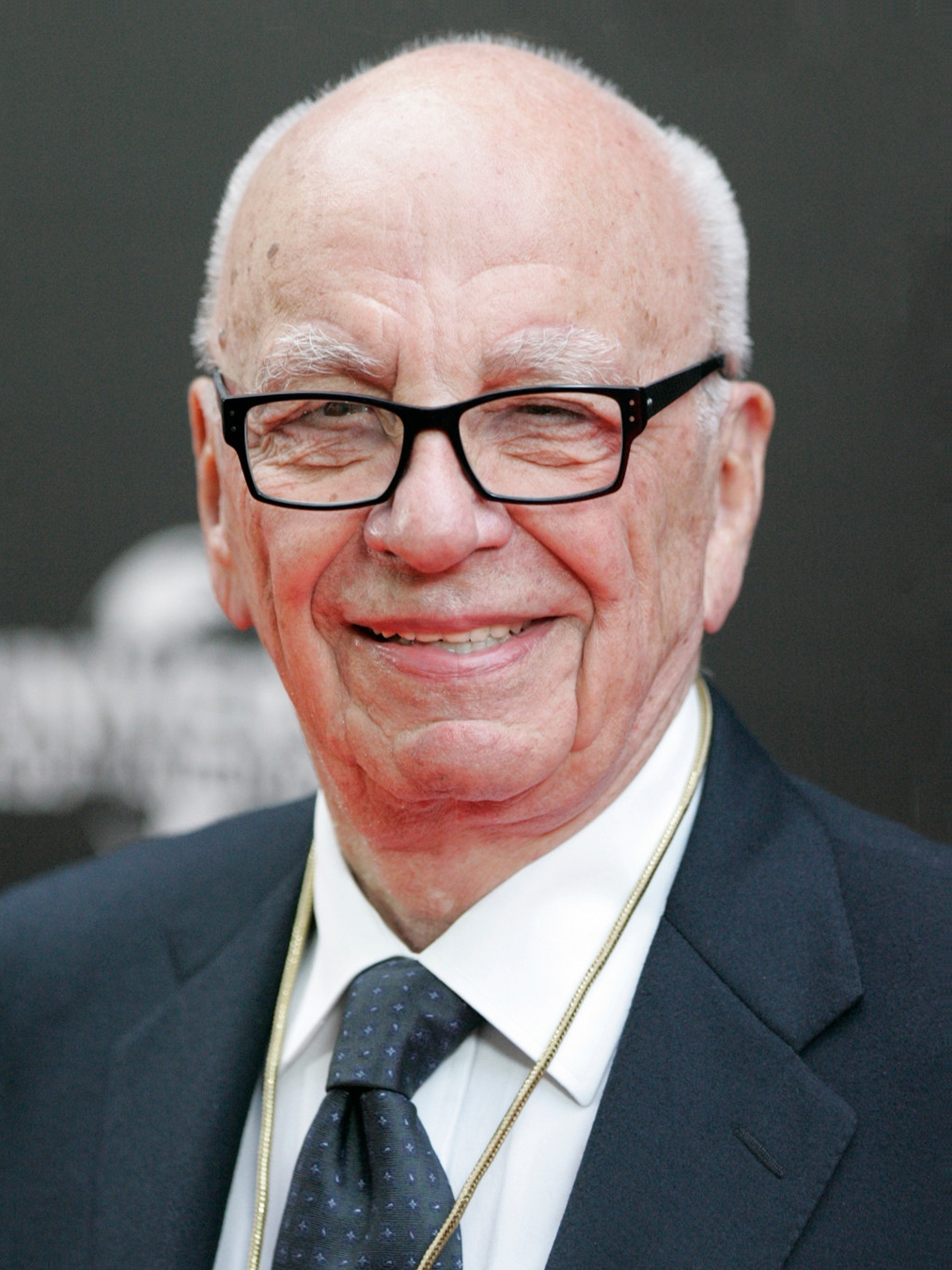
- Murdoch in 2012
- Born: Keith Rupert Murdoch; 11 March 1931 (age 95); Melbourne, Victoria, Australia
- Citizenship: Australia (until 1985) (Note: Australian citizenship lost in 1985 (under S17 of Australian Citizenship Act 1948) with acquisition of American citizenship); U.S. (from 1985)
- Education: Worcester College, Oxford (BA)
- Occupations: Businessman; investor; media proprietor
- Years active: 1952−2023
- Title: Chairman and CEO of News Corporation (1980–2013); Executive chairman of News Corp (2013–2023); Chairman and CEO of 21st Century Fox (2013–2015); Executive co-chairman of 21st Century Fox (2015–2019); Acting CEO of Fox News (2016–2018); Chairman of Fox News (2016–2019); Chairman of Fox Corporation (2019–2023)
- Board member of: News Corp; Fox Corporation
- Spouses: Patricia Booker (m. 1956; div. 1967); Anna Maria Torv (m. 1967; div. 1999); Wendi Deng (m. 1999; div. 2013); Jerry Hall (m. 2016; div. 2022); Elena Zhukova (m. 2024)
- Children: 6, including Prudence, Elisabeth, Lachlan and James
- Parents: Keith Murdoch; Elisabeth Greene
- Family: Murdoch family

Keith Rupert Murdoch (/ˈmɜːrdɒk/ MUR-dok; born 11 March 1931) is an Australian-born American business magnate, investor and media mogul. Through his company News Corp, he is the owner of hundreds of local, national and international publishing outlets around the world—including in the United Kingdom (The Sun and The Times), in Australia (The Daily Telegraph, Herald Sun and The Australian) and in the United States (The Wall Street Journal and the New York Post)—book publisher HarperCollins and the television broadcasting channels Sky News Australia and Fox News (through Fox Corporation). He was also the owner of Sky (until 2018), 21st Century Fox (until 2019) and the now-defunct News of the World. With a net worth of US$21.7 billion as of 2 March 2022, Murdoch is the 31st-richest person in the United States and the 71st richest in the world, according to Forbes magazine. Due to his extensive wealth and influence over media and politics, he has been described as an oligarch.

Murdoch was born and raised in Melbourne. After his father, Keith, died in 1952, he took over the running of The News, a small Adelaide newspaper owned by the former. In the 1950s and 1960s, he acquired a number of newspapers in Australia and New Zealand before expanding into the United Kingdom in 1969, taking over the News of the World, followed closely by The Sun. In 1974, Murdoch moved to New York City, to expand into the American market; however, he retained interests in Australia and the United Kingdom. He bought The Times, his first British broadsheet, in 1981. In 1985, Murdoch became a naturalised American citizen, giving up his Australian citizenship, to satisfy the legal requirement for American television network ownership. The next year, keen to adopt newer electronic publishing technologies, he consolidated his British printing operations in London, causing bitter industrial disputes. Murdoch's holding company News Corporation acquired Twentieth Century Fox (1985), HarperCollins (1989) and The Wall Street Journal (2007). He formed the British broadcaster BSkyB in 1990 and, during the 1990s, expanded into Asian networks and South American television. By 2000, his News Corporation owned more than 800 companies in more than 50 countries, with a net worth of more than $5 billion.

Many of Murdoch's papers and television channels have been accused of right-wing bias and misleading coverage to support his business interests and political allies, and some have linked his influence with major political developments in the United Kingdom, United States and Australia. In 2011, he faced allegations that his companies—including the News of the World, owned by News Corporation—had been regularly hacking the phones of celebrities, royalty and public citizens, as well as subsequent investigations into bribery and corruption by the British government and the FBI. He resigned as a director of News International the next year. In 2023, Murdoch announced that he would be stepping down as chairman of Fox Corp. and News Corp.

The Murdoch family was involved in a U.S. court case in which Rupert's three children—Elisabeth, Prudence and James—challenged his bid to amend the family trust to ensure that his eldest son, Lachlan, retains sole control of News Corp and Fox Corp, rather than the trust benefiting all of his six children, as is specified in its "irrevocable" terms. In 2025, they reached a settlement, giving Lachlan ownership of Murdoch's media empire.

== Early life and education ==
Keith Rupert Murdoch was born on 11 March 1931 in Melbourne, Victoria, the son of Sir Keith Arthur Murdoch and Dame Elisabeth Joy (née Greene). He is of English, Irish and Scottish ancestry. His parents were also born in Melbourne. His father was a war correspondent and later a regional newspaper magnate; he owned two newspapers in Adelaide, South Australia, and a radio station in a remote mining town, and was chairman of the Herald and Weekly Times publishing company. The second of four children, Murdoch has three sisters. His paternal grandfather, Patrick John Murdoch, was a Scottish-born Presbyterian minister who immigrated to Australia in 1884.

Murdoch attended Geelong Grammar School, where he was co-editor of the school's official journal The Corian and editor of the student journal If Revived. Murdoch then studied philosophy, politics and economics at Worcester College, Oxford, where he kept a bust of Lenin in his rooms and came to be known as "Red Rupert". He was a member of the Oxford University Labour Party, stood for secretary of the Labour Club and managed Oxford Student Publications Limited, the publishing house of Cherwell.

After his father's death from cancer in 1952, Murdoch's mother did charity work as the life governor of the Royal Women's Hospital and established the Murdoch Children's Research Institute. She had 74 descendants in 2011. While his father was alive, Murdoch worked part-time at the Melbourne Herald and was groomed by the former to take over the family business. After his father's death, he began working as a sub-editor with the Daily Express for two years.

== Activities in Australia and New Zealand ==
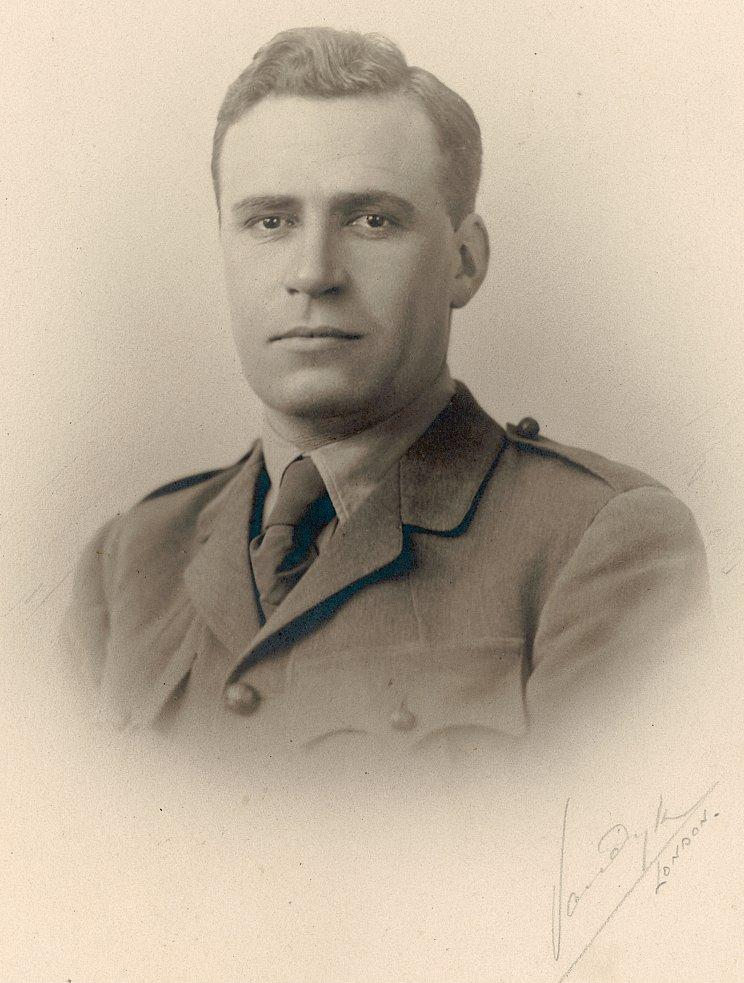
Journalist Sir Keith Murdoch (1885–1952), Rupert Murdoch's father

Following his father's death, when he was 21, Murdoch returned from Oxford to take charge of what was left of the family business. After liquidation of his father's Herald stake to pay taxes, what was left was News Limited, which had been established in 1923. Rupert Murdoch turned its Adelaide newspaper, The News, its main asset, into a major success. He began to direct his attention to acquisition and expansion, buying the troubled Sunday Times in Perth, Western Australia (1956) and over the next few years acquiring suburban and provincial newspapers in New South Wales, Queensland, Victoria and the Northern Territory, including the Sydney afternoon tabloid The Daily Mirror (1960). The Economist describes Murdoch as "inventing the modern tabloid", as he developed a pattern for his newspapers, increasing sports and scandal coverage and adopting eye-catching headlines.

Murdoch's first foray outside Australia involved the purchase of a controlling interest in the New Zealand daily The Dominion. In January 1964, while touring New Zealand with friends in a rented Morris Minor after sailing across the Tasman, Murdoch read of a takeover bid for the Wellington paper by the British-based Canadian newspaper magnate Lord Thomson of Fleet. On the spur of the moment, he launched a counter-bid. A four-way battle for control ensued in which the 32-year-old Murdoch was ultimately successful.

Later in 1964, Murdoch launched The Australian, Australia's first national daily newspaper, which was based first in Canberra and later in Sydney. In 1972, Murdoch acquired the Sydney morning tabloid The Daily Telegraph from Australian media mogul Sir Frank Packer, who later regretted selling it to him. In 1984, Murdoch was appointed Companion of the Order of Australia (AC) for services to publishing.

After the Keating government relaxed media ownership laws, in 1986 Murdoch launched a takeover bid for The Herald and Weekly Times, which was the largest newspaper publisher in Australia. There was a three-way takeover battle between Murdoch, Fairfax and Robert Holmes à Court, with Murdoch succeeding after agreeing to some divestments.

In 1999, Murdoch significantly expanded his music holdings in Australia by acquiring the controlling share in a leading Australian independent label, Michael Gudinski's Mushroom Records; he merged that with Festival Records, and the result was Festival Mushroom Records (FMR). Both Festival and FMR were managed by Murdoch's son James Murdoch for several years.

=== Political activities in Australia ===
Murdoch found a political ally in Sir John McEwen, leader of the Australian Country Party (now known as the National Party of Australia), who was governing in coalition with the larger Menzies-Holt-Gorton Liberal Party. From the first issue of The Australian, Murdoch began taking McEwen's side in every issue that divided the long-serving coalition partners. (The Australian, 15 July 1964, first edition, front page: "Strain in Cabinet, Liberal-CP row flares.") It was an issue that threatened to split the coalition government and open the way for the stronger Australian Labor Party to dominate Australian politics. It was the beginning of a long campaign that served McEwen well.

After McEwen and Menzies retired, Murdoch threw his growing power behind the Australian Labor Party under the leadership of Gough Whitlam and duly saw it elected in 1972 on a social platform that included universal free health care, free education for all Australians to tertiary level, recognition of the People's Republic of China, and public ownership of Australia's oil, gas and mineral resources. Rupert Murdoch's backing of Whitlam turned out to be brief. Murdoch had already started his short-lived National Star newspaper in America, and was seeking to strengthen his political contacts there.

Asked about the 2007 Australian federal election at News Corporation's annual general meeting in New York on 19 October 2007, its chairman Rupert Murdoch said: "I am not commenting on anything to do with Australian politics. I'm sorry. I always get into trouble when I do that." Pressed as to whether he believed Prime Minister John Howard should continue as prime minister, he said: "I have nothing further to say. I'm sorry. Read our editorials in the papers. It'll be the journalists who decide that – the editors."

Murdoch described Howard's successor, Labor Party Prime Minister Kevin Rudd, as "more ambitious to lead the world [in tackling climate change] than to lead Australia" and criticised Rudd's expansionary fiscal policies in the wake of the 2008 financial crisis as unnecessary. In 2009, in response to accusations by Rudd that News Limited was running vendettas against him and his government, Murdoch opined that Rudd was "oversensitive". Although News Limited's interests are extensive, also including the Daily Telegraph, the Courier-Mail and the Adelaide Advertiser, it was suggested by the commentator Mungo MacCallum in The Monthly that "the anti-Rudd push, if coordinated at all, was almost certainly locally driven" as opposed to being directed by Murdoch, who also took a different position from local editors on such matters as climate change and stimulus packages to mitigate the effects of the 2008 financial crisis.

Murdoch is a supporter of the formation of an Australian republic, having campaigned for such a change during the 1999 referendum.

== Activities in the United Kingdom ==
=== Business activities in the United Kingdom ===
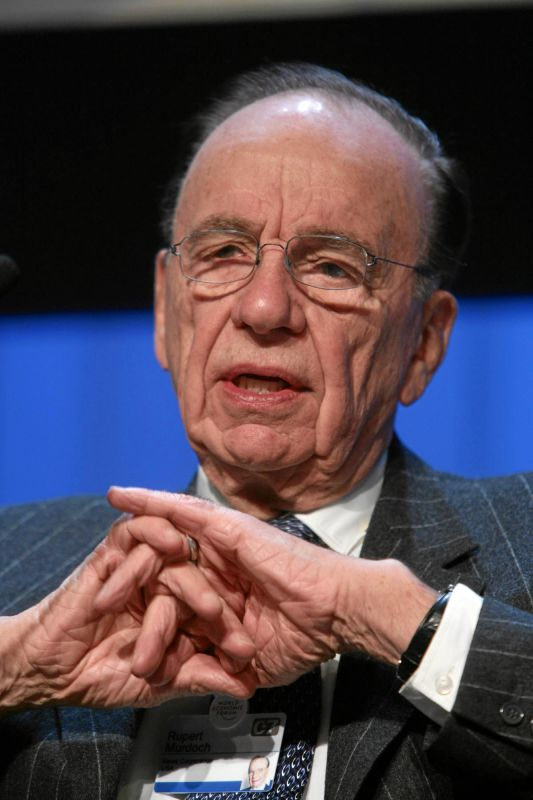
Murdoch – World Economic Forum Annual Meeting in Davos, in 2007

In 1968, Murdoch entered the British newspaper market with his acquisition of the populist News of the World, followed in 1969 with the purchase of the struggling daily The Sun from IPC. Murdoch turned The Sun into a tabloid format and reduced costs by using the same printing press for both newspapers. On acquiring it, he appointed Albert 'Larry' Lamb as editor and – Lamb recalled later – told him: "I want a tearaway paper with lots of tits in it". In 1997 The Sun attracted 10 million daily readers. In 1981, Murdoch acquired the struggling Times and Sunday Times from Canadian newspaper publisher Lord Thomson of Fleet. Ownership of The Times came to him through his relationship with Lord Thomson, who had grown tired of losing money on it as a result of an extended period of industrial action that stopped publication. In the light of success and expansion at The Sun the owners believed that Murdoch could turn the papers around. Harold Evans, editor of the Sunday Times from 1967, was switched to the daily Times, though he stayed only a year amid editorial conflict with Murdoch.

During the 1980s and early 1990s, Murdoch's publications were generally supportive of Britain's Prime Minister Margaret Thatcher. At the end of the Thatcher/Major era, Murdoch switched his support to the Labour Party and its leader, Tony Blair. The closeness of his relationship with Blair and their secret meetings to discuss national policies was to become a political issue in Britain. This later changed, with The Sun, in its English editions, publicly renouncing the ruling Labour government and lending its support to David Cameron's Conservative Party, which soon afterwards formed a coalition government.

In Scotland, where the Conservatives had suffered a complete annihilation in 1997, the paper began to endorse the Scottish National Party (though not yet its flagship policy of independence), which soon after came to form the first-ever outright majority in the proportionally elected Scottish Parliament. Former Prime Minister Gordon Brown's official spokesman said in November 2009 that Brown and Murdoch "were in regular communication" and that "there is nothing unusual in the prime minister talking to Rupert Murdoch".

In 1986, Murdoch introduced electronic production processes to his newspapers in Australia, Britain and the United States. The greater degree of automation led to significant reductions in the number of employees involved in the printing process. In England, the move roused the anger of the print unions, resulting in a long and often violent dispute that played out in Wapping, one of London's docklands areas, where Murdoch had installed the very latest electronic newspaper purpose-built publishing facility in an old warehouse. The bitter Wapping dispute started with the dismissal of 6,000 employees who had gone on strike and resulted in street battles and demonstrations. Many on the political left in Britain alleged the collusion of Margaret Thatcher's Conservative government with Murdoch in the Wapping affair, as a way of damaging the British trade union movement. In 1987, the dismissed workers accepted a settlement of £60 million.

In 1998, Murdoch made an attempt to buy the football club Manchester United F.C., with an offer of £625 million, but this failed. It was the largest amount ever offered for a sports club. It was blocked by the United Kingdom's Competition Commission, which stated that the acquisition would have "hurt competition in the broadcast industry and the quality of British football".

Murdoch's British-based satellite network, Sky Television, incurred massive losses in its early years of operation. As with many of his other business interests, Sky was heavily subsidised by the profits generated by his other holdings, but convinced rival satellite operator British Satellite Broadcasting to accept a merger on his terms in 1990. The merged company, BSkyB, has dominated the British pay-TV market ever since, pursuing direct to home (DTH) satellite broadcasting. By 1996, BSkyB had more than 3.6 million subscribers, triple the number of cable customers in the UK.

Murdoch has a seat on the Strategic Advisory Board of Genie Oil and Gas, having jointly invested with Lord Rothschild in a 5.5% stake in the company which conducted shale gas and oil exploration in Colorado, Mongolia, Israel, and the occupied Golan Heights.

In response to print media's decline and the increasing influence of online journalism during the 2000s, Murdoch proclaimed his support of the micropayments model for obtaining revenue from online news, although this has been criticised by some.

In January 2018, the CMA blocked Murdoch from taking over the remaining 61% of BSkyB he did not already own, over fear of market dominance that could potentialise censorship of the media. His bid for BSkyB was later approved by the CMA as long as he sold Sky News to the Walt Disney Company, which was already set to acquire 21st Century Fox. However, it was Comcast who won control of BSkyB in a blind auction ordered by the CMA. Murdoch ultimately sold his 39% of BSkyB to Comcast.

News Corporation has subsidiaries in the Bahamas, the Cayman Islands, the Channel Islands and the Virgin Islands. From 1986, News Corporation's annual tax bill averaged around seven percent of its profits.

=== Political activities in the United Kingdom ===
In Britain, in the 1980s, Murdoch formed a close alliance with Conservative prime minister Margaret Thatcher. In February 1981, when Murdoch, already owner of The Sun and The News of the World, sought to buy The Times and The Sunday Times, Thatcher's government let his bid pass without referring it to the Monopolies and Mergers Commission, which was usual practice at the time. Although contact between the two before this point had been explicitly denied in an official history of The Times, documents found in Thatcher's archives in 2012 revealed a secret meeting had taken place a month before in which Murdoch briefed Thatcher on his plans for the paper, such as taking on trade unions.

The Sun credited itself with helping her successor John Major to win an unexpected election victory in the 1992 general election, which had been expected to end in a hung parliament or a narrow win for Labour, then led by Neil Kinnock. In the general elections of 1997, 2001 and 2005, Murdoch's papers were either neutral or supported Labour under Tony Blair.

The Labour Party, from when Blair became leader in 1994, had moved from the centre-left to a more centrist position on many economic issues before 1997. Murdoch identifies himself as a libertarian, saying "What does libertarian mean? As much individual responsibility as possible, as little government as possible, as few rules as possible. But I'm not saying it should be taken to the absolute limit."

In a speech he delivered in New York in 2005, Murdoch claimed that Blair described the BBC coverage of the Hurricane Katrina disaster, which was critical of the Bush administration's response, as full of hatred of America.

On 28 June 2006, the BBC reported that Murdoch and News Corporation were considering backing new Conservative leader David Cameron at the next General Election – still up to four years away. In a later interview in July 2006, when he was asked what he thought of the Conservative leader, Murdoch replied "Not much". In a 2009 blog, it was suggested that in the aftermath of the News of the World phone hacking scandal, which might yet have transatlantic implications, Murdoch and News Corporation might have decided to back Cameron. Despite this, there had already been a convergence of interests between the two men over the muting of Britain's communications regulator Ofcom.

In August 2008, Cameron accepted free flights to hold private talks and attend private parties with Murdoch on his yacht, the Rosehearty. Cameron declared in the Commons register of interests he accepted a private plane provided by Murdoch's son-in-law, public relations guru Matthew Freud; Cameron did not reveal his talks with Murdoch. The gift of travel in Freud's Gulfstream IV private jet was valued at around £30,000. Other guests attending the "social events" included the then EU trade commissioner Peter Mandelson, the Russian oligarch Oleg Deripaska and co-chairman of NBC Universal Ben Silverman. The Conservatives did not disclose what was discussed.

In July 2011, it emerged that Cameron had met key executives of Murdoch's News Corporation a total of 26 times during the 14 months that Cameron had served as prime minister up to that point. It was also reported that Murdoch had given Cameron a personal guarantee that there would be no risk attached to hiring Andy Coulson, the former editor of News of the World, as the Conservative Party's communication director in 2007. This was in spite of Coulson having resigned as editor over phone hacking by a reporter. Cameron chose to take Murdoch's advice, despite warnings from the deputy prime minister, Nick Clegg, Lord Ashdown and The Guardian. Coulson resigned his post in 2011 and was later arrested and questioned on allegations of further criminal activity at the News of the World, specifically the phone hacking scandal. As a result of the subsequent trial, Coulson was sentenced to 18 months in jail.

In June 2016, The Sun supported Vote Leave in the United Kingdom European Union membership referendum. Murdoch called the Brexit result "wonderful", comparing the decision to withdraw from the EU to "a prison break ... we're out". Anthony Hilton, economics editor for the Evening Standard but describing a period when he interviewed Murdoch for The Guardian, quoted Murdoch as justifying his Euroscepticism with the words "When I go into Downing Street, they do what I say; when I go to Brussels, they take no notice." Murdoch denied saying this later in a letter to The Guardian.

With some exceptions, The Sun had generally been supportive of the government of Conservative prime minister Boris Johnson. Murdoch and his employees were the media representatives ministers from the Cabinet and Treasury most frequently held meetings during the first two years of Johnson's government. However, newspaper circulation in general including among subsidiaries of News International fell sharply in the United Kingdom during the early 21st century, leading some commentators to suggest that Murdoch was not as influential in British political debate by the early 2020s as he had once been.

== News International phone hacking scandal ==
In July 2011, Murdoch, along with his youngest son James, provided testimony before a British parliamentary committee regarding phone hacking. In the UK, his media empire came under fire, as investigators probed reports of 2011 phone hacking.

On 14 July 2011 the Culture, Media and Sport Committee of the House of Commons served a summons on Murdoch, his son James, and his former CEO Rebekah Brooks to testify before a committee five days later. After an initial refusal, the Murdochs confirmed they would attend, after the committee issued them a summons to Parliament. The day before the committee, the website of the News Corporation publication The Sun was hacked, and a false story was posted on the front page claiming that Murdoch had died. Murdoch described the day of the committee "the most humble day of my life". He argued that since he ran a global business of 53,000 employees and that News of the World was "just 1%" of this, he was not ultimately responsible for what went on at the tabloid. He added that he had not considered resigning, and that he and the other top executives had been completely unaware of the hacking.

On 15 July, Murdoch attended a private meeting in London with the family of Milly Dowler, where he personally apologised for the hacking of their murdered daughter's voicemail by a company he owns. On 16 and 17 July, News International published two full-page apologies in many of Britain's national newspapers. The first apology took the form of a letter, signed by Murdoch, in which he said sorry for the "serious wrongdoing" that occurred. The second was titled "Putting right what's gone wrong", and gave more detail about the steps News International was taking to address the public's concerns. In the wake of the allegations, Murdoch accepted the resignations of Brooks and Les Hinton, head of Dow Jones who was chairman of Murdoch's British newspaper division when some of the abuses happened. They both deny any knowledge of any wrongdoing under their command.

On 27 February 2012, the day after the first issue of The Sun on Sunday was published, Deputy Assistant Commissioner Sue Akers informed the Leveson Inquiry that police are investigating a "network of corrupt officials" as part of their inquiries into phone hacking and police corruption. She said that evidence suggested a "culture of illegal payments" at The Sun and that these payments allegedly made by The Sun were authorised at a senior level.

In testimony on 25 April, Murdoch did not deny the quote attributed to him by his former editor of The Sunday Times, Harold Evans: "I give instructions to my editors all round the world, why shouldn't I in London?" On 1 May 2012, the Culture, Media and Sport Committee issued a report stating that Murdoch was "not a fit person to exercise the stewardship of a major international company".

On 3 July 2013, the Exaro website and Channel 4 News broke the story of a secret recording. This was recorded by The Sun journalists, and in it Murdoch can be heard telling them that the whole investigation was one big fuss over nothing, and that he, or his successors, would take care of any journalists who went to prison. He said: "Why are the police behaving in this way? It's the biggest inquiry ever, over next to nothing."

== Activities in the United States ==
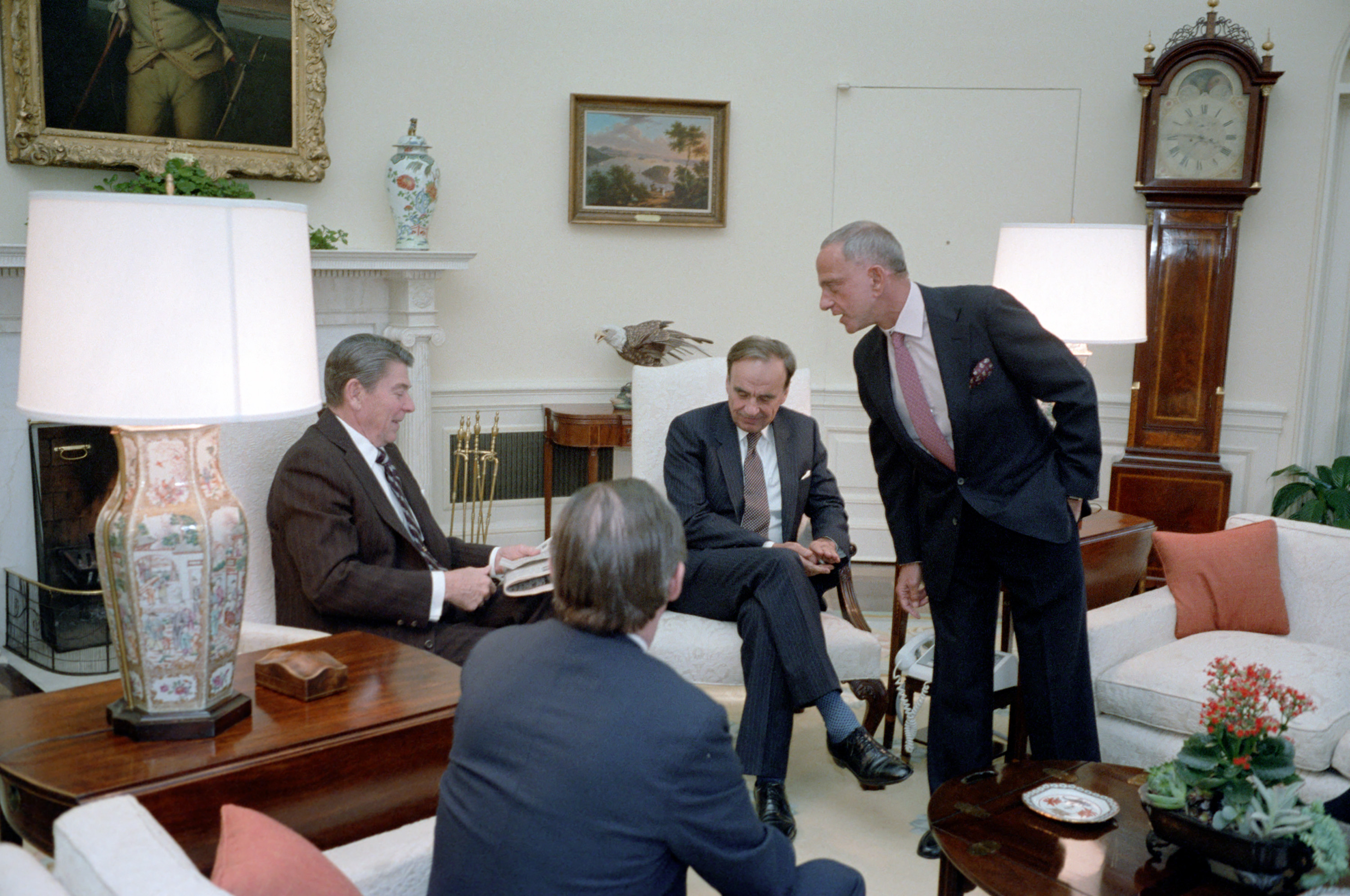
Murdoch (seated center) and Roy Cohn meeting with President Ronald Reagan in the Oval Office in 1983

Murdoch made his first acquisition in the United States in 1973, when he purchased the San Antonio Express-News. In 1974, Murdoch moved to New York City, to expand into the American market; however, he retained interests in Australia and Britain. Soon afterwards, he founded Star, a supermarket tabloid, and in 1976, he purchased the New York Post. On January 3, 1977, Murdoch along with columnist James Brady, founded Page Six, gossip column of the New York Post. On 4 September 1985, Murdoch became a naturalised citizen to satisfy the legal requirement that only American citizens were permitted to own American television stations.

In March 1984, Marvin Davis sold Marc Rich's interest in 20th Century Fox to Murdoch for $250 million due to Rich's trade deals with Iran, which were sanctioned by the US at the time. Davis later backed out of a deal with Murdoch to purchase John Kluge's Metromedia television stations. Rupert Murdoch bought the stations by himself, without Marvin Davis, and later bought out Davis's remaining stake in Fox for $325 million. The six television stations owned by Metromedia formed the nucleus of the Fox Broadcasting Company, founded on 9 October 1986, which later had great success with programs including The Simpsons and The X-Files.

In 1986, Murdoch bought Misty Mountain, a Wallace Neff designed house on Angelo Drive in Beverly Hills. The house was the former residence of Jules C. Stein. Murdoch sold the house to his son James in 2018.

In 1987, Murdoch created his global television special, the World Music Video Awards, a special music ceremony award where winners were chosen by viewers in eight countries. In Australia, during 1987, he bought The Herald and Weekly Times Ltd., the company that his father had once managed. Rupert Murdoch's 20th Century Fox bought out the remaining assets of Four Star Television from Ronald Perelman's Compact Video in 1996. Most of Four Star Television's library of programs are controlled by 20th Century Fox Television today. After Murdoch's numerous buyouts during the buyout era of the eighties, News Corporation had built up financial debts of $7 billion (much from Sky TV in the UK), despite the many assets that were held by NewsCorp. The high levels of debt caused Murdoch to sell many of the American magazine interests he had acquired in the mid-1980s.

In 1993, Murdoch's Fox Network took exclusive coverage of the National Football Conference (NFC) of the National Football League (NFL) from CBS and increased programming to seven days a week. In 1995, Fox became the object of scrutiny from the Federal Communications Commission (FCC), when it was alleged that News Ltd.'s Australian base made Murdoch's ownership of Fox illegal. The FCC ruled in Murdoch's favour, stating that his ownership of Fox was in the best interests of the public. That same year, Murdoch announced a deal with MCI Communications to develop a major news website and magazine, The Weekly Standard. Also that year, News Corporation launched the Foxtel pay television network in Australia in partnership with Telstra.

In 1996, Murdoch decided to enter the cable news market with the Fox News Channel, a 24-hour cable news station. Ratings studies released in 2009 showed that the network was responsible for nine of the top ten programs in the "Cable News" category at that time. Rupert Murdoch and Ted Turner (founder and former owner of CNN) are long-standing rivals. In late 2003, Murdoch acquired a 34% stake in Hughes Electronics, the operator of the largest American satellite TV system, DirecTV, from General Motors for $6 billion (USD). His Fox movie studio had global hits with Titanic and Avatar.

In 2004, Murdoch announced that he was moving News Corporation headquarters from Adelaide, Australia to the United States. Choosing an American domicile was designed to ensure that American fund managers could purchase shares in the company, since many were deciding not to buy shares in non-American companies.

The News Corporation logo

On 20 July 2005, News Corporation bought Intermix Media Inc., which held Myspace, Imagine Games Network and other social networking-themed websites, for US$580 million, making Murdoch a major player in online media concerns. In June 2011, it sold off Myspace for US$35 million. On 11 September 2005, News Corporation announced that it would buy IGN Entertainment for $650 million (USD).

In May 2007, Murdoch made a $5 billion offer to purchase Dow Jones & Company. At the time, the Bancroft family, who had owned Dow Jones & Company for 105 years and controlled 64% of the shares at the time, declined the offer. Later, the Bancroft family confirmed a willingness to consider a sale. Besides Murdoch, the Associated Press reported that supermarket magnate Ron Burkle and Internet entrepreneur Brad Greenspan were among the other interested parties. In 2007, Murdoch acquired Dow Jones & Company, which gave him such publications as The Wall Street Journal, Barron's Magazine, the Far Eastern Economic Review (based in Hong Kong) and SmartMoney.

In June 2014, Murdoch's 21st Century Fox made a bid for Time Warner at $85 per share in stock and cash ($80 billion total) which Time Warner's board of directors turned down in July. Warner's CNN unit would have been sold to ease antitrust issues of the purchase. On 5 August 2014 the company announced it had withdrawn its offer for Time Warner, and said it would spend $6 billion buying back its own shares over the following 12 months.

Murdoch left his post as CEO of 21st Century Fox in 2015 but continued to own the company until it was purchased by Disney in 2019. A number of television broadcasting assets were spun off into the Fox Corporation before the acquisition and are still owned by Murdoch. This includes Fox News, of which Murdoch was acting CEO from 2016 until 2019, following the resignation of Roger Ailes due to accusations of sexual harassment.

Murdoch considered merging News Corp and Fox Corporation, but in January 2023 announced to the board that he had withdrawn the idea, stating that he and his son Lachlan had "determined that a combination [was] not optimal for shareholders of News Corp and FOX" at that time. The Special Committee of the Board of Directors of News Corp that had been set up to investigate the matter was dissolved. In September 2023, Rupert Murdoch retired, and handed over the leadership of his businesses to his eldest son Lachlan.

=== Political activities in the United States ===
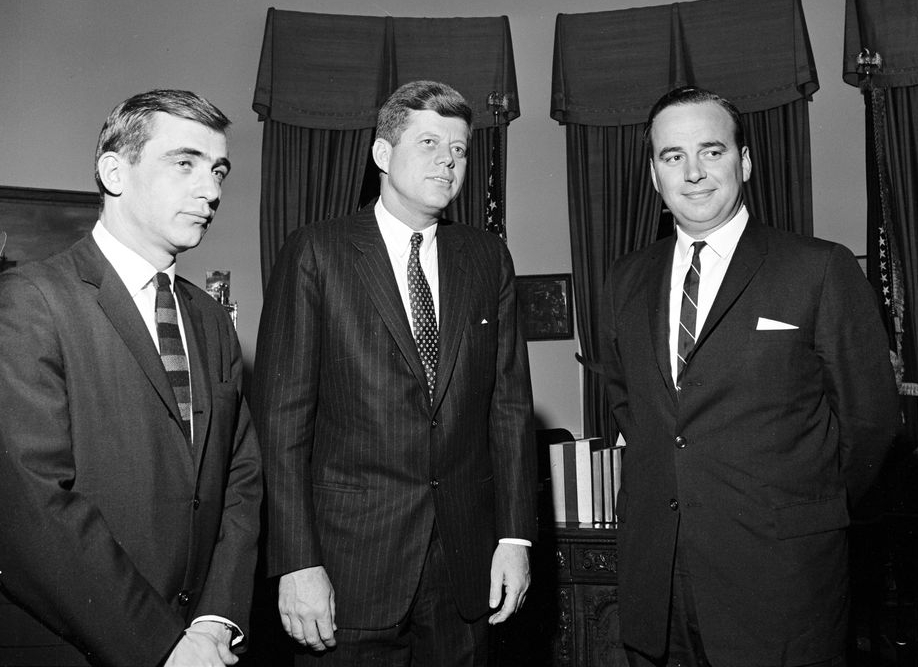
Murdoch (right) with President John F. Kennedy and Zell Rabin in the Oval Office in 1961

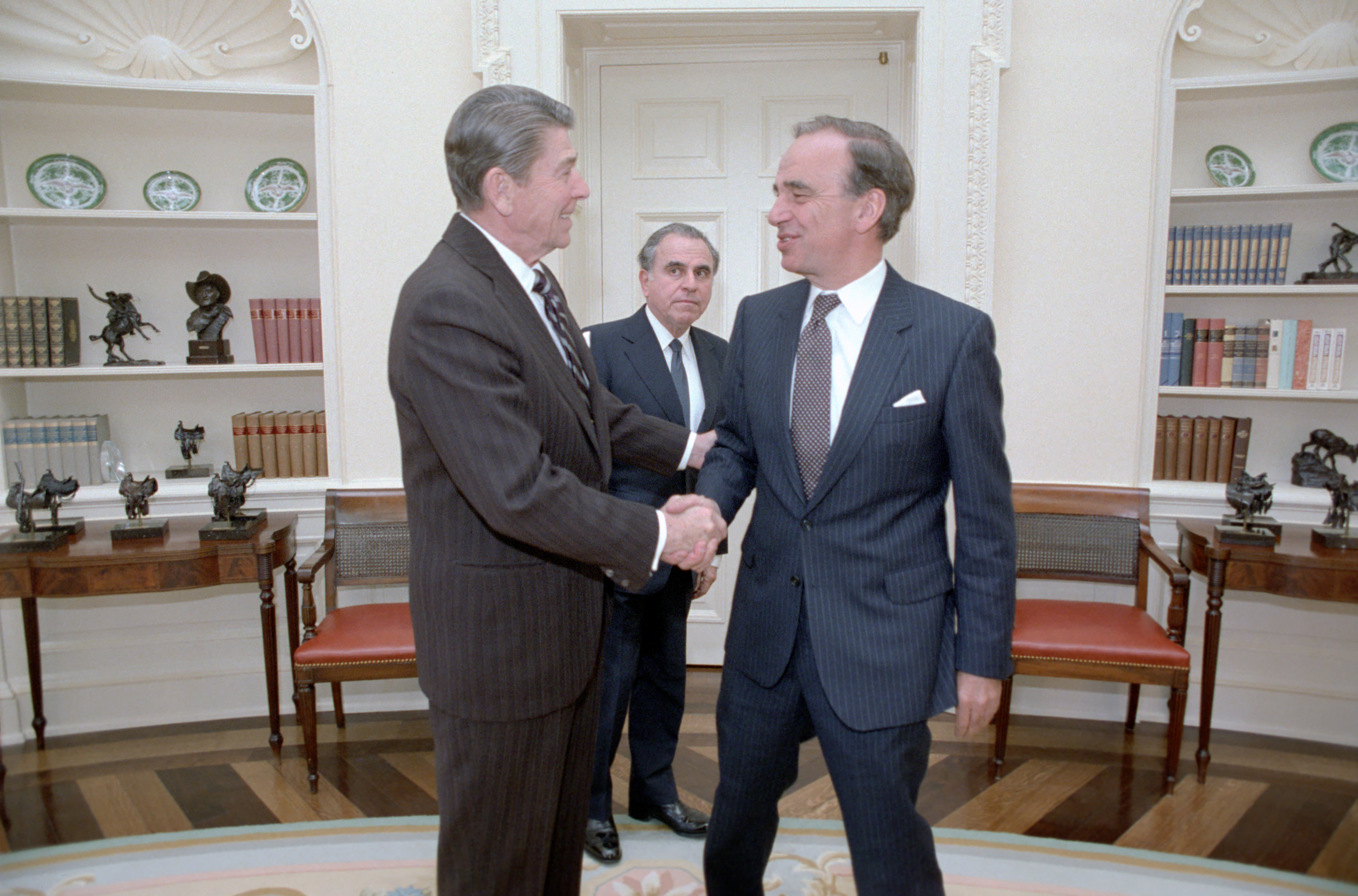
President Ronald Reagan during a meeting with Murdoch in the Oval Office in 1983

McKnight (2010) identifies four characteristics of his media operations: free market ideology; unified positions on matters of public policy; global editorial meetings; and opposition to liberal bias in other public media.

In The New Yorker, Ken Auletta writes that Murdoch's support for Edward I. Koch while he was running for mayor of New York "spilled over onto the news pages of the Post, with the paper regularly publishing glowing stories about Koch and sometimes savage accounts of his four primary opponents."

According to The New York Times, Ronald Reagan's campaign team credited Murdoch and the Post for his victory in New York in the 1980 United States presidential election. Reagan later "waived a prohibition against owning a television station and a newspaper in the same market," allowing Murdoch to continue to control The New York Post and The Boston Herald while expanding into television.

On 8 May 2006, the Financial Times reported that Murdoch would be hosting a fund-raiser for Senator Hillary Clinton's (D-New York) Senate re-election campaign. In a 2008 interview with Walt Mossberg, Murdoch was asked whether he had "anything to do with the New York Post's endorsement of Barack Obama in the democratic primaries". Without hesitating, Murdoch replied, "Yeah. He is a rock star. It's fantastic. I love what he is saying about education. I don't think he will win Florida [...] but he will win in Ohio and the election. I am anxious to meet him. I want to see if he will walk the walk."

In 2010, News Corporation gave US$1 million to the Republican Governors Association and $1 million to the US Chamber of Commerce. Murdoch also served on the board of directors of the libertarian Cato Institute. Murdoch is also a supporter of the Stop Online Piracy Act and Protect Intellectual Property Act.

Murdoch was reported in 2011 as advocating more open immigration policies in western nations generally. In the United States, Murdoch and chief executives from several major corporations, including Hewlett-Packard, Boeing and Disney joined New York City Mayor Michael Bloomberg to form the Partnership for a New American Economy to advocate "for immigration reform – including a path to legal status for all illegal aliens now in the United States". The coalition, reflecting Murdoch and Bloomberg's own views, also advocates significant increases in legal immigration to the United States as a means of boosting America's sluggish economy and lowering unemployment. The Partnership's immigration policy prescriptions are notably similar to those of the Cato Institute and the US Chamber of Commerce — both of which Murdoch has supported in the past.

The Wall Street Journal editorial page has similarly advocated for increased legal immigration, in contrast to the staunch anti-immigration stance of Murdoch's British newspaper, The Sun. On 5 September 2010, Murdoch testified before the House Subcommittee on Immigration, Citizenship, Refugees, Border Security, and International Law Membership on the "Role of Immigration in Strengthening America's Economy". In his testimony, Murdoch called for ending mass deportations and endorsed a "comprehensive immigration reform" plan that would include a pathway to citizenship for all illegal immigrants.

In the 2012 United States presidential election, Murdoch was critical of the competence of Mitt Romney's team but was nonetheless strongly supportive of a Republican victory, tweeting: "Of course I want him [Romney] to win, save us from socialism, etc."

In October 2015, Murdoch stirred controversy when he praised Republican presidential candidate Ben Carson and referenced President Barack Obama, tweeting, "Ben and Candy Carson terrific. What about a real black President who can properly address the racial divide? And much else." After which he apologised, tweeting, "Apologies! No offence meant. Personally find both men charming."

During Donald Trump's term as US President Murdoch showed support for him through the news stories broadcast in his media empire, including on Fox News. In early 2018, Mohammad bin Salman, the crown prince of Saudi Arabia, had an intimate dinner at Murdoch's Bel Air estate in Los Angeles.

Murdoch is a strong supporter of Israel and its domestic policies. In October 2010, the Anti-Defamation League in New York City presented Murdoch with its International Leadership Award "for his stalwart support of Israel and his commitment to promoting respect and speaking out against antisemitism". However, in April 2021, in a letter to Lachlan Murdoch, ADL director Jonathan Greenblatt wrote that it would no longer make such an award to his father. This was in the immediate context of accusations made by the ADL against Fox News presenter Tucker Carlson and his apparent espousal of the White replacement theory.

In 2023, during a defamation lawsuit by Dominion Voting Systems against Fox News, Murdoch acknowledged that some Fox News commentators were endorsing election fraud claims they knew were false. On 18 April 2023, Fox and Dominion settled for $787.5 million.

In July 2025, Murdoch was sued by Trump for $10 billion along with The Wall Street Journal's parent company Dow Jones over an article claiming that a birthday greeting containing Trump's name was sent to Jeffrey Epstein in 2003.

== Activities in Europe ==
Murdoch owns a controlling interest in Sky Italia, a satellite television provider in Italy. Murdoch's business interests in Italy have been a source of contention since they began. In 2009 Murdoch won a media dispute with then Italian prime minister Silvio Berlusconi. A judge ruled the then prime minister's media arm Mediaset prevented News Corporation's Italian unit, Sky Italia, from buying advertisements on its television networks.

== Activities in Asia ==
In November 1986, News Corporation purchased a 35% stake in the South China Morning Post group for about US$105 million. At that time, SCMP group was a stock-listed company, and was owned by HSBC, Hutchison Whampoa and Dow Jones & Company. In December 1986, Dow Jones & Company offered News Corporation to sell about 19% of share it owned of SCMP for US$57.2 million, and, by 1987, News Corporation completed the full takeover. In September 1993, News Corporation have agreed to sell a 34.9% share in SCMP to Robert Kuok's Kerry Media for US$349 million. In 1994, News Corporation sold the remaining 15.1% share in SCMP to MUI Group, disposing the Hong Kong newspaper.

In June 1993, News Corporation attempted to acquire a 22% share in TVB, a terrestrial television broadcaster in Hong Kong, for about $237 million, but Murdoch's company gave up, as the Hong Kong government would not relax the regulation regarding foreign ownership of broadcasting companies.

In 1993, News Corporation acquired Star TV (renamed as Star in 2001), a Hong Kong company headed by Richard Li, from Hutchison Whampoa for $1 billion (Souchou, 2000:28), and subsequently set up offices for it throughout Asia. The deal enabled News International to broadcast from Hong Kong to India, China, Japan, and over thirty other countries in Asia, becoming one of the biggest satellite television networks in the east; however, the deal did not work out as Murdoch had planned because the Chinese government placed restrictions on it that prevented it from reaching most of China.

In 2009, News Corporation reorganised Star; a few of these arrangements were that the original company's operations in East Asia, Southeast Asia and the Middle East were integrated into Fox International Channels, and Star India was spun-off (but still within News Corporation).

== Succession court case (2024) ==
As of December 2024, the whole Murdoch family is involved in a court case in Reno, Nevada, in which James, his sister Elisabeth and half-sister Prudence are challenging their father's bid to amend the family trust to ensure that his eldest son, Lachlan, retains control of News Corp and Fox Corp, rather than benefiting all of his six children, as is specified in the "irrevocable" terms of the trust. According to The New York Times, Murdoch Senior wants his companies to remain politically conservative, and sees his other children as too politically liberal.

The irrevocable family trust was set up after Rupert and Anna Murdoch's divorce in 1999, to hold the family's 28.5% stake in News Corp. It relates only to the children born before then, giving them equal say in the fate of the business after Rupert's death. Chloe and Grace Murdoch, Rupert's children with third wife Wendi Deng, will have no say in the business, although will share the stock proceeds. The case follows Rupert's attempt to change the trust in 2023, and the Nevada probate commissioner's finding that he was allowed to amend the trust "if he is able to show he is acting in good faith and for the sole benefit of his heirs". Rupert Murdoch is arguing interference by the other siblings would cause a financial loss to Fox, and therefore "in their own best interests if they have their votes taken away from them". He argues that preserving the outlet's conservative editorial stance against interference by the more politically moderate siblings would better protect its commercial value.

The case has led to the three children becoming estranged from their father, with none of them attending his wedding to his fifth wife, Elena Zhukova, in June 2024.

On 9 September 2025, News Corp announced changes to the structure of the trust which controls the family's ownership of the company and Fox News. As part of the changes, a partial share sale by the family trust was agreed, reported to be worth $3.3 billion, for Prudence MacLeod, Elisabeth Murdoch and James Murdoch's shares in News Corp and Fox News. All three siblings will cease to be beneficiaries of any holdings in News Corp and Fox and will no longer have any voting rights. As part of the new structure, Murdoch's eldest son and chairman of News Corp, Lachlan Murdoch, will assume full control of the family trust which owns both companies, including full voting rights. It was announced that Murdoch's younger children, Grace Murdoch and Chloe Murdoch, will join as beneficiaries of the trust with no voting rights.

== Personal life ==
=== Residence ===
In 2003, Murdoch bought Rosehearty, an 11 bedroom home on a 5-acre waterfront estate in Centre Island, New York. In May 2013, he purchased the Moraga Estate, an estate, vineyard and winery in Bel Air, Los Angeles, California. In 2019, Murdoch and his new wife Jerry Hall purchased Holmwood, an 18th-century house and estate in the English village of Binfield Heath, some 4 miles (6.4 km) north-east of Reading.

In late 2020, during the COVID-19 pandemic, it was reported that Murdoch and Hall had been isolating in their Binfield Heath home for much of the year. He received his first COVID-19 vaccine in nearby Henley-on-Thames on 16 December.

=== Marriages ===
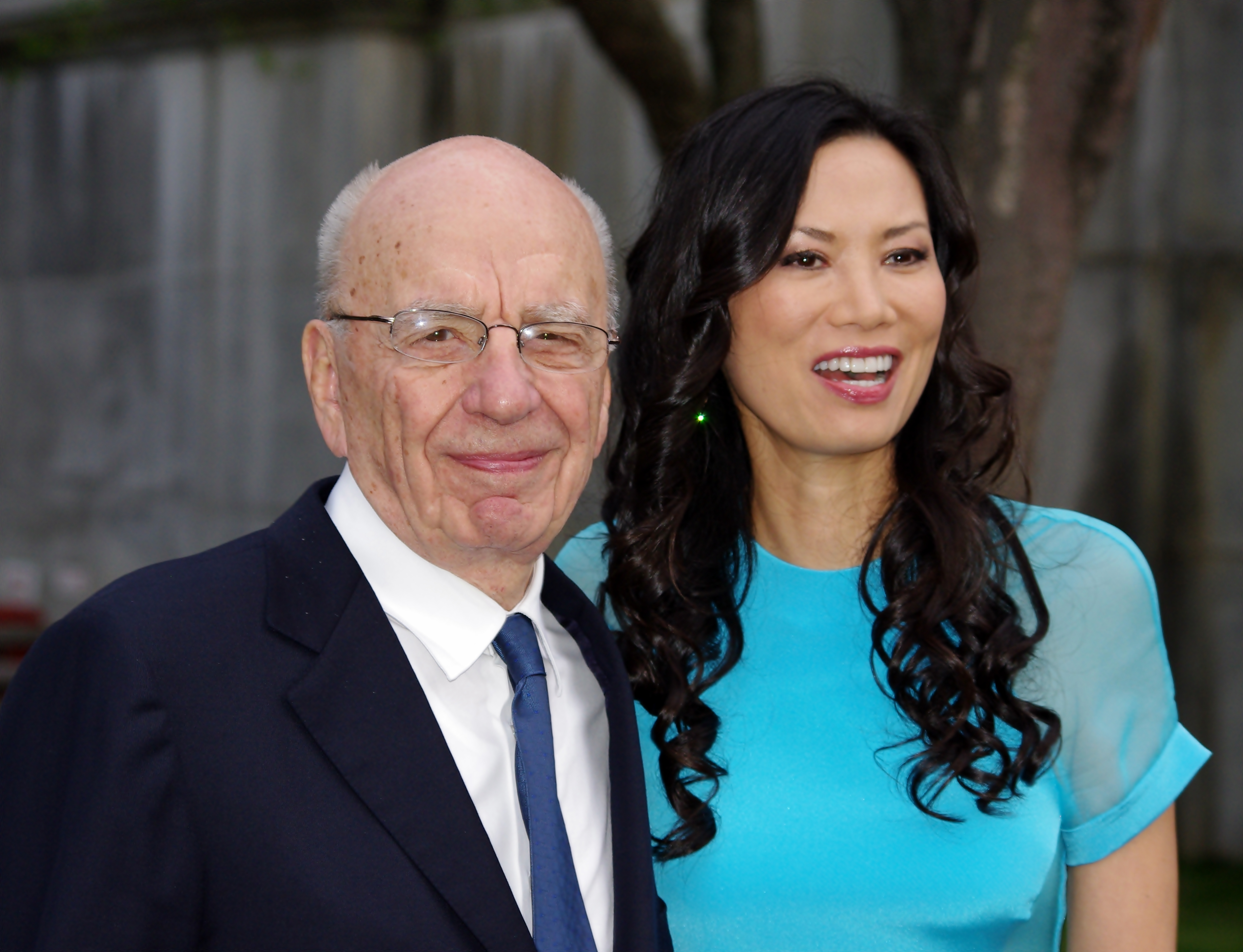
Murdoch with his third wife, Wendi, in 2011

In 1956, Murdoch married Patricia Booker, a former shop assistant and flight attendant from Melbourne; the couple had their only child, Prudence, in 1958. They divorced in 1967.

In 1967, Murdoch married Anna Torv, a Scottish-born cadet journalist working for his Sydney newspaper The Daily Mirror. In January 1998, three months before the announcement of his separation from Anna, a Roman Catholic, Murdoch was made a Knight Commander of the Order of Saint Gregory the Great (KSG), a papal honour awarded by Pope John Paul II. While Murdoch would often attend Mass with Torv, he never converted to Catholicism. Torv and Murdoch had three children: Elisabeth Murdoch (born in Sydney, Australia on 22 August 1968), Lachlan Murdoch (born in London, UK on 8 September 1971), and James Murdoch, (born in London on 13 December 1972). Murdoch's companies published two novels by his wife: Family Business (1988) and Coming to Terms (1991). They divorced in June 1999. Anna Murdoch received a settlement of US$1.2 billion in assets.

On 25 June 1999, 17 days after divorcing his second wife, Murdoch, then aged 68, married Chinese-born Wendi Deng. She was 30, a recent Yale School of Management graduate, and a newly appointed vice-president of his STAR TV. Murdoch had two daughters with her: Grace (born 2001) and Chloe (born 2003). Near the end of his marriage to Wendi, hearsay concerning a link with Chinese intelligence (which was later proven to be unfounded) became problematic to their relationship. On 13 June 2013, a News Corporation spokesperson confirmed that Murdoch filed for divorce from Deng in New York City, US. According to the spokesman, the marriage had been irretrievably broken for more than six months. Murdoch also ended his long-standing friendship with Tony Blair after suspecting him of having an affair with Deng while they were still married.

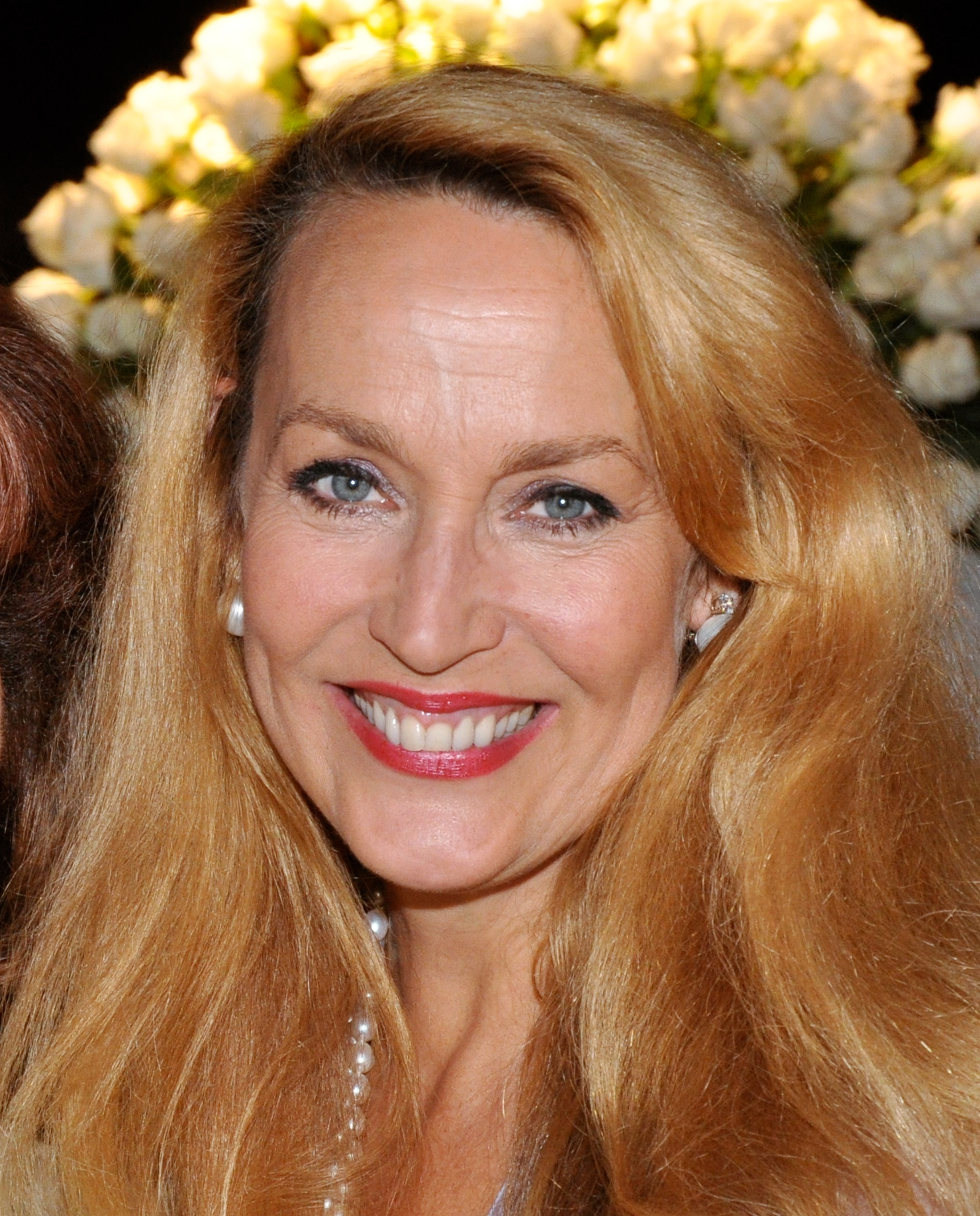
Jerry Hall, Murdoch's fourth wife, whom he married in March 2016, photographed in 2009

On 11 January 2016, Murdoch announced his engagement to former model Jerry Hall in a notice in The Times newspaper. On 4 March 2016, Murdoch, a week short of his 85th birthday, and 59-year-old Hall were married in London, at St Bride's, Fleet Street with a reception at Spencer House; this was Murdoch's fourth marriage. In June 2022, The New York Times reported that Murdoch and Hall were set to divorce, citing two anonymous sources. Hall filed for divorce on 1 July 2022 citing irreconcilable differences; the divorce was finalised in August 2022.

During Saint Patrick's Day celebrations in 2023, Murdoch, who is quarter Irish, proposed to his partner, Ann Lesley Smith. The engaged couple first met at an event in September 2022. In April 2023, two weeks after the couple were engaged, Murdoch suddenly called off the engagement. The split was said to be caused by Murdoch's discomfort with Smith's religious views and her infatuation with Fox News host Tucker Carlson, reportedly referring to him as "a messenger from God". Carlson was fired from Fox News three weeks later.

Murdoch became engaged again in March 2024, to retired Russian molecular biologist Elena Zhukova, who is also the ex-wife of Russian businessman Alexander Zhukov. Their wedding was held in June 2024 at Murdoch's estate in California. Murdoch was 93 and Zhukova 67 years old. Through the marriage he became stepfather to Dasha Zhukova, ex-wife of Roman Abramovich.

=== Children ===
Murdoch has six children and 13 grandchildren. His eldest child, Prudence MacLeod, was appointed on 28 January 2011 to the board of Times Newspapers Ltd, part of News International, which publishes The Times and The Sunday Times. Murdoch's elder son Lachlan, formerly the deputy chief operating officer at News Corp and publisher of the New York Post, was Murdoch's heir apparent before resigning from his executive posts at the global media company at the end of July 2005. Lachlan's departure left James Murdoch, chief executive of the satellite television service British Sky Broadcasting since November 2003 as the only Murdoch son still directly involved with the company's operations, though Lachlan has agreed to remain on the News Corp's board.

After graduating from Vassar College and marrying classmate Elkin Kwesi Pianim, the son of Ghanaian financial and political mogul Kwame Pianim, in 1993, Murdoch's daughter Elisabeth and her husband purchased a pair of NBC-affiliate television stations in California, KSBW and KSBY, with a $35 million loan provided by her father. By quickly re-organising and re-selling them at a $12 million profit in 1995, Elisabeth emerged as an unexpected rival to her brothers for the eventual leadership of the publishing dynasty. But, after divorcing Pianim in 1998 and quarrelling publicly with her assigned mentor Sam Chisholm at BSkyB, she struck out on her own as a television and film producer in London. She has since enjoyed independent success, in conjunction with her second husband, Matthew Freud, the great-grandson of Sigmund Freud, whom she met in 1997 and married in 2001.

Until September 2023, it was not known how long Murdoch would remain as News Corporation's CEO. For a while the American cable television entrepreneur John Malone was the second-largest voting shareholder in News Corporation after Murdoch himself, potentially undermining the family's control. In 2007, the company announced that it would sell certain assets and give cash to Malone's company in exchange for its stock. In 2007, the company issued Murdoch's older children voting stock.

Murdoch has two children with Wendi Deng: Grace (b. New York, November 2001) and Chloe (b. New York, July 2003). It was revealed in September 2011 that Tony Blair is Grace's godfather. There is reported to be tension between Murdoch and his oldest children over the terms of a trust holding the family's 28.5% stake in News Corporation, estimated in 2005 to be worth about $6.1 billion. Under the trust, his children by Wendi Deng share in the proceeds of the stock but have no voting privileges or control of the stock. Voting rights in the stock are divided 50/50 between Murdoch on the one side and his children of his first two marriages. Murdoch's voting privileges are not transferable but will expire upon his death and the stock will then be controlled solely by his children from the prior marriages, although their half-siblings will continue to derive their share of income from it. It is Murdoch's stated desire to have his children by Deng given a measure of control over the stock proportional to their financial interest in it. It does not appear that he has any strong legal grounds to contest the present arrangement, and both ex-wife Anna and their three children are said to be strongly resistant to any such change.

== In the arts and media ==
=== Film and television ===
In 1999, the Ted Turner-owned TBS channel aired an original sitcom, The Chimp Channel. This featured an all-simian cast and the role of an Australian TV veteran named Harry Waller. The character is described as "a self-made gazillionaire with business interests in all sorts of fields. He owns newspapers, hotel chains, sports franchises and genetic technologies, as well as everyone's favourite cable TV channel, The Chimp Channel". Waller is thought to be a parody of Murdoch, a long-time rival of Turner.

In 2004, the movie Outfoxed: Rupert Murdoch's War on Journalism included many interviews accusing Fox News of pressuring reporters to report only one side of news stories, in order to influence viewers' political opinions.

In 2012, the satirical TV movie Hacks broadcast on the UK's Channel 4, made obvious comparisons with Murdoch using the fictional character Stanhope Feast, portrayed by Michael Kitchen, as well as other central figures in the phone hacking scandal.

The 2013 film Anchorman 2: The Legend Continues features an Australian character inspired by Rupert Murdoch who owns a cable news television channel.

Murdoch was part of the inspiration for Logan Roy, the protagonist of TV show Succession (2018–2023), who is portrayed by Brian Cox.

Murdoch has also been played by the following people in films and TV series:

- Barry Humphries in the TV mini-series Selling Hitler (1991)
- Hugh Laurie in a parody of It's a Wonderful Life in the TV show A Bit of Fry & Laurie (1990s)
- Paul Elder in the telemovie The Late Shift (1996)
- Ben Mendelsohn in the film Black and White (2002)
- Himself on The Simpsons, first in "Sunday, Cruddy Sunday" and later in "Judge Me Tender" (2010)
- Patrick Brammall in the TV mini-series Power Games: The Packer–Murdoch War (2013)
- Ben Miller in two British comedy TV series: Tracey Ullman's Show (2016) and Tracey Breaks the News (2017)
- Simon McBurney in the mini-series The Loudest Voice (2019)
- Malcolm McDowell in Bombshell (2019)
- Steve Pemberton in the 2025 ITV drama about the News International phone hacking scandal, The Hack.
- Guy Pearce in the upcoming film Ink, itself based on the stage play of the same name.

=== Books ===
Murdoch and rival newspaper and publishing magnate Robert Maxwell are thinly fictionalised as "Keith Townsend" and "Richard Armstrong" in The Fourth Estate (1996) by British novelist and former MP Jeffrey Archer.

In the novel Dunbar (2017) by Edward St Aubyn the eponymous lead character is at least partly inspired by Murdoch.

Young Rupert: The Making of the Murdoch Empire (2023), by Walter Marsh, has been praised for the high quality of its research. It focuses on Murdoch as a child and young man, in particular his early career at The News in Adelaide and his relationship with the editor-in-chief Rohan Rivett. Several commenters on the book remarked on Murdoch's embrace of socialism in his early years.

=== Music ===
Towards the end of his touring career, Eagles drummer and lead singer Don Henley would often dedicate his 1982 hit "Dirty Laundry" to Murdoch and Bill O'Reilly.

Australian psychedelic rock band King Gizzard & the Lizard Wizard wrote the track "Evilest Man" about Murdoch, for their 2022 album Omnium Gatherum.

== Influence, wealth, and reputation ==
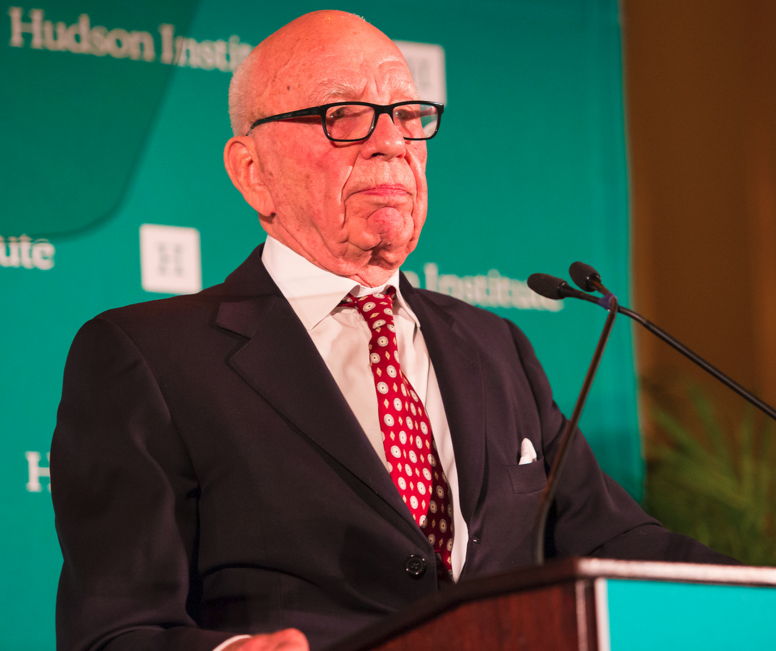
Murdoch accepting the Hudson Institute's Global Leadership Award, November 2015

=== Forbes rankings ===
In 2014, Forbes estimated Rupert Murdoch's wealth at US$13.7 billion.

In 2016, Forbes ranked "Rupert Murdoch & Family" as the 35th most powerful person in the world.

According to Forbes' 2017 real-time list of world's billionaires, Murdoch was the 34th richest person in the US and the 96th richest person in the world, with a net worth of US$13.1 billion as of February 2017.

In 2019, the Murdoch family were ranked 52nd in the Forbes' annual list of the world's billionaires.

As per Forbes list of The Richest People In The World, dated 8 March 2024, Murdoch and family were ranked #100 with a net worth of $19.5 Billion.

=== Other assessments and investigations ===
In August 2013, Terry Flew, Professor of Media and Communications at Queensland University of Technology, wrote an article for the Conversation publication in which he investigated a claim by former Australian prime minister Kevin Rudd that Murdoch owned 70% of Australian newspapers in 2011. Flew's article showed that News Corp Australia owned 23% of the nation's newspapers in 2011, according to the Finkelstein Review of Media and Media Regulation, but, at the time of the article, the corporation's titles accounted for 59% of the sales of all daily newspapers, with weekly sales of 17.3 million copies.

In connection with Murdoch's testimony to the Leveson Inquiry "into the ethics of the British press", editor of Newsweek International, Tunku Varadarajan, referred to him as "the man whose name is synonymous with unethical newspapers".

News Corp papers were accused of supporting the campaign of the Australian Liberal government and influencing public opinion during the 2013 federal election. Following the announcement of the Liberal Party victory at the polls, Murdoch tweeted "Aust. election public sick of public sector workers and phony welfare scroungers sucking life out of economy. Other nations to follow in time."

In November 2015, former Australian prime minister Tony Abbott said that Murdoch "arguably has had more impact on the wider world than any other living Australian".

In late 2015, The Wall Street Journal journalist John Carreyrou began a series of investigative articles on Theranos, the blood-testing start-up founded by Elizabeth Holmes, that questioned its claim to be able to run a wide range of lab tests from a tiny sample of blood from a finger prick. Holmes had turned to Murdoch, whose media empire includes Carreyrou's employer, The Wall Street Journal, to kill the story. Murdoch, who became the biggest investor in Theranos in 2015 as a result of his $125 million injection, refused the request from Holmes saying that "he trusted the paper's editors to handle the matter fairly."

In November 2021, Murdoch accused, without providing evidence, Google and Facebook of stifling conservative viewpoints on its platforms, and called for "substantial reform" and openness in the digital ad supply chain.

== See also ==
- Murdoch family
- List of assets owned by Fox Corporation
- List of assets owned by News Corp
  - Metropolitan police role in phone hacking scandal
  - Phone hacking scandal reference lists
- The Rise of the Murdoch Dynasty (BBC Two documentary)
