= Wendi Deng Murdoch =

Chinese-American businesswoman (born 1968)

Wendi Murdoch 邓文迪
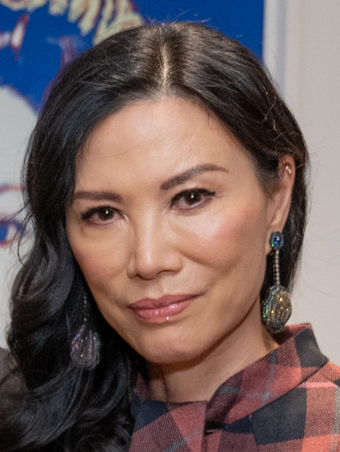
- Wendi Deng in 2024
- Born: Deng Wen'ge (邓文革); December 5, 1968 (age 57); Jinan, Shandong, China
- Education: Guangzhou Medical University (withdrew); California State University, Northridge (BA); Yale University (MBA)
- Spouses: Jake Cherry (m. 1990; div. 1993) Rupert Murdoch (m. 1999; div. 2013)
- Children: 2
- Parents: Deng Dehui (father); Liu Xueqin (mother)

Chinese name
- Simplified Chinese: 邓文迪
- Traditional Chinese: 鄧文迪
Transcriptions
Standard Mandarin
- Hanyu Pinyin: Dèng Wéndí
- Website: www.wendimurdoch.com

Wendi Deng Murdoch (Chinese: 邓文迪; pinyin: Dèng Wéndí; born Deng Wen'ge; December 5, 1968) is a Chinese-born American entrepreneur and socialite. She was the third wife of media mogul Rupert Murdoch from 1999 until 2013.

== Early life and education ==
Wendi Deng was born in Jinan, Shandong, and raised in Xuzhou, Jiangsu. Her birth name was Deng Wen'ge, (邓文革), meaning "Cultural Revolution". She has two older sisters, and a brother, and both of her parents were engineers. When she was a teen she changed her given name to "Wendi".

She attended Xuzhou First Secondary School (a.k.a. Xuzhou No.1 Middle School). She became a competitive volleyball player. While she was in high school, her father relocated to Guangzhou, where he was a factory director at the People's Machinery Works; she and her family remained in Xuzhou until they joined their father a short time later. In 1985, she was enrolled at the Guangzhou Medical College.

In 1988, she left medical school and went to the United States on a study permit. She enrolled at California State University, Northridge, where she studied economics and was among the top scoring students. She graduated with a BA in economics from California State University, Northridge, and earned an MBA from Yale University.

== Career and public profile ==
Upon graduation from Yale in 1996, Deng met Bruce Churchill. At that time, Churchill oversaw finance and corporate development at the Fox TV branch in Los Angeles. He offered Deng an internship at News Corp subsidiary Star TV in Hong Kong, which developed into a full-time junior executive position. Though a junior employee, she took a role in working to plan Star TV's operations in Hong Kong and mainland China and helped to build up Chinese distribution for Star's Channel V music channel. Within one year, she became a vice president. Additionally, she investigated interactive TV opportunities for News Digital Systems.

Deng was an advisor for MySpace's China operation, prior to the company's sale to Specific Media in June 2011. She led the Murdoch family's Chinese internet investments and helped form business links with China for high-speed video and internet access.

In 2009, Deng co-founded the online platform Artsy with Carter Cleveland and Dasha Zhukova, which has since become one of the top online places for buying, viewing and learning about art. Other investors include Peter Thiel, François Pinault and Eric Schmidt.

In 2011, Deng co-produced her first film with Florence Sloan, Snow Flower and the Secret Fan, a movie about two footbound children in Qing dynasty China, directed by Wayne Wang. The film won the Golden Angel Award at the Chinese American Film Festival. She also produced the Netflix documentary Sky Ladder directed by Academy Award-winning Kevin MacDonald, showcasing the art of Cai Guo-Qiang. The film premiered in January 2016 at the Sundance Film Festival. Sotheby's hosted a private reception and screening of the film in October 2016 before the film's Netflix debut.

Deng is a collector of Chinese contemporary art. She has also invested in tech start-ups including Oscar Health, Snapchat, Uber, and Warby Parker.

== Personal life ==
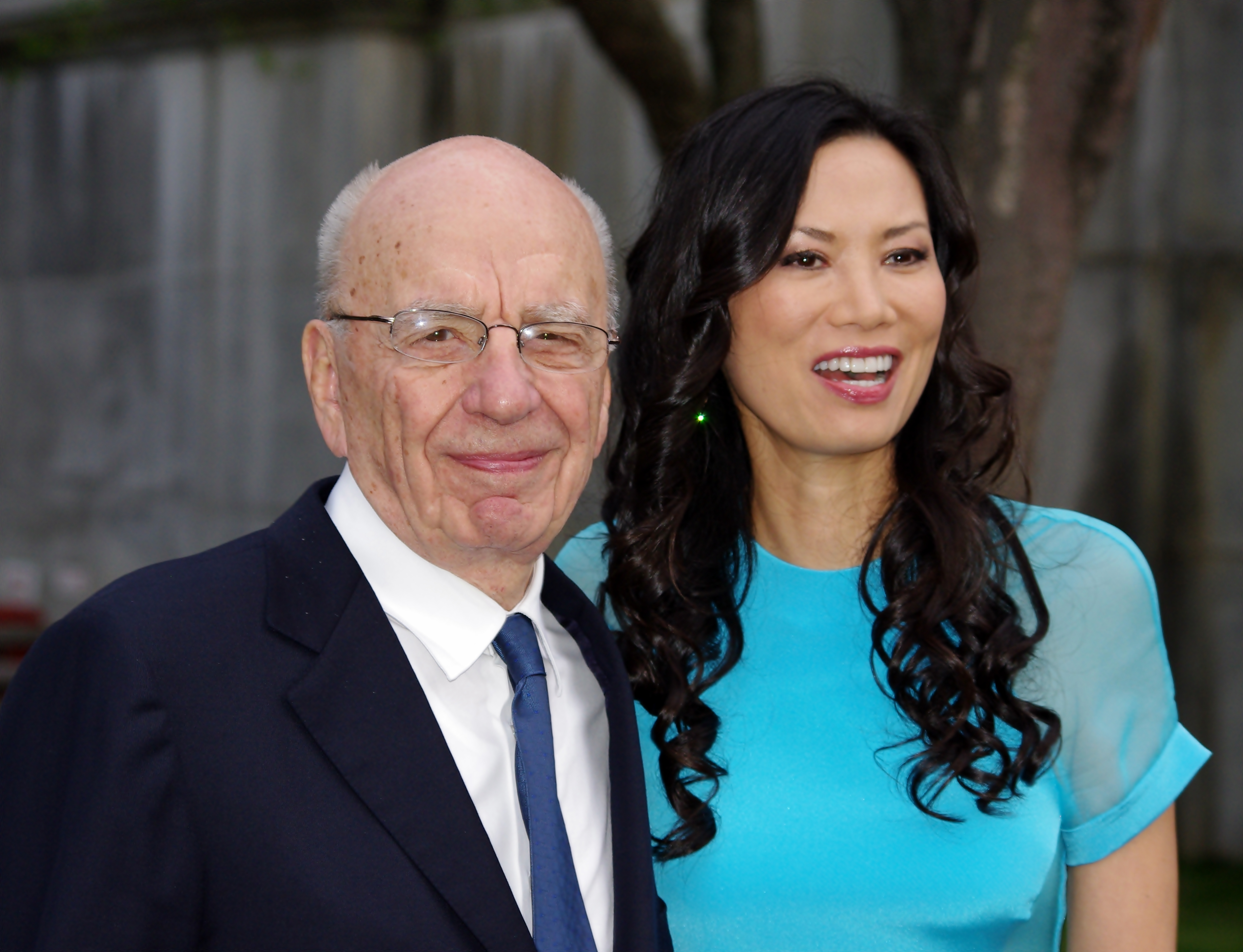
Rupert and Deng in 2011

Jake and Joyce Cherry hosted Deng in their home during her studies in the United States. Later, Jake Cherry left his wife, and married Deng in 1990. While married to Cherry, Deng obtained a green card. They divorced after 2 years and 7 months of marriage. Cherry later said that they stayed together for only four to five months when he learned that Deng was spending time with David Wolf, a man closer to her age.

In 1997, she met media mogul Rupert Murdoch, who is 37 years her senior, while working as an executive at the Murdoch-owned Star TV in Hong Kong. They married in 1999 on board his yacht Morning Glory, less than three weeks after the finalization of his divorce from his second wife, Anna Murdoch (née Torv). The couple had two daughters: Grace (born 2001) and Chloe (born 2003). Tony Blair is Grace Murdoch's godfather. In June 2013, Rupert Murdoch filed for divorce from Deng, citing irreconcilable differences.

On July 19, 2011, Deng counterattacked Jonathan May-Bowles (comedian Jonnie Marbles) after he threw a pie at her husband Rupert Murdoch while he was giving testimony before a British parliamentary committee considering the News International phone hacking scandal. May-Bowles was subsequently sentenced to six weeks' imprisonment.

In February 2014, The Daily Telegraph and Vanity Fair alleged that Deng might have had an affair with former UK Prime Minister Tony Blair. An article in The Economist claimed that as a result of Rupert Murdoch's suspicion that Blair had an affair with his wife, he ended his long-standing association with Blair in 2014.

In early 2018, The Wall Street Journal published a story suggesting that Jared Kushner and Ivanka Trump, longtime friends of Deng, were warned by US intelligence agencies that she may be using her relationship with them to further the goals of the Chinese government. Michael Wolff, author of Fire and Fury: Inside the Trump White House, posited that the article was an attempt by Rupert Murdoch, owner of The Wall Street Journal, to spread the idea that "Wendi is a Chinese spy" in the aftermath of their acrimonious divorce.

As of 2016, Deng was living in New York City with her two daughters.
