= Murdoch family =

Media family

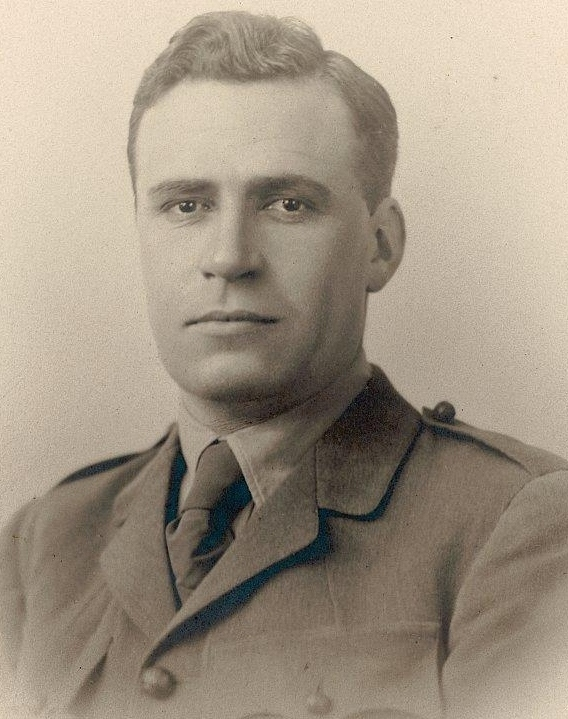
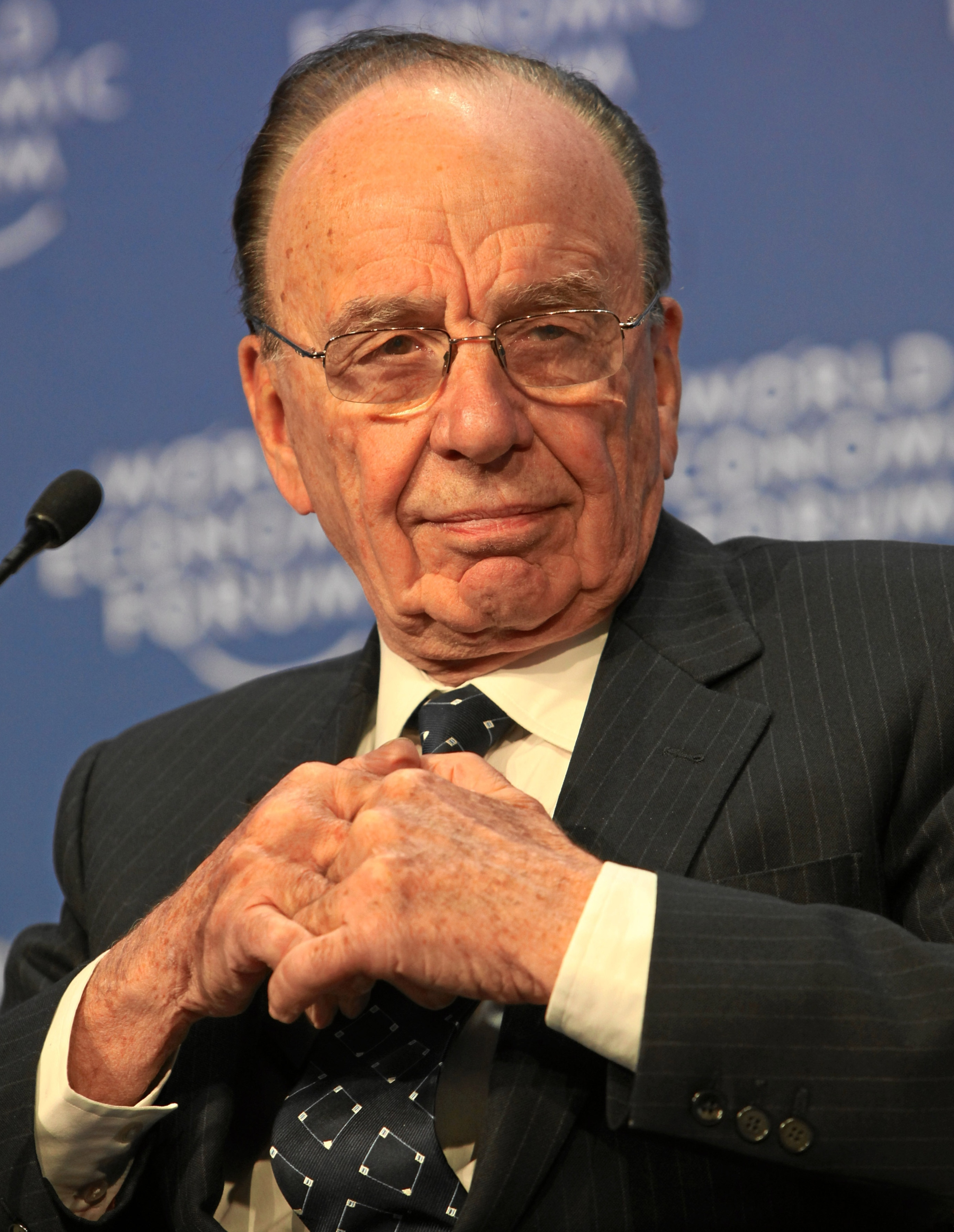
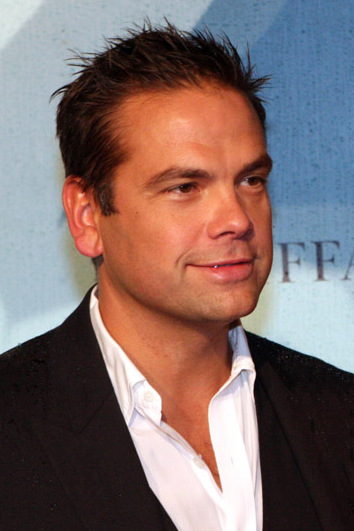
- Keith Murdoch Rupert Murdoch Lachlan Murdoch
- Current region: Australia; United Kingdom; United States
- Origin: Pitsligo, Aberdeenshire, Scotland
- Connected members: Dame Elisabeth Murdoch (née Greene; 1909–2012); Matthew Freud; Sarah Murdoch (née O'Hare); Wendy Deng Murdoch; Jerry Hall
- Connected families: Freud family

Members of the Murdoch family are prominent international media magnates and media tycoons with roots in Australia and the United Kingdom, along with their media assets in the United States. Some members have also been prominent in the arts, clergy, and military.

Five generations of the family are descended from two Scottish immigrants to Australia: the Reverend James Murdoch (1818–1884), a minister of the Free Church of Scotland and his wife Helen, née Garden (1826–1905). Both were from the Pitsligo area of Aberdeenshire and migrated to the Colony of Victoria in 1884.

Media mogul Rupert Murdoch is known for being one of the founders and the owner of the world's former largest media company News Corporation, a company that was spun-off in mid 2013 splitting its entertainment assets to 21st Century Fox and its media publishing assets to form the new News Corp. Currently the Murdochs still have the controlling interest in the remains of the acquisition of 21st Century Fox by the Walt Disney Company that was spun-off to Fox Corporation, and still remain as top executives of News Corp.

== History ==
Prof. Walter Murdoch (left) and family at Point Lonsdale, Victoria, in 1910. His wife, Violet (née Hughston) is upper centre. Their daughter, Catherine – as Catherine King a prominent broadcaster – is centre right and son William (Will) Murdoch is on the right.

=== First generation ===
Helen and the Rev. James Murdoch had 14 children.

Their eldest child, the Rev. Patrick Murdoch was born in Pitsligo and raised at Rosehearty, Aberdeenshire. He was ordained at Cruden, Aberdeenshire, where he also married Annie Brown (in 1882). At the age of 34, Murdoch emigrated with his wife and parents to Victoria. He was prominent there as a Presbyterian minister and published several books on theology. Two of Patrick and Annie Murdoch's six children achieved prominence, Sir Keith Murdoch and Ivon George Murdoch.

Nora Curle Smith, née Murdoch, was born in Pitsligo and married David Curle Smith (1859–1922). A pioneering electrical engineer, David Curle Smith was in charge of the municipal electricity supply at Kalgoorlie, Western Australia during the early 20th century, invented a pioneering electric stove, which he patented in 1906. To promote the stove, Nora Curle Smith wrote the world's first cookbook for electric stoves, which featured 161 recipes and operating instructions for the stove, under the name "H. Nora Curle Smith": Thermo-Electrical Cooking Made Easy (1907; reprinted 2011).

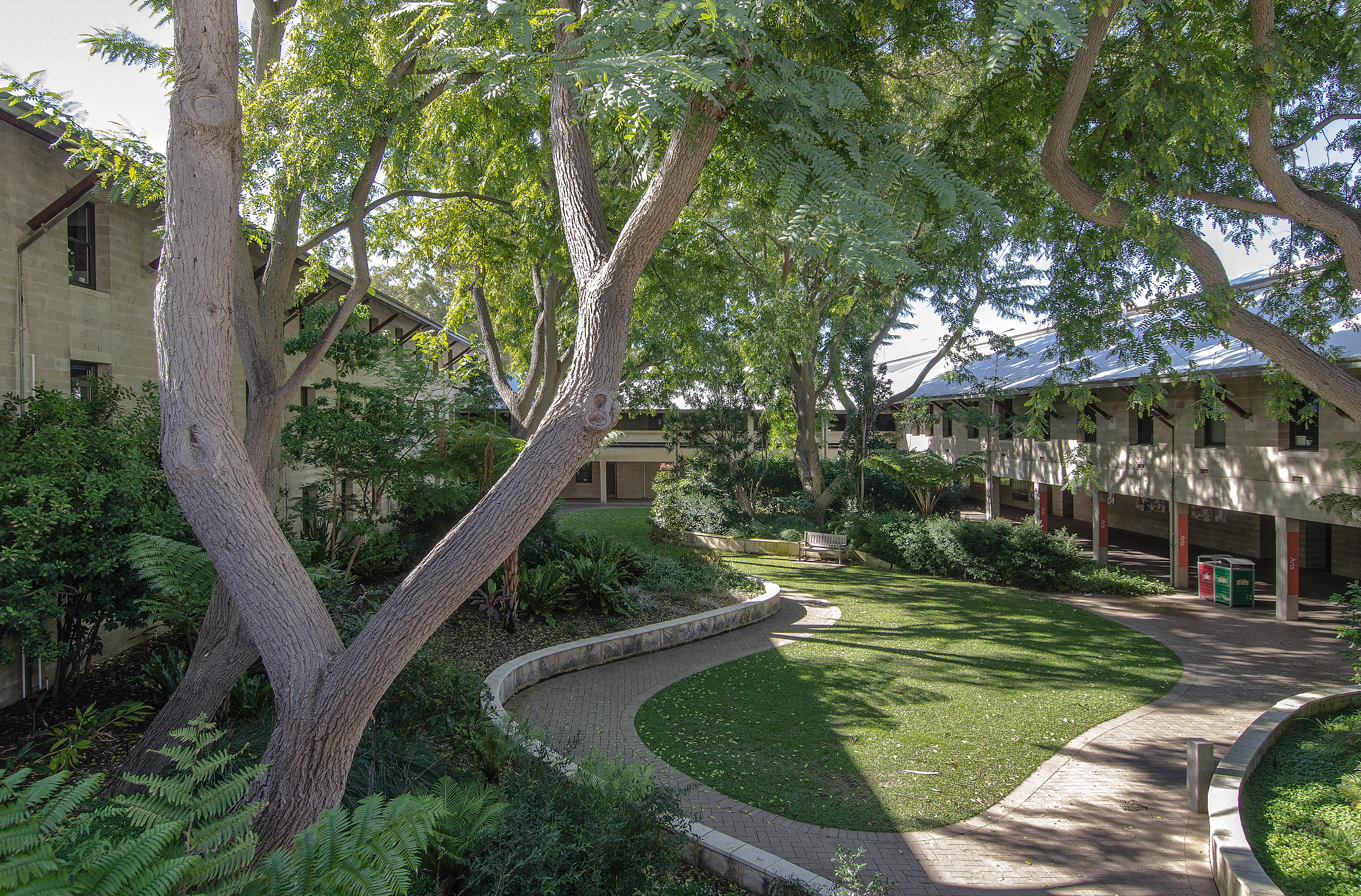
Part of the main campus of Murdoch University, in Murdoch, a suburb of Perth, Western Australia. Both the university and suburb are named after Sir Walter Murdoch.

Sir Walter Murdoch, who was born at Rosehearty, was a prominent Australian academic and essayist. He married Violet Catherine Hughston in 1897. Murdoch published his first essay, "The new school of Australian poets", in 1899 and for many years he wrote a weekly column titled "Books and Men" for the Melbourne Argus (under the pen name of "Elzevir"). His academic career began with an appointment in 1904 as an assistant lecturer in English at Melbourne University. In 1913, he was appointed founding Professor of English at the University of Western Australia (UWA). During the 1920s, his essays were syndicated across Australia through the Herald & Weekly Times newspaper group run by his nephew, Sir Keith Murdoch (see below). Collections of Walter Murdoch's writings were published in book form from the 1930s onward. He was appointed a Companion of the Order of St Michael & St George (CMG) in 1939, served as Chancellor of UWA in 1943–48 and was made a Professor Emeritus upon his retirement. Violet Murdoch died in 1952 and 10 years later Murdoch remarried, to Barbara Marshall Cameron. He was appointed a Knight Commander of the Order of St Michael & St George (KCMG) in 1964.

In Perth, Sir Walter Murdoch is commemorated by the names of both Murdoch University and the suburb surrounding its main campus: Murdoch.

=== Second generation ===
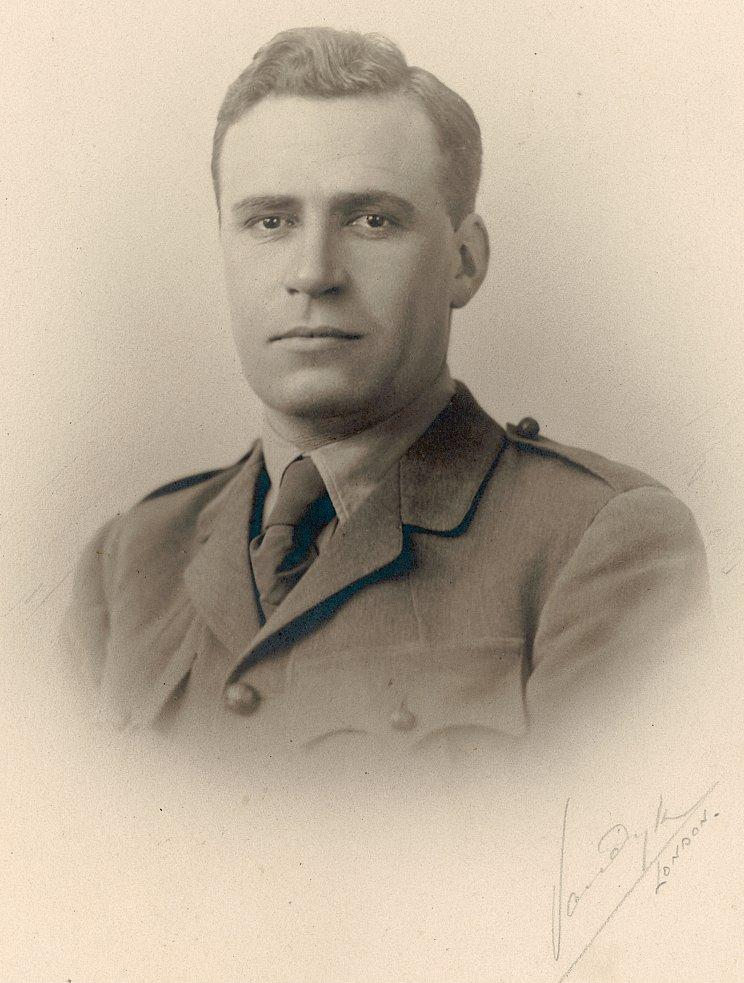
Sir Keith Murdoch (1885–1952)

Keith Arthur Murdoch, later Sir Keith Murdoch, was born in West Melbourne and grew up in the Melbourne suburb of Camberwell. He became prominent as a journalist, while serving as a war correspondent during World War I. In 1921, Murdoch was appointed chief editor of the Melbourne Herald and in 1928 became managing director of its parent company, The Herald and Weekly Times Ltd. That same year he married Elisabeth Joy Greene (1909–2012), who was later prominent as the philanthropist Dame Elisabeth Murdoch (1909–2012). Murdoch was knighted in 1933. During World War II, Sir Keith Murdoch served briefly in an Australian government role, as Director-General of Information.

Lieutenant Ivon George Murdoch, saw action with the 8th Battalion (AIF) on the Western Front during World War I.

=== Third generation ===
Rupert Murdoch, born in Melbourne, is a major international media proprietor – he chairs two United States-based companies that control most of his assets: News Corp and Fox Corporation. Murdoch's career as a media proprietor began in 1952, when he inherited his father's stake in News Limited. The company's only major asset was an Adelaide daily newspaper distributed only in South Australia, The News. During the 1950s and 1960s, News Ltd acquired daily and weekly newspapers, including suburban and provincial publications, throughout Australia and New Zealand. From 1968, Murdoch bought British newspapers, beginning with the weekly News of the World and the daily The Sun.

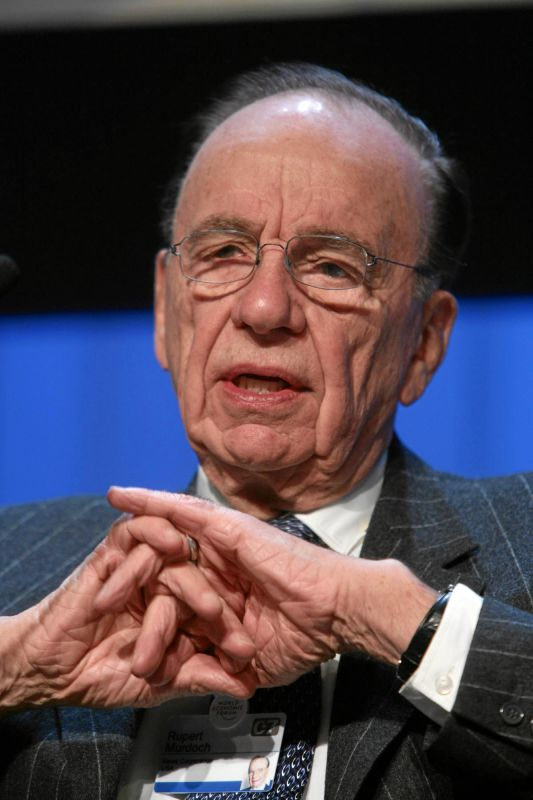
Rupert Murdoch at the World Economic Forum Annual Meeting in Davos, 2007

Murdoch made his first acquisition in the United States in 1973, when he purchased the San Antonio Express-News. Soon afterwards, he founded a US supermarket tabloid Star, and in 1976, he purchased the New York Post.

In 1981, Murdoch acquired the London Times and Sunday Times. He bought a major stake in 20th Century Fox in 1984, which became the basis of a new US free to air television network, Fox Broadcasting Company. To satisfy a legal requirement that only US citizens could own US television stations, Murdoch became a naturalised US citizen in 1985, and consequently forfeited his Australian citizenship.

During the 1980s and 1990s, Murdoch became involved in pay television interests throughout the world, including Foxtel in Australia, STAR TV and Tata Sky in Asia and BSkyB, Sky Italia and Sky Deutschland in Europe. NewsCorp also came to control both a major international publishing house HarperCollins, and Dow Jones & Company, which includes The Wall Street Journal.

Rupert Murdoch has been married five times and has six children:

- 1956–1967: to Patricia Booker, a flight attendant from Melbourne, with whom he had one child, Mrs Prudence MacLeod.
- 1967–1999: to Anna Maria Torv (later Anna Murdoch Mann; 1944–2026), a Scottish journalist of Estonian descent, who worked on Murdoch's Sydney Daily Telegraph, later published two novels and is the aunt of actress Anna Torv. Torv and Murdoch had three children, Elisabeth Murdoch (b. 1968), Lachlan Murdoch (b. 1971) and James Murdoch (b. 1972).
- 1999–2013 to Wendi Deng, a Chinese-US media executive and company director. They had two daughters, Grace (born 2001) and Chloe (born 2003). Tony Blair is Grace Murdoch's godfather. In June 2013, Rupert Murdoch filed for divorce from Wendi Murdoch, citing irreconcilable differences.
- 2016–2022 to Jerry Hall, an American model and actress. They divorced in 2022.
- 2024– to retired molecular biologist Elena Zhukova.

=== Fourth generation ===
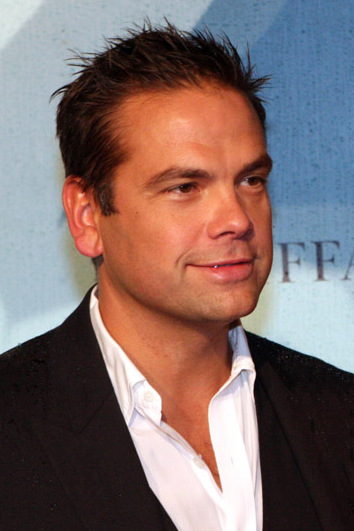
Lachlan Murdoch, Rupert's successor as chairman of News Corp

- Prudence Murdoch (born in Adelaide) has held directorial roles within the News Corporation empire. She has been married twice:
  - 1985–c. 1986, to British financier Crispin Odey.
  - since 1989, to: British media executive Charles Alasdair MacLeod (usually known as Alasdair MacLeod). Both Prudence and Alasdair MacLeod hold or have held directorial and/or executive roles within the News Corporation empire. The couple have three children, James MacLeod (b. 1991), Angus MacLeod (b. 1993) and Clementine MacLeod (b. 1996).
- Elisabeth Murdoch (born in Sydney), is a media executive and company director and has been married three times:
  - 1993–1998: to Elkin Kwesi Pianim, a Ghanaian banker, with whom she had two children, Cornelia Pianim (b. 1994) and Anna Pianim (b. 1997);
  - 2001–2014: to British public relations specialist Matthew Freud (the son of former MP Sir Clement Freud, and a great-grandson of Sigmund Freud), with whom she had two children, Charlotte Emma Freud (b. 2000) and Samson Murdoch Freud (b. 2007);
  - Since 2017: to the English artist Keith Tyson.
- Lachlan Murdoch (born in London), is a media executive and company director; he married the British-Australian model and actress Sarah Murdoch, née O'Hare (b. 1972) in 1999; the couple have three children, Kalan Alexander Murdoch (b. 2004), Aidan Patrick Murdoch (b. 2006) and Aerin Elisabeth Murdoch (b. 2010).
- James Murdoch (born in London), is a media executive and company director. In 2000, he married the US public relations specialist and climate change activist Kathryn Hufschmid. The couple have three children, Anneka Murdoch (b. 2003), Walter Murdoch (b. 2006) and Emerson Murdoch (b. 2008).
- Grace (born 2001)
- Chloe (born 2003)

== Family trust challenge (2024) ==
As of September 2024, a court case is proceeding which relates to the fourth generation's share in and control over the Murdoch media empire.

== Family tree ==
- Rev. James Murdoch m. Helen Murdoch
  - Rev. Patrick Murdoch (1850–1940) m. Annie, née Brown
    - George Murdoch (1883–1891)
    - Sir Keith Murdoch (1885–1952) m. Elisabeth Joy, née Greene now known as Dame Elisabeth Murdoch
      - Helen, née Murdoch, now known as Helen Handbury (1929–2004)
      - Rupert Murdoch, (b. 1931) m. (1956) Patricia, née Booker (div. 1967)
        - Prudence (Prue), née Murdoch (b. 1958) m. (1985) Crispin Odey (div. c. 1986)
        - Prue Odey m. (1989) Alasdair MacLeod
          - James MacLeod (b. 1991)
          - Angus MacLeod (b. 1993)
          - Clementine MacLeod (b. 1996)
      - Rupert Murdoch m. (1967) Anna, née Torv (div. 1999) now known as Anna dePeyster
        - Elisabeth, née Murdoch now known as Elisabeth Murdoch (born 1968) m. (1993) Elkin Kwesi Pianim (div. 1998)
          - Cornelia Pianim (b. 1994)
          - Anna Pianim (b. 1997)
        - Elisabeth Pianim m. (2001) Matthew Freud (div. 2014)
          - Charlotte Emma Freud (b. 2000)
          - Samson Murdoch Freud (b. 2007)
        - Elisabeth Freud m. (2017) Keith Tyson
        - Lachlan Keith Murdoch (born 1971) m. (1999) Sarah, née O'Hare now known as Sarah Murdoch
          - Kalan Alexander Murdoch (b. 2004)
          - Aidan Patrick Murdoch (b. 2006)
          - Aerin Elisabeth Murdoch (b. 2010)
        - James R. Murdoch (born 1972) m. (2000) Kathryn Hufschmid
          - Anneka Murdoch (b. 2003)
          - Walter Murdoch (b. 2006)
          - Emerson Murdoch (b. 2008)
      - Rupert Murdoch m. (1999) Wendi Deng (div. 2013)
        - Grace Murdoch (b. 2001)
        - Chloe Murdoch (b. 2003)
      - Rupert Murdoch m. (2016) Jerry Hall (div. 2022)
      - Rupert Murdoch m. (2024) Elena Zhukova
      - Anne, née Murdoch, now known as Anne Kantor (1936-2022)
      - Elisabeth Janet, née Murdoch, now known as Janet Calvert-Jones (born 1939)
    - Francis Garden Murdoch (1887–1933)
    - Alec Brown Shepherd Murdoch (1889–1920)
    - Ivon Murdoch (1892–1964), also known as Ivan Murdoch
    - Alan May Murdoch (1894–1971)
  - Francis Garden Murdoch (1852–? )
  - James Murdoch (1854–? )
  - Eliza Jane (Lizzie) Murdoch (1855–? )
  - William Garden Murdoch (1856–? )
  - Ivon Lewis Murdoch (1858–? );
  - Andrew Chrystal Murdoch (1859–1902) m. Ella Josephine Burton
    - Grace Young Murdoch (1884–1971)
    - Francis Garden Murdoch (1886–1940)
    - Kate Josephine Murdoch (1887–1966)
  - Helen Nora, née Murdoch, now known as Nora Curle Smith (1861–1924)
  - Keith Arthur Murdoch (1862–? )
  - Isabella Agnes Murdoch (1864–? )
  - Hugh Murdoch (1865–? )
  - Grace Young Murdoch (1867–? )
  - Amelia Morison Murdoch (1870–? ) and
  - Sir Walter Murdoch (1874–1970) m. Violet Catherine, née Hughston
    - Catherine, née Murdoch, later known as Catherine King (1904–2000)
