= Pittullie =

Pittulie
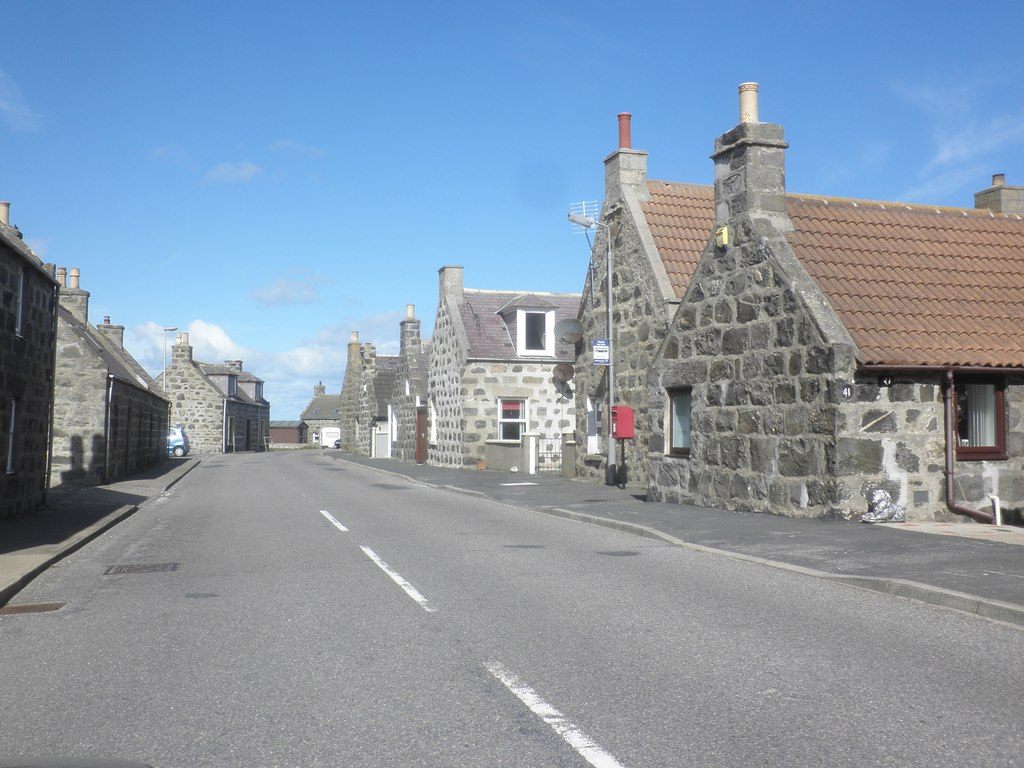
- Pittulie High Street

- Location within Aberdeenshire
- Council area: Aberdeenshire
- Country: Scotland
- Sovereign state: United Kingdom
- Dialling code: 01346
- Police: Scotland
- Fire: Scottish
- Ambulance: Scottish

Pittulie is a small fishing village in the Aberdeenshire parish of Pitsligo, Scotland. It lies between Rosehearty to the west and Sandhaven immediately to the east. Pittulie Castle was a former stronghold of the Frasers of Philorth.
