= Patrick John Murdoch =

Australian Presbyterian minister

The Reverend Patrick Murdoch
- Born: 10 June 1850; Pitsligo, Aberdeenshire, Scotland
- Died: 1 July 1940 (aged 90); Hawthorn, Victoria, Australia
- Education: University of Aberdeen; New College, Edinburgh
- Family: Murdoch family

Patrick John Murdoch (10 June 1850 – 1 July 1940) was an Australian Presbyterian minister who is known for being the father of Sir Keith Murdoch and the grandfather of Keith's son Rupert Murdoch.

== Early life ==
Murdoch was born on 10 June 1850 in Pitsligo, Aberdeenshire, Scotland. He was the oldest son and one of fourteen children (including his youngest brother Walter) born to Helen (née Garden) and Rev. James Murdoch. His father was a minister in the Free Church of Scotland.

Murdoch was raised in Rosehearty, a small fishing village on the Moray Firth. He graduated Master of Arts from the University of Aberdeen in 1870 and then followed his father into the Free Church ministry, studying at New College, Edinburgh. He subsequently served as an assistant minister at the Presbyterian Church in Regent Square, London, and the South Free Kirk in Aberdeen. Murdoch was licensed as a preacher in 1878 and began his service as an ordained minister in the parish of Cruden. As a young man he developed friendships with fellow Presbyterian ministers Ian Maclaren and William Robertson Nicoll, better known for their careers in fiction writing and journalism respectively.

== Career in Australia ==
In 1884, Murdoch moved to Melbourne, Australia, to take up the post of minister at the West Melbourne Presbyterian Church within the Presbyterian Church of Victoria. The parish had been without a minister for two years, with West Melbourne seeing a decline in its population as it transitioned from a residential to commercial area. Along with his wife and children, he was accompanied by his parents and four younger siblings. His father died only weeks after their arrival.

After three years at West Melbourne Presbyterian Church, Murdoch was called to Trinity Church, Camberwell, where he served from 1887 to 1928. He also served as moderator of the Presbyterian Church of Victoria in 1898–99 and moderator general of the Presbyterian Church of Australia in 1905–06.

Murdoch was clerk of the presbytery of Melbourne South from 1896 to 1920. During the Ronald v Harper slander and libel case in 1909, he refused to produce a letter which was in the presbytery's possession, and spent a night in gaol for contempt of court. William Gray Dixon suggested some 20 years later that this incident demonstrated how the Presbyterian Church of Australia "maintains her traditional spirit of independence".

== Personal life ==
In 1882, Murdoch married Annie Brown, with whom he had four sons and one daughter; one son predeceased him. His children included journalist Keith Arthur Murdoch and World War I veteran Ivon Murdoch.

Murdoch died on 1 July 1940 in Hawthorn, Victoria, aged 90.

== See also ==
- Murdoch family
