= E. W. Tipping =

American journalist, social commentator, and activist

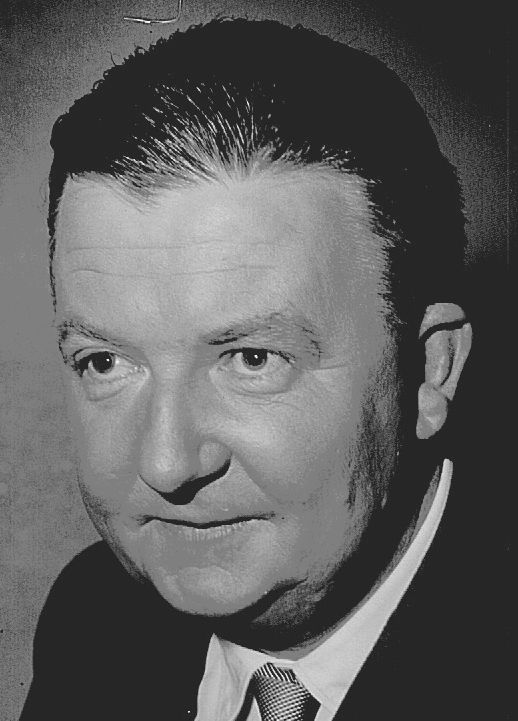
- Born: 27 August 1915; Melbourne, Australia
- Died: 29 April 1970 (aged 54); Melbourne, Australia
- Occupation: Journalist

Edmond William Tipping (1915–1970) was an Australian journalist, social commentator and activist.

== Early life and family ==
"Bill" Tipping was born in Moonee Ponds, and attended St Kevin's College, Melbourne where he was school captain in 1933. He studied law at the University of Melbourne, where he was an editor of the student newspaper Farrago, before being offered a position at the Melbourne Herald by Sir Keith Murdoch in 1939. He married Marjorie McCredie in 1942, with whom he had three sons. Tipping's third son, Peter, had intellectual and physical disabilities and died at the age of 14.

== Military service ==
Tipping served in the Pacific Theatre with the Australian Imperial Force and the Royal Australian Air Force from 1942–1945, including as a journalist for the service magazine Wings.

== Journalism ==
Tipping returned from military service to the Herald in 1945, becoming chief of staff in 1950. He was awarded a Nieman Fellowship in journalism at Harvard University, setting the scene for him to be an Australian correspondent for Time magazine and the New York Times upon his return to Australia in 1952.

Tipping's Herald column, "In Black and White", was high-profile, and garnered him the nickname "Mr Melbourne". He was a friend and confidant of many well-known Victorians, including Zelman Cowen (later Governor General Sir Zelman), architect Robin Boyd, television producer Hector Crawford and psychiatrist Dr Eric Cunningham Dax.

As a journalist, Tipping covered several world events, including the 1956 Melbourne and 1960 Rome Olympics, the South African Sharpeville massacre of 1960 (for which he received a Walkley Award), the Chicago Riots of 1968, and the Apollo 11 Moon mission.

== Disability advocacy ==
Through his journalism, Tipping was a vocal advocate for people experiencing disadvantage, in particular for people with a disability and their families. In 1953 he described the plight facing the family of an intellectually disabled boy, 'Michael', whose parents tied him to a stake in the backyard rather than send him to the government's Kew Cottages. The story helped foster public sympathy and concern for people with a disability.

With support from the Herald and Dr Cunningham Dax, then chairman of Victoria's Mental Hygiene Authority, Tipping became a vigorous campaigner for disability rights. He particularly highlighted the poor conditions at Kew Cottages, and through the Herald he helped raise substantial sums for their refurbishment and development. He also helped raise awareness of the disadvantages of large institutions and the potential value of residential disability services in a community setting.

== Death and legacy ==
Tipping died of cancer on 29 April 1970 in Melbourne and is buried in Burwood Cemetery. Shortly before his death a large public meeting was held in the Melbourne Town Hall in order to establish the EW Tipping Foundation to support people with a disability. The EW Tipping Foundation merged with House with No Steps in 2018, and is now known as Aruma.
