= Walter Murdoch =

Australian academic and essayist (1874-1970)

Sir Walter Murdoch KCMG
- Murdoch (left) and family at Point Lonsdale, Victoria, in 1910. His wife, Violet Catherine Murdoch (née Hughston) is upper centre. The girl centre right is his daughter, Catherine and the boy (lower right) is William (Will) Murdoch (1900–1950).
- Born: Walter Logie Forbes Murdoch; 17 September 1874; Rosehearty, Scotland, UK
- Died: 30 July 1970 (aged 95); South Perth, Western Australia
- Citizenship: British; Australian
- Education: University of Melbourne
- Occupation: Academic
- Spouse: Violet Catherine Hughston
- Children: 3, including Catherine King
- Relatives: Patrick John Murdoch (brother); Ivon Murdoch (nephew); Keith Arthur Murdoch (nephew); Rupert Murdoch (grandnephew)

Sir Walter Logie Forbes Murdoch, KCMG (17 September 1874 – 30 July 1970) was a prominent Australian academic and essayist famous for his intelligence and wit. He was a founding professor of English and former Chancellor of the University of Western Australia (UWA) in Perth, Western Australia.

A member of the prominent Australian Murdoch family, he was the father of Catherine, later prominent as Dr Catherine King MBE (1904–2000), a radio broadcaster in Western Australia; the uncle of both Sir Keith, a journalist and newspaper executive, and Ivon, a soldier in the Australian Army; and the great-uncle of international media proprietor Rupert Murdoch.

Murdoch University is named in Sir Walter's honour; as is Murdoch, the suburb surrounding its main campus, located in Perth, Western Australia.

== Background and early career ==
Murdoch was born on 17 September 1874 at Rosehearty, Scotland to Rev. James Murdoch, minister of the Free Church of Scotland, and his wife Helen, née Garden, and he was the youngest of their 14 children. He spent his first decade at Rosehearty and in England and France, and arrived with his family in Melbourne in 1884. He attended Camberwell Grammar School and Scotch College. At the University of Melbourne, as a member of Ormond College, he earned first-class honours in logic and philosophy.

After teaching in country and suburban schools to the end of 1903, Murdoch's academic career began with appointment as a Melbourne University assistant lecturer in English. This was in what had virtually become a combined department under the classics professor T. G. Tucker. Murdoch published his first essay, "The new school of Australian poets", in 1899, and he continued writing for the Argus, under the pen-name of "Elzevir", in a column which appeared weekly from 1905 titled "Books and Men". On 22 December 1897 at Hawthorn, Melbourne, Murdoch married Violet Catherine Hughston, also a teacher.

== University placement ==
In 1911, Murdoch was passed over in favour of an overseas applicant, Sir Robert Wallace, for the re-created independent chair of English at Melbourne University. Murdoch spent the next year as a full-time member of the Argus literary staff and was then selected as a founding professor of UWA. He commenced lectures in 1913 in tin sheds in the heart of Perth.

== Influential commentator ==
The literary and other friendships formed in Melbourne still exerted a strong nostalgic influence upon the middle-aged Murdoch. This has been established by his warmly sympathetic, but not uncritical, biographer John La Nauze; but the fact that he felt deeply his geographical and intellectual isolation in Perth was not evident to even his close associates there. Through the inter-war years, Murdoch broadened his influence upon Australian life—most noticeably within the western state but extending throughout the Commonwealth. On the young campus, he had a considerable following outside his own department and his immediate academic colleagues. Murdoch was known for his help to students and junior colleagues in difficulties.

Sympathy for underdogs and a willingness to champion lost causes extended beyond Murdoch's academic environment. It coloured his second major contribution to Western Australian life: his association with several other members of the foundation professoriate in building closer links between the university and the community. His most effective medium was the column he contributed to the "Life and Letters" page of the West Australian on alternate Saturday mornings.

Combined from 1933 with occasional day and evening talks on radio—he was to prove a very effective broadcaster—and appearances on public platforms, frequently in the chair, it brought Murdoch a wide and varied local following. His writing attracted, in his biographer's words, varying types of people "who read him, all with interest, most with pleasure, some with disapproval, over many years". "No other writer in the history of Australian letters has built so wide a reputation on the basis of the essay as a form of communication." These essays were directed at the widespread literate, but by no means academic, population of the still very isolated state. But Murdoch's audience did not stop there. Indeed, the "Elzevir" articles had begun to reappear in the Argus in 1919, and the essays in varying forms found an all-Australian market when Murdoch's writings were eventually syndicated on the Melbourne Herald network, then chaired by his nephew Keith Murdoch. Walter Murdoch's essays came to be read by others, then and much later, through collection and book form, from Speaking Personally (1930) onward. Moreover, for nearly twenty years from 1945, he conducted a weekly "Answers" column consisting of "little essays" on various questions, which was syndicated throughout New Zealand and most states and which was read by a huge public.

What Murdoch described as his one "real book", Alfred Deakin: A Sketch (1923), was the result of work done in a year's leave in and around Melbourne. It was not successful financially, nor as an introduction either to a larger joint biography (later abandoned) or to La Nauze's definitive two-volume Alfred Deakin: a Biography (1965).

Murdoch's limited interest, in his middle and later years, in Australian writing has often been criticised. However, in 1918 he published the Oxford Book of Australasian Verse (revised, 1923, 1945) and in 1951, after many years' delay, with Henrietta Drake-Brockman, Australian Short Stories, which was much better received than the verse anthology.

== Political involvement ==
In addition to his academic teaching and the benefits which the young university obtained from his extramural activities, Murdoch was to remain a member of its governing body after he resigned from his chair in 1939. Chancellor in 1943–48, he was appointed a Commander of the Order of St Michael and St George (CMG) in 1939 and raised to Knight Commander of the Order (KCMG) in 1964. The university awarded him an honorary D.Litt. in 1948. He had been president of the local League of Nations Union from its foundation in the early 1920s until 1936, was president of the Kindergarten Union in 1933–36, and supported movements for women's rights.

A depression at the time did not stop his actively opposing the idea of secession from the Commonwealth as a solution to Western Australia's economic ills. Much later, in 1950–51, he vehemently and stalwartly opposed the attempt to outlaw the Communist Party of Australia (CPA). His prominent essay, "I am going to vote No", rebuked Robert Menzies' attempt to eliminate the CPA in the 1951 referendum on that issue. Murdoch wrote that his opposition rested on one principle:

The Government is asking the citizens of Australia to give it powers which I do not believe that any government ought to possess....The question turns on a very simple question. Have we the right to punish a person for his opinions? If we punish anyone for breaking the law of the land, or for conspiring with others to break the law, that is justice; if we punish anyone for holding opinions with which we disagree, that is persecution.

— Walter Murdoch, I am going to vote "No"

== Death and memorials ==
Though the last years of Murdoch's long life were spent more or less as a recluse, with increasing deafness and declining eyesight, he remained mentally alert to the end. On 8 March 1962 at Perth Registry Office, Murdoch married his secretary-companion and nurse, Barbara Marshall Cameron. In 1964, he paid the last of several visits to his beloved Italy. When, in the month of his death, he was given a bedside message from Premier David Brand, announcing that the state government was to name its second university after him, he was able to send an appreciative acceptance. He added, sotto voce, "it had better be a good one!" Murdoch died on 30 July 1970, aged 95.

In addition to Murdoch University and the suburb of Murdoch, there is a walk dedicated to Sir Walter on South Wing Level 2 of the South Street Campus library of the university.

== Oral history ==
Murdoch was interviewed in 1965 by Hazel de Berg about his life and career. The recording can be found at the National Library of Australia.

== Published works ==
- Loose Leaves (1910)
- The Struggle for Freedom (6th edition) (1911): A history of British and Australian democracy, for schools.
- The Oxford Book of Australasian Verse (editor) (1918)
- Anne's Animals (1921). Poetry
- Alfred Deakin: A sketch (1923)
- Speaking Personally (1930)
- Saturday Mornings (1931)
- Moreover (1932)
- The Wild Planet (1934)
- Lucid Intervals (1936)
- The Spur of the Moment (1939)
- Steadfast: a commentary (1941)
- The Collected Essays of Walter Murdoch (1945)
- Australian Short Stories (editor) (1951)
- Answers (1953)
- Selected Essays (1956)
- 72 Essays: A Selection (1947)
- On Rabbits, Morality, etc.: Selected writings of Walter Murdoch (edited by Imre Salusinszky, foreword by Rupert Murdoch) (2011)

Academic offices
Preceded by James Battye	Chancellor of the University of Western Australia; 1943 – 1948	Succeeded by E. W. Gillett
