= List of listed buildings in Rosehearty, Aberdeenshire =

This is a list of listed buildings in the parish of Rosehearty in Aberdeenshire, Scotland.

== List ==
Name	Location	Date listed	Geo-coordinates	Notes	Category	LB number	Image
49 Union Street			57°41′54″N 2°06′56″W		B	40435	Upload Photo
7 Pitsligo Street, Post Office And Former Masonic Hall			57°41′48″N 2°06′54″W		C(S)	40432	Upload Photo
Cairnhill, War Memorial			57°41′30″N 2°06′57″W		B	40431	Upload Photo
Rosehearty Harbour			57°41′59″N 2°07′01″W		B	40433	Upload Photo
16 Union Street, The Jam And 2 The Square, Old Netting Factory			57°41′49″N 2°06′44″W		B	40436	Upload Photo
The Square, Jubilee Fountain			57°41′49″N 2°06′47″W		C(S)	40434	Upload Photo
2 Well Street			57°41′58″N 2°07′05″W		B	40437	Upload Photo

== Key ==
The scheme for classifying buildings in Scotland is:

- Category A: "buildings of national or international importance, either architectural or historic; or fine, little-altered examples of some particular period, style or building type."
- Category B: "buildings of regional or more than local importance; or major examples of some particular period, style or building type, which may have been altered."
- Category C: "buildings of local importance; lesser examples of any period, style, or building type, as originally constructed or moderately altered; and simple traditional buildings which group well with other listed buildings."

In March 2016 there were 47,288 listed buildings in Scotland. Of these, 8% were Category A, and 50% were Category B, with the remaining 42% being Category C.

== See also ==
- List of listed buildings in Aberdeenshire
