= Elisabeth Murdoch =

Elisabeth Murdoch may refer to:

- Elisabeth Murdoch (philanthropist) (1909–2012), Australian philanthropist, and mother of media tycoon Rupert Murdoch
- Elisabeth Murdoch (businesswoman) (born 1968), Australian businesswoman, daughter of Rupert and granddaughter of Dame Elisabeth
