= Marjorie Tipping =

Australian historian (1917–2009)

Dr Marjorie Tipping MBE
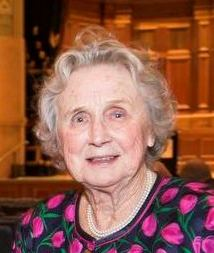
- Born: 26 March 1917; Melbourne, Australia
- Died: 28 September 2009 (aged 92); Melbourne, Australia
- Occupation: Historian

Marjorie Jean Tipping MBE (26 March 1917 – 28 September 2009) was an Australian historian and patron of community services.

== Biography ==
The daughter of John Alexandra McCredie and Florence Amelia Paterson, she was born Marjorie Jean McCredie in Melbourne, Australia, and grew up in Princes Hill and Kew. She studied at the Presbyterian Ladies' College and Melbourne University. In 1942, she married journalist Bill Tipping.

Tipping's works focus on the history of art and colonial Australia, and include Eugene von Guerard's Australian Landscapes (1975) Ludwig Becker: Artist & Naturalist with the Burke & Wills Expedition (1978), Melbourne on the Yarra (1978) and Convicts Unbound: The Story of the Calcutta Convicts and Their Settlement in Australia (1988). She also contributed to the Australian Dictionary of Biography.

Tipping was the first woman to earn the degree of Doctor of Letters by examination from the University of Melbourne. Tipping has contributed to many community organisations, including as first woman president (from 1972) of the Royal Historical Society of Victoria and as a patron (with Dame Elisabeth Murdoch and Governor of Victoria David de Kretser) of EW Tipping Foundation (a social justice and human rights organisation named for her late husband).

Tipping was made a Fellow of the Royal Historical Society of Victoria (1968) and appointed as a Member of the Order of the British Empire in the 1981 Birthday Honours for her contribution to the Arts.

Marjorie died in 2009 at the age of 92.
