= Margaret Graham =

Margaret Graham may refer to:

- Margaret Graham, Countess of Menteith (1334–1380), Scottish noblewoman
- Margaret Nowell Graham (1867–1942), American artist who painted with watercolors
- Margaret Bloy Graham (1920–2015), Canadian creator of children's books
- Margaret Collier Graham (1850–1910), short story writer in southern California
- Margaret Manson Graham (1860–1933), Scottish nurse and missionary in Nigeria
- Margaret Graham (broadcaster) (1889–1966), Australian teacher known for the radio program Kindergarten of the Air
- Margaret Graham (balloonist) (c. 1804–c. 1864), first British woman to make a solo balloon flight
- Margaret Graham (matron) (1860–1942), South Australian nurse served in Egypt during WWI
- Margaret Graham (dancer) (1931–2004), Argentine-Uruguayan ballerina
- Maggie Graham (born 2002), American soccer player

== See also ==
- Mary Margaret Graham, US Deputy Director of National Intelligence for Collection (2005–2008)
