= E. W. Tipping Foundation =

Australian not-for-profit community organization

The Tipping Foundation (formerly the E. W. Tipping Foundation) is a not-for-profit community organisation based in Victoria, Australia. The Tipping Foundation merged with House with No Steps in 2018, and is now known as Aruma.

The Foundation fosters social justice and human rights through community development and community services. The Foundation commenced as a disability organisation, and has now broadened its focus to encompass primarily disability services, children and family services, and services for people exiting the corrections system.

The Foundation was one of the first organisations in Victoria to adopt a person-centred approach to its disability services, and has contributed to the adoption of new methodologies and philosophies for supporting people of all abilities.

The Tipping Foundation’s Patron is the Governor of Victoria The Hon. Linda Dessau AC. The late Dame Elisabeth Murdoch was Patron until her death in 2012, as was the late Dr Marjorie Tipping to 2009.

== History ==
The Foundation was established in 1970, whilst its namesake, well-known journalist and disability rights activist E. W. Tipping, was hospitalised and terminally ill. It was formed following a public meeting of almost 1700 people at the Melbourne Town Hall.

Tipping’s work with the Melbourne Herald was instrumental improving conditions at Kew Cottages and other disability institutions. Tipping’s vision was for a network of family homes in the community, in which people lived non-institutional lives, in a community setting.

== Services ==
The Foundation now provides disability services, children and family services, and services for people exiting the corrections system. The Foundation established, in 2011, a specialist 30-bed community-based Acquired Brain Injury Rehabilitaton service, in partnership with UK-based Brainkind. The Foundation has more than 100 service locations across all of Victoria and the Riverina.

These include residential services (sometimes known as shared supported accommodation, or group homes) for people with disabilities and for young people, respite facilities and other projects such as supporting people wanting to move towards independent living, ageing carers, and ageing people with disabilities.

The Foundation is partnered with Victorian Person Centred Services, an organisation which began in 2004. It provides home and community-based services, including skills development, attendant care, support in educational and work settings, recreational and leisure activities and flexible respite.

The Foundation's Vision is "Independence. Choice. Community for All".

== Person-centred approaches ==
The person-centred philosophy adopted by E. W. Tipping Foundation, and many other community service organisations, is a focus on the individual choice and empowerment. It is a substantial shift from early charity and medical models of service provision.

Person-centred services recognise the rights of everyone, regardless of ability, to enjoy equal rights and responsibilities as citizens, choosing the way they want to live, to participate in the community, and to receive respect. Person-centred approaches are often supported by Person Centred Planning.

== Community development ==
The Foundation works to develop communities in Victoria, through co-operation and support of other community organisations, and through development of the community sector, particularly the disability sector. The Foundation is active in National Disability Services, Disability Professionals Victoria, and Australasian Disability Professionals, and was an early advocate of the Australian National Disability Insurance Scheme.

== See also ==
- Deinstitutionalisation
- Independent living
- Disability rights movement
- Social model of disability
- Social role valorization
