= Erica Underwood =

Australian community worker (1907–1992)

Erica Reid Underwood MBE
- Born: Erica Reid Chandler; 26 June 1907; Albany, Western Australia
- Died: 1 February 1992 (aged 84); Shenton Park, Western Australia

Erica Reid Underwood MBE (26 June 1907 – 1 February 1992) was an Australian expert in child psychology who became a radio broadcaster. She was recognised with an MBE for her community work.

== Life ==
Underwood was born in Albany in 1907. Her mother, Jessie Reid (born Clough), was born in Scotland and her father William Jenkins Chandler was a teacher born in Queensland.

From 1944 her friend Catherine King's radio program broadcast by the ABC each day was the ABC Women's Session. In the late 1940s, Underwood joined King and contributed talks and deputised when necessary. Her particular talent was her expertise in child psychology. The program was broadcast throughout Western Australia and included music, live interviews and discussion on subjects from science and arts to cooking and parenting. It was based on the premise that women at home were thinking people with wide interests and concerns. King and Underwood travelled in regional WA in an ABC van meeting women who listened to the program.

In 1974 the Western Australian Institute of Technology, which would become Curtin University, employed Underwood as the first woman on the establishment's council. She was appointed a Member of the Order of the British Empire in the 1978 New Year Honours in recognition of her work in radio, education and for the community.

== Death and legacy ==
Underwood died in the Perth suburb of Shenton Park in 1992. Curtin University's student accommodation includes Erica Underwood House which houses over 300 students. Her name was chosen because she was the first woman on their council and because she was the first person trained to be a psychologist in Western Australia.
