= Sandhaven =

Coordinates: 57.6972588°N 2.0636460°W

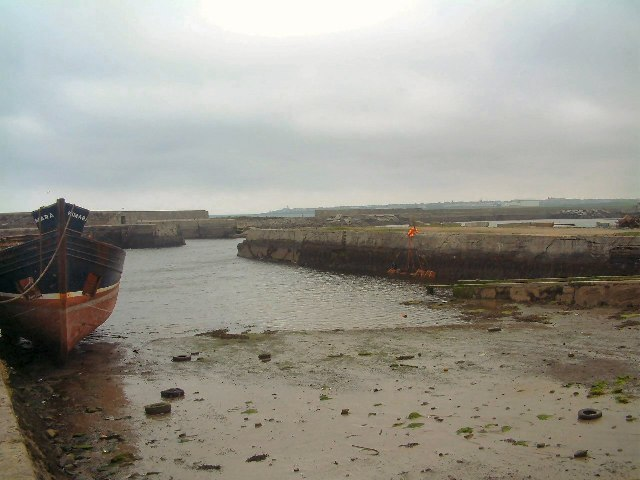
- Sandhaven Harbour

- Location within Aberdeenshire
- Population: 860 (2020)
- Council area: Aberdeenshire
- Country: Scotland
- Sovereign state: United Kingdom
- Police: Scotland
- Fire: Scottish
- Ambulance: Scottish

Sandhaven is a small fishing village in Aberdeenshire, Scotland, which lies between Rosehearty to the west and Fraserburgh to the east. It is joined to the even smaller village of Pittullie to the west.

== Fishing ==
The Annual Reports of the Fishery Board for Scotland provide an insight into the fishing in Sandhaven and Pittulie in the years before the First World War. The harbour had been significantly enlarged between 1871 and 1900, but in that year the report states that "the herring fishing is declining at these stations owing to the increased size of the boats and limited depth of water in the harbour. Line fishing has ceased to be profitable and was not much prosecuted." In 1912 it the report states briefly "no improvement at this station. Boats and fishing gear slowly depreciating."

Fishery Statistics

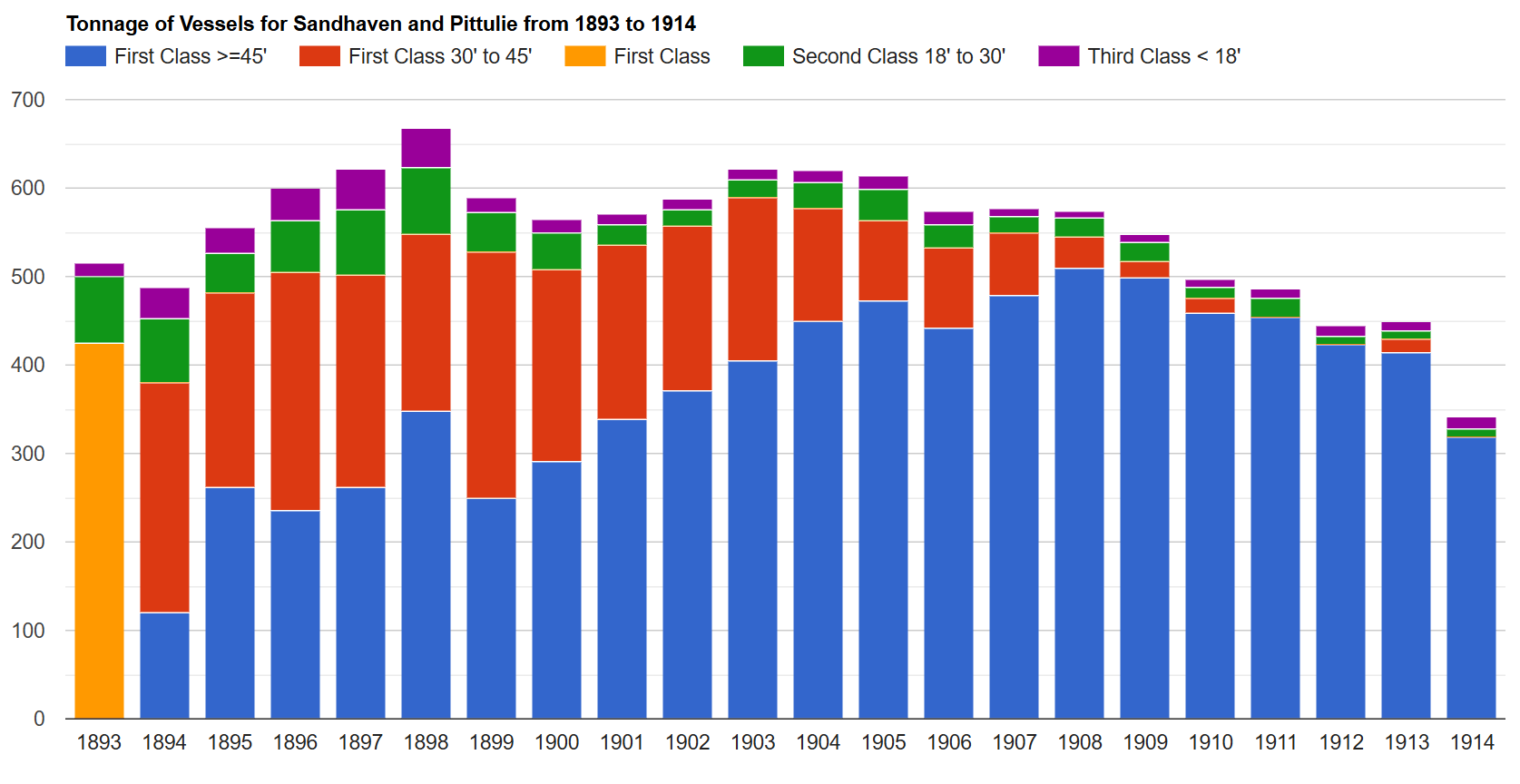
Tonnage of vessels

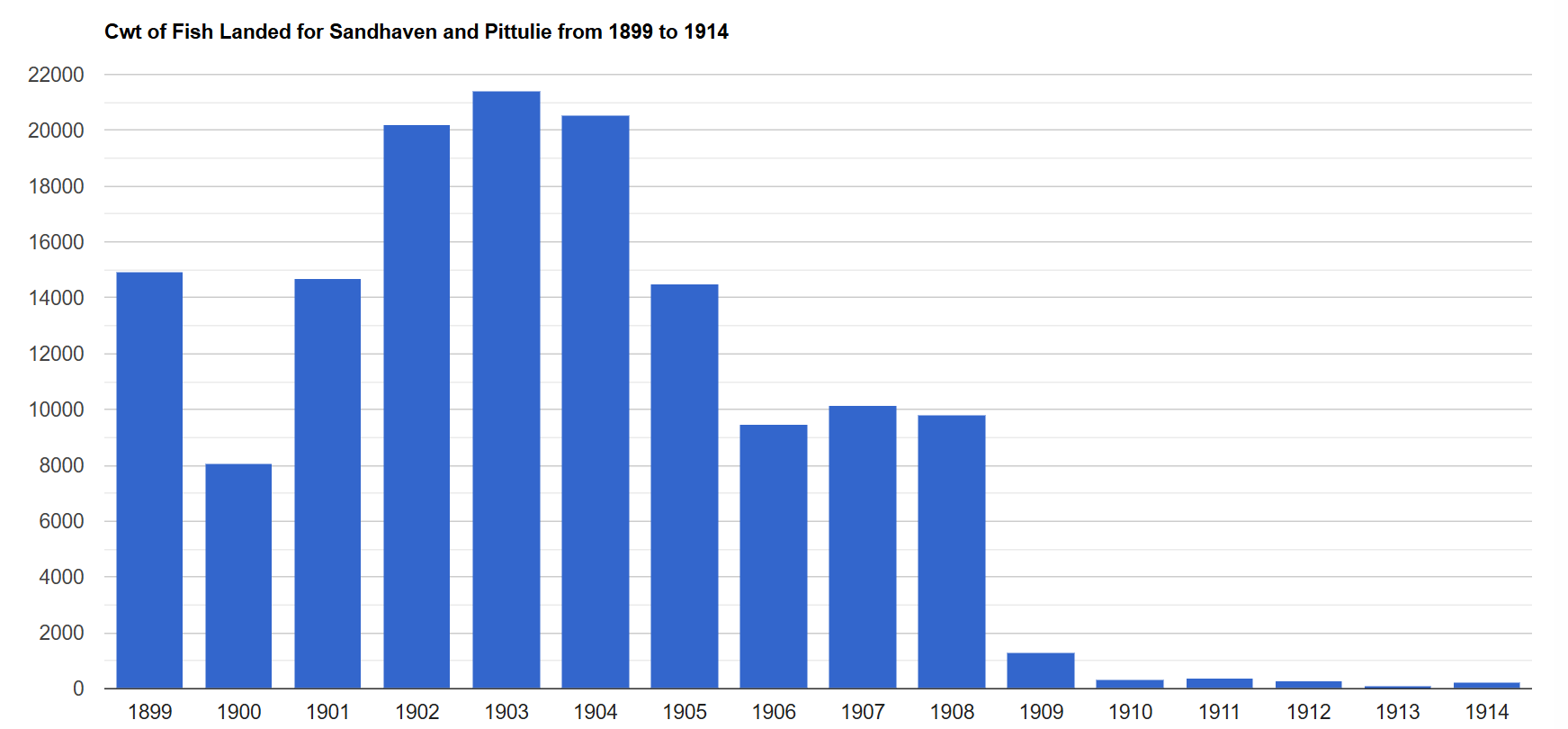
Cwt of fish landed

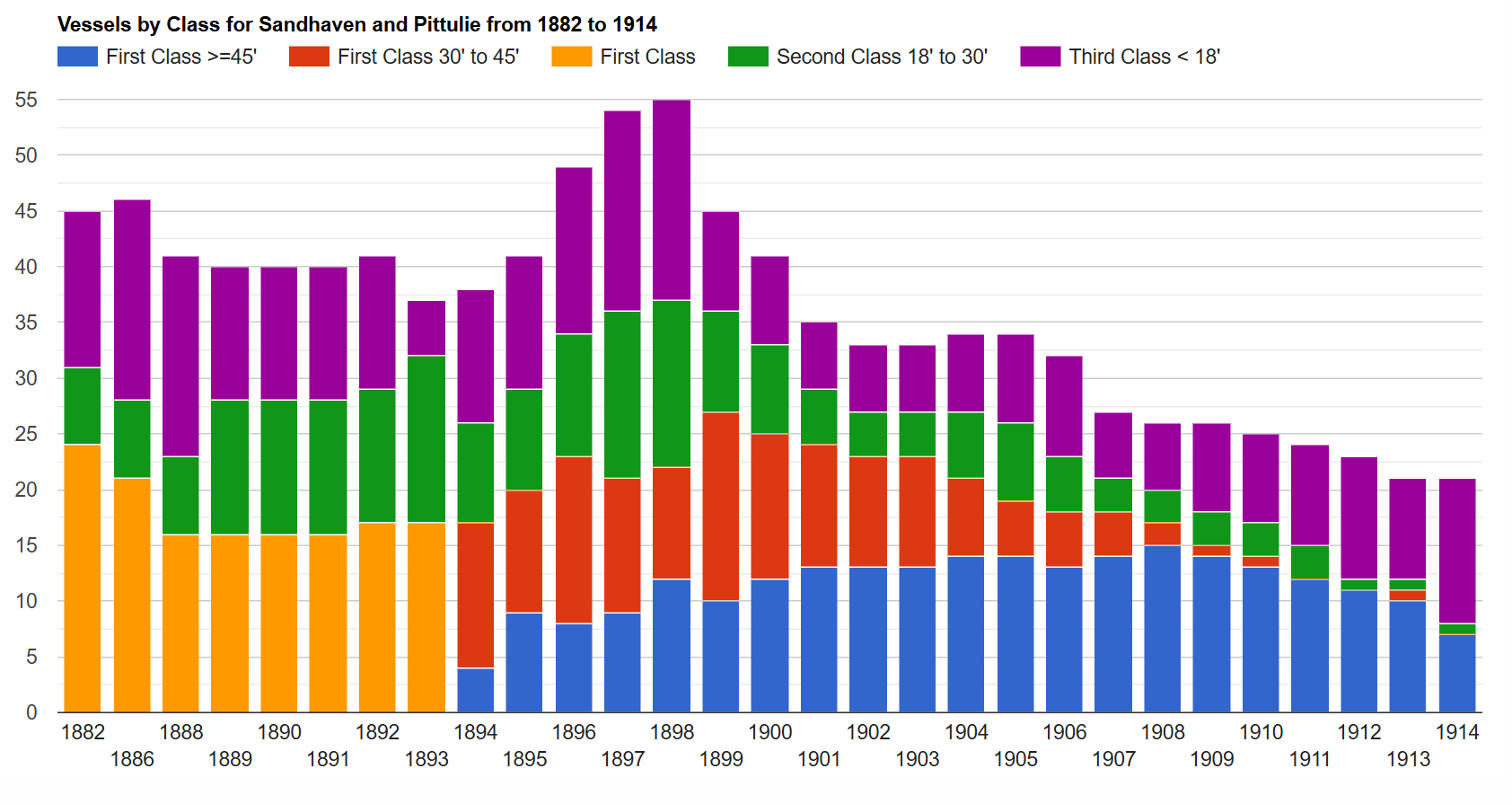
Vessels by class

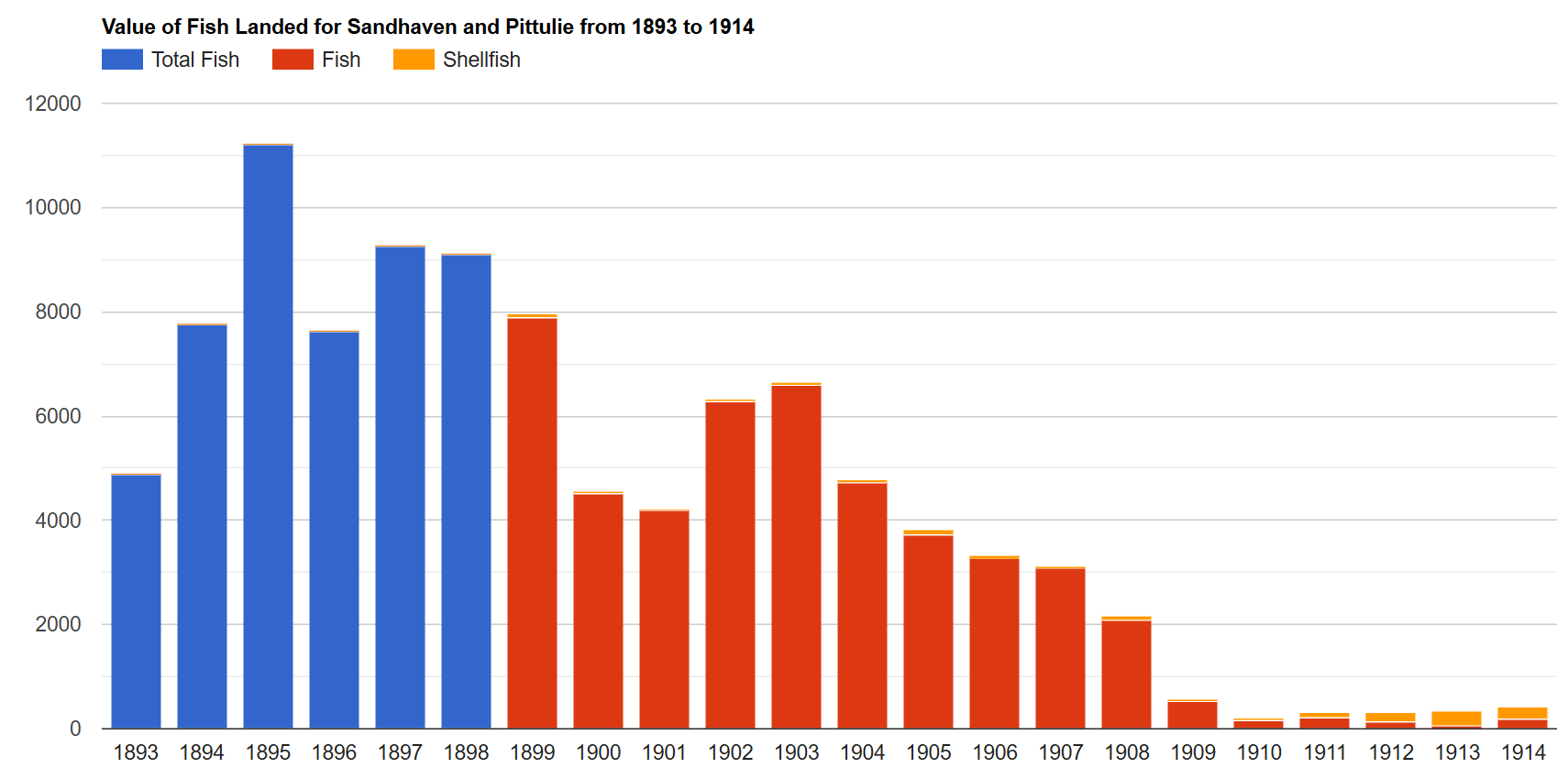
Value (£] of fish landed

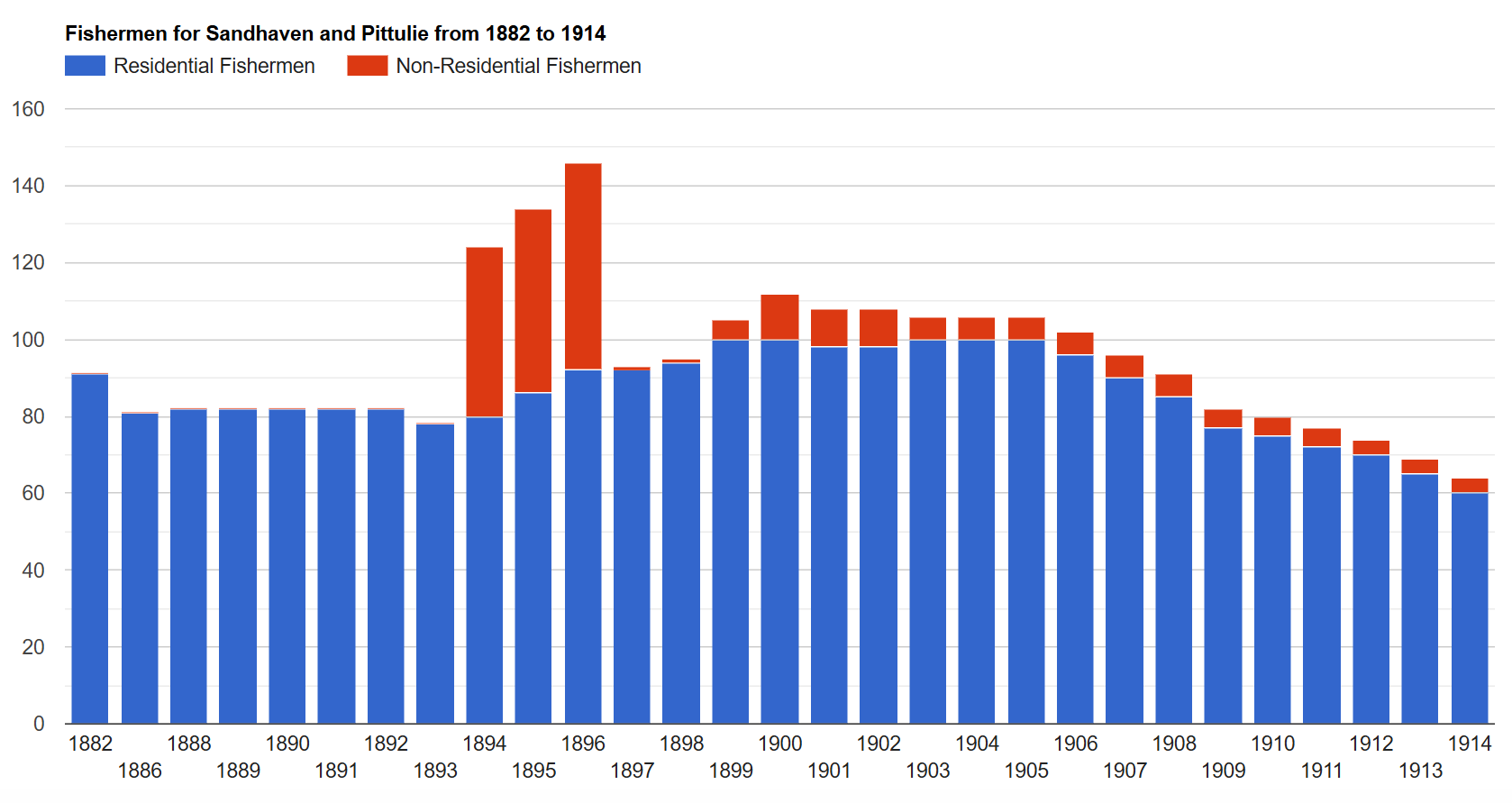
Fishermen

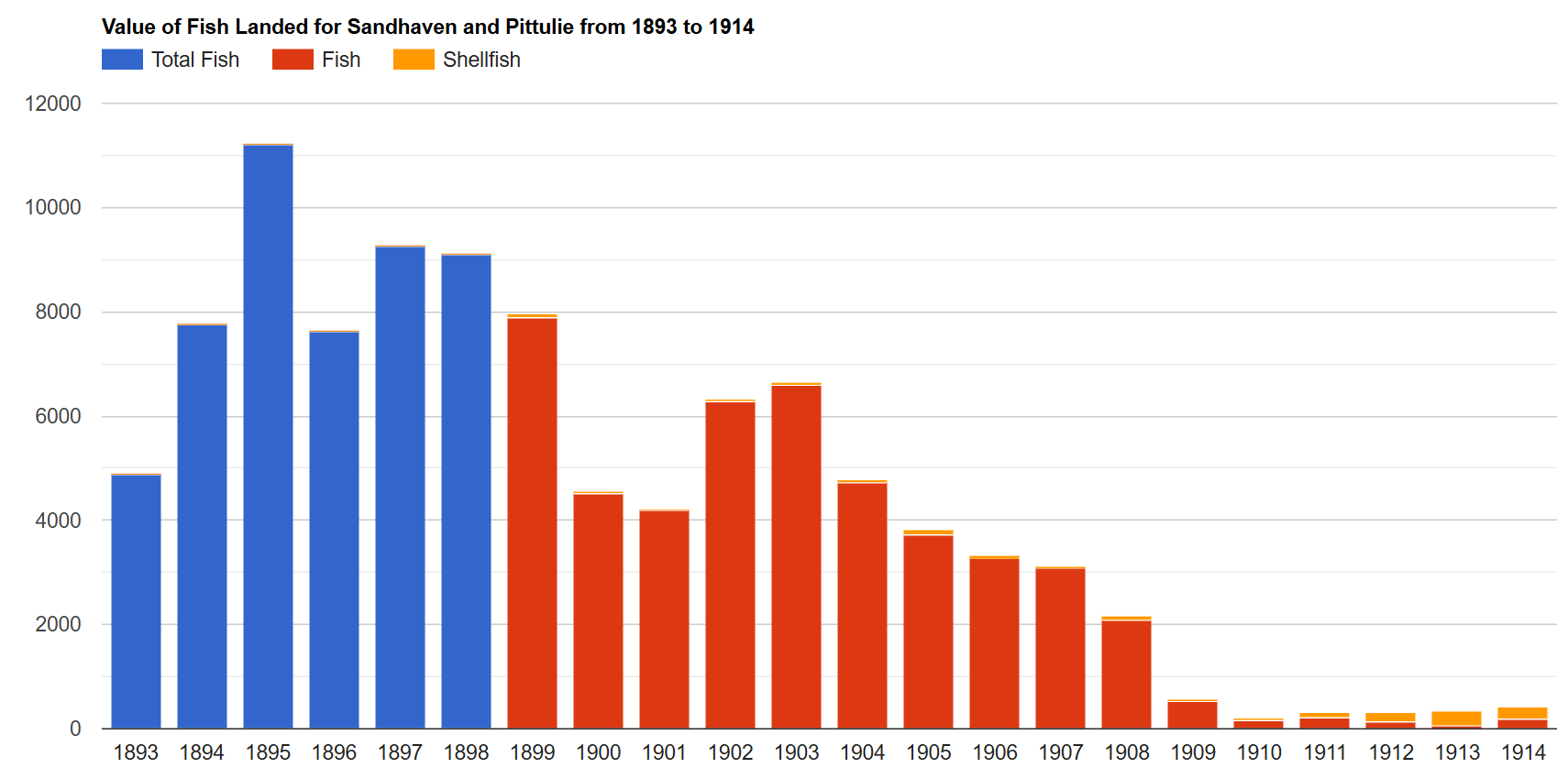
Number of curing stations
