= Ivon Murdoch =

Australian Army officer (1892–1964)

Ivon George Murdoch MC and bar (19 October 1892 – 12 August 1964) was an Australian Army officer during World War I. He was notable for the rare distinction of twice being awarded the Military Cross (MC) for bravery. Both nominations and awards were made within the space of one calendar year (1918). While Murdoch entered the army with rank of private, he was later commissioned as an officer and reached the rank of lieutenant.

Murdoch was born in Camberwell, Victoria, the son of an immigrant Scottish Presbyterian minister and theologian, the Reverend Patrick Murdoch (1850–1940) and his wife Annie, née Brown (1856–1945). Ivon Murdoch was the younger brother of prominent journalist and newspaper executive, Sir Keith Murdoch (the father of media tycoon Rupert Murdoch).

== War service ==
When he enlisted in the Australian Imperial Force (AIF) on 26 July 1915, Murdoch stated that his occupation was "Farmer" and his home address as Riversdale Road, Camberwell, Victoria. (His first name was occasionally misspelt "Ivan" in military records.) He was assigned initially to the 1–8 Reinforcements, 24th Battalion, which gave him the service number 3184. Murdoch was posted to the Western Front with the 8th Battalion.

Murdoch's first MC resulted from him leading extended night patrols, during March and April 1918, south-east of Ypres, Belgium, in No Man's Land and behind German lines, which captured a pillbox and returned wounded men to Australian positions. His second MC was awarded for actions during August 1918 that successfully:

- defended recently captured German field guns near Rosieres, France and;
- set up a machine gun enfilade, during the Battle of Lihons (part of the Hundred Days Offensive).

== Civilian life ==
Following the war, Murdoch was a farmer at Wantabadgery, New South Wales. He died there in 1964, aged 71 years old. He was survived by his wife, Alma, and sons Keith and Stuart, and predeceased by his son Ivon Murdoch Jr.
