= Margaret Graham (broadcaster) =

Australian kindergarten teacher and radio presenter

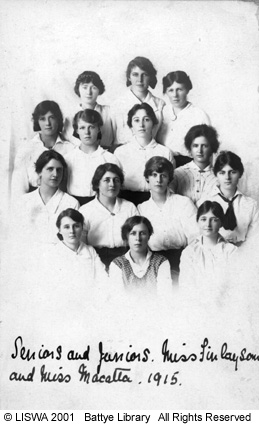
Students of the Kindergarten Training College in Perth, Western Australia, 1915. Margaret Graham is in the back row, first on the left.

Margaret Graham MBE (5 June 1889 – 25 January 1966) was an Australian kindergarten teacher and radio presenter known for voicing the radio program Kindergarten of the Air.

== Early years and education ==
Born to Scottish parents Maggie MacKeddie and John Graham in Ballarat, Victoria, Margaret was the fourth of six children. The family moved to Western Australia and settled in Leederville in 1893. Margaret attended the Kindergarten Training College in West Perth, graduating in 1916.

== Kindergarten of the Air ==
In 1942 the kindergartens in Perth and Fremantle were forced to close under threat of Japanese air raids. Members of the Kindergarten Union of Western Australia, led by Catherine King, proposed a daily radio program aimed at kindergarten children to Conrad Charlton, State manager of the Australian Broadcasting Commission.

The program was accepted and named Kindergarten of the Air on 19 February 1942, and a series of trials were held to find a presenter. Graham was chosen after two other kindergarten teachers had auditioned.

Her first program was broadcast live on 23 February 1942, with a pianist and two children in the studio. The program began at 9.30am and ran for 20 minutes. It was unscripted and included participation from the children present in the live audience. Each session could include songs, a story, exercise routines, health instruction and hints for making toys. Piano accompaniment was provided by Jean McKinlay.

== Influence ==
The Western Australian Kindergarten of the Air became the model for the rest of the country, with other states following its format and style for their own programs. In 1943 the ABC centralised the program in Sydney, but the time difference between the states meant that Graham's program retained its individuality and popularity.

== Later life and death ==
The popularity of the program gave Graham the chance to speak in other forums about children's education and behaviour. She spoke on Catherine King's program, the ABC Women's Session, and on the Children's Book Week 'Storytime' program in 1949.

In 1956, she was made a Member of the Most Excellent Order of the British Empire (MBE).

Graham continued as the sole voice of the Kindergarten of the Air until her health forced her to retire in 1960. She died in 1966, after suffering a stroke, and was cremated in Mount Lawley, Western Australia.
