= Catherine King (radio broadcaster) =

Australian radio broadcaster

from her biography

Catherine Helen King MBE (née Murdoch; 20 December 1904 – 2 January 2000) was an ABC broadcaster and community worker in Western Australia. She was the daughter of prominent Australian academic and essayist Sir Walter Murdoch.

== Biography ==
Born Catherine Helen Murdoch on 20 December 1904 in Surrey Hills, Victoria, Australia, she was the daughter of Violet Catherine Hughston and Sir Walter Murdoch. She married Alexander King, well known as Alec King (born 22 May 1904 in Dorset, England – died March 1970 in Canterbury, Victoria, Australia). They had three children, Walter, Francis and Elizabeth.

From 1929, King was associated with the Kindergarten Union: first on the Education Committee and later as part-time lecturer at the Kindergarten Teachers' College. Her husband Alec King was a member of the ABC Education Broadcasting Committee. King gave regular talks on topics ranging from art and politics to education. King helped organise Parent Education Groups in Perth and the country. In the late 1930s, another avenue for parent education became available, and King began her series of Parent Education broadcasts for the ABC. What had begun as a small project to interest parents in providing quality reading soon turned into an influential program recommending good books for young readers.

In 1942 King campaigned to start a radio program for children in Western Australia, and succeeded with the Kindergarten of the Air. She chose Margaret Graham to voice the program, which ran for many years.

On 4 September 1944, King's daily radio program was called the ABC Women's Session. In the late 1940s, King was joined by Erica Underwood who would contribute talks and deputise when necessary. The program was broadcast throughout WA and included music, live interviews and discussion on subjects from science and arts to cooking and parenting. It was based on the premise that women who were not in the paid workforce were thinking people with wide interests and concerns. King and Underwood travelled in regional WA in an ABC van meeting women who listened to the program.

In 1960 King was appointed to present a half-hour weekly television program, Women’s World, in addition to her radio commitments. In 1966 King gave up her ABC position to travel with Alec to Melbourne, where he had been offered a chair in English at Monash University. Her final program was broadcast in 1976.

King was made a Member of the Order of the British Empire for services to the community in 1966.

King died on 2 January 2000 in Mosman Park, Western Australia.

== Children's book ==
- Australian Holiday (1945) (in collaboration with Alec King)
