= Elisabeth Murdoch (philanthropist) =

Australian philanthropist (1909–2012)

Dame Elisabeth Murdoch AC DBE
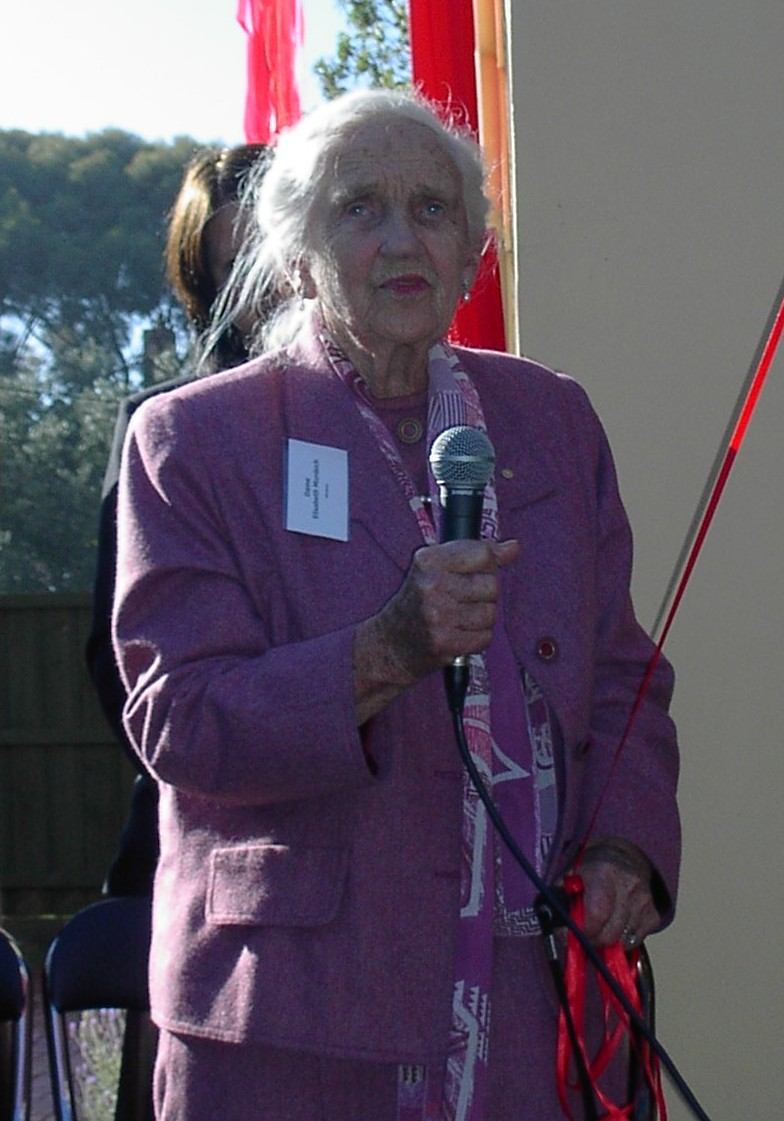
- Murdoch opening a drug rehabilitation centre in Melbourne, May 2005
- Born: Elisabeth Joy Greene; 8 February 1909; Melbourne, Australia
- Died: 5 December 2012 (aged 103); Melbourne, Australia
- Occupation: Philanthropist
- Spouse: Keith Murdoch (m. 1928; died 1952)
- Children: 4, including Rupert Murdoch
- Relatives: Murdoch family

Dame Elisabeth Joy Murdoch, Lady Murdoch AC DBE (née Greene; 8 February 1909 – 5 December 2012), also known as Elisabeth, Lady Murdoch, was an Australian philanthropist and matriarch of the Murdoch family. She was the wife of Australian newspaper publisher Sir Keith Murdoch and the mother of international media proprietor Rupert Murdoch. She was appointed a Dame Commander of the Order of the British Empire (DBE) in 1963 for her charity work in Australia and overseas.

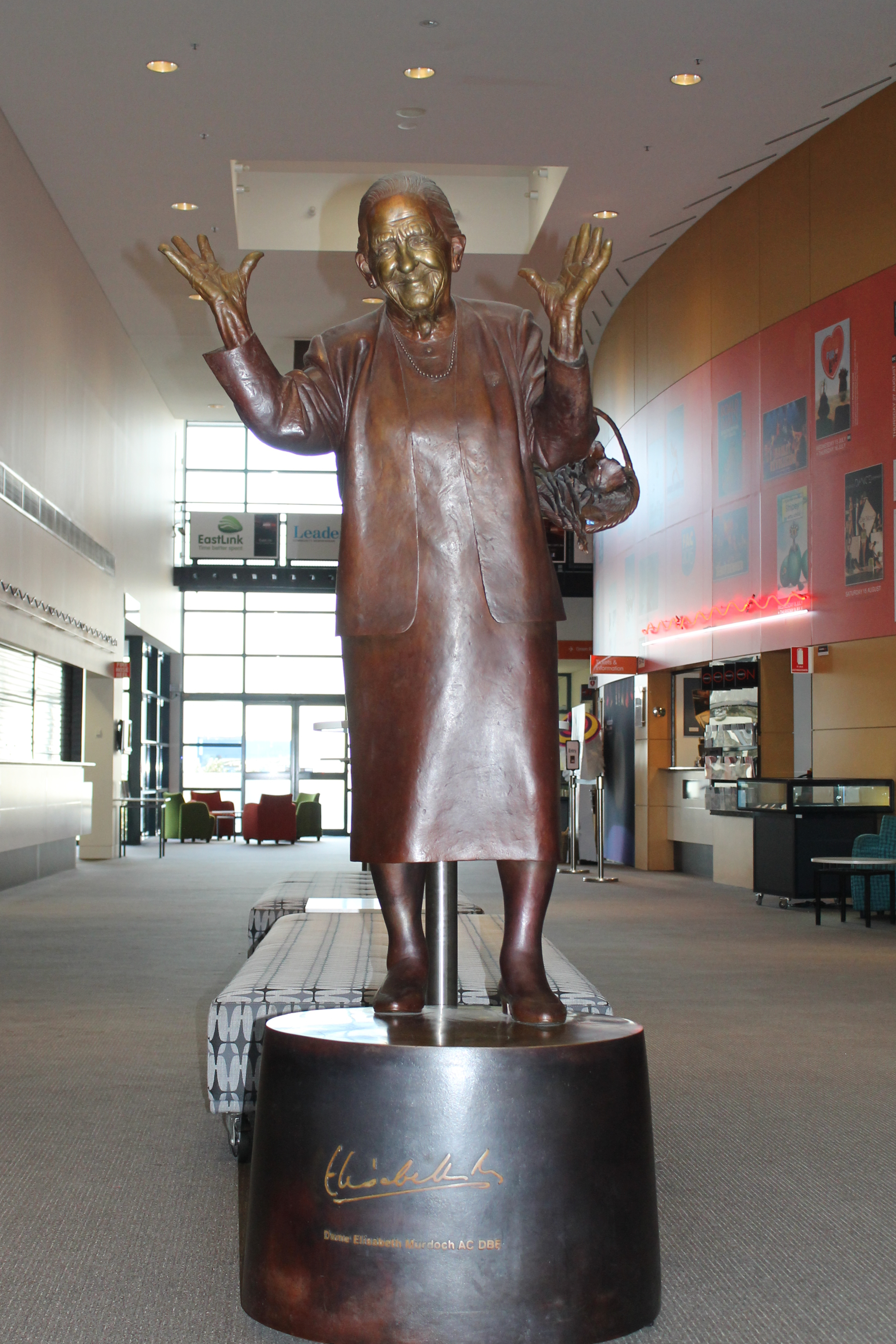
Sculpture of Murdoch

== Early life and education ==
Elisabeth Joy Greene was born in Melbourne on 8 February 1909. She was the youngest of three daughters born to Marie Grace de Lancey (née Forth) and Rupert Greene. Her grandfather, William Henry Greene, was an Irish railway engineer (later one of the three Commissioners of Victorian Railways) who emigrated to Australia and married Fanny, the fourth of the 10 daughters of George Govett. Her mother's ancestors were Scottish and English; one of her maternal great-grandfathers, Frederick Forth, was a lieutenant governor in the West Indies.

Elisabeth was educated at St Catherine's School in Toorak, and at Clyde School in Woodend.

== Personal life and death ==
She married Keith Murdoch, 23 years her senior, in 1928, and inherited the bulk of his fortune when he died in 1952. Apart from Rupert, her other children are Janet Calvert-Jones AO (born 1939), Anne Kantor AO (1937–2022), and Helen Handbury AO (1929–2004). At the time of her death on 5 December 2012, she had 77 living descendants.

== Philanthropy ==
Murdoch devoted her life to philanthropy. Before her marriage she worked as a volunteer for the Royal Society for the Prevention of Cruelty to Animals. She joined the management committee of the Royal Children's Hospital in 1933, serving as its president from 1954 to 1965. She was earmarked to succeed to the presidency by her predecessor Ella Latham and oversaw the hospital's move from its Carlton facilities to a new purpose-built campus in Parkville. A 2003 article in the Melbourne newspaper The Age said: "Few can rival Dame Elisabeth's enormous contribution. Her interests are so many they need to be alphabetically catalogued: academia, the arts, children, flora and fauna, heritage, medical research, social welfare. Many of Melbourne and Australia's most cherished institutions, from the Royal Children's Hospital to the Australian Ballet and the Botanic Gardens, have benefited from her involvement. But Murdoch also devoted herself to less popular causes: prisoners, children in care, those battling mental illness and substance abuse."

Murdoch was a Life Governor of the Royal Women's Hospital. She was the patron of the Murdoch Children's Research Institute and of the Australian American Association (Victoria), founded by her husband. She was a patron and founding member of disability organisation EW Tipping Foundation and a founding member of the Deafness Foundation of Victoria. The first woman on the council of trustees of the National Gallery of Victoria, Murdoch was a founding member of the Victorian Tapestry Workshop. She was a member of the Patrons Council of the Epilepsy Foundation of Victoria. Her garden, "Cruden Farm", at Langwarrin, is one of Australia's finest examples of landscape gardening and is regularly open to the public. It was originally designed by Edna Walling.

== Distinctions ==
=== Orders and medals ===
For her service as president of the Royal Children's Hospital, Melbourne, Murdoch was appointed a Commander of the Order of the British Empire, Civil Division (CBE) in the 1961 Birthday Honours list. For her role in building a new children's hospital in Melbourne, she was appointed a Dame Commander of the Order of the British Empire, Civil Division (DBE) in the 1963 New Year Honours list. In June 1989, she was appointed a Companion of the Order of Australia, Civil Division (AC) for services to the community also receiving the Centenary Medal in 2001 for her philanthropic services to the Australian arts community.

=== Honours ===
Murdoch was an honorary fellow of the Australian Institute of Landscape Architects and helped to establish the Elisabeth Murdoch Chair of Landscape Architecture and the Australian Garden History Society. In 1983, she was awarded an honorary Doctorate of Laws by the University of Melbourne in acknowledgement of her contributions to research, the arts and philanthropy. Trinity College, Melbourne, installed her as a fellow in 2000. That year a portrait of Murdoch for the National Portrait Gallery in Canberra was the first portrait commissioned of the Victorian Tapestry Workshop. The image was composed by painter Christopher Pyett, adapted on computer by Normana Wight and woven by Merrill Dumbrell. In 2001 Murdoch was inducted onto the Victorian Honour Roll of Women. In the same year, Treloars gave her name to a new rose introduction. Following extensive donations to the Royal Botanic Gardens in Melbourne, a Tasmanian species of Boronia (B. elisabethiae) was named after her. She was also awarded by the French government for funding an exhibition of works by the French sculptor Auguste Rodin in Melbourne in 2002. In 2003, Murdoch was admitted into life membership of Philanthropy Australia, and awarded the key to the City of Melbourne in an official ceremony at the Melbourne Town Hall. In 2004, a high school, Langwarrin Secondary College, was renamed Elisabeth Murdoch College to honour her work in the local community. Murdoch's charity work earned her the Victorian of the Year award in 2005 at age 96. In 2009, the main performance venue of the Melbourne Recital Centre was named in her honour. and in the same year she was elected an Honorary Fellow of the Australian Academy of the Humanities. In 2010, Geelong Grammar School completed a new girls' boarding house named in her honour.

In January 2007, aged 97 years and 11 months, Murdoch surpassed Dame Alice Chisholm as Australia's longest-lived dame.

== Patronage ==
Murdoch was a patron of the Australian Family Association.

== Death ==
On 5 December 2012, Murdoch died in her sleep at Cruden Farm, Langwarrin, Victoria, at the age of 103.
