= Pitsligo =

Coordinates: 57.699805°N 2.08093°W

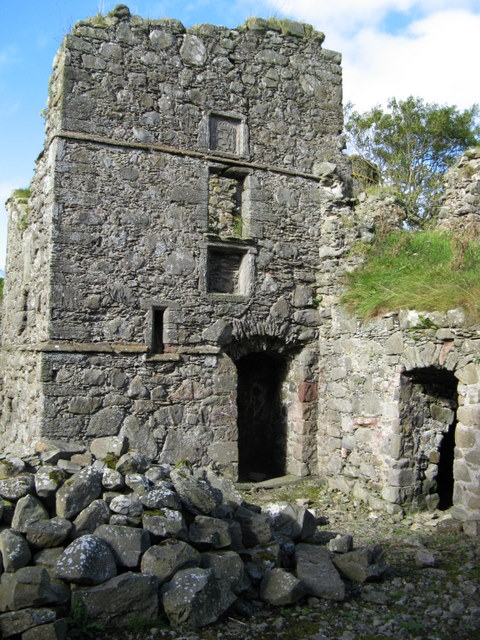
- Ruins of Pitsligo Castle

- Location within Scotland
- OS grid reference: NJ942676
- Lieutenancy area: Aberdeenshire
- Country: Scotland
- Sovereign state: United Kingdom
- Police: Scotland
- Fire: Scottish
- Ambulance: Scottish

Pitsligo was a coastal parish in the historic county of Aberdeenshire, Scotland, containing the fishing villages of Rosehearty, Pittulie and Sandhaven, 3 miles (6 km) west of Fraserburgh and 12 miles (19 km) north of Mintlaw.

The name is derived from the Gaelic Peit Shligeach, meaning "portion of land abounding in shells". The parish was established on 28 June 1633, from parts of the existing parishes of Aberdour, Fraserburgh and Tyrie. Pitsligo Castle dates from the 15th century.

Old Pitsligo Church, known locally as the Rathill or Peathill Kirk, dates to 1632. Its loft, described by Charles McKean as "magnificent", was added two years later. It was later moved and installed in the Hill Church of Rosehearty. The church was constructed after Pitsligo seceded from the parish of Aberdour. It is believed the split occurred after a minister "ranted in a sermon" about the "three Pits of Hell", namely Pittulie, Pittendrum and Pitsligo.

== Old Pitsligo Church ==
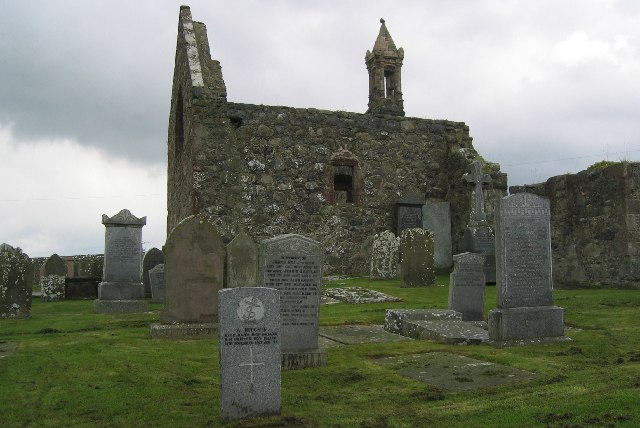
The ruins of the church, 2004

== Notable people ==
- Hugh Mercer, soldier

== See also ==
- New Pitsligo
