= Keith Murdoch =

Australian journalist (1885–1952)

Sir Keith Murdoch
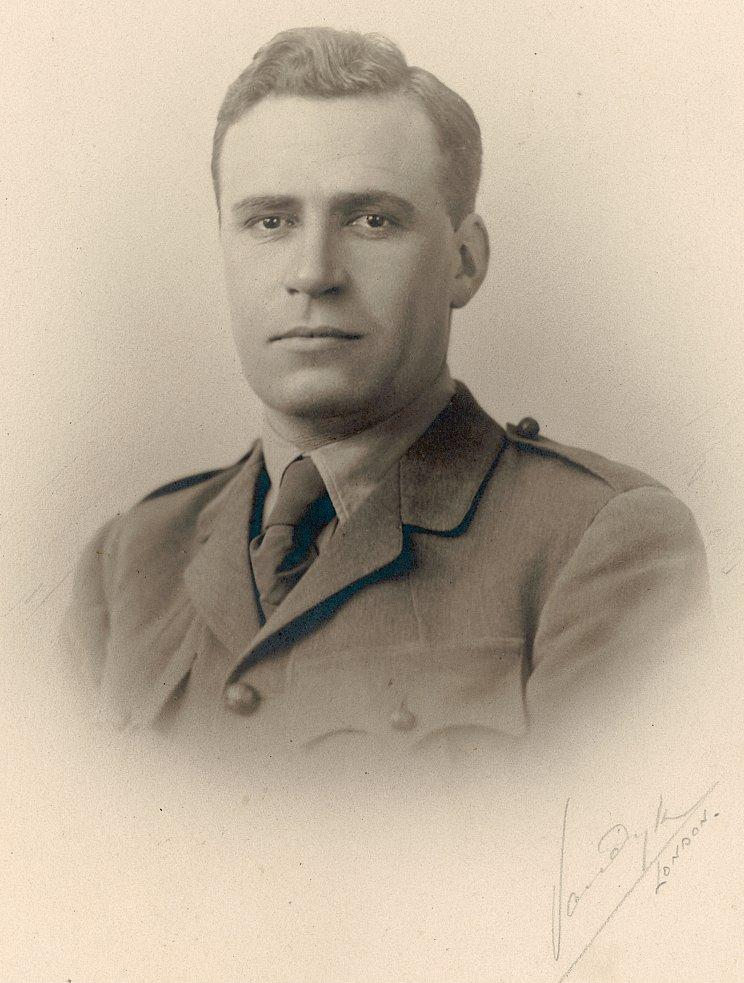
- Born: Keith Arthur Murdoch; 12 August 1885; Melbourne, Victoria, Australia
- Died: 4 October 1952 (aged 67); Langwarrin, Victoria, Australia
- Occupations: Journalist; media proprietor
- Spouse: Elisabeth Greene (m. 1928)
- Children: 4, including Rupert
- Parents: Patrick John Murdoch; Annie Brown
- Family: Murdoch family

Sir Keith Arthur Murdoch (12 August 1885 – 4 October 1952) was an Australian journalist and media proprietor who was the founder of the Murdoch media empire. He amassed significant media holdings in Australia which after his death were expanded globally by his son Rupert.

Murdoch was born in Melbourne, the son of a Presbyterian minister. He began his journalism career with The Age in 1903, eventually becoming a parliamentary reporter. In 1915, he moved to England as editor of Hugh Denison's overseas cable service, where he rose to prominence as a war correspondent during World War I. Murdoch's attacks on the Allied high command's conduct in the Gallipoli campaign brought him to the attention of senior British politicians and press barons, including Lord Northcliffe who served as a mentor. He also became a confidant of Australian prime minister Billy Hughes, although they fell out by the end of the war.

In 1921, Murdoch returned to Melbourne as chief editor of The Herald, beginning a long association with its holding company, the Herald and Weekly Times Ltd (HWT). He became managing director in 1928 and chairman in 1942, overseeing a significant expansion of the company into interstate newspaper markets and commercial radio. Murdoch established a monopoly in the Adelaide newspaper market in 1931 and in 1933 established The Courier-Mail as Brisbane's daily newspaper; he also controlled The West Australian for several years. Murdoch co-founded the Australian Associated Press (AAP) in 1935 and was the inaugural chairman of Australian Newsprint Mills. During World War II he briefly served as Director-General of Information.

Outside of his business activities Murdoch was an art collector, serving as chairman of the National Gallery of Victoria and endowing a chair of fine arts at the University of Melbourne. He had four children with his wife Elisabeth, a prominent philanthropist. He retired in 1949, dying of cancer in 1952. In his final years, he sold out of HWT and invested heavily in The News, an Adelaide tabloid. Its holding company News Limited formed the basis for his only son Rupert's global media empire.

== Early life ==
Murdoch was born in Melbourne in 1885, the son of Annie (née Brown) and the Rev. Patrick John Murdoch, who had married in 1882 and migrated from Cruden, Scotland, to Victoria, Australia, with his family in 1884. His paternal grandfather was a minister with the Free Church of Scotland, and his maternal grandfather was a Presbyterian minister.

The family moved from West Melbourne to the affluent suburb of Camberwell in 1887. Keith was educated at his uncle Walter's short-lived school, then at Camberwell Grammar School, where he became dux in 1903, despite extreme shyness and stammering. He decided not to go straight to university but to try a career in journalism, so family friend David Syme of The Age agreed to employ him as district correspondent for nearby Malvern. Over the next four years, he managed to create a significant increase in The Age's local circulation, to earn promotion, and to save enough money for a ticket to England, where he hoped to gain further experience and find ways to manage his stammer.

== Education and career ==
From 1908 to 1909, in London, he took speech therapy with Lionel Logue, studied part-time at the London School of Economics, and tried to find employment as a journalist, with the help of recommendations from more family friends, including Australia's Prime Minister Alfred Deakin. His stammer became manageable, but shortly after it cost him a job with the Pall Mall Gazette. In September 1909, Murdoch returned home to resume work for The Age, now as a parliamentary reporter, in which capacity he strengthened the family's relationships with politicians such as Andrew Fisher, in some cases entertaining them at his aunt's country guest house.

=== First World War ===
In 1912, he became Melbourne political correspondent for The Sun of Sydney. Losing out to the more experienced Charles Bean for the position of official Australian correspondent covering World War I, he was appointed managing editor of the London cable service run by the Sun and the Melbourne Herald in 1915. Murdoch travelled to New Zealand in January 1915 with Prime Minister Andrew Fisher, and two other MPs, the Hon. J. Boyd, and the Hon. D. Hall, covering war talks between Fisher and the New Zealand Prime Minister, William Massey, just before the engagement of Australian and New Zealand troops in the Gallipoli campaign.

They travelled from Wellington aboard the Ulimaroa, arriving in Sydney on 2 February 1915. Andrew Fisher and Defence Minister George Pearce then asked him to take time on his journey to London, to check on some matters of concern relating to supplies and mail for Australian troops in the conflict, so he stopped off in Egypt. While there in August, he was able to secure the permission of Sir Ian Hamilton, the Gallipoli campaign's commander, to visit Australian troops in Gallipoli and write his impressions for the newspapers, subject to the usual military censorship. The agreement he signed specified that he was "not to attempt to correspond by any other route or by any other means than that officially sanctioned" and during the war he must not "impart to anyone military information of a confidential nature ... unless first submitted to the Chief Field Censor."

Murdoch visited Anzac Cove at the beginning of September, then moved to the headquarters on the island of Imbros. Discussing the situation with other journalists, he was befriended by the Daily Telegraph correspondent Ellis Ashmead-Bartlett, who was deeply concerned that censorship was being used to suppress criticism of the Gallipoli campaign, which, as Murdoch had seen for himself, had serious problems. Murdoch agreed to carry a letter from Ashmead-Bartlett to the British Prime Minister H. H. Asquith in London, written on 8 September, presenting his uncensored report of the situation. Hamilton quickly learned about the existence of this letter. Another British reporter, Henry Nevinson, has been blamed for this, but his biography points to an official Royal Navy war photographer.

Reaching France on his route to London, Murdoch was arrested by Military Police in Marseille and the letter was confiscated. Arriving in London on 21 September, he spent some time at the Australian High Commission composing his own letter to his prime minister, Andrew Fisher, in a similar vein to the Ashmead-Bartlett letter, and particularly critical of the British general and administrative staff:

The conceit and self complacency of the red feather men are equaled only by their incapacity. Along the line of communications, especially at Moudros, are countless high officers and conceited young cubs who are plainly only playing at war. ... appointments to the general staff are made from motives of friendship and social influence.

— Murdoch

After sending the letter to Australia, he supplied two copies to the British Munitions Minister David Lloyd George, with his letter of introduction from Andrew Fisher. Very quickly, Murdoch's letter reached Asquith and was circulated to senior ministers of the British government. Ashmead-Bartlett, expelled from the Dardanelles, reached London about this time and soon, thanks to the influence of Lord Northcliffe, proprietor of The Times, The Daily Mirror and other national newspapers, his version of events began to be published. Murdoch, initially alarmed that Northcliffe's staff had obtained a copy of his private letter, soon became a friend of the newspaper tycoon. Although his letter, written from memory, contained many mistakes and exaggerations, the main points were supported by other evidence. Hamilton was relieved of command. The subsequent operation to evacuate the troops from Gallipoli in December was accomplished with perfect effectiveness.

In 1917, while visiting the Western Front as an unofficial war correspondent, Murdoch attempted to conduct negotiations with Field Marshal Douglas Haig in support of the Australian government's policy of the Australian Imperial Force (A.I.F.) divisions to be brought together into a united Australian Corps. Although Murdoch pushed for the appointment of Major General Brudenell White as the new corps commander while denigrating Major General John Monash, who was of Jewish German ancestry, Monash was given command when the Australian Corps was formed in 1918.

Along with official war correspondent Charles Bean, Murdoch continued to lobby for Monash's demotion by appealing directly to Australian Prime Minister Billy Hughes, and misleading him into the belief that the A.I.F.'s senior officers were strongly opposed to Monash. When Hughes visited the front just before the Battle of Hamel intending to replace Monash, he first consulted the same senior officers and discovered that their support for their commander was strongly positive and that Monash's powers of planning and execution were excellent. The successful Hamel assault closed the question of Monash's suitability. Later in 1918, Murdoch again attempted to convince Hughes that Monash should not control the repatriation of Australian troops.

=== Melbourne Herald ===
Murdoch remained in London, expanding the cable service, writing influential journalism—and helping his friend Hughes on visits to England—until he was offered the post of chief editor at the Melbourne Herald, which he took in January 1921. Arranging for the paper's general manager to be demoted, he began applying Lord Northcliffe's principles, with frequent advice from Northcliffe himself. As he had in London, he focused on political controversy, but he also made the Herald influential in other ways, through such devices as improved arts coverage, and celebrity contributions.

When Hugh Denison, proprietor of the Sydney Sun, tried to break into the Melbourne market with the Sun News-Pictorial in 1922, Murdoch fought a long campaign which eventually resulted in the Herald, its own circulation up by 50%, taking over the new tabloid in 1925. He acquired the nickname "Lord Southcliffe" and in 1928 became managing director of the company, by which time the Sun was on its way to becoming Australia's highest-selling newspaper.

In 1927, he saw a photograph of an attractive 18-year-old débutante, Elisabeth Joy Greene, in Table Talk magazine, and arranged for a friend to introduce him. She became Mrs Elisabeth Murdoch in June 1928, honeymooning on his Cruden Farm estate at Langwarrin. They had children Helen (later Mrs Geoff Handbury), Rupert Murdoch, Anne (later Mrs Milan Kantor) and Janet, now Mrs John Calvert-Jones. In the early years of World War I he had been engaged for a time to Isabel Law, daughter of the British Chancellor of the Exchequer and future prime minister Bonar Law.

From 1926 onward, Murdoch had led a campaign to take over newspapers elsewhere in Australia, with varying success. In Adelaide, for example, the Herald publisher took over the feeble The Register in 1928, and turned it into a Sun-style picture tabloid. Within months, the previously dominant Adelaide Advertiser accepted a takeover bid, and The Register was quietly closed down in 1931, after the Herald acquired the evening Adelaide News, securing a local monopoly. Murdoch had also been investing in newspapers on his own account, notably in Brisbane, where he bought shares in the Daily Mail and which was subsequently merged with the rival Courier.

=== 1930s and after ===
Murdoch kept pace with new technology, and by 1935 the Herald was involved with 11 radio stations (while Murdoch campaigned to prevent the official Australian Broadcasting Commission from establishing its own news service). He also led both the merger of rival cable services to form Australian Associated Press Ltd in 1935, and a project to build a paper-mill in Tasmania.

In the Depression of the early 1930s, Murdoch's papers campaigned against the Labor Party government of James Scullin, and gave full support to the breakaway ex-Labor politician Joseph Lyons in his successful 1931 campaign to become prime minister. He received a knighthood in July 1933, and being an art connoisseur with an appreciation of modern work, became a trustee of Victoria's museums and galleries.

He later had some regrets about his support for the strong-willed Lyons, stating in 1936, "I put him there and I'll put him out". Meanwhile, others were expressing deep concern about the dangers of concentrating so much press power in the hands of one person. This came to a head after Australia became involved in the Second World War. In June 1940, Murdoch was appointed to a newly created Australian Government post, Director-General of Information, and on 18 July he obtained authorisation to compel all news media to publish Government statements as and when necessary. Comparisons were made with Goebbels, press co-operation was swiftly withdrawn, politicians protested, and despite agreements to modify the regulation, in November he was obliged to resign the post.

The Herald Exhibition of French and British Contemporary Art (1939–1945), recognised as momentous in Australian art history, was launched in October 1939, as the Second World War began. The organising body and sponsor was the Herald under its managing director Murdoch who argued, in convincing the Board of the newspaper to finance an exhibition of European modern art, that "Gallipoli had given us one kind of maturity. A great Herald exhibition of contemporary French and British art would give us another kind of maturity." The exhibition, curated by Basil Burdett, was seen widely in a series of shows across the eastern states and took place during, and in opposition to, efforts to establish the Australian Academy of Art, a conservative Australian government-authorised art organisation which operated from 1937 to 1946 and staged annual exhibitions.

Returning to the newspapers, from which he had agreed to distance himself while serving the Government, he spent the rest of the war encouraging a patriotic spirit, and attacking the Labor Prime Minister, John Curtin, who led a minority government in 1941, and was re-elected with a dramatic majority in 1943. In 1942 he became chairman of the Herald group, and in 1944, maintaining his connection with the art world, he established the Herald Chair of Fine Arts at the University of Melbourne. The following year he became chairman of the trustees of the National Gallery of Victoria.

In 1948 Murdoch was the main driver to establish the American Australian Association, which continues to the present day.

Becoming increasingly ill with cancer, he retired from most of his work except the Herald in 1949, and made a deal with the Herald board to buy control of the Adelaide newspapers, in return for first option in any future sale of his Brisbane newspaper shares.

== Death and legacy ==
Murdoch died at the family property, Cruden Farm, Langwarrin, Victoria, in the night of 4–5 October 1952. His funeral service was held at Toorak Presbyterian Church. Much of his estate, valued for probate at £410,004 (equivalent to $17,000,000 in 2022), was disposed of to pay off mortgages, death duties etc. The Herald exercised its option to buy the Brisbane newspaper shares, but his family was still left with full control of News Limited, proprietors of the Adelaide News.

The Sir Keith Murdoch Award for Excellence in Journalism has been awarded to a News Corp Australia journalist each year.

== In popular culture ==
- In the 1985 mini series ANZACS, Murdoch was portrayed by Australian actor David Bradshaw.
- In 2015 mini series Gallipoli, Murdoch was portrayed by Australian actor Damon Gameau.
- In the 2015 television docudrama Australia: The Story of Us, he was portrayed by Australian actor Matt Boesenberg.
- In the 2015 television mini series Deadline Gallipoli, made for the Foxtel network, he was portrayed by Australian actor Ewen Leslie.
- In the 2015 television docudrama Gallipoli: When Murdoch Went to War, Murdoch was portrayed by actor Simon Harrison.

== See also ==
- The Herald and Weekly Times Ltd
- The Herald (Melbourne)
- The Sun News-Pictorial

== Principal sources ==
=== General ===
- Australian Dictionary of Biography Murdoch, Sir Keith Arthur (1885–1952) published by Australian National University, ISSN 1833-7538
- Tom D C Roberts Before Rupert: Keith Murdoch and the Birth of a Dynasty University of Queensland Press, 2015, ISBN 9780702253782

=== Early life and First World War ===
- Patriots Three ABC Australia documentary script
- Perry, Roland (2004). Monash: The Outsider who Won A War. Random House. ISBN 1-74051-364-9.
