= Rosehearty =

Coordinates: 57.6967703°N 2.1143495°W

Rosehearty: Scottish Gaelic: Ros Abhartaich; Scots: Rizartie
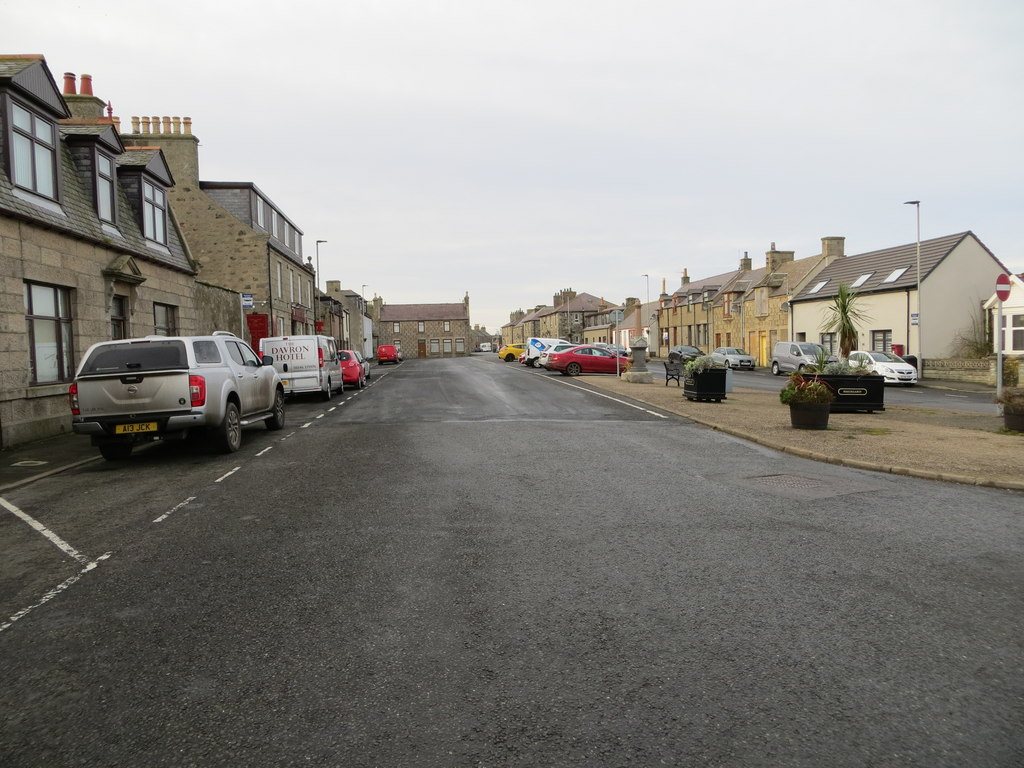
- The Square (B9031)

- Location within Aberdeenshire
- Population: 1,230 (2020)
- Council area: Aberdeenshire
- Lieutenancy area: Aberdeenshire
- Country: Scotland
- Sovereign state: United Kingdom
- Post town: Fraserburgh
- Postcode district: AB43
- Police: Scotland
- Fire: Scottish
- Ambulance: Scottish
- UK Parliament: Aberdeenshire North and Moray East
- Scottish Parliament: Banffshire and Buchan Coast

Rosehearty (Scottish Gaelic: Ros Abhartaich; Scots: Rizartie) is a settlement on the Moray Firth coast, four miles west of the town Fraserburgh, in the historical county of Aberdeenshire in Scotland. The burgh has a population of approximately 1,300 with about 25 per cent of pensionable age.

== Etymology ==
The name Rosehearty was documented in 1508 as Rossawarty and is derived from Gaelic ros, meaning "cape, headland", and the personal name Abhartach.

== History ==
The settlement which is now Rosehearty was founded by a group of shipwrecked Danes in the 14th century. In 1424 the Fraser family built Pitsligo Castle a few hundred yards inland at Pitsligo; the castle was enlarged by the Forbes family in 1570. The remains of the castle are visible from Rosehearty.

Alexander Forbes, 1st Lord Forbes of Pitsligo re-founded the settlement to encourage fishing, on the condition he was given one-fifth of the catch. Rosehearty did not officially exist until it was granted a charter in the 1680s by King Charles II.

The town thrived from the fishing boom and, prior to the arrival of railways at the Broch, "was set fit to rival it". Ultimately, however, the railway gave Fraserburgh the edge, and Rosehearty's fishing industry ended.

The Annual Reports of the Fishery Board for Scotland provide an insight into the fishing in Rosehearty in the years before the First World War. The report for 1900 states that while there was a decrease in local net and line fishing "ten crews were at great line fishing at Tobermory early in the year and did well. Part of the fishermen fished for herrings at Shetland, Fraseburgh and Yarmouth." The report for 1913 states that there was "an increase of 2 steam drifters. Fishermen belonging to this section had a prosperous year."

Fishery Statistics

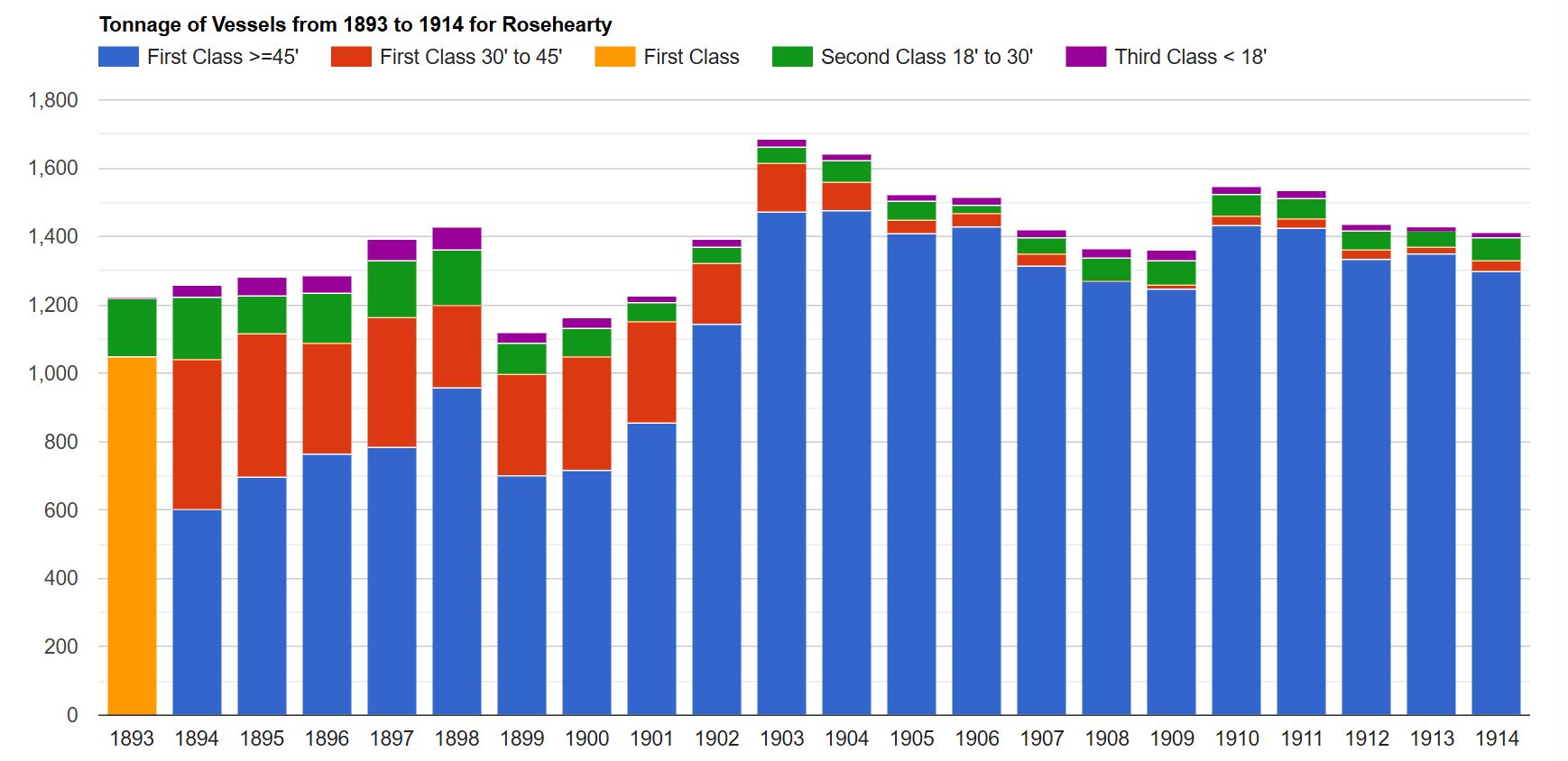
Tonnage of vessels

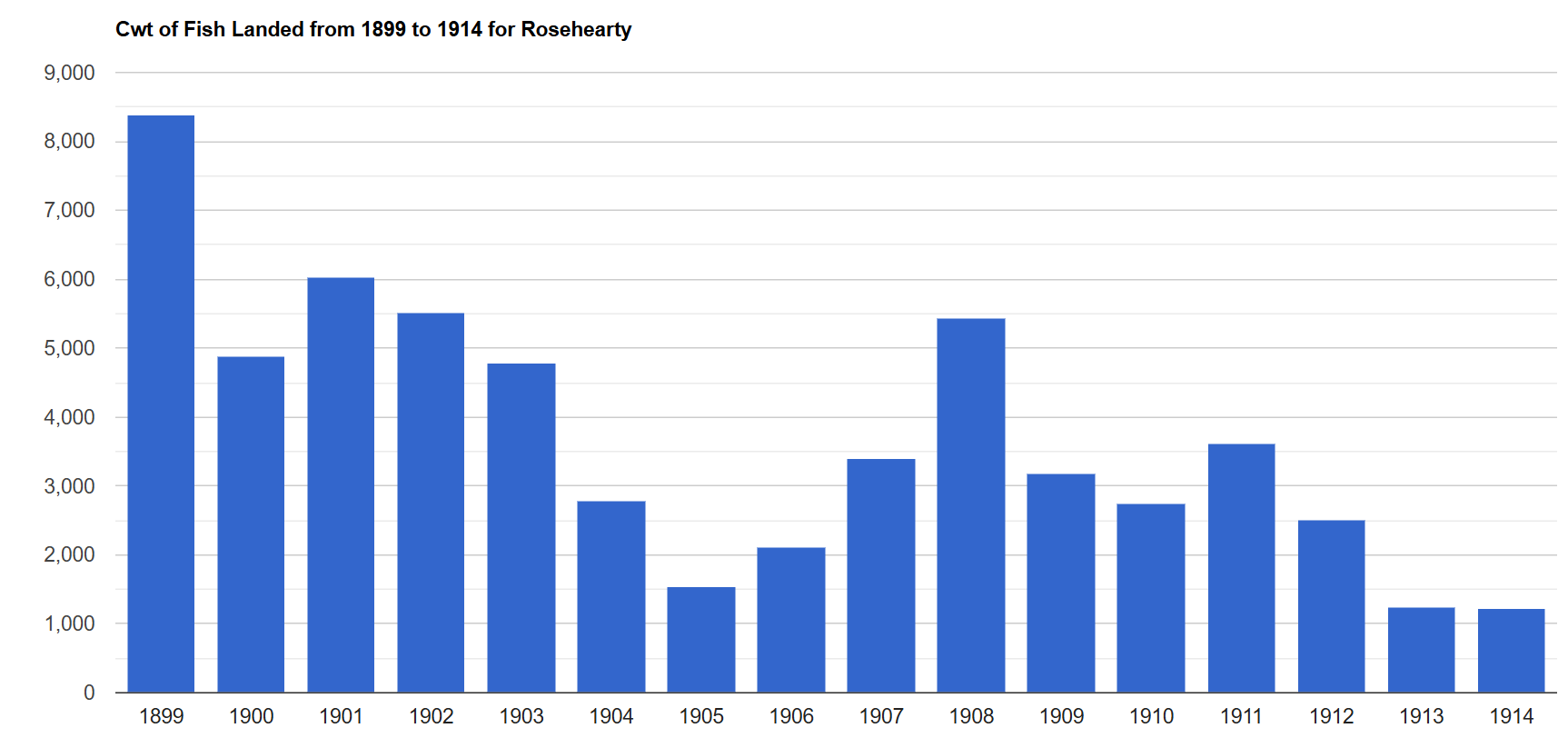
Cwt of fish landed

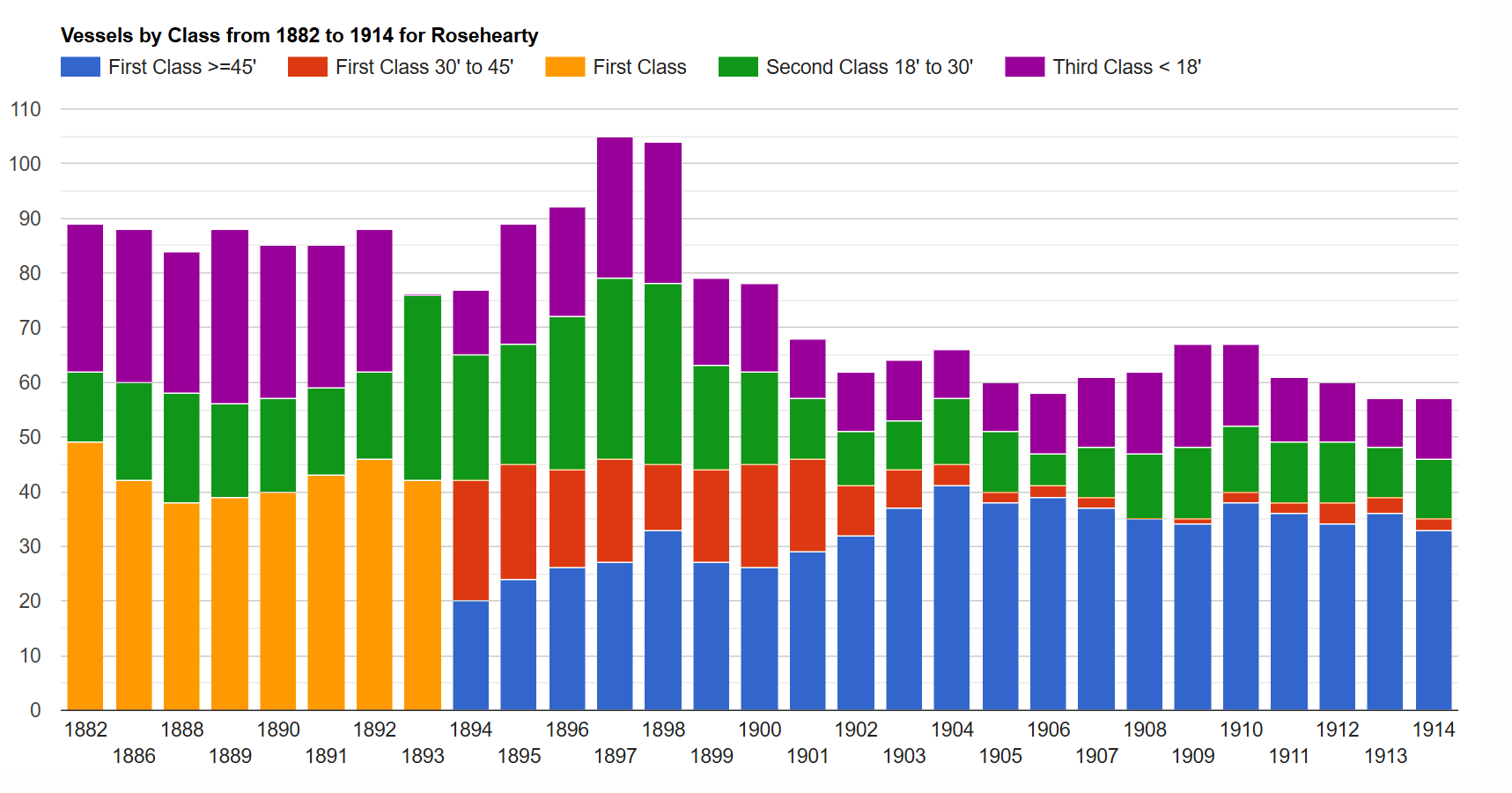
Vessels by class

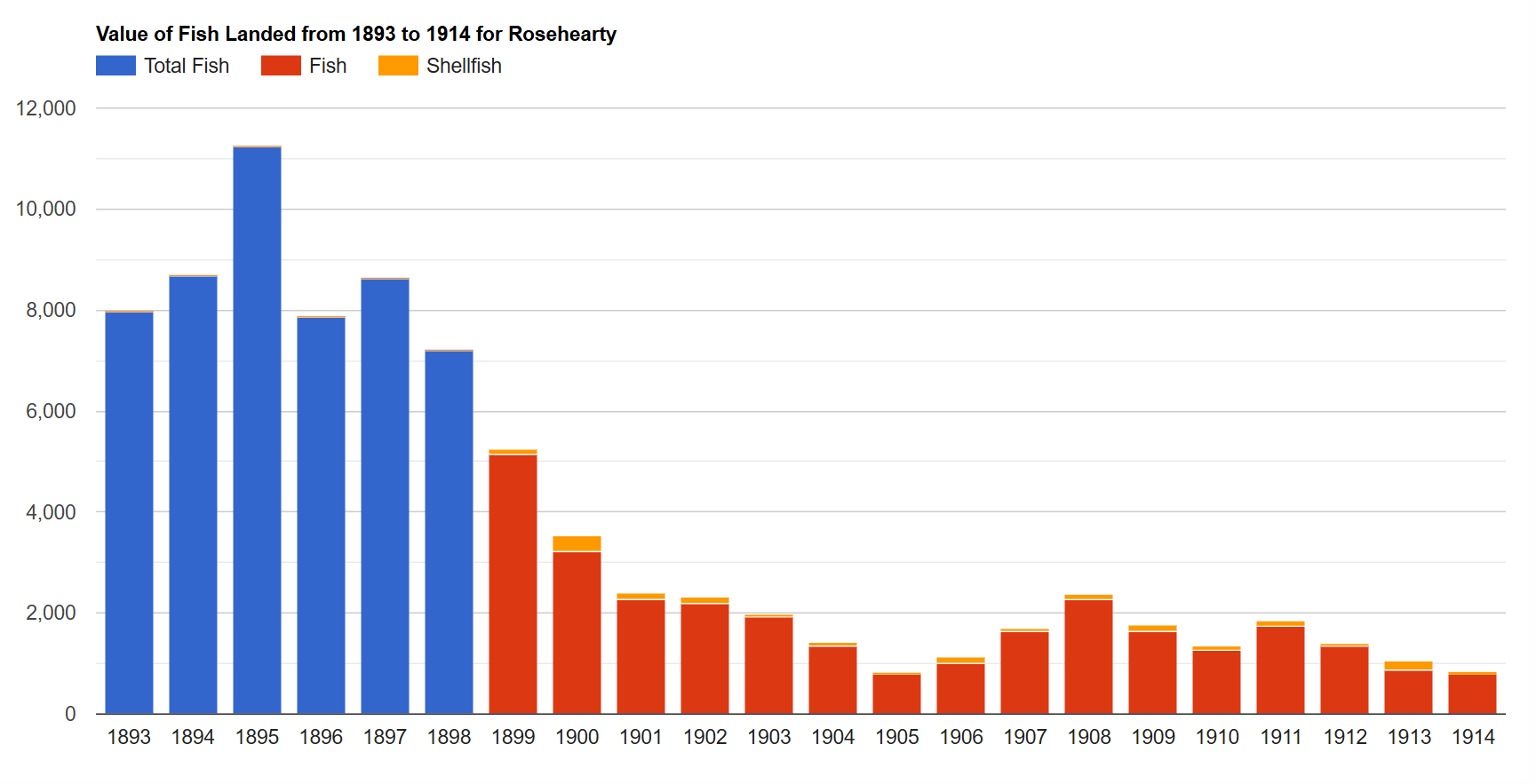
Value (£) of fish landed

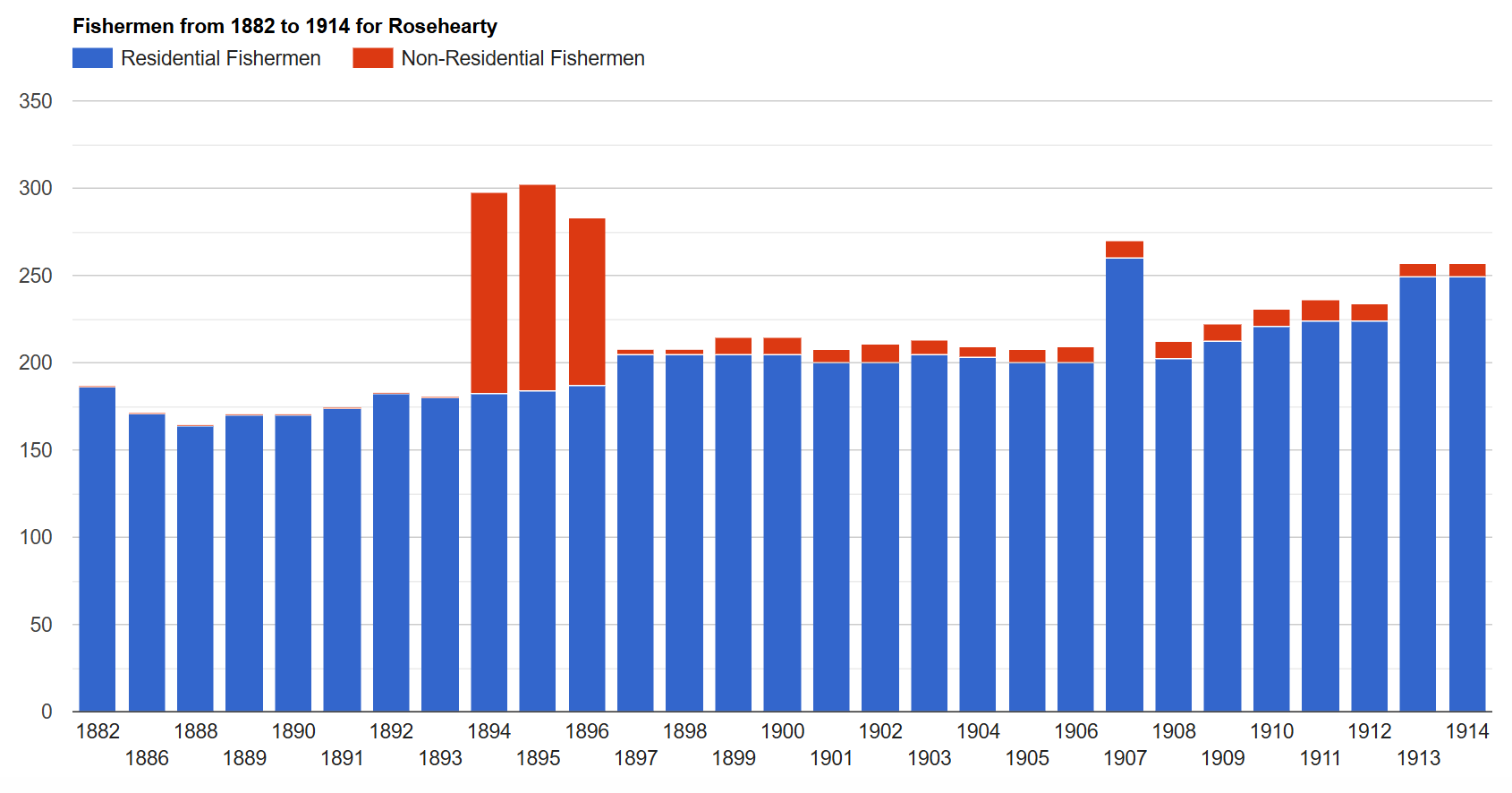
Fishermen

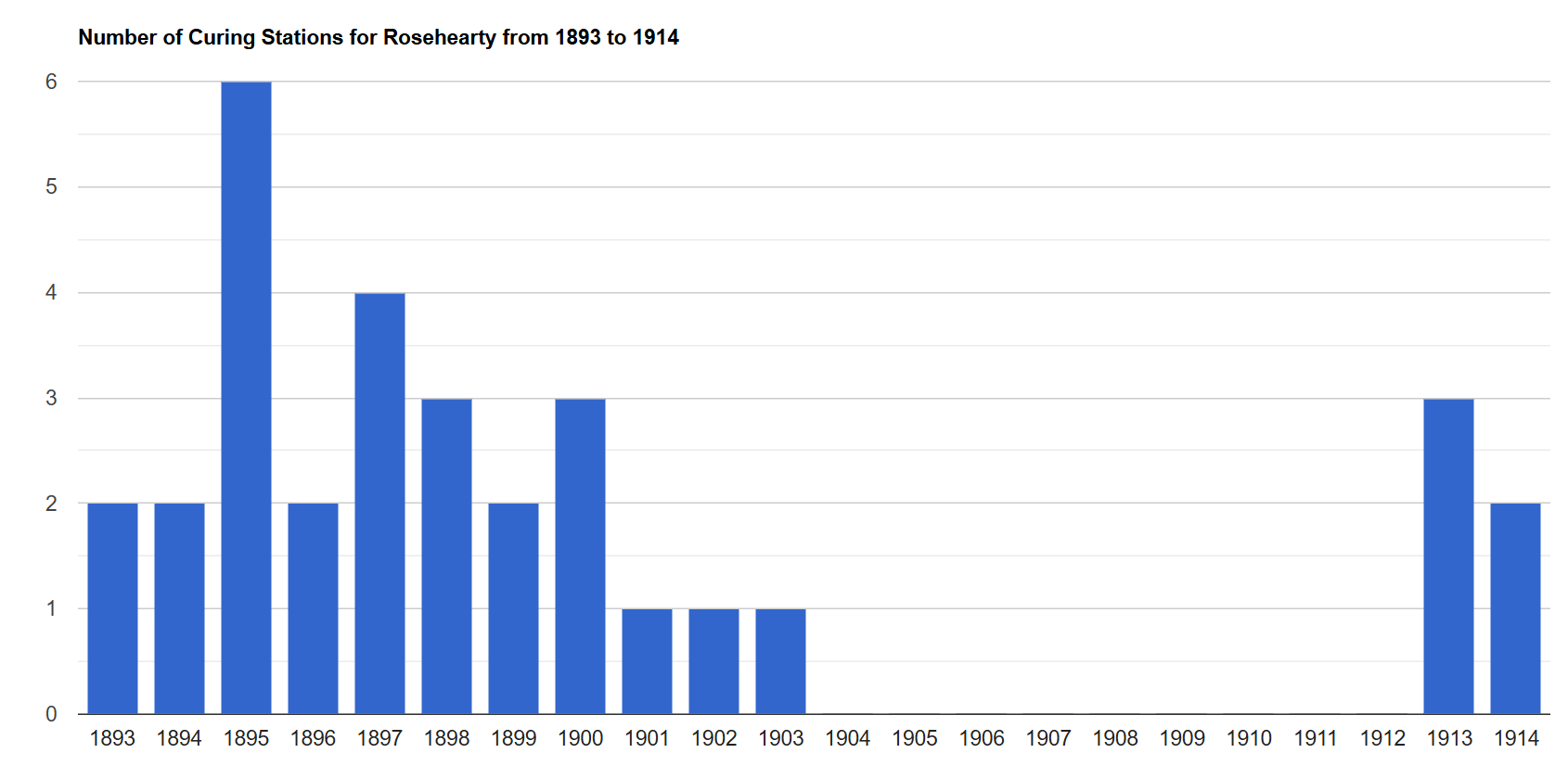
Number of curing stations

== Geography ==
Rosehearty Beach forms a crescent shape stretching east from the harbour to a group of rocky outcrops. Several rock formations in the area are known as Long Craig, Hungry Hoy, The Pen, Mounsie Weat, Tamhead, Warey Craigs and Damar.

== Architecture ==
The Lodging House, on the south side of the Square, was built in 1753 for the dowager Lady Pitsligo, while another old house, the "Jam", bears the date 1573.

The Hill of Rosehearty Church, constructed in 1890, the work of Alexander Marshall Mackenzie, features a loft that was formerly installed in the church of Pitsligo in 1634. Described by Charles McKean as "magnificent", it was later moved and installed in the Hill Church.

== Facilities ==
There is one shop, a hairdresser and two hotels in the village.

A new modern Rosehearty Primary School was built in 2007 and accommodates seven classrooms, an ICT computer suite and a games hall with retractable theatre seating and complementary acoustics and lighting. The school caters for approximately 140-160 pupils in total.

== Notable people ==
Rosehearty is the birthplace of:

- Hugh Mercer (1726–1777), British/American soldier and physician
- Sir Walter Murdoch (1874–1970), Australian essayist and academic
- Lawrence Ogilvie (1898–1980), plant pathologist

Allan Watt Downie FRS[1] (5 September 1901 – 26 January 1988)[2] was a Scottish microbiologist involved in the eradication of smallpox.[3] He was elected a Fellow of the Royal Society in March 1955.[1]

== Gallery ==
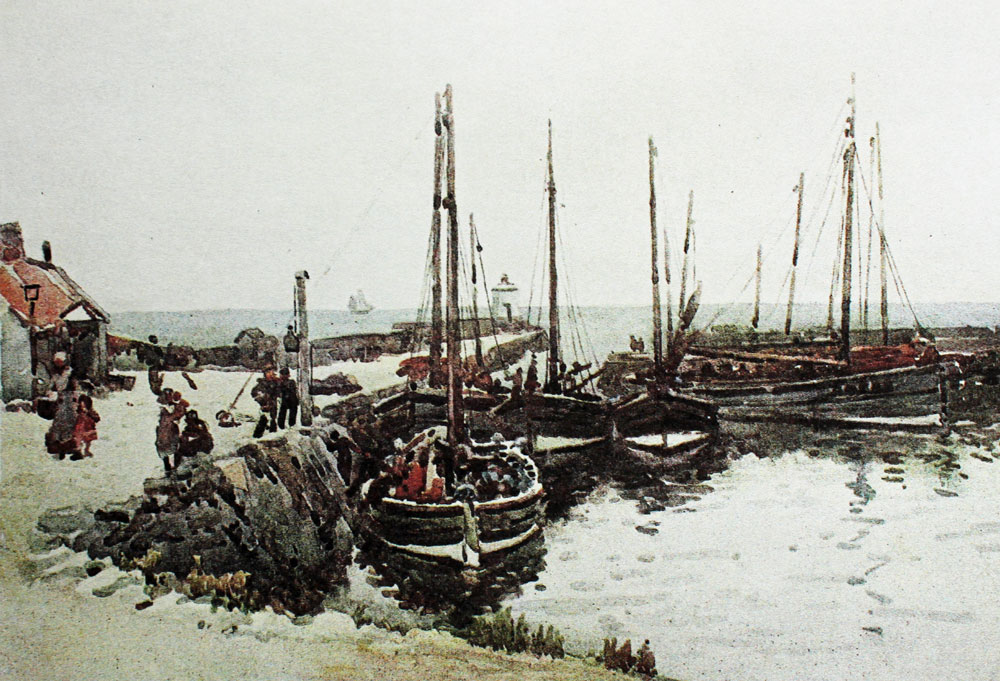
Reproduction of a watercolour painting of Rosehearty, 2 September 1905 (Robert Weir Allan)

The Grey North Sea oil painting by Archibald Reid (1844–1908) of Rosehearty's pier before the pier extension in about 1895 that included the new lighthouse known as Tam Hied
