= Monkton, Brisbane =

Monkton
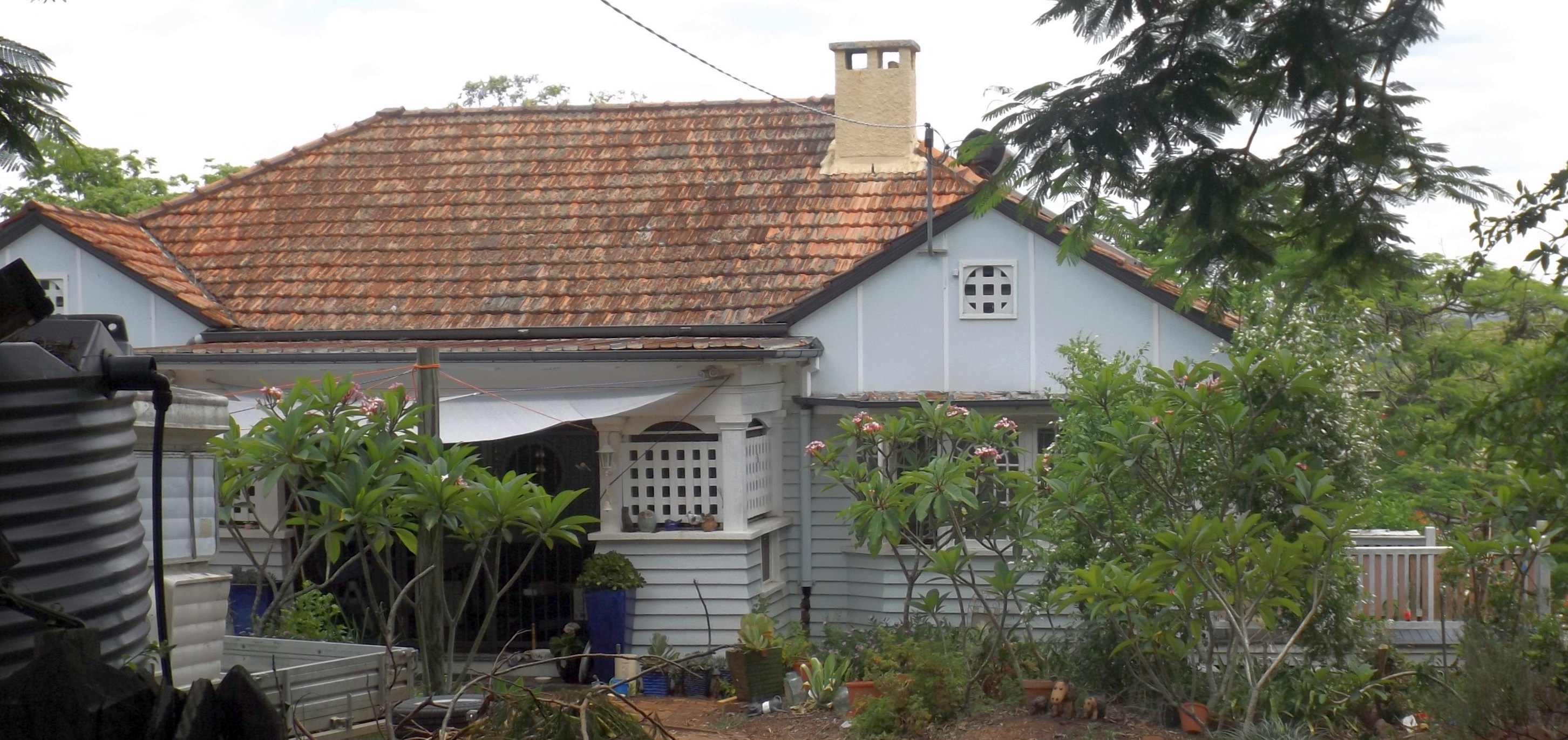
- Monkton, 2014

- Location within Queensland
- 27.5451°S 152.9749°E
- Location: 7 Ardoyne Road, Corinda, City of Brisbane, Queensland, Australia

History
- Design period: 1919–1930s (Interwar period)
- Built: 1925
- Built for: William and Margaret Dunlop

Site notes
- Architect: Elina Mottram

Queensland Heritage Register
- Official name: Monkton
- Type: state heritage
- Designated: 31 July 2008
- Reference no.: 601170
- Type: Residential: Detached house
- Theme: Building settlements, towns, cities and dwellings: Dwellings

Monkton is a heritage-listed timber-framed domestic house at 7 Ardoyne Road, Corinda, City of Brisbane, Queensland, Australia. It was designed by Elina Mottram and built in 1925 for William and Margaret Dunlop. It is designed by Elina Emily Mottram, who was the first woman in Queensland to establish her own architectural practice. It is historically significant because of its association with the entry of women into the local professions in Queensland, especially so into the architectural profession. It was added to the Queensland Heritage Register on 31 July 2008.

Monkton is located at the northern end of Ardoyne Road at Corinda. It has a symmetrical front that comprises double-sided gables that face the road on both sides of a projecting porch. Bay windows flank either sides of the porch. These architectural qualities are significant as they are still intact in form and detailing of a timber residence.

Monkton has been described as having a focus on utility and comfort, which she credits as attributes of Mottram's early work. She quotes Florence Taylor as saying, "Men build houses but women build homes" and Beatrice Hutton's statement, "Men don't know how to build houses for women. Think of the cupboards that are either left out or put in the wrong place! And there are many details that only a woman can understand."

These details include early built-in joinery cabinets that can be found throughout the house. A linen press extends to the ceiling in the hallway, a former servery, cupboards and a pantry/broom cupboard extends to the ceiling in the kitchen, a wardrobe with storage cupboards extends to the ceiling in the main bedroom and a cupboard in the parlor. All rooms in Monkton have walls lined with v-jointed boards and ceilings of fiber-cement with cover strips.

Monkton is one of only a few surviving examples of the work of early women architects in Queensland and one of only three in Brisbane.

== History ==
Monkton is a timber-framed house of modest proportions located in Brisbane's leafy south-west suburbs. It was designed in 1925 by Elina Mottram, Queensland's longest practising early female architect. Of all the buildings designed by early women architects in Brisbane, Monkton is one of only three that remain. It has a symmetrical street-facing façade, carefully detailed interiors and overlooks the Brisbane River to Fig Tree Pocket.

Women gradually entered the architectural profession in the early twentieth century. Architectural training was not easily accessible and women were not readily accepted into the profession. The first woman architect in Australia was Florence Taylor (1879–1969) who, despite applying for admittance to the Institute of Architects of New South Wales in 1907, was denied acceptance until 1920 due to her gender. Women such as Taylor generally came from relatively privileged backgrounds and were often exposed to the profession by male relatives in architectural practice or in related occupations such as builders or surveyors. In Queensland, though the Brisbane Central Technical College offered some architectural and building subjects and a Diploma in Architecture by 1918, it was not until 1949 that the University of Queensland offered a degree course admitting both men and women.

Prior to this time several women made notable contributions to the architectural profession in Queensland, including Lily Addison (c. 1885-1968), daughter of architect GHM Addison; and Beatrice Hutton, daughter of a surveyor from Rockhampton. Hutton was the first woman to be admitted to an architectural institute in Australia when her application to become an Associate of the Queensland Institute of Architects was accepted in 1916.

It was not until April 1924 that a woman architect opened her own practice in Brisbane, when Elina Mottram established her office in the T&G Building on the corner of Queen and Albert Streets. The Architectural Building Journal of Queensland announced that "Brisbane has at last a lady architect...we trust that she will get her fair share of public support". Today, Elina Mottram is considered the most successful of Queensland's early women architects.

Elina Emily Mottram (1903–1996) was born in Sheffield, England, the only child of Arthur Mottram, a building contractor and stonemason. She came to Brisbane in 1906 with her parents, attending Nundah State School, and later undertook studies in Architecture at the Brisbane Central Technical College while employed by architect F Hall of Brisbane during the city's 1920s construction boom. She received a Diploma in Architecture in 1925.

Mottram taught building construction at the Brisbane Central Technical College between 1926 and 1928. During this time she also worked as an architect in Longreach (1926–1928) and in Rockhampton (1928–1929). In Longreach she designed public and commercial buildings, including the Masonic Temple, Longreach Motors and the office of Winchcombe Carson Ltd. She also remodelled the AWU building and the School of Arts.

Mottram registered as an architect with the Royal Australian Institute of Architects in 1930. During the 1930s depression, when work was scarce, she was a postmistress at Raglan via Rockhampton from 1930 to 1936. In partnership with her father as A and E Mottram, she worked in Rockhampton in 1937 and later in Longreach 1938–1941, where she was foreman of works for her father for the first stage of construction of the Longreach Hospital (1940). She was employed as a draftswoman with the American Army Engineering Office in North Rockhampton in the Second World War. She later worked with the Queensland Railways and designed Eagle Junction railway station.

Other residential commissions by Mottram, included a two-storeyed block of flats in Scott Street at Kangaroo Point c. 1925 (Scott Street Flats), a Tudor Revival residence for Zina Cumbrae-Stewart overlooking the river, and a residence for Mrs Thurlby on the corner of Winchester and Hants Roads, Ascot (now demolished). Of all the buildings designed by early women architects in Queensland (i.e. those practising before World War II) only three survive in Brisbane - Nellie McCredie's house at Wilston (Uanda), the Scott Street Flats and Monkton. In her article, "Designing Women: pioneer architects", historian Judith McKay discusses the manner in which these women designed their buildings. She quotes Florence Taylor as saying "Men build houses but women build homes", and Beatrice Hutton as stating that:

"Men don't know how to build houses for women. Think of the cupboards that are either left out or put in the wrong place! And there are many details that only a woman can understand."

McKay describes a focus on comfort, simplicity and utility with attractive bay windows and ample storage, as attributes of Mottram's early work, including Monkton.

Monkton was built in 1925 on Ardoyne Road to the west of Oxley Road at Corinda for William and Margaret Dunlop who were then only recently married. It was named to commemorate Monkton Farm, William Dunlop's parents' farm which was to the east of Oxley Road.

Margaret Dunlop (née Berrie) grew up across the road from the land on which the house was built. The land belonged to Margaret's parents and was given to the young couple as a wedding gift. The Dunlops commissioned Elina Mottram to design a house for the site. Elina, one of only a handful of women practising at the time, had been recommended to them though apparently they did not choose her particularly because she was a woman. Elina described Margaret Dunlop, who was 19 at the time, as an "exemplary client, intelligent and interested." Mrs Dunlop chose the fittings and hardware and specified that the kitchen be on the north-east. Mottram's original specification of works and materials for Monkton survives, providing a valuable insight into domestic construction practices at the time and Mottram's (and her clients') specific architectural detail requirements.

William and Margaret Dunlop lived at Monkton their whole lives and raised four boys there. When they died the house was left to their son Robert and in 2008 the dwelling remains in the family's possession.

During this time some changes have been made to the property. Between the late 1930s and the mid-1940s the addition of a rear bedroom was made to the house; this is still known as "the new room". Portions of the land were excised, one to the north and one to the west reducing the property to its current size. New kitchen cabinets were added and an internal room was made into a bathroom in the mid-1990s. A built-in bookcase was installed after 2005 along with half-height partition walls in the parlour and main bedroom. A recent timber-framed staircase has been added to the side porch. A recent shade structure has been erected over the front driveway in front of the house.

== Description ==
A timber-framed dwelling, Monkton is located at the northern end of Ardoyne Road at Corinda. It has a symmetrical front comprising double street-facing gables either side of a projecting porch. Bay windows are located in the walls on each side of the porch. The main roof of the house is hipped and the external walls are clad with weatherboards.

The front of the house sits at ground level and the protruding front porch is accessed by a single concrete step. The porch has double tapered posts above sill height with Georgian style mouldings supporting thick verandah plates above. Weatherboard-clad piers rise at each corner with thick sills from which extend the verandah posts. Lattice infill panels are fixed in between the posts below arched valences.

The main roof is clad in Marseilles pattern terracotta tiles. Gabled fascias are narrow in width and are formed from moulded timber. The chimney has a flat cap and two flue openings and is finished with rough cast render which is painted. It has lead flashing to the tiles. Soffits to the main roof are supported by long shaped soffit brackets and are lined with spaced pine battens.

The low pitched roofs to the bay windows and porches are clad in roll-and-pan profile galvanised iron sheeting. All gutters are quad profile. Soffits to the porches and bay windows are supported on small shaped soffit brackets and are lined with fibre cement sheeting. Each of the gables to the street is formed with fibre cement sheeting with vertical batten cover strips. In the centre of each gable is a lattice-formed roof ventilation grill.

The side porch has similar details to front porch but has timber slatted balustrades. A recent landing and timber framed stairs have been added to the side porch.

The bay windows to the street and to the south have casement windows with a central fixed bay with curved glazing bars. The bay window to the north-west has casement windows only. All other windows in the house are multi-paned timber casement windows. Porthole windows are located on the front porch, north elevation and south elevations of the house. External doors to the house (located at the side porch and on the front porch) are panelled timber doors with multi-paned glazing at the top. French doors open onto the front porch.

The house becomes high-set at the rear where the land slopes down to a levelled yard. It is supported on brick piers at the rear and the under-storey area is open.

The house consists of two bedrooms (a main bedroom in the south-east corner and a second bedroom to the south), a sleep-out known as "the new room" (c.1930s-1940s) to the west, a kitchen in the north-east corner, two bathrooms, a hall, a sitting room and a parlour. A side porch off the kitchen provides access to the lower garden to the north via recent stairs.

The front porch provides entry to the parlour which features built-in early cabinets with leadlight glazed doors and recessed bookcases surrounding a face-brick fireplace with concrete hearth. The fireplace projects into the adjacent kitchen where the surface is smooth rendered and painted.

The sitting room features a bay window overlooking the river to the north-west, with a built-in solid timber window seat. Walls are lined with clear-finished timber v-jointed boards to picture rail height. Clear-finished timber panelled doors with cathedral patterned glazing provide access to the hall from the sitting room. A pair of bi-folding doors provides access to the new room to the west.

Early built-in joinery cabinets are located throughout the house including a linen press extending to the ceiling in the hallway, a former servery, cupboards and a pantry/broom cupboard extending to the ceiling in the kitchen, a wardrobe with storage cupboards extending to the ceiling in the main bedroom and a cupboard in the parlour.

All rooms have walls lined with v-jointed boards and ceilings of fibre-cement with cover strips. The main bedroom, parlour and sitting room have plaque rails and cornices are of a similar design. Other rooms have simpler picture rails. Skirtings are clear-finished timber in the parlour, sitting room, new room and main bedroom with simpler beaded skirtings in other rooms.

Floors throughout the house are hardwood except for the hall and the second bedroom, which are pine. The floor to the kitchen is finished with recent ceramic tiles. The flooring in the bathroom to the west is green terrazzo with a black terrazzo border. Many early light fittings and bakelite powerpoints and light switches remain throughout the house.

Additions to the place include a security grille to the front porch, some new kitchen cabinets, a bookcase in the hall and new bathroom fixtures. Recent leadlight windows are located in the internal bathroom.

Other structures on the site include a recent carport on the street boundary to the south-east, a shed to the south, a recent pool fence and a recent rainwater tank in the south-west corner. A recent shade structure is located over the driveway immediately in front of the house. These other structures are not considered of cultural heritage significance.

An early concrete fish pond sits within the pool fence at the rear of the house.

There are views from the rear of the property along the Brisbane River to the west towards Seventeen Mile Rocks and across to Fig Tree Pocket. Mature trees provide a foreground to the house along Ardoyne Road and a mature jacaranda shades the garden to the south-west. There are several garden beds and other plantings throughout the garden.

== Heritage listing ==
Monkton was listed on the Queensland Heritage Register on 31 July 2008 having satisfied the following criteria.

The place is important in demonstrating the evolution or pattern of Queensland's history.

Monkton, a timber-framed dwelling constructed in 1925, is significant for its association with the entry of women into the professions in Queensland, particularly into the architectural profession. Women began to establish careers in architecture in Queensland from the early 1900s, initially working in male-owned practices. In 1924 Elina Mottram, the designer of Monkton, became the first woman in Queensland to establish her own architectural practice.

The place demonstrates rare, uncommon or endangered aspects of Queensland's cultural heritage.

Monkton remains substantially intact in form and detailing. It is rare as one of only a few surviving examples of the work of early women architects in Queensland and one of only three in Brisbane.

The place is important because of its aesthetic significance.

Monkton is significant for its aesthetic and architectural qualities as a highly intact, well composed and refined example of a timber residence. These qualities are reflected in its symmetrical street frontage and distinctive exterior and interior detailing. Monkton's elevated situation overlooking the Brisbane River through mature trees creates an idyllic setting and the large garden surrounding the house adds to its picturesque character.

The place has a special association with the life or work of a particular person, group or organisation of importance in Queensland's history.

Monkton has a special association with the work of Elina Mottram, Queensland's longest-practising early female architect and the first woman to open her own architectural practice in Brisbane. The survival of the 1925 specification of works and materials for Monkton, combined with the integrity of the place, aids understanding of Mottram's work. The detailing of the interior joinery is highly characteristic of her domestic work.

== See also ==
- Australian residential architectural styles
- Elina Mottram
