= Elina Mottram =

Elina Emily Mottram
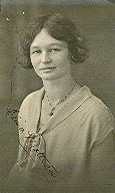
- Born: Elina Emily Mottram; 1903; Sheffield, England
- Died: 1996 (aged 92–93)
- Education: Brisbane Central Technical College
- Occupation: Architect
- Parent: Arthur Mottram

Elina Emily Mottram (1903–1996) was an England-born architect trained in Brisbane. She was Queensland’s first and longest practicing female architect, practicing and establishing her own business in Brisbane from 1924 to 1975. Mottram died at the age of 93 in 1996.

== Early life and education ==
Elina Mottram was born in 1903 in Sheffield, England as the only child of Arthur Mottram, a building contractor and stonemason. She arrived in Brisbane in 1906 with her parents and started school at Nundah State School.

After finishing her studies at the state school, Mottram then undertook studies in Architecture at the Brisbane Central Technical College while simultaneously employed by architect Francis Richard Hall of Brisbane during the city’s 1920s construction boom.

She graduated with a diploma in Architecture in 1925.

Elina Mottram opened her own practice in an office in the T&G Building on the corner of Queen Street and Albert Street in Brisbane in April 1924. The Architectural Building Journal of Queensland announced that "Brisbane has at last a lady architect... we trust that she will get her fair share of public support".

== Teaching ==
As well as running her own architectural business, Elina Mottram taught building construction at her alma mater between 1926 and 1928.

== Architectural work ==
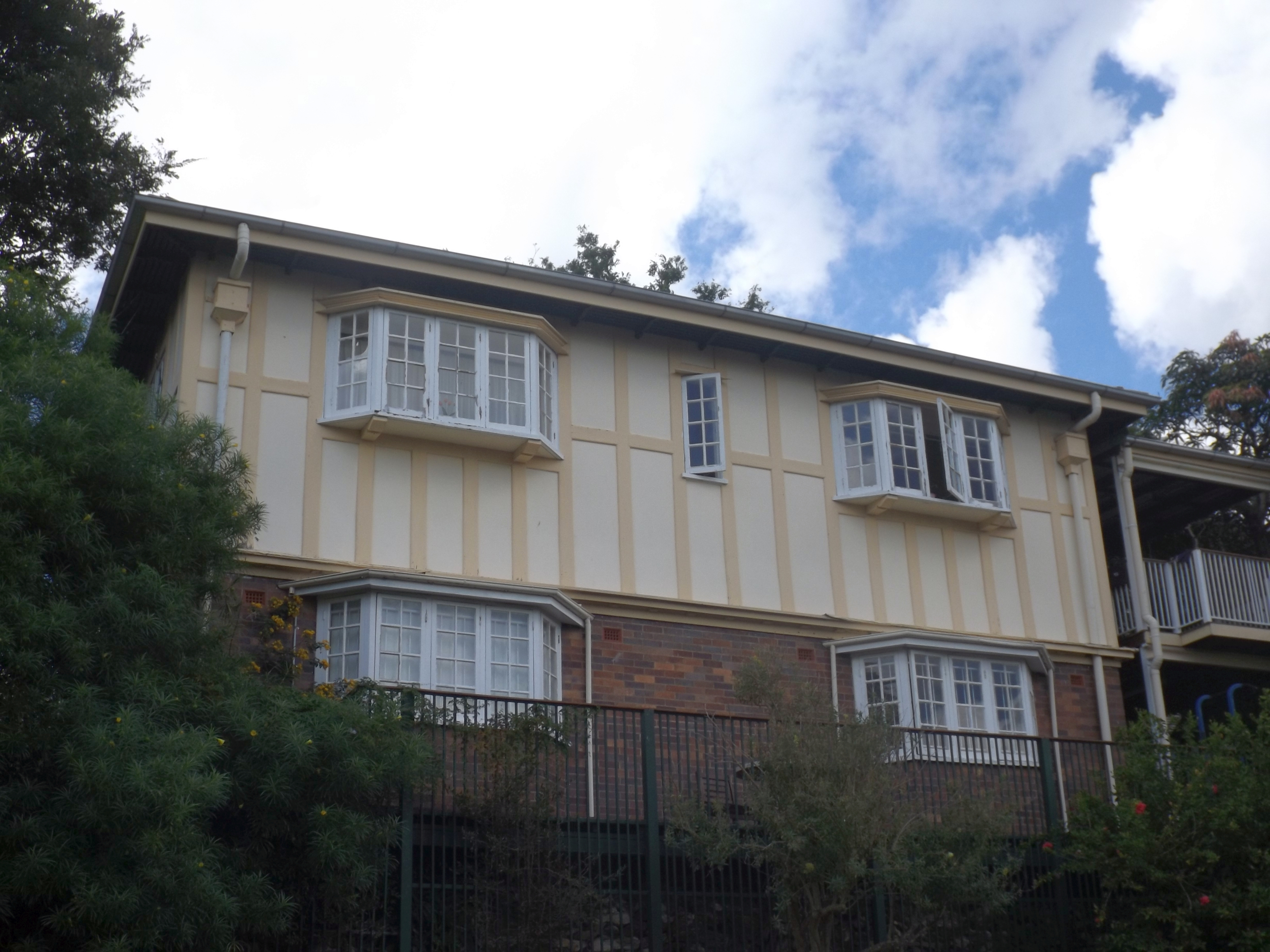
Scott Street Flats, viewed from the river bank below, 2015

In August 1924, the year she opened her practice, Elina Mottram designed a block of four flats at Moray Street New Farm for her client Frank Elliot and called for the tenders for the constructed building with specific requirements for reinforced concrete.

Elina designed a Tudor revival style residence for Zina Beatrice Selwyn Cumbrae-Stewart (an impassioned community worker whose husband Francis William Sutton Cumbrae-Stewart later became the registrar of the University of Queensland). Later called the Scott Street Flats it is one of the two remaining of Mottram’s architecture that still stands. These units boast of views to the Brisbane River and modern community-friendly walkways that were stylish during the 1920s with its use of wide bay windows and a distinctive view across to the Brisbane’s Custom house.

Elina Mottram also worked as an architect in Longreach from 1926 to 1928 and in Rockhampton from 1928 to 1929.

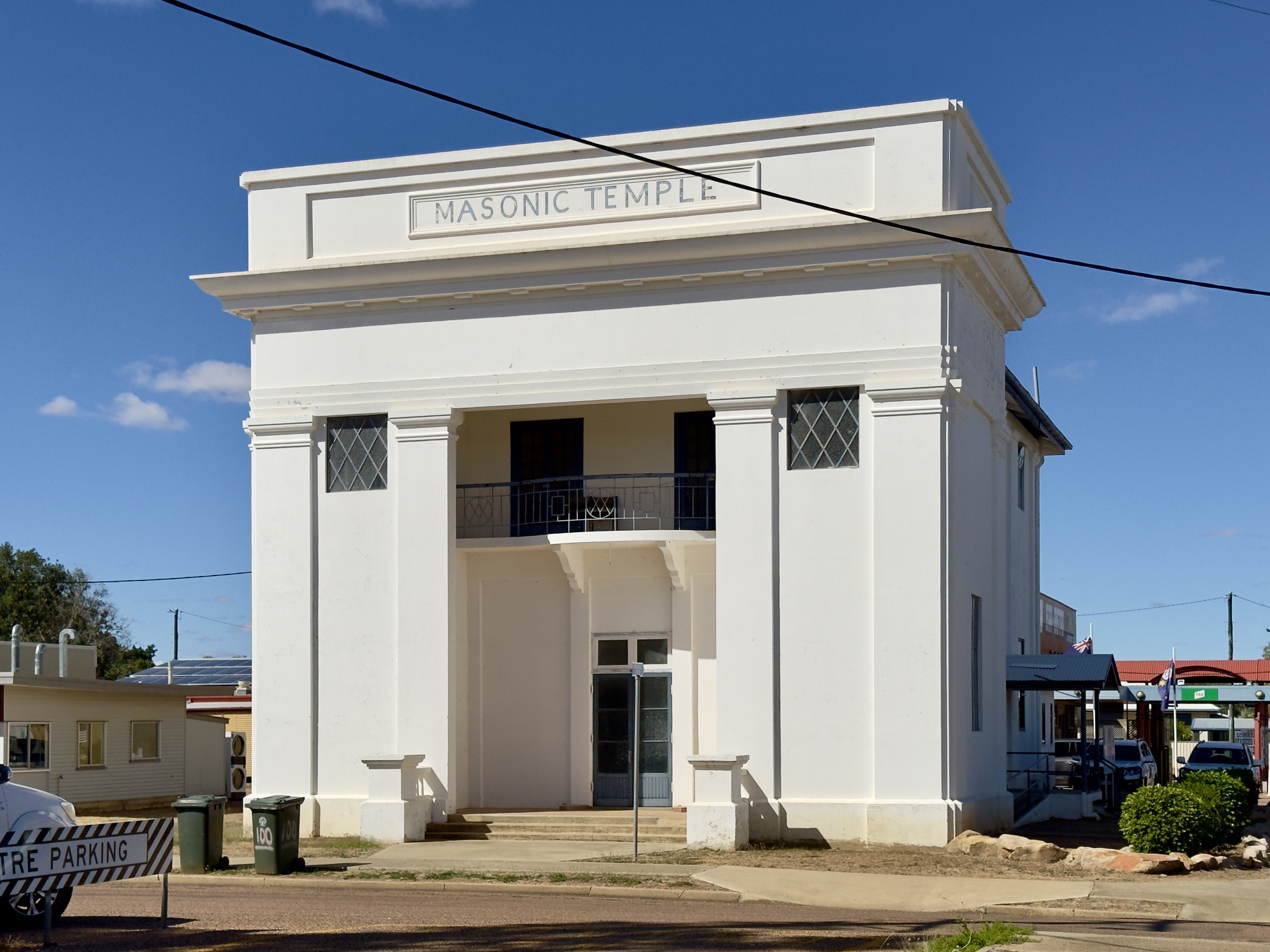
Masonic Temple (1930) Longreach, QLD

In Longreach, she designed civic public buildings that include the Masonic Temple, Longreach Motors and the office of Winchcombe Carson Ltd. Evidence of her work also include the remodelling of the Australian Workers' Union building and the School of Arts.

Her architecture career was stalled during the 1930s depression shortly after Mottram registered as an architect with the Royal Australian Institute of Architects in 1930. During this period, she worked as a postmistress at Raglan via Rockhampton till 1936.

In partnership with her father, as A & E Mottram, she worked in Rockhampton in 1937 and later in Longreach 1938–1941. During this period, she played the role of foreman of works for her father in support for the first stage of construction of the Longreach Hospital (completed 1940). She was later employed as a draftswoman with the American Army Engineering Office in North Rockhampton in World War II.

After the war, Mottram became the first woman architect to work with the Queensland Railways and designed the Eagle Junction railway station.

Other residential commissions by Mottram include a two-storeyed block of flats in Scott Street at Kangaroo Point c1925, a Tudor revival residence for Zina Cumbrae-Stewart overlooking the river, and a residence for Mrs Thurlby on the corner of Winchester and Hants Roads Ascot (now demolished).

=== Notable projects ===
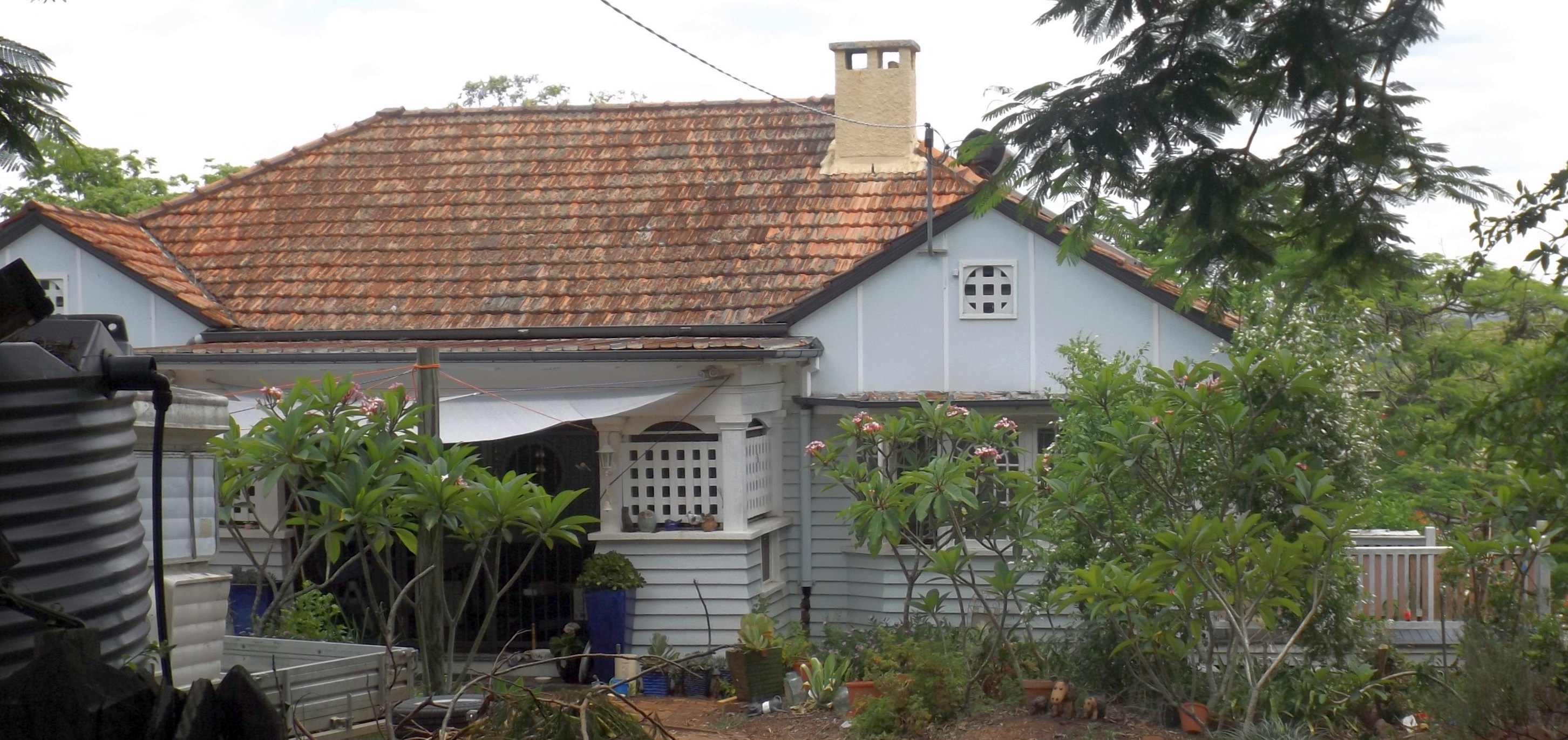
Monkton, Corinda, 2015

Two of Mottram's works are listed on the Queensland Heritage Register:

- Scott Street Flats, Kangaroo Point
- Monkton (1925), Corinda, Queensland

Of all the buildings designed by Mottram before World War II, only two survive in Brisbane - the Scott Street Flats and Monkton. Monkton was built in 1925 on Ardoyne Road to the west of Oxley Road at Corinda for William and Margaret Dunlop, who were then only recently married. It was named to commemorate Monkton Farm, William Dunlop's parents' farm which was to the east of Oxley Road.

Monkton has a distinct association to Elina Mottram’s work the survival of the 1925 specifications of works and materials that she used with design. The detailing of the interior joinery such as walls that are lined with v-jointed boards and ceilings of fibre-cement with cover strips are characteristic of Mottram’s domestic work.

== See also ==
- List of Australian architects
- Women in architecture
