= Uanda =

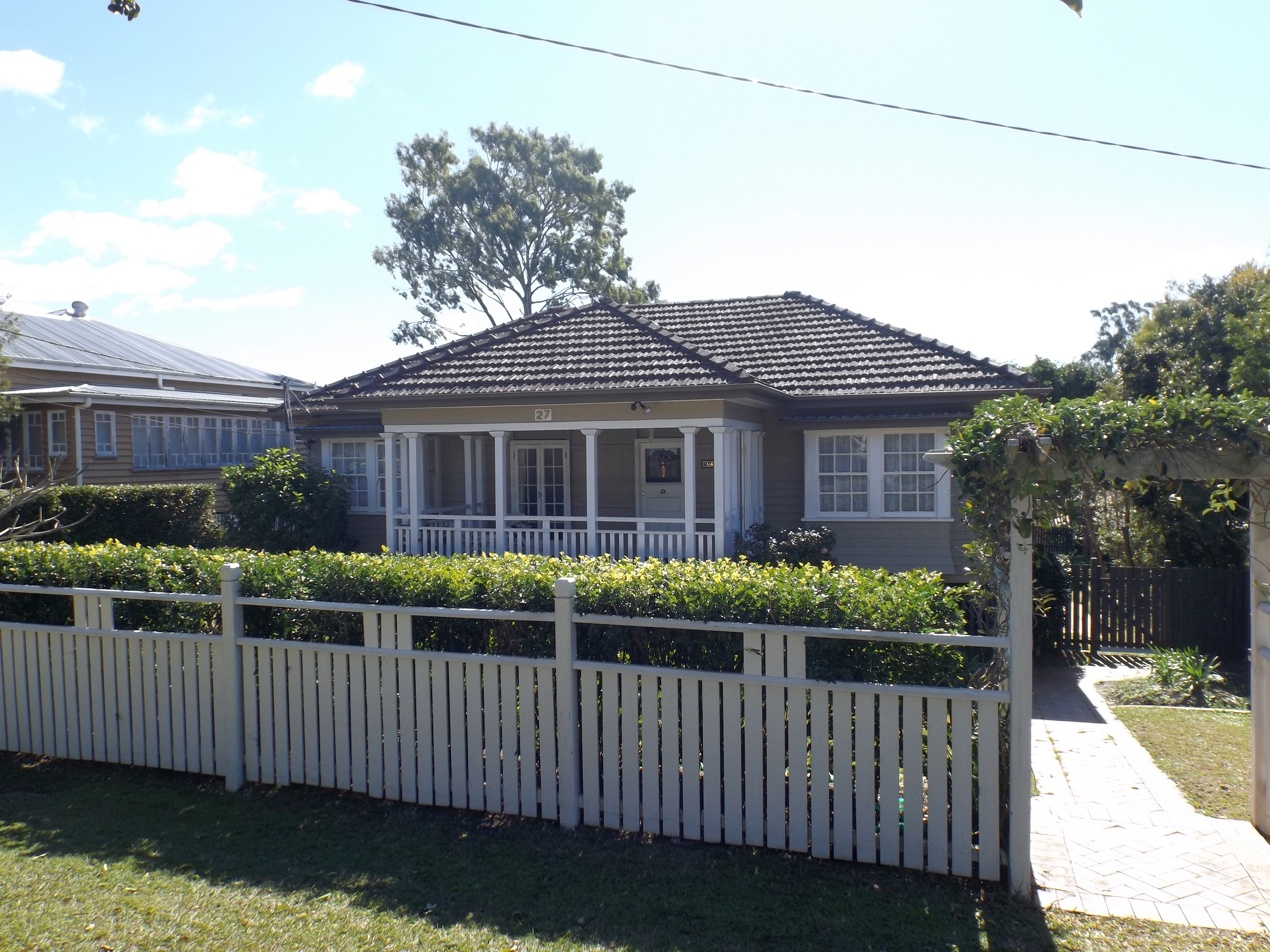
- 2015

- Location within Queensland Location within Australia
- 27.438°S 153.0202°E
- Location: 27 Clifton Street, Wilston, City of Brisbane, Queensland, Australia

History
- Design period: 1919–1930s (interwar period)
- Built: 1928

Site notes
- Architect: Nellie McCredie

Queensland Heritage Register
- Official name: Uanda
- Type: state heritage (built, landscape)
- Designated: 24 March 2000
- Reference no.: 601156
- Significant period: 1920s (fabric, historical)
- Significant components: residential accommodation – main house, furniture/fittings, garage

Uanda is a heritage-listed detached house at 27 Clifton Street, Wilston, City of Brisbane, Queensland, Australia. It was designed by Nellie McCredie and built in 1928. It was added to the Queensland Heritage Register on 24 March 2000.

== History ==
Uanda, a low-set timber cottage built in 1928, is situated on two blocks originally part of Suburban Allotment No. 21 granted to Michael O'Neill in 1855. The Allotment slopes down from Newmarket Road to Enoggera Creek. The land subsequently passed through the hands of several owners until the boom in residential development in the area during the 1920s and 1930s following the extension of the electric tramline to Windsor in 1914 and the Grange in 1928. The area became known as the Langley Bank Estate and the portion of the Estate between Vardon and Granville Streets was re-subdivided and additional streets added, including Clifton Street, before being offered for sale again as the "model Darrima Estate" in 1928.

In April 1928, re-subdivisions 47 and 48 were purchased by Richard Jack, a young wool classer of Brisbane. By this time about 20 homes had been built in Clifton Street. The Brisbane City Council Building Application Register for 26 April 1928 records Jack's application for construction of the house at a cost of £799. The entry records that the architect was N. McCredie and the builder HW Dillecate of Milton. The house was constructed promptly and Richard Jack and his family were living in the house by October 1928. The house is named on the 1934 detail plan for the Brisbane City Council Water Supply and Sewerage Department as Uanda. The name is thought to have an association with a property near Hughenden which had some special attachment for the Jacks. The Jacks remained in the house until 1960 when the property was sold. It was sold again in 1966 when it was converted to a duplex. The property has since changed hands several times.

When constructed the house was rectangular in plan with a central projecting open front porch containing the entry steps and door to the south. The porch was flanked by bay windows and the house contained an entry hall, two bedrooms, kitchen, dining nook, living room, bathroom, sleepout verandah to the south east and laundry under. The kitchen had built-in cupboards; the bathroom had a laundry chute connecting to a cupboard in the laundry beneath the house; the lounge opened onto the entry hall through 4 large glass paneled doors; the lounge and main bedroom were wallpapered; other walls throughout the house were lined with vertical tongue and groove boards; and the living room had a plate rail. The house was originally painted cream with dark green to the bay windows.

Uanda is currently the only identified work of architect and potter Nellie McCredie. The career of Nellie McCredie is typical of the careers of women who entered the architectural profession prior to World War Two. These early women architects were rarely able to sustain their careers and as a result, examples of their work are extremely rare. Only three Brisbane buildings, including Uanda, have been identified. The other two were designed by Elina Mottram who practiced in Brisbane from 1924 to 1926.

Nellie McCredie was a member of a leading architectural family with associations with Queensland as well as New South Wales. She was the niece of well-known Sydney architects Arthur Latimer and George McCredie who from 1889 to 1893 opened a Brisbane office, as McCredie Brothers and Chambers. Nellie McCredie's cousin, Leith C. McCredie, was also an architect and worked in the 1920s in the Sydney firm of Robertson and Marks.

Nellie McCredie graduated with a Bachelor of Architecture from the University of Sydney in 1923, one of Australia's earliest architectural graduates. After graduating, she worked briefly for Dorman, Long and Company, contractors for the Sydney Harbour Bridge. Later she worked with several unidentified architects in Cairns for about 10 months, then came south to Brisbane where she was employed from November 1925 to early 1929 as a Draftswoman in the Workers' Dwellings Branch of the State Advances Corporation. It has not been possible to identify any of the work produced by the Workers' Dwellings Branch as work by McCredie as government drawings of the period were rarely signed by their designers. It was during this time that she designed Uanda as a private commission.

Nellie McCredie was concerned with improving the quality of life of the average Australian. In her Bachelor of Architecture thesis she advocates simple, chaste buildings in "appropriate" settings generously planted with trees, illustrating her ideas with "a pretty suburban cottage" not unlike Uanda in its symmetry, central entrance porch and simple hipped roof. In her preference for simple, classic buildings McCredie reflects the ideals of her university teachers, including Professor Leslie Wilkinson.

Like many of her women contemporaries, her practice of architecture was not to be sustained. Having studied pottery in Brisbane under the master craftsman, LJ Harvey, McCredie returned to Sydney in 1932 where she became a professional potter, setting up a commercial pottery at Epping in partnership with her younger brother Robert Reginald (Bob) McCredie. She exhibited actively with the New South Wales Society of Arts and Crafts into the 1950s and in 1951 won the Society's Elizabeth Soderberg Memorial Award for pottery. Pottery by the McCredies is well regarded for its simplicity and craftsmanship. It is represented in five public collections in Australia: National Gallery of Australia, Art Gallery of New South Wales, Powerhouse Museum (Sydney), Art Gallery of South Australia and Shepparton Art Gallery.

At some point the verandah was enclosed and in 1966, the house was converted into a duplex. When the house was sold in 1998, the owner intended to demolish it (there being no heritage listing at that time) to construct two residences for their family. However, when the Brisbane City Council Heritage Unit initiated research on the house, they discovered it was the work of one of Brisbane's few female architects in the period between the First World War and the Second World War and proposed that the property be heritage-listed, resulting in a court case to determine if the property could be demolished. The relatively short architectural career of Nellie McCredie was put forward as an argument that she was neither a serious nor significant architect and therefore the property's association with her was not grounds for a heritage listing. The resultant court case acknowledged that the property had been bought in good faith with the intention of demolition based on professional advice that there was no barrier to doing so, but ultimately decided that the property should be heritage-listed for its association with Nellie McCredie and not demolished.

== Description ==
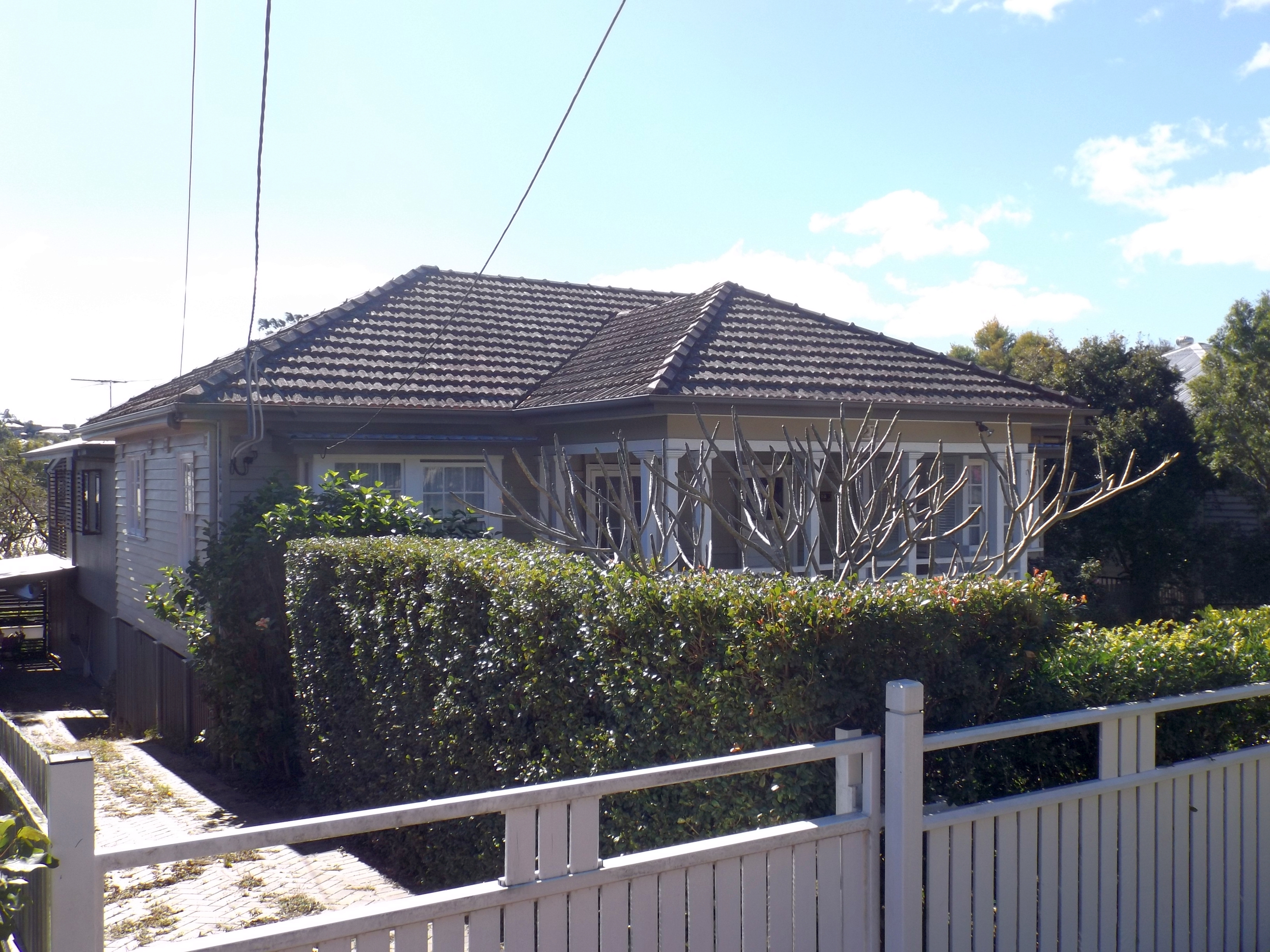
Street view, 2015

Constructed in 1928 across two blocks of land, Uanda is a low-set, hip-roofed, single-storey timber cottage set in a leafy street among timber houses of the same era. Rectangular in plan with a central projecting front porch flanked by bay windows, the house is clad with weatherboards and has a simple valance of timber palings to the lower level. The bay windows have bell-curved, shingle-clad skirts and multi-paned sash windows below flat projecting roofs and are supported on exposed timbers with a bird-mouth detail to the ends. The roof is tiled and has short projecting eaves with v-j boarded soffit. The house is elevated on concrete stumps, approximately one metre above the ground at the front and higher at the back as the ground slopes away.

The porch is now enclosed with weatherboards, glass louvres and casement windows and contains two entrance doors, each with a concrete stair with steel balustrade. Internally, there is evidence of the original pair of timber framed doors in the southern wall. On the exterior, there is evidence of twin corner verandah posts with decorative cappings. The porch is generously proportioned and has had an internal dividing wall recently removed. The floors are covered with linoleum and the ceiling is timber v-j boarding.

The original planning of the house is clearly discernible; public rooms with decorative details are located towards the front of the house and service rooms are at the back, although there are now two kitchens and two bathrooms dating from when the house was converted to a duplex. The principal rooms at the front of the house are lined in a compressed timber-fibre sheet material (known commercially as "beaver board") with decorative joinery, in particular, ornate cornices and architraves and a plate rail in the former living room, now divided into two smaller rooms. The ceilings have a grid-like pattern of timber strips and floors are timber boarding. Several of the interior doors are timber with four horizontal panels and some original hardware and there is also a multi-paned, timber and glass door between the front bedroom and hall.

The original kitchen is located in the north-west corner of the house, is lined vertical timber v-j boarding and contains some of the original joinery, including a set of tall cupboards. There is a set of three casement windows over the sink and a small timber sash window next to the back door. A toilet is located on the landing outside the backdoor of the kitchen next to a set of timber steps. The second kitchen is located in the north-east corner in the former sleep-out. This room has a door and stairs to the back garden. On the exterior of this room there are several timber decorative details including timber capitals and panels of early, painted timber slatted blinds. The two bathrooms are located between the kitchens. Both have terrazzo floors, baths and small cabinets. The top of the laundry chute remains in one of the bathrooms, however, the chute itself and cupboard in the laundry on the ground floor have been removed.

Two laundry hoists are located on a concrete slab in the back garden. A timber framed and fibro garage is located on the western side of the site.

== Heritage listing ==
Uanda was listed on the Queensland Heritage Register on 24 March 2000 having satisfied the following criteria.

The place is important in demonstrating the evolution or pattern of Queensland's history.

Uanda, a low set, single storey timber house built in 1928, is historically important for its association with the entry of women into the professions in Queensland, particularly into the architectural profession.

The place demonstrates rare, uncommon or endangered aspects of Queensland's cultural heritage.

As one of a small number of surviving intact examples of the work of pioneer women architects in Queensland and the only remaining architectural work of Nellie McCredie, Uanda demonstrates rare aspects of Queensland's cultural heritage.

The place is important because of its aesthetic significance.

Uanda has aesthetic significance derived from its careful, symmetrical composition, interior detailing and its contribution to the streetscape – in form and massing sympathetic to its neighbours and contributing a modest presence to a leafy suburban street.

The place has a special association with the life or work of a particular person, group or organisation of importance in Queensland's history.

Uanda has a strong and special association with the work of Nellie McCredie, an important pioneer woman architect, potter and member of a leading architectural family with associations with Brisbane.
