= Burwood Cemetery =

Cemetery in Victoria, Australia

- Interactive map of Burwood Cemetery

Details
- Established: 1857
- Location: Burwood, Victoria
- Country: Australia
- Coordinates: 37.85202°S 145.10004°E
- Website: Burwood Cemetery
- Find a Grave: Burwood Cemetery
- Footnotes: Burwood Cemetery – Billion Graves

Burwood Cemetery is a cemetery in Burwood, Victoria in Australia. It dates back to 1858, and was originally known as Nunawading General Cemetery. It is known as a resting place of notable figures from Melbourne. The site is operated by Greater Metropolitan Cemeteries Trust, who also manage eighteen other cemeteries and memorial parks around Victoria, including Preston Cemetery, Fawkner Memorial Park, Altona Memorial Park and Coburg Pine Ridge Cemetery.

== Notable interments ==
- Frank Cumbrae-Stewart, barrister and university professor
- Zina Cumbrae-Stewart, philanthropist
- John S. Clark, Scottish-born Australian entomologist and myrmecologist
- Harold Elliott, soldier and politician
- Sir Charles Powers, High Court judge
- Percival Serle, historian, biographer, bibliographer
- F. W. Thring, film-maker and entrepreneur
- E. W. Tipping, journalist
- Mervyn Allanson Henry Kelaart, Ceylon (Sri Lanka) cricketer, first class

== War graves ==
The cemetery contains the war graves of fifty-four Commonwealth service personnel. There are eight from World War I and forty-six from World War II.
