= Nellie McCredie =

Australian architect

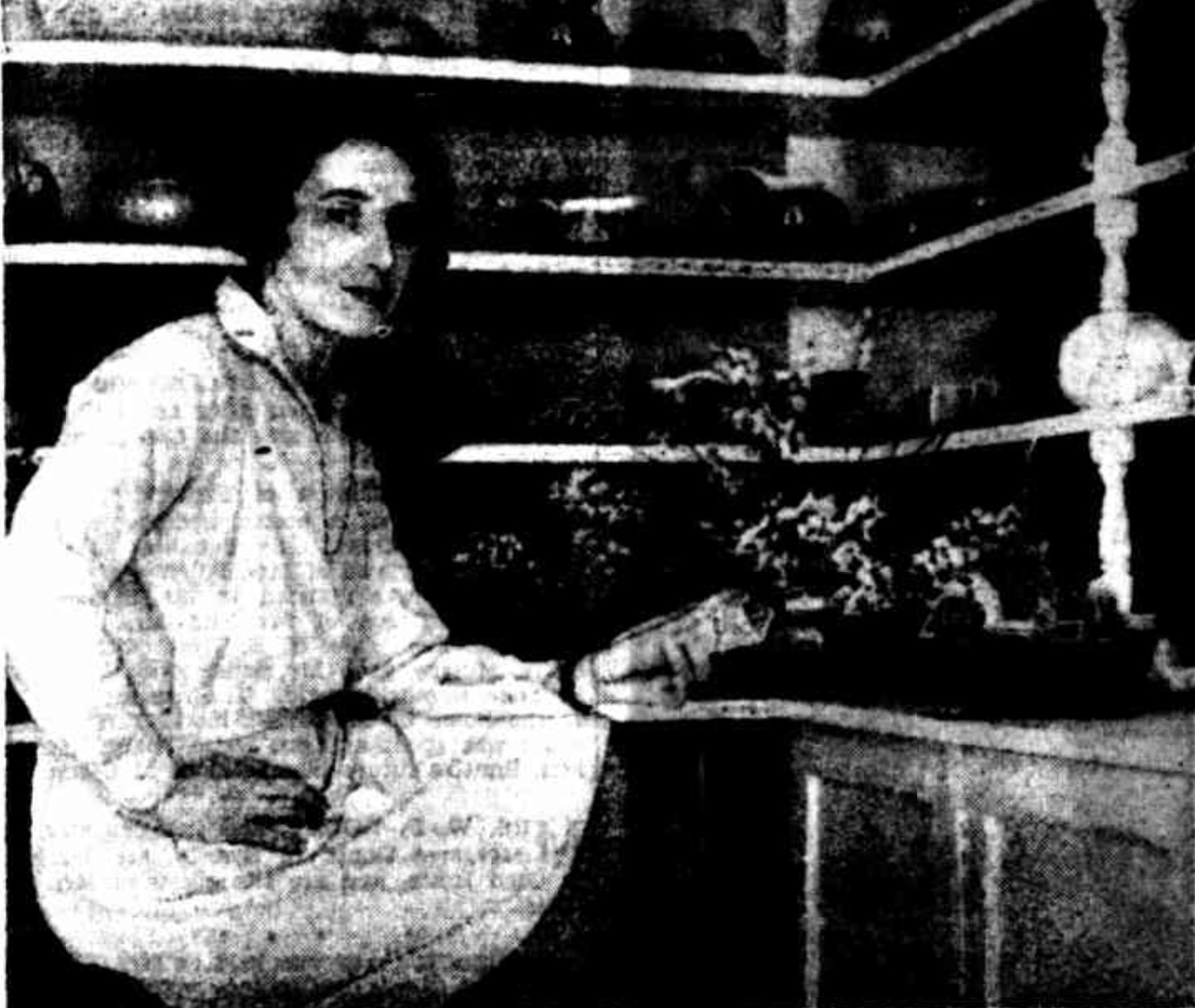
Miss Nell McCredie in a corner of her studio, samples of her artistic work line the shelves, 1936.jpg

Nellie (Nell) McCredie (1901—1968) was an Australian architect and potter. One of her works Uanda is listed on the Queensland Heritage Register. Her artworks are held in a number of major Australian galleries.

== Biography ==
Nellie McCredie was born in Sydney on 27 May 1901, the daughter of Robert Smail McCredie and his wife Nellie. Her siblings were Robert, Allan, Ina, and George.

McCredie was a member of a leading architectural family with associations with Queensland as well as New South Wales. She was the niece of well-known Sydney architects Arthur Latimer and George McCredie who from 1889 to 1893 opened a Brisbane office, as McCredie Brothers and Chambers. When George McCredie died suddenly in 1903, Arthur McCredie continued the practice with his son Leith. The firm merged with Arthur Anderson and became McCredie and Anderson in 1903.

Nell McCredie graduated with a Bachelor of Architecture from the University of Sydney in 1923, one of Australia's earliest architectural graduates. After graduating, she worked briefly for Dorman, Long and Company, contractors for the Sydney Harbour Bridge. In July 1925, she worked for Lawrence and Lourdain Architects in Cairns for four months, then came south to Brisbane where she was employed from November 1925 to early 1929 as a Draftswoman in the Workers' Dwellings Branch (WDB) of the State Advances Corporation. Due to the discovery of Nell's archive in 2013, it is now possible to identify the houses she designed while working for the WDB. She designed six known houses while working in this department, located in Brisbane inner city suburbs, Montville, and Cairns. It was during this time that she designed Uanda as a private commission.

Nell McCredie was concerned with improving the quality of life of the average Australian. In her Bachelor of Architecture thesis, she advocates simple, chaste buildings in "appropriate" settings generously planted with trees, illustrating her ideas with "a pretty suburban cottage" not unlike Uanda in its symmetry, central entrance porch and simple hipped roof. In her preference for simple, classic buildings McCredie reflects the ideals of her university teachers, including Professor Leslie Wilkinson.

Like many of her women contemporaries, her practice of architecture was not to be sustained. Having studied pottery in Brisbane under the master craftsman Lewis Jarvis Harvey, McCredie returned to Sydney in 1932 where she became a professional potter, setting up a commercial pottery at Epping in partnership with her younger brother Robert Reginald (Bob) McCredie. She exhibited actively with the New South Wales Society of Arts and Crafts into the 1950s and in 1951 won the Society's Elizabeth Soderberg Memorial Award for pottery. Pottery by the McCredies is well regarded for its simplicity and craftsmanship. It is represented in five public collections in Australia: National Gallery of Australia, Art Gallery of New South Wales, Powerhouse Museum (Sydney), Art Gallery of South Australia and Shepparton Art Gallery.

Uanda is currently the only identified work of architect and potter McCredie. Her career is typical of the careers of women who entered the architectural profession prior to World War II. These early women architects were rarely able to sustain their careers and as a result, examples of their work are extremely rare. Only three Brisbane buildings, including Uanda, have been identified. The other two were designed by Elina Mottram who practised in Brisbane from 1924 to 1926. McCredie died in Sydney in 1968.
