= Scott Street Flats =

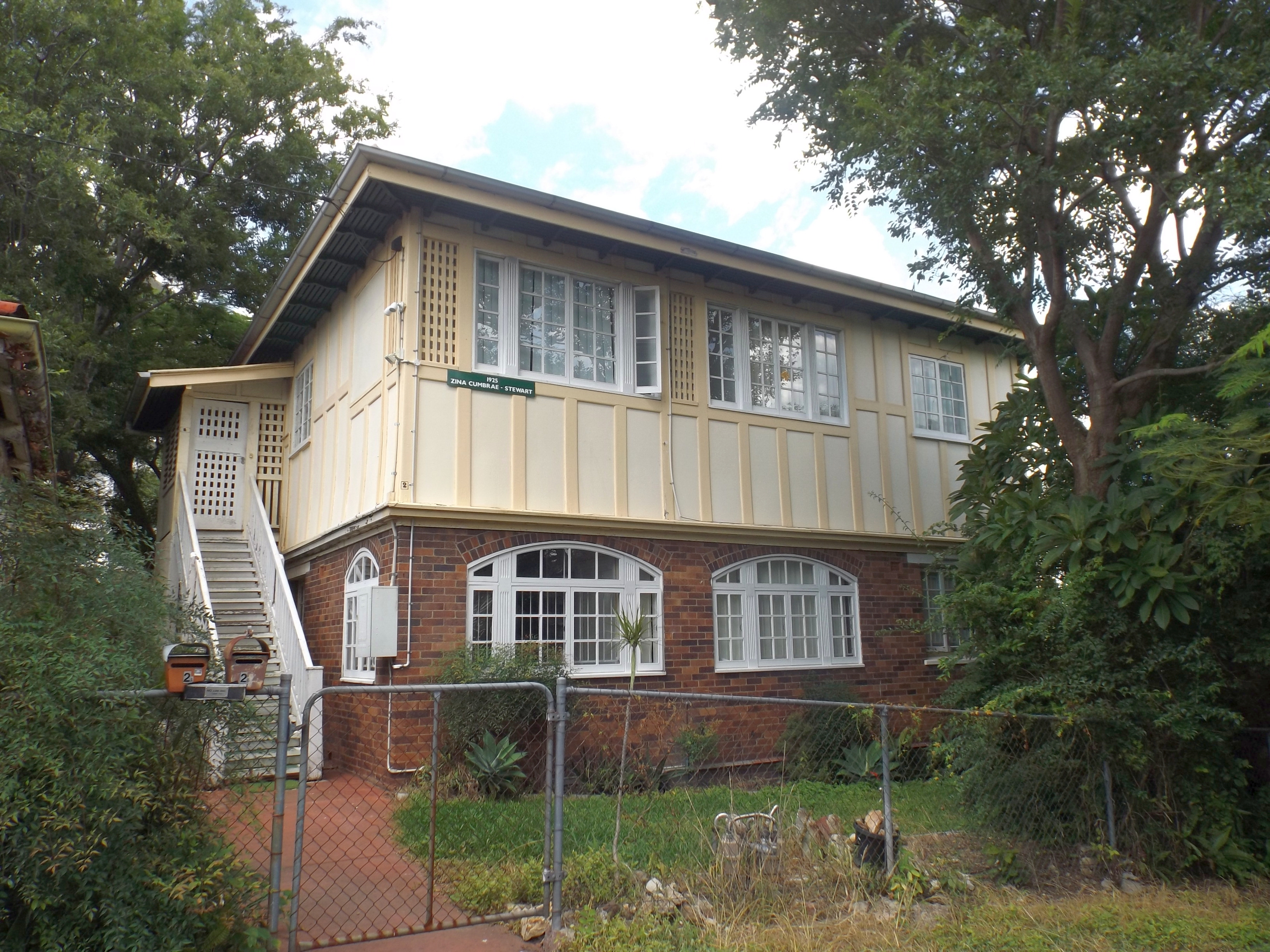
- Front entrance, 2015

- Location within Queensland Location within Australia
- 27.4708°S 153.035°E
- Location: 2 Scott Street, Kangaroo Point, City of Brisbane, Queensland, Australia

History
- Design period: 1919–1930s (interwar period)
- Built: c. 1925

Site notes
- Architect: Elina Mottram
- Architectural style: Tudor

Queensland Heritage Register
- Official name: Scott Street Flats, Scott House
- Type: state heritage (built)
- Designated: 29 April 2003
- Reference no.: 601171
- Significant period: 1920s (fabric); 1920s–1930s (historical)
- Significant components: laundry / wash house, residential accommodation – flat/s, furniture/fittings
- Builders: W B Johnstone

Scott Street Flats is a heritage-listed apartment block at 2 Scott Street, Kangaroo Point, City of Brisbane, Queensland, Australia. It was designed by Elina Mottram and built to c. 1925 by W. B. Johnstone. It is also known as Scott House. It was added to the Queensland Heritage Register on 29 April 2003.

== History ==
The Scott Street Flats, a two storey building of masonry and timber built in c. 1925 for Frank and Zina Cumbrae-Stewart, and was designed by Elina Mottram, a pioneer woman architect in Queensland. The building is located in Kangaroo Point, close to the Brisbane River and overlooking the Town Reach to the central business district of Brisbane city. The block is an amalgamation of two allotments that were once part of the Wesleyan Church Reserve of 1850. Zina Cumbrae-Stewart purchased the land in 1913. Upon her death in 1956, the property passed to her son Francis. In 2013 the property was sold to GDW Investments for $3.3 million with the intention to develop a high rise apartment on the site.

The Cumbrae-Stewarts moved from Taringa to Kangaroo Point sometime around 1914–15. In 1917–18, the Cumbrae-Stewarts moved to 283 Main Street, a large house located on the corner of Main and Scott Streets, adjacent to the site of the Scott Street Flats, which were constructed sometime in 1925. The flats were occupied from about 1926, the first listing to appear was a Lesley Backhouse. The Cumbrae-Stewarts resided at 283 Main Street until 1930. They then moved to the flats, which became known as "Scott House". In 1936 Professor Cumbrae-Stewart retired and the couple re-located to Melbourne where his wife was born and both had been educated.

Queensland Government legislation of 1920 that increased the rating powers of local government and resulted in a doubling of general rates may have provided the impetus for the Cumbrae-Stewarts to develop their block. Many of the large 1880s houses of the inner city suburbs were being converted into flats to address the housing shortages in Brisbane in the 1920s. The Queensland Magazine of May 1925 reported that in Kangaroo Point there were "many beautiful homes still occupied by tenants who have no desire to cut up their gardens to make room for small villas" but that "some very modern flats have sprung up". It was an enterprising move on the part of Mrs. Cumbrae-Stewart to build the flats with the dual purpose of investment and providing a convenient home for her husband and herself in their latter years.

The 1920s saw an increasing number of purpose-built flats erected in inner Brisbane. Tender notices in the Architectural and Building Journal of Queensland indicate that the number of new flats being constructed grew steadily in the early to mid 1920s, reaching record levels in 1929. The economic depression of the early 1930s brought a halt to flat-building activities, which began to recover again in the mid 1930s. 1933–36 was the boom time for flat construction in Brisbane. The Scott Street Flats are an early example of purpose-designed flats and reflect the interwar preference for Old English or Tudor Revival and Spanish/Mediterranean design themes.

Purpose-designed flats introduced a range of new domestic features, some of which are evident in the Scott Street flats. The amount of built-in storage is a significant feature – the kitchen, bathroom and bedrooms are all equipped with sensibly detailed, space efficient units. A maid's bedroom was a feature of many of the more prestigious flats. The Scott Street flats are carefully planned to enable back-of-house movement between bathroom, kitchen, laundry and maid's room on the southern side of the building whilst maintaining formal living spaces and bedrooms orientated to the North and to city and river views. The two-way drawers and narrow door from maid's room to entry hall are features that allowed the residents to maintain their genteel lifestyles in the new domestic environment of a flat.

=== The Cumbrae-Stewarts ===
Both Cumbrae-Stewart and his wife were prominent and active citizens of Brisbane early in the century. Frank was a barrister and King's Counsel and was appointed the foundation registrar and librarian of the new University of Queensland in 1910. Among his numerous involvements, he was a founder and president of the Royal Historical Society of Queensland and a founder and trustee of the John Oxley Library. Historical papers he authored included histories of the Brisbane River, Brisbane bridges and surveyors of the Queensland coast. In 1926 he became Garrick Professor of Law at the University of Queensland.

Zina was equally active. A deeply committed evangelical Anglican, she was an executive member of the Australian Red Cross in Queensland for twenty-two years, was an original member of the Mother's Union and its president for nine years and president of the National Council of Women of Queensland for nine years. She helped found the Queensland Social Service League in 1931 to cope with problems related to the Depression. Other societies she was involved with included the Mothercraft Association, the Traveller's Aid Society and the Shakespeare Society. Zina Cumbrae-Stewart was the first woman to speak from the platform of the Brisbane City Hall and had early involvement in educational broadcasting.

=== Elina Mottram ===
Women who were first to enter the architectural profession were restricted in their ability to attract clients, especially in the corporate sector – "women did not have access to the mysterious but often profitable workings of the 'old boy network'". Women did, however, begin to develop their own associations – "there is also a likelihood that as women architects became more senior they formed connections with other influential women, particularly those involved in welfare and church work, through their membership of the various Melbourne Women's Clubs." It is likely connections such as these that brought Zina Cumbrae-Stewart and Elina Mottram together as client and architect in the mid 1920s. Certainly, Mrs. Cumbrae-Stewart was a member of the Lyceum Club in Brisbane and it appears that she took responsibility for most of the family's financial dealings.

Elina Mottram was born in 1903. The only child of building contractor Arthur Mottram, she had early encouragement to become an architect. In 1924, she was the first woman in Brisbane to open her own architectural practice. The Architects and Builders Journal of Queensland reported:

"Brisbane has at last a lady architect, in the person of Miss Elina Mottram, of Nundah, who has commenced the practice of her professional in the T and G Building. We offer congratulations on her recent successes at the Technical College and trust that she will get her fair share of support."

She was fortunate to establish her practice during the pre-Depression building boom in Brisbane. Domestic commissions formed the basis of her early work but she went on to have a long and varied career in architecture. In fact, of the small group of nine pioneering women architects in Queensland (that is, those practising before World War II), Mottram was the only one to pursue her architectural career for the full length of her working life.

She taught Building Construction at the Brisbane Central Technical College and from 1926 was a sole practitioner in the central western Queensland town of Longreach. In Longreach she designed a number of houses and public buildings including the Masonic Temple and Longreach Motors, and re-modelled the AWU Hall and the School of Arts. In 1937 she was in partnership with her father in Rockhampton as "A. and E. Mottram. Contractor and Architect". One of their major jobs was the Longreach Hospital and in 1940, she was "foreman" of works on the first stage of construction of this building which was designed by Hall and Phillips. During the Second World War she worked as a draftswoman in the American Army Engineering Office in Rockhampton. Later as a Queensland Railways architect she designed the new Eagle Junction railway station. A residence in Corinda and the Scott Street Flats are the only known remaining intact examples of her work in Brisbane.

== Description ==
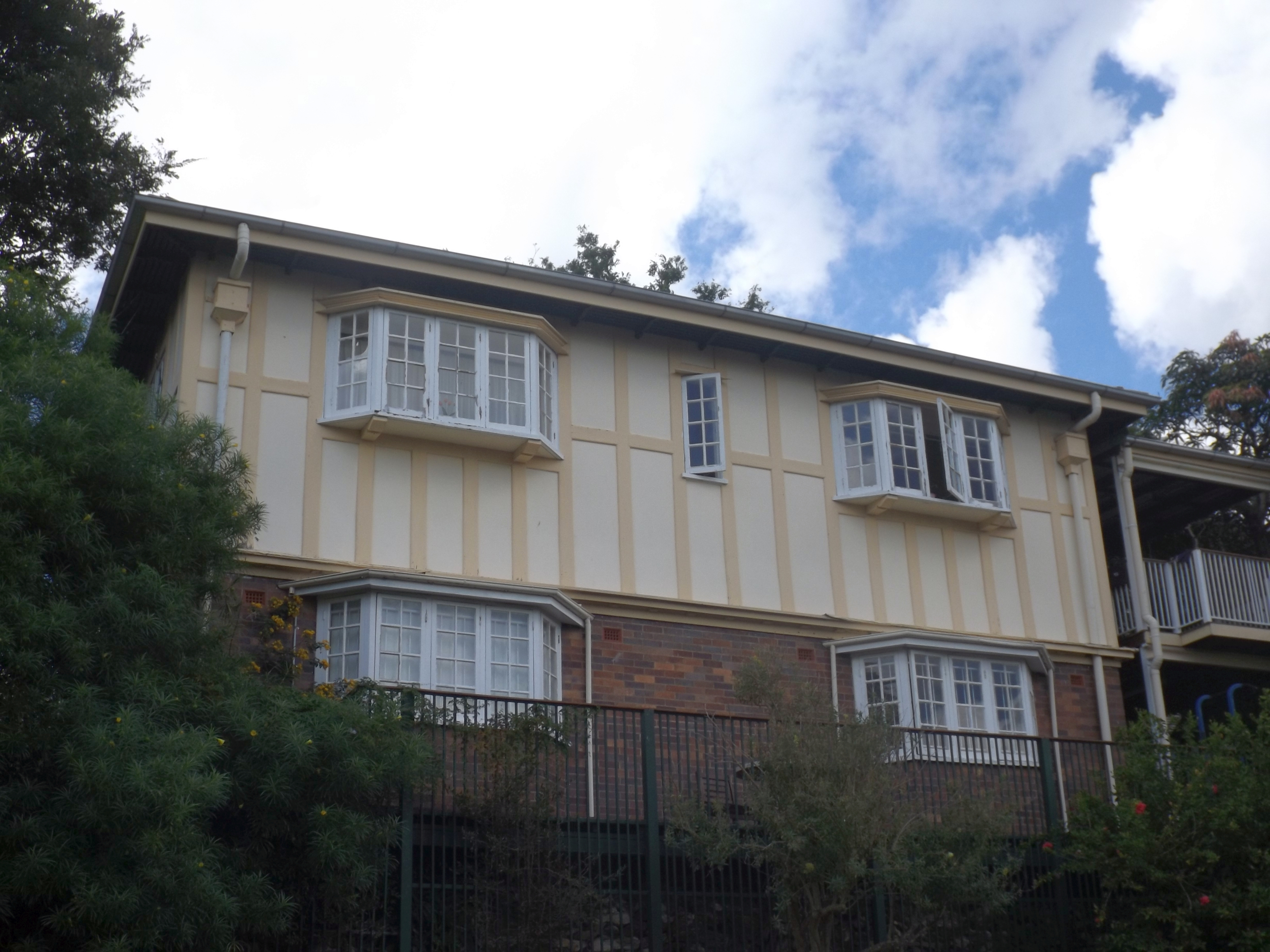
View from riverside park, 2015

Scott Street Flats is a two storey, timber and masonry Tudor Revival building located overlooking the Brisbane River at Kangaroo Point. The building contains two flats, each occupying a full floor with identical floorplans. Almost square in plan, the building has a pyramid shaped, terracotta tiled roof with overhanging eaves. It is constructed of red face brick at ground level and has a half timbered appearance at upper level, achieved through the use of fibro-cement cladding with timber cover strips. The plain exterior of the building is simply elaborated with arched brick openings at ground floor level, small panels of timber lattice and a timber corbel between the two floors. The western elevation facing the river has four faceted bay windows and downpipes with prominent rainwater heads at each end.

Entry to the flats is on the eastern side of the building. Timber stairs lead to an upper level entry porch enclosed in timber lattice. A similar enclosure is located under the stairs, providing access to the ground floor flat.

The front door opens into an antechamber which narrows to become a hallway. To the left of the front door is a small door opening from the former maid's room. The hallway terminates in a vestibule, shaped as a square on 45 degrees, with doors on each of the four sides leading into various rooms. To the left is the kitchen and dining room, to the right, the sitting room and second bedroom. The main bedroom and bathroom are located off the hallway. An enclosed porch is found on the northern side of the bedrooms, connected by half glass, French doors. A service area and back stairs are located on the southern side of the kitchen and bathroom and provides access between the former maid's room, bathroom and kitchen.

There are timber floors and linoleum throughout and interior walls and ceilings are lined with fibro-cement with timber mouldings. The sitting room and dining room have a narrow plate rail and the ceilings are decorated with a simple grid of flat timber cover moulding. Some early light fittings and linoleum remain. There are generous amounts of built-in storage in all rooms. An entire wall of the kitchen contains a variety of cupboards, drawers and pantry spaces. One set of drawers operates in both directions between the kitchen and adjacent dining room. These drawers sit within a carefully designed storage unit of timber and glass that faces into the dining room.

Windows throughout are generally multi-paned casement windows and doors are timber with three panels and high mid rails, with original hardware throughout. Multi-paned, glass French doors are located between the dining room and sitting room and between the sitting room and porch. The bathroom and kitchen have timber ventilation panels, original features such as a cast iron, claw foot bath and porcelain enamel sinks and a painted concrete floor. A laundry is located in the southern garden at the back of the building and contains concrete sinks and galvanised iron water storage.

== Heritage listing ==
Scott Street Flats was listed on the Queensland Heritage Register on 29 April 2003 having satisfied the following criteria.

The place is important in demonstrating the evolution or pattern of Queensland's history.

Scott Street Flats, a two storey building of masonry and timber built in c. 1925, is historically important for its association with the entry of women into the professions in Queensland, particularly into the architectural profession.

Scott Street Flats is important in demonstrating the interwar residential development of Brisbane when flats appeared in inner-city suburbs, increasing the density and diversity of the city's housing stock.

The place demonstrates rare, uncommon or endangered aspects of Queensland's cultural heritage.

Scott Street Flats demonstrate rare aspects of Queensland's cultural heritage as there are few surviving intact examples of the work of pioneer woman architects in Queensland.

The place is important because of its aesthetic significance.

The building has aesthetic significance as a well designed example of an early purpose-built flats building in the Tudor Revival style.

The place has a special association with the life or work of a particular person, group or organisation of importance in Queensland's history.

The Scott Street Flats have a special association with the work of Elina Mottram, the first woman to open her own architectural practice in Brisbane and Queensland's longest practising woman architect.

The Scott Street Flats also have an association with Professor and Mrs. Cumbrae-Stewart, prominent citizens of Brisbane in the 1910s, 20s and 30s.
