= Nundah State School =

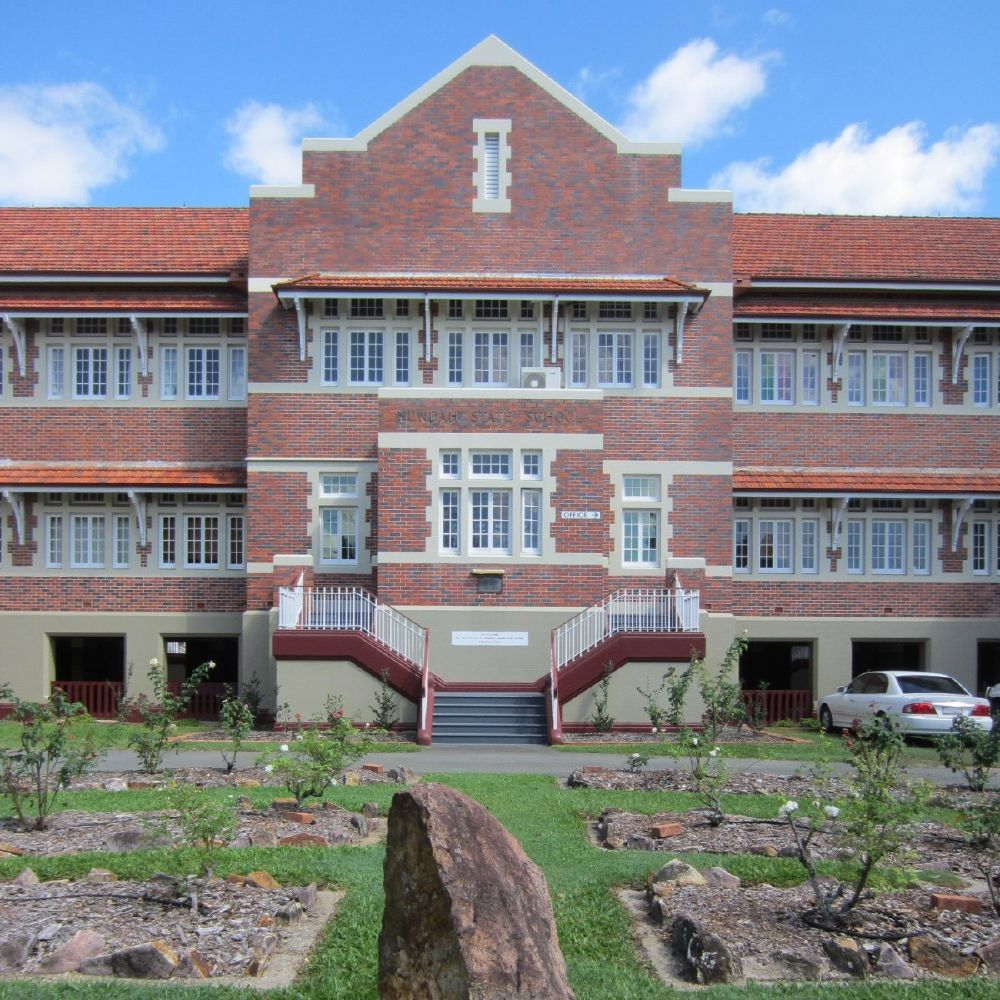
- Bage Street entrance to Nundah State School, 2016

- Location within Queensland
- 27.4023°S 153.0569°E
- Location: 41 Bage Street, Nundah, City of Brisbane, Queensland, Australia

History
- Design period: 1919–1930s (Interwar period)
- Built: 1892–1955

Site notes
- Architectural style: Classicism

Queensland Heritage Register
- Official name: Nundah State School
- Type: state heritage
- Designated: 15 July 2016
- Reference no.: 650033
- Type: Education, research, scientific facility: school-state
- Theme: Maintaining order: Defending the country; Educating Queenslanders: Providing primary schooling

Nundah State School is a heritage-listed state school at 41 Bage Street, Nundah, City of Brisbane, Queensland, Australia. It was built from 1892 to 1955. It was formerly known as German State National School and German Station State School. It was added to the Queensland Heritage Register on 15 July 2016.

== History ==
Nundah State School (established 1865 as German Station National School) is located in the suburb of Nundah, about eight kilometres northeast of Brisbane's CBD. It is important in demonstrating the evolution of state education and its associated architecture. It retains a Depression-era brick school building (1935, 1941, 1946–51); a suburban timber school building (1915) with extensions (1916, 1955, 1956), and an Honour Board (1916); set in landscaped grounds with concrete retaining walls (c. 1935, 1940), a playing field, sporting facilities and mature trees. The school has a strong and ongoing association with the Nundah and district community.

Nundah is the site of the first free European settlement in Queensland. Lutheran missionaries settled there in 1838 on 640 acres (260 ha) of land granted by Major Cotton, the then commandant of the Moreton Bay Penal Settlement. They named their settlement Zion Hill. The group numbered 20, including 2 ministers, 10 laymen and their families, until 4 more laymen missionaries arrived in 1844. By 1849, the group had abandoned their missionary work but most remained farming in the area. They purchased land at Nundah, then called German Station, which was surveyed into blocks by the Queensland Government in 1848, and a small rural community developed.

In the early 1860s, local citizens raised £94 towards the £390 cost for the establishment of German Station National School. The school opened on 2 October 1865 on its current 3.24 hectares (8.0 acres) site with 62 children enrolled. The school building was located at the southeast corner of the site facing Buckland Road. A teachers residence was onsite from the 1860s, located to the north of the school building.

The provision of state-administered education was important to the colonial governments of Australia. National schools, established in 1848 in New South Wales, were continued in Queensland following the colony's creation in 1859. Following the introduction of the Education Act 1860, which established the Board of General Education and began standardising curriculum, training and facilities, Queensland's national and public schools grew from four in 1860 to 230 by 1875. The State Education Act 1875 provided for free, compulsory and secular primary education and established the Department of Public Instruction. This further standardised the provision of education, and despite difficulties, achieved the remarkable feat of bringing basic literacy to most Queensland children by 1900.

The establishment of schools was considered an essential step in the development of early communities and integral to their success. Locals often donated land and labour for a school's construction and the school community contributed to maintenance and development. Schools became a community focus, a symbol of progress, and a source of pride, with enduring connections formed with past pupils, parents, and teachers. The inclusion of war memorials and community halls reinforced these connections and provided a venue for a wide range of community events in schools across Queensland.

To help ensure consistency and economy, the Queensland Government developed standard plans for its school buildings. From the 1860s until the 1960s, Queensland school buildings were predominantly timber-framed, an easy and cost-effective approach that also enabled the government to provide facilities in remote areas. Standard designs were continually refined in response to changing needs and educational philosophy and Queensland school buildings were particularly innovative in climate control, lighting, and ventilation. Standardisation produced distinctly similar schools across Queensland with complexes of typical components.

Architectural plans for extensions to the school and teachers residences located at German Station, circa 1880

The development of Nundah, and increased school enrolments, were stimulated by the opening of the Sandgate railway line in 1882, with a stop at German Station (soon renamed Nundah railway station). Subdivision of land near the station from 1882 led to the formation of the Nundah village. Enrolment at German Station State School rose rapidly from 61 pupils in 1883 to 118 by 1886, resulting in extension of the school building in the same year. When a playshed was built in 1889, the school's enrolment was 200 pupils. Another addition in 1892, connected to the northwest of the school building by a verandah, brought the classroom total to three. The school's name changed to Nundah State School in 1896. A new teacher's residence was built in 1897.

An important component of Queensland state schools was their grounds. The early and continuing commitment to play-based education, particularly in primary school, resulted in the provision of outdoor play space and sporting facilities, such as ovals and tennis courts. Also, trees and gardens were planted to shade and beautify schools. In the 1870s, schools inspector William Boyd was critical of tropical schools and amongst his recommendations stressed the importance of the adding shade trees to playgrounds. Subsequently, Arbor Day celebrations began in Queensland in 1890. Aesthetically designed gardens were encouraged by regional inspectors, and educators believed gardening and Arbor Days instilled in young minds the value of hard work and activity, improved classroom discipline, developed aesthetic tastes, and inspired people to stay on the land. Arbor Day was regularly observed at Nundah State School from at least 1892, when 20 plants and shrubs were planted. In 2016 a number of mature trees feature in the school's grounds.

From the late 19th century, Nundah became the centre for the surrounding district. It served as the headquarters for the Toombul Divisional Board after its new offices and a hall (Toombul Shire Hall) were built on Sandgate Road at Nundah in 1891. Similarly, Nundah State School's population expanded and in 1909 another classroom was added to the western end of the school buildings. By 1910 the school had an average attendance of 342 pupils while the Nundah and district's population was 1675 in 1911.

Early in the 20th century, accommodation for the infants of the school became a priority. In 1912 a new room was erected for the infants, to the west of the early school buildings; it was highset and had north and south-facing verandahs. An infants wing (a suburban timber school building, known as Block D in 2016) of "substantial finish and ornate appearance", was erected to the west of the infants classroom in 1915 at a cost of £735. The 65-by-21-foot (19.8 m × 6.4 m) building contained three classrooms and had a 10-foot (3.0 m) wide north-facing verandah. The school's enrolment was 700 when the building was opened on 17 February 1916. That year, a 16-by-12-foot (4.9 m × 3.7 m) teachers room was added to the verandah. A drawing of the building from 1933 shows it had a large roof fleche.

This suburban timber school building, designed by the Department of Public Works (DPW) in 1914, was the culmination of years of experimentation to solve many of the problems of light, ventilation, and classroom size that plagued previous school designs as well as provided the ideal, modern education environment. From 1893 the DPW had greatly improved the natural ventilation and lighting of classroom interiors, experimenting with different combinations of roof ventilators, ceiling and wall vents, larger windows, dormer windows and ducting. Achieving an ideal or even adequate level of natural light in classrooms, without glare, was of critical importance to educators and consequently it became central to the design and layout of all school buildings. In c. 1909 highset timber buildings had been introduced, providing better ventilation as well as further teaching space and a covered play area underneath. This was a noticeable new direction and this form became a characteristic of Queensland schools. A technical innovation developed at this time was a continuous ventilation flap on the wall at floor level. This hinged board could be opened to increase air flow into the space and, combined with a ceiling vent and large roof fleche, improved internal air quality and decreased internal temperatures effectively.

During World War I (WWI) Nundah State School commemorated those serving in the war in several ways. An Anzac Arbor Day took place in May 1916, when five hibiscuses (Hibiscus spp.) and one Indian laburnum (Cassia fistula) were planted, the latter being given the name "Anzac tree". On 14 December of that year the Nundah State School Honour Board was unveiled by the Governor of Queensland, Major Sir Hamilton John Goold-Adams, in honour of 59 former pupils who were serving at the front. War memorials, including honour boards, are a tribute to those who served, and those who died, from a particular community. They are an important element of Queensland's towns and cities and are also important in demonstrating a common pattern of commemoration across Queensland and Australia.

After WWI, Nundah and district, and Nundah State School, continued to grow. In 1921 Nundah's population was 3870. To accommodate the school's increased population the head teachers residence was converted into classrooms in 1919. In 1924 more than 800 children attended the school. The school committee worked to improve the playing conditions for the children with swings, seesaws, swinging boats and other playground equipment being provided, as well as a tennis court to the north of the site opened in October of that year. Another building, of four sectional classrooms (which became Block E), was added in 1927. Money was raised to pay for levelling the grounds, and Arbor Day continued to be celebrated with new plantings. Alterations to the suburban timber school building were made in 1933, including: the relocation of large banks of casement windows from the east and west ends to the southern wall, and lining of the openings; relocation of a verandah wall door; and replacement of the fixed partition between the central and eastern classrooms with a new folding partition.

The Great Depression, commencing in 1929 and extending well into the 1930s, caused a dramatic reduction of building work in Queensland and brought private building work to a standstill. In response, the Queensland Government provided relief work for unemployed Queenslanders, and also embarked on an ambitious and important building programme to provide impetus to the economy.

Even before the October 1929 stock market crash, the Queensland Government initiated an Unemployment Relief Scheme, through a work programme by the Department of Public Works. This included painting and repairs to school buildings. By mid-1930 men were undertaking grounds improvement works to schools under the scheme. Extensive funding was given for improvements to school grounds, including fencing and levelling ground for play areas, involving terracing and retaining walls. This work created many large school ovals, which prior to this period were mostly cleared of trees but not landscaped. These play areas became a standard inclusion within Queensland state schools and a characteristic element. At Nundah State School, intermittent relief workers carried out improvements to the playing field in 1933 for an estimated cost of £300.

In June 1932 the Forgan Smith Labor Government came to power from a campaign that advocated increased government spending to counter the effects of the Depression. The government embarked on a large public works building programme designed to promote the employment of local skilled workers, the purchase of local building materials and the production of commodious, low maintenance buildings which would be a long-term asset to the state. This building programme included: government offices, schools and colleges; university buildings; court houses and police stations; hospitals and asylums; and gaols.

Many of the programmes have had lasting beneficial effects for the citizens of Queensland, including the construction of masonry brick school buildings across the state. Most were designed in a classical idiom as this projects the sense of stability and optimism which the government sought to convey through the architecture of its public buildings.

The construction of substantial brick school buildings in prosperous or growing suburban areas and regional centres during the 1930s provided tangible proof of the government's commitment to remedy the unemployment situation. The Queensland Public Works Department and Department of Public Instruction were extremely enthusiastic about the brick school buildings designed in the 1930s. They were considered monuments to progress embodying the most modern principles of the ideal education environment.

After years of requests by the school committee and parents for a more up-to-date school, construction of a brick school building at Nundah State School was approved and commenced in 1934. The building would run north–south parallel to Bage Street, with a lateral wing on either end, and would be completed in three stages: north wing (1935); the range (1941); and the south wing (1951, with the boys' toilet block in the southwest corner evident by 1946). The scheme, of brick with concrete foundations and tile roof, was to ultimately accommodate 1000 pupils.

Depression-era brick school buildings form a recognisable and important type, exhibiting many common characteristics. Frequently, they were two storeys above an open undercroft and built to accommodate up to 1000 students. They adopted a symmetrical plan form and often exhibited a prominent central entry. The plan arrangement was similar to that of timber buildings, being only one classroom deep, accessed by a long straight verandah or corridor. Due to their long plan forms of multiple wings, they could be built in stages if necessary; resulting in some complete designs never being realised. Ideally, the classrooms would face south with the verandah on the north but little concession was made for this and almost all Depression-era brick school buildings faced the primary boundary road, regardless of orientation. Classrooms were commonly divided by folding timber partitions and the undercroft was used as covered play space, storage, toilets and other functions.

Despite their similarities, each Depression-era brick school building was individually designed by a DPW architect, which resulted in a wide range of styles and ornamental features being utilised within the overall set. These styles, which were derived from contemporary tastes and fashions, included: Arts and Crafts, typified by half-timbered gable-ends; Spanish Mission, with round-arched openings and decorative parapets; and Neo-classical, with pilasters, columns and large triangular pediments. Over time, variations occurred in building size, decorative treatment, and climatic-responsive features. Where other functions, such as infants classes or vocational training, were required, standard rooms designed to accommodate these functions were incorporated into the building plan. The chief architect during this period was Andrew Baxter Leven (1885–1966), who was employed by the Queensland Government Works Department from 1910 to 1951, and was Chief Architect and Quantity Surveyor from 1933 to 1951.

Construction of the northern wing by day labour commenced after the former head teacher's residence, which stood on the building site, was sold for removal. The hip-roofed wing, aligned east–west and perpendicular to Bage Street, consisted of two storeys above an undercroft. Each floor comprised four classrooms for 40 pupils, a cloakroom and connecting corridors. By means of folding partitions each floor of this wing could be converted into one large room. One classroom on the first floor was raised 600 millimetres (24 in) to form a stage. The undercroft comprised lavatory accommodation for girls and female teachers and a concreted play area. The building's estimated cost was £9,890. Temporary brick walls with lime mortar and a fibrous-cement gable infill were constructed where the range was to be connected.

The first stage of Nundah State School's brick school building (now called Block A) was opened by the Minister for Public Instruction, Frank Cooper, on 5 October 1935 at the 70th anniversary of the school's commencement. Around the same time, retaining walls to the north and west of Block A were completed, followed by walls along the corner of Bage Street to the east and Boyd Road to the north in 1940. The concrete retaining walls had metal chain wire fences above and the wall to the north of Block A had steps accessing the tennis- basketball court area below.

In 1940, plans for completion of Nundah State School's brick school building were finalised. They were drawn by Douglas FW Roberts who was also responsible for the plans for Toowoomba East State School.

Overall the building was to be a strongly axial and symmetrically arranged two-storey structure, above an undercroft, that featured both Neo-classical and Arts and Crafts-style design influences. In addition to the existing northern wing, the 1940 plans show a range that aligned north–south and a southern wing that mirrored the north. The tiled hip-roofed range, with its projecting central entrance bay and lateral hip-roofed wings, addressed Bage Street to the east. The face brick exterior featured rendered stringcourses and quoins framing the windows, and the undercroft had an ashlar finish. Exterior windows comprised banks of eight-light casements, with fanlights, sheltered by continuous tiled hoods that had decorative timber brackets. The front entrance bay had a stepped parapeted gable and a divided staircase that led to a first floor flat-roofed porch. The rear entrance bay had internal stairs, flanked by cloakrooms, and diagonal stairs from the parade ground accessed first floor flat-roofed landings at the junctions between the range and the wings.

The first and second floors contained classrooms, offices and storerooms while the undercroft comprised play areas with lavatories in the northwest (girls) and southwest (boys) corners. The range had four classrooms on the first floor, and five classrooms and a teachers room on the second floor. A central hall, flanked by teachers rooms, connected the first floor entrance porch with a corridor that ran along the western side of the range. Mirroring the north, the proposed southern wing contained four classrooms on each floor, separated by folding partitions. All classrooms were 21 feet (6.4 m) wide. Internal stairs and adjacent cloak rooms at the eastern ends of the wings accessed corridors that ran along the southern side of the north wing and northern side of the south wing, and connected with the perpendicular corridors of the range. The corridors were 8 feet (2.4 m) wide and had red oxide concrete floors, six-light double-hung sash windows, and panelled double-leaf classroom doors with fanlights.

The second stage the range – was authorised by Queensland's Executive Council on 7 March 1940 and work commenced soon afterwards. This stage was opened on 28 August 1941 by the Minister for Public Instruction, Harry Bruce. The original stone step of the 1865 school was built into the wall over the front steps of the building. Ground improvements were also undertaken in 1941, with the area in front of the new school wing excavated to a level that conformed with the general scheme.

Soon afterwards, World War II's impact escalated for Australia, with the entry of Japan into the conflict. Due to fears of a Japanese invasion, the Queensland Government closed all coastal state schools in January 1942, and although most schools reopened on 2 March 1942, student attendance was optional until the war ended. Slit trenches, for protecting the students from Japanese air raids, were also dug at Queensland state schools, including Nundah, often by parents and staff.

Typically, schools were a focus for civilian duty during wartime. At many schools, students and staff members grew produce and flowers for donation to local hospitals and organised fundraising and the donation of useful items to Australian soldiers on active service. Nundah State School's grounds were used by Air Raid Precautions (ARP) wardens for drills and meetings from May 1942 until April 1944.

Ground improvements and the construction of the brick school building continued during the war years. By 1943 a curved front driveway and central garden bed had been formed. Drawings from 1941 and 1943 detailed the proposed undercroft boys lavatories connected to the southwest corner of the range, indicating that they were to be built in advance of the eastern end and upper stories of the southern wing. The area south of the toilet block was to be excavated and a new bank formed. Works were authorised to be carried out by day labour and the toilet block is evident in aerial photos by March 1946.

In the post-World War II period, enrolments at Nundah State School escalated. Considerable growth in the area, particularly of housing in the neighbouring suburb of Wavell Heights, increased the Nundah and district population to 11,234 in 1947 and the school population increased as well. At the beginning of 1945 student numbers were about 800 but rose to over 1600 in 1954.

The Department of Public Instruction was largely unprepared for the enormous demand for state education that began in the late 1940s and continued well into the 1960s. This was a nationwide occurrence resulting from immigration and the unprecedented population growth now termed the "baby boom". Queensland schools were overcrowded and, to cope, many new buildings were constructed and existing buildings were extended.

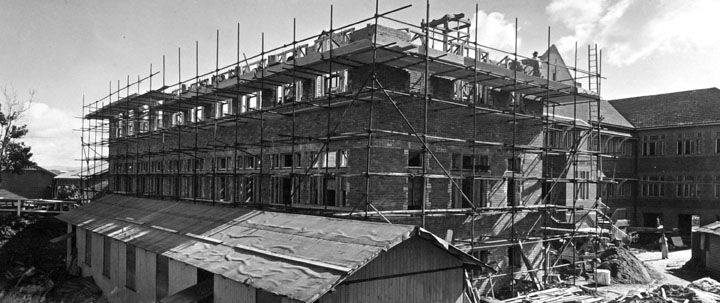
3rd stage under construction, 1950

Construction of the third stage of the brick school building was completed in time for its opening on 31 March 1951 by the Minister for Public Instruction, George Devries.

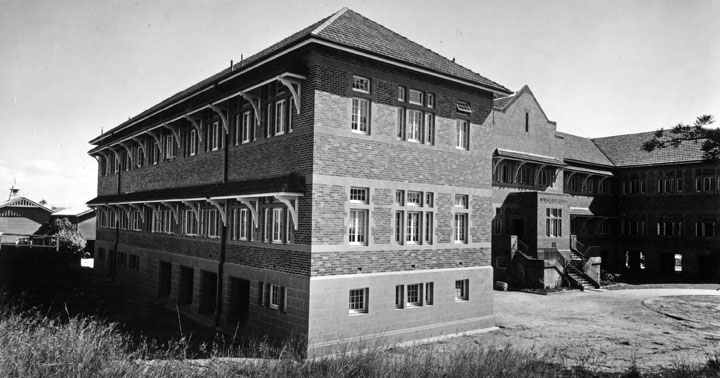
3rd stage completed, 1951

In the years following World War II the overriding concern for the Department of Public Instruction was the need to build school buildings as expeditiously and economically as possible. Queensland schools were faced with enormous overcrowding and a lack of resources. However, the Queensland Government and community saw education as a low priority and provided the department with only a small budget. Also, educationalists rejected the previous designs of school buildings, considering them outdated and favoured "lighter, loosely grouped, flexible" buildings.

With increasing enrolments at Nundah State School in the 1950s, it was necessary to erect new buildings and extend existing ones. In 1954 suburban timber school building was connected to a new two-storey, gable-roofed timber building (Block F) by a verandah walkway. Alterations were also made to its teachers room, including the removal of the northern wall and relocation of the northern window to the western wall, to accommodate a new 15-by-12-foot (4.6 m × 3.7 m) staff room extension with a medical services / store room underneath.

The suburban timber school building was extended in 1955 and again in 1956, sandwiching the existing 1915–16 building. The 1955 extension added a 24-by-20-foot (7.3 m × 6.1 m) classroom to the eastern end. It had a bank of casements with fanlights on the southern wall and the northern verandah wall had a bank of double-hung sashes with fanlights, which were also added to each of the three existing classrooms. The existing verandah was extended, with steps relocated and enclosed balustrade bag racks added. The 1956 extension comprised a 28-by-20-foot (8.5 m × 6.1 m) highset timber classroom over a play area, at the western end of the building. The new classroom had doors opening onto the existing verandah and banks of awning windows on the northern and southern walls. The western wall had a single row of awning windows with a shade over. The weatherboard cladding extended to the north, south and western sides of the understorey, which was concreted and had hardwood seating to the perimeter.

In 1955 a highset, gable-roofed, brick veneer building (Block B) was built on the edge of the concrete retaining wall to the northwest of brick school building. The construction of a high-set brick veneer building (Block C) to the east of the suburban timber school building in 1956, provided a link between it and the brick school building. The demolition of the adjacent 1912 infants classroom building c. 1965 required extension of the verandah balustrade of the suburban timber school building and regrading of ground to the north.

Improvements to the school's sporting facilities were made post-World War II with the addition of a swimming pool in 1956.

Changes to the Depression-era brick school building have occurred during its lifetime; however, the building remains substantially intact and retains a high degree of integrity. In 1962 a tuck shop was built at the southern end of the undercroft. In 1977 part of the first floor northern wing was remodelled for a Remedial Resources Room. Between 1998 and 2000, under the Building Better School initiative, alterations to the central range included demolition forming wide openings in the masonry walls to combine classrooms, replacement of double-leaf doors with singles, division of the northern teachers' room to form a health room and office, and conversion of the cloak rooms to offices and kitchenettes. The classroom at the western end of the second floor of the southern wing was also extended to occupy the corridor, with the corridor wall removed and a partition and doorway inserted. Cloak rooms in the wings have been enclosed for use as staff or store rooms, and folding partitions between many of the classrooms have been removed to combine classrooms. Bulkheads remain demonstrating the original layout, and two sets of early folding partitions are retained in the southern wing.

The suburban timber school building has been subject to alterations associated with the 1950s additions, but remains fairly intact internally and retains its early three-classroom layout, decorative pressed-metal lined and coved ceilings, square ceiling-rose vents and metal tie rods. The prominent ventilation roof fleche appears to have been removed by 1974 (likely associated with re-sheeting of the roof) but the verandah wall framing retains evidence of former floor-level ventilation flaps either side of the doors. Traces of a partition that divided the central classroom from c. 1977 are also evident in the ceiling. Modern partitions have formed small offices in the eastern (1955) classroom.

Since the major expansion during the 1950s, other buildings have been added to the site. A dental clinic was erected in 1975, and in the 21st century prep school buildings were constructed west of the suburban timber school building (2006–14), a resource centre (2009) was built to the north of the brick school building, and a school hall (2011) was erected on the double tennis courts' site adjacent to the swimming pool on the northern side of the school, which in 2016 houses the WWI honour board.

Nundah State School celebrated its centenary during September and October 1965. Celebrations included a fancy dress ball at Cloudland Ballroom; the opening of a new Centenary Library; a church service in the school grounds, an open day at the school, a concert by Infants School children, an operetta by Grade 7 pupils, an open swim at the school pool, and a procession from Nundah to the school playing field for its Centenary Fete. In conjunction with these celebrations, a centenary publication was produced.

Other commemorative features exist at the school. A silky oak tree (Grevillea robusta) commemorating 100 years of state education in Queensland (1875–1975) was planted in the northeast corner of school grounds. Set within the rose garden on the Bage Street side of the brick school building is a memorial commemorating those who served their country during World War II, which was unveiled in November 1995.

In 2016, the school continues to operate from its original site. It retains the Department of Public Works Depression-era brick school building and the suburban timber school building with extensions, set in landscaped grounds with sporting facilities, playing areas, retaining walls and mature shade trees. Nundah State School is important to Nundah and its district, as a key social focus for the community, as generations of students have been taught there and many social events held in the school's grounds and buildings since its establishment.

== Description ==
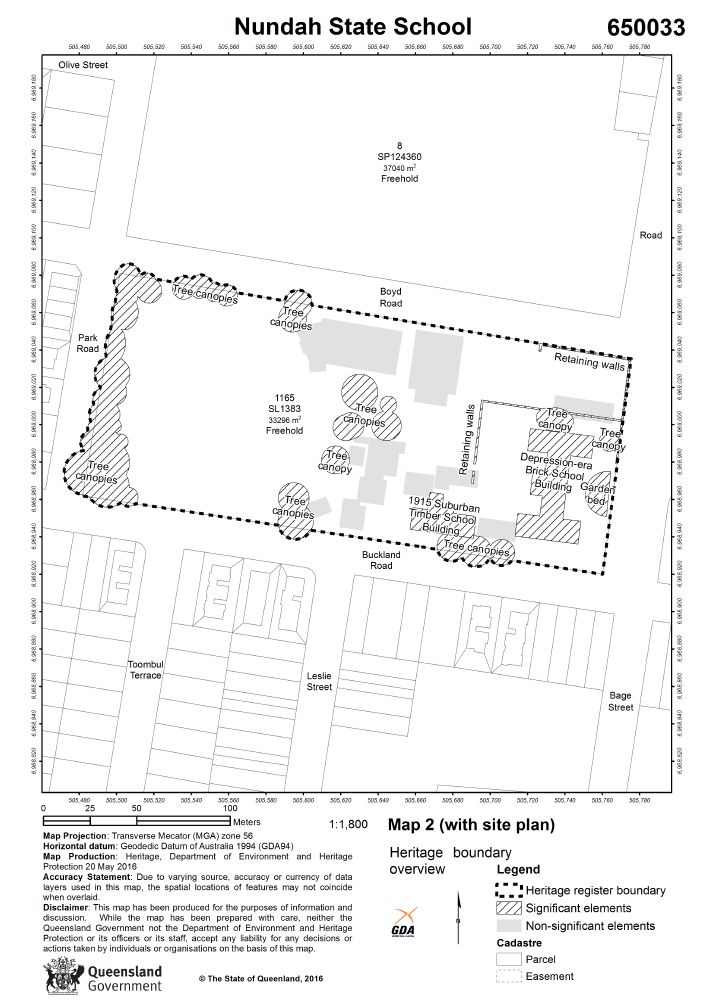
Site map, 2016

Nundah State School occupies an elevated 3.24 hectares (8.0 acres) site within Nundah, a residential suburb approximately 8 kilometres (5.0 mi) northeast of the Brisbane CBD. Facing Bage Street to the east, the rectangular site slopes down to the west and is bounded to the south by Buckland Road, to the west by Park Road and to the north by Boyd Road. The school complex comprises buildings and landscape features from several periods of design and construction. Buildings and other elements of cultural heritage significance are located at the eastern end of the site and include:

- a prominent Depression-era brick school building (Block A – 1935, 1941, 1946–51), addressing Bage Street
- a suburban timber school building (Block D – 1915, with 1916, 1955 & 1956 extensions) along Buckland Road
- a WWI Honour Board (1916) housed in the modern school hall
- a parade ground to the west of Block A
- various retaining walls (c. 1935, 1940)
- a curved entrance driveway and landscaped gardens to the east of Block A (c. 1943)
- a playing field at the western end of the site; and a variety of mature shade trees

=== Depression-era brick school building (Block A) ===
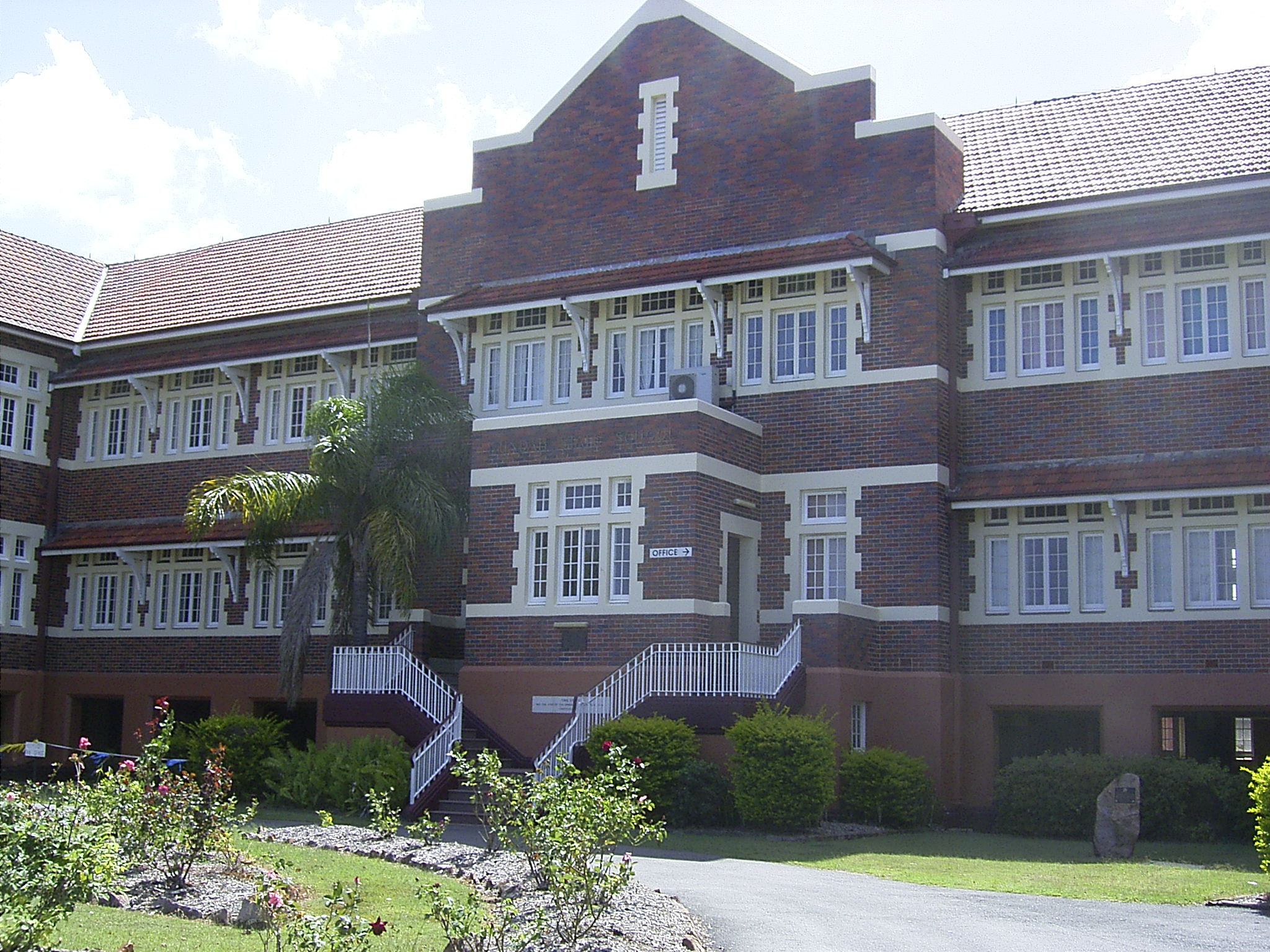
Block A, 2007

Block A is a symmetrical, masonry structure of two storeys, above an undercroft level. The building comprises three sections: a range (1941) running north–south; and two lateral wings, the northern (1935) and southern (1946–51), projecting on an east–west axis. Three-storey projecting entrance bays are centred on the eastern (front) and western sides of the range; and flat-roofed first-floor bays at the junction of the range and the wings have diagonal stairs that access the parade ground at the rear. The building's intersecting hipped roofs are terracotta-tiled.

The building is elegantly composed with a combination of Neo-classical and Arts and Crafts-style detailing. Constructed from load-bearing face brick walls, it has rendered decorative elements on the first and second floors, and rendered walls and piers with an ashlar finish to the undercroft level. The stretcher bond walls comprise bricks in a range of hues (from orange to dark brown), resulting in a textured appearance, and retain areas of tuck pointing. Along the north, east and south elevations, continuous window hoods with decorative timber brackets shelter the first and second-storey windows. Window openings (on all sides except the western end of the wings) are framed by rendered mullions, string courses and quoins, and contain banks of timber-framed, eight-light casement windows, with fanlights above.

The front projecting bay frames the main entrance and is topped by a stepped, gabled brick parapet that has rendered capping and a centred rectangular vent. Divided stairs flank a first floor flat-roofed entrance porch. The clear-finished timber double entrance doors are panelled and glazed, with fanlights above. The stairs have concrete treads, and decorative rendered stringers and metal balustrades. A commemorative stone, set within the rendered eastern wall, reads "THIS STONE WAS THE STEP OF THE ORIGINAL NUNDAH STATE SCHOOL ERECTED 1865", with "NUNDAH STATE SCHOOL" in metal letters mounted on the brickwork above.

The interior layout of the building is symmetrical, with the northern and southern wings mirrored, and the first floor layout approximately repeated on the second floor. Internal stairs are located at the eastern ends of the wings and in the central western bay of the range, flanked by offices (former cloak rooms). Corridors along the western side of the range connect with corridors on the adjacent sides of the northern and southern wings, and provide access to linearly arranged classrooms, offices and storerooms. The range has a central entrance hall, flanked by offices, and two classrooms and a medical room (formerly four classrooms) on the first floor; and three classrooms (formerly five) and a staff room on the second floor. The second floor of both wings and the first floor of the southern wing have two large classrooms each. One classroom on the first floor (southern wing) has been extended to occupy the corridor, with part of the corridor wall removed. The first floor of the northern wing contains a classroom and two large offices (formerly four classrooms); the western office retains a raised floor (former stage). Classrooms throughout the building retain bulkheads that indicate the original layout of dividing partitions.

Most classrooms and offices have plaster walls, timber-framed floors covered in modern carpet, and flat-sheeted ceilings with painted timber battens. Stairs are of painted concrete and have metal and timber (range and northern wing) or rendered (southern wing) balustrades. Corridors have concrete floors with coved edges and flat plaster ceilings, with those on the second floor (range and southern wing) featuring painted timber battens. Early timber joinery is retained throughout the building, including: double-hung sash windows (to the corridors); and panelled timber doors. Most windows and doors retain their fanlights and early hardware. Two sets of original timber folding doors, with glazed inserts, are retained in classrooms on the first and second floors of the northern wing, which is rare. The store room (former cloak room) on the second floor of the northern wing retains its early brown stained ceiling battens and red oxide concrete floor.

The undercroft level of the range is largely open play-space. Toilets are located at the western ends of the wings; a tuckshop encloses the eastern end of the northern wing; and a storage room encloses the eastern end of the southern wing. The undercroft has a concrete slab floor. Timber framing is exposed in parts of the range's ceiling, with the remainder mostly flat-sheeted. The piers and walls are stop-chamfered face brick.

=== Suburban Timber School Building (Block D) ===
Block D is a long, timber-framed building, orientated east–west, with a north-facing verandah. Constructed in phases, it comprises a central section (1915) of three classrooms, between an eastern classroom (1955) and a western classroom (1956), with two teachers rooms (1916 with 1954 extension) attached to the verandah. The building is highset at the western end and lowset to the east, due to the sloping of the site. The gabled roof is sheeted with modern corrugated metal and has five modern ridge vents. The teachers rooms have a hipped roof.

The exterior is clad with timber weatherboards. The southern wall of the central section has three large banks of timber-framed casement windows, with pivot and angled fanlights. The 1916 teachers room has two-light double hung sash windows to the west (relocated 1954) and east (which has a battened skillion hood).

The verandah has a raked ceiling lined with V-jointed (VJ), tongue-and-groove (T&G) boards. Floors are timber and bag rack balustrades are clad externally with corrugated metal sheeting. Timber stairs with three-rail balustrades access the parade ground to the north. Verandah steps connect Block D with Block C to the east, and a verandah walkway connects to Block F to the north.

The northern verandah walls are lined with a single skin of VJ T&G boards and have double-hung sashes, with pivot fanlights. Above the flush-panelled double-leaf doors of the central classrooms are pivot fanlights, and the surrounding wall framing retains evidence where floor-level ventilation flaps may have been positioned.

The interior of the three central classrooms is lined with VJ T&G boards. Dividing partitions retain VJ boarded bulkheads, with flat-sheeting lining the openings formerly enclosed by folding partitions. All three classrooms retain highly decorative pressed-metal coved ceilings, with centred square ceiling-rose vents and metal tie-rods. The timber floors of all classrooms are covered with modern carpet and other floor linings.

The understorey has a concrete floor and comprises mostly open play space. The building is set on a combination of concrete stumps and metal posts. The southern side is clad with corrugated metal, including a store room at the western end.

The 1950s classrooms are detailed externally in keeping with the original building. However, the southern walls have large banks of awning windows, with fanlights, and the western wall has a single row of awnings. The western classroom extends the full width of the building. The understorey of the western classroom and the 1954 teachers room are enclosed, with vertical timber strips indicating the location of extension joins. The interior walls and ceilings are flat-sheeted. The eastern classroom contains small offices with modern partitions.

=== Landscape Elements ===
The school grounds are well established, with sporting facilities including a generous playing field (c. 1933) with embankments at the western end of the site.

Many mature trees are located within the school grounds, including large fig (Ficus sp.), jacaranda (Jacaranda mimosifolia), poinciana (Delonix regia) and leopard trees (Flindersia maculosa) surrounding the playing field. Various other mature shade trees across the site include a hoop pine (Araucaria cunninghamii), paper bark (Melaleuca quinquenervia), and a 1975 commemorative silky oak (Grevillea robusta) northeast of Block A.

The eastern end of the sloping site is terraced by several Depression-era concrete retaining walls. These are located:

- north and west of Block A, surrounding the parade ground;
- around the northeast corner of the site, along Bage Street and Boyd Road.

The main entrance from Bage Street comprises a curved driveway around landscaped rose gardens that are centred to the east of Block A. The parade ground (1936) west of Block A allows significant views to be obtained of the building's eastern elevation.

An Honour Board (1916) is located in the modern school hall building, listing the names of former students who served in World War I (WWI). It comprises a decorative, embossed copper plaque with a timber backing board, and reads "ROLL OF HONOR 1914-1919, NUNDAH STATE SCHOOL" above rows of individual name plaques.

== Heritage listing ==
Nundah State School was listed on the Queensland Heritage Register on 15 July 2016 having satisfied the following criteria.

The place is important in demonstrating the evolution or pattern of Queensland's history.

Nundah State School (established in 1865 as German Station National School) is important in demonstrating the evolution of state education and its associated architecture in Queensland. The place retains fine, representative examples of standard government designs, which were architectural responses to prevailing government educational philosophies.

The Depression-era brick school building (1935–51), retaining walls and improvements to the playing field are the result of the State Government's building and relief work programmes during the 1930s that stimulated the economy and provided work for men unemployed as a result of the Great Depression.

The suburban timber school building (1915–16) represents the culmination of years of experimentation with light, classroom size and elevation, by the Department of Public Works. Later extensions (1955, 1956) represent the Department of Public Works' response to overcrowding in schools due to population growth after World War II.

The World War I Honour Board is important in demonstrating the school community's involvement in a major world event. War memorials, including honour boards, are a tribute to those who served, and those who died, from a particular community. They are an important element of Queensland's towns and cities and are also important in demonstrating a common pattern of commemoration across Queensland and Australia.

The large, suburban site with mature trees, sporting facilities, retaining walls and other landscaping features demonstrates the importance of play and aesthetics in the education of children.

The place is important in demonstrating the principal characteristics of a particular class of cultural places.

Nundah State School is important in demonstrating the principal characteristics of a Queensland state school. These include: teaching buildings constructed to standard designs; and generous, landscaped sites, with mature trees, assembly and play areas, and sporting facilities.

The substantial Depression-era brick school building is an excellent, highly-intact example of its type and retains a high degree of integrity. It demonstrates the principal characteristics of Depression-era Brick Schools, including: its symmetrically arranged two-storey form, with an undercroft; high-quality design with ornamental features; face brick exterior; terracotta-tiled roof; and projecting central entrance bay. The building has a linear layout, with rooms accessed by corridors, and an undercroft accommodating open play space and toilets.

The suburban timber school building demonstrates principal characteristics of its type. It retains its highset timber-framed structure with play space underneath, north-facing verandah, banks of casement windows, with fanlights, and projecting teachers room. The interior, with its symmetrical plan form, coved ceiling lined with pressed metal, partition bulkheads and early wall linings, is highly intact.

The place is important because of its aesthetic significance.

Through its elegant composition of formal and decorative elements, substantial size and face brick exterior, the Depression-era brick school building at Nundah State School has aesthetic significance due to its expressive attributes, by which the Department of Public Works sought to convey the concepts of progress and permanence.

The building is also significant for its streetscape contribution. Standing on an open, elevated site, it is an attractive and prominent feature of the area.

The place has a strong or special association with a particular community or cultural group for social, cultural or spiritual reasons.

Schools have always played an important part in Queensland communities. They typically retain significant and enduring connections with former pupils, parents, and teachers; provide a venue for social interaction and volunteer work; and are a source of pride, symbolising local progress and aspirations.

Nundah State School has a strong and ongoing association with the Nundah and district community. It was established in 1865 through the fundraising efforts of the local community and generations of children have been taught there. The place is important for its contribution to the educational development of Nundah and district and is a prominent community focal point and gathering place for social and commemorative events with widespread community support.

== Notable students ==
- Thomas Bridges, Member of the Queensland Legislative Assembly
- Lou Jensen, Member of the Queensland Legislative Assembly
- Elina Mottram, architect

== See also ==
- History of state education in Queensland
- List of schools in Greater Brisbane
