= Frank Cumbrae-Stewart =

Barrister, professor

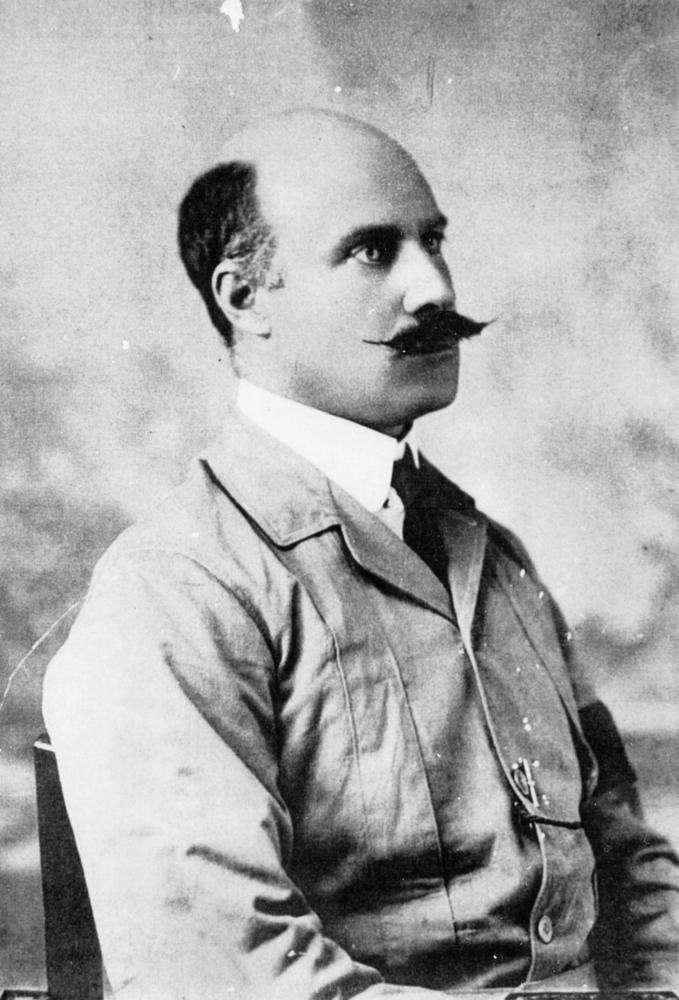
Professor Francis William Sutton Cumbrae-Stewart

Francis William Sutton Cumbrae-Stewart, KC (1865–1938) was a barrister and university professor in Australia.

== Early life ==
Frank Cumbrae-Stewart was born on 27 January 1865 at Riversleigh, Canterbury, New Zealand, son of Francis Edward Stewart and his wife Agnes (née Park). He was educated at Melbourne Grammar School and Geelong Grammar School. He matriculated at Christ Church, Oxford in 1883, and graduated Bachelor of Arts in 1887. He was admitted to the Bar by the Inner Temple in 1887 and in Queensland in 1890. On 24 January 1906 he married Zina Beatrice Selwyn Hammond at St Andrew's Church of England, Brighton.

== Career ==
Frank Cumbrae-Stewart was a barrister and King's Counsel and was appointed the foundation registrar and librarian of the newly established University of Queensland in 1910. Among his numerous involvements, he was a founder and president of the Royal Historical Society of Queensland and a founder and trustee of the John Oxley Library. Historical papers he authored included histories of the Brisbane River, Brisbane bridges and surveyors of the Queensland coast. In 1926 he became Garrick Professor of Law at the University of Queensland.

Both Cumbrae-Stewart and his wife Zina were prominent and active citizens of Brisbane early in the 20th century. Their home Scott Street Flats in Kangaroo Point is listed on the Queensland Heritage Register.

The registrar's role in Professor Cumbrae-Stewart's era was widely regarded as rigid and authoritarian. His physical presence was described as commanding and daunting. He was described as having an erect military bearing, complete with a stiffly waxed moustache. These qualities came into their own on formal university occasions, and contemporaries recalled that his impressive stature added an air of grandeur to University processions at graduation ceremonies.

== Later life ==
In 1936, Frank Cumbrae-Stewart retired from the University of Queensland and moved to Melbourne. He died on 24 March 1938 at South Yarra and was buried in Burwood Cemetery.
