= National Council of Women of Queensland =

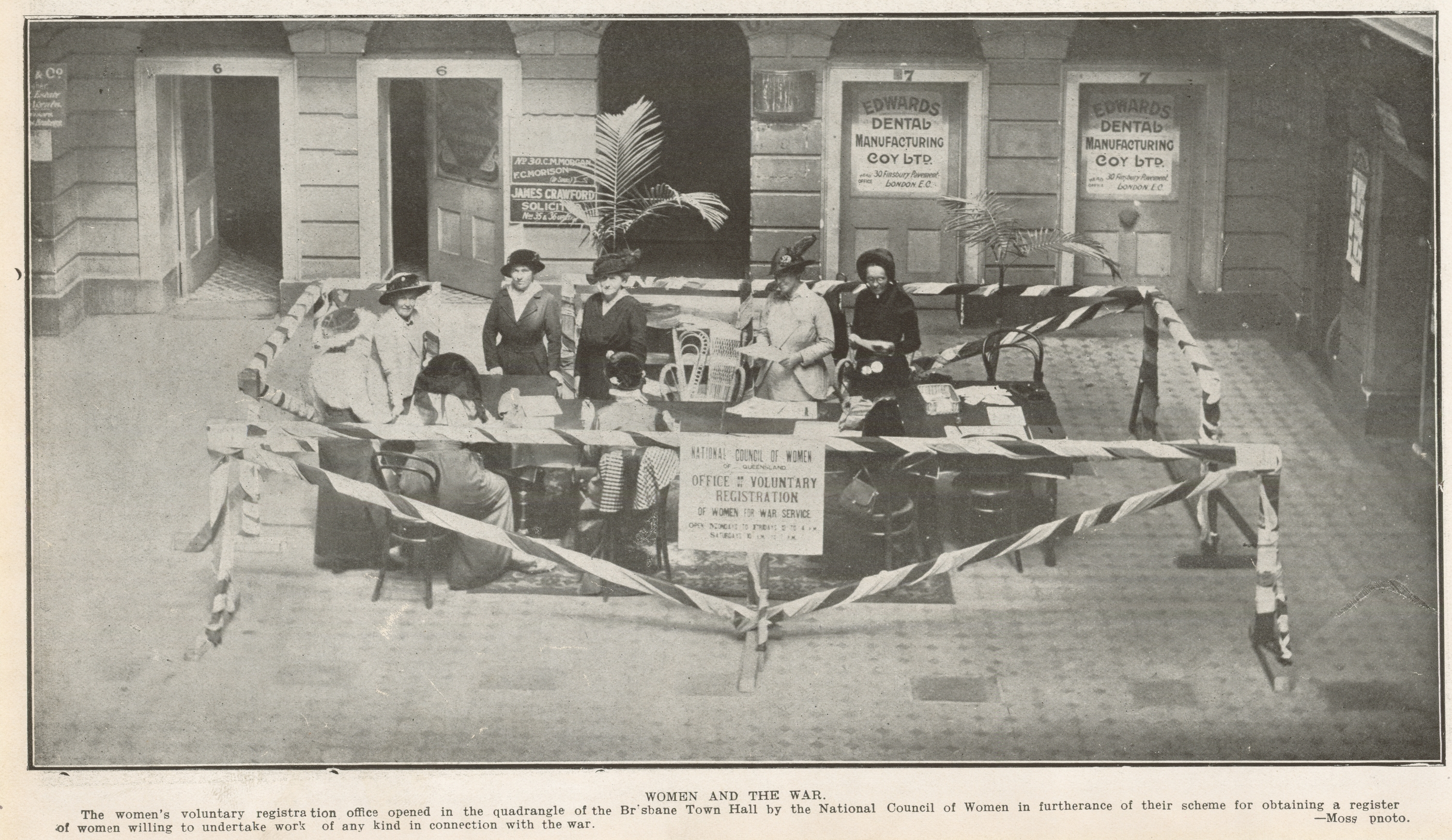
National Council of Women of Queensland in the Brisbane Town Hall, signing up women to do war work, September 1915

The National Council of Women of Queensland is an umbrella organisation in Queensland, Australia. It unites other organisations with humanitarian and educational objectives for women and is non-party-political, non-sectarian, and not-for-profit. It is affiliated with the National Council of Women of Australia and the International Council of Women.

== History ==
Inspired by the creation of the International Council of Women in Washington, USA in 1888, a number of similar organisations were established in the various Australian states. The National Council of Women of Queensland was established in 1905 with 21 member organisations. Mrs J.T. Bell was the first president.

== Notable members ==
- Freda Bage, biologist and first Head of the Women's College at the University of Queensland
- Phyllis Cilento, medical practitioner and journalist, specialising in the health of mothers and children
- Christina Jane Corrie, suffragist
- Zina Cumbrae-Stewart, philanthropic volunteer
- Irene Longman, first woman elected to the Queensland Legislative Assembly
