= Zina Cumbrae-Stewart =

Australian philanthropist

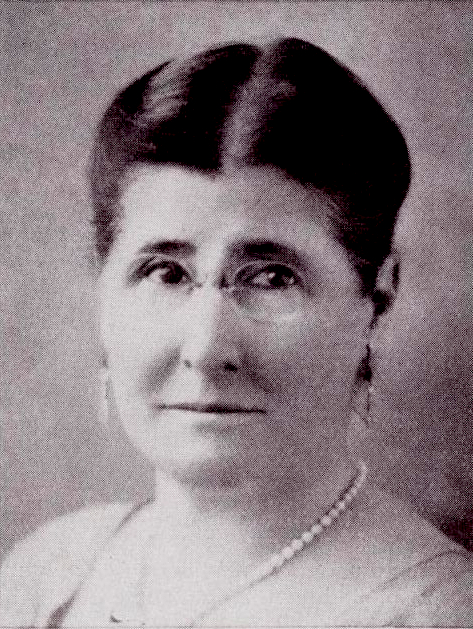
Zina Cumbrae-Stewart, 1939

Zina Beatrice Selwyn Cumbrae-Stewart (née Hammond) (1868–1956) was a prominent philanthropic volunteer in Brisbane, Queensland, Australia.

== Early life ==
Zina Beatrice Selwyn Hammond was born on 30 August 1868 at Brighton, Victoria, the daughter of Robert K. Hammond and his wife Jessie Duncan (née Grant). In 1875 her father Robert K. Hammond died leaving her mother a widow of ten children. Up until the bank crash of 1893 Zina had a lively social life in the Brighton society. After the crash Zina returned to Mrs R. Sadleir Forster's Ladies School, St Kilda, where she was educated, to teach drawing. Then on 24 January 1906 she married one of her pupil's brothers named Francis William Sutton Cumbrae-Stewart at St Andrew's Church of England, Brighton. Together, they lived in Brisbane with their only child, Francis Denys, who was born in 1908.

== Community work ==
Zina Cumbrae-Stewart and her husband Frank were prominent and active citizens of Brisbane early in the 20th century, where her husband was a barrister and professor of law at the University of Queensland.

A deeply committed evangelical Anglican, Zina Cumbrae-Stewart was an executive member of the Australian Red Cross in Queensland for twenty-two years, was an original member of the Mother's Union and its president for nine years and president of the National Council of Women of Queensland for nine years. She helped found the Queensland Social Service League in 1931 to cope with problems related to the Depression. Other societies she was involved with included the Mothercraft Association, the Traveller's Aid Society and the Shakespeare Society. Zina Cumbrae-Stewart was the first woman to speak from the platform of the Brisbane City Hall and had early involvement in educational broadcasting. In 1936 she claimed that she had attended 360 committee meetings that year.

Her home Scott Street Flats in Kangaroo Point is listed on the Queensland Heritage Register.

== Later life ==
Her husband Frank retired in 1936 and died in Melbourne in 1938. On 31 July 1956 Zina Cumbrae-Stewart died in Hobart where she was living with her son. She was buried with her husband in the Burwood Cemetery in Melbourne on 2 August 1956.
