= Overview of news media phone hacking scandals =

Phone hacking by news organizations became the subject of scandals that raised concerns about illegal acquisition of confidential information by news media organizations in the United Kingdom, the United States and Australia between 1995 and 2012. The scandal had been simmering since 2002 but broke wide open in July 2011 with the disclosure that a murdered teenage girl's mobile phone had been hacked by a newspaper looking for a story. The scandals involved multiple organizations, and include the News of the World royal phone hacking scandal, the News International phone hacking scandal, the 2011 News Corporation scandals, and the Metropolitan Police role in the News International phone hacking scandal.

By 2002, the practice of publications using private investigators to acquire confidential information was widespread in the United Kingdom, with some individuals using illegal methods. Information was allegedly acquired by accessing private voicemail accounts, hacking into computers, making false statements to officials to obtain confidential information, entrapment, blackmail, burglaries, theft of mobile phones and making payments to officials in exchange for confidential information. The kind of information acquired illegally included private communication, physical location of individuals, bank account records, medical records, phone bills, tax files, and organisational strategies.

Individuals involved in the scandal included victims, perpetrators, investigators, solicitors, and responsible oversight officials. Victims of these illegal methods included celebrities, politicians, law enforcement officials, solicitors, and ordinary citizens. As this illegal activity became apparent, arrests were made and some convictions achieved. Upon learning their privacy had been violated, some victims retained solicitors and filed suit against news media companies and their agents, in some cases receiving substantial financial payments for violation of privacy. Successful suits and publicity from investigative news articles led to further disclosures, including the names of more victims, more documentary evidence of wrongdoing, admissions of wrongdoing, and related payments. Allegations were made of poor judgement evidence destruction, and coverup by news media executives and law enforcement officials. As a result, new investigations were initiated including some in the US and Australia, and several senior executives and police officials resigned. There were also significant commercial consequences of the scandal.

There was evidence that illegal acquisition of confidential information continued at least into 2010. Solicitors representing victims were targeted for surveillance by a news media organisation being sued as recently as 2011. Illegal payments by news media agents to public officials continued into 2012.

== Early investigations (1990s–2005) ==
During this period, illegal acquisition of confidential information for developing news stories was widespread. News media journalists, editors and executives, along with private investigators, public officials, and police officers, all benefited from the practice. Little was done to inhibit it.

=== Victims ===
In 2000, eight-year-old Sarah Payne was murdered by a paedophile. News of the World and its then editor, Rebekah Brooks (née Wade), championed the campaign led by Sarah's mother for legislation to notify parents if a child sex offender lived nearby. Brooks gave Sarah's mother a mobile phone to facilitate communication. The phone was subsequently hacked by an agent of News of the World.

Six months later, Sir Paul McCartney left a voicemail message for his then girlfriend, Heather Mills, trying to work things out. Mirror Group journalists hacked the phone to listen in. Piers Morgan, editor of the Daily Mirror at the time, later acknowledged listening to it.

When teenager Milly Dowler disappeared in 2002, agents of News of the World hacked into her mobile phone messages hoping to acquire information they could use for a story. Surrey police were reportedly advised of this hacking at the time, but no action was taken.

Journalists working at News of the World after Andy Coulson became chief editor in 2003 claimed that Coulson talked freely about using the "dark arts," including phone hacking, and that "everybody knew. The office cat knew." There were thousands of phone hacking victims during this period from all walks of life. The Metropolitan Police Service and the Information Commissioner's Office (ICO) accumulated huge amounts of evidence that confidential information was being obtained illegally for use by news organisations including News Corporation's subsidiary News International (News of the World, The Sun, The Times), Mirror Group Newspapers (Daily Mirror), Express Newspapers (Daily Star, Daily Express), and others. But almost a decade was to pass before dogged investigative reporting by The Guardian newspaper generated public outrage over the invasions of privacy that had been covered up through wilful blindness, intimidation, and suppression of evidence by news organisations, law enforcement organisations, and politicians.

During 2003 and 2004 in the United States, someone at News Corporation's advertising subsidiary, News America Marketing, repeatedly hacked into a computer at rival FLOORgraphics to obtain confidential product and contract information with which to put FLOORgraphics at a disadvantage in a brutal competitive battle. The FBI initiated an investigation, but little effort was put into it. In 2006 an editor of News of the World reportedly hacked into the computer of a British Army intelligence officer in Northern Ireland who had responsibility for contact with an agent embedded in the Provisional IRA and potentially at high risk for assassination if his whereabouts became known. Again, law enforcement officials did little to investigate the charges at the time.

Before public outrage forced rigorous investigations, evidence that several thousand UK citizens including celebrities, Members of Parliament, murder victims, their relatives, or anyone else who happened to be nearby, had been victims of phone hacking remained for many years consigned unexamined by officers of the Metropolitan Police Service to storage in garbage bags in the bowels of New Scotland Yard.

=== Operation Nigeria ===
Private investigators and their sources who were illegally providing confidential information to News of the World were also engaged in a variety of other illegal activities. Between 1999 and 2003, several were convicted for crimes including drug theft and distribution, child pornography, planting evidence, corruption, and perverting the course of justice. Jonathan Rees and his partner Sid Fillery, a former police officer, were also under suspicion for the ax murder of a third private investigator. The Met undertook Operation Nigeria and tapped Rees' telephone. A large quantity of evidence was accumulated that Rees was purchasing information from improper sources and that Alex Marunchak of News of the World was paying as much as £150,000 a year for it. The operation was discontinued and Rees arrested when he was heard planning to plant false evidence to assist a client. He was convicted in 2000 and sent to prison for five years. Fillery was convicted for child pornography in 2003.

Instead of distancing themselves from the suspected murderers, News of the World editors began, in June 2002, surveillance on one of the Met police officers investigating the murder. Intended or not, this had the potential for undermining the murder investigation of News of the World sources. Fillery reportedly used his relationship with Alex Marunchak to arrange for private investigator Glenn Mulcaire, then doing work for News of the World, to obtain confidential information about Detective Chief Superintendent David Cook. This included his home address, his internal payroll number at the Metropolitan police, his date of birth and figures for the amount that he and his wife were paying for their mortgage. Surveillance of Cook is also reported to have involved physically following him and his young children. It included attempts to access his voicemail and that of his wife, and possibly attempts to send a "Trojan horse" email to try to steal information from his computer. Documents reportedly in the possession of the Scotland Yard shows that "Mulcaire did this on the instructions of Greg Miskiw, assistant editor at News of the World and a close friend of Marunchak." It also appeared that attempts had been made to open letters that had been left in Cook's external postbox. The Metropolitan Police Service handled this apparent attempt by agents of News of the World to interfere with a murder inquiry of the newspapers private investigators by having informal discussions with Rebekah Brooks, then editor for News of the World. "Scotland Yard took no further action, apparently reflecting the desire of Dick Fedorcio, Director of Public Affairs and Internal Communication for the Met who had a close working relationship with Brooks, to avoid unnecessary friction with the newspaper."

No one was charged with illegal acquisition of confidential information as a result of Operation Nigeria, even though the Met reportedly collected hundreds of thousands of incriminating documents during the investigations into Jonathan Rees over his links with corrupt officers." The Guardian's detailed expose of 2002 did not impel anyone at the Met or in public office to act. Upon Rees' release from prison in 2005, he immediately resumed his private investigative work of profitably supplying confidential information to News of the World, where Andy Coulson by that time had succeeded Rebekah Brooks as editor.

=== Operation Motorman ===
Many private investigators in addition to Rees were plying the lucrative trade in illegally acquired confidential information. John Boyall's speciality was acquiring information from confidential databases. His assistant was Glenn Mulcaire until the autumn of 2001, when News of the World's assistant editor, Greg Miskiw, attracted Mulcaire away by giving him a full-time contract to do work for the newspaper. Boyall eventually attracted the attention of the Information Commissioner's Office (ICO), an authority acting independently of the police in the public interest to uphold data privacy rights for individuals. The ICO raided Boyall's premises in November 2002. Documents seized there led the ICO to raid the premises of yet another private investigator, Steve Whittamore under Operation Motorman. Documents from this raid included "more than 13,000 requests for confidential information from newspapers and magazines." These established that confidential information was illegally acquired from telephone companies, the Driving & Vehicle Licensing Agency (DVLA) and the Police National Computer. "Media, especially newspapers, insurance companies and local authorities chasing council tax arrears all appear in the sales ledger" of the agency. Whittamore's network of information gatherers gave him access to confidential records at telephone companies, banks, post offices, hotels, theatres, and prisons, including BT Group, Crédit Lyonnais, Goldman Sachs, Hang Seng Bank, Glen Parva prison, and Stocken prison. Some 305 journalists working for at least 30 publications were found to be purchasing confidential information from private investigators.

The ICO issued reports in May 2006 and December 2006 titled "What price privacy?" and "What price privacy now?" However, much of the information obtained through Operation Motorman was not made public even after requests were made under the Freedom of Information Act. Although there was evidence of many people being engaged in illegal activity, relatively few were questioned. Operation Motorman's lead investigator said during a 2006 inquiry that "his team were told not to interview journalists involved. The investigator...accused authorities of being too 'frightened' to tackle journalists."

=== Operation Glade ===
Learning that Whittamore was obtaining information from the police national computer, the Information Commissioner contacted the Metropolitan Police. In response, the Met's anti-corruption unit initiated Operation Glade. Whittamore's detailed records identified 27 different journalists as commissioning his work, spending tens of thousands of pounds to acquire confidential information. Invoices submitted to News International, owner of News of the World, "sometimes made explicit reference to obtaining a target's details from their phone number or their vehicle registration." Between February 2004 and April 2005, the Crown Prosecution Service charged ten men working for private detective agencies with crimes relating to the illegal acquisition of confidential information. No journalists were charged. Whittamore, Boyall, and two others pleaded guilty in April 2005. According to ICO head Richard Thomas, "each pleaded guilty yet, despite the extent and the frequency of their admitted criminality, each was conditionally discharged [for two years], raising important questions for public policy."

== Royal household scandal (2005–2007) ==
During this period the spectre of inappropriate, unpopular invasion of privacy became broadly publicised. However, police officers, news media executives, the court took action that contained investigations and prevented the public from learning the true scope of the illegal activity.

=== Discovery of phone hacking ===
In November 2005, within months of the guilty pleas resulting from Operation Glade, the Metropolitan Police Service was notified of irregularities with the telephone voicemails of members of the royal household. By January 2006, Scotland Yard determined there was an "unambiguous trail" to Clive Goodman, the News of the World royal reporter, and to Glenn Mulcaire, a private investigator who was contracted to do work for the paper." The voicemail of one royal aide had been accessed 433 times.

The Met's counter-terrorism group, then led by assistant commissioner Andy Hayman, had responsibility for the security of the royal family. He was charged with making the investigation. There was concern about diverting resources to this effort because of the demands of other priorities, including following up on the 2005 London transit bombings and surveillance operations on possible bomb plotters.

On 8 August 2006, detectives from the Met went to News of the World with a search warrant to search Clive Goodman's desk. At the same time, police raided the home of Glenn Mulcaire and seized "11,000 pages of handwritten notes listing nearly 4,000 celebrities, politicians, sports stars, police officials and crime victims whose phones may have been hacked." The names included eight members of the royal family and their staff. There were dozens of notebooks, two computers containing 2,978 complete or partial mobile phone numbers and 91 PIN codes, and 30 tape recordings made by Mulcaire. Most significantly, there were at least three names of News of the World journalists in addition to Goodman, even though News International executives would later maintain Goodman was a single, "rogue reporter" involved in phone hacking. In the upper-left-hand corner of each document page was the name of the reporter or editor Mulcaire was helping. Also seized was a recording of Mulcaire instructing a journalist how to hack into private voice mail, particularly easy if the phone's factory settings for privacy had not been changed. All these documents went to Scotland Yard.

=== Containment of the investigation ===
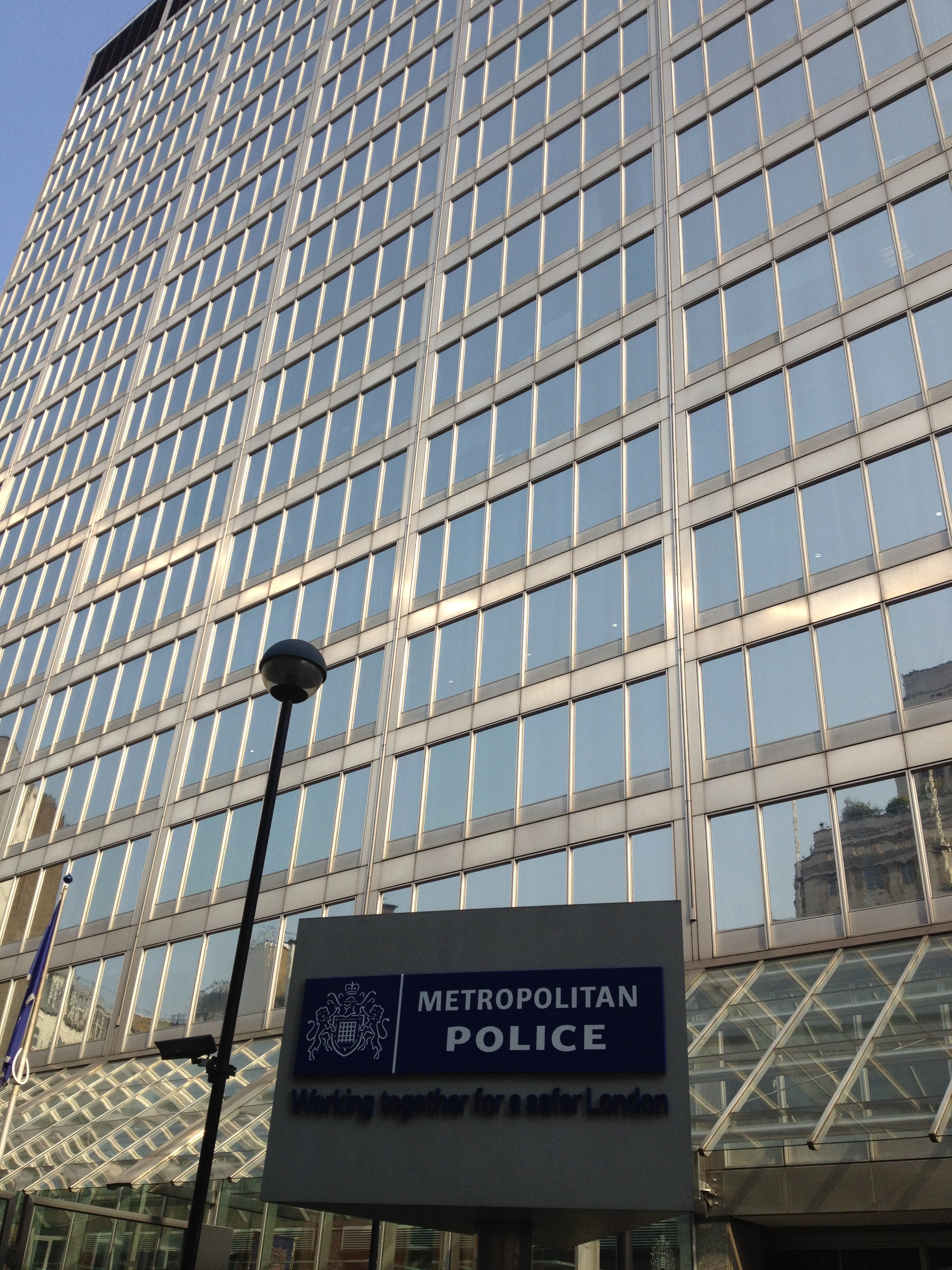
Investigations by the Metropolitan Police (Scotland Yard) in 2002 and 2006 were limited to just a few individuals, even though there was clear evidence of widespread phone hacking.

The seized documents also included a transcript of illegally accessed voice mail messages between Professional Football Association's Gordon Taylor and his legal adviser, Jo Anderson. This document was titled "Transcript for Neville" and is alleged to have been for Neville Thurlbeck, another reporter for News of the World. This email demonstrated that use of illegal interception of voice mail messages was being used at News of the World by more than just Clive Goodman. Met detectives did not then question Thurlbeck or any other News of the World journalist or any News International executives as part of their investigation. This failure to investigate may have been because of the Met's desire to maintain their comfortable relationship with the press. According to The New York Times:

Scotland Yard had a symbiotic relationship with News of the World. The police sometimes built high-profile cases out of the paper's exclusives, and News of the World reciprocated with fawning stories of arrests. Within days of the raids [on News of the World], several senior detectives said they began feeling internal pressure. One senior investigator said he was approached by Chris Webb, from the police department's press office, who was 'waving his arms up in the air, saying, 'Wait a minute – let's talk about this' [and]...stressed the department's long-term relationship with News International.

The Met's investigation under Hayman stayed narrowly focused on the victims in the royal household and a few other victims on a short "target list" seized by the Met during the Mulcaire raid. Hayman had seen but had not acted upon a longer list that was 8 to 10 pages in length, single-spaced, that "read like a British society directory." Only the five other victims that were included in the indictment of Mulcaire were notified about violation of privacy. Of the thousands of people who may also have been victims, the Met decided to notify only those that were members of the government, police, military, or otherwise of national-security concern. Not even all of these were notified. Politician George Galloway was notified by a detective on 24 August 2006 that his voicemail had been hacked and advised to change his PIN code to prevent re-occurrence. Galloway asked who had accessed his phone messages, but the detective refused to tell him.

Hayman's investigation also stayed narrowly focused on the activities of Goodman and Mulcaire. No News of the World executives or reporters other than Goodman were questioned about phone hacking until Operation Weeting was initiated more than four years later. Hayman enjoyed a comfortable relationship with the newspaper, having "attended four dinners, lunches and receptions with News of the World editors, including a dinner on April 25, 2006, while his officers were gathering evidence in the [Royal household phone hacking] case ... Mr. Hayman left the Metropolitan Police in December 2007 and was soon [afterward] hired to write a column for The Times of London", another publication owned and controlled by News International. These events later led to questions about whether Met officials having close relationships with news media organisations created inappropriate conflicts of interest.

Met officials consulted with the Crown Prosecution Service (CPS), headed by Director of Public Prosecutions (DPP) Ken Macdonald, about the best general way to proceed with the investigation and prosecution. The Met did not disclose all available evidence to senior CPS prosecutors at this time, reportedly omitting documents indicating that reporters in addition to Clive Goodman appeared to have been using Mulcaire's services. The CPS appears to have provided some rationale to the Met for limiting the investigation by initially advising that "phone hacking was only an offence if messages had been intercepted before they were listened to by the intended recipient." In fact, the hacking was illegal under the 1990 Computer Misuse Act regardless of whether messages had already been listened to by their intended recipient even if it was not illegal under the 2000 Regulation of Investigatory Powers Act. The precise nature of the guidance given by CPS to the Met became the subject of public disagreement between them 2011, at which time it was noted, among other things, that the charges brought against Goodman and Mulcaire included counts for which there was no mention or examination of whether messages had already been heard or not.

Goodman and Mulcaire were arrested in August 2006. In November they both pleaded guilty to conspiracy to intercept communications without lawful authority with respect to three of the royal aides. They both were sent to prison. Mr. Goodman later claimed that he was promised he "could come back to a job at the newspaper if I did not implicate the paper or any of its staff in my mitigation plea." He also later claimed that phone hacking was widely discussed at News of the World editorial meetings chaired by the editor, who at that time was Andy Coulson. In any event, after pleading guilty, being dismissed from News of the World, and contesting that dismissal, Mr. Goodman was paid a full year's salary, worth over £90,000, £140,000 in additional compensation, and £13,000 to cover legal expenses. Tom Watson, member of the House of Commons committee looking into the illegal access of voicemail, concluded "It's hush money. I think they tried to buy his silence." Mr. Mulcaire, following his guilty plea, received an £85,000 settlement and continued to receive financial support of £246,000 in legal fees from News International until shortly after James Murdoch was publicly questioned about it during a House of Commons hearing.

In short, the work of the Metropolitan police resulted in guilty pleas within 12-month of when the crimes against royal aides were committed. However, it was abundantly clear from court testimony and documents in the possession of the Metropolitan Police that Mulcaire had hacked at least five other phones and that he completed work assignments for more than just Goodman at News of the world. Mulcaire acknowledged hacking the phones of Sky Andrew, Max Clifford, Simon Hughes, Elle Macpherson, and Gordon Taylor in addition to members of the Royal household. These victims would all later bring suit against News of the World for invasion of privacy, some suits resulting in significant disclosures that would eventually lead to the collapse of the single "rogue reporter" stance maintained by News International.

Accordingly, within weeks of the arrests of Goodman and Mulcaire, a "senior police officer" reportedly advised Rebekah Brooks there was strong circumstantial evidence in the documents seized from Mulcaire that News of the World journalists in addition to Goodman were implicated in phone hacking. In early autumn 2006, Tom Crone, legal manager for News International, reportedly contacted several other executives, including then News of the World editor Andy Coulson, informing them of what the Met told Brooks. Coulson resigned, accepting responsibility for the illegal activity, but denied knowing about it. Nonetheless, senior newspaper executives including James Murdoch continued to maintain through early 2011 that the illegal activity was the sole work of this single "rogue reporter" and his private investigator.

The documents seized by the Met during the Mulcaire raid, including obvious evidence that many other people's phones had been hacked, remained largely unevaluated until the autumn of 2010. No one at News of the World other than Goodman was questioned by the Met until March 2011. Nonetheless, "senior Scotland Yard officials assured Parliament, judges, lawyers, potential hacking victims, the news media and the public that there was no evidence of widespread hacking by the tabloid." The New York Times reported that "the police agency and News International … became so intertwined that they wound up sharing the goal of containing the investigation.

== Period of denials (2007–2010) ==
During this period, evidence of phone hacking continued to come to the public's attention as a result of dogged investigative reporting, determined civil-suit plaintiffs, and related judicial rulings. Efforts to make the public broadly aware of the scope of illegal acquisition of confidential information were frustrated by denials by news media organisations and police officials.

=== Investigative reporting ===
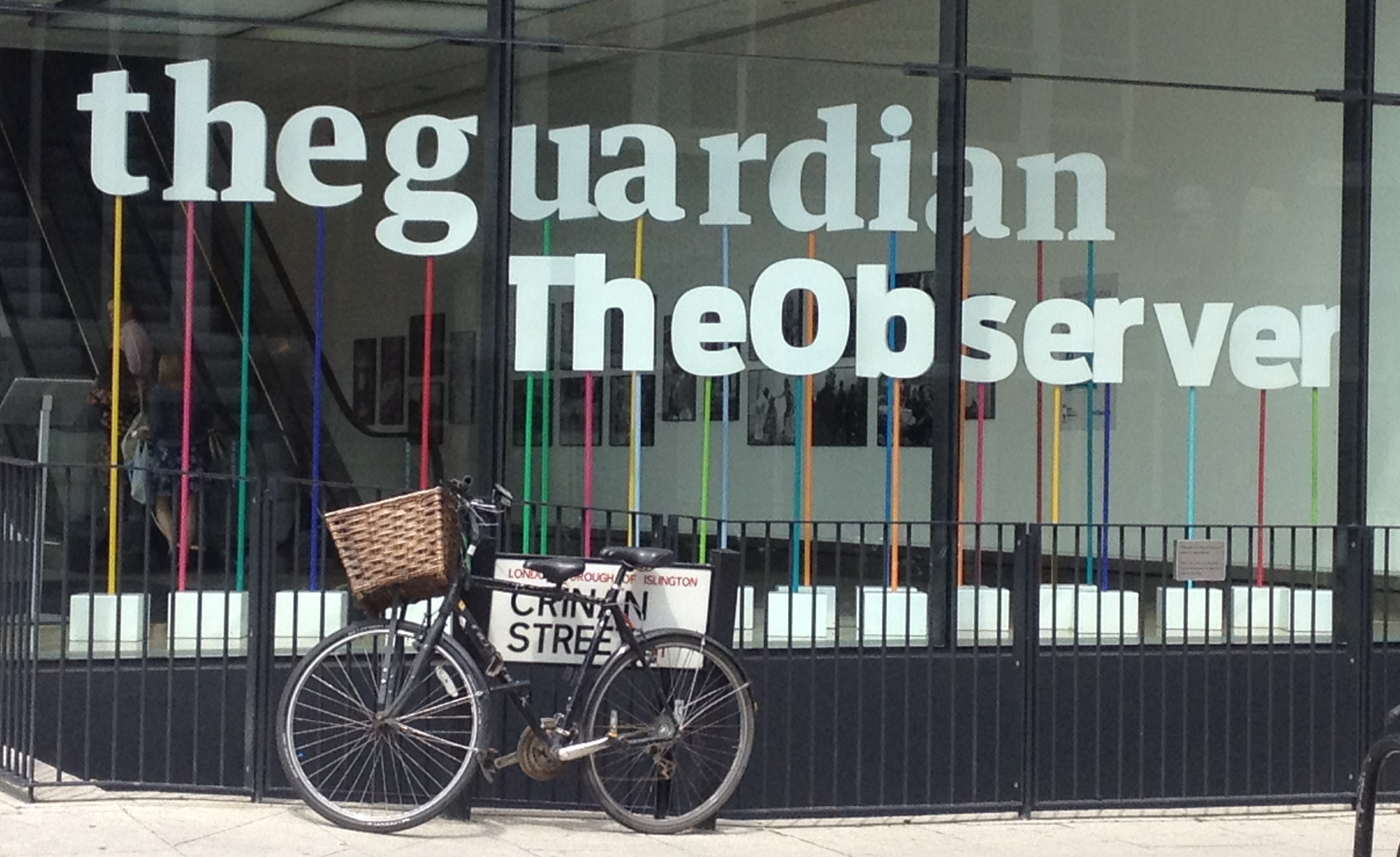
The Guardian newspaper began early and remained at the forefront of reporting on the phone hacking scandal.

As early as 2002, when the Metropolitan Police's anti-corruption unit was engaged in Operation Nigeria, The Guardian raised questions about whether all the evidence relating to police corruption was being pursued.

After the 2006 imprisonment of Clive Goodman and Glenn Mulcaire, and with assurances from News International executives and senior Metropolitan Police officials that a thorough investigation of evidence had identified only these two as being involved in phone hacking, the public perception was that the matter was closed. Nick Davies and other journalists from The Guardian continued to examine evidence available from court cases and reported information contradicting official positions. Other newspapers ultimately followed suit, obtaining and evaluating information from court records, Freedom of Information requests, and field contacts, reportedly including police officers.

While Scotland Yard and News International continued to insist that the practice of looking for news scoops by phone hacking was limited to a single "rogue reporter" and his private investigator, a small number of victims engaged solicitors and made civil claims for invasion of privacy. As information about settlements on these suits leaked out, The Guardian newspaper reported about it, calling public attention to considerable evidence that the practice was widespread. On 8 & 9 July 2009, the newspaper published three articles alleging that:

- Rupert Murdoch's News Group Newspapers (NGN) agreed to large settlements with hacking victims, including Gordon Taylor. The settlements included gagging provisions to prevent release to the public of evidence then held by the Metropolitan Police Service that NGN journalists repeatedly used criminal methods to get stories. "News Group then persuaded the court to seal the file on Taylor's case to prevent all public access, even though it contained prima facie evidence of criminal activity." That evidence included documents seized in raids by the Information Commissioner's Office and by the Met between 2002 and 2006.
- If the suppressed evidence became public, hundreds more phone hacking victims of News Group Newspapers (NGN), a subsidiary of News International, might be in a position to take legal action against NGN newspapers including News of the World and The Sun. It might also provoke police inquiries into reporters and senior newspaper executives.
- When Andy Coulson, then chief press adviser to Prime Minister David Cameron, was editor and deputy editor at News of the World, journalists there openly engaged private investigators that used illegal phone hacking, paying invoices for this work that itemised illegal acts.
- Everybody at News of the World knew what was going on, that there was no public interest defence for the phone hacking, and that the way investigations had been pursued raised serious questions about the Metropolitan Police, the Crown Prosecution Service, and the court which, "faced with evidence of conspiracy and systemic illegal actions,...agreed to seal the evidence." rather than make it know to the public.
- The Met held evidence that thousands of mobile phones had been hacked into by agents of News of the World. Victims included members of parliament from all three parties and including cabinet ministers.
- "The Metropolitan Police took the controversial decision not to inform the public figures whose phones had been targeted and the Crown Prosecution Service decided not to take News Group executives to court."
- Statements by executives misled a Parliamentary select committee, the Press Complaints Commission and the public about the extent of their newspaper's illegal acquisition of confidential information.

A chorus of denials followed.

=== Metropolitan Police/Scotland Yard ===
Later on the same day the Guardian articles were published, Metropolitan Police Service Commissioner Sir Paul Stephenson asked Assistant Commissioner John Yates to take a fresh look at the phone hacking to see if it should be reopened in the light of these allegations. Yates reportedly took just eight hours to consult with senior detectives and Crown Prosecution lawyers to conclude there was no fresh material that could lead to further convictions. His review did not include examination of possible leads from the thousands of pages of the available evidence seized in raids between 1999 and 2006.

In response to emerging evidence that illegal acquisition of confidential information was more widespread than had been acknowledged by news organisations and the police, Parliamentary committees held hearings. In September 2009, Yates maintained his position to the Commons Culture, Media and Sport Committee saying, "There remain now insufficient grounds or evidence to arrest or interview anyone else and...no additional evidence has come to light. Upon review of the first inquiry, he concluded that there were "hundreds, not thousands" of potential victims." Yates told the Committee, "It is very few, it is a handful" of persons that had been subject to message interception. Although Yates was aware of the "Transcript for Neville" email that clearly indicated more than a single rogue reporter was involved, he did not choose to interview Neville Thurlbeck about it. Further, Yates did not choose to interview other journalists at News of the World that Glenn Mulcaire may have worked with or to look into the cases of victims beyond the eight that were pursued in 2006. The Committee's findings, released in February 2010, were critical of the police for not pursuing "evidence that merited a wider investigation."

Mr. Yates returned the Committee 24 March 2011 and defended his prior representations that only 10 to 12 victims had been identified based upon the criteria given to police by the Crown Prosecution Service (CPS). The CPS denied that what they had told the Met could be reasonably used to limit the scope of Yates investigation. Further, they claimed to have been misled by the Met during consultations on how broadly to investigate during the Royal Household/Goodman inquiry. Met officials reportedly "didn't discuss certain evidence with senior prosecutors, including the notes suggesting the involvement of other reporters"

The Home Affairs Select Committee also questioned assistant commissioner Yates in 2009 about the Met's continuing decision not to reopen the investigation "following allegations that 27 other News International reporters had commissioned private investigators to carry out tasks, some of which might have been illegal." Mr. Yates responded that he had only looked into the facts of the original 2006 inquiry in Goodman. As information continued to emerge from court cases and investigative reporting, the Home Affairs Committee initiated another inquiry on 1 September 2010. The Committee again received evidence from the Met, newspaper journalists and executives, Like the House of Commons Committee, this House of Lord's Committee also published a report highly critical of the Met, stating in part, "The difficulties were offered to us as justifying a failure to investigate further, and we saw nothing that suggested there was a real will to tackle and overcome those obstacles." Member of Parliament Chris Bryant directly accused assistant commissioner Yates of misleading two parliamentary committees and of failing to correct itself to Parliament after errors in testimony became apparent to him.

The Guardian newspaper continued to be critical of Yates, who responded to these accusations by hiring a well known libel firm that threatened legal action against various media outlets for reporting that he had misled Parliament." Yates legal fees were reportedly paid by the Met. Eventually, as queries continued to come in from celebrities and politicians asking if they had been victims of hacking, Yates directed that the evidence from the Mulcaire raid that had been stored in garbage bags for three years be entered into a computer database. Ten people were assigned this task. Yates himself did not look at the evidence saying later, "I'm not going to go down and look at bin bags. I am supposed to be an Assistant Commissioner." He did not re-open the investigation.

=== Press Complaints Commission (PCC) ===
The UK Press Complaints Commission (PCC) is an industry organisation charged with self-regulation. After the conviction of Stephen Whittamore in 2005, the Information Commission, which is responsible for policing confidential databases, urged the Press Complaints Commission to issue "a clear public statement warning journalists and editors of the very real risks of committing criminal offences." Documents released under the Freedom of Information Act show that the PCC, which is funded by news media organisations, resisted doing this and finally produced guidance which the Information Commission publicly described as "disappointing".

The PCC's inquiry into phone hacking in 2007 concluded that phone message tapping should stop but that "there is a legitimate place for the use of subterfuge when there are grounds in the public interest to use it and it is not possible to obtain information through other means." News of the World editor Colin Myler told the PCC that Goodman's hacking was "aberrational", "a rogue exception," done by a single journalist. Sir Christopher Meyer, then chairman of the PCC, "promised to investigate 'the entire newspaper and magazine industry of the UK to establish what is their practice' but opted not to question Andy Coulson on the grounds that he had resigned, and not to question any other journalist or editorial executive on the paper, apart from Myler, who necessarily had no direct knowledge of what had been going on before his arrival. The PCC's subsequent report failed to uncover any evidence of any phone hacking by any media organisation beyond that revealed at Goodman's trial."

The PCC's inquiry in 2009 "was concerned with whether the PCC was misled by the News of the World during its 2007 investigation, and whether there was any evidence that phone message hacking has taken place since 2007." Its report concluded the PCC was not misled and that there was no evidence of ongoing phone hacking. This report and its conclusions were withdrawn on 6 July 2011, two days after The Guardian reported on the hacking of Milly Dowler's phone. The organisation's future was placed in doubt as a result of its failure to address the phone hacking scandal as it unfolded.

=== News Corporation ===
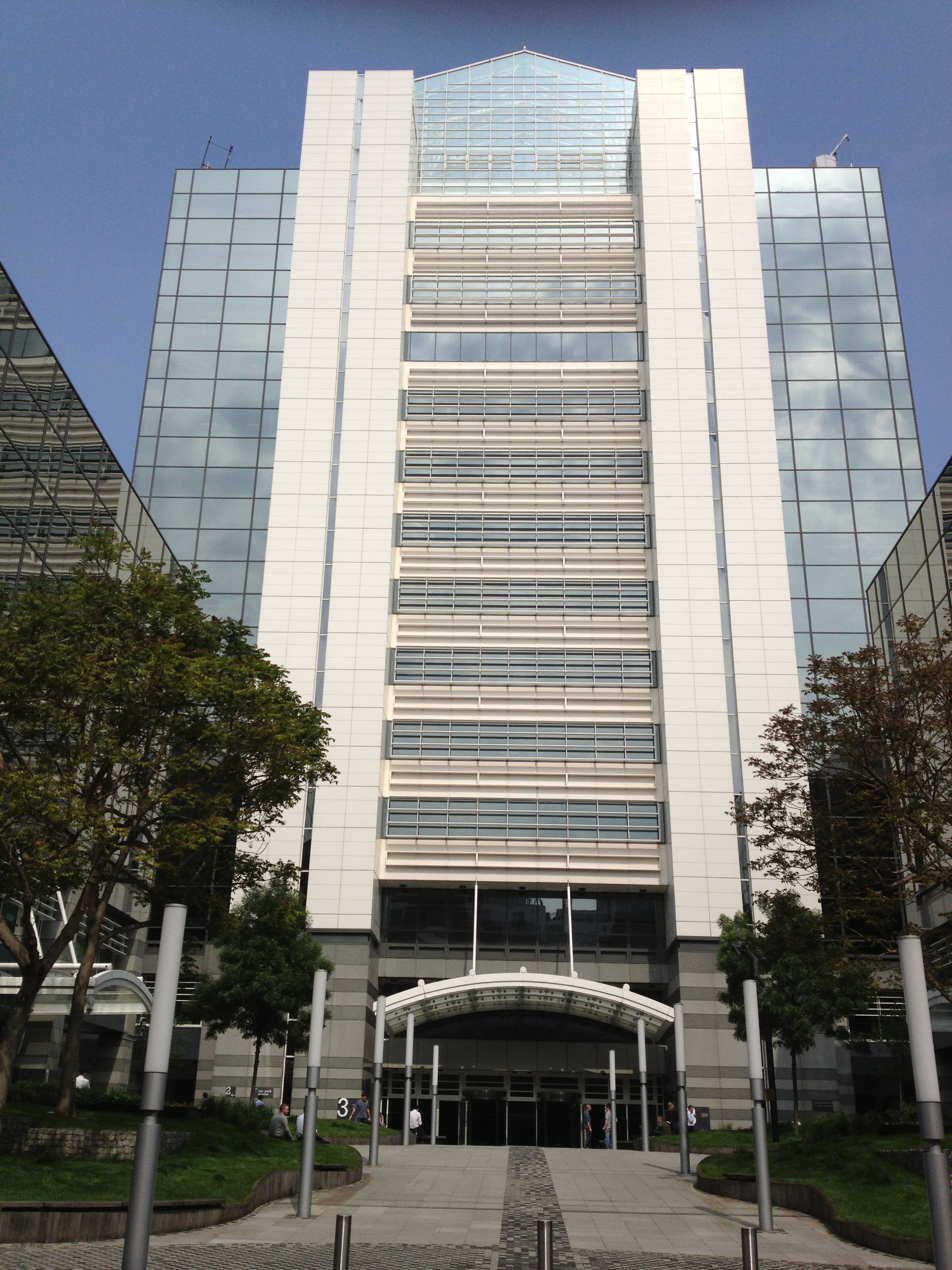
By mid-2012, formal charges had been filed against many News International journalists and executives, including former chief executive Rebekah Brooks.

The day in 2005 that the Met seized documents from Goodman and Mulcaire and arrested them for conspiracy to intercept communications without lawful authority, News of the World editors said they were stunned and vowed to conduct an internal investigation. According to Colin Myler's subsequent statement at the Commons Culture, Media and Sport Committee hearing, the firm of Burton Copeland was engaged in August 2005 "to absolutely oversee the investigation to cooperate with police...a very thorough investigation took place where there was a thorough review of everything from how cash payments were processed." Tom Crone testified that "Burton Copeland were in the office virtually every day...their remit was that they were brought in to go over everything and find out what had gone wrong, to liaise with the police ... They were given absolutely free-range to ask whatever they wanted to ask." Andy Coulson testified that "I brought in Burton Copeland ... to do an investigation. We opened up the files as much as we could. There was nothing they asked for that they were not given." However, no report was issued covering Burton Copeland's findings, and News International never waived privilege with respect to the law firm so that they could say for themselves what they had been able to do. Linklaters replaced Burton Copeland in representing News International in July 2011 and sent a letter to the Commons Culture, Media and Sport Committee in August 2011 stating "Burton Copeland did not conduct an investigation into phone hacking at the News of the World and their role was 'only about helping the police'... [but] Scotland Yard received 'very little material' from News International and Burton Copeland."

News International employees Jonathan Chapman and Daniel Cloke, respectively the heads of the legal and human resources departments, were asked to review a limited number of emails which were made available to them "through an electronic folder of emails assembled by News International's IT department". They were asked to determine whether the emails contained evidence that others at News International were aware of Clive Goodman's illegal activity or that others themselves were engaged in similar activity. Within this limited mandate, Chapman and Cloke found no such evidence. Chapman stated they were not "tasked with looking for evidence of any other potentially illegal activities." The names of the individuals who selected the emails that Chapman and Cloke reviewed and the criteria used to select them were never publicly disclosed.

Some of these emails were subsequently made available to Harbottle & Lewis for review. As with the Chapman and Cloke, News International strictly constrained the law firm's mandate to determine whether these emails contained evidence that others at News International were aware of Clive Goodman's illegal phone hacking activity or were themselves engaged in similar activity. This inquiry specifically did not include reviewing email traffic between Goodman and several other key senior reporters and editorial executives, current and former, at the News of the World, emails to and from Mulcaire, and staff interviews and a review of cash payments. It also did not ask the reviewers to consider whether there was other evidence of criminal activity, such as making payments to serving police officers. Within that limited mandate, Harbottle & Lewis could report that no evidence of phone hacking beyond that arranged by Goodman was found.

These limited and controlled investigations became the basis for News International's persistently maintaining that phone hacking was not widespread but instead the work of a single "rogue reporter" and his private investigator, namely Goodman and Mulcaire.

The House of Commons Culture, Media and Sport Committee held hearings regarding phone hacking by news media companies in March 2007, in July 2009, and again in July 2011. The 2007 inquiry regarding "Privacy and media intrusion" began shortly after Goodman and Mulcaire were sentenced. It was focused on activity at News of the World. On 6 March 2007, the then executive chairman of News International, Les Hinton, assured the Committee that a "full, rigorous internal inquiry" had been carried out and, to his knowledge, Goodman was the only person at News of the World that knew about hacking. Hinton said, "I believe absolutely that Andy Coulson did not have knowledge of what was going on." Asked whether Goodman was the only person who knew about the phone hacking, Hinton replied that he believed Goodman was.

In addition to Hinton, the Committee heard from Stuart Kuttner, managing editor of the News of the World, Tom Crone, legal manager of News International, Colin Myler, editor of News of the World, and Andy Coulson, former editor of News of the World. All of them stated there had been a thorough investigation of phone hacking and no evidence had ever been found that anyone besides Goodman and Mulcaire was involved.

Two years later, prompted by allegations in the three articles published by The Guardian in early July 2009, the Committee convened new hearings. Chairman John Whittingdale questioned whether the Committee had been misled by News International executives who testified two years before that Goodman and Mulcaire acted alone. The Committee again heard evidence from Les Hinton, by then chief executive officer of Dow Jones & Company, and Coulson, by then director of communications for the Conservative Party. They also heard from Met assistant commissioner John Yates and Detective chief superintendent Philip Williams. The Committee's findings, released in February 2010, were critical of News International executives for their "collective amnesia" and critical of the police for not pursuing "evidence that merited a wider investigation". Their report concluded that it was "inconceivable" that no one else, apart from Goodman, knew about the extent of phone hacking at the paper, and that the Committee had "repeatedly encountered an unwillingness to provide the detailed information that we sought, claims of ignorance or lack of recall and deliberate obfuscation".

=== Acknowledgements of hacking ===
While news media companies were vehemently denying that phone hacking was widespread, some of their current and former journalists who had first-hand knowledge were publicly acknowledging that it was.

In December 2010, The Guardian reported that more than 20 journalists who worked for News of the World had told The Guardian, The New York Times or Channel 4's Dispatches that "illegal activity assisted by private investigators was commonplace and well known to executives, including editor Andy Coulson."

It was evident from the 2005 convictions of Steve Whittamore, John Boyall, and others that illegal acquisition of confidential information for British news media organisations had been commonplace in the past. Guilty pleas by Clive Goodman and Glenn Mulcaire in 2007 confirmed the practice was ongoing. In 2007, Piers Morgan asserted that phone hacking was common practice. "Loads of newspaper journalists were doing it. Clive Goodman, the News of the World reporter, has been made the scapegoat for a widespread practice." Andrew Neil former editor of The Sunday Times and former writer for the Daily Mail claimed that phone hacking "was systemic throughout the News of the World, and to a lesser extent The Sun." Sharon Marshall former TV editor for News of the World and contributor to The Sun said hacking was industry wide. In 2010, Paul McMullan formally of News of the World, not only freely acknowledged that he and others hacked phones, but maintained that doing so was justified by the public interest. The New York Times reported that "a dozen former reporters said in interviews that hacking was pervasive at News of the World. "Everyone knew," one longtime reporter said. 'The office cat knew'...Andy Coulson talked freely with colleagues about the dark arts, including hacking. 'I've been to dozens if not hundreds of meetings with Andy' when the subject came up, said [a] former editor... When Coulson would ask where a story came from, editors would reply, 'We've pulled the phone records' or 'I've listened to the phone messages.'

=== Civil suits ===
In 2005, Mark Lewis, solicitor for the Professional Footballers' Association, suspected that News of the World hacked phones to get information for a proposed story concerning Gordon Taylor. His beliefs were confirmed late 2007 at Mulcaire's judicial proceedings, at which Mulcaire pleaded guilty and apologised to Taylor and seven others for accessing their voicemail messages. Lewis sued News of the World on behalf of Taylor, and filed actions with the court to obtain relevant documents. As a result, on 27 June 2008, the court ordered that documents held by the Metropolitan Police that had been obtained in the raids on Mulcaire and Steve Whittamore be turned over to Lewis. One of these documents was the "Transcript for Neville" email. This document, which had been in the Met's possession for several years, clearly indicated that News of the World journalists besides Clive Goodman had been involved in phone hacking. Public disclosure of this document would decisively contradict what News International executives had been maintaining since 2006 and open the door to hundreds if not thousands of additional lawsuits. Within 24 hours, News of the World began settlement discussions. Taylor ultimately received £700,000, and Lewis became the first solicitor to win a settlement from the newspaper for phone hacking. The amount of the settlement suggested more was at stake to News International than liability for phone hacking. The agreement included non-disclosure clauses that prevented release of information that would confirm more than one News of the World journalist was involved in illegally acquiring confidential information. This effectively prevented other potential litigants from learning that phone hacking was more widespread.

James Murdoch, then a senior executive at News International, later denied he had been aware of the "Transcript For Neville" email when he agreed to the generous settlement. He denied that he had reason to believe there was more than one reporter involved in phone hacking at News International's publications. He continued to maintain through late 2010 that the hacking at his newspaper was the work of a single reporter, Clive Goodman.

However, Tom Crone and Colin Myler, respectively the newspaper's legal advisor and editor, claimed they had met with James Murdoch and indicated to him the significance of the email, and it was this that resulted in agreement among them to make a large settlement payment to Taylor. Crone had received the email about 12 May 2008 and promptly discussed it with Myler. Julian Pike, a partner at Farrer & Co who represented the News Group Newspapers subsidiary of News International during the settlement negotiations claimed that he had informed News International of evidence suggesting "a powerful case" could be made that three News of the World journalists had illegally accessed confidential information. Pike also claimed that Colin Myler met with James Murdoch on 27 May 2008, after Pike had received a copy of the new evidence which had been emailed by Tom Crone to Myler. This meeting was in addition to Myler's subsequent meeting with Murdoch and Crone 10 June 2008. On 7 June 2008, Colin Myler sent an email to James Murdoch advising that the situation with the Gordon Taylor was "as bad as we feared." Included at the end of Myler's comments was an email to Myler from Crone that refers to a "nightmare scenario" and to the "Ross Hindley email," aka the "Transcript For Neville." Included at the end of this email was an email to Crone from Pike stating that Taylor wants to demonstrate that "what happened to him is/was rife throughout the organisation [and] to correct the paper telling Parliament inquiries that this was not happening when it was." Murdoch claimed he did not read the email in its entirety and therefore did not grasp the implications that more than one "rogue reporter" was involved in phone hacking at News of the World.

The settlement with Taylor remained secret until it was reported by The Guardian in early July 2009 in one of the three articles relating to phone hacking. Days later, Max Clifford, another of the eight victims named in the 2006 indictment of Mulcaire, announced his intentions to sue. In March 2010, News International agreed to settle his suit for £1,000,000, again a larger than expected settlement if only hacking Clifford's phone was the issue. These awards encouraged other possible victims and their solicitors to explore possibilities, resulting in more and more queries to the Metropolitan Police about whether their names were on Mulcaire's lists. Responses from the Met were difficult to obtain. Solicitor Charlotte Harris, who represented Clifford, wrote to the Metropolitan Police about other of her clients, Leslie Ash and her husband Lee Chapman, "asking whether they had also been hacked. The police took three months to reply."

George and Richard Rebh, owners of FLOORgraphics filed suit in 2006 against News Corp.'s US advertising subsidiary News America Marketing that, based upon forensic evidence, News America had engaged in illegal computer espionage against in 2006 by breaking into FLOORgraphics' password-protected computer system and obtaining proprietary information at least eleven times. It was alleged that this illegal acquisition of confidential business information was part of "a prolonged and concerted effort to destroy (FLOORgraphics)." The issue came to trial in 2009. A whistle-blower from News Corp. was prepared to give supporting testimony. Before his testimony was given, News America Marketing settled the case by purchasing FLOORgraphics from its owners for about $30 million. This settlement included a "non-disparagement" clause that effectively required the Rebhs to keep quiet about the case. The purchase price appeared excessive in contrast to FLOORgraphics' earnings at the time of about $1 million a year. A business law professor commented at the time that this price indicated how worried News Corp. was about the lawsuit and the substantial legal risk the suit presented to News Corp.

In spite of settlements that prohibited disclosure of illegal activity, information disclosed through judicial activity prompted other victims to pursue financial damages. One commentator observed that "the Goodman-Mulcaire revelations and subsequent prosecution were supposed to have settled the hacking matter forever and might have done just that, except that successful law suits... kept popping up against [News of the World] after the convictions.'

=== More investigative reporting ===
On 15 December 2011, The Guardian published an article authored by Nick Davies disclosing that documents, seized from the home of private investigator Glenn Mulcaire by Metropolitan Police Service in 2006 and only recently made available to the public by court action, implied that News of the World editor Ian Edmondson specifically instructed Mulcaire to intercept voice messages of Sienna Miller, Jude Law, and several others. The documents also implied that Mulcaire was engaged by others at News of the World, including chief reporter Neville Thurlbeck and assistant editor Greg Miskiw, who had then worked directly for editor Andy Coulson. This contradicted testimony to the Culture, Media and Sport Committee by newspaper executives and senior Met officials that Mulcaire acted on his own and that there was no evidence of hacking by other than him and a single "rogue reporter," namely Clive Goodman. Within five weeks of this article appearing, Ian Edmundson was suspended from News of the World, Andy Coulson resigned as Chief Press Secretary to David Cameron, the Crown Prosecution Service began a review of evidence it had, and the Met renewed its investigation into phone hacking, something it had declined to do since 2007.

== Renewed investigations (2011–2012) ==
During this period, revelations of unpopular invasions of privacy inflamed public opinion, leading to resignations of senior journalists, media executives and police officials and to reinvigorated investigations of wrongdoing.

=== Operations Weeting, Tuleta, and Elveden ===
The first renewed Met investigation was titled Operation Weeting and began in January 2011. It was focused on the illegal interception of voicemail . Between 45 and 60 officers began looking over the 11,000 pages of evidence seized from Mulcaire back in August 2006. By mid-year, five people were arrested, including senior journalists from News of the World.

In June 2011, the long-ignored issue of computer hacking was addressed by the launching of Operation Tuleta.

Having failed thus far to put the phone hacking issue to rest, News International's law firm, Hickman & Rose, now hired former Director of Public Prosecutions Ken Macdonald to review the emails that News International executives had used as the basis of their claim that no one at News of the World but Clive Goodman had been involved in phone hacking. Macdonald immediately concluded, regardless of whether others had been involved, that there was clear evidence of criminal activity, including payments to serving police officers. Macdonald arranged for this evidence to be turned over to the Met, which led to their opening in July 2011 Operation Elveden, an investigation focused on bribery and corruption within the Met's ranks.

On 4 July 2011, the phone hacking scandal broke wide upon with publication of The Guardian's article titled "Missing Milly Dowler's voicemail was hacked by News of the World" authored by Nick Davies and Amelia Hill. This article disclosed to the public for the first time that voicemail messages from Milly Dowler's phone had been hacked back in 2002 by an agent of News of the World. This disclosure inflamed public opinion and led to loss of advertising for News of the World and subsequent closure of this 168-year-old newspaper. The denials of widespread hacking made by media executives and senior law enforcements officers were no longer tenable. Within two weeks, senior News Corporation executives resigned, including Les Hinton, chief executive of Dow Jones & Company, Rebekah Brooks, chief executive of News International, Tom Crone, legal manager of News International, and Lawrence Jacobs, general counsel for News Corporation. Also within two weeks, the two top officials of the Metropolitan Police Service resigned, namely Commissioner Paul Stephenson and Assistant Commissioner John Yates.

The new Met Commissioner, Bernard Hogan-Howe, took the unusual step of asking a team from an outside police force, the Durham constabulary headed by Jon Stoddart, to review the work of Operation Weeting. By the end of the year, sixteen people, mostly editors and journalists who had at one time worked for News of the World, were arrested in conjunction with recently renewed investigations of illegal acquisition of confidential information. These included former editors Rebekah Brooks, and Andy Coulson. By the following September, the total number of arrests reached ninety and included many journalists from The Sun, another News International newspaper where Ms. Brooks had been editor.

In May 2012, the Crown Prosecution Service (CPS) charged six individuals with conspiring to pervert the course of justice by removing documents and computers to conceal them from investigating detectives. Charged were former News International CEO Rebekah Brooks, her husband, her personal assistant, her bodyguard, her chauffeur, and the head of security at News International. These charges were made about 1 year after the Metropolitan Police Service reopened its dormant investigation into phone hacking, about 3 years after the then Assistant Commissioner of the Metropolitan Police Service John Yates told the Commons Culture, Media and Sport Committee that "no additional evidence has come to light," 5 years after News International executives began claiming that phone hacking was the work of a single "rogue reporter, 10 years after The Guardian began reporting that the Met had evidence of widespread illegal acquisition of confidential information, and 13 years after the Met began accumulating "boxloads" of that evidence but kept it unexamined in trash bags at Scotland Yard.

On 24 July 2012, charges were brought against eight former employees or agents of News of the World including head editors Rebekah Brooks and Andy Coulson. All eight were charged regarding illegal interception of communications relating to specific individuals

=== Other inquiries launched ===
The furore over hacking of Milly Dowler's phone energised investigative bodies. Two days after The Guardian article was published, Prime Minister David Cameron announced the establishment of the Leveson Inquiry. In the following months, a dozen additional investigations were launched into illegal acquisition of confidential information in the UK, US, and Australia.

=== Additional civil suits ===
As of April 2011, there were at least 24 civil suits from celebrities and politicians filed for breach of privacy against News of the World alone. As of early October 2011, there were reportedly 63 civil suits directed at News International relating to the phone hacking scandal. Noting that there might be many more cases initiated over phone hacking, high court judge Mr Justice Vos selected test cases that "would enable him to decide the damages that were properly payable across a range of alleged factual situations, and make it possible for other cases to be resolved without the need for further hearings." He added that the trial would cover the issues of "what was agreed to be done, by whom, for what purpose, over what period and who was involved". This opened the door to full disclosure regarding phone hacking activity, and was in stark contrast to court action in 2006, when the court was persuaded by News International to seal records that contained evidence of criminal activity.

Nicola Phillps had been assistant to Max Clifford when her phone was hacked. Her suit against Glenn Mulcaire called for Mulcaire to disclose the name of the person who instructed him to intercept her phone messages. Mulcaire opposed this disclosure on the grounds that doing so might force him to incriminate himself. After a lengthy legal battle involving 20 months of appeals, the supreme court ordered him in July 2012 to disclose.

As of 25 September 2012, 292 suits against News International had been filed for alleged phone hacking. These were in addition to the 58 lawsuits settled previously and in addition to the 137 claims News International had accepted directly from victims without involving court proceeding. Justice Vos had set a deadline of 14 September for receiving claims. One suit that came in involved the husband of Justice Vos' niece. Another suit alleged illegal acquisition of information from a mobile phone as recently as 2010.

== Commercial consequences ==
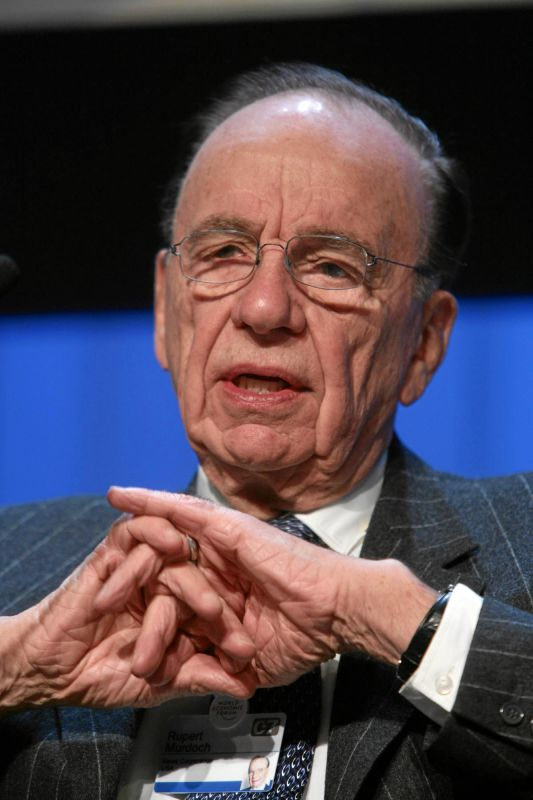
The Corporate Library, a research firm that grades companies' governance from A to F, gave Rupert Murdoch's News Corporation an F for the six years prior to the phone hacking scandal's breaking. News Corp. reportedly got an F "only because there is no lower grade."

In the months following The Guardian article regarding Milly Dowler, the fallout from the phone hacking scandal had many adverse commercial consequences for News Corporation.

News of the World was shut down after 168 years in business and News Corp. withdrew its $12 billion bid for British Sky Broadcasting Group plc (BSkyB), reportedly the biggest reverse of Rupert Murdoch's career. News Corp. lost its contract bid with the NY State Comptroller over concerns about the phone-hacking scandal. The legal bills and settlement of suits cost News Corp. hundreds of millions of dollars.

Rupert Murdoch endorsed Chase Carey as a future chief executive for News Corp. rather than his son James Murdoch, who had been viewed as the favourite to succeed Rupert. James resigned as Chairman of British Sky Broadcasting Group (BSkyB), distancing the company from the scandal at News International. James was harshly criticised by the British Office of Communications (Ofcom), which concluded that he "repeatedly fell short of the conduct to be expected of as a chief executive and chairman" and that his lack of action in relation to phone hacking was "difficult to comprehend and ill-judged". Rupert himself was found to be "not a fit person to exercise the stewardship of major international company" by the Commons Culture, Media and Sport Committee.

Eighteen major shareholders of News Corp. advised Rupert they planned to vote against him as chairman at the upcoming annual meeting of the company. Several large investors in News Corporation filed suit against members of the company's board of directorsfor alleged misconduct including "allowing Murdoch to use News Corp as his own personal fiefdom." The complaint cited the phone hacking scandal at News of the World and tactics used by News America Marketing and NDS Group Plc that may have included "stealing computer technology, hacking into business plans and computers and violating the law through a wide range of anti-competitive behaviour". The stockholders allege "failed corporate governance and domination by a controlling shareholder" who misused company resources to gain political power, and that directors "condoned Murdoch's use of News Corp to pursue his quest for power, control, and political gain" at shareholder expense. Further, "the investors allege that board members refused to initiate a proper investigation for fear of angering Rupert Murdoch and his son, James."

Citizens for Responsibility and Ethics in Washington (CREW) asked the Federal Communications Commission (FCC) to revoke the 27 Fox broadcast licenses News Corp. holds, claiming significant character deficiencies warranted disqualification since "the House of Commons report makes clear that both Rupert and James Murdoch were complicit in New Corp.'s illegal activities."

The Church of England sold its £1.9m stake in News Corp. "Board-level dialogue" did not satisfy the Church that the company "had shown, or is likely in the immediate future to show, a commitment to implement necessary corporate governance reform." A year earlier, the Church's Ethical Investment Advisory Group criticised "reprehensible and unethical" conduct and stated "We cannot imagine circumstances in which we would be satisfied with any outcome that does not hold senior executives to account at News Corporation for the gross failures of management at the News of the World."

John Dean, who as White House Counsel to US President Richard Nixon helped orchestrate the Watergate coverup, observed:

The unfolding scandal that is currently hammering the reputation and value of News Corp. so closely parallels the sequence of events that provoked my warning to Nixon ... Just as Nixon did not undertake the initiating illegality himself (the bugging of the Democratic National Committee headquarters), nor did Murdoch personally undertake the illegal hacking of voice mails. Rather, both men created norms and standards within their respective organisations where such conduct was not only considered acceptable, but actually encouraged.

== Status of arrests, charges, and convictions ==
In the UK, over 100 people have been arrested and many of these people charged with crimes relating to the illegal acquisition of confidential information. All but ten of these were arrested or rearrested since the Metropolitan Police Service renewed investigations in 2011. Deputy assistant commissioner Sue Akers, who became responsible for the Met's investigations in 2011, expressed the view in 2012 that the investigations and related prosecutions could take three more years. As she spoke, there were 185 Met officers and civilian staff working on the Operations Weeting, Elveden and Tuleta.

The following table lists in alphabetical order the named individuals arrested since 1999 in conjunction with alleged illegal acquisition and trafficking of confidential information. It shows the dates each was arrested and indicates the status of each individual's case, along with dates for formal charges made, convictions, and other outcomes, as applicable. All arrests in conjunction with the phone hacking scandal were made in the UK. Chronological lists of arrests, charges and convictions, including more details about them, are included with the phone hacking scandal reference lists.

Person	Allegations	Position	Date arrested	Date if Charged	Date if Convicted	Other Date	Notes	Refs
Bird, Bob	phone hacking and perjury	former Scotland editor for News of the World	29 August 2012	29 August 2012				
Boyall, John	violation of Data Protection Act	private investigator	2004	2004	2005	n/a	pleaded guilty to breaching the Data Protection Act	
Box-Turnbull, Greg	conspiracy, bribery	journalist for the Trinity Mirror	4 July 2012					
Brooks, Charles	perverting the course of justice	racehorse trainer, former columnist for The Daily Telegraph	13 March 2012	15 May 2012			Trial date 9 September 2013	
Brooks, Rebekah	conspiring to intercept communications and corruption	chief executive News International	17 July 2011	24 July 2012			Trial date 9 September 2013	
Brooks, Rebekah	perverting the course of justice	chief executive News International	13 March 2012	15 May 2012			Trial date 9 September 2013	
Carter, Cheryl	phone hacking and perverting the course of justice	personal assistant to Rebekah Brooks	6 January 2012	15 May 2012			Trial date 9 September 2013	
Casburn, April	misconduct in public office	Met detective chief inspector		24 September 2012				
Coles, John	conspiracy to corrupt	journalist for The Sun	9 September 2012					
Cook, Dave	misconduct in a public office and violations of the Data Protection Act	Met Detective Chief Superintendent	10 January 2012					
Coulson, Andy	conspiracy to intercept communications	editor	8 July 2011	24 July 2012			Trial date 9 September 2013	
Coulson, Andy	perjury	editor News of the World	30 May 2012	30 May 2012				
Craig, David	intercepting messages	editor Weekly News	Aug 2006	n/a	n/a	n/a	not charged	
Crone, Tom	conspiracy to intercept communications	legal manager at News International	30 August 2012					
Dawse, Christoper	violation of data protection act	private investigator	2005	22 April 2005	n/a	n/a		
Desborough, James	conspiracy to intercept communications	US Hollywood editor News of the World	18 August 2011					
Dudman, Graham	corruption and conspiracy	managing editor of The Sun	28 January 2012					
Edmondson, Ian	unlawful interception		5 April 2011	24 July 2012			Trial date 9 September 2013	
Edwards, John	corruption and conspiracy	picture editor of The Sun	11 February 2012					
Edwards, Paul	pervert course of justice	chauffeur to Rebekah Brooks	13 March 2012	15 May 2012			Trial date 9 September 2013	
Elston, Laura	phone hacking	Press Asso royal corresp	27 June 2011	n/a	n/a	7 September 2012	faces no further action	
Evans, Dan	phone hacking	reporter News of the World	19 August 2011					
Farmer, Con	bribery & conspiracy		1999	1999	n/a	2000	acquitted by directed verdict	
Foster, Patrick	computer hacking and perverting course of justice	former journalist for The Times	29 August 2012					
Freeman, Graham	computer hacking	founder of a security consultancy	24 February 2012					
Goodman, Clive	intercepting messages	royal reporter for News of the World	8 August 2006	2006	29 November 2006	n/a	pleaded guilty to conspiracy to intercept communications without lawful authority	
Goodman, Clive	obstruction of justice	royal reporter for News of the World	8 July 2011					
Gunning, John	violation of Data Protection Act	private investigor	2005	22 April 2005	2005	n/a	convicted of acquiring private subscriber information from British Telecom's database	
Ross Hall aka Ross Hindley	conspiracy to intercept voicemail and perverting the course of justice	reporter News of the World	2 September 2011	n/a	n/a	24 July 2012	insufficient evidence	
Hanna, Mark	conspiracy to pervert the course of justice	head of security for News International		15 May 2012			Trial date 9 September 2013	
Hartley, Clodagh	bribery, corruption and conspiracy	journalist for The Sun	25 May 2012					
Hayes, Steve	computer hacking	Owner of rugby and football clubs	24 February 2012					
Hunter, Keith	corruption	former MPS detective, current chief executive of a private investigation firm	23 May 2012					
Jones, Paul aka Taff Jones			2005	22 April 2005	n/a	n/a		
Jorsling, Daryl	conspiracy to pervert the course of justice	security consultant for News International	13 March 2012	15 May 2012			Trial date 9 September 2013	
Kay, John	corruption and conspiracy	chief reporter of The Sun	11 February 2012					
King, Alan	violation of Data Protection Act	private investigator	2004	2004	15 April 2005	n/a	pleaded guilty to breaching the Data Protection Act	
Kuttner, Stuart	conspiring to intercept communications and corruption	managing editor News of the World	2 August 2011	24 July 2012			Trial date 9 September 2013	
Larcombe, Duncan	corruption and conspiracy	royal editor of The Sun	19 April 2012					
Lyle, Andrew	violation of Data Protection Act		2005	22 April 2005	n/a			
Marunchak, Alex	computer hacking	journalist News of the World	2 October 2012					
Marshall, Paul			2004	2004	15 April 2005	n/a	pleaded guilty to conspiracy to commit misconduct in a public office	
Maskell, Mark	violation of Data Protection Act		2005	22 April 2005	n/a			
Miskiw, Greg	interception and conspiring to intercept communications	news editor News of the World	10 August 2011	24 July 2012			Trial date 9 September 2013	
Mulcaire, Glenn	phone hacking	private investigator	8 August 2006	29 November 2006	2006	n/a	pleaded guilty to conspiracy to intercept communications without lawful authority and to unlawful interception of communications	
Mulcaire, Glenn	pervert the course of justice	private investigator	7 December 2011	24 July 2012			Trial date 9 September 2013	
Panton, Lucy	payments to police officers	crime editor of News of the World	15 December 2011					
Parker, Nick	corruption and conspiracy	chief foreign correspondent for The Sun	11 February 2012					
Parker, Nick	gathering of data from stolen mobile phones	chief foreign correspondent for The Sun	30 July 2012					
Penrose, Justin	conspiracy and corruption	journalist at The Daily Mirror	11 July 2012					
Pharo, Chris	corruption and conspiracy	news desk executive of The Sun	28 January 2012					
Phillips, Rhodri	handling stolen goods	journalist for The Sun	19 July 2012					
Pyatt, Jamie	corruption	district editor of The Sun	4 November 2011					
Sandell, Lee	perverting the course of justice	security guard at News International	5 July 2012	12 September 2012			Trial date 9 September 2013	
Savage, Tom	conspiracy and corruption	deputy news editor of Daily Star Sunday	11 July 2012					
Shanahan, Fergus	corruption and conspiracy	executive editor of The Sun	28 January 2012					
Simons, Raoul	conspiracy to intercept voicemail	deputy football editor of The Times	7 September 2011	n/a	n/a	24 July 2012	insufficient evidence	
Rees, Jonathan	computer hacking	private investigator	2 October 2012					
Sturgis, John	corruption and conspiracy	deputy news editor of The Sun	11 February 2012					
Sullivan, Mike	corruption and conspiracy	crime editor of The Sun	28 January 2012					
Taras, Terenia	conspiring to intercept communications	free lance contributor to News of the World	23 June 2011	n/a	n/a		insufficient evidence	
Thurlbeck, Neville	bribery & conspiracy	News of the World	1999	1999	n/a	2000	acquitted by directed verdict	
Thurlbeck, Neville	phone hacking & conspiracy	News of the World	5 April 2011	24 July 2012			Trial date 9 September 2013	
Usher, Bethany	intercepting voicemail	journalist for News of the World	30 November 2011	n/a	n/a	30 November 2011	cleared and released	
Wallis, Neil	conspiring to intercept communications	executive director News of the World	14 July 2011					
Weatherup, James	intercepting communications	asst news editor News of the World	14 April 2011	24 July 2012			Trial date 9 September 2013	
Webster, Geoff	corruption and conspiracy	deputy editor of The Sun	11 February 2012					
Wheeler, Virginia	corruption	defence correspondent for The Sun	1 March 2012					
Whittamore, Steve	violation of Data Protection Act	private investigator	2004	22 April 2005	2005	n/a	pleaded guilty to breaching the Data Protection Act	
Wight, Douglas	phone hacking and perjury	news editor for News of the World in Scotland	17 August 2012	16 August 2012				
Unnamed Individuals			31 people					
Totals			104 people	26 people	7 people		As of 23 October 2012	

Notes:

Totals are adjusted for multiple arrests, charges, etc.
n/a = not applicable

== Issues for consideration ==
Even as scope of the scandal was unfolding, proposals were being debated in legislatures and in the press about whether regulatory remedies were warranted. Two days after The Guardian article regarding Milly Dowler was published, Prime Minister David Cameron announced that a public government inquiry would be initiated. Cameron named Lord Justice Leveson to chair the inquiry that would look into phone hacking at News of the World and other newspapers, the diligence of the initial police inquiry, alleged illegal payments to police by the press, and the general culture and ethics of the media, including broadcasters and social media. Some of the issues the Leveson Inquiry and other investigative bodies would address are listed below.

=== Performance of the Metropolitan Police Service ===
The Met received severe criticism for its role in the phone hacking scandal. Commentators observed that the personal relationships among individuals variously in law enforcement, news media, and political institutions may have compromised principles and judgments, sometimes leading to inappropriate favours or even illegal payments. Expectations by Met officers of later employment by news organisations may also have compromised relationships. This entanglement of personal and commercial interests led some commentators to believe that a disincentive was created for police officials to thoroughly investigate allegations of wrongdoing. This may have resulted in the failure to notify victims in a timely manner, led to misleading statements to the public and government oversight bodies to cover-up wrongdoing, and/or led to attempts to stifle the voices of whistle-blowers.

The Met also came under criticism for ignoring enormous amounts of evidence and for anaemic investigations until public disclosure of it forced them to do so.

=== Performance of News International ===
Initial investigations by News International had limited objectives and involved pre-screened evidence. Outside solicitors were used as the basis for issuing flawed reports with which to bolster the company's bogus "rogue reporter" claims with which News Corp. executives reassured Parliament. Ultimately the company acknowledged to the Leveson Inquiry that News International executives had destroyed evidence and covered up the truth.

=== Performance of political leadership ===
Political parties apparent dependence upon endorsement by news organisations for election may have led leaders to turn a blind eye to how newspapers acquired their information. Andy Coulson was editor of News of the World when Clive Goodman was convicted of hacking Royal household mobile phones. Shortly after he resigned, maintaining he know nothing of wrongdoing but accepting responsibility for what happened on his watch, he was hired by the Conservative Party as their director of communications and later became Prime Minister David Cameron's highest paid advisor. Judgments regarding Rupert and James Murdoch's character by a Parliamentary Committee were made along party lines.

=== Media coverage of the scandal ===
With the behaviour of news media organisations at the centre of the scandal, questions were raised as to whether media coverage was stifled by ownership interests. Initial reaction by The Wall Street Journal, owned by News Corp, was to serve as a platform for owner Rupert Murdoch's response. A commentator at Fox, also owned by News Corp, said "I'm not going to touch it." Other industry commentators noted that the amount, aggressiveness, and focus of early media coverage of the scandal by news organisations varied widely, possibly reflecting the tension between journalistic integrity and the vested interests of the ultimate owners of those organisations.

The scandal generated broad interest worldwide shortly after The Guardian reported in July 2011 that murdered teenager Milly Dower's phone had been hacked into by agents of News of the World and after Rupert Murdoch announced that the 168-year-old newspaper would be closed as a consequence. Samples of media coverage appearing immediately after The Guardian article about Milly Dowler's phone are included with the phone hacking scandal reference lists.

=== Self-regulation of the press ===
The UK Press Complaints Commission (PCC) failed to question any journalists or editorial executives after Clive Goodman was convicted, choosing to accept Andy Coulson's assertion that the hacking was "aberrational, "a rogue exception," done by a single journalist. Its investigation of phone hacking concluded there was no evidence of phone hacking beyond what had already been reported. This report and its conclusions were ultimately withdrawn.

=== Public interest defence ===
Some attempts were made to justify illegal acquisition of confidential information on the basis that there was a public interest in revealing dishonesty on the part of the individuals whose phones or computers were hacked. However, distinctions were made between what was in the public interest and what was simply interesting to the public. Amelia Hill, whose journalist activity helped disclose the hacking of Milly Dowler's phone, was not prosecuted while journalists who hacked celebrities claiming it was in the public interest to reveal hypocrisy on their part, were prosecuted.

=== Targeting opponents for surveillance ===
During the course of various investigations into News International and their agents, the company used its own employees and hired private detectives to conduct surveillance beyond simple phone hacking on a serving police officer investigating agents of News of the World, two solicitors representing victims suing News International, and a member of parliament who had been critical of the company while serving on a Committee investigating it. This surveillance reportedly included following and videotaping the target and members of his family, including young children. It also may have included phone hacking, computer hacking, going through trash, and opening mail.

Some of this surveillance was proposed by solicitors representing News International for the apparent purpose of discrediting individuals opposing the company. The solicitor involved continued to characterise this surveillance as "unusual" but "justified" and "would do it again tomorrow", even after News International acknowledged that it was "deeply inappropriate".

== Timelines ==
Links to timelines related to the news media phone hacking scandal are included with the phone hacking scandal reference lists

== See also ==
As it became apparent that the wrongdoing was more widespread than initially perceived, the scope of Wikipedia articles relating to the phone hacking scandal expanded from coverage of News of the World to News International to News Corporation and finally to all news media organisations involved in the illegal acquisition of confidential information. Earlier articles with additional details on the scandal as it unfolded include:

News of the World royal phone hacking scandal
News of the World phone hacking scandal investigations
News International phone hacking scandal
News Corporation scandal
Amdocs, Israeli phone software company claiming 80% of market share
