= 2011 News Corporation scandals =

Phone hacking scandals in 2011

In mid-2011, out of a series of investigations following up the News of the World royal phone hacking scandal of 2005–2007, a series of related scandals developed surrounding other News Corporation properties—where initially the scandal appeared contained to a single journalist at the News of the World (with the 2007 jailing of Clive Goodman and the resignation of then-editor Andy Coulson), investigations eventually revealed a much wider pattern of wrongdoing. This led to the closure of the News of the World on 10 July 2011, an apology by Rupert Murdoch in an advertisement in most British national newspapers, and the withdrawing of News Corporation's bid to take over the majority of BSkyB shares it did not own.

Investigations continued into what the company and individuals at the company knew of the phone hacking and when, as well as into other issues, including questions around police bribery. Since police renewed investigations in 2011, 90 people have been arrested and 16 charged with crimes in conjunction with illegal acquisition of confidential information, many if not most of them employees or agents of News Corp.

== United Kingdom ==
=== Police corruption ===
In a September 2010 interview broadcast on 7 July 2011, on the BBC Radio 4 news programme The World at One, former News of the World features editor Paul McMullan made an admission relating to police corruption. He told of having used material obtained by a colleague's bribery of a police officer as the basis of a series of articles published over several years on Jennifer Elliott, the daughter of the actor Denholm Elliott. He stated, 'The going rate for that kind of thing might have been two to five hundred pounds and that would have been authorised, and he [i.e. the police officer] would have been paid... and he would have been on the lookout for another story...' The articles described Ms Elliott's destitute situation and stated that she had worked as a prostitute. Jennifer Elliott killed herself in 2003. In Mr McMullan's opinion the News of the World – specifically, his own articles – contributed significantly to her suicide. In 2011, the paper knowingly used private investigators to gain stories from corrupt police officers.

=== Operation Elveden ===
In July 2011, the Metropolitan Police launched Operation Elveden, a probe examining illicit payments to police officers.

On 11 February 2012, the BBC reported that a number of people, including five Sun employees, were arrested by police regarding allegations of corrupt payments to police and public officials. On 20 November 2012, it was reported that several individuals were to be charged with conspiring to commit misconduct in public office—former CEO Rebekah Brooks, Andy Coulson, Clive Goodman, and Bettina Jordan-Barber.

== United States ==
News Corporation owns a multitude of news outlets in the United States, including the New York Post, The Wall Street Journal, and the Fox News Channel. Several media critics have called for investigations into whether they too engaged in phone hacking activities. In addition to any possible illegal activities in the U.S., News Corporation and/or its executives might also face civil and criminal liability under the Foreign Corrupt Practices Act.

On 24 February 2011, The New York Times reported that court documents in another, unconnected case revealed that the senior executive at News Corporation that Judith Regan referred to in her 2007 wrongful termination case against HarperCollins was Roger Ailes, the chairman of Fox News. Regan claimed that Ailes had previously encouraged her to lie to federal investigators who were vetting Bernard B. Kerik, who had been nominated for Secretary of Homeland Security by President George W. Bush. Ailes allegedly gave the orders to protect his close friend, Rudy Giuliani, who was running for president at the time. HarperCollins settled their case for $10.75 million.

According to a former New York City police officer who spoke to The Mirror in 2009, the News of the World also attempted to retrieve private phone records of victims of the 11 September attacks. In light of the suspected hacking, Senate Commerce Committee chairman Jay Rockefeller suggested that a U.S. investigation of News Corporation should be launched. On 14 July, the Federal Bureau of Investigation announced it was launching an investigation into alleged hacking by News Corporation.

New investigations might also consider issues which had been raised in the past. In 2008, Dan Cooper, one of the co-founders of Fox News, alleged that network president Roger Ailes had threatened to ruin his long-time agent's business if Cooper wasn't dropped as a client. This followed an interview Cooper had given to David Brock for New York magazine shortly after his Fox contract ended in June 1997. Cooper concluded that Ailes had pre-publication knowledge of his interview with Brock, believing that he had accessed Brock's phone records through Fox News' "Brain Room", which he claimed "housed a counterintelligence and black ops office." Fox News denied Cooper's allegations.

On 20 July 2011, US Senator Frank Lautenberg wrote a letter to the Department of Justice requesting that the ongoing FBI probe include allegations that Floorgraphics had also been hacked by News America Marketing, a major marketing business owned by News Corporation. On 21 July, it was reported that representatives of the US Dept. of Justice and the FBI had begun investigation into the Floorgraphics allegations.

News Corp is also being investigated over claims that senior executives misled investors in 2011, causing the company's stock to be traded at an artificially high price. A US class action has been filed for investors who purchased News Corporation common stock between 3 March 2011, and 11 July 2011.

On 11 July 2011, a group of shareholders led by Amalgamated Bank who were already suing News Corps over the purchase of Rupert Murdoch's daughter's media company, Shine Group, updated the lawsuit to include accusations that the board of News Corp "fail[ed] to exercise proper oversight and take sufficient action since news of the hacking first surfaced at its subsidiary nearly six years ago." On 13 September they added further charges concerning the Floorgraphics case and the behaviour of another of News Corps subsidiary companies, NDS Group. The shareholders' attorney said that the phone hacking which took place in the UK was "part of a much broader, historic pattern of corruption at News Corp., under the acquiescence of a board that was fully aware of the wrongdoing, if not directly complicit in the actions." News Corp has yet to issue a statement on the new allegations.

In November 2012, it was reported that agents of News Corp had illegally bribed a member of the US military to obtain a photograph of an imprisoned Saddam Hussein wearing only his underwear. The photo was subsequently published in a News Corp outlet. Bribing public officials is a violation of the US's Foreign corrupt practices act.

== Australia ==
In light of News Corporation's global review, John Hartigan, the boss of News Corp's Australian company News Limited, announced a review of all payments in the previous three years, and that he was personally willing to co-operate with any Australian Government-led inquiry. On 22 July, it was reported that two former Victorian Supreme Court judges, Frank Vincent and Bernard Teague, would act as independent assessors of how the review is run and would also assess its outcome.

In a recent action of wrongful dismissal by the editor in chief of the highest read daily newspaper against The Herald Sun newspaper, published by a subsidiary of the defendant, News Limited, accusations about the reliability of Mr Hartigan as a witness under oath have been made. During the period relevant to the proceedings, Mr John Hartigan was the chairman, and chief executive officer, of News Limited. Justice J Kaye deliberated in his 2010 findings against him in his role as boss of NewsCorp. Specifically Justice Kaye found Hartigan's evidence to be unreliable. Justice Kaye further commented that "were aspects about his evidence, which lead him to be cautious about accepting a number of critical features of it."

The Australian Greens called for a parliamentary inquiry into News Limited, but Hartigan directly denied allegations by both the Greens and the governing Labor party that News Limited has been running a campaign against them, describing his group's journalism as "aggressive but fair."

The administration of Prime Minister Julia Gillard stalled a ruling by an independent panel for Sky's bid to run the Australia Network, imposing a "national interest" bar on the process. After the Murdochs had appeared in front of the UK Culture, Media and Sport Committee on 19 July, Gillard commented that: "When people have seen telephones hacked into, when people have seen individuals grieving having to deal with all of this, then I do think that causes them to ask some questions here in our country."

On 13 September 2011, the government announced an inquiry into the country's media. Areas of scrutiny include the protection of privacy and the role of the Australian Press Council.

On 21 September 2011, documents were leaked to the news website Crikey detailing a proposed rebranding of News Limited as News Australia.

In 2012 following a BBC Panorama report, allegations were made that News Corp subsidiary, News Datacom Systems (NDS) had used hackers to undermine pay TV rivals in Australia and elsewhere. Some of the victims of the alleged hacking, such as Austar were later taken over by News Corp. NDS had originally been set up to provide security to News Corp's pay TV interests but emails obtained by Fairfax Media revealed they had also pursued a wider agenda by distributing the keys to rival set top box operators and seeking to obtain phone records of suspected rivals. The emails were from the hard drive of NDS European chief, Ray Adams. In 2012 it was also revealed that Australian Federal police were working with UK police to investigate hacking by News Corp.

== Criticism of coverage by News Corporation-owned outlets ==
Various News Corporation owned media outlets have come out in defense of News Corporation, these defenses have themselves met with criticism. The Wall Street Journal, a News Corporation owned outlet, opined that "politicians and our competitors are using the phone-hacking years ago at a British corner of News Corp. to assail the Journal, and perhaps injure press freedom in general." The Times of London, also owned by NewsCorp, published an editorial cartoon labeled "Priorities" that depicted three naked Somalians holding empty bowls. One said, "I've had a bellyful of phone-hacking ...".

Researchers from the Australian Centre for Independent Journalism reported that Newscorp's Australian papers gave the scandal much less coverage than independent papers. The authors also reported that "all papers carried at least one editorial [...] on phone hacking [...] Not one editorial supported the idea that there should be an inquiry into Australia's media."

== See also ==
- Journalistic scandal
- News media phone hacking scandal
- Phone hacking scandal reference lists
- Metropolitan Police role in the news media phone hacking scandal
- Phone hacking scandal comparisons with the Watergate scandal
