= 2009–2011 News of the World phone hacking scandal investigations =

The News of the World phone hacking scandal investigations followed the revelations in 2005 of voicemail interception on behalf of News of the World. Despite wider evidence of wrongdoing, the News of the World royal phone hacking scandal appeared resolved with the 2007 conviction of the News of the World royal editor Clive Goodman and the private investigator Glenn Mulcaire, and the resignation of editor Andy Coulson. However, a series of civil legal cases and investigations by newspapers, parliament and the police ultimately saw evidence of "industrial scale" phone hacking, leading to the closure of the News of the World on 10 July 2011. However, the affair did not end there, developing into the News Corporation ethics scandal as wrongdoing beyond the News of the World (including the United States) and beyond phone hacking (including paying police for information) came to light.

== Civil legal cases ==
The News of the World royal phone hacking scandal had raised evidence of victims being targeted outside the Royal Family, but this evidence did not lead to criminal proceedings. In lieu of criminal proceedings, several public figures commenced litigation against the News of the World's owner News International and against the private investigator Glenn Mulcaire. Those who began legal action included the football agent Sky Andrew, actress Sienna Miller, actor Steve Coogan, television presenter Chris Tarrant and football pundit Andy Gray. In December 2009, footballer Sol Campbell instructed his solicitor to contact the police in response to various media reports. The Max Clifford case, which in early 2010 had appeared to make likely the disclosure of previously secret News of the World documents, was settled out of court in March 2010, keeping the documents secret. The next month, reports of further legal action against the News of the World emerged. Those considering litigation against the paper included a football agent and ten MPs. The legal action re-opened the possibility of details emerging that the settlement with Clifford had kept secret.

=== Max Clifford case, 2010 ===
In March 2010 the News of the World settled out-of-court a case brought against it by publicist Max Clifford for intercepting his voicemail. After a lunch with Rebekah Brooks, the paper agreed to pay Clifford's legal fees and an undisclosed "personal payment" not described as damages, with the sum exceeding £1 million. The money was paid in exchange for Clifford giving the News of the World exclusive stories over the next several years.

The case had been expected to reveal the details of previous settlements the paper had made, including the £1 million spent in 2009, settling with three phone hacking victims, and the unfair dismissal claim won by Clive Goodman. Clifford had won court rulings in February earlier that year that meant that the News of the World would have had to disclose previously secret information regarding which journalists were involved in hacking voicemail messages. A judge ruled that Glenn Mulcaire had to disclose the names of all the journalists who targeted Clifford and also those who received transcripts of the messages. With the eventual settlement, however, the information was not made public.

=== HM Advocate v Sheridan and Sheridan ===
A report aired on Channel 4's Dispatches in October included remarks made by an unnamed source said to have been a former senior journalist at the News of the World who had worked alongside Coulson. The source alleged that Coulson had personally listened to messages obtained through phone hacking.

In December 2010, Coulson – while under oath as a witness in HM Advocate v Sheridan and Sheridan – denied any knowledge of phone hacking at the News of the World or that he knew the private investigator Glenn Mulcaire. The following day, the Crown Prosecution Service said that it had determined that there was insufficient evidence to charge Coulson over allegations that he was aware of phone hacking at the publication. The CPS said that witnesses interviewed by the Metropolitan Police – including those who had previously made allegations through media outlets – had not been willing to provide admissible evidence.

=== Sienna Miller case ===
New allegations about the conduct of News of the World executives emerged in December 2010. Papers lodged in the High Court by lawyers acting for Sienna Miller claimed to have uncovered evidence of the involvement of Ian Edmondson, a senior editor at the paper, in work undertaken by Mulcaire.

== Newspaper investigations ==
=== The Guardian ===
==== 2009 ====
Beginning on 8 July 2009, The Guardian made a series of allegations that the phone hacking activities at the News of the World went far beyond the activities for which the News of the World royal editor Clive Goodman was jailed in 2007, those activities being limited to members of the royal household. The paper alleged that hacking victims included public figures such as former deputy prime minister John Prescott, Manchester United manager Alex Ferguson, Tessa Jowell when she was Olympics Secretary, Boris Johnson when he was the opposition's spokesman on higher education, publicist Max Clifford and even Rebekah Brooks, then editor of the News of the World's sister paper The Sun. In addition to this The Guardian reported that News Group – the News of the World's parent company – paid out more than £1m to settle legal cases that threatened to reveal evidence of News of the World journalists using criminal methods (accessing mobile phone voicemails of various public figures) to obtain stories. The article further reported sources as stating that News Group staff used private investigators to access several thousand mobile phone accounts.

The News of the World denied The Guardian's claims, and its parent company, News Corporation, implored its competitor newspaper to share any evidence it had with police.

Prescott in particular was outraged at the fact that the police did not inform him of the phone tapping, but Assistant Commissioner John Yates stated that there was no actual evidence that Prescott's phone had been tapped.

Contrary to claims made by News of the World in 2007, The Guardian in July 2009 claimed that phone hacking activities were known to a range of staff at the tabloid including its then editor Andy Coulson. At the time The Guardian made these claims, Coulson had left News International and was director of Conservative Party communications and planning. Due to this, some claimed that the reporting was politically motivated. The Conservative Party was quick to stand by Coulson.

The Guardian also reported that the News of the World had made payments in excess of £1 million to three people subject to phone hacking, including Professional Footballers' Association chairman Gordon Taylor, with the out-of-court settlements subject to secrecy clauses. Around the same time, Private Eye revealed that The Guardian had, in order to avoid "all out war" with the News of the World, chosen not to tell the same Culture, Media and Sport Committee that the £700,000 payment to Taylor was signed off in June 2008, by the directors of News Group Newspapers, the News International subsidiary owning the News of the World - thus showing awareness of the matter at the highest levels. The reports led the Press Complaints Commission to reopen its inquiry into the matter (finding that it had not been "materially misled", leading The Guardian's editor Alan Rusbridger to resign from the PCC) and the Culture, Media and Sport Committee to reopen its inquiry.

==== 2010 ====
In January 2010, The Guardian revealed the out of court payment to Goodman on grounds of settling an unfair dismissal case, and the later subsequent payment to Mulcaire. This started a new series of both newspaper stories, and subsequent further written questions from the Commons Select Committee on Culture, Media and Sport, to both News International and its executives. In February 2010, The Guardian reported that three mobile phone companies had discovered that the voicemails of over a hundred of their customers had been hacked. The companies identified the customers in 2007, after Scotland Yard disclosed numbers that had been accessed by Goodman and Mulcaire. A freedom of information request by The Guardian found that the police had recovered 91 PIN codes for accessing other people's voicemails in material seized from Mulcaire and Goodman. In April 2010, it was revealed from Crown Prosecution Service documents that although police had named only eight individuals in court, the Scotland Yard inquiry had actually uncovered over 4,000 names or partial names and nearly 3,000 full or partial telephone numbers from the materials seized from Mulcaire and Goodman.

In February 2010 The Guardian revealed that under Coulson the News of the World had rehired a private investigator shortly after his release from a seven-year prison sentence for blackmail. The News of the World had used the investigator prior to his imprisonment, at a time when Coulson was deputy editor. In February 2010, The Guardian could not name Jonathan Rees as he was involved in a new criminal trial.

In September 2010 The Guardian revealed that in 2009 plans by the Home Office to ask Her Majesty's Inspectorate of Constabulary to review the police investigation into the phone hacking scandal were cancelled "after intense internal lobbying", with a senior Home Office official warning that the Metropolitan Police would "deeply resent" an inquiry. Several days later the paper revealed comments by former News of the World journalist Paul McMullan on how widespread phone hacking had been under Andy Coulson; McMullan was one of six former News of the World journalists "who have independently told the Guardian that Coulson ... knew that his reporters were engaging in unlawful acts.".

=== The New York Times ===
In September 2010, The New York Times published the results of an investigation it had begun in March which revealed further details about the extent of the News of the World's phone hacking, and about editor Andy Coulson's alleged knowledge of it. The investigation also revealed that a journalist at the News of the World had been attempting to hack into the voicemail messages of a "television personality" in 2010. The journalist was suspended from reporting and faced legal action by the personality.

The Times piece cited Sean Hoare, a former colleague, as saying that Coulson had "actively encouraged" phone hacking. Coulson denied the claims and indicated that he would allow himself to be questioned by the Metropolitan Police Service regarding the phone hacking affair.

== Press Complaints Commission investigations ==
The Guardian's 2009 investigation led the Press Complaints Commission to reopen its inquiry into the matter (finding that it had not been "materially misled", leading The Guardian's editor Alan Rusbridger to resign from the PCC) and the Culture, Media and Sport Committee to reopen its inquiry.

== Police investigations ==
=== 2009 review of original investigation ===
In light of the new allegations in The Guardian in July 2009, the Metropolitan Police Service commissioner Sir Paul Stephenson asked his assistant commissioner John Yates to review the original 2006 investigation for new evidence. In one 8-hour meeting, Yates reviewed the investigation and decided not to take any further action. In a public statement later, and in a July 2009, appearance at the Home Affairs Select Committee, he said of the initial investigation that he "found it to be satisfactory." In a direct response to John Prescott, who had been particular outraged at the fact that police did not inform him of his phone being hacked, Yates specifically stated that there was no material evidence that Prescott's phone had been hacked. Yates then passed his findings back to the Chief Constable, and in agreement with lawyers and the head of the Crown Prosecution Service Keir Starmer, agreed that no further action need be taken, and the case not re-opened. The Metropolitan Police hence declined to re-open their hacking inquiry in response to the claims in The Guardian stating that "no additional evidence has come to light" and it "therefore consider[ed] that no further investigation is required".

=== 2010 ===
The original Metropolitan Police investigation attracted renewed attention in April 2010, when it emerged that Andy Hayman, an assistant commissioner and the officer responsible for overseeing the original 2006 Scotland Yard inquiry, had quit the police force to work for News International as a columnist.

In September 2010, with the opening of parliamentary inquiries following The New York Times investigation, the Metropolitan Police also indicated its intention to re-examine the allegations regarding the News of the World, saying that it would consider new information that it had received.

=== 2011 ===
In January 2011, following evidence emerging from the civil case by Sienna Miller, the Crown Prosecution Service announced a review of the evidence collected during the Metropolitan Police's original investigation into phone hacking at the News of the World. The director of public prosecutions, Keir Starmer QC, said that the decision was motivated in part by developments in the civil courts.

In April 2011 the Metropolitan Police admitted that in the previous four years it had only contacted 36 people to warn them that they might have been victims of phone hacking.

=== Operation Weeting ===
The Metropolitan Police announced on 26 January 2011, that it would begin a new and fresh investigation into the phone hacking affair, following the receipt of "significant new information" regarding the conduct of News of the World employees. Operation Weeting would take place alongside the previously announced review of phone hacking evidence by the Crown Prosecution Service.

== Parliamentary investigations ==
In December 2009, a parliamentary question was tabled about the possible tapping of minister Tessa Jowell's phone.

=== Select Committee report (2009 – February 2010) ===
Tom Watson, the Labour MP for West Bromwich East, played a key role in bringing the revelations about phone hacking into the open. Watson was concerned by alleged press misconduct, as were his colleagues Chris Bryant, the MP for Rhondda, Khalid Mahmood, MP for Birmingham Perry Barr, and Siôn Simon, then MP for Birmingham Erdington. Watson joined the Culture, Media and Sport Committee in 2009, under the chairmanship of Conservative MP John Whittingdale, specifically to pose questions to leading figures in News International about the ethics at both The Sun and the News of the World, and allowing him to quiz Andy Coulson, who was director of communications for the Conservative Party, about his role at the News of the World.

In July 2009, in evidence to the Culture, Media and Sport Committee inquiry into privacy and libel issues that also covered the phone hacking affair, News of the World editor Colin Myler placed on record that a sum of £700,000 was agreed to be paid to PFA chief Gordon Taylor by News International's head of legal affairs, Tom Crone. This was supported and agreed by Myler, with final approval given from News International executive chairman James Murdoch.

On 24 February 2010, the Culture, Media and Sport Committee issued their report. It condemned the testimony of the News of the World witnesses, referring to "collective amnesia" and "deliberate obfuscation", and noted News International chief executive Rebekah Brooks' refusal to appear at all. The Committee concluded:

We strongly condemn this behaviour which reinforces the widely held impression that the press generally regard themselves as unaccountable and that News International in particular has sought to conceal the truth about what really occurred.

Other News International newspapers, including The Sun and The Times, downplayed the report, devoting minimal coverage to it and emphasising the News of the World's response.

=== New inquiries (September 2010) ===
In the wake of the renewed allegations in September 2010, from The New York Times, the Home Affairs Select Committee in London opened a new inquiry into phone hacking. Two days after the Home Affairs Select Committee announced its inquiry, the House of Commons voted to refer allegations of hacking against politicians to the Standards and Privileges Committee, with the power to compel witnesses to give evidence.

== News International investigations ==
=== News Corporation internal re-investigation ===
News International started an investigation of the evidence within the companies files, headed by group general manager Will Lewis. Lewis quickly came across an email which referred to "the file" at the solicitors, and in December 2010, subsequently obtained all records held by Harbottle & Lewis regarding Clive Goodman's 2007 claim for unfair dismissal. Shocked at the content within the more than 200 emails, Lewis passed the file to another law firm, Hickman Rose.

In January 2011, this firm engaged Ken Macdonald, Lord Macdonald QC, the former head of the Crown Prosecution Service, to provide a report to the board of News Corporation on the contents of the emails. Macdonald's report stated that he found evidence of indirect hacking, breaches of national security and serious crime; he closed on advising them to immediately call the police. After a board meeting in New York chaired by Rupert Murdoch in January 2011, when Macdonald's report and recommendations were accepted in full, Macdonald immediately passed 11 emails in evidence formally to Metropolitan Police Assistant Commissioner Cressida Dick.

Subsequently, the News of the World disclosed that it had suspended Ian Edmondson, saying that it would take "appropriate action" if the litigation or the paper's own internal investigation found evidence of wrongdoing by any staff. News International announced that they had sacked Ian Edmondson on 26 January 2011, the same day that the Metropolitan Police launched Operation Weeting.

== Hugh Grant ==
In April 2011 actor Hugh Grant published an article in the New Statesman entitled "The Bugger, Bugged" about a conversation following a chance encounter with Paul McMullan, former journalist and paparazzo for News of the World. In unguarded comments which were secretly taped by Grant, McMullan alleged that editors at the Daily Mail and News of the World, particularly Andy Coulson, had ordered journalists to engage in illegal phone tapping and had done so with the full knowledge of senior British politicians. McMullan also said that every British Prime Minister from Margaret Thatcher onwards had cultivated a close relationship with Rupert Murdoch and his senior executives. He stressed the friendship between David Cameron and Rebekah Brooks (née Wade), agreeing when asked that both of them must have been aware of illegal phone tapping, and asserting that Cameron's inaction could be explained by self-interest:

"Cameron is very much in debt to Rebekah Wade for helping him not quite win the election... So that was my submission to parliament – that Cameron's either a liar or an idiot."

When asked by Grant whether Cameron had encouraged the Metropolitan Police to "drag their feet" on investigating illegal phone tapping by Murdoch's journalists, McMullan agreed that this had happened, but also stated that the police themselves had taken bribes from tabloid journalists, so had a motive to comply:

"20 per cent of the Met has taken backhanders from tabloid hacks. So why would they want to open up that can of worms?... And what's wrong with that, anyway? It doesn't hurt anyone particularly."

Grant's article attracted considerable interest, due to both the revelatory content of the taped conversation, and the novelty of Grant himself "turning the tables" on a tabloid journalist.

Whilst the allegations regarding the News of the World continued to receive coverage in the broadsheets and similar media (Grant appeared for example on BBC Radio 4) it was only with the revelation that the voicemail of the then missing and subsequently murdered Millie Dowler had been hacked, and evidence in her murder enquiry had been deleted, that the coverage turned from media interest to widespread public (and eventually political) outrage. Grant became something of a spokesman against Murdoch's News Corporation, culminating in an appearance on the BBC's Question Time in July 2011.

== Further investigations ==
Further investigations (beyond News of the World and/or beyond phone hacking) developed in 2011. Some of these also revealed further details of the phone hacking and of News International's handling of the phone hacking.

== See also ==
- Overview of news media phone hacking scandals
- News media phone hacking scandal reference lists
- CTB v News Group Newspapers Ltd
- List of victims of the News International phone hacking scandal
- Mosley v News Group Newspapers Ltd
- Politico-media complex
- Sheridan v News Group Newspapers Ltd
