= The News Building =

The News Building may refer to:

- Daily News Building or the News Building, headquarters of the New York Daily News until 1995, in New York City, USA
- The News Building (London), headquarters of News UK in London, United Kingdom
