= List of victims of the News International phone hacking scandal =

The following people have been identified as victims of the News International phone hacking scandal.

The victims of the phone hacking fall broadly into three categories, as identified by Nick Davies writing in The Guardian:

First, there are those people who have been approached and warned by The Scotland Yard that there was hard evidence of their voicemail being accessed without authority. Some were warned at the time of the original inquiry in 2006. Others were warned only after the Guardian revived the story in July 2009. Scotland Yard refuse to say how many were warned at either time. They have said that they also approached and warned people in four 'national security' categories if there was reasonable grounds to suspect that their voicemail might have been accessed without authority - members of the royal household, the military, the police and the government. But here again, they refuse to say how many people they warned in each of those categories.

Second, there are those who have taken the initiative to approach Scotland Yard and to ask whether the police hold any evidence that they were targeted in any way by Mulcaire. Scotland Yard are holding the results of an analysis of phone records which, we now know, revealed "a vast number" of people who had had their voicemail accessed; and also a spreadsheet which summarises the contents of the mass of paperwork, audio tapes and computer records which police seized from Mulcaire and which, the Guardian discovered, included 4,332 names or partial names; 2,987 mobile phone numbers; 30 audio tapes of varying length; and 91 PIN codes of a kind which are needed to access voicemail with the minority of targets who change the factory settings on their mobile phones.

Third, there are 120 people who were identified by three mobile phone companies who followed up on Scotland Yard's original investigation and found that some of their users had had their voicemail accessed from numbers used by Glenn Mulcaire. Orange say they warned none of those whom they identified; Vodafone say they warned customers 'as appropriate'; O2 say they warned all of their customers whom they identified.

Name	Title	Warned by police/came forward	When warned/came forward, if known	Details
Ali Dizaei	Metropolitan Police commander	Warned by police	2011	Scotland Yard confirmed his name and/or other details are included in evidence held by police
Andy Coulson	Former editor of News of the World (NOTW), was David Cameron's chief spin doctor	Warned by police	2009	Warned by police after Guardian story in July 2009
Andy Gray	Former Sky Sports pundit, ex-footballer	Warned by mobile phone company	2006	Not named in indictment at trial. Has issued proceedings against the NOTW and Glenn Mulcaire for breach of privacy
Benedict Grant Noakes	Television producer, close friend of Paul McCartney and Heather Mills	Warned by police	2011	Scotland Yard confirmed his name and/or other details are included in evidence held by police
Boris Johnson	MP/Mayor of London/future prime minister	Warned by police	2006	Not named in indictment at trial
Brendan Montague	Investigative journalist	Warned by mobile phone company		Now seeking judicial review of Scotland Yard
Brian Paddick	Former deputy assistant commissioner of Metropolitan police (Met)	Approached Scotland Yard		Scotland Yard confirmed his name and/or other details are included in evidence held by police. Now seeking judicial review of Scotland Yard
Chris Bryant	MP	Approached Scotland Yard		Scotland Yard confirmed his name and/orI other details are included in evidence held by police. Now seeking judicial review of Scotland Yard
Chris Tarrant	TV presenter	Approached Scotland Yard		Scotland Yard confirmed his name and/or other details are included in evidence held by police
Colin Stagg	Exonerated murder suspect	Warned by police	2011	Scotland Yard confirmed his name and/or other details are included in evidence held by police.
David Davies	Executive Director of The Football Association	Warned by police	2009	Warned by police after Guardian story in July 2009
Elle Macpherson	Model	Warned by police	2006	Named in indictment at trial of Goodman and Mulcaire
George Galloway	MP	Warned by police	2006	Not named in indictment at trial. Has issued proceedings for breach of privacy against the NOTW and Glenn Mulcaire. Galloway claims he has been offered "substantial sums of money" by NOTW ahead of his court action.
Gordon Taylor	Former chief executive of the Professional Footballers' Association	Warned by police	2006	Named in indictment at trial of Goodman and Mulcaire. Sued the NOTW for breach of privacy and was paid costs and damages of some £700,000
Heather Mills	Charity and animal rights campaigner, ex-wife of Paul McCartney	Approached Scotland Yard		Scotland Yard confirmed her name and/or other details are included in evidence held by police
Helen Asprey	Aide to Charles, Prince of Wales	Warned by police	2006	Named in indictment at trial of Goodman and Mulcaire
Ian Blair	Former commissioner of Met police	Warned by police	2006	Not named in indictment at trial
Jamie Lowther-Pinkerton	Private secretary to Princes William and Harry	Warned by police	2006	Named in indictment at trial of Goodman and Mulcaire
Jo Armstrong	Legal adviser to Gordon Taylor	Warned by police	2009	Warned by police after Guardian story in July 2009. Sued the NOTW for breach of privacy and was paid costs and damages
John Prescott	MP	Approached Scotland Yard		Scotland Yard confirmed his name and/or other details are included in evidence held by police. Now seeking judicial review of Scotland Yard
Kieren Fallon	Jockey	Approached Scotland Yard		Scotland Yard confirmed his name and/or other details are included in evidence held by police. Now seeking judicial review of Scotland Yard
Max Clifford	Agent	Warned by police	2006	Named in indictment at trial of Goodman and Mulcaire. Sued the NOTW for breach of privacy and was paid approx £1m
Mike Fuller	Former assistant commissioner of Met police	Warned by police	2006	Not named in indictment at trial
Miss X	Alleged victim of rape by celebrity	Approached Scotland Yard		Scotland Yard confirmed her name and/or other details are included in evidence held by police
Nicola Phillips	Former assistant to Max Clifford	Approached Scotland Yard		Scotland Yard confirmed her name and/or other details are included in evidence held by police. Has issued proceedings against the News of the World for breach of privacy
Paddy Harverson	Prince Charles' communications secretary	Warned by police	2006	Named in indictment at trial of Goodman and Mulcaire
Paul Gascoigne	Footballer	Approached Scotland Yard		Scotland Yard confirmed his name and/or other details are included in evidence held by police. Now seeking judicial review of Scotland Yard
Prince Harry	Prince	Warned by police	2006	Omitted from indictment at trial as part of police strategy of 'ring fencing' evidence to protect sensitive victims
Prince William, Duke of Cambridge	Prince	Warned by police	2006	Omitted from indictment at trial as part of police strategy of 'ring fencing' evidence to protect sensitive victims
Rebekah Brooks	News International chief executive	Warned by police	2006	Not named in indictment at trial
Sienna Miller	Actor	Approached Scotland Yard		Scotland Yard confirmed her name and/or other details are included in evidence held by police
Simon Hughes	MP	Warned by police	2006	Named in indictment at trial of Goodman and Mulcaire
Sky Andrew	Football agent	Warned by police	2006	Named in indictment at trial of Goodman and Mulcaire. Has issued proceedings against the NOTW and Glenn Mulcaire for breach of privacy
Steve Coogan	Actor	Approached Scotland Yard		Scotland Yard confirmed his name and/or other details are included in evidence held by police
Tessa Jowell	MP	Warned by police	2006	Not named in indictment at trial
Tommy Sheridan	Leader of Solidarity	Approached Scotland Yard	2009	Given two sets of hacking notes by Glenn Muclaire dated 2004 from Met after court order, and published them during his perjury trial. Starting legal proceedings against NOTW, the Met and Mulcaire
Ulrika Jonsson	TV presenter	Warned by police	2011	Scotland Yard confirmed her name and/or other details are included in evidence held by police
Wayne Rooney	Footballer	Warned by police	2011	Scotland Yard confirmed his name and/or other details are included in evidence held by police

Six unnamed journalists working for the Mail on Sunday/Daily Mail have been warned by the police that their name and/or other details are included in evidence held by the police.

In addition to the people already identified as victims, a number of people have approached the police to say that they believe their phone was hacked by the News of the World.

- Actress Leslie Ash and her husband, former footballer Lee Chapman, have announced that they are considering legal action against the NOTW over suspicions that their voicemails, and those of their children, were eavesdropped in 2006.
- Alastair Campbell, Tony Blair's former communications director, believes his phone was hacked in 2003.
- Lawyers acting for RMT trade union leader Bob Crow have written to the Metropolitan Police asking for any evidence or information that they may have uncovered in respect of NOTW. Crow has suspicions that "journalists may have had access to private information about my movements and my union's activities that date back to the year 2000".
- The interior designer Kelly Hoppen has lodged a claim against the NOTW and one of its reporters, Dan Evans, for "accessing or attempting to access her voicemail messages between June 2009 and March 2010".

== See also ==
- CTB v News Group Newspapers
- Mosley v News Group Newspapers Limited
- Sheridan v News International
