= Charlie Brooks (racehorse trainer) =

British socialite, newspaper columnist, and racehorse trainer

Charles Patrick Evelyn Brooks (born 3 March 1963) is a British socialite, newspaper columnist, racehorse trainer and former amateur jockey.

He is best known as the husband of Rebekah Brooks, chief executive of News UK. The couple are seen as leading lights of the so-called 'Chipping Norton set', a politically influential clique close to the former leadership of the Conservative Party. On 15 May 2012, Brooks and his wife were charged with perverting the course of justice. On 24 June 2014, the High Court found Brooks and his wife Rebekah not guilty.

== Early life ==
Brooks was born Charles Patrick Evelyn Brooks on 3 March 1963 in Chipping Norton. His father died when he was 12. Educated at Eton College, which he attended with future Prime Minister David Cameron (three years his junior), Brooks became an amateur jockey and assistant racehorse trainer to Fred Winter. In 1987, Mr Winter fell down stairs and had a stroke, leaving him unable to walk or speak. Brooks carried on as assistant trainer, keeping Uplands going, until in 1989 he took over the licence to train, by default. In 1987 he won the Christie's Foxhunter Chase on Observe.

== Racehorse trainer ==
Among Brooks's successes as a trainer were Suny Bay, winner of the 1997 Hennessy Gold Cup, runner-up in the 1997 and 1998 Grand Nationals, and Couldn't be Better, winner of the 1995 Hennessy Gold Cup.

After a break of more than thirteen years, Brooks was reinstated as a licensed trainer in late 2011.

== Phone hacking controversy ==
During 2011 and 2012 Brooks became drawn into the Phone-hacking scandal by Rupert Murdoch's News International. In July 2011, fearing a "Jacqui Smith moment", Brooks hid a pornographic magazine called Lesbian Lovers and seven DVDs of lesbian porn in a Jiffy bag behind some bins in the underground car park of the couple's Chelsea home. Other concealed items said to be part of Mr Brooks' property included an Apple laptop, iPad and iPod as well as a Sony laptop and other documents. They were discovered by cleaner Fernando Nascimento on a routine rubbish collection the day after Brooks' wife Rebekah was arrested at a south London police station in connection with the phone hacking investigation. "I envisaged 20 policemen coming in and emptying every drawer and looking under every nook and cranny, and I did think about my DVDs," Brooks later explained. One of the laptops "had a bit of smut on it too", he added.

On 13 March 2012 Charlie and Rebekah Brooks were arrested in a dawn raid at their home, on suspicion of conspiracy to pervert the course of justice. They were charged with perverting the course of justice in May 2012.

Charlie and Rebekah Brooks appeared in court at the Old Bailey on 26 September 2012. Rebekah Brooks faced three charges and Charlie Brooks one charge of conspiring to pervert the course of justice by concealing material from police officers. Their trial started in October 2013.

In Brooks' own defence, his lawyer called him "foolish," "stupid" and "not academically gifted". One character witness, Sara Bradstock, told the court how he drank a pint of washing up liquid to get rid of a hangover. Brooks told the hacking trial that he felt "ashamed" and "mortified" over the bungled bid to hide property from police. Giving evidence at the Old Bailey, Charlie Brooks said he had done something "very stupid" but that the items stashed in an underground car park at the couple's London flat were his. The court heard that the property was hidden on 17 July 2011, the day police interviewed Mrs Brooks and carried out searches. He denied conspiring with his wife and News International head of security Mark Hanna to pervert the course of justice by concealing potential evidence. He said, "I'm mortified about the way I have embarrassed my wife. I'm furious with myself for being so stupid." He said he was also "under the influence" of alcohol but not "helplessly drunk" that day.

On 24 June 2014 the jury found Brooks and his wife not guilty of the charges against them.

On 15 October 2014 Brooks lost his bid to recover the £600,000 in legal fees he had incurred as a result of being a co-defendant in the phone-hacking trial. Mr Justice Saunders said he was satisfied that the conduct of Brooks and his co-defendant, the News of the World's former managing editor Stuart Kuttner, had "brought suspicion on themselves and misled the prosecution into thinking that the case against them was stronger than it was". The judge said that he accepted that Brooks hid the material, which included pornographic DVDs, for the reasons that he gave during the trial. However, in his ruling the judge said: "It was however incredibly stupid, as he himself has accepted, and gave rise to justifiable suspicions as to his conduct and the conduct of a number of others. I am quite satisfied that Mr Brooks brought suspicion on himself and others". Brooks said in a statement: "At least on a racecourse, when you back a winner the bookmakers pay you". His wife, Rebekah Brooks, had earlier dropped her application for an estimated £7m in costs in June after it emerged that News UK (formerly News International), which had indemnified her, was no longer looking to recoup its costs.

== Personal life ==
He married Rebekah Wade, then editor of The Sun, in June 2009. The wedding was attended by then Prime Minister Gordon Brown, and future Prime Minister David Cameron, who is a close personal friend of the couple. In January 2012 Charlie and Rebekah Brooks became parents via a surrogate mother.

At the start of the phone hacking trial, the court was told by lead prosecuting counsel Andrew Edis QC that Rebekah Brooks and Andy Coulson had had an affair over a period lasting at least six years from 1998 to 2004, the period when much of the alleged conspiracy was alleged to have taken place.
