= The News Building (London) =

Office building in London, England

Coordinates: 51.5054°N 0.0876°W

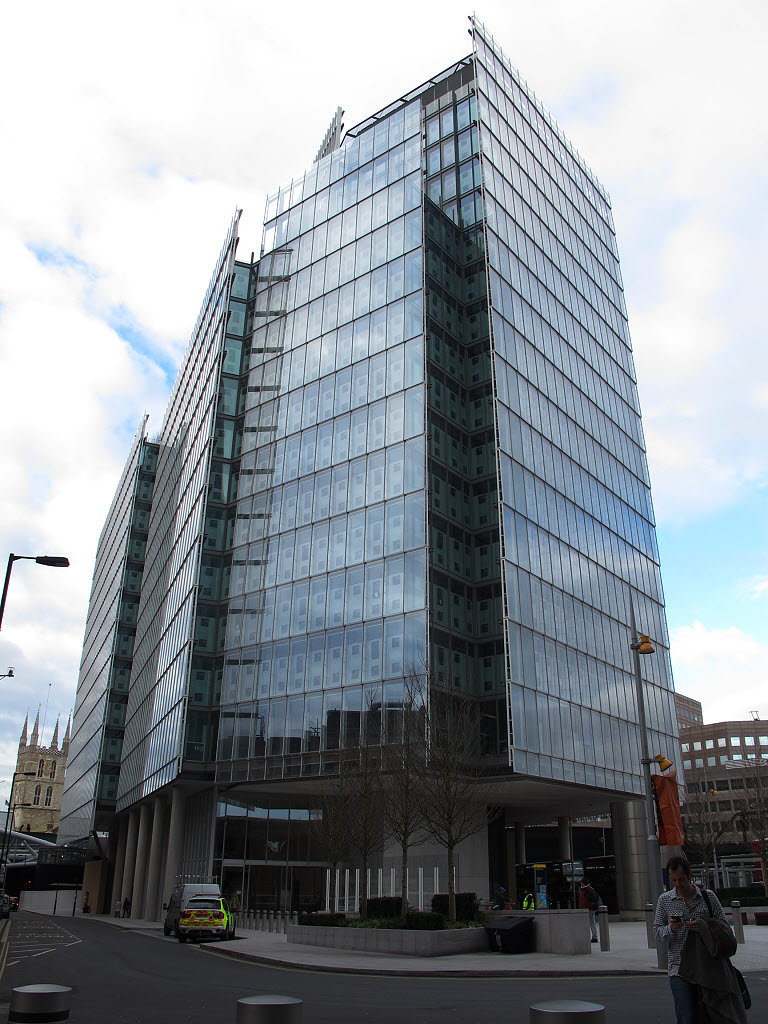
South side of The News Building

The News Building is a 17-storey office block in the London Bridge area of London that forms part of the Shard Quarter development. It houses all of News UK's London operations, including The Times, The Sunday Times, The Sun, The Wall Street Journal, Dow Jones, Talksport, Talk, Times Radio, Virgin Radio, and the book publisher HarperCollins. It was designed by the Italian architect Renzo Piano, who also designed The Shard across the piazza, and was financed by Qatar, which is behind the Shard Quarter development. Adamson Associates served as the executive architect.

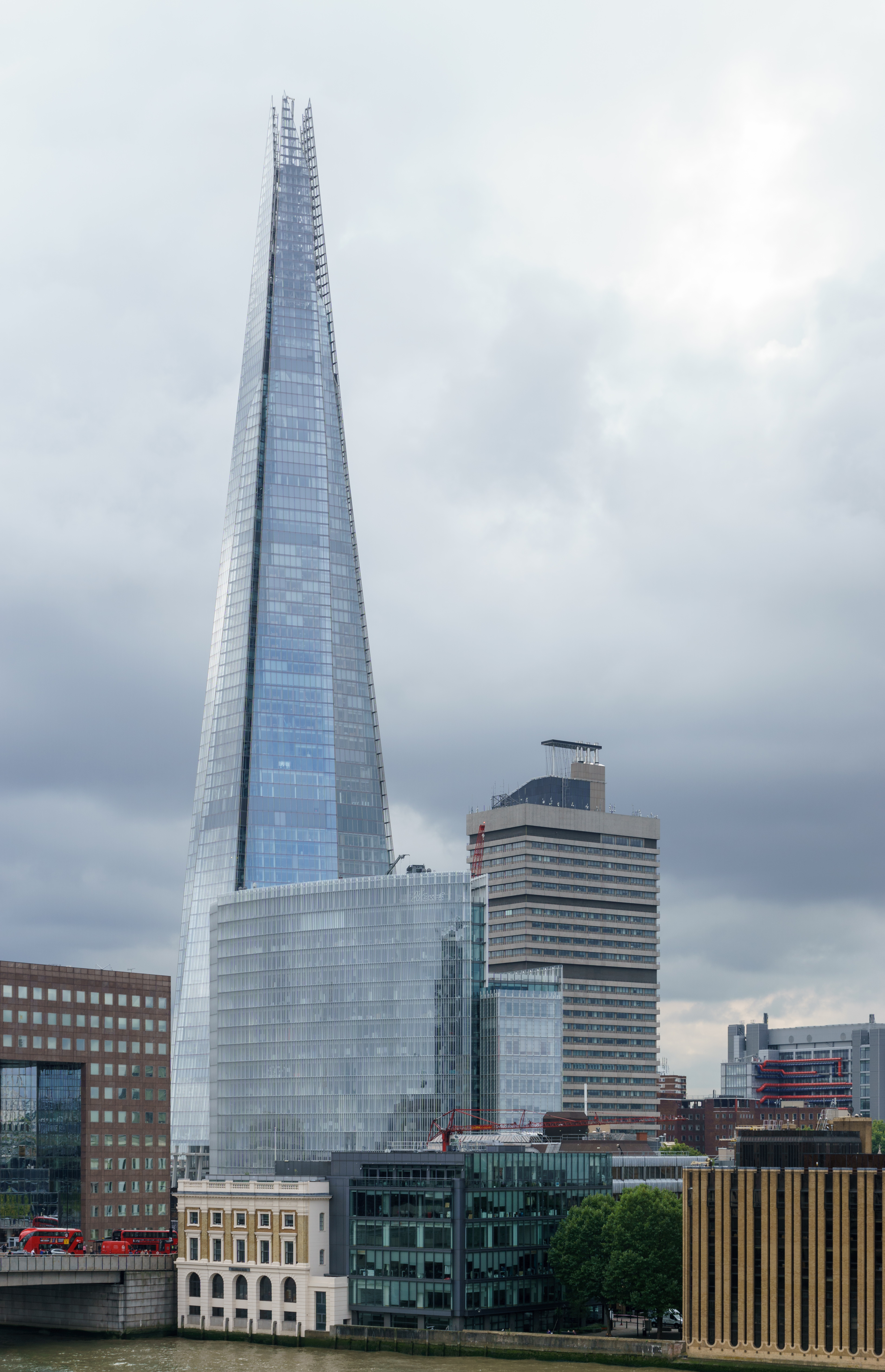
The News Building lies immediately in front of The Shard, with Guy's Hospital's Tower Wing to the right.

The News Building was known as The Place and The Baby Shard until 2014, when its name was changed. It was built on the site of the demolished New London Bridge House, designed by Richard Seifert, and was completed in 2013. At its base is a rebuilt bus and rail hub, London Bridge station.

The building was opened on 16 September 2014 by the Mayor of London, Boris Johnson.

In January 2017, Sky News opened a business studio in the building. The studio housed Ian King Live, Sky's flagship evening business TV programme, as well as business bulletins. In September 2019, Sky moved its business studios to join sister channel CNBC Europe at 10 Fleet Place.

On 19 July 2022, Extinction Rebellion activists smashed windows of the building in response to The Sun and The Times' coverage of the 2022 United Kingdom heatwave.
