= News UK =

British newspaper publisher

News Corp UK & Ireland Limited

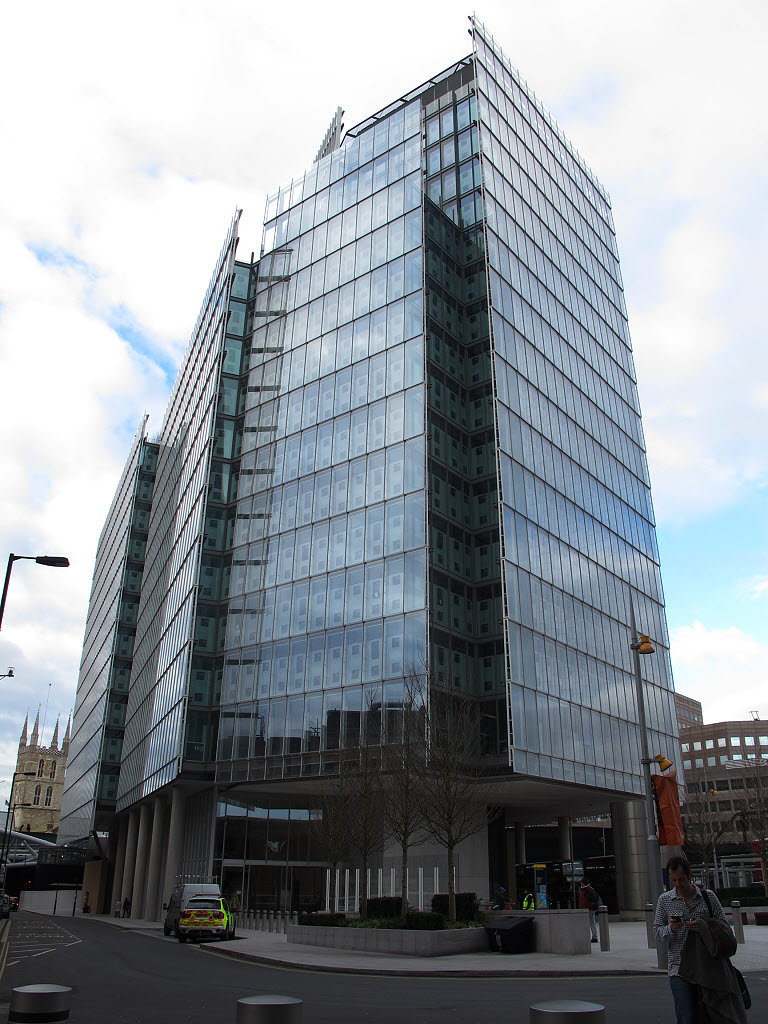
- South side of The News Building, London
- Trade name: News UK
- Formerly: News International (1981–2011); NI Group (2011–2013)
- Type: Subsidiary
- Industry: Mass media
- Founded: February 1981; 45 years ago
- Headquarters: London, England, UK
- Key people: Rupert Murdoch; James Murdoch; Rebekah Brooks; Rubén Darío Pérez Geijo
- Products: Newspapers, magazine, websites, radio, podcasting, television, advertising, marketing, gaming, betting
- Parent: News Corp
- Subsidiaries: News Broadcasting; The Sun; The Times; Talk TV; Talksport; Times Radio; Virgin Radio UK; TLS
- Website: news.co.uk

News Corp UK & Ireland Limited (trading as News UK, formerly News International and NI Group) is a British newspaper publisher, and a wholly owned subsidiary of the American mass media conglomerate News Corp. It is the current publisher of The Times, The Sunday Times, and The Sun newspapers; its former publications include the Today, News of the World, and The London Paper newspapers. It was established in February 1981 under the name News International plc. In June 2002, the company name was changed to News International Limited, and on 31 May 2011, to NI Group Limited, and on 26 June 2013 to News UK.

== History ==
Evolution of News Corp
- 1952: Rupert Murdoch inherited the News tabloid from his father and used it to develop a media conglomerate
- 1954: After acquiring News Limited, Murdoch purchased and established dozens of newspapers throughout Australia
- 1960s: News Limited began to expand globally and bought out several British tabloids like The Sun and News of the World
- 1980: To manage its growing operations, News Corporation was incorporated as the holding company for News Limited
- 1981: News International was formed to manage News Corp's British properties
- 1985: News Corporation officially expanded beyond print media and acquired the 20th Century-Fox film studio
- 1986: Metromedia stations were used to launch the Fox Broadcasting Network
- 1990: Fox Entertainment Group was established to manage News Corp's filmed entertainment properties
- Mid 1990s: Fox Sports and Fox News were launched, with both becoming leaders in cable news and sports programming
- 2004: News Corp relocated from its long time Adelaide headquarters to New York City at 1211 Avenue of Americas
- 2007: Dow Jones & Company was acquired, giving News Corp financial news outlets like the The Wall Street Journal
- 2013: Following controversies involving the News of the World in 2011, investors pushed for changes, leading to the second News Corp and 21st Century Fox
- 2019: The Walt Disney Company acquired majority of 21st Century Fox, while the remaining news, sports, and broadcast units became Fox Corporation
- 2023: Attempts to remerge News Corp and Fox were explored but later withdrawn

Between 1987 and 1995, News International owned, through its subsidiary News (UK) Ltd, Today, the first UK national newspaper to be printed in colour. All of News International's newspapers (with the exception of The London Paper, launched in 2006) were founded by other owners, in some cases hundreds of years ago.

In October 2005, News International sold TSL Education, publisher of Times Higher Education, Times Educational Supplement, and other education titles, for £235m ($415m). The Times Literary Supplement, previously part of TSL Education, was retained by News International as part of the deal. Darwin Ltd, which had taken over the company, continued to produce the same product.

=== Phone hacking allegations ===
In July 2009, The Guardian, a newspaper owned by Guardian Media Group, reported that News Group Newspapers paid in excess of £1m to settle legal cases that threatened to reveal News Group journalists' use on repeated occasions of illegal methods in the pursuit of stories. It was alleged that News Group staff were engaging in phone hacking, including Clive Goodman, illegally accessing the mobile phone voicemails of thousands of public figures, including politicians and celebrities. Goodman was jailed in 2007 for tapping the mobile phones of three members of the royal staff; this is an offence under the Regulation of Investigatory Powers Act. It was stated by News International at the time that Goodman had acted without its knowledge, and that no other News International journalists made use of such methods.

The evidence uncovered by The Guardian showed that many more figures were in fact the subject of phone-taps, including Nigella Lawson, Lenny Henry, Gwyneth Paltrow, John Prescott, Boris Johnson, and Tessa Jowell. In 2008, the News of the World paid in excess of £400,000 in damages to Gordon Taylor, the chief executive of the Professional Footballers' Association, who was suing the newspaper for its involvement in the illegal interception of messages to his mobile phone. According to The Guardian, this payment, made in exchange for Taylor's silence, "prevented the public from knowing anything about the hundreds of pages of evidence which had been disclosed in Taylor's case".

In contrast to News International's earlier denials of knowledge, The Guardian cites suppressed evidence revealing that News of the World's editorial staff were involved with private investigators who engaged in illegal phone-hacking, and that both reporters and executives were commissioning purchases of confidential information; this is illegal unless it is shown to be in the public interest. Apparently these activities were well known within the News of the World, being "openly paid for by the accounts department with invoices which itemised illegal acts". The paperwork was alleged to show the above occurred during the tenure of Andy Coulson, who was chief press advisor to David Cameron, leader of the UK's Conservative Party, until his resignation on 21 January 2011.

On 4 July, The Guardian reported that a private investigator at the News of the World had hacked into the phone of murdered teenager Milly Dowler, causing both her parents and police investigating her murder to wrongly believe she was still alive. This occurred during the period that Rebekah Brooks (née Wade) was editor.

On 7 July, British newspaper The Daily Telegraph alleged that the families of dead British service personnel were targeted by private investigators working for the News of the World. This led to The Royal British Legion severing ties with the paper until such allegations are proved false. On the same day, James Murdoch announced the News of the World would be shut down after the publication of one more edition on 10 July 2011, due to the allegations. The newspaper had already been faced with the withdrawal of a number of sponsors which had advertised their products and services in the newspaper, not to mention the inevitable fall in sales that the newspaper would have faced had it remained in circulation.

On 15 July, Rebekah Brooks resigned as chief executive of News International. She commented thus on her departure:

As chief executive of the company, I feel a deep sense of responsibility for the people we have hurt and I want to reiterate how sorry I am for what we now know to have taken place. I have believed that the right and responsible action has been to lead us through the heat of the crisis. However my desire to remain on the bridge has made me a focal point of the debate. This is now detracting attention from all our honest endeavours to fix the problems of the past. Therefore I have given Rupert and James Murdoch my resignation. While it has been a subject of discussion, this time my resignation has been accepted. Rupert's wisdom, kindness and incisive advice has guided me throughout my career and James is an inspirational leader who has shown me great loyalty and friendship. I would like to thank them both for their support.

The Guardian newspaper, citing official company accounts, claims Brooks received a £10.8m payoff for leaving News International.

=== Brooks reappointed as CEO ===
In September 2015, Brooks was reappointed as CEO of the company, now named News UK.

== Operations ==
The company's major titles are published by subsidiary companies, Times Newspapers Ltd and News Group Newspapers. Until 2010, these newspapers were written at a large site in Wapping in east London, near Tower Hill, which earned the nickname "Fortress Wapping" after a fierce dispute with the union to which the workforce had previously belonged. The printing of the papers is now undertaken at plants in Waltham Cross, Knowsley, and Lanarkshire (the latter said by Rupert Murdoch, on the plant's opening in 2007, to be "the largest and fastest print press in the world").

The News Building, where all of News UK's London operations are based, was opened on 16 September 2014 by the Mayor of London, Boris Johnson.

=== Times Newspapers Ltd ===
Times Newspapers Limited publishes the compact daily newspaper The Times and the broadsheet The Sunday Times.

Times Newspapers was formed in 1967 when the Thomson Corporation purchased The Times from the Astor family and merged it with The Sunday Times, which it had owned since 1959. The company was purchased by Rupert Murdoch's News International in February 1981. The acquisition followed an intense 21 days of negotiations with the print unions, conducted by John Collier and Bill O'Neill. The Times Literary Supplement, Times Educational Supplement and Times Higher Education Supplement were also part of the group; the latter two publications have since been sold.

Times Newspapers Holdings Limited was incorporated as a private company on 3 June 1925 and was dissolved on 9 July 2024. The Times Limited has existed as a separate company since 1968 and as of September 2024, registered at the same address, as a private, limited, non-trading company.

An American edition of The Times was launched in New York City, Boston and some other East Coast US cities in 2006.

Rupert Murdoch has stated that the law and the independent board prevent him from exercising editorial control. However, an article in The Spectator following the resignation of James Harding stated that the trust has "never played much of a role in the 30 years Murdoch has owned the paper", and suggested that Murdoch had pressurised Harding to resign.

=== News Group Newspapers Ltd ===
News Group Newspapers Ltd publishes the tabloid newspaper The Sun. The News of the World was another tabloid newspaper owned by the company; however, its closure was announced on 7 July 2011, following new evidence about a phone hacking scandal at the newspaper. The final issue was released on 10 July 2011.

The News of the World was purchased by Murdoch in January 1969. The Sun was acquired in October 1969 from International Publishing Corporation.

Murdoch states that he acts as a "traditional proprietor"; exercising editorial control on major issues, such as which political party to back in a general election or policy on Europe.

=== NI Free Newspapers Limited ===
The London Paper was the first newspaper to be launched by News International rather than bought. It was an evening freesheet distributed at bus and rail stations in London. It was published five days a week from September 2006 to September 2009, when it closed down, faced with competition from other free papers.

=== Wireless Group Limited ===
In 2016, News UK acquired Wireless Group Limited, the operator of a number of radio stations across the United Kingdom and Ireland.

=== Talk ===
In December 2020, Ofcom granted a licence to News UK & Ireland Limited to operate a new television channel on satellite and cable (not to be confused with Andrew Neil's GB News, which is a separate news channel launched in June 2021). At that time, News UK TV was overseen by David Rhodes who had been a Fox News executive and president of CBS News.

In April 2021, News UK CEO Rebekah Brooks announced that plans for the new service had been much reduced: a British equivalent of Fox was considered unviable; programmes would be available only via streaming. David Rhodes was to return to the US in June that year.

In September 2021, a few days after Neil had resigned as chairman of rival GB News, it was reported that News UK's channel would now be called TalkTV (after the radio stations TalkRadio and Talksport); Piers Morgan would be a presenter on the new service. News UK decided TalkTV would run on FreeSat, Freeview, Sky UK and Virgin Media (if slots could be acquired); the channel would feature current affairs, sport, and entertainment.

In response to poor viewer ratings the television channel was rebranded as "Talk" and became an internet-only service in 2024.

=== Other ===
- News International (Advertisements) Limited
- News International Associated Services Limited
- News International Distribution Limited
- News Ireland
- News Printers (Knowsley) Limited
- News Printers (Scotland) Limited
- News International Pension Trustees Limited
- News International Supply Company Limited
- News International Television Investment Company Limited
- News International Television Limited
- NI Syndication Limited
- The Fifth – Influencer Marketing Agency

== See also ==
- Metropolitan police role in phone hacking scandal
- News Corp Australia
- News International phone hacking scandal
- Phone hacking scandal reference lists
- List of companies based in London
