= Clive Goodman =

English journalist

Clive Goodman (born 17 September 1957, in Hammersmith, London) is an English journalist, former royal editor and reporter for the News of the World. He was arrested in August 2006 and jailed in January 2007 for intercepting mobile phone messages involving members of the royal household.

== Biography ==
Goodman initially worked as a journalist on Nigel Dempster's gossip column in the Daily Mail, before joining the News of the World as royal editor. He was among the tabloid journalists covering the breakdown of the marriage of Diana, Princess of Wales and Prince Charles, and at the time held the News of the World record for number of consecutive front page splashes, with five.

In March 2005, Goodman took over Mark Bolland's "Blackadder" column, reporting on details and rumours of the lives of public figures. It was during his tenure on this column that two entries raised suspicions with Royal Household staff that Goodman had gained access to the Royal Family's voicemails.

On 26 January 2007, Goodman was imprisoned for four months, having pleaded guilty to illegally intercepting phone messages from Clarence House; his co-conspirator Glenn Mulcaire was sentenced to six months. Goodman was sacked by the News of the World in January 2007, but within a year he received £240,000 in settlements, from News International. According to News International, the payments were made because his dismissal was unfair as they had failed to "follow statutory procedures" in sacking Goodman.

Goodman was arrested again, along with Andy Coulson, on 8 July 2011 after new revelations of the phone hacking were made public. It was announced that the News of the World would end its 168-year publication history on 10 July 2011.

Goodman was on trial in 2013–14 along with Coulson, Rebekah Brooks and a number of other former News of the World reporters and executives. The jury was unable to reach verdicts on two charges of conspiring to cause misconduct in public office in relation to the alleged purchase of confidential royal phone directories in 2005 from a palace police officer. On 30 June 2014 the trial judge, Mr Justice Saunders, announced that Goodman and the News of the Word's former editor, Andy Coulson, would face a retrial on the outstanding charges. On 17 April 2015, the Crown Prosecution Service announced that Goodman's retrial was to be scrapped, along with that of Coulson and the trials of seven other journalists. On 18 April 2015 Goodman was found formally not guilty of all charges at the Central Criminal Court.

== See also ==
- Amdocs (telephony) billing log data
- Israeli software role in espionage and counter espionage
- Metropolitan Police role in the news media phone hacking scandal
- News International phone hacking scandal
- News of the World royal phone hacking scandal
- News media phone hacking scandal reference lists
- R v Coulson, Brooks and others
