= Rebekah Brooks =

English journalist (born 1968)

- Born: Rebekah Mary Wade; 27 May 1968 (age 58); Warrington, Lancashire, England
- Occupations: CEO, News UK; Journalist, newspaper editor, media executive
- Notable credit(s): The Post, The Sun, News of the World
- Spouses: Ross Kemp (m. 2002; div. 2009) Charlie Brooks (m. 2009)
- Children: 1

Rebekah Mary Brooks (née Wade; born 27 May 1968) is a British media executive and former journalist and newspaper editor. She has been chief executive officer of News UK since 2015. She was previously CEO of News International from 2009 to 2011 and was the youngest editor of a British national newspaper at News of the World, from 2000 to 2003, and the first female editor of The Sun, from 2003 to 2009. Brooks married actor Ross Kemp in 2002. They divorced in 2009 and she married former racehorse trainer and author Charlie Brooks.

Brooks was a prominent figure in the News International phone hacking scandal, having been the editor of News of the World from 2000 to 2003 when one of the stories which involved illegal phone hacking was published by the newspaper. Following a criminal trial in 2014 she was found not guilty of conspiracy to hack voicemails, two counts of conspiracy to pay public officials and two counts of conspiracy to pervert the course of justice by a jury at the Old Bailey.

In September 2015, Brooks was confirmed as CEO of News UK, the renamed News International, re-establishing a working relationship with Rupert Murdoch, founder and chairman of News Corp, and founder and executive chairman of American conservative cable news channel Fox News.

== Early life ==
Rebekah Mary Wade was born in 1968 in Warrington. She grew up in Daresbury, where her parents ran a tree pruning business.

When she was 14, she decided she wanted to be a journalist and would make tea at her local newspaper and help out generally. She attended Appleton Hall High School – a state comprehensive school that had previously been a grammar school – in Appleton, Warrington. A childhood friend, Louise Weir, described her as "more emotionally intelligent than academic", charming and always able to get what she wanted out of people.

In Brooks's entry in Who's Who, she stated that she had studied at the Sorbonne in Paris, but did not claim to have a degree, and did not later answer questions about this. In a 2003 Spectator article, Stephen Glover suggested that, since she was working at the age of 20 for the News of the World, "we can safely assume that she did not study at the Sorbonne in any meaningful way". In 2010, Brooks was awarded an honorary Fellowship from the University of the Arts, London, for contributions to journalism. She briefly attended the London College of Communication, now part of the university, as a student but did not graduate.

The commentator Henry Porter claims little is known of Brooks personally. Tim Minogue, who was one of her first co-editors before becoming a journalist at Private Eye magazine, recalled a "likeable, skinny, hollow-eyed girl who was very ambitious".

== Career ==
After school, she worked for the French magazine L'architecture d'aujourd'hui in Paris, before returning to Britain to work for Eddy Shah's Messenger Group. Graham Ball, the then features editor at The Post newspaper, recalled that she was a notably astute and intelligent staff member. When The Post was disbanded, Brooks then moved to the News of the World.

=== News of the World ===
Brooks joined the Sunday newspaper News of the World in 1989 as a secretary, before working as a feature writer for its magazine, eventually becoming the paper's deputy editor. In 1994, she prepared for the News of the World's interview with James Hewitt, a lover of Diana, Princess of Wales, by reserving a hotel suite and hiring a team to "kit it out with secret tape devices in various flowerpots and cupboards", Piers Morgan, her former boss, wrote in his memoir The Insider, The New York Times relayed in July 2011. In 1998, she transferred to the News of the World's daily counterpart, The Sun, for a short time. She then returned to the News of the World in 2000 as editor; at the time, she was the youngest editor of a national British newspaper.

While at the News of the World, Brooks oversaw its campaign of "naming and shaming" individuals suspected to be convicted child sex offenders — a campaign launched in the wake of the murder of Sarah Payne, while hacking Payne's mother's voicemail. The paper's decision led to angry mobs terrorising those they suspected of being child sex offenders, which included several cases of mistaken identity and one instance where a paediatrician had her house vandalised, apparently by people who thought her occupation meant she was a paedophile.

The campaign was described as "grossly irresponsible" journalism by the Chief Constable of the Gloucestershire Police, Tony Butler, but Brooks defended the paper's actions on the BBC's Breakfast with Frost, claiming that it was "only right that the public have controlled access" to information on sex offenders. The paper's already strong sales held up well under her leadership, while those of rival Sunday newspapers The People and the Sunday Mirror fell more sharply.

=== The Sun ===
In January 2003, she returned to The Sun, replacing her former boss David Yelland, to become its first female editor. On Brooks's first day as editor, the Page 3 girl was Rebekah Parmar-Teasdale – the caption to the picture was "Rebekah from Wapping". Soon after becoming editor, Brooks ran the headline "Bonkers Bruno Locked Up" concerning the mental health problems of former heavyweight boxing champion Frank Bruno. The next day The Sun ran a 600-word reply from the head of the mental health charity SANE and since then has adopted a style guide on covering mental health stories prepared by the same charity. Brooks and her husband spent a day with the head of SANE and made donations to the charity.

On her appointment as editor of The Sun, she said, "It's the best job in newspapers." It was said of her by David Yelland, a former editor of The Sun, "She's good at schmoozing showbusiness people. She can turn people over and have dinner with them the next day".

During a March 2003 appearance before the House of Commons Select committee on Culture, Media and Sport as part of an inquiry into privacy issues, Brooks stated that her newspaper had paid police for information. Alison Clark, the director of corporate affairs at News International, later stated, "It is not company practice to pay police for information."

Brooks has been chairman of the organisation Women in Journalism and has served as a judge for the "Guardian Student Media Awards" in November 2003 and the tenth annual Police Bravery Awards in July 2005, the latter sponsored by The Sun.

=== News International ===
In June 2009, it was announced that she would leave The Sun in September 2009, to become chief executive of the newspaper's parent company, News International. Dominic Mohan was named her successor as editor of The Sun.

=== News UK ===
In September 2015, Brooks was reappointed as CEO of News UK, the renamed News International.

== Phone hacking scandal ==
A police enquiry revealed that the News of the World had a routine practice of intercepting mobile phone messages of celebrities, politicians and other public figures. The newspaper's reporter, Clive Goodman, and Glenn Mulcaire, a hired investigator, were convicted and jailed for intercepting the phone messages of members of the Royal Family in 2006.

=== Questioning by MPs ===
In 2003, under questioning by Chris Bryant MP of the Digital, Culture, Media and Sport Committee of the House of Commons, Brooks and Andy Coulson were asked whether either of their newspapers had ever been involved in various improper acts. Brooks replied "We have paid police for information in the past". Coulson added that payments were only made lawfully. The Sun, of which Brooks was editor, subsequently ridiculed Chris Bryant in a number of articles, starting with one about a photograph of him in his underpants from a gay dating website. Bryant has publicly alleged that his phone was hacked in 2003 by the News of the World. News International was ordered to pay Bryant £30,000 by a High Court judge in 2012 after Bryant filed a lawsuit. Brooks later claimed that in her response to Bryant's question she had merely been speaking about the widespread belief that payments had been made to police and denied having any knowledge of specific payments.

According to MPs, Brooks refused three times to attend the committee again to be questioned further, resulting in four committee members considering asking the Serjeant at Arms to issue a warrant forcing Brooks to attend. It was claimed by Adam Price, a Plaid Cymru MP, that the committee members subsequently dropped this proposal because they were warned by the chair of the committee, John Whittingdale, that their private lives would be investigated if they did so. However, this account is disputed by Whittingdale, who has stated there was a conversation about the possible repercussions of issuing a warrant for Brooks but said that did not have any bearing on his decision and he did not believe News International would target committee members.

On 11 May 2012, Brooks appeared as a witness in the Leveson Inquiry.

=== Milly Dowler ===
In 2011, The Guardian and a solicitor alleged that in 2002, when Brooks was editor, the paper had hacked the voicemail of missing schoolgirl Milly Dowler (later found to be murdered), to access messages left by her parents. It was later established that Brooks had been on holiday and out of the country when the story which referred to a message on the schoolgirl's phone was published and that, consequently, she did not edit the paper that day or read the article in question and, therefore, could not have known about the phone hacking. She was found not guilty of phone hacking at her trial in 2014.

=== Resignation ===
In July 2011, Labour Party leader Ed Miliband said Brooks should "consider her position" after the Milly Dowler allegations. Prime Minister David Cameron said that if Brooks had offered her resignation to him, he would have accepted it. Milly Dowler's parents also called for Brooks's resignation.

When Brooks told News of the World staff that the newspaper was being closed down, some reportedly said that all of their jobs had been sacrificed to save hers. Andreas Whittam Smith suggested that Brooks's decision not to resign was symptomatic of "the self-serving, conceited thesis that 'only I, who was at the helm during the disaster, can steer us to safety'".

On 14 July, News Corporation's second largest shareholder, Prince Al-Waleed bin Talal Al-Saud, called for her resignation in a BBC interview.

Having previously had an offer of resignation rejected, Brooks resigned from News International on 15 July 2011. She said: "As chief executive of the company, I feel a deep sense of responsibility for the people we have hurt and I want to reiterate how sorry I am for what we now know to have taken place. I have believed that the right and responsible action has been to lead us through the heat of the crisis. However my desire to remain on the bridge has made me a focal point of the debate. This is now detracting attention from all our honest endeavours to fix the problems of the past. Therefore I have given Rupert and James Murdoch my resignation. While it has been a subject of discussion, this time my resignation has been accepted".

The Daily Telegraph reported that despite resigning from her position, Brooks remained on the company payroll and continued to receive her salary from News International, having been told by Rupert Murdoch to "travel the world on him for a year".

==== £10 million payout ====
The Guardian newspaper, citing official company accounts, claims Brooks received a £10.8 million payoff for leaving News International.

=== Arrests and prosecution ===
On 17 July 2011, Brooks was arrested by police on suspicion of conspiring to intercept communications and on suspicion of corruption allegations. She was arrested by detectives working on Operation Weeting, the Metropolitan Police's phone hacking probe, and Operation Elveden, the probe examining illicit payments to police officers. Brooks's public relations agent Dave Wilson told CNN that she did not know she was going to be arrested when she arrived for a pre-arranged interview with London's Metropolitan Police Service. After 12 hours in custody, Brooks was released on bail until October 2011. On 13 March 2012, Brooks was rearrested, together with her husband, on suspicion of conspiracy to pervert the course of justice. Ninety people have been arrested in conjunction with illegal acquisition of confidential information since police renewed investigations in 2011, many of them employees or agents of newspapers for which Brooks had responsibilities. Sixteen have been formally charged with crimes.

On 15 May 2012, the Crown Prosecution Service (CPS) charged Brooks and five others with conspiring to pervert the course of justice. Charged along with Brooks regarding removal of documents and computers to conceal them from investigating detectives were her husband, her personal assistant, her bodyguard, her chauffeur, and the head of security at News International. These charges were made about 1 year after the Metropolitan Police Service reopened its dormant investigation into phone hacking, about 3 years after the then Assistant Commissioner of the Metropolitan Police Service told the Commons Culture, Media and Sport Committee that "no additional evidence has come to light," five years after News International executives began claiming that phone hacking was the work of a single "rogue reporter", 10 years after The Guardian began reporting that the Met had evidence of widespread illegal acquisition of confidential information, and 13 years after the Met began accumulating "boxloads" of that evidence, including information sources for News of the World journalists, but kept it unexamined in rubbish bags at Scotland Yard.

Brooks's trial over the phone-hacking claims began on 28 October 2013.

On 31 October 2013, it was revealed she had had an affair lasting at least six years with Andy Coulson, another key figure in the phone-hacking scandal.

On 24 June 2014, Rebekah Brooks was found not guilty on all charges related to the phone hacking.

=== Reappointed CEO ===
In September 2015, Brooks was reappointed as CEO of the company, now named News UK. In January 2020, it was announced she would become a board member at Tremor International Limited.

== Political connections ==
The press have noted social ties between Brooks and various members of the Establishment. In 2008, she borrowed a retired police horse from the Metropolitan Police which she kept on her Oxfordshire farm, where it was ridden by David Cameron. In December 2010, a dinner party was attended by Cameron and James Murdoch. Brooks was once also a friend of Tony and Cherie Blair; and Gordon and Sarah Brown. Her wedding to Charlie Brooks in 2009 was attended by Gordon Brown and David Cameron.

Shortly before her arrest in 2011, she had an hour-long telephone conversation with Tony Blair. He offered to act as an unofficial advisor to Brooks and to Rupert and James Murdoch. Blair told Brooks that this arrangement should remain private. He offered her advice on how to deal with the phone hacking scandal. Making reference to the Hutton Inquiry, which had cleared his government of wrongdoing related to the death of a biological warfare expert, Blair advised Brooks to set up an independent inquiry into the phone hacking scandal.

== Personal life ==
Brooks became engaged to actor Ross Kemp in 1996, and married him in June 2002 in Las Vegas. On 3 November 2005, it was reported that Brooks had been arrested following an alleged assault on her husband. She was released without charge, and the police took no further action. The Sun had been running a campaign against domestic violence at the time. The couple had spent the previous evening in the company of the former Cabinet Minister David Blunkett, who had resigned for the second time on that day. At her trial in 2013, it was revealed that Brooks and her married colleague, Andy Coulson had an affair that lasted from 1998 to 2007 during her marriage to Kemp.

Private Eye and The Independent reported the couple had separated, although it was not widely reported in the rest of the British press. The 7 March 2008 issue of Private Eye referred to her "paramour", former racehorse trainer and author Charlie Brooks. She and Kemp divorced in 2009. The Guardian reported on 5 June 2009 that she was to marry Brooks. The Independent reported Brooks and her fiancé had married in a lakeside ceremony in June 2009. The couple are key members of the so-called Chipping Norton set, which includes Jeremy Clarkson, David Cameron, and others. They live in Churchill, Oxfordshire, and London.

It was announced by Bell Pottinger that Rebekah and Charlie Brooks were expecting a daughter in early 2012 via a surrogate mother. A daughter was born at the private Portland Hospital in London on 25 January 2012.

== See also ==
- Metropolitan police role in phone hacking scandal
- News Limited
- James Weatherup

Media offices
Preceded by Phil Hall	Deputy Editor of the News of the World; 1995–1998	Succeeded by Bob Bird
Preceded by Neil Wallis	Deputy Editor of The Sun; 1998–2000	Succeeded by Fergus Shanahan
Preceded by Phil Hall	Editor of the News of the World; 2000–2003	Succeeded by Andy Coulson
Preceded by David Yelland	Editor of The Sun; 2003–2009	Succeeded by Dominic Mohan
