= Clevedon Hall =

Victorian mansion in Clevedon, Somerset, England

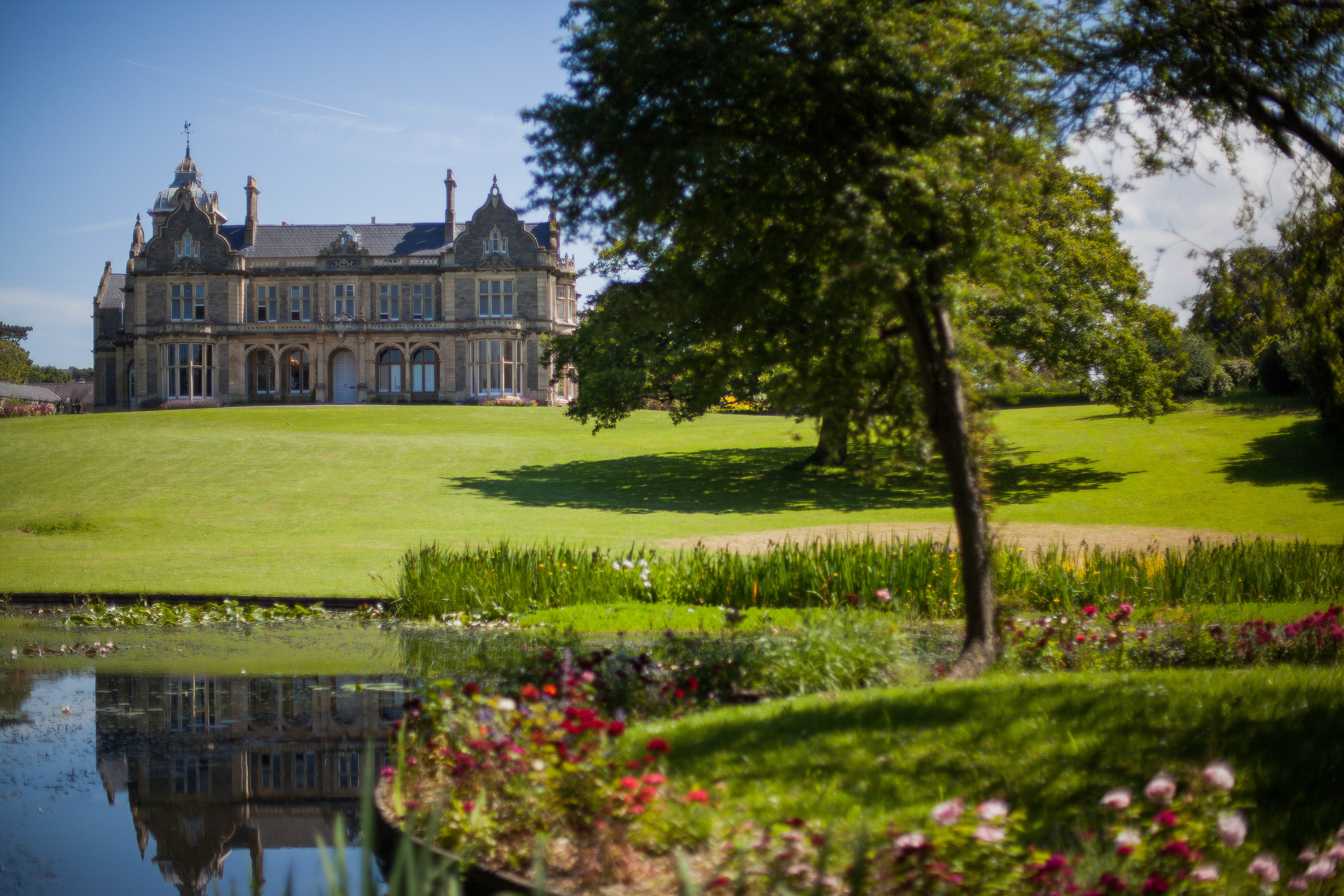
- A view from the gardens

- Location within Somerset
- 51°26′09″N 2°51′49″W
- Location: Clevedon, Somerset, England

History
- Built: 1850

Site notes
- Architect(s): Foster and Wood

Listed Building – Grade II*
- Official name: St Brandon's School for Girls
- Designated: 22 January 1976
- Reference no.: 1129704

Listed Building – Grade II
- Official name: Outbuilding in range to north of St Brandon's School
- Designated: 22 January 1976
- Reference no.: 1129705

Listed Building – Grade II
- Official name: Fountain in grounds to south of St Brandon's School
- Designated: 22 January 1976
- Reference no.: 1136555

Listed Building – Grade II
- Official name: Lodge at north entrance to grounds of St Brandon's School
- Designated: 22 January 1976
- Reference no.: 1136559

Listed Building – Grade II
- Official name: Boundary wall at St Brendon's School for Girls
- Designated: 22 January 1976
- Reference no.: 1136355

Clevedon Hall is a mansion with 17 acres (6.9 ha) of land in Clevedon, North Somerset, England. It is a Grade II* listed building. It is not to be confused with Clevedon Court, Cliveden on the Thames near Taplow, nor other houses with similar names.

Dating back to the 19th century, it has been used as a private house, hospital school, telemarketing center, and wedding venue.

== Architecture ==
The house was built in 1852 in a loosely Jacobean Revival style with a symmetrical seven-bay range to the front. Some of the interior features were imported from Leigh Court. In front of the building is an ornate stone fountain of a female figure in Greek Revival style, with a relief including angels, lions and dolphins. The gate lodge and outbuildings are also in a Jacobean style. The lodge and has tall chimneys and a pantile roof. The perimeter stone wall on the south, west and northern side of the property is supported by square buttresses.

== History ==
Clevedon Hall, originally named Frankfort Hall, was designed and built in 1852 by local architect firm Foster and Wood for Conrad William Finzel the 1st. Finzel was the owner of one of the UK's largest sugar refining businesses, Finzel's Sugar Refinery in Bristol, whose site has been redeveloped as Finzels Reach. The house and estate was built on land which originally formed part of the Clevedon Court estate. Frankfort Hall estate initially consisted of a small lodge, stable block. Frankfort Hall was built on the northeast boundary of newly built Elton Road with a stable block and small lodge. Conrad William Finzel 1st died in 1859 leaving Frankfort Hall to his son, Conrad William Curling Finzel who expanded the land to 16 acres (6.5 ha). C.W.C Finzel also built land holdings neighbouring Frankfort Hall with his partner John Budgett Esq.

According to the 1871 census, a head gardener was appointed to look after seven men, living in a second small lodge. Before this, in 1863, the carriage drive, a quarter of a mile long, was built from Victoria Road with gardens to the South of the hall being created by 1871. In 1877 John Budgett Esq. died. C.W C. Finzel had previously signed the deeds and his land share over to John before his death. John's executors collected the property and land holdings, including C.W.C Finzel's two properties; Frankfort Hall and The Salt House (a marine residence accessed along the drive and through the trees).

In 1877 the grounds of Frankfort Hall included: rustic summerhouses, melon pits, cucumber houses and detached stables and 3 acres (1.2 ha) of fruit and kitchen gardens. Two cottages and 70 acres (28 ha) of building land boasting views of the Bristol Channel and Welsh Hills accompanied The Salt House. Frankfort Hall was sold to Charles Hill around 1877 at which point the estate was renamed Clevedon Hall. Charles sold off the buildings and land he did not require leaving Clevedon Hall with a total of 54 acres (22 ha), in 1897 a small plot of land was purchased situated south of the Victoria Gate. Charles Hill died in 1900 leaving Clevedon Hall unsold until 22 October 1907. The estate was sold in three lots, one purchased by E.A. Trapnell who bought one lot with 20 acres (8.1 ha) for £8,000.

E.A. Trapnell became bankrupt in 1913 and The London and Provincial Bank repossessed the estate. In 1918 Reverend Harold Nelson Burden and wife Katherine Burden bought Clevedon Hall, following their 10-year lease. A year later, Katherine Burden died and Harold remarried soon after to Rosa Williams; superintendent of Stoke Park Colony (national institution to care for people with learning or neurological problems). In 1926 Stokes Croft Estate signed ownership of Clevedon Hall for a 33-year lease. Whilst the Burdens lived at Clevedon Hall, its use changed to institutional and was used by neighbouring residents of Stoke Park for respite to work in the grounds and gardens. Harold Burden died in 1930.

Following his death, Rosa Burden purchased Sailsbury Farm on the southern boundary of Clevedon Hall in 1932, increasing the land to 26 acres (11 ha). When Rosa died, Clevedon Hall was used as offices by Bristol Aeroplane Company who used the annexe within the hall to educate boys from the Bristol Technical School. Between 1941 and 1944 an air-raid shelter, Red Cross Station and a mess hut were erected within the Clevedon Hall grounds.

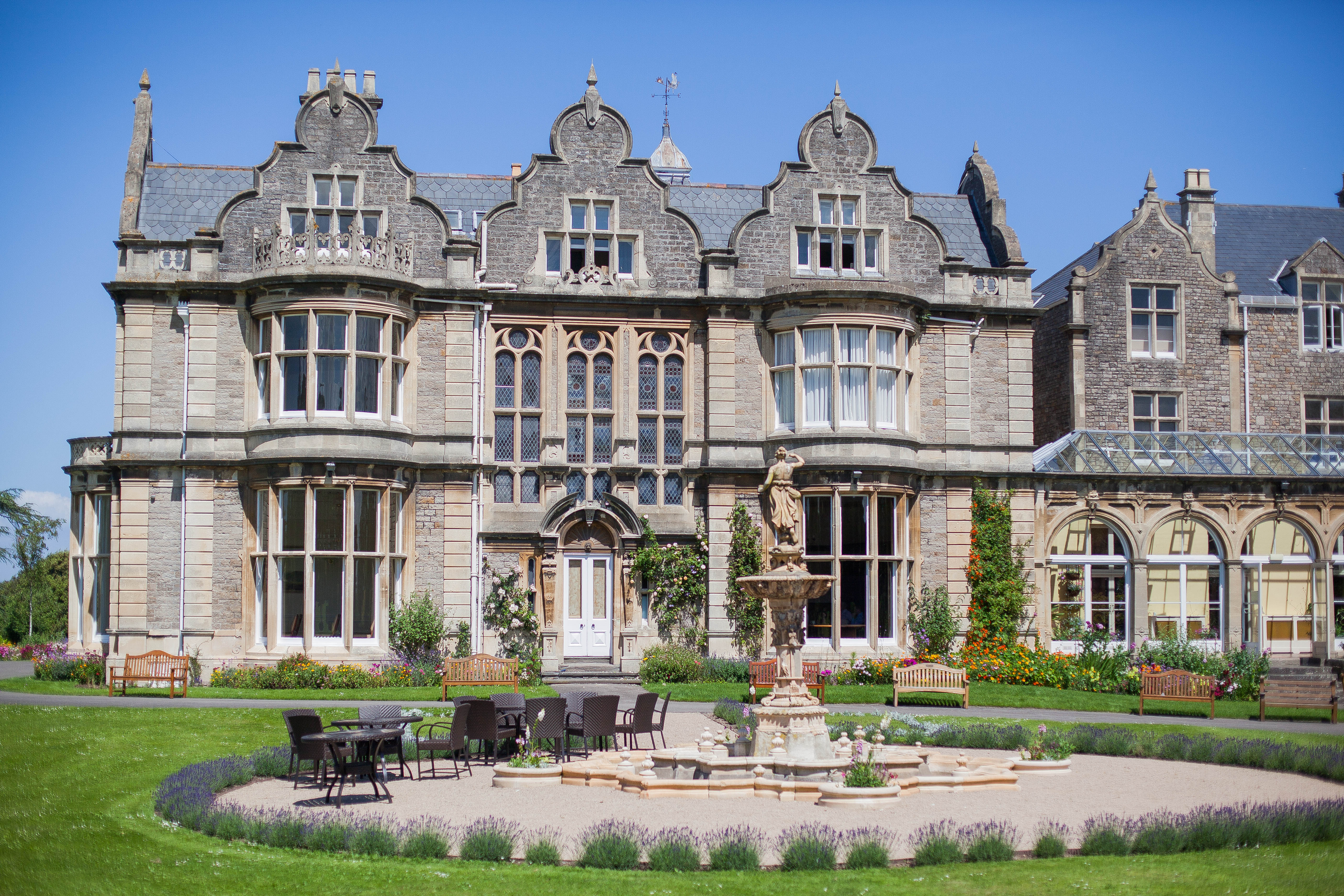
Clevedon Hall, North Somerset.

In 1945, St Brandon's Girls School, an independent girls boarding school bought Clevedon Hall who then sold land next to the carriage drive and some of the Salisbury Farm land. Across the following 40 years, new school buildings were constructed including the Junior School in 1971, which was extended in 1978 and again in 1989, remaining land was turned into a sports pitch. Other features included a sports hall, swimming pool, tennis courts and car parking. It erected some additional school buildings in the grounds, including a new wing which was opened by the Duchess of Gloucester in 1958. In the Burns' Day storm in 1990, a conservatory collapsed, and a pupil was killed and four, or possibly five, others injured. St Brandon's Girls School hit financial difficulty in 1990 forcing the Senior School to close a year later and selling the Infant and Junior Schools in 1992 but these continued to operate as educational institutions. St Brandon's Girls School officially closed its doors in 2004.

Peter and Sally McCarthy bought Clevedon Hall in 1991 and used the buildings as commercial offices until 2009. On 27 November 2010, Clevedon Hall re-opened as a wedding, corporate or private events venue.
