= Saint John the Evangelist (Domenichino) =

Painting by Domenichino

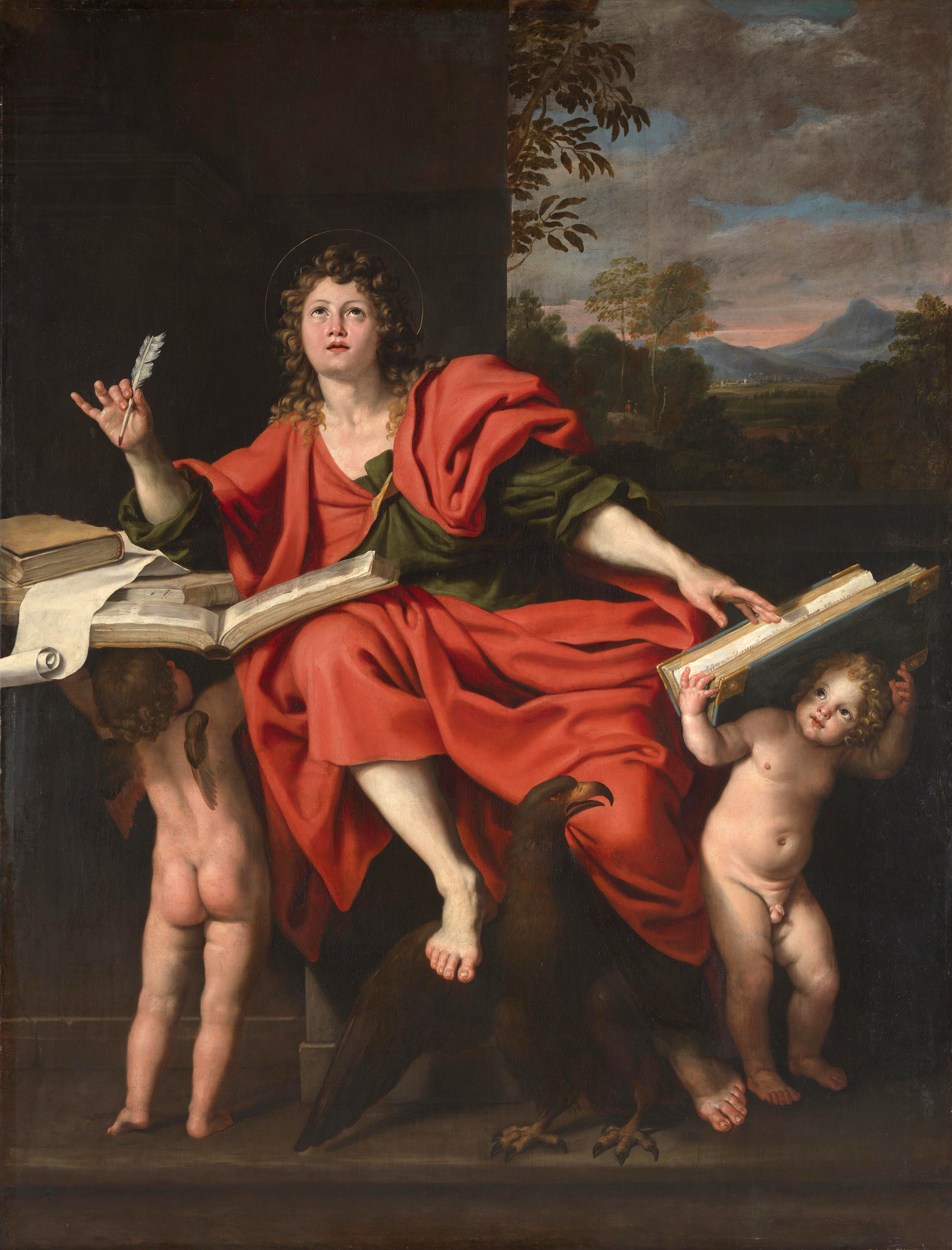
- Artist: Domenichino
- Year: c. 1621-1629
- Medium: Oil on canvas
- Dimensions: 259 cm × 199.4 cm (102 in × 78.5 in)
- Location: private collection

Saint John the Evangelist is a 1620s painting by the Italian Baroque painter Domenichino. In February 2014 it was on display in the National Gallery, London, on loan from a private collection.

== History ==
The painting is thought to have been commissioned by either Benedetto (1554–1621) or his brother Vincenzo Giustiniani (1564–1637) since it appears in the 1638 Giustiniani inventory. Paintings of Saints Matthew, Mark and Luke (by Nicolas Régnier, Francesco Albani and Guido Reni respectively) are also included, all stated to be the same size as the Saint John. It has been suggested therefore that the four paintings were originally intended as a series.

Despite the prestigious commission, the date of the painting's execution remains unclear. Richard E. Spear, author of numerous publications on 17th-century Italian painting and one of the foremost scholars on the life and work of Domenichino, put the work at around 1627 to 1629. This is due to stylistic similarities with works such as the Sant'Andrea della Valle's Saint John. An alternative theory, put forward in Squarzina's analysis of the 1938 Giustiniani inventory, speculates that the work could be from before 1621. Others have concluded dates between 1624 and 1628.

The painting descended via Vincenzo Giustiniani's heir to Prince Benedetto Giustiniani, in whose posthumous inventory of 1793 it appears, then to Andrea Giustiniani, who in 1804 declined a purchase offer of 6,500 scudi for it. Andrea then had it taken to Paris, probably before 1806, where he sold it to Alexis Delahante. Delahante and W. Harris then sold it to Richard Hart Davis and it was then sold in around 1813 with the rest of Davis's collection to Philip John Miles. Inherited firstly by his son, Sir William Miles, 1st Baronet then his grandson Sir Philip Miles, 2nd Baronet, the picture was kept at Leigh Court where it, along with others in the family's extensive collection, could be viewed upon application. The impact of the Long Depression and an agricultural crisis depressing farm prices due to cheap imports from abroad, however, simultaneously attacked this landowning and banking family's sources of income and caused Sir Philip to seek to sell in 1884 at Christie's where part of the collection was among the first to be sold under the terms of Gladstone's Settled Lands Act. However, Domenichino and his contemporaries had by then gone out of fashion with British buyers and the Saint John the Evangelist remained unsold.

It was then auctioned at Christie's again in 1899 on the death of Sir Cecil Miles, 3rd Baronet who was Philip Miles's great-grandson – this time it was bought in at 100 guineas and subsequently sold for 70 guineas to Martin Henry Colnaghi, acting as agent for Augustus Langham Christie of Tapeley Park, Devonshire and Glyndebourne, East Sussex, part of the Christie family. The painting passed down through that family (later headed by John Christie and known for their connection to the Glyndebourne Festival Opera) for more than a century until it was auctioned in London in December 2009 to an American buyer for £9.2 million. However, it was then the object of an export bar to keep it in the United Kingdom due to its history of ownership in the country. British galleries were unable to raise enough money to buy it (the National Gallery and National Galleries of Scotland already being committed to an expensive deal to buy Diana and Actaeon and Diana and Callisto, both by Titian), but another anonymous collector was allowed to acquire it on the condition that it be displayed to the public for three months each year. He then loaned it to the National Gallery in London from May 2010 to August 2011, where it had previously been displayed from 1992 to 1994.

== Description ==
Saint John the Evangelist is depicted as a young man accompanied by his traditional symbol the eagle and two putti. His gaze is directed upwards towards God as he receives the inspiration for his gospel, emphasised by the strong chiaroscuro light bearing down upon him. This was typical of the artist's style, continuing in the manner of late Raphael and his own master Annibale Carracci.

The composition is said to have been inspired by classical sculpture, with some commentators pointing specifically to The Laocoon. This is also evident in Domenichino's other large-scale treatments of the subject such as Madonna and Child with the Saints John the Evangelist and Petronius and the pendentive in the church of Sant'Andrea della Valle. The painting also includes an example of the artist's landscape painting, an aspect of his work that was particularly influential on the likes of Claude Lorrain and Nicolas Poussin. This element of the work was originally more compressed into the right-hand section of the canvas, the architecture taking precedence. However, Domenichino reconsidered this layout and over painted an extension of the landscape onto the wall. Other alterations are also visible in the books, the hand of the right putto and the larger hill of the landscape.

== Sources ==
- Zuffi, Stefano, Gospel Figures in Art, 2003. ISBN 0-89236-727-X.
- Art Daily, Domenichino Masterpiece to Be Offered at Christie's Auction of Old Masters and 19th Century Art, Art Daily, retrieved on 2009-11-14.
- Christie's, Domenico Zampieri, Il Domenichino (Bologna 1581-1641 Naples) | Saint John the Evangelist, Christie's, retrieved on 2009-11-14.
- Spear, R.E., Richard E. Spear Home Page, Richard E. Spear Home, retrieved on 2009-11-14.
