= Stoke Park, Bristol =

Park in Bristol, England

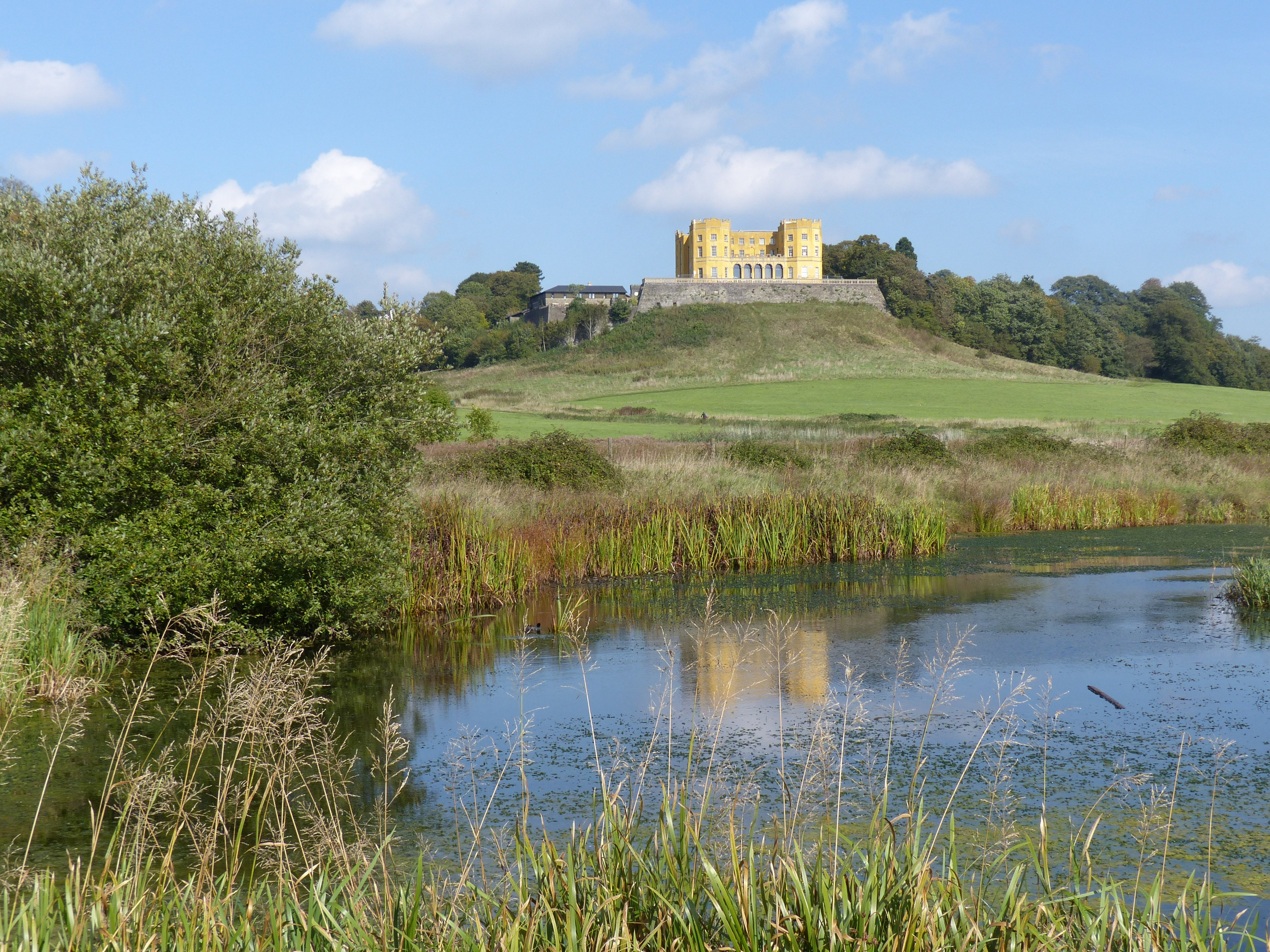
- Stoke Park and The Dower House, seen from Duchess Pond

- Location within Bristol
- Location: Bristol
- OS grid: ST 61590 77051
- Coordinates: 51.49109°N 2.55462°W
- Area: 108 hectares (270 acres)

Stoke Park is a public open space of 108 hectares (270 acres) in Bristol, England. It occupies a prominent position on the eastern flanks of Purdown, alongside the M32 motorway, together with the landmark Dower House and Purdown transmitter. Approximately 80% of the park is within the Bristol ward of Lockleaze; the remainder is within South Gloucestershire.

== The Dower House ==
The Dower House is one of Bristol's more prominent landmarks, set on a hill above the M32 motorway on the main approach into the city, and painted yellow. The house was built in 1553 by Sir Richard Berkeley. It has also been used as part of Stoke Park Hospital. The house closed as a hospital in 1985, and has been converted into flats.

== Duchess Pond ==
Within Stoke Park are two small lakes, the largest of which is Duchess Pond. It is used for angling and also supports breeding birds which are scarce elsewhere in Bristol, for example, reed warbler and reed bunting; in addition, an Egyptian goose was seen here in 2006 and a bittern in 2014.

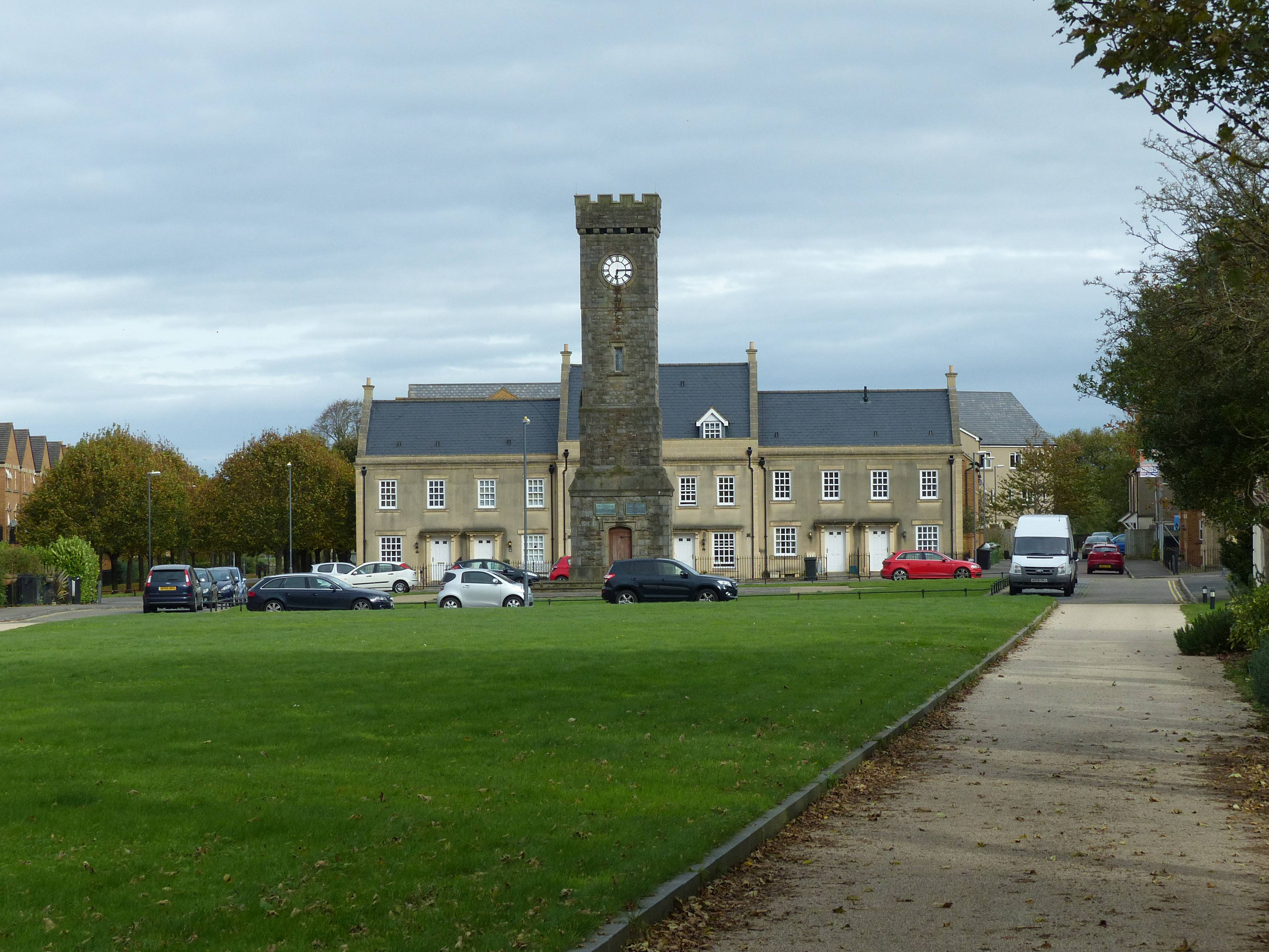
The clock tower was erected in Stoke Park in 1930, to commemorate the Rev Harold Nelson Burden who founded the Stoke Park Mental Colony

== Listed structures ==
Several aspects of the house and estate are listed. The house is Grade II* listed. The balustraded terrace, the Orangery, the remains of the obelisk, and the Broomhill Gate are all Grade II listed. The woods contain the Beaufort Memorial, the cold bath, a stone tunnel, and a partially derelict stone tunnel with rusticated entrance arches, all also Grade II listed.

== Other facilities ==
- Hermitage Tunnel
- Purdown BT Tower
- Woodland
- World War II gun emplacements on Purdown:

The site was first established in 1939 to hold mobile anti-aircraft guns, but was converted to a permanent concrete reinforced battery in June 1940. Manned by the Royal artillery regiment, the site included octagonal gun emplacements, integral ammunition bays and shelters with surrounding blast walls as well as a command post. Most of the structures survive and are still clearly observable.
