= Cabinet Office Briefing Rooms =

UK government facility for crisis meetings

Coordinates: 51.503°N 0.127°W

- Location: Cabinet Office, 70 Whitehall, London
- Country: United Kingdom
- Purpose: Crisis management centre

The Cabinet Office Briefing Rooms (COBR) are meeting rooms in the Cabinet Office in London. These rooms are used for committees which co-ordinate the actions of government bodies in response to national or regional crises, or during overseas events with major implications for the UK. It is sometimes referred to as COBRA by media sources, and is pronounced "cobra".

== The facility ==
The Cabinet Office Briefing Rooms are a group of meeting rooms in the Cabinet Office at 70 Whitehall in London, often used for different committees which co-ordinate the actions of bodies within the Government of the United Kingdom in response to instances of national or regional crisis, or during events abroad with major implications for the UK. It is often referred to as COBRA, although this is not an official term. The reason for the different titles is unclear; it may have been confused with other meeting rooms in the Cabinet Office which are not part of the COBR facility.

Unidentified COBR room as photographed in 2010

A single photo of one of the rooms in COBR was released in 2010 in response to a Freedom of Information Act request. In 2024 it was confirmed that this photograph remains valid, and that there have been no material changes to the layout.

An episode of the BBC's Newscast was recorded in the COBR facility by Adam Fleming and Chris Mason, where they interviewed Chancellor of the Duchy of Lancaster Pat McFadden to discuss a national test of the UK emergency alert system. The episode was released in July 2025.

== The committees ==
The composition of a Cobra meeting depends on the nature of the situation.

The Scientific Advisory Group for Emergencies (SAGE) is a sub-committee of COBR.

== The events ==
COBR meetings were created in the 1970s following the government's response to the 1972 miners' strike.

The first COBR meeting then took place during the Munich massacre in the summer of 1972.

Other events that have led to meetings being convened include the 1980 Iranian Embassy siege, the September 11 attacks, the July 2015 presence of migrants in and around Calais, the COVID-19 pandemic, and the 2024 United Kingdom riots.

It has most recently been convened in the immediate aftermath of a foiled terror attack involving explosives against RAF Fairford on 28 September 2026.

== Criticisms ==
In 2009, former senior police officer Andy Hayman, who sat on a committee after the 7 July 2005 London bombings and at other intervals from 2005 to 2007, was highly critical of its "cumbersome, bureaucratic and overly political" workings in his book The Terrorist Hunters.

== See also ==
- National Security Council
- Civil Contingencies Secretariat
- COBRA (British TV series)
- Scottish Government Resilience Room, the emergency management centre used by the Scottish Government in Scotland to co–ordinate response in Scotland
