= Two Women with a Candle =

Painting by Peter Paul Rubens

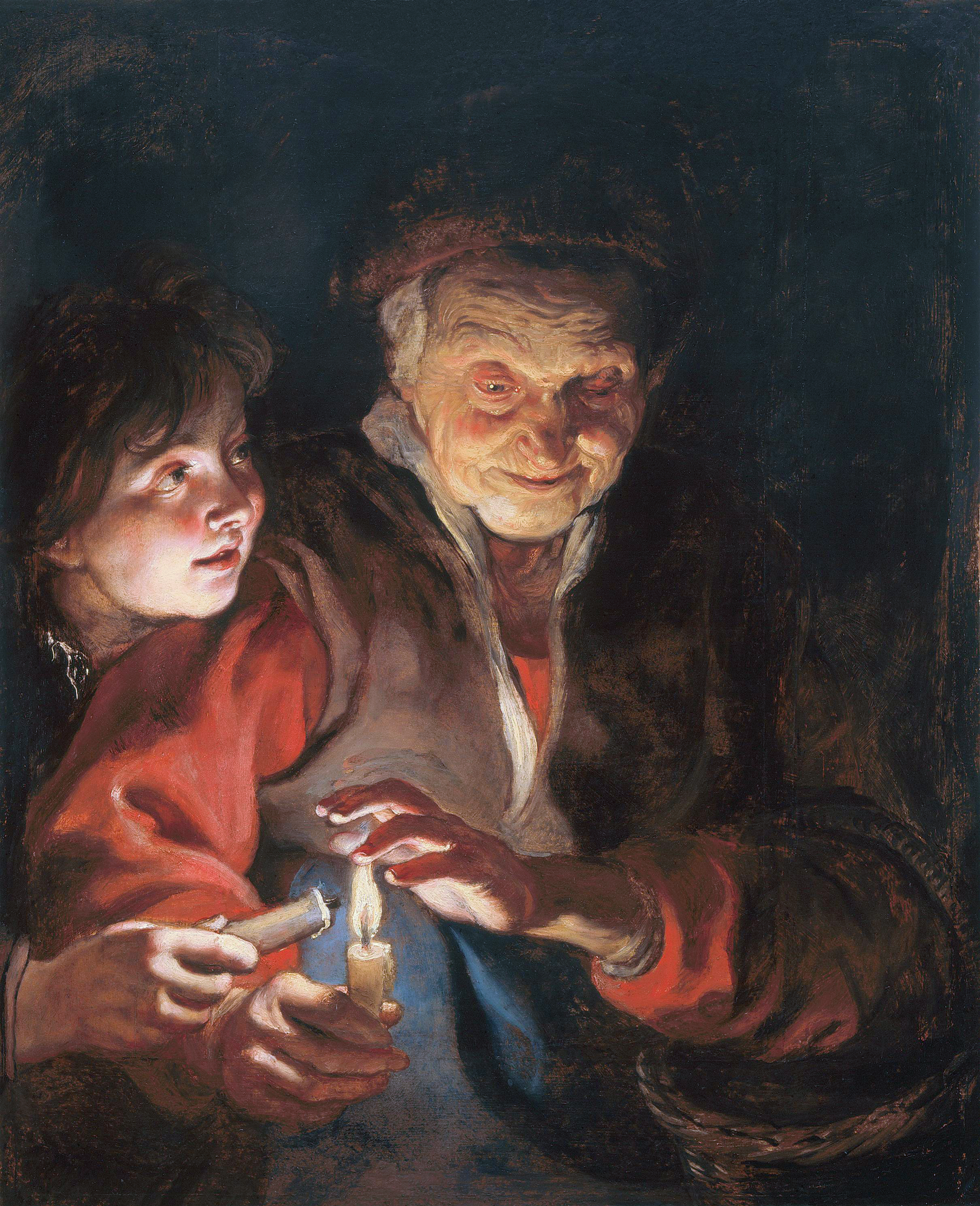
- Artist: Peter Paul Rubens
- Year: 1616-1617
- Medium: oil on panel
- Movement: Baroque
- Dimensions: 77 x 62.5 cm
- Location: Mauritshuis, The Hague

Two Women with a Candle or Old Woman and Young Woman with a Candle is a 1616-1617 painting by Peter Paul Rubens, now in the Mauritshuis, The Hague, Netherlands. Its chiaroscuro shows strong influence from Caravaggio, whose work Rubens had seen during a stay in Rome.

== History ==
It remained in the artist's possession until his death 1640 and it may then have passed to his brother-in-law Arnold Lundens. A painting owned by one Muhlmann in Riga in 1646 may also be identified with this painting. By 1801 the work had entered the collection of George Rogers, from whom it was acquired by Hastings Elwin, who retained it until 1806 - on 23 Mary that year it was sold in London for 950 guineas to Alexis Delahante. Delahante sold it on later that year for 2000 guineas to Charles Duncombe, 1st Baron Feversham.

It was passed down through the Duncombe family until it was sold in 1947 to Francis Francis of Bird Cay on the Bahamas - he then lent it to the Museum of Fine Arts, Boston. In 1965 it returned to London and on 30 June that year was sold at Sotheby's to the art dealer Agnew's for £19,000, who immediately resold it to a private collection. It was back in Sotheby's on 7 July 2004, when it was sold to Otto Naumann Limited of New York for £2.5 million. That dealer resold it the following year to its present owners with contributions from the BankGiro Loterij, the Stichting Vrienden van het Mauritshuis, the Mondriaan Stichting, the Vereniging Rembrandt (partly thanks to the Prins Bernhard Cultuurfonds) and the legacy of Miss A.A.W. Schröder.

== Sources ==
- http://www.mauritshuis.nl/nl-nl/verdiep/de-collectie/kunstwerken/oude-vrouw-en-jongen-met-kaarsen-1150/
