= Holy Trinity Church, Abbots Leigh =

Church in Somerset, England

Holy Trinity Church
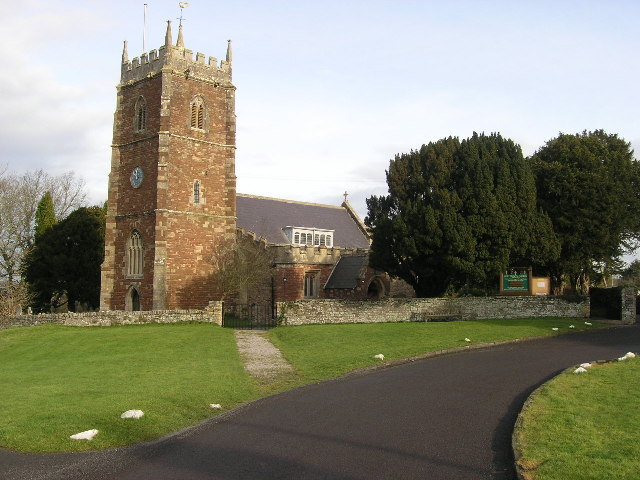

- Location within Somerset
- 51.4633°N 2.6572°W -->
- Location: Abbots Leigh, Somerset, England

Listed Building – Grade II*
- Official name: Holy Trinity Church
- Designated: 11 October 1961
- Reference no.: 1312353

Holy Trinity Church in Abbots Leigh within the English county of Somerset is a 15th-century Perpendicular Gothic building, restored and partially rebuilt in 1847–48 after a fire. It is a Grade II* listed building.

== History ==
The site of the church may have been occupied by a small chapel or Saxon hermitage. Parts of the present building may be remnants of a 13th-century structure.

In 1848 the church was damaged by fire and much of the building had to be rebuilt; however the tower and chancel remain from the original.

The parish and benefice of Abbots Leigh with Leigh Woods is within the Diocese of Bristol.

== Architecture ==
The stone building has a slate roof to the nave. There are north and south aisles, a chancel with a ribbed roof, south porch and vestry.

The three-stage west tower is supported by diagonal buttresses and topped by an embattled parapet. The tower has six bells, three of which were cast in 1781 by William Bilbie of the Bilbie family.

Within the church are various monuments and memorials including one to Sir George Norton of Leigh Court.

In the churchyard is a late medieval octagonal cross.
