= Finzels Reach =

Development site in Bristol, England

Coordinates: 51.454°N 2.589°W

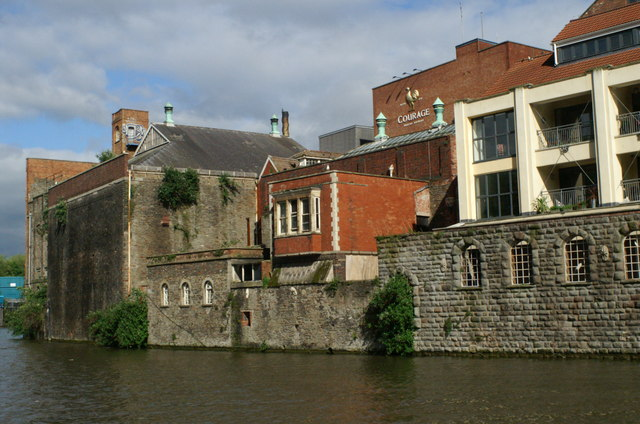
The site in 2006

Finzels Reach is a 4.7-acre (1.9 ha) mixed use development site located in central Bristol, England, on a former industrial site, which occupies most of the south bank of Bristol Floating Harbour between Bristol Bridge and St Philip's Bridge, across the river from Castle Park.

A sugar refinery occupied part of the site from 1681, rebuilt by Conrad Finzel I in 1846 to become one of the largest sugar refineries in England. Known as Finzel's Sugar Refinery, it operated until 1881. Georges Bristol Brewery, founded in 1788, grew to occupy most of the site by the mid 20th century, when it was the largest brewery in southwest England. Known after 1961 as the Courage Brewery, it operated until 1999. The site also includes the former Tramway Generating Station, a Grade II* listed building built in 1899 which operated as the power station for Bristol Tramways until 1941.

Development plans were approved in 2006, but work was halted in 2011 due to financial issues with the developer, HDG Mansur, following the 2008 recession and the site was subsequently put on the market in 2013, after the company went into receivership. The development was revived when the developer, Cubex, bought the site in 2014. The development was completed in June of 2024.

== History ==
=== Sugar refinery ===
The original Counterslip Sugar House was founded in 1681, in the northeast part of the site. German-born Conrad Finzel I (1793–1859) acquired the refinery in 1839. After it burnt down in 1846 he rebuilt it. Finzel's Sugar Refinery, one of the largest in England, employed over 700 workers. After Finzel's death in 1859, his family including Conrad Finzel II (1818–1903) kept Finzel & Sons going until 1877. A group of local businessmen briefly took over the refinery, but finally closed ‌it in 1881.

=== Brewery ===
Brewing originated at the western end of the site, where in 1788 the Porter Brewery on Bath Street was acquired by a consortium which became the Philip George Bristol Porter and Beer Company. In 1796 the company built a pale ale brewery next to the porter one. In 1861 the company became Georges and Company, and became a public company in 1888. By the early 20th century the Georges Bristol Brewery employed around 170 workers. In 1919 and 1924 more land along Bath Street and Counterslip Street was acquired and by 1933 the brewery developed into a 3-acre (1.2 ha) complex, the largest brewery in south west England. After absorbing its local rivals, the company became the dominant brewer in Bristol, but in 1961 it was taken over by Courage, Barclay & Simonds and was renamed Courage (Western). After Courage itself subsequently passed through various owners, the brewery was closed in October 1991 by Scottish & Newcastle.

=== Generating station ===
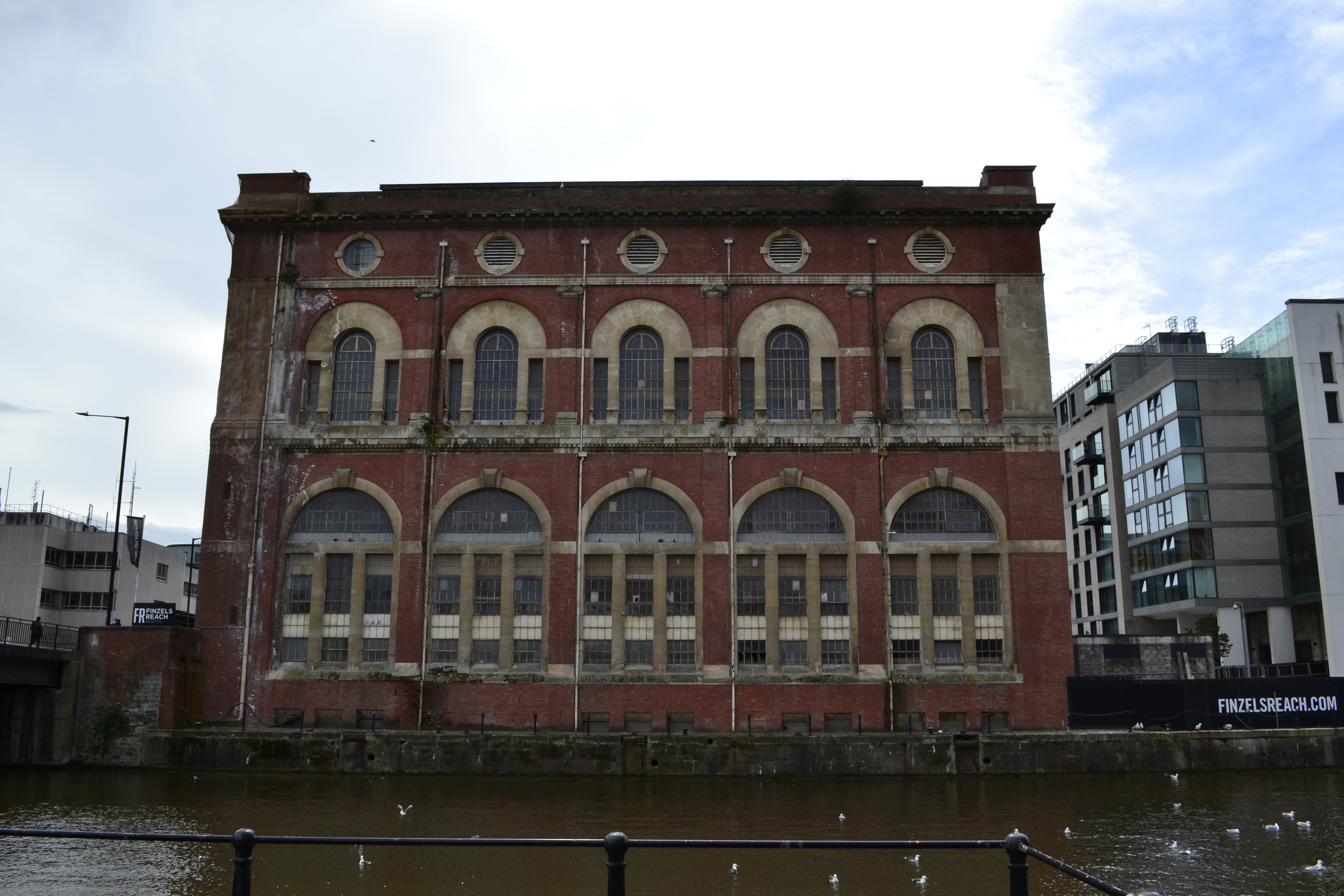
The generating station in 2015

The generating station is at the eastern end of the site, next to St Philip's Bridge. It was built in 1899 for the Bristol Tramways and Carriage Company by the architect William Curtis Green. The eventual demise of Bristol's tramways came on Good Friday 1941 during the Bristol Blitz, when bombs falling on St Philip's Bridge cut the power to the whole tramway system. The generating station was subsequently converted into offices. It is a Grade II* listed building.

== Development ==
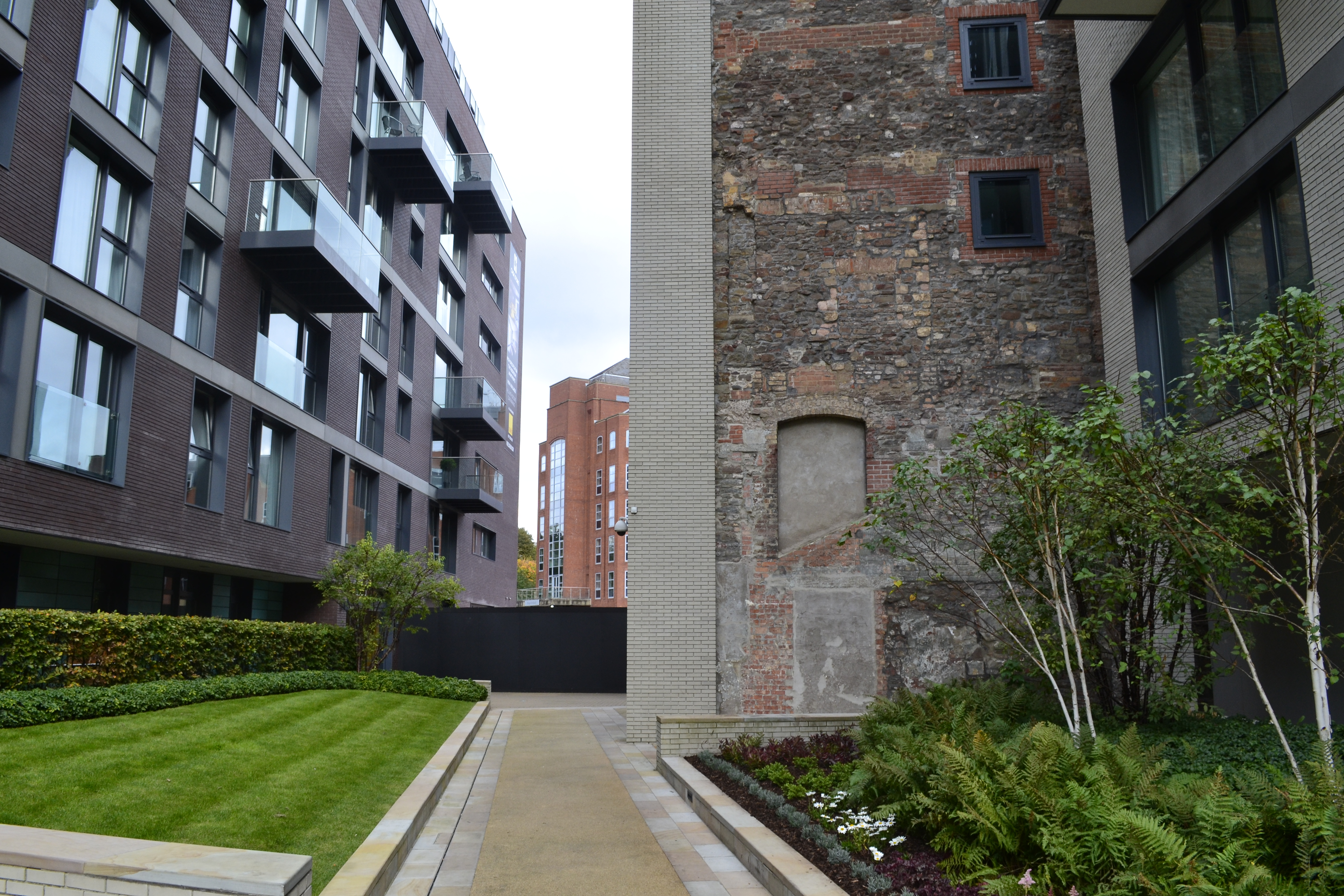
A view of the development in 2015

The £250 million development includes a new footbridge over the Floating Harbour, 168 bed hotel, 420 apartments, offices, shops, restaurants and bars. The previous design for a footbridge had a different alignment and had planning permission given as part of the original Finzels Reach development. A new design by Bristol-based Architects The Bush Consultancy was submitted by Finzels Reach Property LLP for a 4.5m wide curved pedestrian and cycle bridge. The proposals were approved in March 2015 despite many objections due to the obstruction of the waterway from people using the harbour, and links Castle Park to Finzels Reach. The bridge has a height difference of 7.2 metres (24 ft) between the Castle Park end and the Finzels Reach site and is 91 metres (299 ft) long. In November 2014, a deal was signed between Cubex and Palmer Capital with Premier Inn for a 168 bedroom hotel located in the southern part of the site. In May 2016, planning consent was granted by Bristol City Council for an 11-storey apartment block located in Hawkins Lane and another apartment building located on the north east corner of the site along the Floating Harbour. The two buildings will contain 194 one and two bedroom apartments and will be the final phase of residential development on the site. Willmott Dixon was appointed in late 2016 by Cubex to build the final residential development for the Finzels Reach site with construction starting in February 2017. The development was completed in June of 2024.

=== Bridgewater House ===
Completed in 2013, Bridgewater House is a Grade A BREEAM excellent-rated office building located in the southern part of the Finzels Reach site. As of Spring 2016, the 115,000 square feet (10,700 m^{2}) office building is let to Barclays Wealth and BDO.

=== Aurora ===
In September 2015, planning permission was given by Bristol City Council to build a seven-storey 95,000 square feet (8,800 m^{2}) Grade A office building designed by Bristol-based Architects The Bush Consultancy. In late 2015, Willmott Dixon was announced as the preferred bidder to construct the Aurora office building and construction was expected to start in 2016 and be completed by late 2017.

=== Generator Building ===
The Generator Building is a redevelopment of the former Tramways Generating Station into 27,000 square feet (2,500 m^{2}) of office accommodation. Work was expected to start in 2018. These plans supersede the original ones to create 30 studio flats, under the name Generator House.

=== The Wellhead ===
Development of the Wellhead cocktail bar was completed in late 2020. Located by Castle Bridge, the building was originally the water source for the brewery.

=== Castle Bridge ===
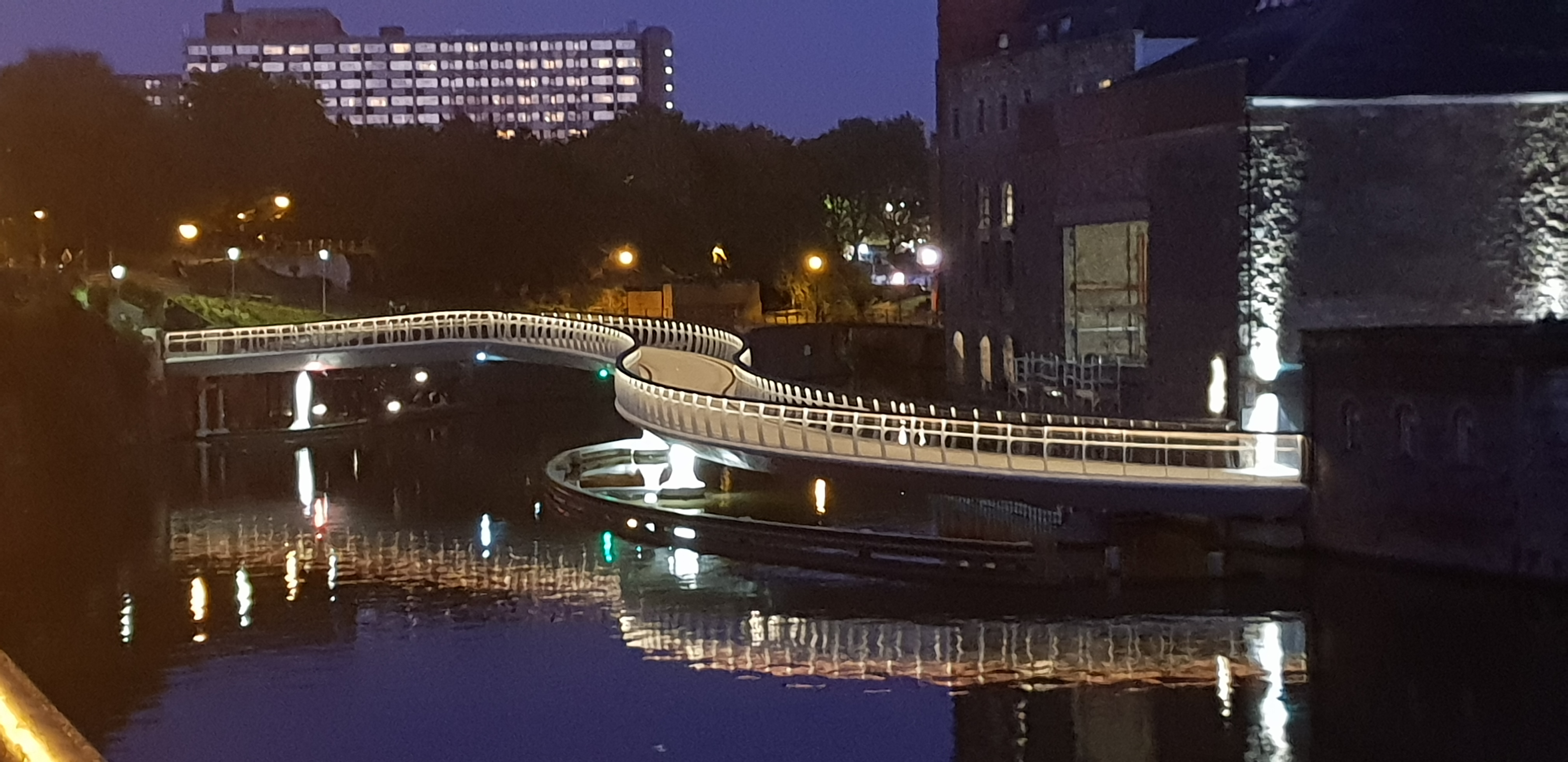
Castle Bridge at night

In March 2016, Bristol City Council approved plans for an S-shaped footbridge over the Floating Harbour, linking the development to Castle Park, despite its design obstructing navigation in the harbour and concerns that it would be visually intrusive. The bridge cost £2.7 million and was opened on 6 April 2017.

Castle Bridge is one of the primary pedestrian routes set out by the City Council as part of their wider assessment of access to the city centre. It is said to complete an attractive 'walkway from Temple Mead to Castle Park and the retail areas of Cabot Circus'; however, it does not run in that direction and would require a 400-metre diversion from that route. It has marginally improved access to the popular ferry services on the north of the Floating Harbour for pedestrians coming from the south-west. Its unusually sinuous shape was designed to allow the minimum gradient on the bridge between either side of the Floating Harbour. Made from a series of unique curved steel sections, it is topped with timber decking, sculptured cladding and feature lighting. The 91-metre Castle Bridge adds an entirely new dimension to the Finzels Reach project, providing easy access to the north of the Floating Harbour. It twists its way gracefully across the historic waterway, landing in Castle Park from where Cabot Circus and the MetroBus route are a short walk away.

== See also ==
- Bristol city centre
- Architecture of Bristol
- Clevedon Hall, Conrad Finzel's residence in Clevedon, Somerset
