= The Terrorist Hunters =

2009 non-fiction book by Andy Hayman and Margaret Gilmore

- The front cover of The Terrorist Hunters
- Author: Andy Hayman
- Language: English
- Genre: Autobiography
- Publisher: Bantam Press
- Publication date: July 2009
- Publication place: United Kingdom
- Pages: 334
- ISBN: 978-0-593-06586-0

The Terrorist Hunters (published 2009) is a controversial non-fiction book by former senior police officer Andy Hayman, co-written by Margaret Gilmore, about Hayman's role as head of the Metropolitan Police's Specialist Operations Division. The Attorney General for England and Wales, Baroness Scotland QC, sought, and initially won, a High Court injunction against the publication of the book. The book was reported to have sold 2,500 pre-order copies before the injunction was issued.

== Narrative ==
The primary focus of The Terrorist Hunters is on the aftermath of the 7 July 2005 London bombings and the investigation it sparked as well as the role of the UK's security services, particularly the Met and MI5 in combating terrorism in the years after the attacks, though it also covers the investigation into the murder of Alexander Litvinenko.

The Terrorist Hunters is highly critical of the government's emergency committee, known as COBR (aka COBRA), of which Hayman was often a member. Hayman describes COBRA in the book and in interviews with The Times as "cumbersome, bureaucratic and overly political."

Hayman also discusses Sir Ian Blair, former Met Commissioner, whom he described as a friend but of whom he later became highly critical in relation to a statement by the commissioner regarding the shooting of Jean Charles de Menezes, a Brazilian national who was mistakenly shot dead by CO19 officers on the London Underground after being misidentified as a suicide bomber the day after the failed 21 July 2005 London bombings. He also questions whether his role and the role of other intelligence and emergency service officials attending the meetings were taken seriously enough and recalls an exchange with Patricia Hewitt, then Secretary of State for Health, during a COBRA meeting in the immediate aftermath of the 7 July bombings, about the number of scenes at which the bombers had struck.

The Terrorist Hunters goes on to deal with events in 2007, when an attack was launched on Glasgow International Airport on the same day as two attempted car bombings in London. Hayman praises Strathclyde Police for their cooperation in the subsequent investigations, though is critical of Alex Salmond, then Scottish First Minister and leader of the Scottish National Party, accusing Salmond of waging a "turf war" over control of the Glasgow suspects in "some amazing playground antics", a claim which was strongly denied by Salmond and the SNP.

Within the book, Hayman also calls for an official public inquiry into the events of 7 July 2005.

== Injunction ==
On 1 July 2009, the English High Court issued a temporary injunction against the sale of The Terrorist Hunters after a hearing requested by Baroness Scotland QC, the Attorney General. The reason given for the injunction was "legal reasons relating to ongoing criminal proceedings", the Crown Prosecution Service fearing a passage in the book might influence jury members of a pending trial. When the injunction ran out the book returned to sale unedited and a paperback edition was published in October 2009.

== Publication ==
Prior to its release, copies of The Terrorist Hunters were provided to the Cabinet Office, MI5, MI6 and the Crown Prosecution Service for approval, prompting Met Commissioner Sir Paul Stephenson to suggest the Metropolitan Police Authority, the force's governing body, review whether senior officers should be allowed to publish such books in the future. The book, published by Bantam Press, was serialised in The Times prior to its release.
