= Dower house =

UK term for a large house available to an estate owner's widow

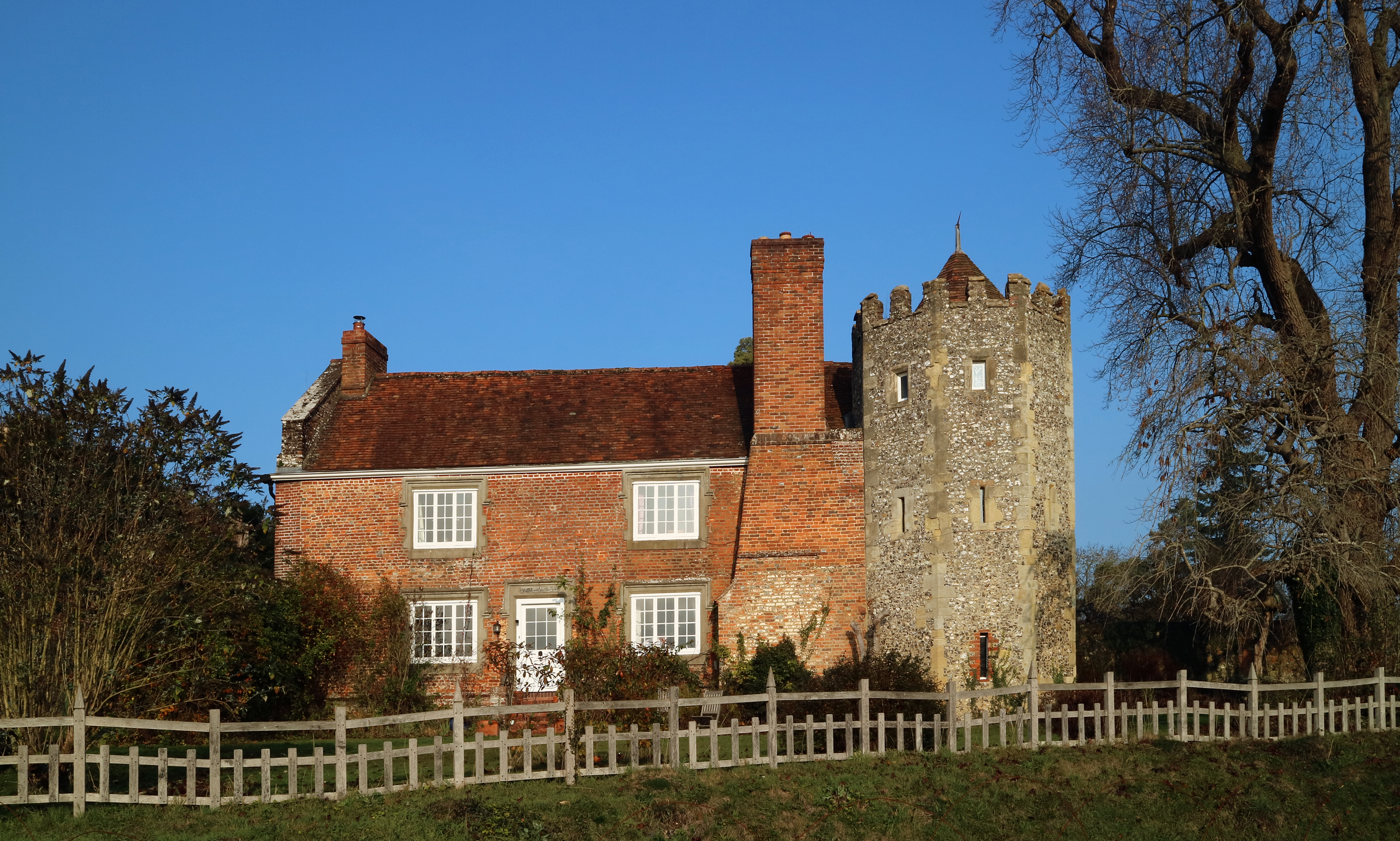
The Dower House at Greys Court, Oxfordshire

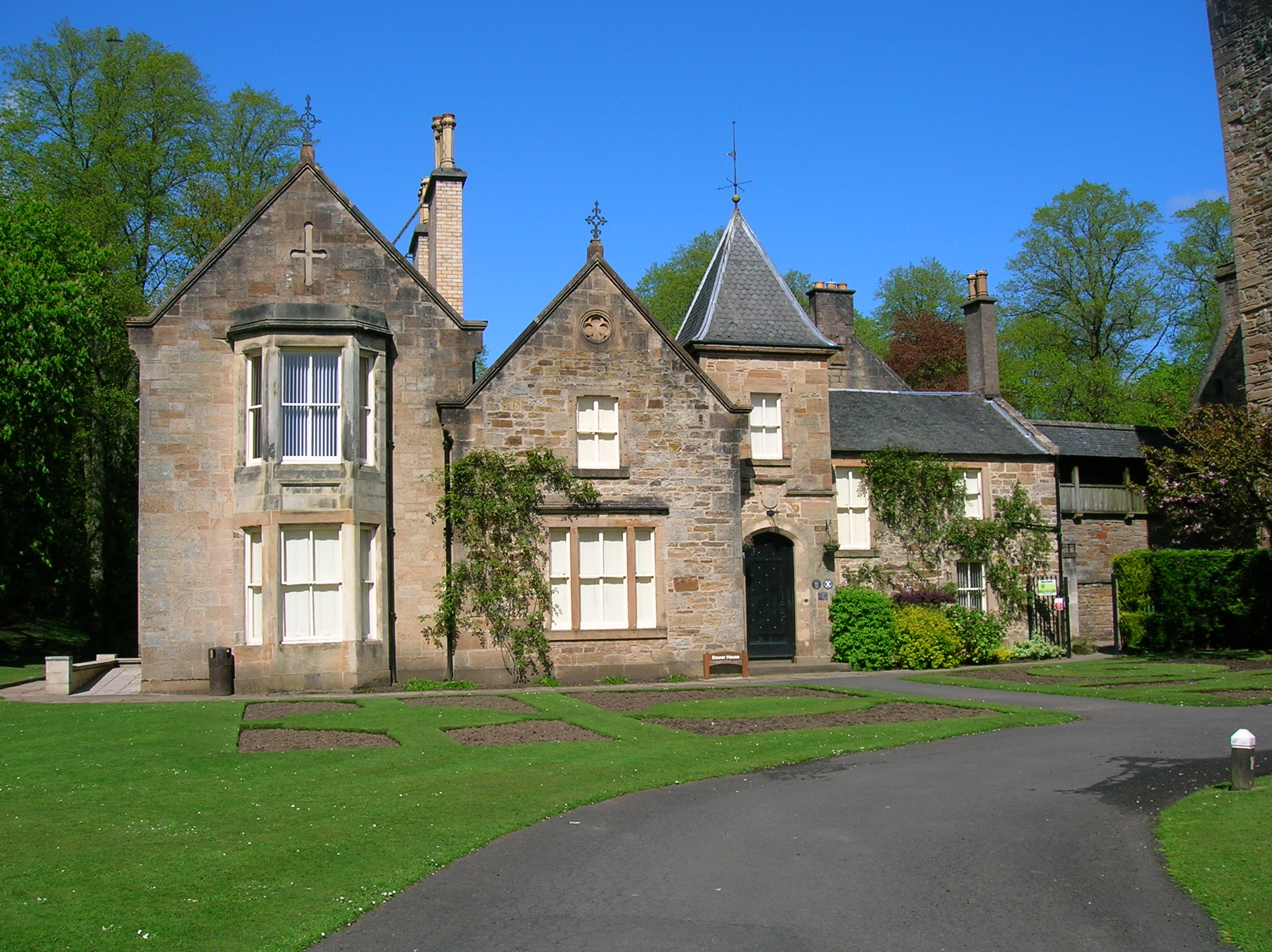
The Dower House at Dean Castle in Kilmarnock, Ayrshire

A dower house is usually a moderately large house available for use by the widow of the previous owner of an English, Scottish, Welsh or Irish estate. The widow, often known as the "dowager", usually moves into the dower house from the larger family house on the death of her husband if the heir is married, and upon his marriage if he was single at his succession. The new heir then occupies the vacated principal house.

The dower house might also be occupied by an elder son after his marriage, or simply rented to a tenant.

== Examples ==
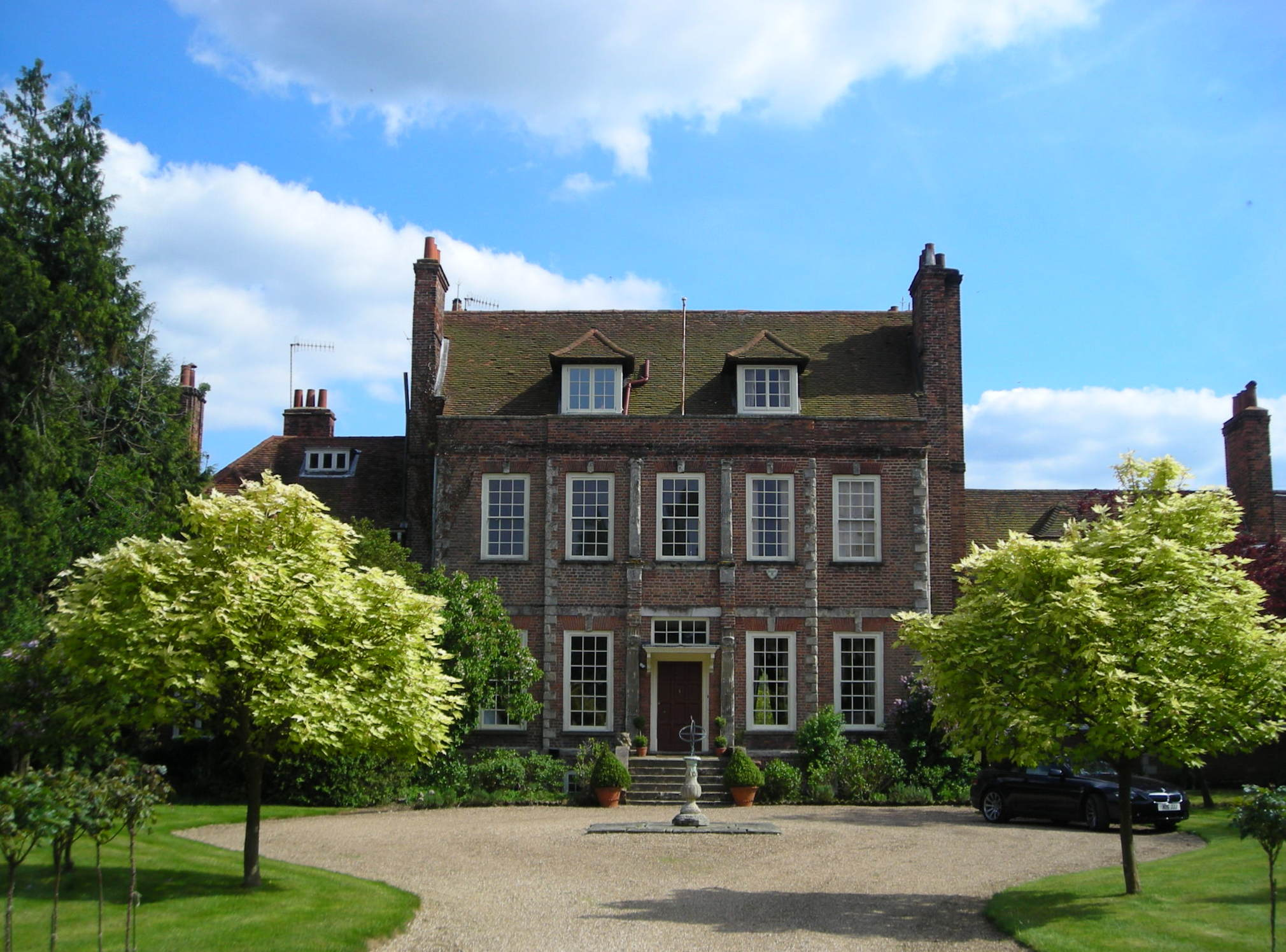
Byfleet Manor

The British royal family maintains a dower house in London as well as one in the country. Well-known royal dower-houses in London have included Clarence House, Marlborough House, and (for a time during the 18th century) Buckingham Palace (then known as "Buckingham House"). Frogmore House has served as Windsor Castle's dower house.

The Dukes of Devonshire kept Hardwick Hall in Derbyshire as a dower house from time to time after the 1st Duke moved the family seat to nearby Chatsworth House. It was being so used by the widow of the 9th Duke when it was transferred to the National Trust in satisfaction of death duties upon the unexpected death of the 10th Duke in 1950.

Byfleet Manor in Surrey served as the filming location of the dower house in the ITV series Downton Abbey.

== See also ==
- The Dower House, Stoke Park
