= Abbots Leigh =

Village in Somerset, England

Coordinates: 51.4607°N 2.6564°W

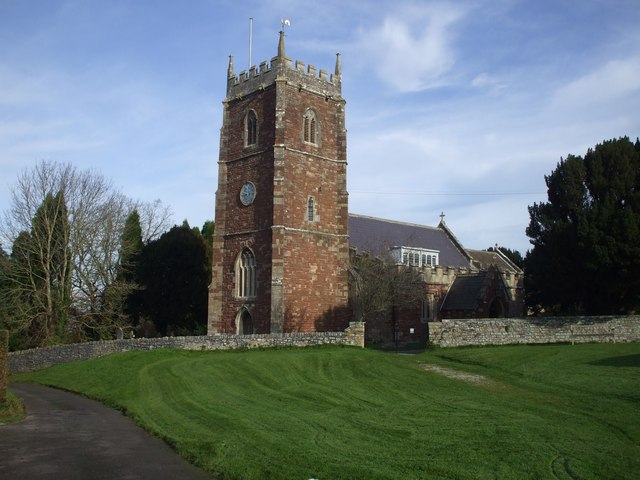
- Holy Trinity parish church

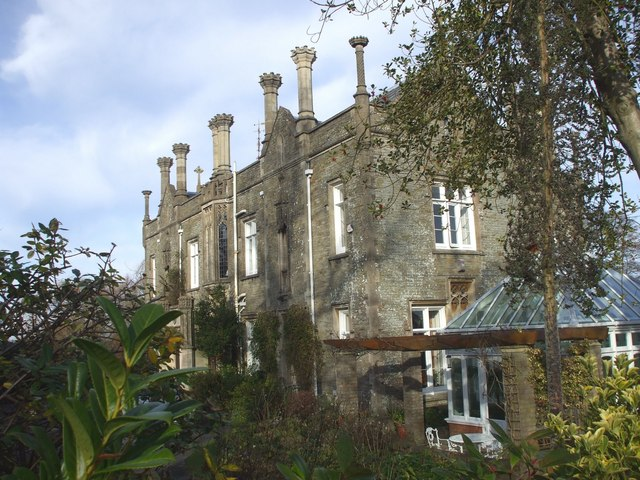
- The Priory

- Location within Somerset
- Population: 799 (2011)
- OS grid reference: ST545735
- Civil parish: Abbot's Leigh
- Unitary authority: North Somerset
- Ceremonial county: Somerset
- Region: South West
- Country: England
- Sovereign state: United Kingdom
- Post town: Bristol
- Postcode district: BS8
- Dialling code: 01275
- Police: Avon and Somerset
- Fire: Avon
- Ambulance: South Western
- UK Parliament: North Somerset
- Website: Abbots Leigh web site

Abbots Leigh is a village and civil parish in North Somerset, England, about 3 miles (5 km) west of the centre of Bristol.

== History ==
The original Middle English name was Lega, and the village became Abbots Leigh in the mid-12th century when Robert Fitzharding (1st Earl of Berkeley) purchased the manor, having been rewarded as Lord of the manor of Portbury by the king. He also purchased Bedminster, Hareclive and Billeswick manors. He went on to found the Abbey of St Augustine at what was Billeswick, and bequeathed the income from the parish to support the abbey. Because of this connection to the abbey, when the Diocese of Bristol was carved out of the Bath and Wells, Gloucester and Worcester diocesan territories (Patent Roll, Henry VIII, Art. 9, June 1542) the new diocese's boundary was drawn to include the parish, including the Saxon enclosure at Hamgreen which had been part of Portbury manor lands until then. All the surrounding parishes in Somerset are in Bath and Wells diocese. The parish map shows this meandering historic boundary which puts St Katherine's School and Chapel Pill Farm both within the parish.

The parish of Abbots Leigh was part of the Portbury Hundred.

The manor house here, also named Abbot's Leigh or Leigh Court, was a resting place of Charles II during his escape to France in 1651. He arrived on the evening of 12 September, and stayed at the home of Mr and Mrs George Norton, who were friends of the King's travelling companion, Jane Lane. The Nortons were unaware of the King's identity during his three-day stay.

A description of the house appears in the book The Escape of Charles II, After the Battle of Worcester by Richard Ollard: Watercolour images of Abbot's Leigh House

"Abbots Leigh was the most magnificent of all the houses in which Charles was sheltered during his escape. A drawing made in 1788, only twenty years before it was pulled down, shows a main front of twelve gables, surmounting three storeys of cowled windows; a comfortable, solid west country Elizabethan house."

While staying at Abbots Leigh, Charles deflected suspicion by asking a trooper, who had been in the King's personal guard, to describe the King's appearance and clothing at the Battle of Worcester. The man looked at Charles and said, "The King was at least three inches taller than you."

The King's escape route is commemorated in the Monarch's Way long-distance footpath which passes through the village.

== Hymn tune ==
In 1942, during World War II, Rev. Cyril Vincent Taylor (1907–1991), then a producer of Religious Broadcasting at the BBC and stationed in the village, wrote a hymn tune which he named after it. The tune was originally written for the hymn "Glorious Things of Thee Are Spoken". This hymn had usually been sung to the tune "Austrian Hymn", or Gott erhalte Franz den Kaiser, but since the national anthem of then-enemy Germany was also sung to that tune, new music was needed in wartime Britain. Other hymn texts now commonly sung to the same tune include "Father Lord of All Creation", "God is Here", "God is Love, Let Heaven Adore Him", and "Lord, You Give the Great Commission".

== Governance ==
The parish is in the unitary authority of North Somerset which was created in 1996, under the Local Government Act 1992. It provides a single tier of local government with responsibility for almost all local government functions within its area, including local planning and building control, local roads, council housing, environmental health, markets and fairs, refuse collection, recycling, cemeteries, crematoria, leisure services, parks, and tourism. It is also responsible for education, social services, libraries, main roads, public transport, Trading Standards, waste disposal and strategic planning, although fire, police and ambulance services are provided jointly with other authorities through the Avon Fire and Rescue Service, Avon and Somerset Constabulary and the South Western Ambulance Service.

North Somerset's area covers part of the ceremonial county of Somerset but it is administered independently of the non-metropolitan county. Its administrative headquarters is in the town hall in Weston-super-Mare. Between 1 April 1974 and 1 April 1996, it was the Woodspring district of the county of Avon. Before 1974 that the parish was part of the Long Ashton Rural District.

The parish is represented in the House of Commons as part of the North Somerset county constituency, which elects one MP, currently Sadik Al-Hassan of the Labour Party.

== Parish church ==
The Church of England parish church of the Holy Trinity is a 15th-century Perpendicular Gothic building, restored and partially rebuilt in 1847–48 after a fire. The tower has six bells, three of which were cast in 1781 by William Bilbie of the Bilbie family. English Heritage has designated Holy Trinity a Grade II* listed building.
