= Margaret Gilmore =

British journalist, broadcaster, writer and analyst

- Born: 9 February 1956 (age 70); Zululand, South Africa
- Education: St Brandon's School; North London Collegiate School; Westfield College, fmr. part of University of London
- Occupations: Analyst, broadcaster, writer
- Employer: Royal United Services Institute
- Known for: Deputy Chair, HFEA, Asst Commissioner, Boundary Commission for England, Board Member, Food Standards Agency (2007-14), Senior Defence Analyst (2007–present); BBC Home and Legal Affairs Correspondent (2000–2007); BBC Environment Correspondent (1997–2000)

Margaret Gilmore (born 9 February 1956) is a journalist, broadcaster, writer and analyst. She frequently broadcasts, writes and lectures on security issues and is a senior associate fellow with the lead UK security think tank Royal United Services Institute. Formerly a senior BBC correspondent covering terrorism, she now also sits on public service boards in the UK. She is deputy chair of the HFEA; assistant commissioner, Boundary Commission for England; board member Food Standards Agency (2007–14).

== Early life ==
Gilmore was born on 9 February 1956 in Zululand in South Africa.

== Education ==
From 1965 to 1972, Gilmore was educated at St Brandon's School, a former junior and senior boarding independent school for girls in the town of Clevedon in Somerset, followed by North London Collegiate School (1972–74), an independent school for girls in Edgware in North London. She then studied at Westfield College, now part of Queen Mary University of London, from 1974 to 1977, where she obtained a BA Honours Degree in English.

== Life and career ==
Gilmore began her career as a journalist in 1977 reporting for local newspapers in London. She moved into radio working for local stations in Ipswich and Bristol and then Independent Radio News. She joined the BBC in 1985 as a reporter based in Northern Ireland. From there she moved to Breakfast News, and then BBC 2's Newsnight, where she specialised in Irish Affairs.

Gilmore worked for Thames Television's This Week between 1989 and 1993 where she covered a wide range of subjects filming all over the world. While with This Week, she made the first western documentary on the Lebanon hostage crisis while the hostages were still in captivity, and was the first western reporter allowed into East Germany after the resignation of Eric Honecker. She witnessed the fall of the Berlin Wall. Her two-part special on the American mafia reached record audiences of nearly nine million people. Gilmore returned to the BBC as a reporter on Panorama in 1993, where her programmes included "A Crime Unpunished" (on race and the law) and "Babies on Benefit". She has also travelled extensively for the BBC's Assignment programme.

As a BBC News Correspondent, Gilmore covered the Newbury Bypass protests. In 1997 she became the Environment Correspondent for BBC Television News, winning the top environment award – a BEMA, as Television Environment Journalist of the Year – for her work on global warming, and the developing BSE and CJD crisis. She was appointed as Home and Legal Affairs Correspondent for BBC Television News in January 2000. In her role as home and legal affairs correspondent for BBC Television News, Gilmore's brief included terrorism and homeland security, policing, asylum, crime and race relations. Most recently, she has reported on the aftermath of the 7 July 2005 London bombings, the new UK terrorism legislation and the proposed introduction of ID cards. She left the BBC at the height of her career to pursue a wider range of activities. She was elected to the board of the Food Standards Agency where she has served for six years as a non-executive director and chair of its risk committee.

In 2007, Gilmore left BBC News, reportedly taking redundancy during a BBC cost-cutting exercise. She said she had "been privileged to work for BBC news, which I believe is the best in the world", whilst the BBC head of newsgathering, Fran Unsworth, said Gilmore had "a long and distinguished career with the BBC and her energy and commitment to the job will be much missed". Gilmore joined the Royal United Services Institute security think tank, where she continues to write and associate with high level contacts in security and intelligence. For six years, a Research Fellow, she later became a Senior Associate Fellow. She co-wrote the book The Terrorist Hunters whose release was temporarily blocked by an injunction sought by Baroness Scotland QC, but published soon afterwards. She continues to write, broadcast and speak on security and intelligence, media and environment issues. She is also an avid supporter of Reading Football Club.

== Family ==
Gilmore is married to Eamonn Matthews, a producer of current affairs programmes and managing director of the independent TV production company Quicksilver Media. The couple have one son.
