= St Brandon's School =

Coordinates: 51°26′14″N 2°51′51″W

St Brandon's School was an independent school incorporating an infant and junior school and a senior boarding school for girls, located in the town of Clevedon in Somerset, in South West England. The school was opened in 1831 and closed in 2004.

== History ==
The school was founded in 1830 by Reverend Holmes, minister of Christ Church in Gloucester, and Miss Abraham, as the Clergy Daughters' School, opening in Gloucester in 1831. In 1833, the school moved '..to a house on the Royal Fort site', and in 1862 to Great George Street on St Brandon's Hill in Bristol, in premises for which the architect was William Venn Gough. The name of the school was changed to St Brandon's Clergy Daughters' School after its location in 1904 to distinguish it from other Clergy Daughters' Schools at Brighton, Casterton and Darley Dale, and this was shortened to St Brandon's School in the 1930s. A junior department was opened in Henbury in 1933, and plans were made to move the senior school there. During World War II, the school was evacuated to the Bishop's Palace in Wells. In 1945, it bought and moved to Clevedon Hall, where it remained until 1991. It erected some additional school buildings in the grounds, including a new wing which was opened by the Duchess of Gloucester in 1958.

The school had financial difficulties, with debts of about £1 million, in late 1990, and the senior school was closed in July 1991. The infant and junior schools were sold in 1992 and continued as coeducational institutions in lower grounds of the Clevedon Hall estate. St Brandon's School was closed in 2004,

=== Accident ===
In the Burns' Day storm in 1990, a conservatory collapsed, and a pupil was killed and four, or possibly five, others injured.

== Notable former pupils ==
- Jenny Barraclough
- Monica Edwards
- Margaret Gilmore
- Sue Hamilton
- Daphne Pearson
