= Leigh Court =

Grade II listed building in Somerset, UK

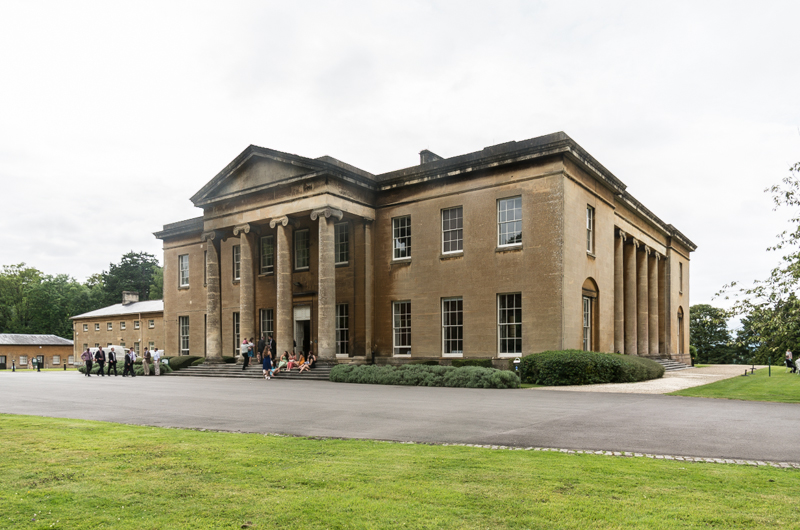
- Leigh Court. The north east front in 2014

General information
- Type: English country house
- Architectural style: Palladian
- Location: Abbots Leigh, Somerset
- Coordinates: 51°28′11″N 2°39′33″W
- Construction started: 1812 (1558 for the Tudor house)
- Completed: 1814
- Demolished: 1812 (Tudor house)

Technical details
- Floor count: 4 (plus mezzanine on one side)

Design and construction
- Architect: Thomas Hopper

Leigh Court is a country house which is a Grade II* listed building in Abbots Leigh, Somerset, England. The grounds and park are listed, Grade II, on the Register of Historic Parks and Gardens of special historic interest in England.

The site was a house of rest for the monks of St Augustine's Abbey, which became Bristol Cathedral. After the dissolution of the monasteries it was granted to Sir George Norton who built an Elizabethan mansion. One of his descendants gave sanctuary to Charles II during his escape to France in 1651. The original house was demolished and rebuilt in the Regency period by Philip John Miles and became the seat of the Miles baronets. The mansion housed a collection of over a hundred paintings representing many Old Masters. In common with many country houses after the First World War, it entered a period of institutional use in 1919 under Rev Harold Nelson Burden (1859–1930) as a psychiatric hospital but was subsequently restored. The estate now offers office accommodation, conference and meeting rooms, and the house has a licence as a venue for civil wedding services.

The Palladian house has a Greek Revival interior which has largely survived the various uses of the building. The grounds were originally landscaped by Humphrey Repton; part of them is now within the Leigh Woods National Nature Reserve. An organic farm has also been established based on the walled garden.

== History ==
=== Original building ===
The manor of Leigh at the time of the Norman Conquest belonged to the lordship of Bedminster but William the Conqueror awarded it to the Bishop of Coutances. The manor house was given in 1118 by Robert Fitzharding to become a house of rest for the abbot and monks of St Augustine's Abbey, which became Bristol Cathedral. As "Abbot's Leigh" it was distinguished from other places named "Leigh". At the dissolution of the monasteries, Paul Bush, the Bishop of Bristol, surrendered it by a deed dated 25 May 1549 to Henry VIII; on 23 September the King granted the reversion of the manor, after the death of the bishop (which took place in 1559), to Sir George Norton (d. 1585).

Miles baronets, of Leigh Court
- Motto: Labora sicut bonus miles
- Arms: Azure a chevron paly of six ermine and or between three lozenges argent each charged with a fleur-de-lis sable, in chief upon an inescutcheon argent a sinister hand appaume coupled at the wrist gules
- Crest: Upon a helm barry affronte with visor open a dexter arm embowed in armour proper garnished or supporting with the hand an anchor also proper

The original Leigh Court was an Elizabethan mansion built by Sir George Norton. His great-great-grandson, also George Norton (born 1622), unknowingly hosted Charles II, who arrived at the house the evening of 12 September 1651, during his escape to France following the Battle of Worcester. The Nortons were friends of the Kings's travelling companion, Jane Lane. The Nortons were unaware of the King's identity during his three-day stay. While staying at Leigh Court and after being recognised by the elderly butler, who had served the King when a young Prince at Richmond, Charles deflected suspicion by asking a trooper, who had been in the King's personal guard, to describe the King's appearance and clothing at the Battle of Worcester. The man looked at Charles and said, "The King was at least three inches taller than you." Richard Ollard describes the house in The Escape of Charles II, After the Battle of Worcester:

"Abbots Leigh was the most magnificent of all the houses in which Charles was sheltered during his escape. A drawing made in 1788, only twenty years before it was pulled down, shows a main front of twelve gables, surmounting three storeys of cowled windows; a comfortable, solid west country Elizabethan house."

=== Original house images ===
1.The Gateway to Abbots' Leigh House, where Charles II took refuge after the Battle of Worcester 2.Side view of Abbots' Leigh House 3.Main façade of Abbots' Leigh House c.1788 A sketch c.1580 of the front elevation of Abbots' Leigh House (note 13 gables?) referred to as the Old Court House

After the Restoration, the King made George Norton a Knight; his widow set up an elaborate monument to him in the church at Abbot's Leigh.

The manor of Abbot's Leigh eventually passed into the hands of the Trenchard family after Sir George Norton's son, also Sir George (1648–1715), and his daughter Grace (1676–1697) both died without issue. William Trenchard of Cutteridge, Wiltshire, had married Ellen Norton, sister and coheir of Sir George. The direct Trenchard line died out on the death of John William Hippisley Trenchard (1740–1801) and the 2,500 acres (10 km^{2}) estate and the old Tudor manor, now in a state of disrepair, was sold in 1811 to Philip John Miles (1773–1845), the mayor and member of parliament for Bristol. Miles also owned properties and extensive estates elsewhere including Kings Weston House (by Sir John Vanbrugh), The Manor House (Old Rectory) at Walton-in-Gordano, Walton Castle, Cardigan Priory and Underdown by Anthony Keck in Ledbury, Herefordshire.

=== Rebuilding ===
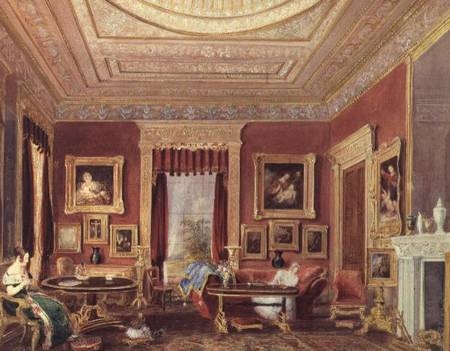
The Drawing Room, Leigh Court, Bristol, c.1840. Oil on canvas by Thomas Leeson Scrase Rowbotham

Miles demolished the original building around 1812 and in 1814 rebuilt the seat a mile further north-east, to designs by Thomas Hopper, that were based on plans which Hopper had previously drawn for Pythouse, Wiltshire. Philip Miles died in 1845, leaving Leigh Court to his eldest son, William Miles, for whom the Miles Baronetcy of Leigh Court, Somerset was created in 1859. In 1884 the second Baronet, Sir Sir Philip Miles, entertained the Prince of Wales, later Edward VII.

Miles purchased the art collection of Richard Hart Davis and others. The mansion eventually housed a collection of over a hundred paintings representing many Old Masters – Domenichino (including the St John the Evangelist sold in 2009 for £9.2 million), Titian, Poussin, Michelangelo, Raphael, Rubens, Claude Lorrain (including the Altieri Claudes) and Van Dyke, as well as numerous family portraits; however, the majority of the more famous paintings were sold between 1884 and 1898. In the middle of the 19th century it was possible to visit the house to view the art collection on Thursday afternoons upon application to the Miles family's business offices at 61 Queen Square, Bristol (formerly the house of Philip John Miles's father, William Miles).

=== Hospital ===
The Miles family continued to occupy the house until 1917 when, in common with many such houses, it had become oversized for modern living; with death duties to pay, it was put up for auction; however, the house and 76 acres (31 ha) were withdrawn from the sale. They were then used by Rev Harold Nelson Burden, during a period of institutional use as a hospital. Burden had been the chaplain at Horfield Prison, and with his wife Katharine had founded the National Institutions for Persons Requiring Care and Control to care for mentally disabled children and adults. In 1908 they rented the Stoke Park estate, opening the Stoke Park Colony in April 1909. The colony was the first institution certified as a home for mentally disabled patients under the Mental Deficiency Act 1913, Burden having been a member of the royal commission for inquiry into care of the feeble-minded that led to the Act. The colony was regarded as a leading institution of its type. Leigh Court continued to operate as part of the Stoke Park Hospital group until taken over by the National Health Service in 1948 but was subsequently restored.

During the 1980s, Leigh Woods (surrounding the house) were used to film the TV series, Robin of Sherwood starring Michael Praed (later Jason Connery).

=== Current use ===
Since 2000, Leigh Court has been restored and many rooms and outbuildings have been converted for use as office accommodation, conference and meeting rooms. It is also approved by North Somerset council as a venue for civil wedding services. Business West (formerly the Bristol Chamber of Commerce and Initiative) also have their head offices at the house.

== Architecture ==
Externally the architectural style of Leigh Court is Palladian. The house, built of Bath stone, has a hipped slate roof with a glazed and coffered area over its Great Hall. The appearance of the south-east and north-west elevations mirror each other. Each has three central bays, These project slightly from the rest of the frontage. The porticoes have of four, unfluted Ionic columns, above which are pediments on the plain entablature. Ionic columns can also be found on the seven bay north-east elevation. There are two-storey service wings attached to the main house.

The interior is decorated in Greek Revival. style. Immediately inside the entrance is a hall laid with a stone and marble patterned floor. The ceiling has a saucer dome supported by eight marble Ionic columns in a circle. In addition it contains decorative anthemion friezes and a stone and marble patterned floor. The morning room in the east corner is in a late 19th century Adam/Wyatt style.

The mansion is entered from the south-east front through an Entrance Hall measuring about 30-foot (9.1 m) square, around which four pairs of massive marble pillars with Ionic capitals giving the impression of a circular room. This leads to the Great hall 50-foot (15 m) by 30-foot (9.1 m) and 50-foot (15 m) high extending to the glazed and coffered roof; the Hall is surrounded by galleries on the first floor which are supported by marble pillars with Ionic capitals. This in turn leads on to the Salon which is the same size as the Entrance Hall. To the right of the Great Hall is the Library which is 55-foot (17 m) by 25-foot (7.6 m) and was fitted with bookcases on three sides to the full height of the room and has two mauve marble fireplaces and deep coved friezes and cornicing. The ceiling, 18-foot (5.5 m) high, is of a bold, coffered geometrical design. The Library leads, to its right, to the Morning Room, about 35-foot (11 m) by 24-foot (7.3 m) and to its left to the Drawing Room of the same size as the Morning Room, decorated with gilt and tapestries and with views extending across the Severn to the Welsh hills. To the left of the Salon is the Dining room, of the same size as the Morning Room. Also to the left of the Great Hall are a Billiard room, Smoking room (now used as a bar when the house hosts receptions), Gun Room and WCs.

The Great Hall which has a double staircase still contains an original pipe organ built by Flight and Robson of London. In addition to being played manually, it could originally be set to play the overture and a duet ("Ah, Perdona") from Mozart's Clemenza di Tito.

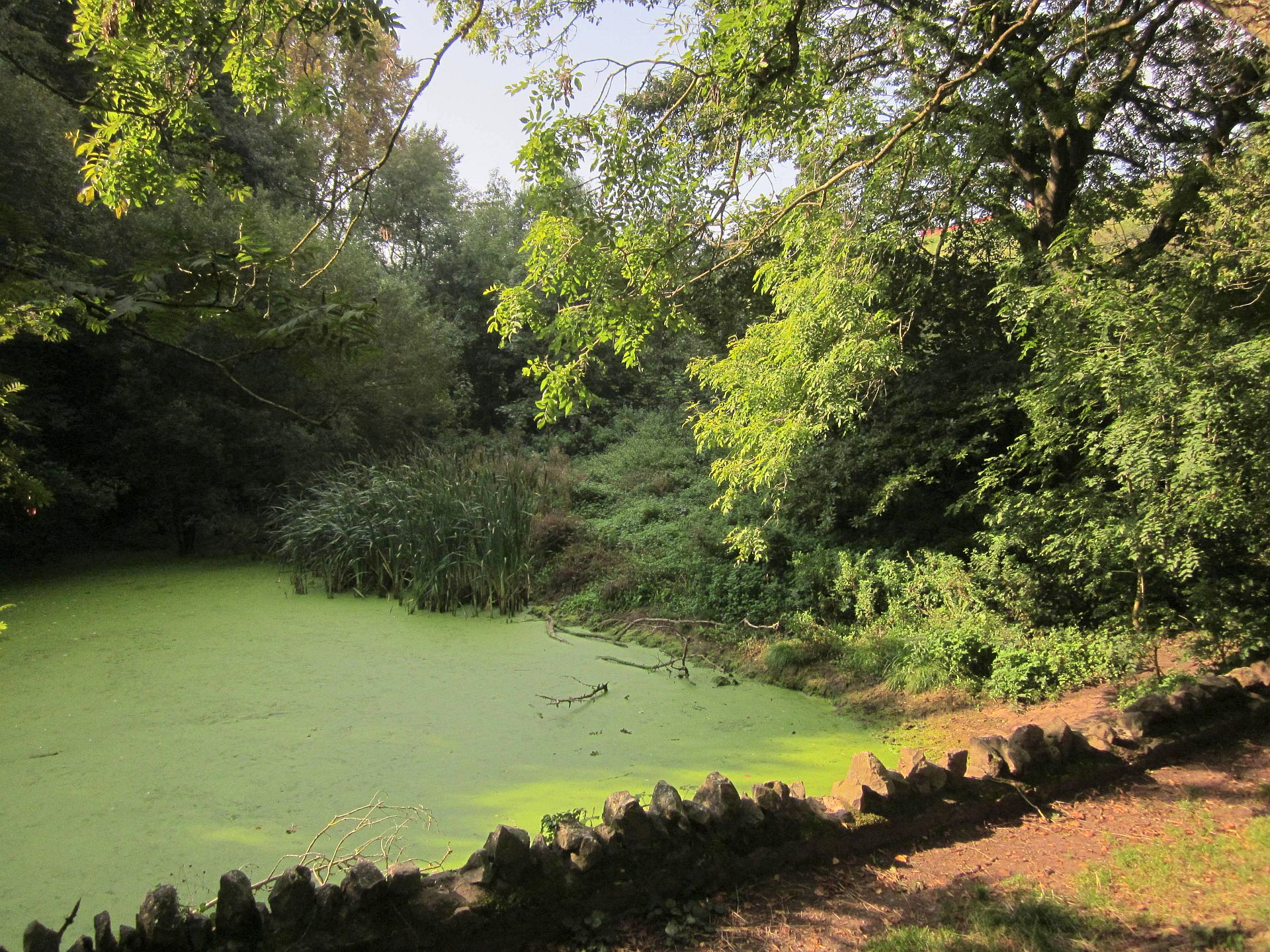
A pond in Leigh Woods attached to the estate

On the first floor is a suite of six "principal" bedrooms of approximately 24-foot (7.3 m) by 19-foot (5.8 m) and two dressing rooms, with a further eight other "best" bedrooms of approximately 20-foot (6.1 m) by 15-foot (4.6 m). There are two secondary bedrooms or "night nurseries" and a "day nursery" or school room as well as bathrooms and WCs. On a mezzanine level are workrooms, store rooms and closets. On the second floor are fourteen "Maidservants' Bedrooms" though most such bedrooms have been converted to office space. In the south-west wing on the first floor level are eight "Menservants' Bedrooms", again converted subsequently to office space and on the ground floor level are the domestic offices which were originally the Butler's Pantry, Butler's Room, Servants' hall, Housekeeper's Room, Kitchen, Still room, Scullery, Dairy, Wash-house etc., though these again have mainly been converted to office space. In the basement there are extensive wine cellars, storage and boiler space.

The former seven-bay stable block, which was built around 1814, has now been converted into workshops and offices.

== Grounds ==
The grounds were originally landscaped by Humphry Repton. At the turn of the 19th century a 2-acre (0.81 ha) walled garden was built to provide food for the estate. Sections of the extensive estate have been sold off since 1952. In 1974 the Ministry of Agriculture, Fisheries and Food bought the woodland associated with the house and this is now Leigh Woods National Nature Reserve and includes the area known as Paradise Bottom. The current estate covers 128 hectares (320 acres) including lawns, woodland, flower gardens and a pond. Some of the trees on the site were lost during the Great storm of 1987.

A not-for-profit organic farm has been established based on the walled garden, and buildings within the old estate are used by a charity providing mental health services and by the Macmillan Lymphedema Service.
