= The Dower House, Stoke Park =

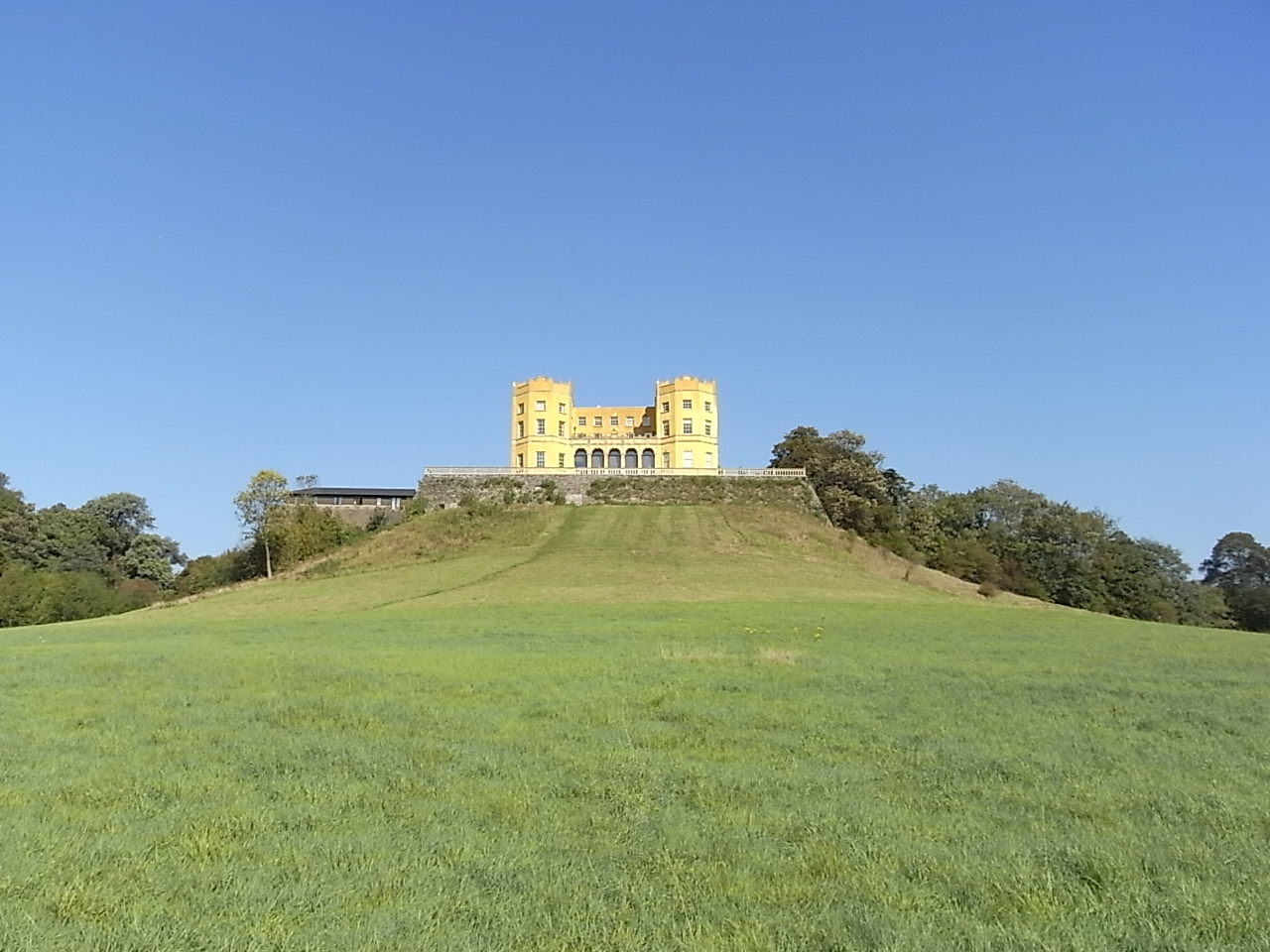
- The Dower House, Stoke Park, Bristol after restoration

- Location in Bristol

General information
- Location: England, Bristol
- Coordinates: 51.492896°N 2.545427°W
- OS grid: ST62230 77247

The Dower House, Stoke Park is a dower house in Bristol, England. It is one of Bristol's more prominent landmarks, set on Purdown, a hill above the M32 motorway on the main approach into the city, and painted yellow.

The house was built in 1553 by Sir Richard Berkeley. Rebuilt by Norborne Berkeley, 4th Baron Botetourt circa 1760, it eventually became used as a dower house by the dukes of Beaufort at nearby Badminton House. This included Charles Somerset, 4th Duke of Beaufort (the son of Henry Somerset, 2nd Duke of Beaufort) and wife Elizabeth Somerset, Duchess of Beaufort whose daughter's obelisk can be found to this date on the hill she died on from falling off a horse.

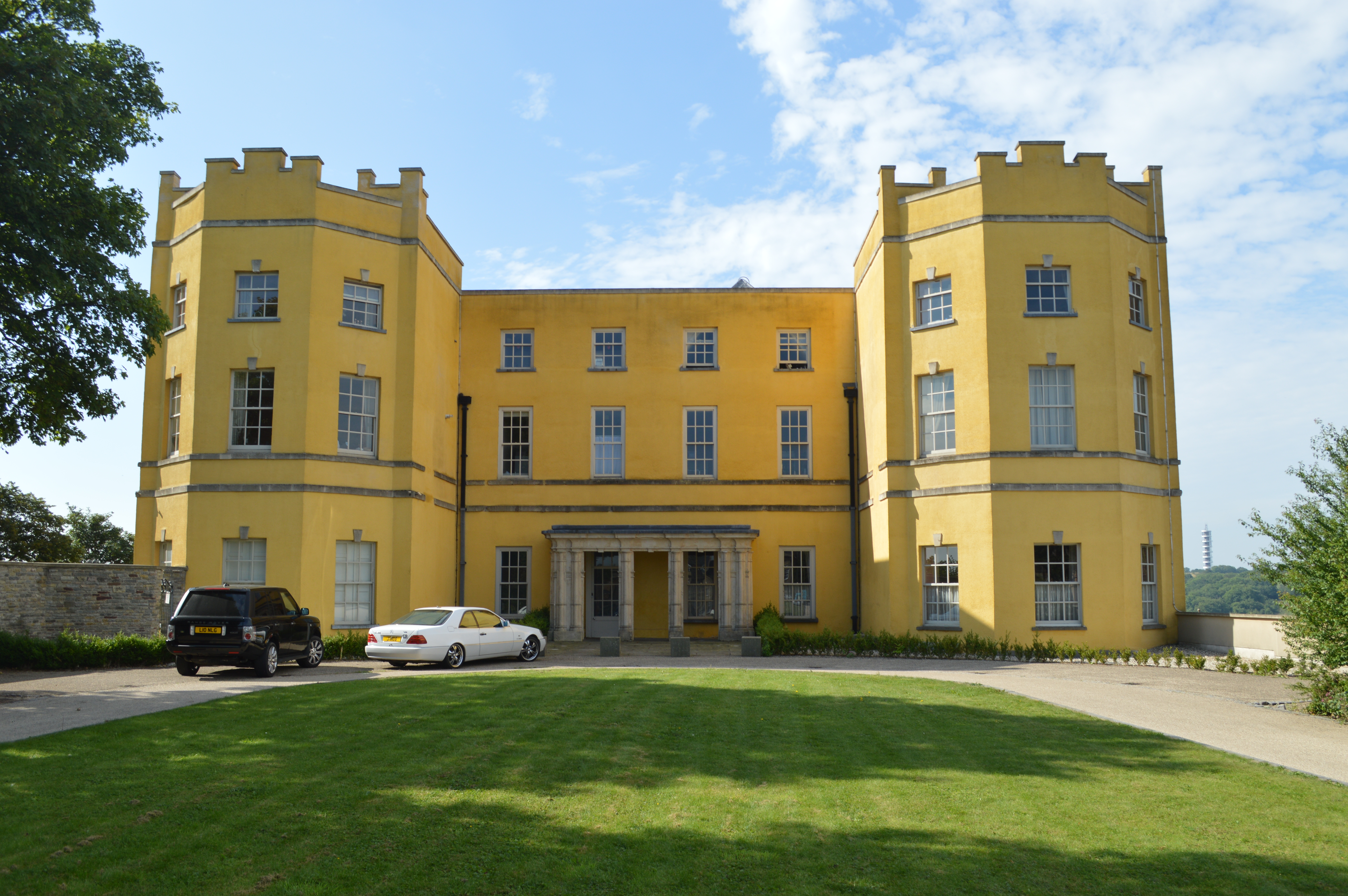
The Dower House from the north-east

It was used as part of Stoke Park Hospital, previously Stoke Park Colony, from 1909. The house closed as hospital wards in November 1986 when the final remaining patients were moved to other wards, though the laundry remained for a period. The building was sold in 1991 to the Sennitt and Neate families who planned to redevelop the house into a nursing home, and it was rented to the nearby University of the West of England (UWE) for lectures and seminars in the interim, while the facilities at the Frenchay campus were redeveloped. The last UWE lecture was in spring 2003.

Residential planning permission was sought, but before any planning permission was acquired, in 1998 the house was sold on to a consortium of housing developers.

The main house was converted into 13 apartments in 2004.

The estate is now maintained as an open space by Bristol City Council, known as Stoke Park Estate.

Several aspects of the house and estate are listed. The house is Grade II* listed. The balustraded terrace, the Orangery, the remains of the Obelisk, and the Broomhill Gate are all Grade II listed. The woods contain the Beaufort Memorial, the cold bath and a partially derelict stone tunnel with rusticated entrance arches, all also Grade II listed.

It is known locally as "The Yellow Castle" or "Custard Castle".

== Haunted history ==
Dower House is rumoured to be haunted by the ghost of Elizabeth Somerset, daughter of Charles Noel Somerset, 4th Duke of Beaufort, who died in 1760 from injuries sustained after falling from her horse.

Many visitors have claimed that they have heard galloping hooves as they travel through - although horses haven't been on the grounds for years.

Steve England, a conservation educator and RHS horticulturist, states that “I’ve heard the sound of thumping hooves behind me on numerous occasions, once so vividly I jumped out of the way, but there was nothing there."
