= Andy Hayman =

British police officer and author

Andy Hayman CBE QPM

Assistant Commissioner for Specialist Operations, Metropolitan police
- In office 2005–2007

Chief Constable of Norfolk Constabulary
- In office 2002–2005

Personal details
- Born: Andrew Christopher Hayman; 1959 (age 66–67) Essex, England
- Profession: Police officer

Andrew Christopher Hayman CBE QPM (born 1959) is a retired British police officer and author of The Terrorist Hunters. Hayman held the rank of Chief Constable of Norfolk Constabulary and Assistant Commissioner for Specialist Operations at London's Metropolitan Police, the highest-ranking officer responsible for counter-terrorism in the United Kingdom. Hayman was directly responsible for the investigation into the 7 July 2005 London bombings. He has also spoken for the Association of Chief Police Officers, first on drugs policy, and later on counter-terrorism.

== Early career and personal life ==
Born in Essex in 1959, Hayman is married and has two children. He joined Essex Police from school in 1978, rising to the rank of superintendent in 1995 and subsequently to chief superintendent in 1997. In 1998, Hayman transferred to the Metropolitan Police and gained the rank of commander, taking charge of the force's drugs unit, before moving on to head the Directorate of Professional Standards and to serve as an aide to the deputy commissioner. From 1998 to 2005, Hayman was also the spokesman on drugs for the Association of Chief Police Officers (ACPO).

In 2002, Hayman was appointed Chief Constable of Norfolk Constabulary, a role in which he established the county's Major Investigation Unit, responsible for providing a quick response to serious crime in Norfolk. While chief constable, Hayman was awarded the Queen's Police Medal in the 2004 Queen's Birthday Honours.

== Specialist Operations ==
Rejoining the Met in February 2005, Hayman left Norfolk to become the Metropolitan Police Service's Assistant Commissioner for Specialist Operations, a role which placed him in overall charge of counter-terrorism operations conducted by the now defunct Special Branch and the Anti-Terrorist Branch.

Six months after taking up the post as head of Specialist Operations, Hayman was the overall head of the investigation into the 7 July 2005 London bombings, the largest criminal investigation in British history. In the 2006 Queen's Birthday Honours he was appointed Commander of the Order of the British Empire for his handling of the investigation.

Hayman resigned from the Service on 4 December 2007, following allegations about expense claims and alleged improper conduct with a female member of the Independent Police Complaints Commission (IPCC) and a female sergeant.

Hayman, along with Commissioner Sir Ian Blair, was criticised by the press and the Independent Police Complaints Commission over the mistaken shooting dead of Jean Charles de Menezes at Stockwell Underground station on 22 July 2005.

== News of the World phone hacking affair ==
Hayman was in charge of the initial inquiry into phone hacking by the News of the World. In April 2010 The Guardian reported that he "subsequently left the police to work for News International as a columnist". He has contributed to The Times, owned by NI, and there has "written in defence of the police investigation and maintained there were 'perhaps a handful' of hacking victims."

Hayman appeared before the Home Affairs Select Committee on 12 July 2011 when he confirmed that he had received hospitality from people he was investigating in relation to a criminal offence, although he regarded this as normal and operational matters were not discussed. During this hearing, Select Committee member Lorraine Fullbrook said that the public saw him as a "dodgy geezer" for the financial and sexual allegations surrounding his resignation from the police, for his "cosying up to the executives of News International" and for "the disaster" of his enquiry into the phone hacking scandal.

== See also ==
- News International phone hacking scandal
- Phone hacking scandal reference lists
- Metropolitan police role in phone hacking scandal
