= Harold Nelson Burden =

Anglican minister and missionary

Reverend Harold Nelson Burden (20 March 1860 – 15 May 1930) was an Anglican minister, missionary and, with his wife, founder of institutions for the care of inebriates and people with mental disabilities.

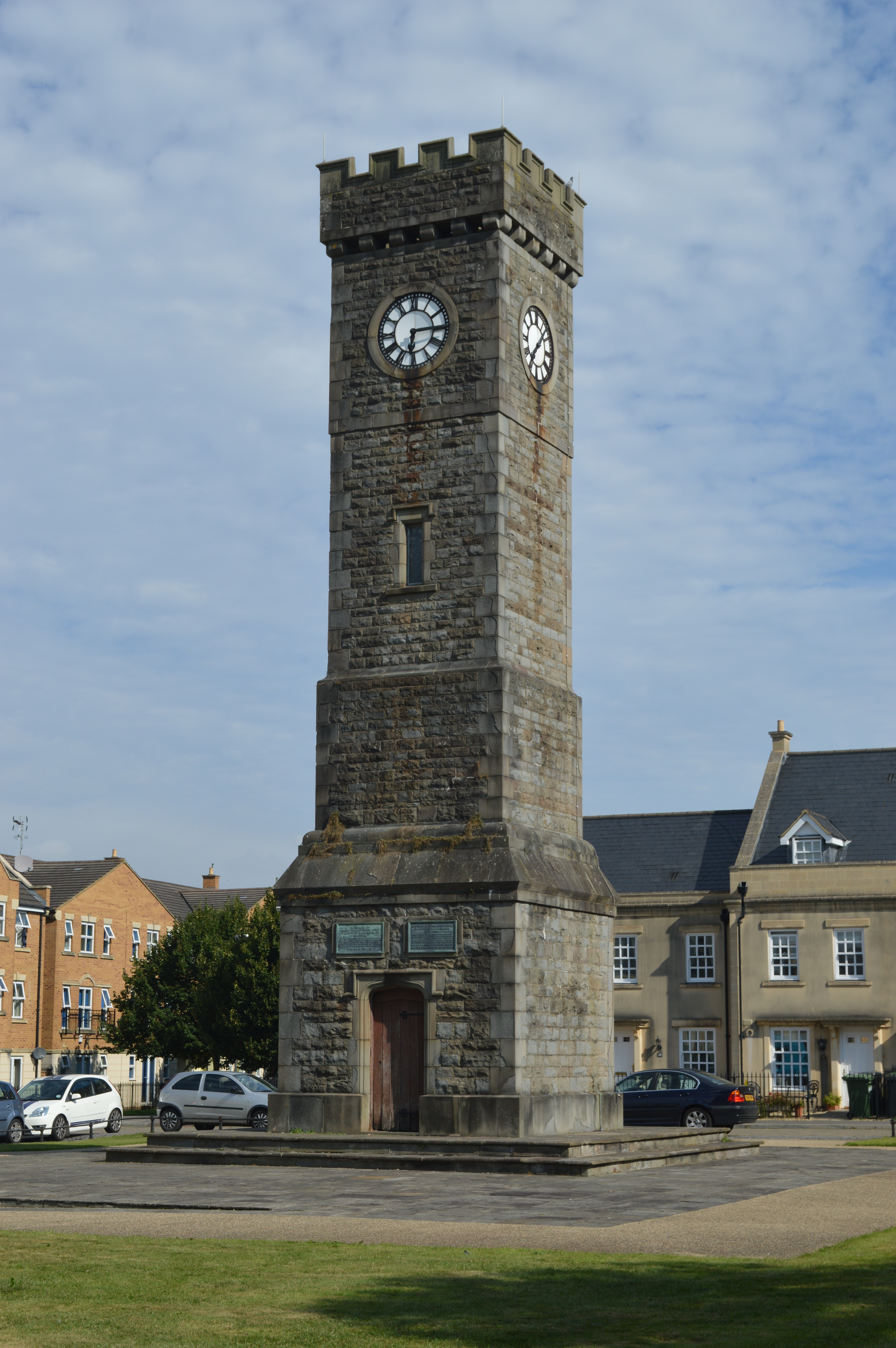
The clock tower at Stoke Park Hospital (formerly Stoke Park Colony), erected to the memory of the Rev Harold Nelson Burden

== Early life and career ==
Burden was born in Hythe, Kent, the eldest of three children of Thomas Burden, a grocer, and his wife Sarah née Munk. His father died when he was 12. His first career was as a grazier but he went bankrupt in 1886.

He may then have worked in agriculture in Mariansleigh, Devon where his probable ex-schoolmaster was Rector - this is the address he uses when he marries. He also later claimed he worked in the slums of London where he met his future wife Catherine Mary Garton (16 July 1846 - 25 November 1919). She came from a Hull family of snuff manufacturers who became impoverished after they moved to London. She is said to have been a worker for Octavia Hill from 1870. A letter of Octavia's extolling 'Miss G." is published. There is good evidence she stayed at Octavia's sister's country house in 1881.

Harold and Kate heard the Bishop of Algoma preach at St Martin's-in-the-Fields on the 8 July 1888 and decided to become missionaries in Algoma. To this end he was ordained Deacon by the Bishop of Carlisle, and Harold and Kate married on 26 September 1888 and sailed from Liverpool the next day. His bankruptcy was discharged whilst he was out of the country.

They took over the anglican mission at Uffington, Ontario, an area being logged and developing as an agricultural area. There they had two children who died as infants and Harold was ordained priest. Harold became ill and they were forced to return to England, after having built or improved 4 churches and a new parsonage in his circuit. He later published an autobiographical account of his time.

They returned to England in 1891, and as Harold's licence as a priest did not apply in England, became a curate in Holy Trinity, Shoreditch under the charismatic Revd Arthur Osborne Montgomery Jay working in the most infamous slums of London. When here he bought membership of the Worshipful Company of Barbers and so became a freeman of the City of London. He moved on to study in Cambridge in 1893, where he was chaplain of St Catharine's College, Cambridge, and curate for Milton, and became a licensed preacher in England in 1895 and took up work in Bristol.

== Bristol and work with "Inebriates" ==
In 1895 Harold and his wife moved to Bristol to take up the post of clerical secretary of the Church of England Temperance Society, Police Court and Prison Gate Mission. Here he immediately put energy into the re-establishment of their Women's Shelter, which had recently closed for lack of funds. This opened in 1897 in front of Horfield Prison as the Royal Victoria Home, for Inebriate Women, licensed as a (Voluntary) Retreat under the 1879 Habitual Drunkards Act. Catherine was the Hon. Lady Superintendent and Harold the resident chaplain. The house was a success and expanded to take criminal women.

A new Inebriates Act was working through parliament to allow magistrates to compulsorily admit habitual drunkards into Inebriate Reformatories for treatment for 3 years. Harold set up the first Licensed Reformatory at Brentry House funded by the Royal Victoria Home Charity and a consortium of Councils who purchased beds. it opened as the Royal Victoria Homes, Brentry. This took both men and women and was the only male reformatory in the country. Harold fell out with the committee, when the councils had to financially bail out the Homes in 1902. He and Catherine bought the original Royal Victoria Home and then rented a series of buildings around the country to create the National Institutions for Inebriates. They rented Whittington Hall, Chesterfield in 1902; Lewes Workhouse later the same year and then resigned from Brentry and operated the three institutions as a single system with admissions to Lewes, treatment in Chesterfield, and final rehabilitation at the Royal Victoria Home, Horfield. They then added a building at Ackworth and in 1904 added the old Kenninghall workhouse at East Harling. By the end of 1904 they operated over 600 beds from offices in London, including controlling admissions to Brentry. As such they had created and controlled the majority of inebriate reformatory beds in England.

However by 1906 the magistrates had started to become disillusioned with the efficacy of the inebriate reformatories. Most inmates returned to drink on discharge and the institutions started to be seen as expensive prisons. In 1907 the London Council, as the largest user of Reformatories, resolved to end its contract with the National Institutions.

== The Move into "Mental Deficiciency" ==
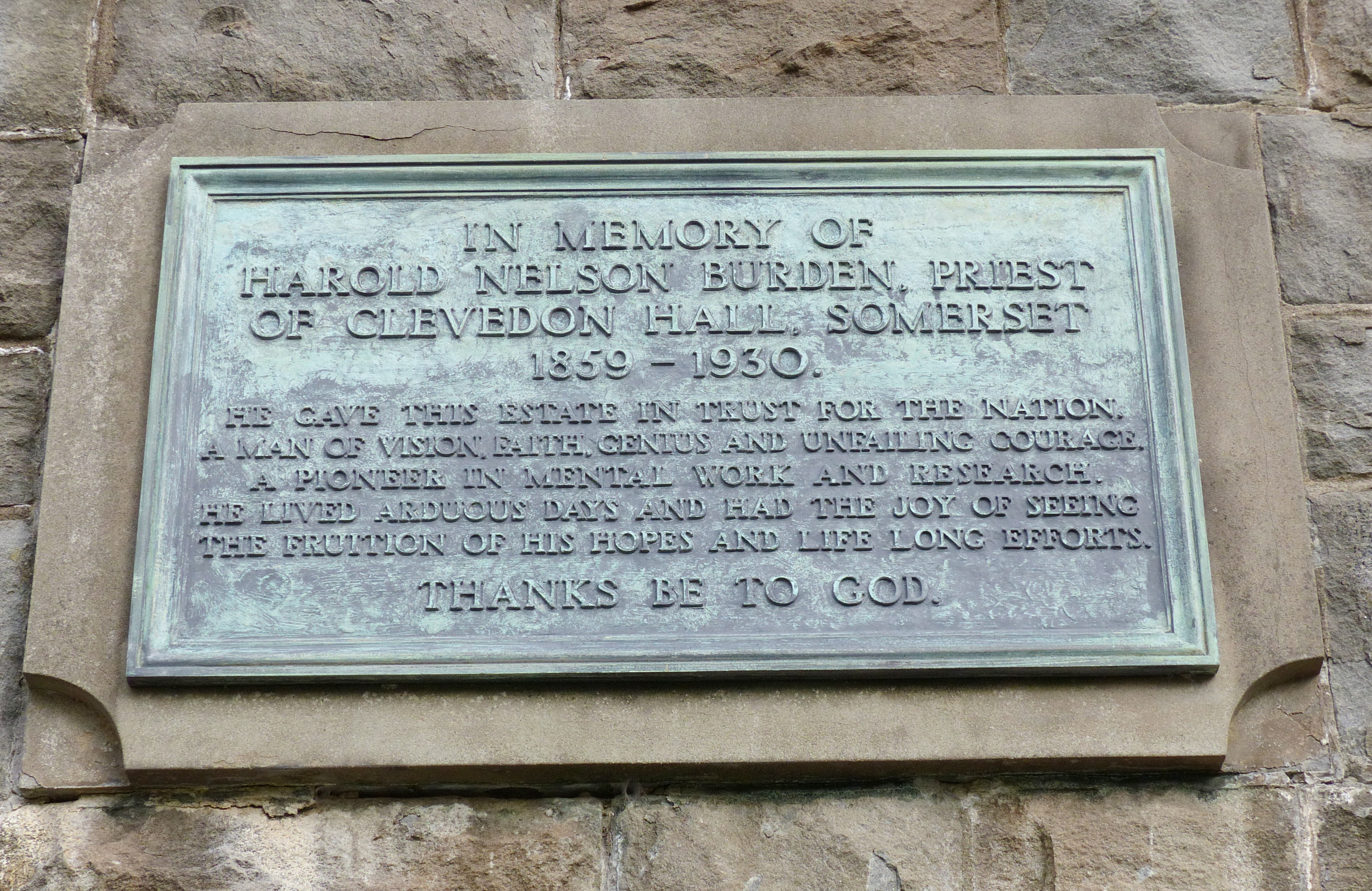
Plaque commemorating the life of Harold Burden, mounted on the former Stoke Park hospital clock tower

Burden had good relations with the Home Office as he had created most of the accommodation needed for the Inebriates Act. In 1904 he was appointed to the Royal Commission on the Care and Control of the Feeble-Minded, in which he was an active member. The Commission led to the Mental Deficiency Act 1913; setting up "colonies" for 'mental defectives' to protect the public and protect them from the public.

When on the commission Harold learnt of the need for accommodation for Birmingham children once they left special schools. In 1906 he offered to open a boarding school for mental defective children. Sandwell Hall, near West Bromwich, opened in 1907 as an Industrial School for Mentally Defective Children, and quickly reached full capacity at 200 boys. It was the first such school. In 1909 they expanded by leasing the Dower House in Bristol to create the core of the Stoke Park Colony.

With the passing of the Mental Deficiency Act, the Burdens put all their property in a trust - the National Institutions for Persons Requiring Care and Control, with the institutions operated by an incorporated company. The Burdens tried to convert all their reformatories into Mental Deficiency Colonies. Few lasted and Lewes, Ackworth and East Harling closed. The Burdens took on property around Bristol, opening a series of houses in Stapleton, which later became West Side (for men), Hanham Hall, and Leigh Court (for women) as well as his own hall at Clevedon Hall. Stoke Park was reserved for children and women. By 1917 the Stoke Park cluster housed 1528 people, making it largest licensed institution in the country. With Whittington Hall and his continued control of the admissions to Brentry the Burdens had created and controlled over a quarter of the beds in England.

The referrals of Inebriates collapsed and in 1922 the last inebriate sentenced under the inebriates act was discharged from Brentry and it became wholly a mental Deficiency colony for men.

== Later years ==
Katherine Burden died in 1919; Harold Burden married in 1920 Rosa Gladys Williams (12 May 1863 - 17 September 1939), the superintendent of the Stoke Park Colony, with whom he continued philanthropic work.

Harold Burden was master of the Worshipful Company of Barbers in 1923. He died on 15 May 1930 at his home at Clevedon Hall, and was buried at Clevedon parish church.

Stoke Park Colony had become important for neurological and psychiatric research; in 1933, Rosa Burden founded the Burden Mental Research Trust, an expansion of earlier research. The Burden Neurological Institute was built in the grounds of Stoke Park in 1939.

After Rosa Burden's death the NIPRCC continued running the colonies and also provided accommodation for St Christopher School, founded by a Stoke Park secretary.

The NHS Act took over all prior hospitals. Uniquely, it was argued that the Act only nationalised the company that operated the institutions and the Minister of State was forced to purchase the properties off the Trustees. The NIPRCC became the Burden Trust in 1956.

At his death, Harold Burden or his trusts owned over three square miles around Bristol. The University of the West of England and the suburb of Lockleaze are built on land previously owned by him.
