= Alexis Delahante =

French painter and antique/art dealer

Alexis Delahante (c. 1767–1837) was a French painter and antiques and art dealer, most notable for his advice to European aristocrats in London and elsewhere before and after the French Revolution.

Delahante was trading in Paris prior to the French Revolution, but left at the time of the Revolution and settled in London, where he traded from Great Marlborough Street. He returned to Paris in 1815 and continued to trade from there.

Delahante supplied carved wooden panels for Windsor Castle in 1826. He also sold several items of furniture to King George IV.

== Sources ==
- Sylvain Cordier, 'Inventing and selling historical furniture: The taste and the career of Alexis Delahante, painter, expert and curio dealer', Revue de l'Art 184(2):63-74 - June 2014
