= Putin's Kleptocracy =

Book by Karen Dawisha

- Author: Karen Dawisha
- Language: English
- Subject: Vladimir Putin, corruption in Russia
- Publisher: Simon & Schuster
- Publication date: 2014
- Pages: 445 pp.
- ISBN: 978-1-4767-9519-5
- OCLC: 896792256

Putin's Kleptocracy: Who Owns Russia? is a 2014 book by Karen Dawisha. Published by Simon & Schuster, it chronicles the rise of Vladimir Putin during his time in Saint Petersburg in the 1990s. In the book, Dawisha exposes how Putin's friends and coworkers from his formative years have accumulated mass amounts of wealth and power. Although Putin was elected with promises to rein in the oligarchs who had emerged in the 1990s, Dawisha writes that Putin transformed "an oligarchy independent of, and more powerful than, the state into a corporatist structure in which oligarchs served at the pleasure of state officials, who themselves gained and exercised economic control... both for the state and for themselves." As a result, 110 individuals control 35% of Russia's wealth, according to Dawisha. Whereas scholars have traditionally viewed Putin's Russia as a democracy in the process of failing, Dawisha argues that "from the beginning Putin and his circle sought to create an authoritarian regime ruled by a close-knit cabal... who used democracy for decoration rather than direction."

== Publication controversy ==
Dawisha sought to publish Putin's Kleptocracy with Cambridge University Press (CUP), with which she had previously published five books and which had initially accepted the book for publication. However, her 500-page manuscript, a quarter of which was evidentiary footnotes, was rejected by CUP. Editor John Haslam cited the legal risk of publishing the manuscript in an email of March 20, later published by Edward Lucas in The Economist. Haslam wrote that "Given the controversial subject matter of the book, and its basic premise that Putin's power is founded on his links to organised crime, we are not convinced that there is a way to rewrite the book that would give us the necessary comfort." Dawisha responded that "one of the world's most important and reputable publishers declines to proceed with a book not because of its scholarly quality... but because the subject matter itself is too hot to handle." Dawisha clarified that her indignation was not directed at CUP, but at the climate in Britain that allows "pre-emptive bookburning". Similarly, the Financial Times pointed to "fear of the UK's claimant-friendly libel laws". Dawisha later found a publisher in the US, where the libel laws are less restrictive.

== Critical reception ==
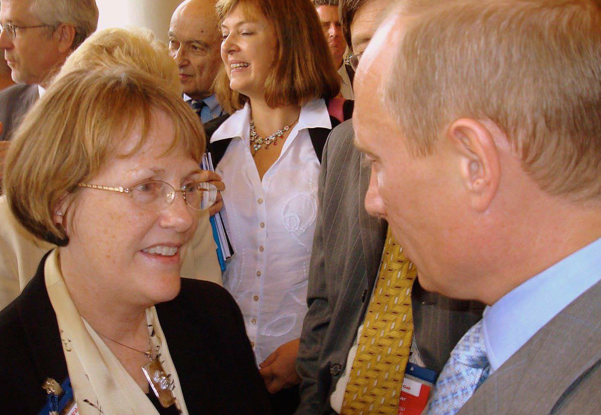
Dawisha in conversation with Putin

Putin's Kleptocracy has been called an "unblinking scholarly exposé" animated by "admirable relentlessness", in which "the power of her argument is amplified by the coolness of her prose". Although some have argued that Dawisha's book unleashes a "torrent of detail" which might "drown readers who are untutored in Soviet and Russian politics", it is nonetheless regarded as "the most persuasive account we have of corruption in contemporary Russia", and the copious detail is celebrated as a strength by others.

Anne Applebaum commended the book's intense "focus on the financial story of Putin's rise to power: page after page contains the gritty details of criminal operation after criminal operation, including names, dates, and figures," and lauded its courage: "Many of these details had never been put together before — and for good reason."

In an article for The Times Literary Supplement by Richard Sakwa commented that the book is "an extraordinary dossier of malfeasance and political corruption on an epic scale" in which the accusation that "Putin and his close colleagues have enriched themselves is now effectively proven" and "a courageous and scrupulously judicious investigation into the sinews of wealth and power in Vladimir Putin's Russia". Sakwa, however, took issue with the term "kleptocracy" as "the evidence is often circumstantial, conjectural and partial. It would not stand questioning in court", while the connection with alleged kleptocracy in the "formulation of policy is far from clear. The much-vaunted stability of the Putin regime has, after all, delivered significant public goods." Dawisha responded to Sakwa's position in a number of public forums. At a London event in 2015, Dawisha fielded a question referencing Sakwa's review, responding:

"When a president talks about his business elite as chickens sitting on eggs... what is the nature of the understanding that they have? … Where is the rule of law in Russia? … the rule of law for Russia is in London. Why is it that $150 billion left the country last year? Because they believe that their wealth can only be secured in the long term outside their own country. So if you don't have the ability to secure your rights, then I don't think there's any political theory that would say that you have a social contract; not even Russian political theory."

== See also ==
- Bibliography of Vladimir Putin
- Bibliography of Russian history (1991–present)
- Censorship in the United Kingdom
- Moneyland (2018) – referenced the publishing controversy as an example of Moneyland's power
- Kleptopia (2020)
- Putin's People (2020)
