= Carter-Ruck =

UK law firm

- Headquarters: The Bureau, 90 Fetter Lane; London, EC4A; United Kingdom
- Major practice areas: Libel, privacy, international law and commercial disputes
- Key people: Nigel Tait (Managing Partner); Cameron Doley (Senior Partner)
- Date founded: 1982
- Founder: Peter Carter-Ruck
- Website: www.carter-ruck.com

Carter-Ruck is a British law firm founded by Peter Carter-Ruck. The firm specialises in libel, privacy, international law and commercial disputes. The leading legal directories (Legal 500 and Chambers and Partners) rank Carter-Ruck in the top tier of media, defamation and privacy lawyers in the UK.

Carter-Ruck has been criticised for using intimidating and threatening tactics against journalists, government officials, and citizens to support the interests of their clients. In 2022, a U.S. Congressman from Tennessee recommended that six Carter-Ruck lawyers be banned from entering the United States because of their ongoing work on behalf of Russian oligarchs.

== Background ==
The firm was founded by Peter Carter-Ruck in 1982 after his former partners in Oswald Hickson told him to retire.

== Notable clients and cases ==
Recent or current clients include the State of Qatar, Cubby Broccoli, Tesco, Rached Ghannouchi, Sir Elton John, Simon Cowell, Yusuf Islam (formerly Cat Stevens), Liam Gallagher, Jude Law, Prince Radu of Romania, Frank Bruno and Chelsea Football Club. The firm represents numerous MPs (including government ministers), MEPs and other political figures including a number of national governments and heads of state.

=== Russian oligarchs ===
Carter-Ruck acted for the Russian businessman Boris Berezovsky in a number of libel and other actions, including in the House of Lords against Forbes magazine, The Guardian and Russian broadcaster VGTRK.

Carter-Ruck was involved in legal action against Financial Times journalist Catherine Belton and her publisher HarperCollins over her book Putin's People.

After Russia invaded Ukraine in 2022, Carter-Ruck said it condemned the invasion and that the firm would not represent individuals associated with the Vladimir Putin regime.

=== Madeleine McCann ===
The firm has been involved in several libel cases related to the missing child Madeleine McCann. Complaints were brought on behalf of the child's parents, Kate and Gerry McCann, against the Daily Express, the Daily Star and their sister Sunday newspapers over stories that suggested that the parents might have been involved in Madeleine's disappearance. The complaints led to the publication of unprecedented front-page apologies to Kate and Gerry McCann, in addition to a payment of £550,000 in damages, which was donated to the fund to find Madeleine.

Carter-Ruck also advised the so-called 'Tapas Seven', the friends who were dining with the child's parents when she went missing. The complaints again led to the publication of an apology and a payment of £375,000 in damages, donated to the fundraising group Madeleine's Fund.

=== Church of Scientology ===
In late 2008, John Duignan, a former Scientologist, published The Complex: An Insider Exposes the Covert World of the Church of Scientology, a book critical of Scientology. Carter-Ruck, citing defamation laws, stopped Amazon from publishing the book in Britain.

In 2010, Carter-Ruck represented the Church of Scientology regarding 28 September 2010 broadcast on "Secrets of Scientology" aired by BBC's Panorama, claiming the journalist involved was biased.

In 2016, Carter-Ruck were again found to be representing Scientology in the UK when they sent several letters to Louis Theroux and his producers during the making of My Scientology Movie threatening, amongst other things, legal action and an injunction against its release. The film was released in 2015.

=== Trafigura ===
Carter-Ruck was instructed by commodities trader Trafigura over press coverage relating to the discharge of oil 'slops' from a Trafigura-chartered tanker in Ivory Coast in 2006. Libel proceedings were brought against the BBC in 2009 after a broadcast of the current affairs programme Newsnight suggested that Trafigura's actions had caused a number of deaths, miscarriages and serious injuries. The BBC went on to broadcast an apology as the opening item on Newsnight. The BBC also apologised in a Statement in Open Court.

Corrections concerning Trafigura were also published by The Times, The Independent, and The Guardian.

In September 2009, The Guardian reported that Carter-Ruck demanded it delete published articles relating to the Trafigura toxic oil disaster, saying it was "gravely defamatory" and "untrue" to say that Trafigura's waste had been dumped cheaply and could have caused deaths and serious injuries. The Guardian later reported that Trafigura agreed to pay compensation to 31,000 West African victims. The Guardian also alleged that other media outlets in the Netherlands and Norway were also threatened with gagging orders. These turned out to be NRK in Norway, and De Volkskrant and Greenpeace in the Netherlands.

In October 2009, The Guardian published an article stating that it had been prevented from reporting on a parliamentary matter, being "forbidden from telling its readers why the paper is prevented – for the first time in memory – from reporting parliament. Legal obstacles, which cannot be identified, involve proceedings, which cannot be mentioned, on behalf of a client who must remain secret. The only fact The Guardian can report is that the case involves the London solicitors Carter-Ruck." The paper further claimed that this case appears "to call into question privileges guaranteeing free speech established under the 1688 Bill of Rights".

The question subject to the gagging order was from Paul Farrelly, MP for Newcastle-under-Lyme:

To ask the Secretary of State for Justice, what assessment he has made of the effectiveness of legislation to protect (a) whistleblowers and (b) press freedom following the injunctions obtained in the High Court by (i) Barclays and Freshfields solicitors on 19 March 2009 on the publication of internal Barclays reports documenting alleged tax avoidance schemes and (ii) Trafigura and Carter-Ruck solicitors on 11 September 2009 on the publication of the Minton report on the alleged dumping of toxic waste in the Ivory Coast, commissioned by Trafigura.

The following day the firm agreed to discharge the order preventing the reporting of the events, which concerned Trafigura and a draft chemistry report into the oil slops incident in Ivory Coast. Trafigura maintained that the report was a superseded draft report which was legally privileged and confidential, and that it had been obtained illegally and passed to The Guardian.

According to a press release on Carter-Ruck's website, the reason that The Guardian could not report the question asked by Paul Farrelly was because a gagging order had been in place since 11 September 2009, before the MP asked the question. They also stated that it had never been their intention to prevent the press reporting on parliament and that they had since agreed on changes with The Guardian to the gagging order so that they could report on the issue. The firm also pointed out that The Guardian had in fact consented to the order preventing the newspaper from publishing any article about the chemistry report.

Subsequently, lawyers advising the Speaker of the House of Commons are reported to have agreed with Carter-Ruck's interpretation that the injunction as initially granted did prevent the press from reporting the Parliamentary question.

The Conservative MP Peter Bottomley reported the firm to the Law Society due to their actions which prevented The Guardian covering parliamentary proceedings, but the Law Society did not uphold any complaint.

=== Craig Ames and Robert McGee ===
In 2014, Carter-Ruck unsuccessfully sued cyber security company Spamhaus on behalf of California-based entrepreneurs Craig Ames and Rob McGee, who were involved with a bulk email marketing services business, initially through a US corporation called Blackstar Media LLC, and latterly as employees of Blackstar Marketing, a subsidiary of the English company Adconion Media Group Limited, which bought Blackstar Media in April 2011. Although an initial motion by Spamhaus to strike out the claims failed, they ultimately prevailed when the claimants dropped their case and paid Spamhaus' legal costs.

=== OneCoin ===
In September 2016 Carter-Ruck threatened legal action against Andrew Penman's exposé of the purported cryptocurrency OneCoin. In May 2017, police and financial actions in several countries revealed that Carter-Ruck's client did indeed appear to be operating a Ponzi scheme. Carter-Ruck also sought to gag the media from mentioning OneCoin and one of its fugitive co-founders, Ruja Ignatova, in reporting. The Bureau of Investigative Journalism, Tax Policy Associates, the Foreign Policy Centre, the Free Speech Union and Spotlight on Corruption filed an application in the Solicitors Disciplinary Tribunal where they accused Carter-Ruck of helping OneCoin further a fraud.

=== Labour Party ===
In July 2019, it was revealed that Carter-Ruck had written to Sam Matthews, the Labour Party's former head of disputes, warning he could face legal action for breaking his non-disclosure agreement for blowing the whistle on the party's handling of antisemitism allegations.

=== Jason Arday ===
In September 2025, the Times Higher Education reporter Jack Grove investigated alleged plagiarism by Professor Jason Arday, assembled a 63-page report and contacted Arday for a response. Arday responded with a legal letter from Carter-Ruck, after which the Times Higher Education chose not to publish the story so as to avoid expensive litigation.

== Criticism ==
Sir Christopher Meyer, former chairman of the Press Complaints Commission (PCC) said that the PCC was the firm's "sworn enemy" and accused the firm of using a Commons select committee hearing to attack the PCC. He suggested that Carter-Ruck and other media law firms probably saw the PCC as their enemy because "we can do the job for free and can provide a degree of discretion". Cameron Doley, then managing partner with Carter-Ruck, denied the accusations made against them.

The firm is frequently referred to as 'Carter-Fuck' by the satirical magazine Private Eye. Despite their antagonistic relationship, Carter-Ruck publicly sided with Private Eye when the magazine lost a £600,000 libel case in 1989 against Sonia Sutcliffe, the wife of the Yorkshire Ripper. Founder Peter Carter-Ruck was subsequently invited to attend a Private Eye lunch, and soon afterwards he asked whether the magazine could stop misprinting the first letter of 'Ruck' as an 'F'. Private Eye's response was to print the first letter of 'Carter' as an 'F' as well.

=== The Libel Reform Campaign ===
The Libel Reform Campaign cite many instances where the application of the libel laws by law firms like Carter-Ruck is effectively gagging the freedom of expression and free speech in England and Wales, leaving only the wealthy anywhere in the world able to seek justice in the UK where it would be denied in their own country (see Libel tourism). However, these criticisms have been challenged by leading media law academics Alastair Mullis and Andrew Scott.

An example of Carter-Ruck acting on behalf of a client to stifle criticism was reported in The Guardian newspaper on 19 January 2011. Carter-Ruck on behalf of Midland Pig Producers (MPP) issued a warning letter to the Soil Association (SA) threatening libel proceedings after the SA objected to a MPP planning application. Threatening such proceedings, which are rarely followed through, is a typical modus operandi of Carter-Ruck (and other law firms) to minimise scrutiny of, and adverse publicity toward, their clients – a practice known as a strategic lawsuit against public participation, abbreviated SLAPP.

== Competitors ==
Other firms involved in the same field as Carter-Ruck include Olswang and Reynolds Porter Chamberlain.
