= Catherine Belton =

Journalist and writer

Catherine Belton MBE
- Born: 1973 (age 52–53)
- Occupation: Writer
- Language: English
- Genre: Politics
- Notable works: Putin's People: How the KGB Took Back Russia and Then Took On the West

Catherine Elizabeth Belton MBE (born 1973) is a British journalist and writer. From 2007 to 2013, she was the Moscow correspondent for the Financial Times. In Putin's People: How the KGB Took Back Russia and Then Took On the West, published in 2020, Belton explored the rise of Russian president Vladimir Putin. It was named book of the year by The Economist, the Financial Times, the New Statesman and The Telegraph. It is also the subject of five separate lawsuits brought by Russian billionaires and Rosneft.

Belton lives in London and reports on Russia for The Washington Post.

== Early life ==
Belton graduated from Durham University (Van Mildert College) in 1996 with a degree in Modern Languages.

== Career ==
From 2007 to 2013, Belton worked at the Financial Times as the newspaper's Moscow correspondent, having previously written about Russian current affairs for both The Moscow Times and Business Week. She was also in 2016 the legal correspondent. In 2009, the British Press Awards shortlisted Belton for the Business journalist of the year award.

Belton was appointed Member of the Order of the British Empire (MBE) in the 2023 New Year Honours for services to journalism.

=== Putin's People ===
Published in April 2020 by William Collins in the UK, and in June by Macmillan, Putin's People: How the KGB Took Back Russia and Then Took On the West is an account of Russian president Vladimir Putin's rise to power, and the Kremlin's influence on the West.

Luke Harding (author of Shadow State: Murder, Mayhem and Russia's Remaking of the West), writing for The Guardian, described the book as "the most remarkable account so far of Putin's rise from a KGB operative to deadly agent provocateur in the hated west... This is a superb book. Its only flaw is a heavy reliance on well-placed anonymous sources."

The Economist named Putin's People as one of its books of the year in the category of politics and current affairs, saying "this [book] is the closest yet to a definitive account. It draws on extensive interviews and archival sleuthing to tell a vivid story of cynicism and violence." The Financial Times also chose it as one of its best books of 2020.

In March 2021, Roman Abramovich filed a lawsuit in London against Belton and her publisher, HarperCollins, for defamation. Harbottle & Lewis represented Abramovich over the matter. Belton, on the account of three former Abramovich associates, alleges that Abramovich acquired Chelsea Football Club in 2003 under Putin's instructions. The libel suit was settled with an apology from the publishers. Although the book carried a denial from him, future editions will explain Abramovich's motivations in more detail.

Further lawsuits have been brought against HarperCollins by Mikhail Fridman, Petr Aven; and against both the author and publisher by Shalva Chigirinsky, and Rosneft. HarperCollins have stated they will "robustly defend" the actions. Nick Cohen in The Observer described the litigation as "a pile-on from Russian billionaires on a scale this country has never witnessed" adding "London’s lawyers are hard at work. Carter-Ruck, CMS, Harbottle & Lewis and Taylor Wessing have a billionaire apiece in a kind of socialism of the litigious."

== See also ==
- Karen Dawisha
