= Moneyland =

2018 book by Oliver Bullough

Moneyland: The Inside Story of the Crooks and Kleptocrats Who Rule the World
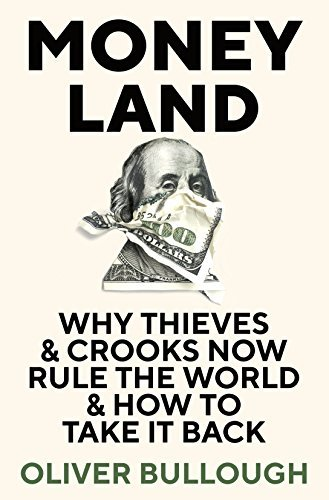
- First edition cover
- Author: Oliver Bullough
- Language: English
- Subject: Money Laundering
- Genre: Investigative journalism
- Publisher: Profile Books (UK), St. Martin's Press (US)
- Publication date: November 8, 2018
- Publication place: United Kingdom, United States
- Media type: Print (Hardcover) and ebook
- Pages: 304
- ISBN: 9781250621467

Moneyland: The Inside Story of the Crooks and Kleptocrats Who Rule the World is a 2018 book by British writer Oliver Bullough about 'Moneyland', which he defines as a metaphorical virtual space and secret country that is used by kleptocratic governments and the lawless super-wealthy to steal, conceal and spend wealth with the aid of offshore financial centres, money laundering and tax evasion.

Bullough argues that 'Moneyland' is key to the flow of anonymous and uncontrolled money into politics, which contributes to a broad loss of trust in democratic processes and the spread of political instability. He also highlights the role of Western legal and financial institutions and consultancies in enabling and obscuring these acts, and emphasises the need for greater global regulation.

Moneyland was well-received, garnering praise for its accessible writing and detailed insight, however some criticism was aimed at the scant discussion of solutions to the issues discussed in the book. The book was shortlisted for the 2019 Orwell Prize.

The concept of 'Moneyland' has been used in reference to state capture, and the three-step process of kleptocracy ('steal-hide-spend') outlined in the book has been further explored in academic research. The book has been cited as part of research that identifies significant faults in the efficacy of UK and US regulatory regimes aimed at preventing corruption funds from entering the international financial system.

In September 2021, Angolan vice-president Bornito de Sousa and his daughter sued Bullough and his publisher in Portugal for defamation, seeking €750,000 in legal claims. The case was dismissed in 2024.

== Summary ==
The book begins in 2014 with the author's tour through the Mezhyhirya Residence, the former estate of ex-Ukrainian president Viktor Yanukovych that has been repurposed as a museum displaying Yanukovych's luxurious lifestyle. The second chapter describes the birth of Moneyland via the establishment of the Bretton Woods system and Siegmund Warburg's role in establishing the Eurobond, which allowed owners to transport and redeem them anywhere while paying tax-free interest. The third chapter describes the gatekeepers of Moneyland via the author's visit to the Caribbean island of Nevis, detailing the role of offshore financial centres in asset protection, fraud, money laundering, and obstruction of financial transparency and regulatory compliance. The use of trusts in Jersey is also examined.

The fourth chapter utilises the Yury Skuratov scandal and his disclosure of FIMACO, a Jersey shell company used by top Russian Communist Party officials, to demonstrate how the power of Moneyland is wielded at a state level. The fifth chapter describes company mills such as Formations House in London that create and register corporate entities for clients. The sixth chapter discusses the use of shell corporations to shield assets, using the corruption cases of ex-president of Zambia Frederick Chiluba, ex-president of Uzbekistan's daughter Gulnara Karimova, and alleged money laundering by Raúl Salinas with the aid of Citibank.

The seventh chapter looks at corruption in Ukraine's healthcare system via interviews with mothers of child cancer patients, doctors, a Security Service of Ukraine agent, and anti-corruption lawyers. The author also describes a legal case by the U.S. Securities and Exchange Commission against Teva Pharmaceuticals, where the company paid $519 million to settle charges alleging payments to Ukrainian officials in charge of drug procurement.

The eighth chapter examines how corruption originates in developing countries and former colonies, citing statesman S. Rajaratnam, sociologist Stanislav Andreski, Nigerian author Chinua Achebe, and political theorist Francis Fukuyama. Using the corruption of Equatoguinean President Obiang and his use of Western lawyers and bankers as an example, the author highlights that Westerners are not only passive observers of corruption, but active enablers.

The ninth chapter focuses on immigrant investor programs as the author visits a conference organised by Henley & Partners, the company that pioneered the industry of selling citizenship and passports. The tenth chapter looks at the use of diplomatic immunity as a way to gain legal immunity through the case of Saudi businessman Walid Juffali. Other notable holders of diplomatic immunity include Nigerian oil minister Diezani Alison-Madueke (Dominican diplomatic credentials) and Chinese billionaire Xiao Jianhua (Antigua and Barbuda diplomatic passport).

The eleventh chapter explains the use of English defamation law for "libel tourism", a defence mechanism of Moneyland that enables claimants to protect against public exposure of questionable behaviour. Examples given include the book Putin's Kleptocracy and an unsuccessful defamation case against financier Bill Browder. The chapter also describes a "reputation laundering" industry in the UK comprising PR agencies, law firms and consultancies.

The twelfth chapter describes attempts to pursue and return stolen money to countries that were or are ruled by kleptocrats, specifically focusing on Ukraine after the 2014 Revolution of Dignity. The thirteen chapter uses the death of Alexander Litvinenko as an example of the extreme methods that Moneylanders can use to defend themselves, i.e. by preventing information on financial misconduct by killing whistleblowers.

The fourteenth and fifteenth chapter examines how money from Moneyland is spent, beginning with an episode of Say Yes to the Dress featuring Angolan politician Bornito de Sousa's daughter Naulila Diogo who spent $200,000 on bridal dresses, and continuing with luxury property such as 15 Central Park West, Indian Creek, Florida, and Turnberry Ocean Club Residences. The sixteenth chapter discusses the effect of plutonomy (defined as economies where the wealthy have a disproportionate share of the assets) on global markets. It also described how graft crackdowns such as the 2012 Chinese anti-corruption campaign led to declines in sales of luxury goods.

The seventeenth chapter examines the effects of the 2007 Birkenfeld Disclosure alleging suspected tax evasion by Swiss bank UBS. Due to the revelations and other similar scandals, the Foreign Account Tax Compliance Act was passed. The eighteenth chapter describes tax havens in the United States such as in Delaware and Nevada, and the final chapter documents the various efforts of different jurisdictions in corporate regulation aimed to fight tax dodging and corruption. The author concludes that "the tension between democratic sovereignty in nation states and the need for international cooperation to control financial flows – will not go away, and will remain a point of opportunity for anyone keen to develop and expand Moneyland".

== Reception ==
The Economist called the book a "devastating exposé" and named it the politics and current affairs book of the year. In The Guardian, Tim Adams described it as "meticulously researched and fantastically disturbing". In the same publication, Andy Beckett stated Moneyland was "concise, confident...full of such jaw-dropping examples...far more entertaining than you’d expect of a work on this subject", concluding that "if you still have any illusions about the wonders of liberated capitalism, Moneyland will probably cure you." The Times similarly praised the book for its detailed insight. However, both reviewers criticised the scant discussion of solutions to the topics raised in the book.

The New Statesman reviewed Moneyland positively and described the book as a model for telling a gripping story about a complex subject, stating that "You cannot understand power, wealth and poverty without knowing about Moneyland" but noted its pessimistic conclusion despite its subtitle. The New York Times commended the book for its investigative research, but questioned Bullough's assertion that Moneyland represented an existential threat to democracy, stating that "Like all polemics, this one is strong on passion, but even with ample examples, the assertion that Moneyland is a fatal rot does not make it so."

Moneyland has been listed among the key works covering illicit financial flows, with academics noting that despite the global scale of the problem, the majority of work examining these issues were from NGOs and small groups of investigative journalists and activists, rather than governments or international agencies. An academic analysis of refugees and wealth refuges argued that Moneyland, alongside No Friend But the Mountains and Treasure Islands, "exemplify the journalism of exposure that does important work to counter the conceptual distance between the average citizen and the super-rich or refugee, and between mainland decision-making and islands of refuge."

The book was shortlisted for the 2019 Orwell Prize.

== Defamation lawsuit ==
On 29 September 2021, Press Gazette reported that Angolan vice-president Bornito de Sousa and his daughter Naulila Diogo had sued Bullough and his Portuguese publisher 20/20 Editora in Portugal for libel, seeking €525,000 with an additional €225,000 from the publisher, totaling €750,000 in legal claims. The author and his UK publisher Profile Books had previously received a threat of legal action in March 2021, which Bullough's lawyer dismissed as having no merit.

On 9 January 2024, the Sintra Central Civil Court acquitted Bullough and his publisher on the ground that the plaintiffs "were unable to prove that the [book] was not based on concrete and objective facts." De Sousa and his daughter appealed the decision, which was dismissed by the Lisbon Court of Appeal on 12 September 2024, with the plaintiffs ordered to pay the legal costs.

== See also ==
- Kleptopia (2020)
- Russian money in London
- Kleptocracy tour
