= Russia Tower =

- Башня Россия
- Rendered model of the skyscraper project Russia Tower
- Interactive map of the Russia Tower area

General information
- Status: Never built
- Type: Mixed use
- Location: Moscow, Russia
- Coordinates: 55°45′5″N 37°32′4″E
- Construction started: 18 September 2007
- Construction stopped: 21 November 2008
- Cost: over $3 billion
- Owner: Russian Land

Height
- Roof: 612 m (2,008 ft)

Technical details
- Floor count: 118
- Floor area: 350,000 m^{2} (3,800,000 sq ft)
- Lifts/elevators: 101

Design and construction
- Architect: Norman Foster, Baron Foster of Thames Bank
- Developer: Russian Land
- Structural engineer: Halvorson and Partners
- Main contractor: Satori (site preparation); Soletanshstroy (Soletanche Bachy) (Diaphragm wall, 0 level)

The Russia Tower (Russian: Башня Россия; Bashnya Rossiya) was a skyscraper project planned for the Moscow International Business Center in Moscow, Russia. It was started but eventually was cancelled due to the 2008 financial crisis. It was replaced by the Neva Towers project.

== Development ==
The original idea for the building was proposed in 1994. Since then, the tower's planned location changed five times. One of the proposed concepts, by Norman Foster, was meant to reach a height of 1 km (0.62 mi); however, that concept was cancelled by the Mayor of Moscow, Yury Luzhkov.

In 2006, at the Pushkin Museum in Moscow, proposed designs of the Russia Tower were presented. The model by Norman Foster won. This 2006 version had a height of 612 m and 118 floors. Construction began in September 2007, with a planned completion date of 2012, which was later postponed to 2016.

The total area of the structure would have covered 520,000 m^{2} (5,600,000 sq ft), of which approximately 200,000 m^{2} (2,200,000 sq ft) would have been underground. The tower would have contained 118 floors, 101 elevators, and 3,680 underground parking spaces. Commercial retail shops would have been located at the base of the building. The maximum capacity of the building was projected to be around 30,000 people.

The tower's development company froze the project and halted construction in November 2008, suspended it in February 2009, and officially cancelled it in June 2009. The 2008 financial crisis led to problems in financing the project.

== Financial and business history ==
The Russia Tower was proposed to be built on plots 2 and 3 of the Moscow International Business Center in 1994, and was intended to be the world's tallest building: a 648 m (2,126 ft), 125-story tower. It was designed by the Chicago-based architecture firm Skidmore, Owings and Merrill.

Its building site was soon moved to plot 14. In the middle of 2003 an updated, 648 m (2,126 ft), 134-story design had been approved and the site moved to plots 17 and 18. In January 2004, the Moscow Development Company (STT Group) was appointed as the main investor and developer of the US$2-billion project.

On 18 September 2007, the building's cornerstone was laid in a groundbreaking ceremony.

Russian news agency Interfax reported on 21 November 2008 that construction on the tower was to be halted. Shalva Chigirinsky, head of the tower's development company, indicated that the 2008 financial crisis had left him unable to secure financing for the project and had also removed demand for the tower's office space, even if the building were able to be completed.

On 3 December 2008, the Russian oil company Sibir Energy agreed to buy a number of real estate assets, including Russia Tower, from Chigirinsky. As Chigirinsky was a major shareholder in Sibir Energy, the purpose of the purchase was to alleviate financial pressures upon him, so that he would not be forced to sell his company shares, which would in turn enable the company to preserve its existing shareholder structure.

However, many business news analysts decried the move, arguing that such use of the oil company's business capital to assist Chigirinsky by purchasing his economically distressed real estate assets—which had no relation to the company's core oil business—at possibly inflated prices was detrimental to the company's shareholders and constituted a significant conflict of interest.

On 12 February 2009, it was announced that the Russia Tower would most likely not be built. The project developer's assistant stated that, "In today's economy, a project of such scale is no longer feasible for us and can no longer be justified." In place of the tower, the company proposed to use the land to build three smaller skyscrapers and a large parking garage.

In June 2009, the project was officially cancelled, to be turned into a parking lot for existing buildings. However, by 2020, smaller buildings, the Neva Towers, were built on the site.
