= Oliver Bullough =

British writer

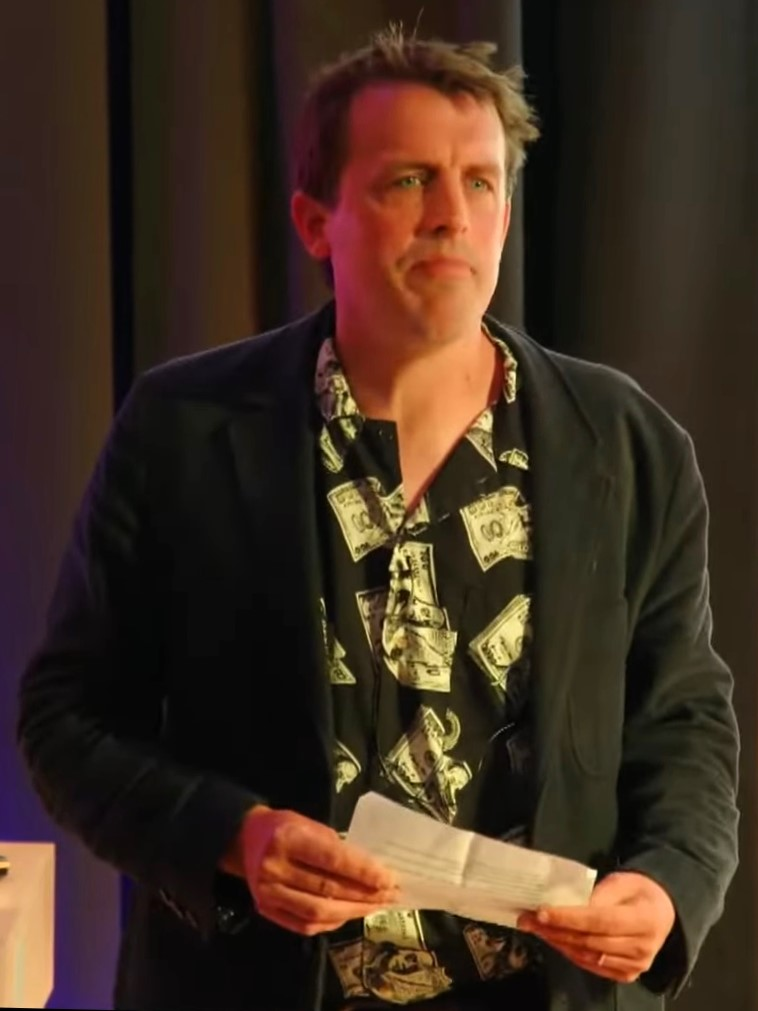
- Bullough speaks at the British Library in 2022
- Born: September 1977 (age 48); United Kingdom
- Education: Oxford University
- Occupations: Journalist, author
- Writing career
- Period: 1999–present
- Genre: Nonfiction
- Subjects: Kleptocracy, financial crime, money laundering
- Notable works: Moneyland: Why Thieves And Crooks Now Rule The World And How To Take It Back, No Logo

Oliver James Bullough CF (/ˈbʊloʊ/; born September 1977) is a British writer. He is the author of five books, with topics ranging from Russia to kleptocracy and financial crime.

In 2018, he wrote Moneyland: Why Thieves And Crooks Now Rule The World And How To Take It Back, which has been cited in various academic papers studying kleptocracy and anti-corruption policies. A follow-up book titled Butler to the World: How Britain Helps the World's Worst People Launder Money, Commit Crimes, and Get Away with Anything was released in 2022.

== Early life ==
Bullough was born in 1977 and grew up on a sheep farm in Mid Wales. He studied history at Oxford University.

== Career ==
After leaving university, Bullough first acted in a friend's Edinburgh Fringe play. In 1999, he bought the Lonely Planet Guide to Russia, took a Russian language course, and got hired by a Saint Petersburg English language magazine. After a year, Bullough was employed by The Times of Central Asia, in Bishkek, Kyrgyzstan.

Bullough later worked as a journalist for Reuters. He also covered the war in Chechnya.

In 2011, he wrote Let Our Fame Be Great,, a book set in the Caucasus Mountains which was nominated for the Orwell Prize,. In 2014, he wrote The Last Man in Russia which followed a dissident Orthodox priest across Russia, which was nominated for the Dolman Prize and won the Overseas Press Club's Cornelius Ryan Award.

His later books focused on financial crime. In 2018, he acted as a guide for kleptocracy tours in London. In the same year, he wrote Moneyland: Why Thieves And Crooks Now Rule The World And How To Take It Back, which was shortlisted for the 2019 Orwell Prize. In 2022, he wrote Butler to the World: How Britain Helps the World's Worst People Launder Money, Commit Crimes, and Get Away with Anything.

His work has appeared at the Institute for War and Peace Reporting, and in GQ, Granta, and The Guardian.

== Personal life ==
He returned to Britain in 2006. He is fluent in Russian.

== Publications ==
- Let Our Fame Be Great: Journeys Among The Defiant People Of The Caucasus (2011). ISBN 978-0-141-03774-5
- The Last Man in Russia (2014). ISBN 978-0-141-39949-2
- Moneyland: The Inside Story of the Crooks and Kleptocrats Who Rule the World (2018). ISBN 978-8-417-33368-3
- Butler to the World: How Britain Became the Servant of Tycoons, Tax Dodgers, Kleptocrats and Criminals (2022). Profile. ISBN 978-1-788-16587-7
- Everybody Loves Our Dollars: How Money Laundering Won (2026). ISBN 978-1-399-61809-0
