= Londongrad (disambiguation) =

Londongrad is a nickname of London, alluding to high presence of Russians in the United Kingdom, especially in reference to Russian money in London.

It may also refer to:

- Londongrad: From Russia with Cash; The Inside Story of the Oligarchs, a 2009 book by Mark Hollingsworth and Stewart Lansley
- Londongrad (novel), a 2010 novel by Reggie Nadelson
- Londongrad. L'ulitma spia the Spanish title of Alan S. Cowell's book The Terminal Spy: A True Story of Espionage, Betrayal and Murder
- Londongrad (TV series), a 2015 comedy drama about Russians in London, shown on STS (TV channel)
- Londongrad, a podcast series by Tortoise Media
