= Sibir Energy =

- Company type: Private
- Industry: Oil and gas industry
- Founded: 1996
- Headquarters: London, UK; Moscow, Russia
- Key people: Vadim Yakovlev (Chairman); Igor Tsibelman (CEO)
- Products: Petroleum; Petroleum products
- Revenue: US$1.77 billion (2007)
- Operating income: US$195 million (2007)
- Net income: US$282 million (2007)
- Number of employees: 3,200
- Parent: Gazprom Neft
- Website: www.sibirenergy.com

Sibir Energy was AIM-listed British oil company, whose primary line of business is petroleum and natural gas exploration in Siberia, Russia. Since February 2011, it is a wholly owned subsidiary of Gazprom Neft. In February 2016, Gazprom completely liquidated Sibir Energy as a separate company.

== History ==
Sibir was founded in 1996, and since then it had pursued an integrated model for its business operations by retaining a focus on retail as well as its core exploration, extraction and refinery activities.

On 21 August 2009, Gazprom Neft made a bid to take over all shares in Sibir Energy. On 15 February 2011, it announced becoming the only shareholder in Sibir Energy after the withdrawal of the Moscow government-controlled Central Fuel Company. The Central Fuel Company The received $740 million for its stake

In February 2016, Gazprom announced that it had completely liquidated Sibir Energy as a separate company as part of its asset restructuring.

== Operations ==
The company's primary assets are Salym oil fields in Nefteyugansk area operated by Salym Petroleum Development, a 51% voting share in Moscow Oil Refinery, operated in partnership with Gazprom Neft, and a substantial interest in Moscow-based gasoline retail networks. Through its subsidiary, Magma, Sibir Energy has interests in the Yuzhnoye and Orekhovskoye fields in West Siberia. It owns the Moscow Oil and Gas Company (formerly: The Moscow Oil Company).

== Listing ==
Before takeover by Gazprom Neft, Sibir Energy's shares were traded on the Alternative Investment Market. The largest shareholders were Gazprom Neft and the Moscow city government together with the Bank of Moscow. A minor stake was held by Sberbank, pledged as loan collateral by Russian businessman Shalva Chigirinsky.

== Management ==
Chairman of the company is Vadim Yakovlev and CEO is Igor Tsibelman. Non-executive directors are Dmitry Bekker, Maxim Viktorov and Andrei Martianov.

== Investigations ==
In late February 2009, Sibir Energy suspended its chief executive with immediate effect and launched an investigation into property dealings that the company had agreed with one of its former largest shareholders Shalva Chigirinsky. The company is suing Shalva Chigirinsky for at least US$325 million for a failed bid to sell his real estate assets to the company.

On July 8, 2009, Russian police raided into the company's Moscow office and took away some corporate documents.

== See also ==
- Petroleum industry in Russia
