= Omsk refinery =

Oil refinery in Omsk, Russia

Omsk Refinery
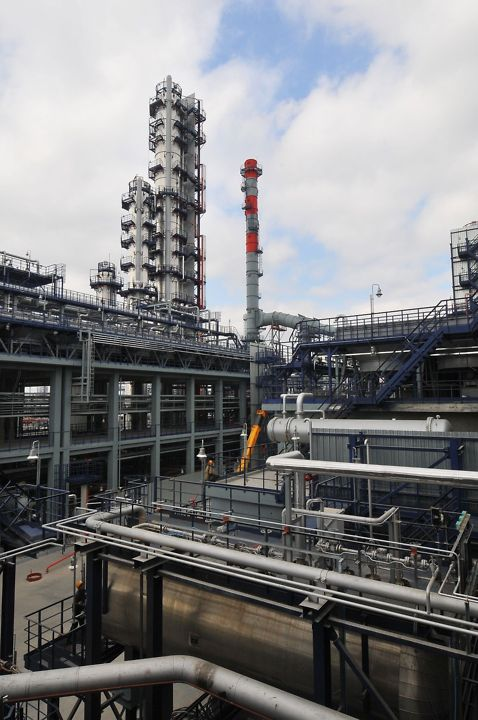

- Location within Omsk Oblast Location within Russia
- Interactive map of Omsk Refinery
- Location: Omsk, Russia; 55°04′16″N 73°14′04″E

Refinery details
- Operator: Gazprom Neft
- Opened: 1955
- No. of employees: ~3,600
- Website: onpz.gazprom-neft.ru

The Omsk Refinery (Russian: Омский нефтеперерабатывающий завод) is Russia's largest oil refinery plant.

Originally built by the Soviet Union during the 1950s, the refinery has belonged to the Russian state-owned company Gazprom since 1995 through its subsidiary Gazprom Neft.

The refinery produces over 50 different types of oil products, including gasoline, jet fuel, bitumen, and natural gas. Their products generally follow European emission standards. Its aromatics complex produces a range of aromatics of high purity: benzene (99.98% purity), p-Xylene (99.95% purity) and o-Xylene (99.6% purity).

Following a long range Ukrainian drone strike, the refinery halted operations as of 7 July 2026.

== History ==
=== Soviet period ===
In 1949, Soviet authorities approved construction of an oil refinery near the city of Omsk. The refinery started operations on 6 September 1955, and began processing gasoline by 1959. It was subordinate to the Ministry of Oil Industry from 1951 to June 1957, then to the Omsk Sovnarkhoz's Oil Industry Directorate from July 1957 to 1962.

Feedstock from Bashkortostan was initially processed at Omsk. Feedstock from Siberia followed in 1964. Later feedstocks were delivered through the Ust-Balyk–Omsk pipeline.

=== Post-Soviet modernization ===
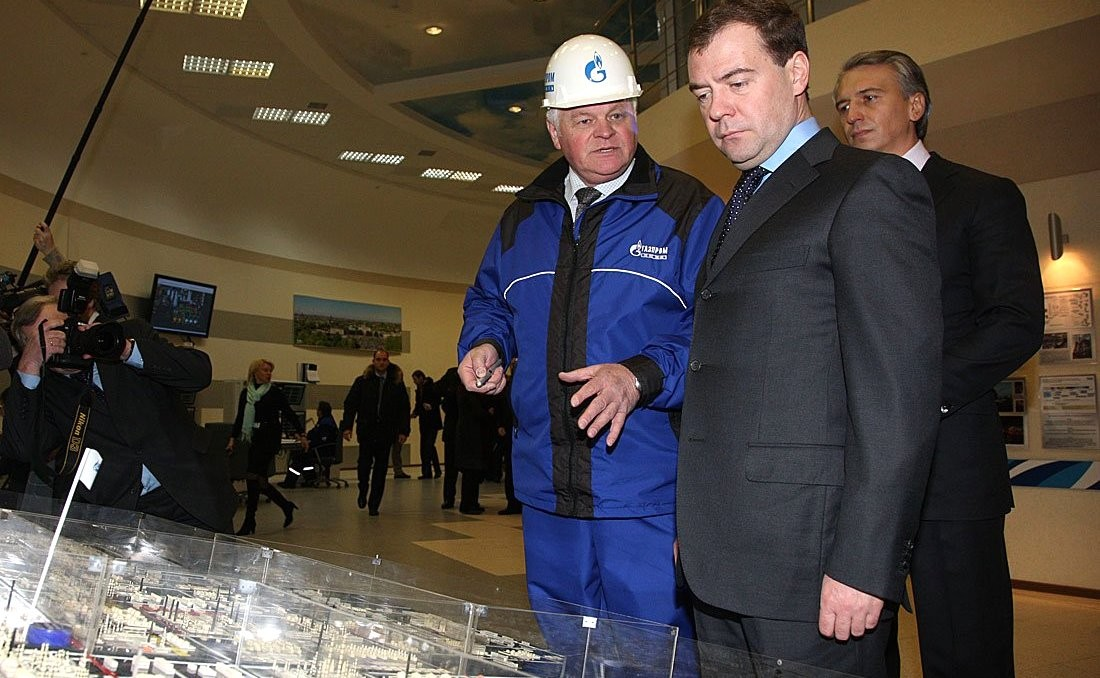
Russian President Dmitry Medvedev visiting the refinery, 12 February 2010

A unit commissioned in 1994 enabled the refinery to process heavy oil and to increase oil conversion rates to 85%.

As of 2021, the refinery could process 22 million tons of refined petroleum products per year and the capital invested to date in the plant was 60 billion rubles.

As of 2021, the refinery was able to produce 300,000 tons of internationally-certified Jet A-1 jet fuel per year. The refinery was then able to regulate "production levels for automobile and aviation fuels, as well as raw materials for lubricants. The central hydrocracking portion of the advanced oil refining complex (AORC) also will ensure further processing of heavy petroleum fractions into diesel fuel, jet fuel, and other high-quality products in compliance with Euro 5-quality standards". The refinery now complied fully with the clean air and ecology regulations adopted under a decree of May 2018, and was fitted out with sulfur-removal technologies in order to remove 99.8% of sulfur compounds.

=== Russo-Ukrainian War period ===
On 25 April 2024, a major fire broke out at the Omsk Refinery involving three rail cars carrying petroleum, which required the deployment of firefighting trains to contain the blaze.

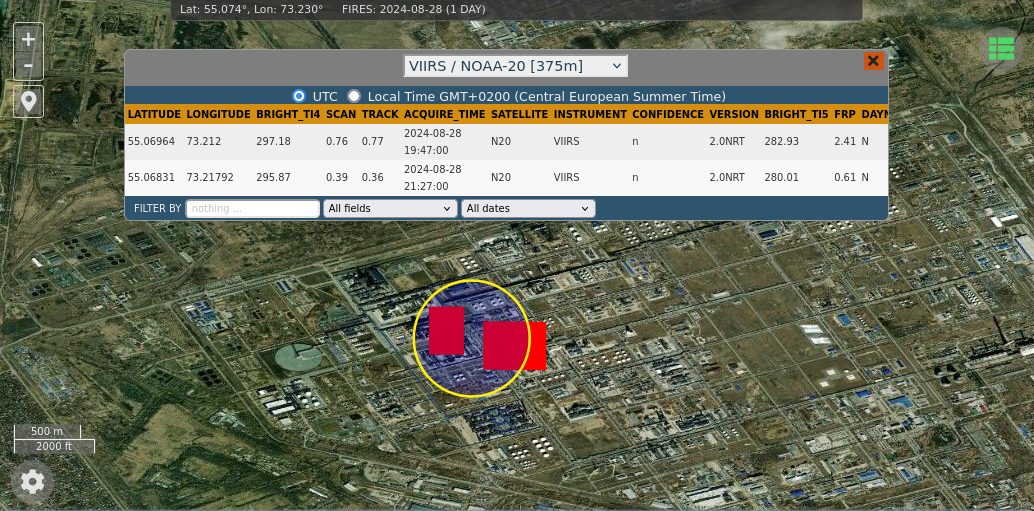
The oil refinery fires were detected by NASA's FIRMS on 28 August 2024.

On 26 August 2024, an explosion and subsequent fire burned an area of approximately 1,000 square metres (11,000 sq ft) and injured seven workers, one of whom later died. The incident damaged the CDU-11 crude distillation unit, which accounted for roughly one-third of the facility's active refining capacity.

On 6 July 2026, the refinery was attacked by long-range Ukrainian drones operated by Special Operations Forces, marking the first time the Siberian facility was struck during the conflict. The unmanned aerial vehicles (UAVs), reported to be Fire Point FP-1 drones, traveled approximately 2,500 to 3,000 km (1,600 to 1,900 mi) from Ukrainian territory to conduct the strike. The attack triggered fires in the primary crude processing infrastructure, specifically hitting the crude distillation unit CDU-10 with a capacity of 24,580 tons per day or about 38% of the refinery capacity. CDU-11, 24,000 tons per day or 37% of refinery capacity, was also shut down, although a Russian source said it could resume operation in the near future. Local regional governor Vitaly Khotsenko confirmed that emergency response operations were dispatched to the northern industrial district following the drone arrivals. On 7 July, the refinery announced a halt to operations following the drone strikes.

On 8 October 2026, Ukrainian defense forces targeted the plant a second time using upgraded long-range drones, sparking a fire at the facility.

On 11 November 2026, Ukraine's Special Operations Forces targeted the refinery for the 3rd time in an eight-hour long-range drone attack.

== See also ==
- List of oil refineries
- Petroleum industry in Russia
