= Kleptopia =

Book by Tom Burgis published 2020

Kleptopia: How Dirty Money Is Conquering the World
- Author: Tom Burgis
- Language: English
- Subject: Non-fiction
- Genre: True Crime, Business, Politics
- Publisher: HarperCollins Books
- Pages: 464

Kleptopia: How Dirty Money Is Conquering the World by Tom Burgis is a non-fiction book about the combined effects of globalization and worldwide forces of corruption, published in 2020. The book uses narrative nonfiction and true crime tropes to detail and explore global kleptocractic effects and consequences – with Kazakhstan in particular "featur[ing] heavily in Burgis's investigation" – as well as how practices of corruption (such as money laundering) entrench themselves via shell corporations, the dark money banking system, and political lobbying. Burgis anchors the book with the stories of four individuals, which the Financial Times described as "elegantly woven together and delivered in a form that makes the technicalities of finance accessible to the non-expert."

On 9 September 2021, it was reported that mining company Eurasian Natural Resources Corporation (ENRC), parent Eurasian Resources Group, had taken legal action against the publishers in respect of claims made in the book that was later dismissed.

== Reception ==
A reviewer for The Times of London described the book as "meticulously reported piece of investigative journalism, it is written in the style of a fast-paced thriller." A Washington Post article notes, "Burgis is a strong storyteller. We can visualize diamonds smuggled in a toothpaste tube for Swiss banking clients. We see a lawyer taking SIM cards with important contacts from her oligarch client and concealing them in a candy wrapper as he fled one snowy night on a private plane from his home country for asylum in London." The book was also listed as one of the publication's 50 notable works of nonfiction for 2020.

The Guardian's review voiced some criticism over the various plots and storylines followed in the book: "This is a ghastly and very important story. But the secret to great storytelling is knowing what to leave out. If Burgis had found a more focused way to tell this one, he would have written a much more powerful book."

=== Legal action against publishers ===
On 9 September 2021, it was reported that ENRC had taken legal action against HarperCollins and The Financial Times, with respect to claims made within the book and subsequent reportage. The claim was dismissed in March 2022.

== See also ==
- Moneyland (2018)
- Kleptocracy Tour
