= Peter Carter-Ruck =

English solicitor (1914–2003)

- Born: Peter Frederick Carter-Ruck; 26 February 1914; Steyning, Sussex, England
- Died: 19 December 2003 (aged 89); Great Hallingbury, Uttlesford, Essex, England
- Education: St Edward's School, Oxford
- Occupation: Solicitor
- Employer: Carter-Ruck
- Known for: Specialising in libel cases
- Spouse: Ann Maxwell (m. 1940; died 2003)
- Children: 2

Peter Frederick Carter-Ruck (26 February 1914 – 19 December 2003) was an English solicitor, specialising in libel cases. The firm he founded, Carter-Ruck, is still practising.

== Biography ==
=== Personal life ===
Carter-Ruck was educated at St Edward's School, Oxford. He spent three months in Germany during the 1930s, observing the rising popularity of Adolf Hitler and attending a rally in Freiburg. Upon his return, he trained and qualified as a solicitor.

His daughter Julie Scott-Bayfield also became a libel lawyer.

=== Career ===
He was senior partner, Oswald Hickson, Collier & Co (1945–1981) until he founded and was senior partner of his own eponymous firm, Peter Carter-Ruck and Partners (1981–1998). He was chairman, Law Society Law Reform Committee (1980–1983) and a fellow of the Society for Advanced Legal Studies (1998–2003).

Carter-Ruck's first major case was defending the Bolton Evening News successfully against a libel action brought by the Labour MP Bessie Braddock, who, the paper had claimed, had danced a jig in Parliament.

In December 1995, Carter-Ruck acted for the royal nanny Tiggy Legge-Bourke in the matter of an allegation by Diana, Princess of Wales, that Legge-Bourke had aborted a pregnancy in which Prince Charles was the father.

=== Criticism ===
In 1980, the Daily Express editor Derek Jameson was advised by Carter-Ruck that if he sued the BBC over their portrayal of him in a Week Ending sketch, he would win at least £25,000 in damages. The barrister in the case, David Eady QC, however advised Carter-Ruck to accept the BBC's offer to settle for £10 plus costs. Carter-Ruck did not disclose this advice to his client. The jury found the broadcast defamatory, but also fair comment and Jameson had to pay costs, receiving a bill for £41,342.50 from Carter-Ruck. Jameson learned by chance of the QC's advice and Carter-Ruck's former partner David Hooper said "Carter-Ruck told him a string of lies". Carter-Ruck later said he did not want to undermine Jameson's morale in court.

== Personal life ==
- A yachtsman, he owned a succession of boats which he christened Fair Judgment. He was a member of the Law Society Yacht Club, the Royal Ocean Racing Club, the Royal Yacht Squadron, and the Garrick.
- Carter-Ruck was the founder-governor of Shiplake College at Henley.
