= Butler to the World =

Financial services Book

Butler to the world
- First edition (UK)
- Author: Oliver Bullough
- Published: 14 June 2022 (US)
- Publisher: Profile Books (UK); St. Martin's Press (US)

Butler to the World: How Britain Became the Servant of Tycoons, Tax Dodgers, Kleptocrats and Criminals is a 2022 book written by Oliver Bullough in which he argues the United Kingdom found a new role for itself following the 1956 Suez Crisis as agent and facilitator to the powerful and wealthy globally.

== Reception ==
The book was longlisted in 2022 for the Business Book of the Year Award by the Financial Times.
