= Kleptocracy tour =

Tour of urban properties used for money-laundering by corrupt governments

Kleptocracy tour refers to tours of cities where financial flows from kleptocracies are being used to purchase residential property as a means of money-laundering.

The concept was founded by anti-corruption campaigners, started in London in February, 2016 and was modelled on the 'Beverly Hills-type tours of the homes of the stars'. The first tour focussed on properties owned by Russian, Ukrainian and Kazakh klepto-oligarchs congruent with the founders original area of expertise and awareness. The tour garnered widespread press coverage and sparked strong interest in subsequent tours in London and abroad.

The tours began in early February 2016, after the campaign for a public registry documenting the ultimate beneficial owners of London's offshore companies was rejected. They are organised by the campaign group ClampK which highlights both the local economic distortions caused by these capital inflows and the implicit corruption implied by facilitating this money-laundering by foreign kleptocrats. The tour is planned for expansion in Miami and New York City.

In 2018, British author Oliver Bullough acted as a kleptocacy tour guide in London and detailed his experience in the book Moneyland: Why Thieves And Crooks Now Rule The World And How To Take It Back.

== See also ==
- Russian money in London, colloquially known as "Londongrad"
- City Sightseeing
- Real estate in the United Kingdom
