= Putin's People =

Book by Catherine Belton

Putin's People: How the KGB Took Back Russia and Then Took On the West
- First edition
- Author: Catherine Belton
- Language: English
- Subject: Geopolitics
- Genre: Nonfiction
- Published: June 2020
- Publisher: HarperCollins
- Publication place: United States
- Media type: Hardcover
- Pages: 640
- ISBN: 978-0374238711

Putin's People: How the KGB Took Back Russia and Then Took On the West is a book authored by Catherine Belton, former Moscow correspondent for the Financial Times. The book discusses the rise to power of Vladimir Putin and the people around him. The publication of the book sparked a series of lawsuits by the individuals and organizations mentioned in it.

== Background ==
The book was written by British journalist Catherine Belton, who was a Moscow correspondent for the Financial Times and lived in Russia for 16 years, where she met oligarchs, government officials, intelligence officers and Kremlin insiders.

== Reception ==
The book was reviewed by Matthew J. of Office of the Director of National Intelligence in Studies in Intelligence, who stated, "On balance, this is a useful and thought-provoking book on the trajectory of post-Soviet Russia and the continued influence of the KGB inside the Kremlin."

Writing for The New York Times, Jennifer Szalai in her review questions that, "to read this book is to wonder whether a cynicism has embedded itself so deeply into the Anglo-American political classes that even the incriminating information it documents won’t make an actionable difference."

In March-April 2021, HarperCollins, the publisher of the book faced several libel lawsuits by Russian oligarchs Roman Abramovich (billionaire and owner of the Chelsea football club), Mikhail Fridman (co-owner of Alfa Group), Pyotr Aven (chairman of the board of directors of Alfa Bank), and Shalva Chigirinsky (businessman).

These lawsuits were settled, and the book now includes a section regarding Abramovich's motivations to buy the Chelsea football club.

== See also ==
- Bibliography of Vladimir Putin
- Bibliography of Russian history (1991–present)
- Putin's Kleptocracy (2014)
