= Karen Dawisha =

American political scientist (1949–2018)

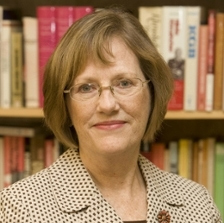
- Karen Dawisha in 2010
- Born: December 2, 1949; Colorado Springs, Colorado, U.S.
- Died: April 11, 2018 (aged 68); Oxford, Ohio, U.S.
- Education: Lancaster University; London School of Economics
- Occupations: Academic and author
- Spouse: Adeed Dawisha
- Writing career
- Notable work: Putin's Kleptocracy

Karen Dawisha (née Hurst, December 2, 1949 – April 11, 2018) was an American political scientist and writer. She was a professor in the Department of Political Science at Miami University in Oxford, Ohio, and the director of The Havighurst Center for Russian and Post-Soviet Studies.

== Early life and education ==
Dawisha was born in Colorado on December 2, 1949, as Karen Hurst to schoolteacher Paula Keene and Harry Hurst, who was a jazz pianist. She had three siblings, two brothers and a sister. After taking a course in the Russian language in High School, she became interested in Russia. She received a bachelor's degree in Russian politics from University of Colorado Boulder, taking a year at Lancaster University in England where she met her husband, Adeed Dawisha. She received her Ph.D. from the London School of Economics.

== Career ==
Dawisha served as an advisor to the British House of Commons Foreign Affairs Committee and as an International Affairs Fellow of the Council on Foreign Relations, and was a member of the Policy Planning Staff and the Bureau of Political Military Affairs of the U.S. State Department from 1985 to 1987. Until the summer of 2000 she was a professor in the Department of Government and Politics at the University of Maryland, College Park, where she served as the Director of its Center for the Study of Post-Communist Societies. In 2014, Dawisha received considerable attention for her work detailing the rise and crimes of Vladimir Putin.

=== Putin's Kleptocracy ===
Dawisha's 2014 book Putin's Kleptocracy: Who Owns Russia? (Simon & Schuster) has been called "a who's who of the people on the sanctions lists drawn up by America and the EU". It chronicles the rise of Vladimir Putin during his time in St. Petersburg in the 1990s. In the book, Dawisha exposed how Putin's friends and coworkers from his formative years accumulated massive wealth and power. Although Putin was elected with promises to rein in the oligarchs who had emerged in the 1990s, Dawisha wrote that Putin transformed "an oligarchy independent of, and more powerful than, the state into a corporatist structure in which oligarchs served at the pleasure of state officials, who themselves gained and exercised economic control... both for the state and for themselves". As a result, 110 individuals control 35% of Russia's wealth, according to Dawisha. Whereas scholars have traditionally viewed Putin's Russia as a democracy in the process of failing, Dawisha argues that "from the beginning Putin and his circle sought to create an authoritarian regime ruled by a close-knit cabal... who used democracy for decoration rather than direction."

Dawisha sought to publish Putin's Kleptocracy with Cambridge University Press (CUP), with which she had previously published five books and which had initially accepted the book; however, her 500-page manuscript, a quarter of which was evidentiary footnotes, was rejected by CUP. Editor John Haslam cited the legal risk of publishing the manuscript in an email of March 20, later published by Edward Lucas in The Economist magazine. Haslam wrote: "Given the controversial subject matter of the book, and its basic premise that Putin's power is founded on his links to organised crime, we are not convinced that there is a way to rewrite the book that would give us the necessary comfort". Dawisha responded that "one of the world's most important and reputable publishers declines to proceed with a book not because of its scholarly quality... but because the subject matter itself is too hot to handle". Dawisha clarified that her indignation was not directed at CUP but at the climate in Britain that allows "pre-emptive bookburning". The Financial Times pointed to "fear of the UK's claimant-friendly libel laws". Dawisha later took her manuscript to Simon & Schuster in the US, where the libel laws are less restrictive.

== Other works ==
Dawisha's other major publications include: Russia and the New States of Eurasia: The Politics of Upheaval (Cambridge University Press, coauthored with Bruce Parrott, 1994); Eastern Europe, Gorbachev and Reform: The Great Challenge, (Cambridge University Press, 1989, 2nd ed., 1990); The Kremlin and the Prague Spring, (California University Press, 1984); The Soviet Union in the Middle East: Politics and Perspectives, (Holmes and Meier for the Royal Institute for International Affairs, 1982); Soviet East-European Dilemmas: Coercion, Competition, and Consent, (Holmes and Meier for the Royal Institute for International Affairs, 1981); and Soviet Foreign Policy Toward Egypt, (Macmillan, 1979).

== Edited volumes ==
As Director of the Russian Littoral Project, Dawisha was the series editor (with Bruce Parrott) of the 10 volume "International Politics of Eurasia", published by M.E. Sharpe, and also edited several volumes in that series, including: Making of Foreign Policy in Russia and the New States of Eurasia, (coedited with Adeed Dawisha, 1995), The End of Empire? The Transformation of the USSR in Comparative Perspective, (coedited with Bruce Parrott); and The International Dimension of Post Communist Transitions in Russia and the New States of Eurasia, (1997).

Finally, she coedited with Bruce Parrott a four-volume series published by Cambridge University Press on Authoritarianism and Democratization in Post-communist Societies. The volumes are The Consolidation of Democracy in East Central Europe; Politics, Power and the Struggle for Democracy in South-East Europe; Conflict, Cleavage and Change in Central Asia the Caucasus; and Democratic Changes and Authoritarian Reactions in Russia, Ukraine, Belarus and Moldova.

== Awards and fellowships ==
Dawisha received Fellowships from the MacArthur Foundation, the Council on Foreign Relations, the British Council, and the Rockefeller Foundation. She was awarded the Distinguished Research Professor prize by the University of Maryland. Funding for the Russian Littoral Project and the Democratization Project came from the MacArthur Foundation, the Ford Foundation, Smith Richardson Foundation, the Social Science Research Council, Pew Charitable Trusts, the National Endowment for the Humanities, the American Council for Learned Societies and the State Department.

== Personal life ==
Karen Dawisha was married to Adeed Dawisha, a professor from Iraq who specializes in Middle Eastern politics, also at Miami University. The couple had two children, Nadia and Emile, and a grandson. They both retired from their academic posts in 2016. Karen Dawisha died in April 2018 from lung cancer.

== See also ==
- Catherine Belton
