= News of the World royal phone hacking scandal =

2005–07 British royal family scandal

A scandal developed in 2005 to 2007 around the interception of voicemail relating to the British royal family by a private investigator working for a News of the World journalist. It formed a prelude to the wider News International phone hacking scandal which developed in 2009 and exploded in 2011, when it became clear that the phone hacking had taken place on a much wider scale. Early indications of this in the police investigation were not followed through, and the failures of the police investigation would go on to form part of the wider scandal in 2011.

In August 2006, the News of the World's royal editor, Clive Goodman and a private investigator, Glenn Mulcaire, were arrested by the Metropolitan Police, and later charged with hacking the telephones of members of the royal family by accessing voicemail messages, an offence under section 79 of the Regulation of Investigatory Powers Act 2000. On 26 January 2007, both Goodman and Mulcaire pleaded guilty to the charges and were sentenced to four and six months imprisonment respectively. On the same day, it was announced that Andy Coulson had resigned as editor of the News of the World.

== Overview ==
=== Background ===
On 13 November 2005, an article appeared in the News of the World written by royal editor Clive Goodman, claiming that Prince William was in the process of borrowing a portable editing suite from ITV royal correspondent Tom Bradby. Following the publication, the Prince and Bradby met to try to figure out how the details of their arrangement had been leaked, as only two other people were aware of it. Prince William noted that another equally improbable leak had recently taken place regarding an appointment he had made with a knee surgeon. After some discussion, the Prince and Bradby concluded it was likely that their voicemails were being accessed.

Their concerns were passed to the Metropolitan Police, who set up an investigation under Deputy Assistant Commissioner Peter Clarke, who managed the Counter Terrorism Command. Clarke reported to Assistant Commissioner Andy Hayman, commander of the Specialist Operations directorate. The reason the investigation was passed to Hayman and Clarke was that Hayman's command included the Protection Command, under whom SO14 provide all Royalty Protection.

Clarke's investigation began as a localised incident involving staff at Clarence House, but the compiled list of possible victims broadened to include Government ministers; a Member of Parliament; military chiefs; a leading media figure; Premiership footballers; and celebrities. Clarke's investigation team searched the London office of the News of the World, eventually concluding that the compromised voice mail accounts belonged to Prince William's aides, including Jamie Lowther-Pinkerton, and not the Prince himself.

=== Goodman and Mulcaire trial ===
On 8 August 2006, Clarke's team arrested three men, including Goodman and former footballer turned private investigator Glenn Mulcaire. After releasing the third man, in consultation with the Crown Prosecution Service, Goodman and Mulcaire were charged with hacking the telephones of members of the royal family by accessing voicemail messages, an offence under section 79 of the Regulation of Investigatory Powers Act 2000. Goodman was subsequently suspended by the paper.

In September 2006 lawyers for News of the World parent company Newsgroup Newspapers told the police that

"Extensive searches have revealed the existence of only one piece of paper, enclosed herewith. No documents exist recording any work completed by Mr Mulcaire, monitoring of Mr Mulcaire's return of work, reporting structures or any persons for whom Mr Mulcaire provided information."

During the subsequent court hearing, the jury were told that Goodman and Mulcaire made a total of 609 calls to the royal staff members' numbers – 487 made by Goodman and 122 by Mulcaire. Over this period, the News of the World had paid Mulcaire £104,988 for his services, on top of which Goodman had additionally paid Mulcaire £12,300 in cash between 9 November 2005 and 7 August 2006, hiding Mulcaire's identity by using the code name Alexander on his expenses sheet. The court heard that Mulcaire had also hacked into the messages of supermodel Elle Macpherson; publicist Max Clifford; MP Simon Hughes; football agent Skylet Andrew; and the Professional Footballers' Association's Gordon Taylor.

On 26 January 2007, Mr Justice Gross jailed Goodman for four months, having previously pleaded guilty to the charges. His associate and private investigator Glenn Mulcaire, was imprisoned for six months. On the same day, it was announced that Andy Coulson had resigned as the editor of the News of the World a fortnight earlier. He was immediately replaced by former Sunday Mirror editor and previously executive editor of the New York Post, Colin Myler, hired by News International Chairman Les Hinton.

=== Unfair dismissal claim ===
Goodman subsequently filed an unfair dismissal claim against News Group Newspapers Limited, his former employer and the publisher of The Sun and the News of the World. Goodman started his claim against his former employer, engaging defence lawyer John Kelsey-Fry, on the grounds that the practice of phone hacking was widespread at the newspaper group. To defend their case, News International hired London-based media specialist solicitors Harbottle & Lewis.

During its work for News International, Harbottle & Lewis took possession of hundreds of internal emails. In a letter dated 29 May 2007, sent to News International head of legal affairs Jon Chapman, Lawrence Abramson of Harbottle & Lewis wrote that:

Re Clive Goodman: We have on your instructions reviewed the emails to which you have provided access from the accounts of: Andy Coulson; Stuart Kuttner; Ian Edmondson; Clive Goodman; Neil Wallis; Jules Stenson. I can confirm that we did not find anything in those emails which appeared to us to be reasonable evidence that Clive Goodman's illegal actions were known about and supported by both or either of Andy Coulson, the Editor, and Neil Wallis, the Deputy Editor, and/or that Ian Edmondson, the News Editor, and others were carrying out similar illegal procedures. Please let me know if we can be of any further assistance

This letter was subsequently used by various News International executives in their defence during a parliamentary investigation into phone hacking in 2009.

Chapman then wrote to News International chairman Les Hinton, that the company was likely to lose the case filed by Goodman, based on grounds of failing to follow specified contractual employment law procedure. This could result in a payment of £60,600 to Goodman, plus his notice period. Hinton therefore authorised an out-of-court settlement to Goodman, covering the sum indicated by Chapman, plus Goodman's legal costs. After settlement of Goodman's case, a similar amount was authorised to Mulcaire after he also started legal action, again settled out-of-court on Hinton's authorisation.

=== Subsequent legal cases ===
An agreement between News Group Newspapers and the royal family which would see William and Harry not take legal action in return for an apology was not honoured, which resulted in both brothers bringing a claim privately through their mutual attorneys. In October 2019, Harry pursued his case separately with a new solicitor and sued the now-defunct News of the World and its sister paper The Sun "in relation to alleged phone-hacking". William reached an out-of-court settlement with the publishers in 2020. Clive Goodman had previously stated that he had hacked William's phone on 35 occasions, his wife Catherine's on 155 occasions, and Harry's on 9 occasions. Harry reached an out-of-court settlement with the publishers in 2025 and received an apology.

== See also ==
- Overview of news media phone hacking scandals
- CTB v News Group Newspapers Ltd
- List of victims of the News International phone hacking scandal
- Mosley v News Group Newspapers Ltd
- Politico-media complex
- Sheridan v News Group Newspapers Ltd
