= Shalva Chigirinsky =

Russian businessman

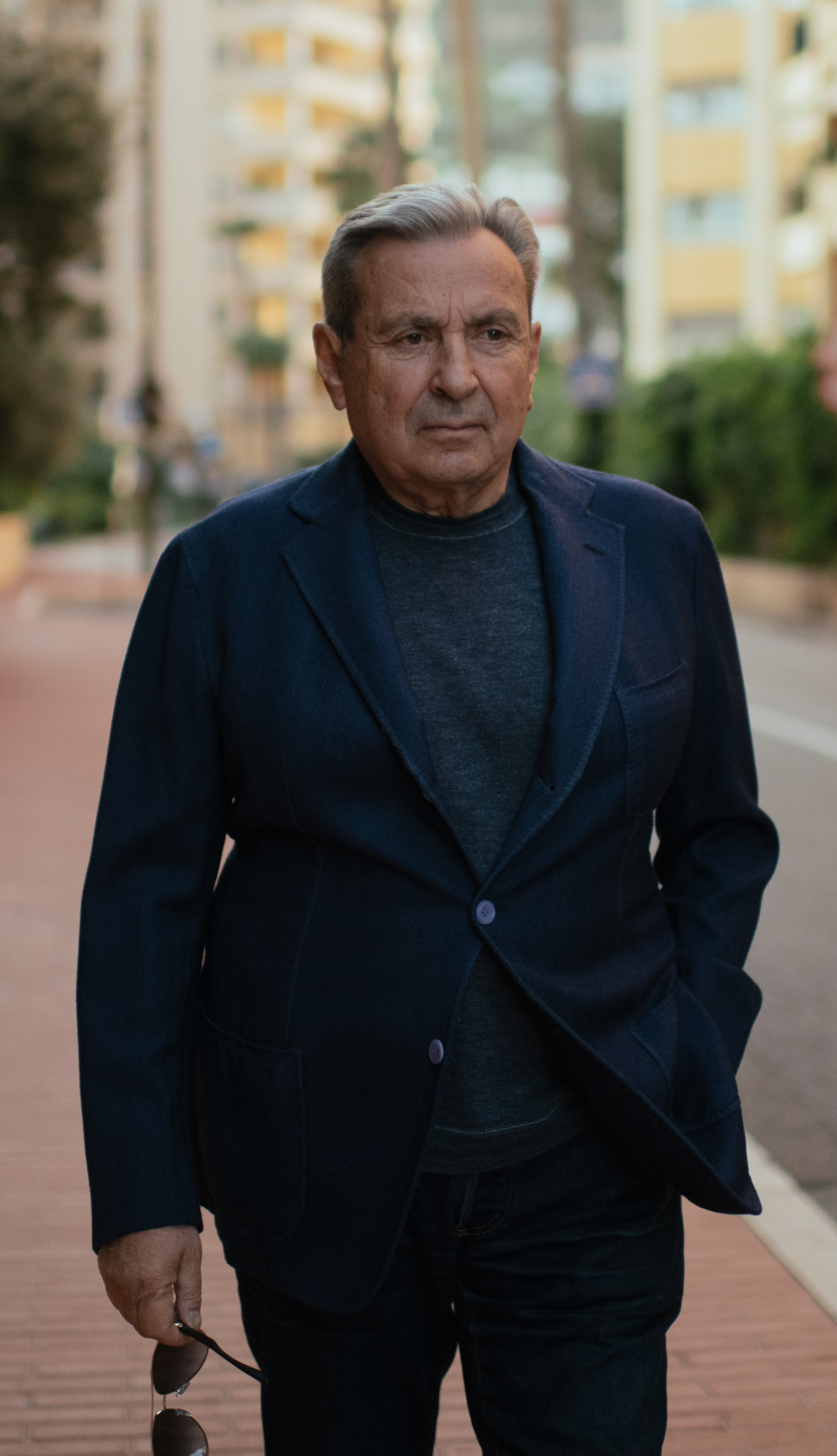
Shalva Chigirinsky in 2021

Shalva Chigirinsky (Russian: Шалва Павлович Чигиринский, born July 1, 1949) is an Israeli-Russian businessman, who was the major shareholder of AIM-listed British oil company Sibir Energy. As a principal owner of Russian Land Ltd, he was involved in the implementation of major development projects: the reconstruction of Hotel Rossiya, the construction of the Russia Tower in Moscow, the construction of the cultural and business center Crystal Island, and the reconstruction of New Holland Island in Saint Petersburg. In 2008, Forbes ranked him as the 524th richest person in the world and 58th on its list of Russian billionaires.

== Biography ==
Shalva Chigirinsky was born into a Georgian Jewish family on July 1, 1949, in Kutaisi. He attended the First State Medical University in Moscow during his post-secondary education.

In 1987, Chigirinsky moved to Spain, and then he relocated to Germany to engage in the real estate business. At that time, Chigirinsky met the banker Karl-Heinz Stock, with whom he became co-founder of the company S+T Group Handels GmbH, which carried out its activities in Russia.

=== Development business ===
After returning to Russia in the early 1990s, Chigirinsky, as the S+T Group Handels GmbH majority owner, managed construction and reconstruction of real estate projects, including Moscow's heritage landmarks. The businessman started his development activities back in the days of the first city mayor Gavriil Popov. The first landmark project in Moscow was an office block for the Moscow Complex of Urban Planning Policy and Construction in Nikitsky Lane. Back in the early 1990s, the businessman met Moscow Mayor Yury Luzhkov and his wife Yelena Baturina. As a result, he was able to ensure the growth of his development business. By 1997, Chigirinsky bought out Stock's share of the business and renamed the company ST Group, becoming chairman of the board of directors.

In 2001, Chigirinsky established the Moscow Development Company (MDC) on a parity basis with the Moscow Government. The most known MDC's projects were the construction of the International Business Center "Moscow City" and the establishment of Metro-Real retail chain of 20 hypermarkets, under an agreement with the German Metro Group.

In 2002, Shalva Chigirinsky transferred his assets in ST Group to his younger brother Alexander, who in 2007 renamed the company into Snegiri Group. The same year, Shalva Chigirinsky founded STT Group LLC, which became a co-owner of MDC on an equal footing with the Moscow Government.

In 2007, the businessman transferred all development projects to the portfolio of the Russian Land Ltd. The total floor space of projects Chigirinsky was involved in exceeded 2 million m^{2} by the middle of 2007. The largest units were constructions of the Russia Tower in Moscow City (400,000 m^{2}) and the multifunctional complex "Yugra" in Khanty-Mansiysk (161,000 m^{2}); reconstructions of the Rossiya Hotel (410,000 m^{2}) and New Holland Island in Saint Petersburg (68,000 m^{2}). Sir Norman Foster was invited as an architect for most of the units. Chigirinsky implemented some of the landmark projects in collaboration with Russian retail businessman Igor Kesaev and Viktor Rashnikov, the owner of the Magnitogorsk Iron and Steel Works.

Chigirinsky planned to list his company on the London Stock Exchange in 2008. In the preparation for the IPO, shareholders planned to subscribe stakes for 18—20% of the capital, with an expected capitalization of the company of about $10 billion. Thus, the placement volume could have reached $1.8—2 billion. According to Forbes, by that time, Chigirinsky had a net worth of US$2.5 billion, ranking him as the 44th richest Russian businessman.

=== Petroleum business ===
Alongside the development business, Chigirinsky entered the oil business market in the 1990s. Cooperating with BP in 1996, the businessman founded the Petrol Complex Company, which created a network of gas stations in Moscow under the BP brand. Chigirinsky owned 25% of the company.

In 1999, the businessman became the majority owner of the Evikhon and Yugraneft oil companies, which owned the unique South Priobskoye and Salym fields. In the same year he merged his oil assets with the British company Sibir Energy, listed on the London Stock Exchange (AIM), thanks to which he became its majority owner and director.

With the Moscow Government-owned Central Fuel Company (СFC), Chigirinsky founded the Moscow Oil Company (later — the Moscow Oil and Gas Company), taking over as its president in 2000. A year later, he headed CFC, which owned a majority voting stake of the Moscow Oil Refinery.

Chigirinsky, who maintained close contact with the Moscow mayor's office, was appointed CEO of Moscow Oil and Gas Company in 2003 and its president in 2004. Moscow Mayor Yury Luzhkov was the chairman of the company's board of directors.

In 2000, Shalva Chigirinsky and Roman Abramovich set up a joint venture, Sibneft-Yugra, half of which was owned by Sibir Energy subsidiary Yugraneft, with Sibneft becoming the other co-owner. Yugraneft contributed licenses for the South-Priobskoye and East-Palyanovskoye oil fields to the joint venture's charter capital. But in 2004, Chigirinsky discovered that Yugraneft's stake had been diluted to 0.98% after several additional issues in favor of companies affiliated with Sibneft. Sibir Energy claimed that it had not been informed of the emissions, and unsuccessfully contested the dilution in Russian and international courts.

The episode caused a spat between the Tchigirinskiys brothers — Shalva accused Abramovich's partner Alexander of connivance, which led to the dilution of assets.

In 2005, Chigirinsky sold half his interest in Sibir Energy to businessman Igor Kesaev, whom he had known since the early 1990s.

In the fall of 2007 Sibir Energy and the Moscow City Government merged their refining assets, as a result of which Sibir Energy became the owner of 100% of Moscow Oil and Gas Company which, in turn, owned 50.08% of Moscow Oil Refinery, 38% of Mosnefteproduct (a chain of oil depots and fuel stations near Moscow) and 100% of Moscow Fuel Company (a chain of fuel stations in Moscow). A total of 139 filling stations and fuel bases in the Moscow region were under the control of the merged company. In exchange, the Moscow Government received 18.03% of the company's common stock and an option to repurchase another 3.16% within a year and a half. The deal completed the creation of a vertically integrated oil company.

=== 2008 financial crisis ===
The fall in demand for real estate and the freezing of credit lines during the 2008 financial crisis had a negative impact on Chigirinsky's businesses.

In October 2008, it was announced that Sibir Energy made advances to purchase Sovietsky Hotel and the New Sovietskaya developments — the objects owned by Chigirinky's companies. In December 2008, the company, in which 18% stake was owned by the Moscow government, announced that it is considering to buy out the remaining development projects and assuming debt obligations of Chigirinsky's Russian Land. But in February 2009, Sibir Energy reconsidered its intentions and demanded from Chigirinsky return the funds already paid. Following that, the London Stock Exchange at the request of the company suspended trading in its shares. The situation was aggravated by the demands of the creditors who granted loans to Russian Land, with Chigirinsky and Gradison Consultants Inc. as guarantors for loans.

In 2009, Chigirinsky moved from Russia to Israel, of which he is a citizen. A year later, a settlement was concluded in London between Sibir Energy, Chigirinsky, and all of his creditors. However, the businessman lost his stake in the oil company and a significant part of his development assets. After a series of transactions, Gazprom Neft, the successor to Sibneft, took control of Sibir Energy. In 2011, Gazprom Neft acquired from the Moscow government its stake in the company for US$740 million, becoming the sole shareholder and integrating Sibir Energy into its structure.

In 2011 and 2012, he sold his stake in the Russia Tower and Hotel Rossiya projects to Rashnikov and Nader for US$60 million in total.

=== International projects ===
Chigirinsky moved to the U.S. in 2013 and engaged in real estate development. He was involved in the construction of the Margaritaville Resort Times Square, located at the corner of Seventh Avenue and West 40th Street in New York City. The 32-story hotel features 234 guestrooms, five restaurants and bars, a year-round outdoor heated pool, and a street-level Margaritaville retail store. Margaritaville Resort Times Square is a joint project of Shalva Chigirinsky and Soho Properties, founded by American businessman Sharif El-Gamal. Total construction costs hover around $370 million. The hotel is managed by Jimmy Buffett's Margaritaville. It was voted the "Best New Hotel 2021" on USA Today's 10 Best Readers' Choice Awards.

After the hotel opened, Shalva Chigirinsky said that the market of "walking distance resorts" or "vertical resorts" is extremely promising. And he announced plans to open a second similar project in Chicago. He and his partners are also working on projects to build similar hotels in Canadian cities, as well as in Tokyo, Hong Kong, and Singapore.

== Family and personal life ==
In 2003–2009, he was married to Tatyana Panchenkova. In the course of the couple's long-term divorce settlement followed up by courts in Russia and the United States, Panchenkova filed a lawsuit in Connecticut accusing her ex-husband of "physical, psychological and emotional abuse" over a span of 10 years. Additionally, she filed a separate case, seeking substantial post-divorce pay-offs allegedly owed due to the order of the Russian judge. However, in October 2014, a jury of the Waterbury Courthouse found Chigirinsky not guilty on all charges. In June 2014, Chigirinsky brought an action in the New York's Federal Court, accusing Panchenkova of illegal profiteering by selling a part of US$120 million art collection transferred to her on the children's benefits for trust management, as well as of the real estate concealment in the US during a divorce proceeding.

Above all, Panchenkova accused her ex-husband of child abuse. Based on pre-trial investigation results in 2016, the Court of Stamford issued an arrest warrant for Chigirinsky, who, although denying the charges, voluntarily presented himself to the police station. On March 17, the Connecticut Supreme Court released him on $50,000 bail. After considering the facts of the case, the Stamford Court issued an arrest warrant for Tatyana Panchenkova on charges of actions that "entailed the risk of harm to minors and their moral decay" in early June 2016. The warrant resulted from an expert examination, which proved that Panchenkova "manipulated her children to incite hatred towards their own father" and instructed them on "correct" answers in court. The custody case, which awarded Chigirinsky a right to contact the children, finished in August 2016.

In early February 2017, the Court of the State of Connecticut dismissed the case against Chigirinsky, finding him not guilty. The same year in November, ex-spouses settled their dispute over property in the US, and the case over supplementary payments was also dismissed.
