= Salym Petroleum Development =

Salym Petroleum Development N.V.
- Company type: Private Naamloze vennootschap
- Industry: Oil and gas industry
- Founded: 1996
- Headquarters: Moscow, Russia (incorporated in the Netherlands)
- Key people: Alexey Govzich (CEO)
- Parent: Shell plc, Gazprom Neft
- Website: www.salympetroleum.ru

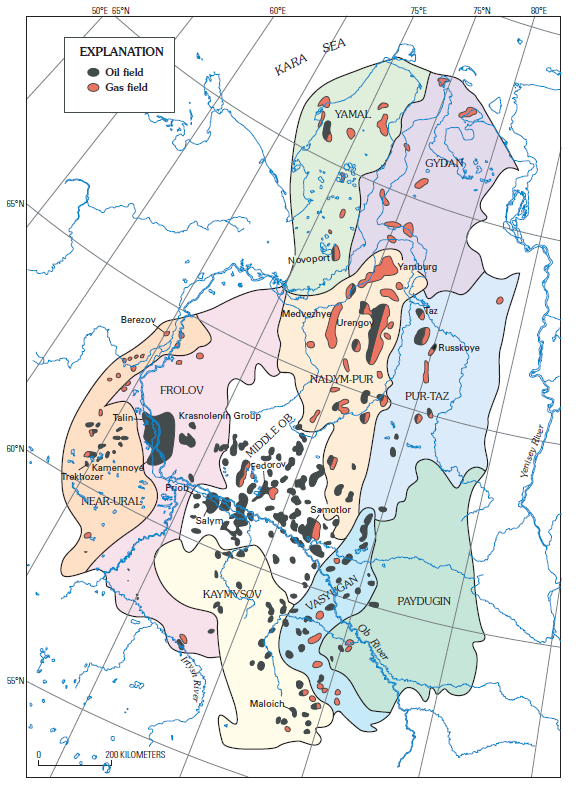
West Siberian petroleum basin oil and gas fields

Salym Petroleum Development, established in 1996, (Salym Petroleum Development, Salym Petroleum, SPD) is a joint venture between Gazprom Neft and Shell plc for development of the Salym group of oil fields in West Siberia. It is a joint-stock company incorporated under Dutch law (Naamloze vennootschap).

== History ==
Since 2003, Salym Petroleum Development (SPD) has been involved in the integrated development of three oil fields: West Salym, Upper Salym, and Vadelyp. They are located in the Khanty-Mansi Autonomous Okrug, 120 kilometres (75 mi) southwest of Surgut and 30 kilometres (19 mi) of Salym, respectively. The total recoverable oil reserves were at one point estimated to be 140 million tons, and the total area of licenses is about 2,141.4 kilometres (1,330.6 mi). In the summer of 2006 SPD exceeded an annual production volume 1 million tons, and In 2014 the company produced about 6.55 million tons of oil.

== Activities ==
A liquefied petroleum gas (LPG) plant was commissioned in May 2012 for associated petroleum gas processing. The project was implemented by a partner company, Monolit LLC (Rose of the World group). It currently receives petroleum gas from the Salym fields and the Shapsha group of fields, RussNeft holding the license for development of the latter. Currently, Salym Petroleum Development is working on enhanced oil recovery technology.

== See also ==
- Petroleum industry in Russia
