= Harbottle & Lewis =

Law firm based in London, England

Harbottle & Lewis LLP
- Headquarters: London, England
- No. of offices: One
- No. of lawyers: 128
- Major practice areas: Media and entertainment law
- Revenue: ▲£35.2m
- Date founded: 1955
- Company type: Limited liability partnership
- Website: harbottle.com

Harbottle & Lewis is a law firm based in London, England which advises clients across the media, communications and entertainment industries.

Harbottle & Lewis has 42 partners and 68 lawyers, and in 2016/17 recorded turnover of £28.1 million. It has been listed in the independent legal directories The Legal 500 and Chambers and Partners.

== History ==
Laurence Harbottle and Brian Lewis met at Law School in Guildford in 1951. Both lawyers had a special interest in the legal aspects of film production and theatre and in December 1955 established Harbottle & Lewis with its office in South Molton Street, Mayfair. While Lewis concentrated on film guarantees and film productions, Laurnce Harbottle mainly acted for film producers as well as writers, actors and technicians.

With advances in technology, their firm grew and developed its television and music industry expertise. More recently Harbottle & Lewis has also built specialist practice areas in electronic commerce and interactive entertainment.

The firm moved from South Molton Street to its current location on Hanover Square in May 1988.

Harbottle worked as a solicitor to friends Laurence Olivier and Dirk Bogarde. The firm's clients include King Charles III.

== Relations with News International ==
In 2006 Harbottle & Lewis acted on behalf of Prince Charles in engaging with the Metropolitan Police's investigations with regards to the hacking of the phones of his sons, Princes William and Harry, in the News of the World royal phone hacking scandal. That scandal subsequently led to the dismissal of News of the World reporter Clive Goodman. When Goodman sued for unfair dismissal, Harbottle & Lewis were hired by the News of the World's parent company, News International.

On 10 July 2011, Harbottle & Lewis acting for their client News International were cited by BBC News Business editor Robert Peston as being involved in the 'smoking gun' emails in the News of the World phone hacking scandal. On 18 July 2011, the firm issued an open letter outlining its position, and appointed Luther Pendragon to handle PR issues relating to the affair. On 19 July, Lord MacDonald the former Director of Public Prosecutions engaged by News Corporation to review the emails handed to Harbottle & Lewis in 2007, said in evidence to the Home Affairs Select Committee:

I have to tell you that the material I saw was so blindingly obvious that anyone trying to argue that it shouldn't be given to the police would have had a very tough task

On 20 July, Harbottle & Lewis issued a statement saying that it had asked News International to release it from its professional duty of confidentiality, which had been declined by News International. Harbottle & Lewis subsequently wrote to John Whittingdale MP, chairman of the Culture, Media and Sport Committee, asking to provide evidence to the committee.

On 21 July it was reported that News International had authorised Harbottle & Lewis to answer questions from the Metropolitan Police Service and parliamentary select committees in respect of what they were asked to do.

The Culture, Media and Sports Committee is reported to be planning to write to Harbottle & Lewis asking its representatives to appear when it resumes in October.

Paul Farrelly, one of the MPs on the committee, said:

Harbottle & Lewis stand right up there with all the other people who have come to us and maintained there was only one rogue reporter..... That letter has been allowed to lie on the record for four years when Harbottle & Lewis had other evidence from emails of wrongdoing that have now been finally provided to the police, so Harbottle & Lewis have a lot of questions to answer and we will be pursuing them. We don't know what Harbottle & Lewis were asked to review, we don't know what their brief was.

He said that a letter written by the London law firm in 2007 to News International concerning a review of internal News of the World emails was now "clearly misleading".

On 22 July, Tom Watson, another MP on the committee, published a letter from the Solicitors Regulation Authority in response to his letter expressing concerns about Harbottle and Lewis's part in the phone-hacking affair. In the letter, Anthony Townsend, Chief Executive of the SRA said:

On the basis of our preliminary review of the public domain material, we have decided to instigate a formal investigation. We will pursue our investigation vigorously and thoroughly, but emphasise that our inquiries are at an early stage, and that no conclusions have been reached about whether there may have been any impropriety by any solicitor

== See also ==
- Metropolitan police role in phone hacking scandal
- News International phone hacking scandal
- Phone hacking scandal reference lists
