= Alastair Mullis =

- Born: December 1961 (age 64)
- Education: LLB, LLM
- Alma mater: King's College London; Downing College, Cambridge
- Occupations: Academic, professor
- Organization: University of Leeds (formerly)

Alastair Mullis (born December 1961) is a British legal scholar and professor of law. He served as head of the law school and later as executive dean of the Faculty of Social Sciences at the University of Leeds from 2013 until his retirement in 2023.

== Biography ==
=== Education ===
Mullis graduated with an LLB from King's College London in 1984 and obtained his LLM from Downing College, Cambridge in 1985.

=== Academic career ===
Mullis taught at King's College London from 1989 to 1999, becoming senior lecturer in 1996. He then joined the University of East Anglia in 1999, serving as Dean from 2001 and Professor from 2005. In 2013, he moved to the University of Leeds as Head of the Law School and served as Executive Dean of the Faculty of Social Sciences from 2020 until 2022, continuing as Professor of Law until his retirement in 2023.

He has held visiting professorships in Europe, the Middle East, North America, and Southeast Asia.

== Contributions to law ==
Mullis is a specialist editor for Butterworths Law of Tort and writes (with Donal Nolan) the annual review of tort cases for the All England Law Reports, Annual Review.

== Libel reform advocacy ==
In 2010, Mullis became involved in public debate on libel reform in the UK, co-authoring a research paper with Dr Andrew Scott of the London School of Economics and Political Science. The paper critically responded to recommendations from the Libel Reform Campaign, arguing for evidence-based reforms balancing personal privacy and public interest.

== Bibliography ==
- Torts (3rd edn Macmillan, 2003) (with K Oliphant).
- The CISG: A New Textbook for Students and Practitioners (Sellier 2007) (with P Huber)
