= Russian money in London =

Flow of capital from Russia to the UK

Russian money in London refers to the flow of capital from Russia to the United Kingdom following the dissolution of the Soviet Union, a movement that has had a marked impact on the London economy. Colloquially, this phenomenon is known as "Londongrad" or "Moscow-on-Thames".

== History ==
Russian capital has been a significant presence in London since the dissolution of the Soviet Union in 1991, after which many Russian oligarchs sought to invest their wealth abroad. British government policy encouraged the inflow of foreign capital, notably through the foreign investor visa route introduced under John Major's premiership in 1994; since 2008, approximately one-fifth of the recipients of such visas have been Russian citizens. Additional funds are channelled to British overseas territories that are commonly used as tax havens, such as the Cayman Islands and the British Virgin Islands. The influx of Russian money is widely referred to as "Londongrad" or "Moscow-on-Thames".

Over £27 billion has been invested by Russian citizens in the United Kingdom. Among the assets acquired are Premier League football clubs, Scottish country estates, and the Evening Standard. The Tate galleries were supported by Viktor Vekselberg and Peter Aven. Alexander Mamut invested £100 million in the Waterstones bookshop chain, having acquired it in 2011 for £53 million. According to its managing director, James Daunt, Mamut's intervention rescued the business, which recorded its first annual profit since 2008 in 2016. Daunt later remarked that continued Russian ownership would have been "catastrophic" for the chain in 2022.

According to Transparency International, at least £1.5 billion has been invested in UK property by Russians "accused of financial crime or with links to the Kremlin". In 2018, following the poisoning of Sergei and Yulia Skripal, the Foreign Affairs Committee published a report entitled "Moscow's Gold: Russian Corruption in the UK". In 2020, the Intelligence and Security Committee observed that the influence of Russian business was so deeply embedded in the British financial system that it "cannot be untangled".

Following the 2022 Russian invasion of Ukraine, a political consensus emerged in the United Kingdom in favour of taking action against Russian oligarchs. Unexplained wealth orders were expected to be more rigorously enforced, and the foreign investor visa route was to be abolished. The Economic Crime Bill, which had previously stalled, was revived; it included a register designed to improve the transparency of ultimate land ownership, which at the time was frequently obscured through the use of shell companies. Reuters reported that some Russian citizens had begun restructuring ownership and consulting lawyers in order to shield their assets.

== Offshore property and shell companies ==
A substantial portion of Russian capital in London has been channelled into residential real estate through shell companies and offshore vehicles, rendering the beneficial ownership of assets difficult to trace. Research suggests that tens of thousands of London properties are owned by offshore entities, many of which have unknown or opaque owners. One study, for instance, estimated that over 42,000 London properties, collectively worth in excess of £56 billion, are held by offshore entities and are frequently either under-used or left almost entirely vacant.

In addition, British banks have been shown to have processed hundreds of millions of dollars potentially originating from illicit Russian flows. In 2017, The Guardian reported that British and foreign banks in London had handled approximately $738.1 million in transactions linked to criminal money from Moscow, routed through a network of anonymously owned companies registered in London.

== See also ==
- Russian oligarchs § Russian oligarchs in London
- History of Russia (1991–present)#"Shock therapy"
- Russians in the United Kingdom
- The Shock Doctrine
- Moneyland
