= Gazprom Neft =

Russian fuel company

PAO (PJSC) Gazprom Neft
- Native name: ПАО «Газпром нефть»
- Type: State-owned company Subsidiary; Public (OAO)
- Traded as: MCX: SIBN
- Industry: Oil and gas
- Predecessor: Sibneft
- Founded: 1995; 31 years ago
- Headquarters: St. Petersburg, Russia
- Key people: Alexei Miller (Chairman); Alexander Dyukov (CEO); Kirill Morozov (deputy CEO)
- Products: Petroleum
- Revenue: $42.3 billion (2025)
- Operating income: $5.04 billion (2025)
- Net income: $2.88 billion (2025)
- Total assets: $50.2 billion (2017; 2018; 2019; 2020; 2021; 2024; 2025)
- Total equity: $37 billion (2025)
- Owner: Gazprom (95.68%)
- Number of employees: 55,900 (2012)
- Subsidiaries: Gazpromneft-Khantos; Gazpromneft-Noyabrskneftegaz; Gazpromneft-Yamal; Gazpromneft-Vostok; Gazpromneft NTC; Gazprom Neft Shelf; Evrotek-Yugra; Tsentr Naukoemkikh Tekhnologiy; Salym Petroleum Development; Naftna Industrija Srbije (NIS)
- Website: www.gazprom-neft.com

Gazprom Neft (Russian: Газпром Нефть; formerly Sibneft, Russian: Сибнефть) is the third largest oil producer in Russia and ranked third according to refining throughput. It is a subsidiary of Gazprom, which owns about 96% of its shares. The company is registered and headquartered in St. Petersburg after central offices were relocated from Moscow in 2011.

By the end of 2012 Gazprom Neft accounted for 10% of oil and gas production and 14.6% of refining activities in Russia. Production volumes in 2012 increased by 4.3% in comparison with 2011, refining throughput grew by 7%, revenue was up 19.5% with EBITDA and net profit advancing by 7.7% and 9.9% accordingly.

== History ==
Gazprom Neft was created under the name Sibneft (Russian: Сибнефть) in 1995 by the transfer of state owned shares in Noyabrskneftegas (production unit), the Omsk Refinery (Russia's largest oil refining complex), Noyabrskneftegasgeophysica (exploration) and Omsknefteprodukt (oil products distribution network) from Rosneft.

In 1996 and 1997, Sibneft was privatised through a series of loans-for-shares auctions. Roman Abramovich and Boris Berezovsky acquired the company for US$100 million, after bidding through several front companies that had been set up for this specific purpose. Each partner paid US$100 million for half of the company, above the stake's stock market value of US$150 million at the time, and the company value rapidly increased to billions. The fast-rising value of the company led many observers, in hindsight, to suggest that the real cost of the company should have been in the billions of dollars (it was worth US$2.7 billion at that time). Abramovich later admitted in court that he paid billions of dollars of bribes to government officials and gangsters to acquire and protect his assets.

Initially controlled by Berezovsky, Sibneft later came under the control of Abramovich.

Sibneft twice unsuccessfully attempted a merger with Yukos that would have created Russia's largest oil company, Yuksi or YukosSibneft. The first attempt in 1998 failed due to a management dispute and the impact of the 1998 Russian financial crisis, while the second attempt ended when Sibneft's shareholders called off the deal in November 2003 after the federal government cracked down on Yukos despite the process already being well under way.

In September 2005, Gazprom bought 75.7% of Sibneft's shares from Millhouse Capital (Roman Abramovich's investment vehicle) for US$13.1 billion in Russia's largest corporate takeover. In May 2006, Sibneft was renamed Gazprom Neft.

In 2006, Alexander Dyukov was elected as CEO of the company, and in 2008, he was also appointed chairman of the management board. His contract was extended for a further five years in December 2011.

In 2011, Berezovsky brought a civil case against Abramovich in the High Court of Justice in London, accusing Abramovich of blackmail and breach of contract over the privatisation of Sibneft, claiming that he had been a co-owner of Sibneft and seeking over £3 billion in damages. This became the largest civil court case in British legal history. The court dismissed the lawsuit, concluding "that the sum of $1.3 billion paid by Mr. Abramovich to Mr. Berezovsky and Mr. Patarkatsishvili did not represent the sale price of Mr. Berezovsky’s and Mr. Patarkatsishvili’s alleged Sibneft interest, but rather was a final lump sum payment in order to discharge what Mr. Abramovich regarded as his krysha obligations."

In 2017, Gazprom Neft became one of Russia's top three oil producers (62.3 million tonnes of oil).

== Private army ==
In February 2023, Russian Prime Minister Mikhail Mishustin signed an order, giving Gazprom Neft the right to form its own private army.

== Owners and management ==
The principal owner of Gazprom Neft is OAO Gazprom, which controls 95.68% of the company's shares, while the remaining 4.32% are publicly traded. 20% of Gazprom Neft's shares were originally owned by the Italian oil and gas company Eni before being purchased by Gazprom for $4.1 billion in April 2009. Alexander Dyukov is CEO and chairman of the management board. Alexey Miller is chairman of the board.

== Operations ==
=== Reserves and production ===
As of 31 December 2012, Gazprom Neft and its subsidiaries hold the mineral rights to 74 license areas located in 11 regions of Russia. In Serbia, the Gazprom Neft's subsidiary Naftna Industrija Srbije, holds 69 licenses. Based on an audit of reserves conducted by DeGolyer and MacNaughton and according to the Petroleum Resources Management System standards, the company's proven reserves at the end of 2012 totaled 1.2 billion tonnes of oil equivalent, and its reserve replacement ratio was over 286%.

Most of the company's oil production operations in Russia are carried out by three subsidiaries: Gazpromneft-Noyabrskneftegaz, Gazpromneft-Khantos and Gazpromneft-Vostok. These companies are developing fields in the Yamalo-Nenets and Khanty-Mansi autonomous areas and the Omsk, Tomsk, Tyumen and Irkutsk regions. Gazprom Neft also holds 50% stakes in three dependent companies: Slavneft, Tomskneft and Salym Petroleum Development. Together with Novatek, it owns Arktikgaz.

=== Refining ===
In 2012, Gazprom Neft refined 43.3 million tonnes of oil. The company wholly or partly owns 5 oil refineries (the Omsk Refinery, Moscow Refinery, and Yaroslavl Refinery in Russia, along with two oil refineries in Pančevo and Novi Sad in Serbia that belong to Naftna Industrija Srbije). In January 2026, it was announced that Gazprom Neft had signed a heads of agreement to sell its 56.15 per cent stake in Naftna Industrija Srbije to MOL Group for an undisclosed sum. The proposed transaction was subject to regulatory approvals and the execution of a final sale and purchase agreement.

=== Sales ===
The company operates around 1,100 filling stations in Russia under the 'Gazpromneft' trademark (unlike the name of the company, the filling station brand is written as one word). In total, the company's retail network consists of more than 1,600 filling stations, including in Tajikistan, Kazakhstan, Kyrgyzstan, Belarus, Ukraine and Serbia (mostly under the NIS brand). According to research by Romir Holding, the Gazpromneft brand is one of the top 3 filling station brands in Russia. In April 2011, it won the "Brand of the Year/Effie" award. In 2013 the company's own fuel brands, G-Drive and G-Energy, also received this award. Nielsen, a global information and measurement company, named both Gazpromneft and G-Drive among the top three most popular brands in their categories.

The company also owns a number of distribution companies in the bunkering (Gazpromneft Marine Bunker) and aviation fuel (Gazpromneft-Aero) businesses, as well as a fuel and lubricant production business (Gazpromneft-Lubricants). Production of motor oils under the G-Energy premium brand began in 2010. British actor Jason Statham became the face of G-Energy's advertising campaign in 2011. In addition to G-Energy, the company's oils and lubricants are also sold under the Gazpromneft (industrial oils and lubricants), SibiMotor (light vehicles and commercial transport) and Texaco (marine oils, produced under Chevron's license) brands with over 300 trade names.

=== Performance indicators ===
The company's production volume in 2012 increased by 4.3% to 59.8 tonnes of oil equivalent.

In 2012, Gazprom Neft switched from US GAAP reporting in dollars to International Financial Reporting Standards (IFRS) reporting in rubles.

Company's financial indicators (US GAAP Standards)
	2008	2009	2010	2011	2012	2021
Sales revenue (mln)	▲$33,870	▼$24,305	▲$32,912	▲$44,172	▲RUB 1,230,266	▼$41,700
EBITDA (mln)	▲$8,610	▼$6,037	▲$7,271	▲$10,158	▲RUB 323,106	▼$7,620
Net profit (mln)	▲$4,658	▼$3,026	▲$3,151	▲$5,352	▲RUB 176,296	▲$7,050

=== Oil fields development ===
==== Novoportovskoye field ====
The recoverable C1+ C2 reserves of the Novoportovskoye oil and gas condensate field total over 230 million tonnes of oil and over 270 billion cubic metres (9.5 trillion cubic feet) of gas. The field is located in the Yamal District of the Yamalo-Nenets Autonomous Area, 30 km from the Gulf of Ob. The license for the Novoportovskoye field belongs to Gazprom Neft Novy Port with Gazprom Neft as the operator of the project. In spring 2011, Gazprom Neft confirmed the viability of year-round supply from the field by sea.

The Novoportovskoye field will be developed in two phases, first focussing on the southern part of the field where peak production will reach 5 mln tonnes of oil per year. The second phase will look at the northern part of the field, where peak production is expected to reach 3 mln tonnes of oil per year.

==== Messoyakha fields ====
The Messoyakha Group of oil and gas fields consists of the West-Messoyakha and East-Messoyakha sites. Messoyakhaneftegas, an equally owned joint venture with TNK-BP, holds the licenses for both blocks with Gazprom Neft as operator. The recoverable C1+C2 reserves of both blocks total 620 million tonnes of primarily heavy oil.

The fields were discovered in the 1980s and are the most northern-located onshore Russian fields. The Messoyakha oil and gas fields are located on the Gyda Peninsula in the Tazovsky District of the Yamalo-Nenets Autonomous Area - an Arctic climate zone with undeveloped infrastructure.

By 2020, the Messoyakha fields are expected to be producing eight million tonnes per year, with the first million produced by 2016.

=== International projects ===
- Serbia. Naftna Industrija Srbije. NIS is the largest international asset of Gazprom Neft which owns 56.15% of share capital. NIS's main hydrocarbon production centres are located in Serbia, Angola, Bosnia and Herzegovina, Hungary and Romania with total volume of 1.233 mln tonnes of hydrocorbones produced in 2012. The company operates two refineries in the towns of Pancevo and Novi Sad with a total refining capacity of 7.3 mln tonnes per year and has a network of over 480 petrol stations and oil storage facilities.
- Angola. The company gained a presence in Angola in 2009 after acquiring NIS.
- Venezuela. Development of the Junin-6 field together with PDVSA. Reserves: 10.96 billion barrels.
- Iraq. Gazprom Neft previously participated in oil projects in Iraq, including the Badra field in Wasit Province and the Garmian block in the Kurdistan Region of Iraq; however, these assets are no longer part of PJSC Gazprom Neft’s corporate perimeter.

Development of the Badra field. The Badra oil field is situated in Wasit Province in Eastern Iraq. The geologic reserves at Badra field have been determined to amount to 3 billion barrels of oil.

The service contract for development of the oil field was signed in the beginning of 2010. The winning bid was submitted by a consortium of companies which originally included Gazprom Neft as the Russian participant and project operator. Following a subsequent restructuring of the project’s corporate structure, the Russian participant and current project operator is IC LLC Badra Petroleum, which is wholly owned by West Asia LLC, a company within PJSC Gazprom’s corporate structure.

As of 2026 consortium consists of:

- IC LLC Badra Petroleum (Russian Federation, the Project operator);
- KOGAS (Korea);
- PETRONAS (Malaysia);
- TPAO (Turkey);
- The Iraqi Government, represented by the Iraqi Oil Exploration Company (OEC).

The Badra oil field development project is scheduled to last 20 years with a possible five-year extension. Production was originally expected to reach 170,000 barrels of oil per day, which is around 8.5 million tons a year by 2017, and to remain at this level for seven years.

Over a short period, new infrastructure for the field's commercial development has been installed at the oil field. It allowed for the commercial production of oil to begin in May 2014.

The first line of the central processing facility (CPF) was put into operation with a capacity of 60 thousand barrels per day. Oil gathering and preparation are carried out at this industrial facility. The Badra field was connected to the main Iraqi oil pipeline system by a 165-kilometer-long pipeline.

In the Iraqi's point of view, the Badra oil field in one of the most difficult in the region, primarily due to geological circumstances. The geological structure of the deposit can be compared with a "layer cake": argillaceous deposits are interleaved by limestone, which makes drilling difficult. Therefore, specialists are facing a more labor-intensive task. At the moment all these difficulties have been successfully overcome. Over the course of the field’s development, 22 wells were drilled at Badra, with an average depth of around 4,500 meters. Additional sidetrack drilling has also been planned to increase oil recovery.

New innovative technologies are applied at Badra. Among them are:

- smart wells system (smart completion), which allows controlling of each individual layer of the drilling well, and adjusting the equipment remotely;
- CPF SCADA system (central processing facility supervisory control and data acquisition);
- PLDS (pipe leak detection system);

Solar panels can be another example of the usage of modern technologies. They allow the block valve station to work independently from electricity.

The Badra oil field development consortium annually invests in education, medicine and other social projects in Iraq. In 2013 Gazprom Neft Badra B.V., which was the project operator at the time, donated some buses to the University in Kut, allowing students from the surrounding villages to regularly attend classes. In Badra City additional buildings for three secondary schools have been built in 2014. Moreover, Gazprom Neft Badra B.V. provided modern computer equipment to the schools of the city, financed the renovation of the town medical clinic in Badra and supplied an emergency medical care unit with modern medical equipment. Also, the renovation and construction of power grids in Badra was financed in 2013.

For the town of Badra the oil field is, in fact, a local economic mainstay, as almost 30% of its residents work at the production field. The company is conducting a program of the retraining of Iraqi professionals to work in the field. Selection is made on a competitive basis. Prospective employees undergo a special 2-year profession and language training program. Today, more than 1000 Iraqis have already been employed at the field.

Gazprom Neft acquired participating interests in the Garmian (40%) and Shakal (80%) blocks in Kurdistan region in 2012 through a Dutch-based subsidiary Gazprom Neft Middle East B.V. (re-named into Garmian Petroleum B.V. on 6 June 2026). In 2013, Gazprom Neft Middle East entered the Halabja project (80% share). The company later withdrew from the Shakal and Halabja projects after exploration did not confirm availability of commercially viable hydrocarbon reserves. Garmian Petroleum B.V., following a corporate restructuring completed in 2025, is no longer part of PJSC Gazprom Neft’s corporate perimeter. As of 2026, Garmian Petroleum B.V. is owned by West Asia LLC, a company within PJSC Gazprom’s corporate structure.

- Italy. Gazprom Neft acquired an oil and lubricant plant in the city of Bari in 2009.
- Cuba. A 30% stake in a project for the development of four shelf blocks with reserves of 450 million tonnes. First appraisal well was drilled in 2011.

== Sponsorship ==
Sibneft was the official sponsor of the CSKA Moscow football team. However, Gazprom Neft cancelled this deal in 2005 after Gazprom bought a majority stake in fellow Russian Premier Division football side, Zenit Saint Petersburg.

Gazprom Neft also sponsors the Avangard Omsk and SKA ice hockey clubs, and a variety of running, five-a-side football, Nordic skiing and motocross events. In 2010, Gazprom Neft and Gazprombank sponsored Russian racing driver Mikhail Aleshin during his championship-winning year.

== Sanctions ==
In March 2022, as a result of the 2022 Russian invasion of Ukraine, the EU imposed sanctions on Gazprom Neft.

== See also ==
- Gazprom City
- Lukoil
- Lakhta Center
- Naftna Industrija Srbije
- Rosneft
- Transneft
- Yuganskneftegaz
- List of oil exploration and production companies
