= Kleptocracy =

Government where officials steal for personal gain

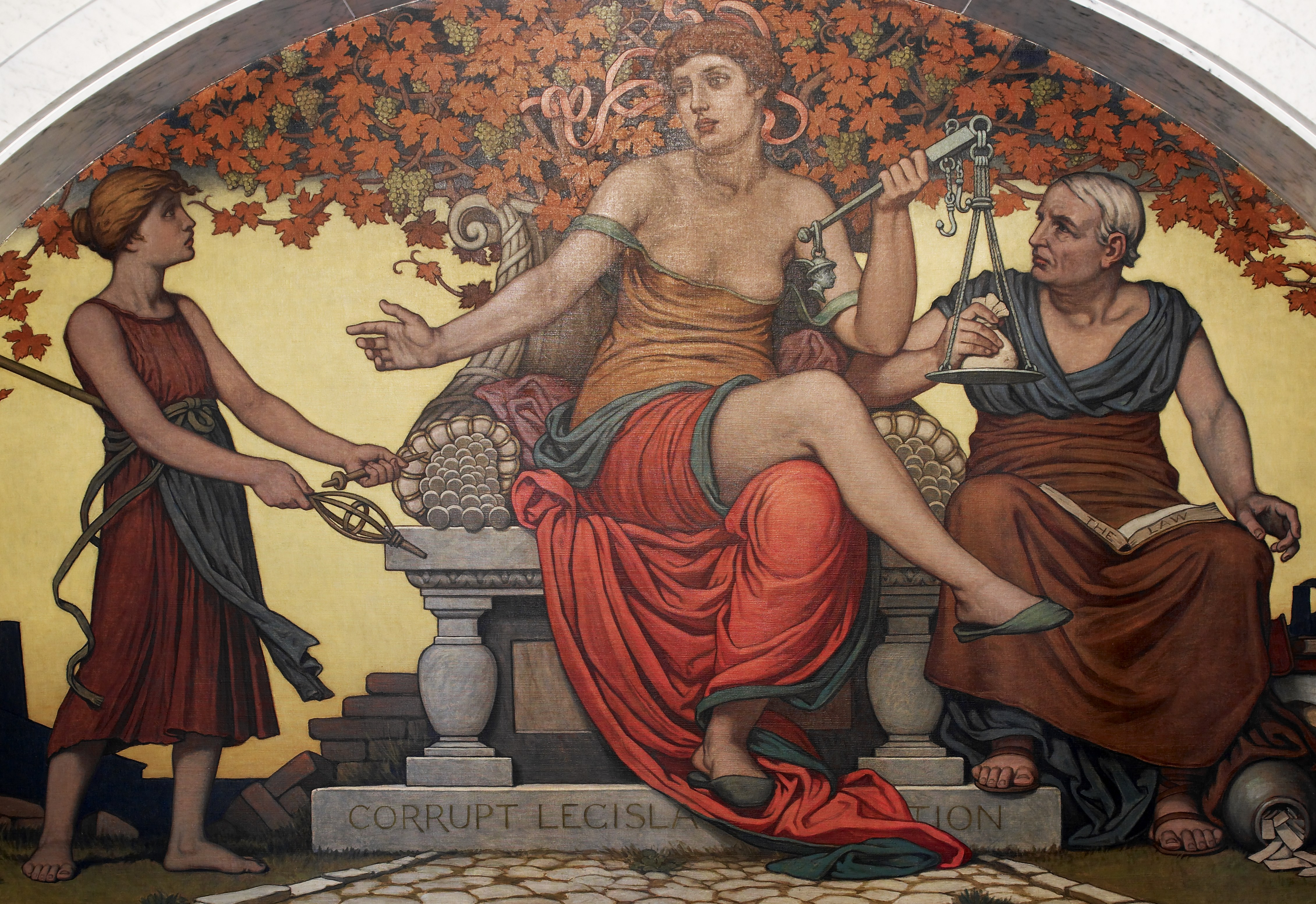
Detail from Corrupt Legislation, painting by Elihu Vedder (1896)

Kleptocracy is a form of government in which those in power use their position to steal or exploit national resources for personal gain.

The word is attested in English from at least 1819, while its modern sense dates from the 1870s.

== Etymology ==
The term is formed from the Greek klepto- ("theft") and the suffix -cracy ("form of government", from French -cratie, ultimately from Greek -kratia). The Oxford English Dictionary defines kleptocracy as "A ruling body or order of thieves. Also, government by thieves; a nation ruled by this kind of government." It cites the earliest usage from an 1819 essay by Leigh Hunt on picaresque fiction. The term was later adopted in its familiar sense by civil service reform advocates in the United States.

== Characteristics ==
Kleptocratic rulers often treat their country's treasury as a source of personal wealth, spending funds on luxury goods and extravagances as they see fit. Many kleptocratic rulers secretly transfer public funds into hidden personal accounts in foreign countries to provide for themselves if removed from power.

According to L. K. Samuels, one reason governmental bodies subscribe to theft-prone policies is to lay the groundwork for the socialization of labor and property, thus permitting kleptocrats to make a populace "subservient to an institutionalized authority". Journalist Paul Greenberg, in writing in 1989 against the idea of the United States sending substantial foreign aid to Poland, argued that the country was emerging from "40 years of a Communist thievocracy that has obliterated not only economic progress but also the idea of a modern economy".

== Financial system ==
Contemporary studies have identified 21st-century kleptocracy as a global financial system based on money laundering, which "depends on the services of the world's largest banks and expert financial professionals". The International Monetary Fund has suggested it could be a consensus of estimates, that money laundering made up 2–5 percent of the global economy in 1998. Kleptocrats engage in money laundering to obscure the corrupt origins of their wealth and safeguard it from domestic threats such as economic instability and predatory kleptocratic rivals. They are then able to secure this wealth in assets and investments within more stable jurisdictions, where it can then be stored for personal use, returned to the country of origin to support the kleptocrat's domestic activities, or deployed elsewhere to protect and project the regime's interests overseas.

Kleptocrats abuse the freedoms found in Western countries by transferring funds out of a kleptocracy and into Western jurisdictions for money laundering and asset security. Since 2011, more than $1 trillion has left developing countries annually in illicit financial outflows. A 2016 study found that $12 trillion had been siphoned out of developing economies. Western professional services providers are often taken advantage of by exploiting legal and financial loopholes in the West to facilitate transnational money laundering. The kleptocratic financial system typically comprises four steps according to one opinion.

1. First, kleptocrats or those operating on their behalf create anonymous shell companies to conceal the origins and ownership of the funds. Multiple interlocking networks of anonymous shell companies may be created and nominee directors appointed to further conceal the kleptocrat as the ultimate beneficial owner of the funds.
2. Second, kleptocrats violate Western laws when they illegally transfer funds into the Western financial system.
3. Third, financial transactions conducted by the kleptocrat in a Western country complete the integration of the funds. Once a kleptocrat has purchased an asset this can then be resold, providing a defensible albeit illegal origin of the funds. This is known as money laundering and is illegal throughout the Western world. Research has shown that the purchase of luxury real estate is a particularly favored method, especially by Russian kleptocrats.
4. Fourth, according to a British newspaper, kleptocrats may use their illegally laundered funds to engage in reputation laundering, hiring public relations firms to present a positive public image and lawyers to suppress journalistic scrutiny of their political connections and the origins of their wealth.

In a 2011 forensic study of grand corruption cases, the World Bank found the United States was the leading victim of illegal incorporation of entities involved in money laundering schemes. The Department of the Treasury estimates that $300 billion is laundered annually in the United States in violation of US law.

This kleptocratic financial system flourishes in the United States by illegally abusing the United States' liberal economic structure for two reasons.

1. First, the United States does not have a beneficial ownership registry, and kleptocrats take advantage of this privacy benefit.
2. Second, kleptocrats take advantage of incorporation agents, lawyers, and realtors to unknowingly launder their money.

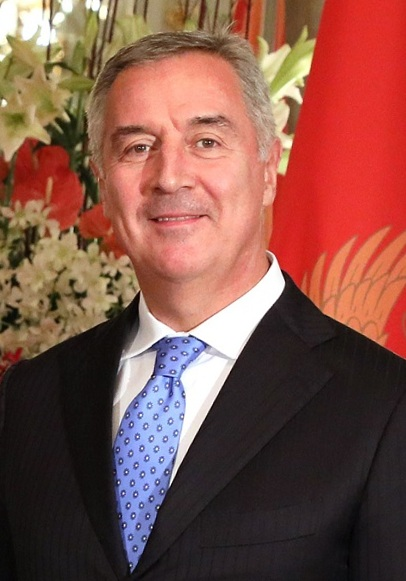
Montenegro's president Milo Đukanović was listed among the twenty richest world leaders according to The Independent in May 2010, which described the source of his wealth as "mysterious".

As of 2016, there are only around 1,200 money laundering convictions per year in the United States and money launderers face a less than five percent chance of conviction. Raymond W. Baker estimates that law enforcement fails in 99.9% of cases to detect money laundering by kleptocrats and other financial criminals.

Other Western jurisdictions favoured by kleptocrats include South Africa, the United Kingdom, and British dependencies, especially the British Virgin Islands, the Cayman Islands, Guernsey, and Jersey. Jurisdictions connected to the European Union that are particularly favoured by kleptocrats include Cyprus, the Netherlands, and the Netherlands Antilles.

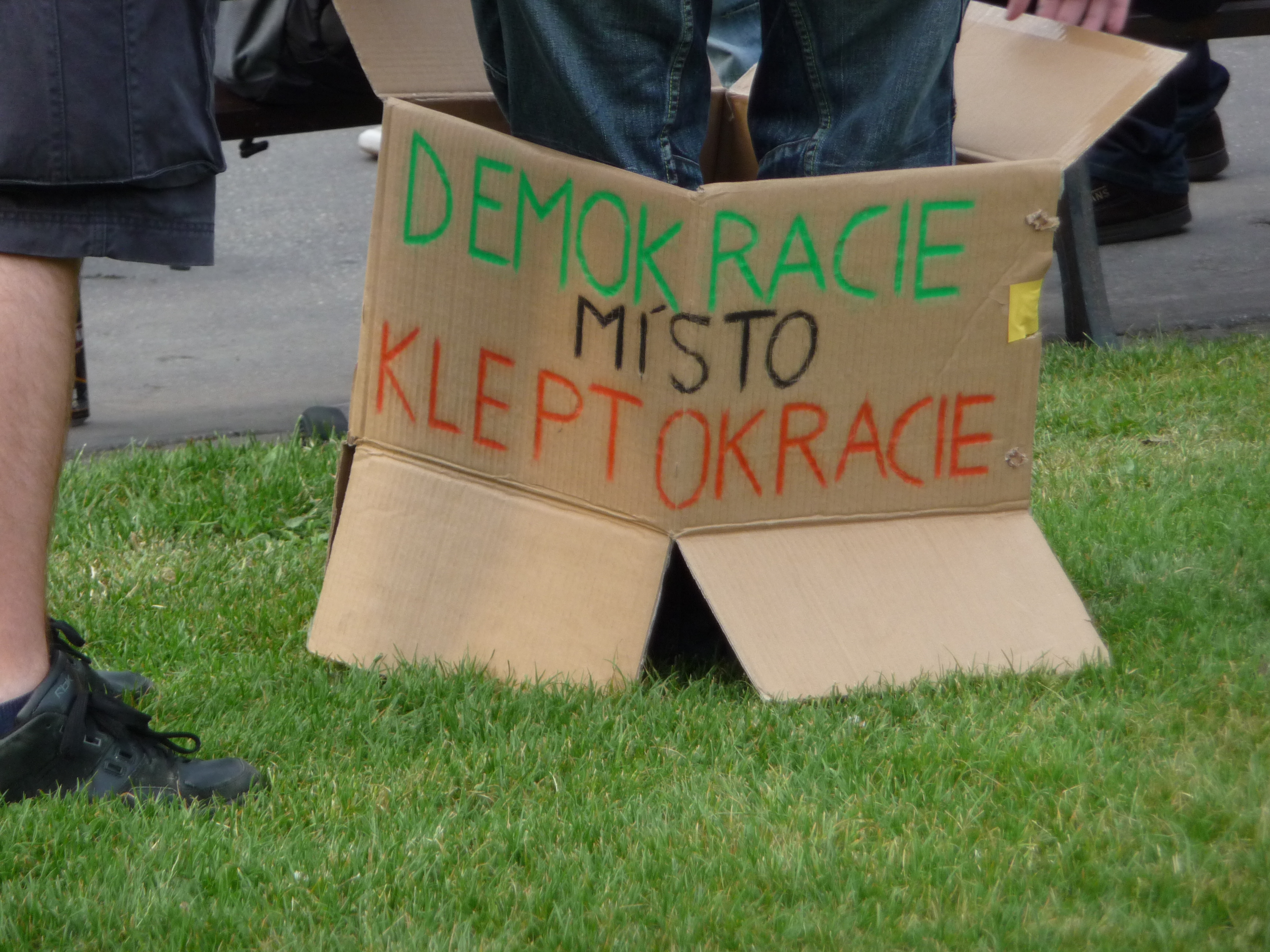
Demonstration banner with text in Czech: Demokracie místo kleptokracie ("Democracy instead of kleptocracy"); peace rally in Brno for Real Democracy NOW, Moravian Square, Brno, Czech Republic

== Political and corporate kleptomania ==
Other forms of a thievery society that can induce a "culture of systematic fraud" have been described as "political and corporate kleptomania". In this case, the plunder and looting enriches not only high government officials, but a narrow class of plutocrats, who usually represent wealthy individuals and families who have amassed great assets through the usage of political favoritism, special interest legislation, monopolies, special tax breaks, state intervention, subsidies or outright graft. This type of economic system of political spoils is sometimes referred to as crony capitalism.

== Effects ==
The effects of a kleptocratic regime or government on a nation are typically adverse in regards to the welfare of the state's economy, political affairs, and civil rights. Kleptocratic governance typically ruins prospects of foreign investment and drastically weakens the domestic market and cross-border trade. As kleptocracies often embezzle money from their citizens by misusing funds derived from tax payments, or engage heavily in money laundering schemes, they tend to heavily degrade the quality of life for citizens.

In addition, the money that kleptocrats steal is diverted from funds earmarked for public amenities such as the building of hospitals, schools, roads, parks – having further adverse effects on the quality of life of citizens. The informal oligarchy that results from a kleptocratic elite subverts democracy (or any other political format).

== Examples ==
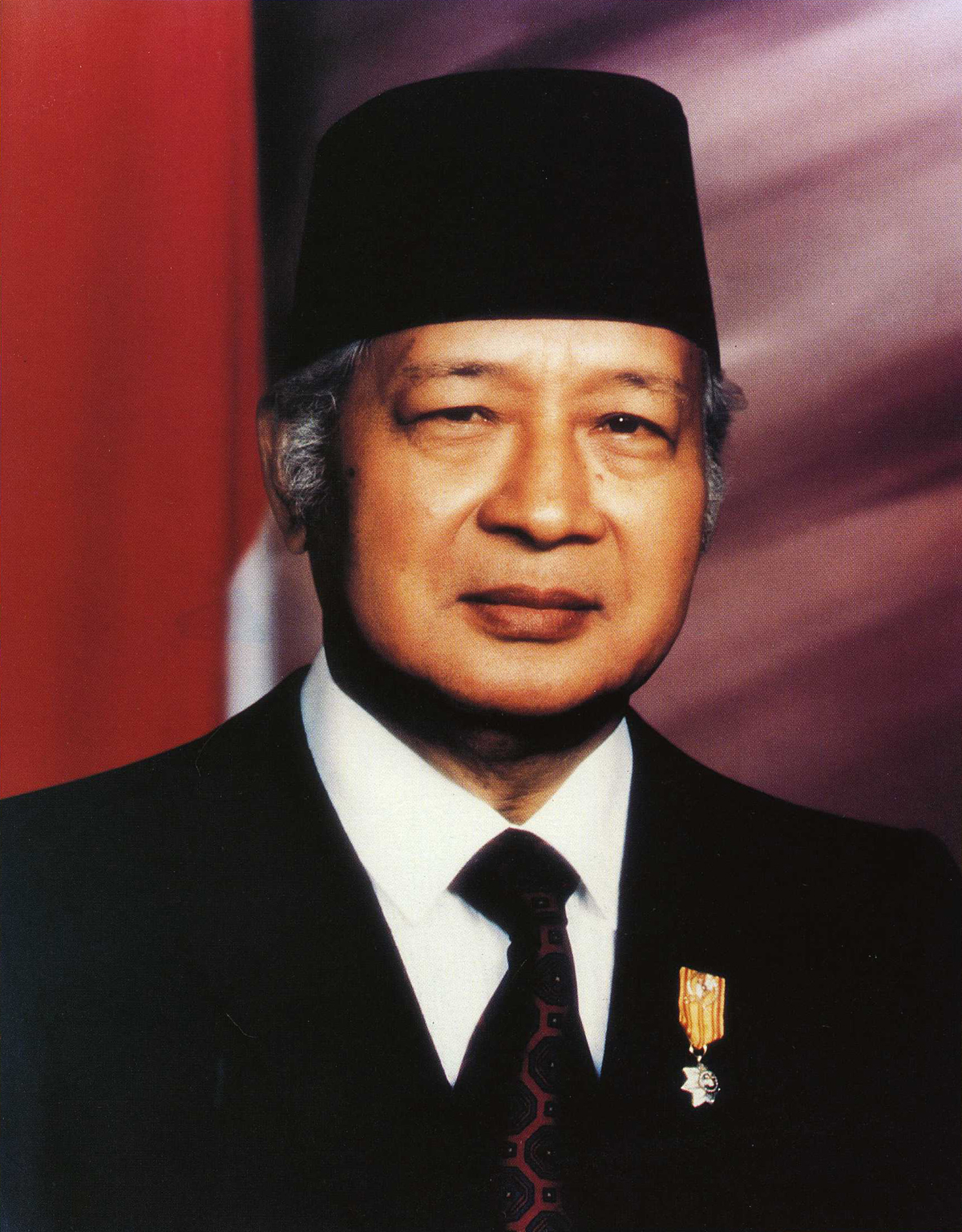
Suharto, the former President of Indonesia, was reported to have stolen over $15 billion during his presidency.

In early 2004, the German anti-corruption NGO Transparency International released a list of ten self-enriching leaders in the two decades previous to the report. Transparency International acknowledged that they were "not necessarily the 10 most corrupt leaders" and noted that "very little is known about the amounts actually embezzled".

In descending order of amount allegedly stolen (converted to United States dollars), they were:

1. Former Indonesian President Suharto ($15 billion to $35 billion)
2. Former Philippine President Ferdinand Marcos ($5 billion to $10 billion)
3. Former Zairian President Mobutu Sese Seko ($5 billion)
4. Former Nigerian Head of State Sani Abacha ($2 billion to $5 billion)
5. Former Yugoslav President Slobodan Milošević ($1 billion)
6. Former Haitian President Jean-Claude Duvalier ($300 million to $800 million)
7. Former Peruvian President Alberto Fujimori ($600 million)
8. Former Ukrainian Prime Minister Pavlo Lazarenko ($114 million to $200 million)
9. Former Nicaraguan President Arnoldo Alemán ($100 million)
10. Former Philippine President Joseph Estrada ($78 million to $80 million)

The political system in Russia has been described as a Mafia state where president Vladimir Putin serves as the "head of the clan".

Former Malaysian Prime Minister Najib Razak had $731 million in his personal bank accounts when his ruling party alliance Barisan Nasional lost the 14th election to opposition party Pakatan Harapan led by former Prime Minister Mahathir Mohamad, in part because of allegations of participating in the 1MDB scandal.

Azerbaijan has been described as a kleptocracy for its use of oil revenue to enrich an oligarch class, including that of the ruling Aliyev dynasty. Azerbaijan's leader Ilham Aliyev and his wife Mehriban Aliyeva were described as the "embodiment of nepotism and kleptocracy" in Azerbaijan.

In 2010, The Washington Times estimated that HDZ elites in Croatia led by former prime minister Ivo Sanader had "stolen or siphoned off" about 1 billion USD.

The 2015–2016 protests in Moldova were organised by a grass-roots citizens' movement, Dignity and Truth, as a response to the disappearance of $1 billion from the Moldovan banks in 2014. Former Prime Minister Vlad Filat was arrested on October 15, 2015, for involvement in the bank fraud scandal.

In 2016 the Enough Project issued a report claiming that the Democratic Republic of the Congo is run as a violent kleptocracy.

== Narcokleptocracy ==
A narcokleptocracy is a society in which criminals involved in the trade of narcotics have undue influence on the governance of a state. For instance, the term was used to describe the regime of Manuel Noriega in Panama in a report prepared by a subcommittee of the United States Senate Committee on Foreign Relations chaired by Massachusetts Senator John Kerry.

In 2020, the United States charged the president of Venezuela, Nicolas Maduro with drug trafficking, as well as many officials and head figures of his administration.

== See also ==
- State capture – Corruption where private interests influence a state's decision-making processes
- Elite capture – Form of political corruption
- Failed state – State that has lost its ability to govern
- Banana republic – Term for a politically unstable country
- Group of States Against Corruption
- International Anti-Corruption Academy
- International Anti-Corruption Day
- Kakistocracy – Government run by the least qualified
- Kleptocracy Tour – Tour of urban properties used for money-laundering by corrupt governments
- Kleptopia – Book by Tom Burgis published 2020
- Panama Papers – 2016 document leak scandal
- Paradise Papers
- Political corruption – Use of power by government officials for illegitimate private gain
- United Nations Convention against Corruption
