= Lord's =

Cricket venue in St John's Wood, UK

Lord's Cricket Ground
- The Home of Cricket

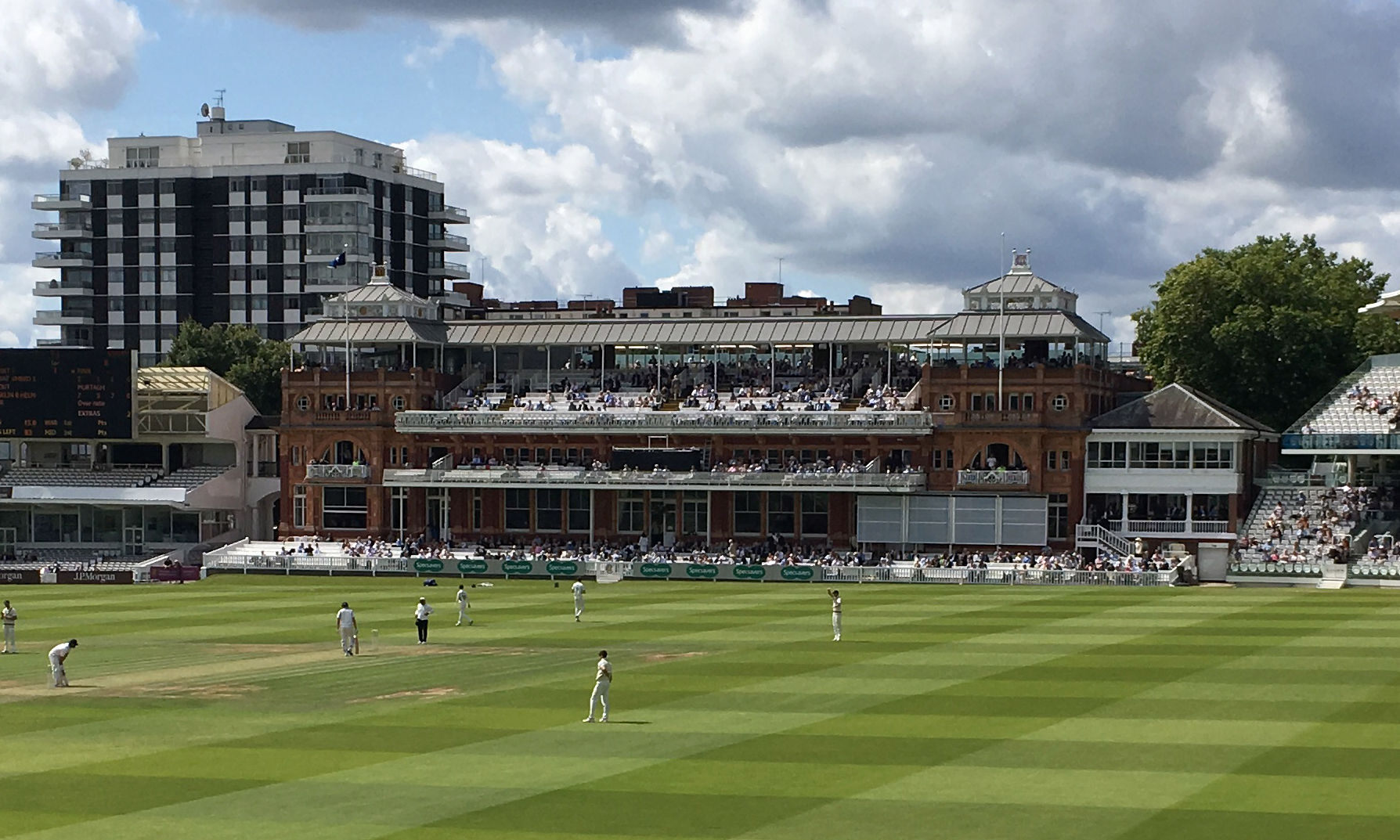
- Lord's Pavilion
- Interactive map of Lord's Cricket Ground

Ground information
- Location: St John's Wood, City of Westminster, England
- Country: United Kingdom
- Coordinates: 51.5294°N 0.1727°W
- Establishment: 1787; 239 years ago at Lord's Old Ground; 1811; at Lord's Middle Ground; 1814; 212 years ago at the present Lord's Cricket Ground
- Capacity: 31,100
- Owner: Marylebone Cricket Club
- Tenants: England and Wales Cricket Board
- Website: lords.org
- End names
- Nursery End Pavilion End

International information
- First men's Test: 21–23 July 1884: England v Australia
- Last men's Test: 27–31 August 2026: England v Pakistan
- First men's ODI: 26 August 1972: England v Australia
- Last men's ODI: 19 July 2026: England v India
- First men's T20I: 5 June 2009: England v Netherlands
- Last men's T20I: 29 July 2018: Nepal v Netherlands
- First women's Test: 10 July 2026: England v India
- First women's ODI: 4 August 1976: England v Australia
- Last women's ODI: 19 July 2025: England v India
- First women's T20I: 21 June 2009: England v New Zealand
- Last women's T20I: 5 July 2026: England v Australia

Team information
Marylebone Cricket Club	(1814 – present)
Middlesex	(1877 – present)
- As of 27 August 2026; Source: Cricinfo

Lord's Cricket Ground, better known as Lord's, is a cricket venue at St John's Wood, historically in Middlesex and now in the City of Westminster, England. Named after its founder, Thomas Lord, it is owned by Marylebone Cricket Club (MCC) and serves as the home of Middlesex County Cricket Club, the England and Wales Cricket Board (ECB), ICC Europe and, until August 2005, the International Cricket Council (ICC). Lord's houses the world's oldest sporting museum.

Lord's today is not on its original 18th-century site; it is the third of three grounds which Thomas Lord established between 1787 and 1814. His first ground, now referred to as Lord's Old Ground, was where Dorset Square now stands. Lord's Middle Ground was in use from 1811 to 1813, before being abandoned for the construction of Regent's Canal which carved its way through the outfield. Lord's present ground is about 250 yards (230 m) north-west of the previous Middle Ground site. The ground can hold 31,100 spectators, its capacity increasing between 2017 and 2022 as part of MCC's ongoing redevelopment plans.

== History ==
=== Background ===
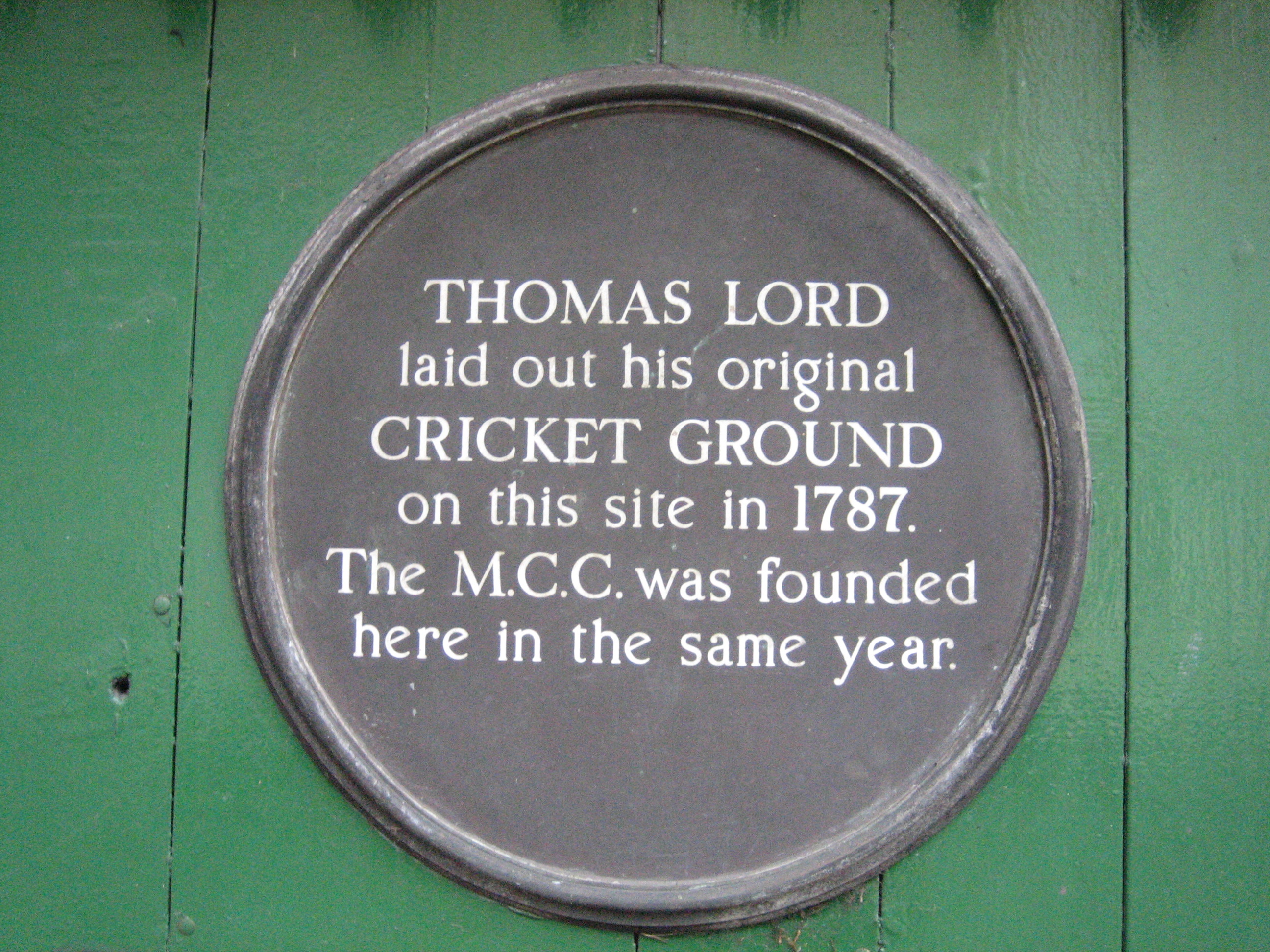
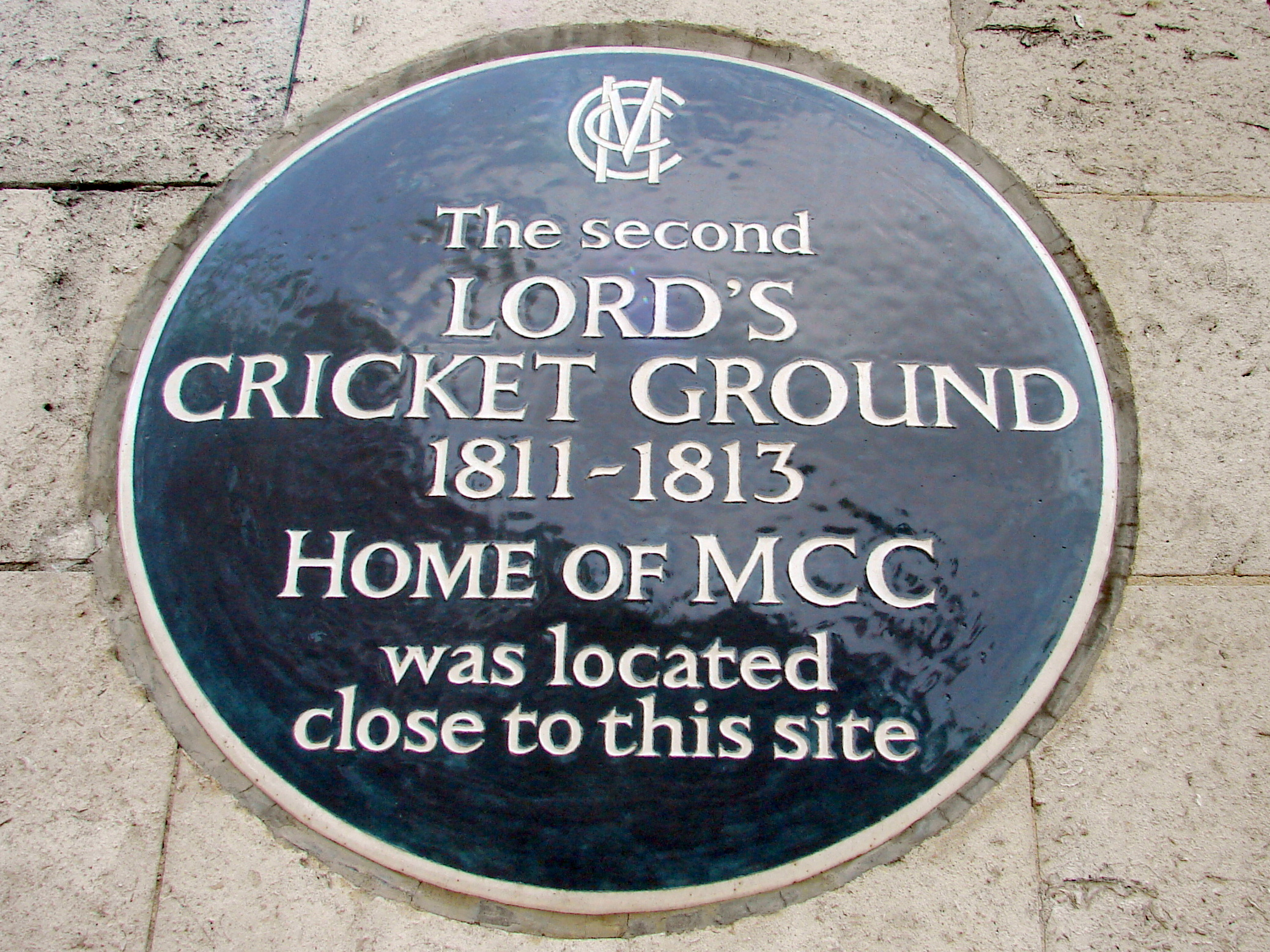
Plaques commemorating the locations of Lord's Old Ground (left) and Middle Ground (right)

Thomas Lord, acting on behalf of the Islington-based White Conduit Club, opened his first ground in May 1787. The site in Marylebone was leased from the Portman estate, and was where Dorset Square now stands. Lord was a ground staff bowler at White Conduit, but he was reckoned to have business acumen, and so he was chosen for the task of finding a new, and private, venue for the club. He was backed against any losses by the Earl of Winchilsea and Colonel Charles Lennox. The White Conduit moved to the new ground soon afterwards, and reconstituted themselves as Marylebone Cricket Club (MCC).

In 1811, feeling obliged to relocate because of a rise in rent, Lord removed his turf and relaid it at his second ground. Now known as the "Middle Ground", it was on the Eyre Estate in St John's Wood, west of Regent's Park. This venture was short-lived because it lay on the route which Parliament determined for the Regent's Canal. The Eyre family offered Lord another plot nearby; and he again relocated his turf.

The new ground, also in St John's Wood, had both a duck pond and a pronounced slope which runs diagonally across the field from north to south. In terms of the modern ground, this is from the Grand Stand (north side) down to the Tavern and Mound Stands in the south. The drop is around 8 ft 2 in (2.49 m). Bowlers operating from the Pavilion End are bowling downhill; and uphill from the Nursery End.

=== Early years ===
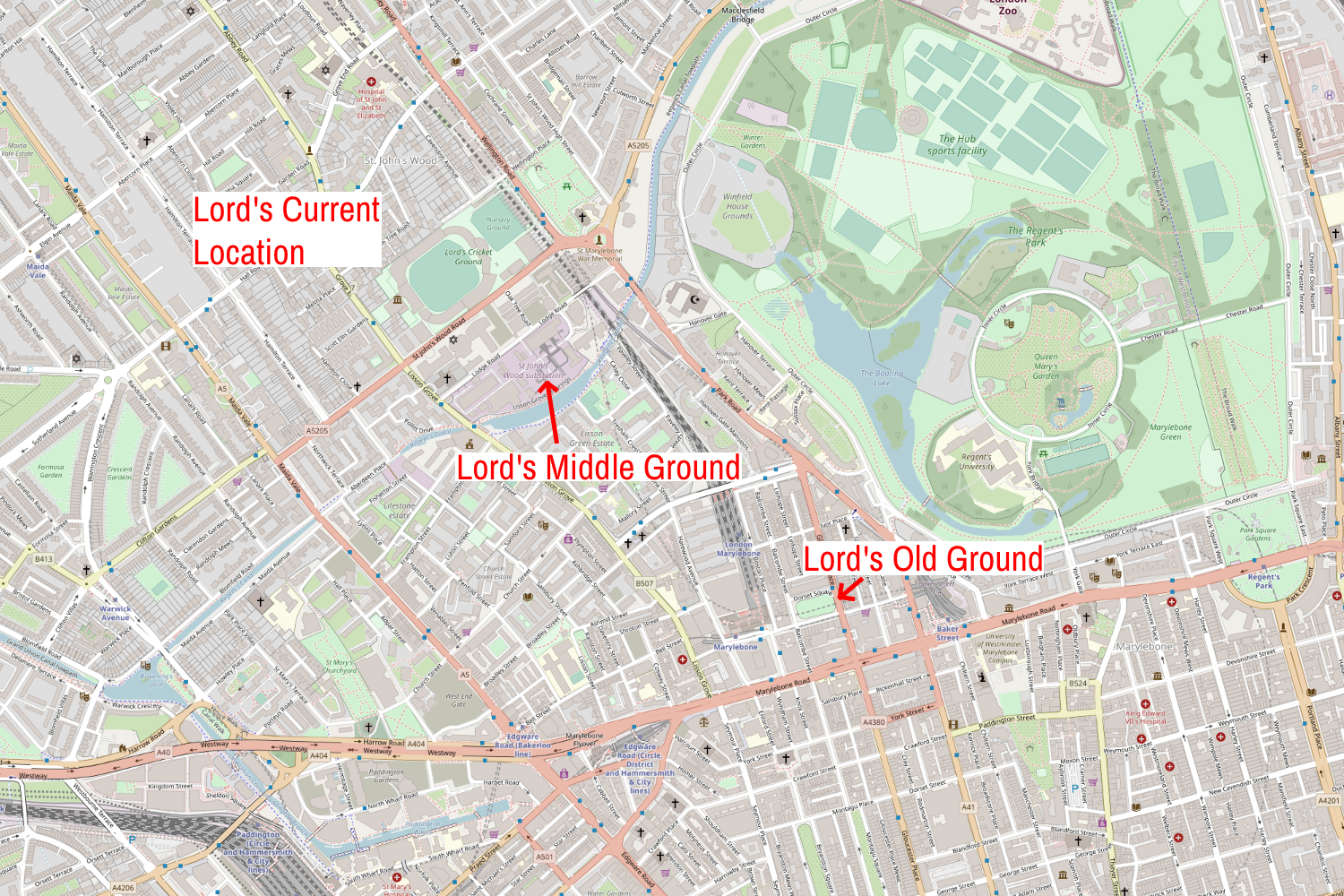
Progression of Lord's ground's locations

Lord's Tavern was built in 1813–14, followed by a wooden pavilion in 1814. The new ground opened in the 1814 season, with MCC playing Hertfordshire in what is believed to have been the first match there on 22 June 1814.

The first century to be scored at the ground was made by Frederick Woodbridge (107) for Epsom against Middlesex in August 1815, with Epsom's Felix Ladbroke (116) recording the second century in the same match. The annual Eton v Harrow match, which had first been played at Lord's Old Ground in 1805, returned to the present ground on 29/30 July 1818. From 1822, the fixture became almost an annual event at Lord's. Lord's witnessed cricket's first double-century when William Ward scored 278 for the MCC against Norfolk in 1820. Ward's effort was a world record score which beat the 167 scored by James Aylward in 1777, and remained unbroken for 56 years until W. G. Grace's innings of 344 in 1876.

The original Lord's Pavilion, which had recently been renovated at great expense, was destroyed by fire on the night of 28 July 1825, following the first Winchester v Harrow match which had been completed that day. MCC's records and archives, including countless unique documents, were lost. The Pavilion was promptly rebuilt by Lord.

Also in 1825, the future of the ground as a whole was placed in jeopardy when Lord proposed redeveloping it with housing. This was at a time when St John's Wood was seeing rapid development. It was prevented by William Ward, who purchased the ground from Lord for £5,000. His purchase was celebrated in the following anonymous poem:

And of all who frequent the ground named after Lord,
On the list first and foremost should stand Mr Ward.
No man will deny, I am sure, when I say
That he's without rival first bat of the day,
And although he has grown a little too stout,
Even Matthews is bothered at bowling him out.
He's our life blood and soul in this noblest of games,
And yet on our praises he's many more claims;
No pride, although rich, condescending and free,
And a well informed man and a City MP.

The first University Match between Oxford and Cambridge was held at Lord's in 1827, at the instigation of Charles Wordsworth, establishing what would be the oldest first-class fixture in the world until 2020. The ground remained under the ownership of Ward until 1835, after which it was handed over to James Dark. The Pavilion was refurbished in 1838, with the addition of gas lighting. Around this time Lord's could still be considered a country ground, with open countryside to the north and west. Lord's was described by Lord Cottesloe in 1845 as being a primitive venue, with low benches put in a circle around the ground at a good distance providing seating for spectators. Improvements to the ground were gradually made, with the introduction of a telegraph scoreboard in 1846. The Pavilion was extended on its north side in 1848 with an annex providing a separate entrance to the cricket field for professional players. In the same year scorecards were introduced for the first time, from a portable press, and drainage was installed in 1849–50.

An Australian Aboriginal cricket team toured England in 1868, with Lord's hosting one of their matches to a mixed response, with The Times describing the tourists as "a travestie upon cricketing at Lord's" and "the conquered natives of a convict colony". Dark proposed to part with his interest in the ground in 1863, for the fee of £15,000 for the remaining 29 1/2 years of his lease. An agreement was reached in 1864, with Dark, who was seriously ill, selling his interests at Lord's for £11,000. The landlord of the ground, Isaac Moses, offered to sell it outright for £21,000 in 1865, which was reduced to £18,150. William Nicholson, who was a member of the MCC Committee at the time advanced the money on a mortgage, with his proposal for the MCC to buy the ground being unanimously passed at a special general meeting on 2 May 1866. Following this purchase, a number of developments took place. These included the addition of cricket nets for members to practice and the construction of a grandstand designed by the architect Arthur Allom, which was built in the winter of 1867–68 and also provided accommodation for the press. The stand was funded by a private syndicate of MCC members, purchased by the club in 1869. The wicket at Lord's was heavily criticised in the 1860s due to its poor condition, with Frederick Gale suggesting that nine cricket grounds out of ten within 20 miles of London would have a better wicket; the condition was deemed so poor as to be dangerous that Sussex refused to play there in 1864.

=== Continued developments ===
By the 1860s and 1870s, the great social occasions of the season were the public school match between Eton and Harrow, the Varsity Match between Oxford and Cambridge, and the Gentlemen v Players, with all three matches attracting great crowds. Crowds became so large that they encroached on the playing area, which necessitated the introduction of the boundary system in 1866. Further crowd control measures were initiated in 1871, with the introduction of turnstiles. The Pavilion was expanded in the mid-1860s and shortly thereafter it was decided to replace the original tavern with a new construction commencing in December 1867. At this time a nascent county game was beginning to take shape. With Lord's hosting more county matches, the pitches subsequently improved with umpires overseeing their preparation.

Middlesex County Cricket Club, which had been founded in 1864, began playing their home games at Lord's in 1877 after vacating Prince's ground in Chelsea, which had been considered a serious rival to Lord's given its noble backers. In 1873–74, an embankment was built which could accommodate 4,000 spectators in four rows of seats. Four years later a new lodge and was constructed to replace an older lodge, along with a new workshop, stables and a store room at a cost of £1,000. To meet the ever-increasing demand of accommodating more spectators, a temporary stand was constructed on the eastern side of the ground. After many years of complaints regarding the poor condition of the Lord's pitch, the MCC took action by installing Percy Pearce as Ground Superintendent in 1874. Pearce had previously held the same position at the County Ground, Hove. His appointment vastly improved the condition of the wicket, with The Standard describing them as "faultless".

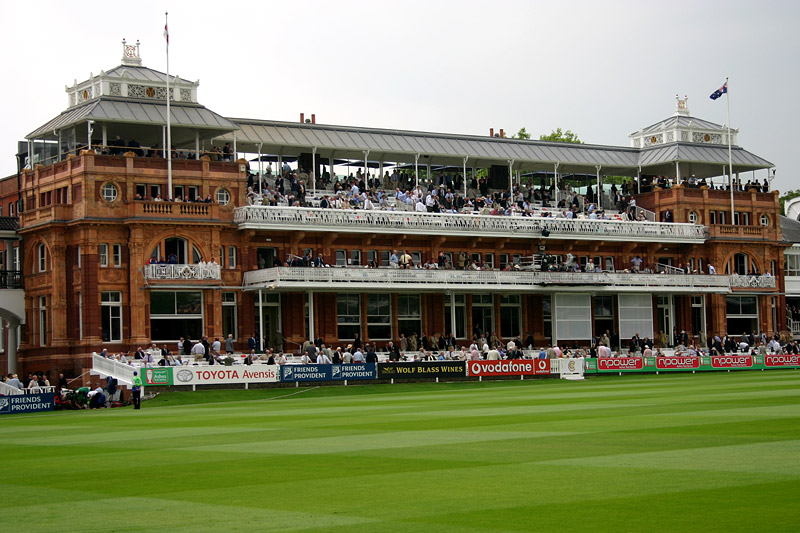
Lord's Pavilion, designed by the architect Thomas Verity and built in 1889–90

The Australian cricket team captained by Dave Gregory first visited Lord's on 27 May 1878, defeating their MCC hosts by 9 wickets. This was considered a shock result and established not only the fame of the Australian team, but also the ongoing rivalry between England and Australia. Lord's hosted its first Test match during The 1884 Ashes, becoming the third venue in England to host Test cricket after The Oval and Old Trafford. The match was won by England by an innings and 5 runs, with England's A. G. Steel and Edmund Peate recording the first Test century and five-wicket haul at Lord's respectively.

As part of the Golden Jubilee Celebrations for Queen Victoria in 1887, the Kings of Belgium, Denmark, Saxony, and Portugal attended Lord's. It was noted that none of them had any grasp of cricket. In the same year Lord's hosted the MCC's hundredth anniversary celebrations, with MCC playing a celebratory match against England. With only a two-tiered covered grandstand and both increasing membership and spectator numbers, it was decided to build a new pavilion at a cost of £21,000. Construction of the new Lord's Pavilion, which was designed by Thomas Verity, took place in 1889–90. The pavilion it replaced was relocated and painstakingly rebuilt on an estate in Sussex, where it lived out its days as a glorified garden shed. Soon after this, the MCC purchased the land to the east, known today as the Nursery Ground; this had previously been a market garden known as Henderson's Nursery which grew pineapples and tulips. The ground was subsequently threatened by the Manchester, Sheffield and Lincolnshire Railway's attempts to purchase land in the area for their line into Marylebone Station. After considering the company's offer, the MCC relinquished a strip of land bordering Wellington Road and was given in exchange the Clergy Orphan School to the south. In order to facilitate the railway into Marylebone Station, the Nursery Ground had to be dug up to allow tunnels to be built between 1894 and 1898 using the cut-and-cover method. Once completed the MS&LR Company laid a new pitch.

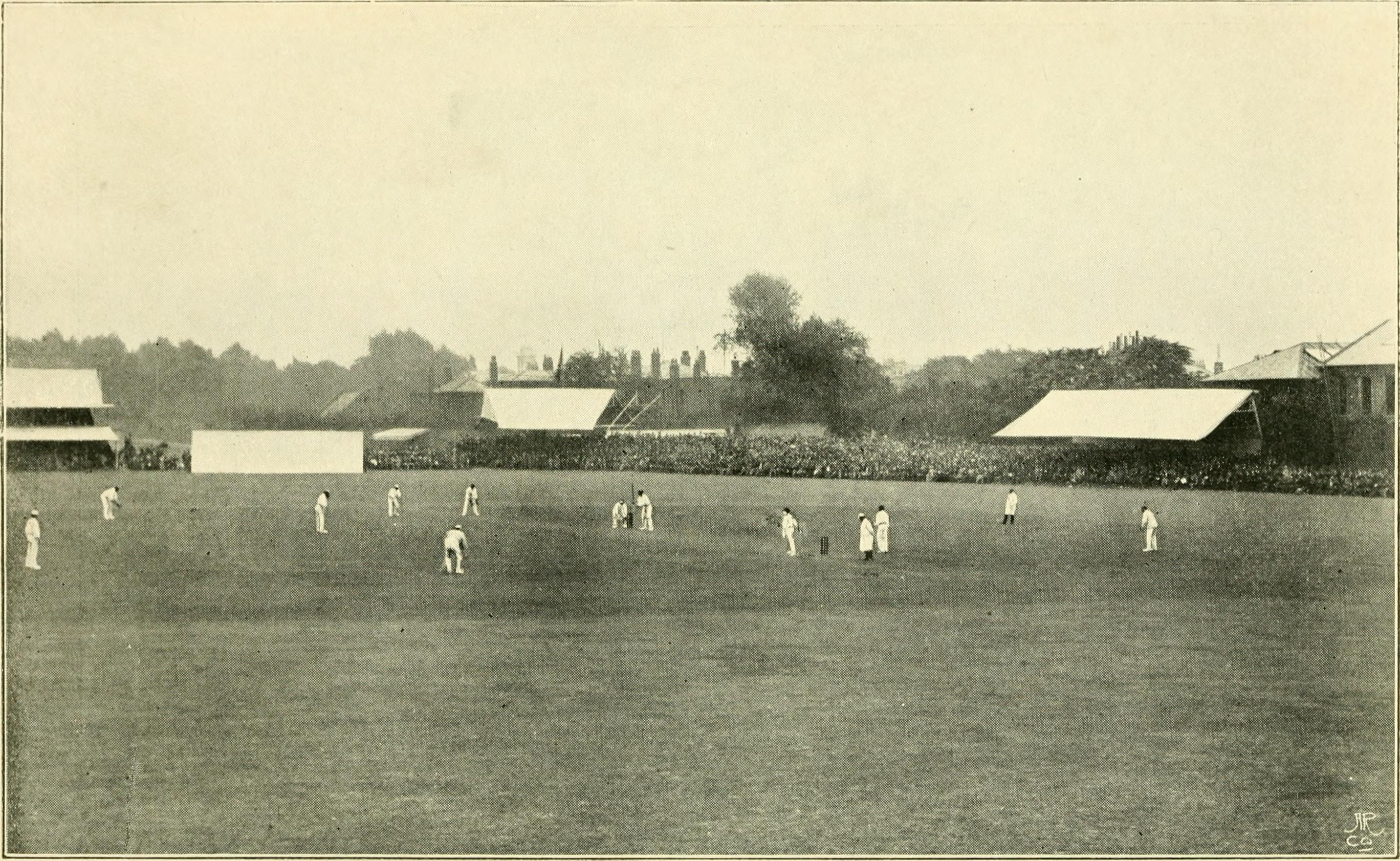
Cricket being played at Lord's in 1899

It was rumoured that subsequent tunnelling under Wellington Road provided the banking for the Mound Stand, which was constructed in 1898–99 on an area previously occupied by tennis and rackets courts. The rapid development of Lord's was not well met by some, with critics mooting Thomas Lord would "turn in his grave" at the ground's expansion. 1899 saw Albert Trott hit a six over the Pavilion while playing for MCC against the touring Australians, remaining as of 2026 the only batsman to do so. The Imperial Cricket Conference was founded by England, Australia and South Africa in 1909, headquartered at Lord's.

Lord's hosted three of the nine Test matches for the ill-fated 1912 Triangular Tournament which was organised by the South African millionaire Sir Abe Bailey. The ground's centenary was commemorated in June 1914 with a match between MCC, whose team was selected from the touring party from England's recent tour of South Africa, and a Rest of England team. The Rest of England won the three-day match by an innings and 189 runs. Lord's was requisitioned by the Army during the First World War, accommodating the Territorial Army (TA), Royal Army Medical Corps (RAMC) and Royal Army Service Corps (RASC). Both cooking and wireless instruction classes were held at the ground for military personnel. Once the RAMC departed, the War Office used the Nursery Ground and other buildings as a training centre for Royal Artillery cadets. The Pavilion and its Long Room were used throughout the war for the manufacture of hay nets for horses on the Western Front. Though requisitioned, Lord's held several charity cricket matches during the war, featuring military teams from the various dominions of the British Empire. These matches were well attended and one such match in 1918 between England and the Dominions was attended by George V and the Duke of Connaught.

=== Inter-war years and WWII ===
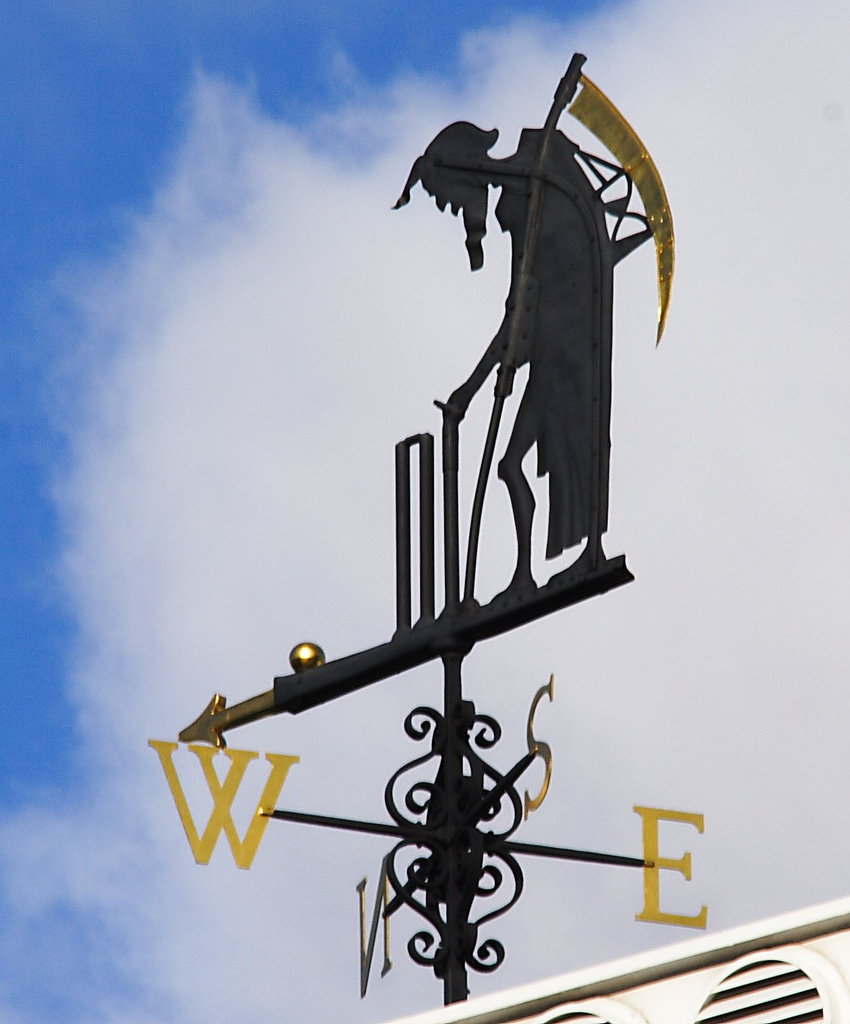
Father Time (pictured) incurred damage from an RAAF Barrage Balloon during World War Two.

First-class cricket returned to Lord's in 1919, with a series of two-day matches in the County Championship. 1923 saw the installation of the Grace Gates, a tribute to W. G. Grace who had died in 1915. They were inaugurated by Sir Stanley Jackson, who proposed including the words THE GREAT CRICKETER in the dedication. These gates replaced the ground's earlier, less decorative, entrance. With attendances growing in number, it was suggested that Lord's should aim to accommodate crowds of up to 40,000 for Test matches; however, its stands were considered inadequate with the Grandstand described as "hopelessly out of date". To accommodate these crowds, the Old Grandstand was demolished and a new one was built in its place in 1926, designed by the architect Sir Herbert Baker. Completion of the stand was delayed due to the 1926 General Strike. Upon its completion, Baker presented MCC with a weather vane of Father Time removing the bails from the stumps, which was placed on top of the Grandstand. The full weathervane is 6 ft 6 in (1.98 m) tall, with the figure of Father Time standing at 5 ft 4 in (1.63 m). Baker further contributed to the landscape of Lord's by designing the Q (now Allen) Stand next to the Pavilion in 1934, while at the Nursery End Stands were also erected. Careful consideration was taken to preserve the treeline dividing the main ground from the Nursery Ground. The West Indies under the captaincy of Karl Nunes played their first Test match at Lord's in 1928. The ground later hosted the first televised Test match during the Second Test of The 1938 Ashes series.

The 1935 season saw the Lord's pitches badly affected by crane fly larvae, known as leatherjackets. The larvae caused bald patches to appear on the pitch and had to be removed by the ground staff, although spin bowlers did gain some benefit from the bare surfaces.

In contrast to the First World War, Lord's was only partially requisitioned by the military during the Second World War. Lord's hosted matches throughout the war for the London Counties cricket team, amongst others, which attracted large crowds. The ground was spared major damage from the Blitz. An oil bomb landed on the Nursery Ground in 1940, with a high-explosive bomb also narrowly missing the Nursery End Stands in December of the same year. The Grandstand and the Pavilion were hit by incendiary bombs, damaging their roofs. AFS firefighters stationed at Lord's reacted quickly and limited the damage. As the war progressed, the threat came not from the Luftwaffe but the newly developed V-1 flying bomb. Lord's had several near misses from these missiles in 1944, with one bomb landing 200 yards (180 m) short of the ground near to Regent's Park. The Nursery Ground had been requisitioned by the Royal Auxiliary Air Force and converted into a barrage balloon site. The most high-profile war damage was that to Father Time, when one such balloon broke loose and drifted toward the Grandstand, catching Father Time and depositing it into the seating at the front of the stand. International cricket resumed at the end of the war, with Lord's hosting one of the Victory Tests (although not accorded Test status) between the Australian Services cricket team and England.

=== Post-war years ===
Following the end of the war attendances at cricket matches grew. The gross attendance of 132,000 and the gate receipts of £43,000 at the Lord's Second Test of The 1948 Ashes series was a record for a Test match in England at that time. This demand necessitated further expansion of the ground, with the construction of the Warner Stand in 1958, which included snack bars and a press box. This stand was the work of the architect Kenneth Peacock and replaced an area of raised ground lined with trees from where it was traditionally possible to watch a match from the comfort of one's own carriage. Prior to the construction of the Warner Stand, all stands at the ground were identified by letters of the alphabet.

The record numbers of spectators who attended Test and County Championship matches began to decline by the end of the 1950s and cricket in England found itself from a position of 2.2 million paid County Championship spectators in 1947, dropping to 719,661 by 1963. To arrest this decline, List A one-day cricket was introduced in 1963, with Lord's hosting its first List A match in the 1963 Gillette Cup between Middlesex and Northamptonshire and later hosted the final of the competition between Sussex and Worcestershire in front of a sell-out 24,000 crowd. It was the first such final held anywhere in the world. Lord's Tavern and its adjoining buildings were demolished in 1968 to make way for the construction of the Tavern Stand, again designed by Peacock. The tavern was subsequently re-sited next to the Grace Gates and was complemented with a banqueting hall. Lord's hosted its first One Day International (ODI) in 1972, with Australia defeating England by 5 wickets. Three years later Lord's hosted the final of the inaugural men's World Cup, with the West Indies triumphing over Australia. Four years later, Lord's held the final of the 1979 World Cup, with the West Indies once against triumphing, this time against England.

The first women's cricket match at Lord's took place in August 1976 when England and Australia played a 60-over ODI which England won by eight wickets. The opportunity to play a women's match at Lord's resulted from lobbying by Rachael Heyhoe Flint, and was given extra impetus by England's victory in the 1973 Women's Cricket World Cup. England's Women XI had to wait another 11 years to play their second match at Lord's. The ground hosted the final of the ICC Women's Cricket World Cup in 1993 with England beating New Zealand to win the World Cup. The ground was not fully opened for the game with only 5,000 spectators attending.

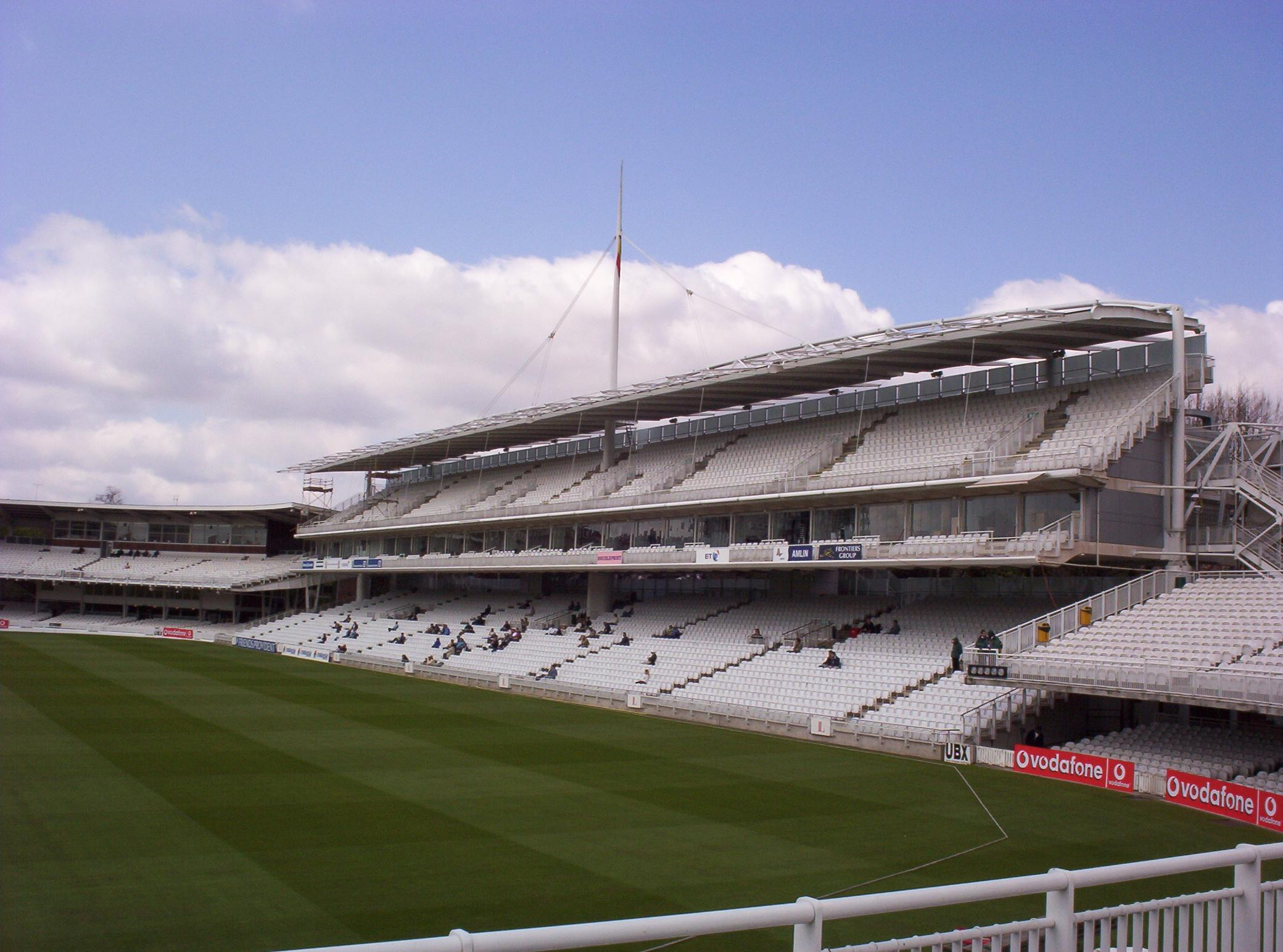
Lord's Grand Stand (pictured), 1998

A new indoor cricket school was completed in 1973 at the Nursery End, launched with £75,000 from Sir Jack Hayward and additional funds raised by the Lord's Taverners and the Sports Council. The West Indies appeared in their third successive World Cup final in 1983, but were defeated by 43 runs by India. The Mound Stand's roof was removed in 1985 to make way for a new upper tier designed by Michael Hopkins & Partners, which opened in time for the MCC's bicentenary in 1987. That bicentenary was celebrated with a five-day match between MCC and a Rest of the World XI in August 1987, which ended in a draw after the final day was rained off.

Graham Gooch made the first Test triple-century at Lord's, scoring 333 against India in 1990. The final decade of the 20th–century saw rapid redevelopment of Lord's. The Compton and Edrich Stands were completed in 1991, having run over time and budget. Its indoor school closed in 1994 being replaced by the new state-of-the-art Lord's Indoor Cricket Centre which opened in 1995. The old grandstand was demolished in 1996, with its replacement designed by Nicholas Grimshaw & Partners being completed in 1998. From 1997, Lord's was home to the European Cricket Council (ECC) till 2010, and remains home to ICC Europe, which administers cricket outside of the European full-member nations. With Lord's hosting three matches in the 1999 World Cup, including the final, the MCC set about improving press facilities by constructing the Media Centre at the Nursery End between the Compton and Edrich Stands, offering commanding views towards the Pavilion from behind the bowler's arm. Lord's Media Centre was opened in April 1999 by then MCC president Tony Lewis.

=== 21st-century developments ===
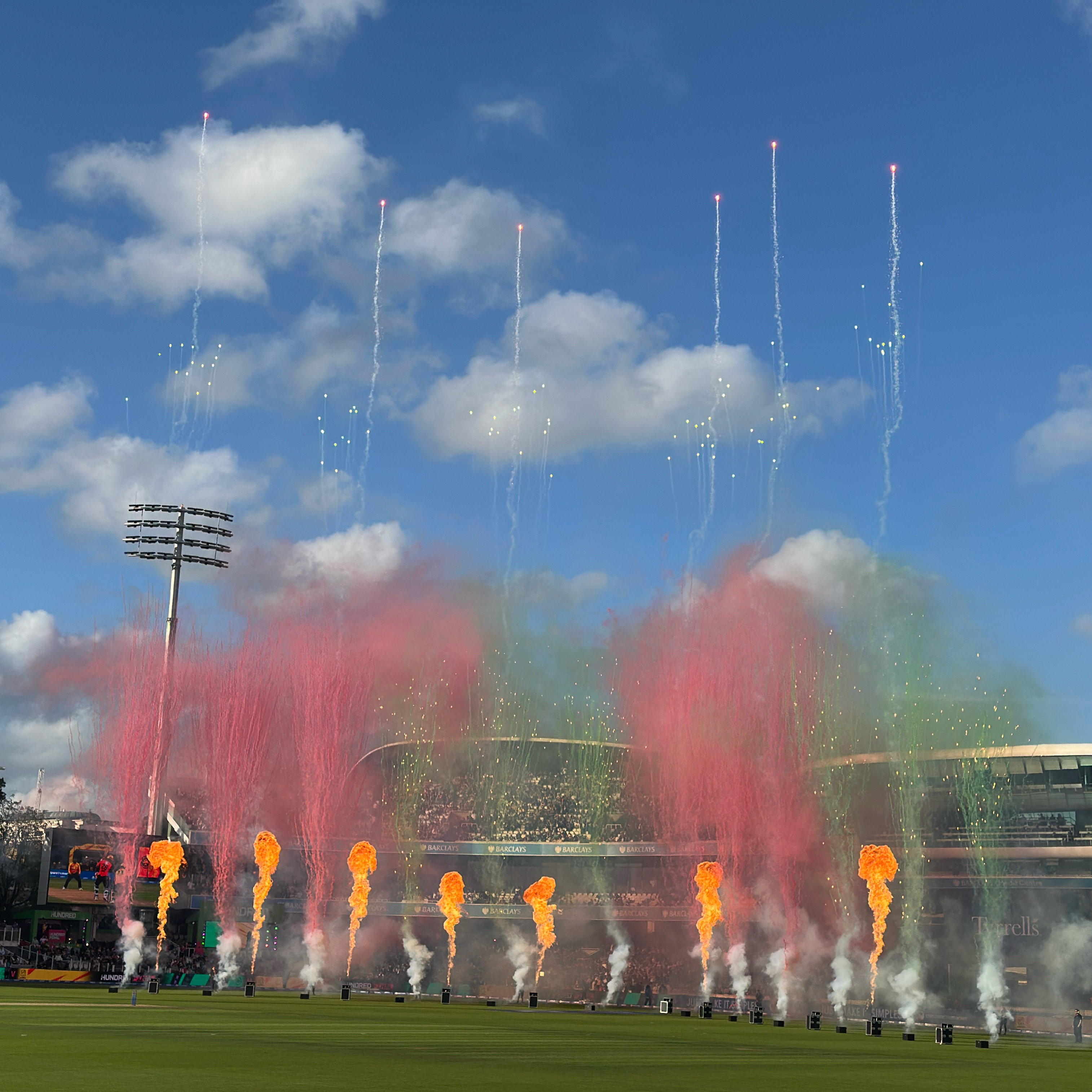
Lord's has hosted the final of The Hundred since 2021.

Lord's hosted its one-hundredth Test match in June 2000, with England defeating the West Indies by two wickets; the match was also notable for the 21 wickets which fell on the second day, the most to fall in a day at a Lord's Test since 1888. The ground also hosted the University Match over three days for the last time in 2000, after which the match alternated between Fenner's at Cambridge and University Parks at Oxford. This fixture continues at Lord's since 2001 as a one-day limited overs match. At the start of the 21st-century, the Lord's slope which offers advantage to both seam and swing bowlers from the Pavilion and Nursery Ends respectively, was under threat of being levelled due to the advent of drop-in pitches. However, the MCC resisted these calls as levelling the pitch would require the rebuilding of Lord's and would mean Test cricket would not be able to be played there for five years. The outfield was notorious for becoming waterlogged due to its clay soil, resulting in considerable lost match time. The entire outfield was relaid in the winter of 2002 with the clay soil being replaced with sand, which has improved drainage. Lord's hosted its first T20 match in the second edition of the Twenty20 Cup in 2004. In 2005 the International Cricket Council (formerly the Imperial Cricket Conference) headquarters, which had been located at Lord's since its foundation in 1909, were closed and moved to the Dubai Sports City in the United Arab Emirates.

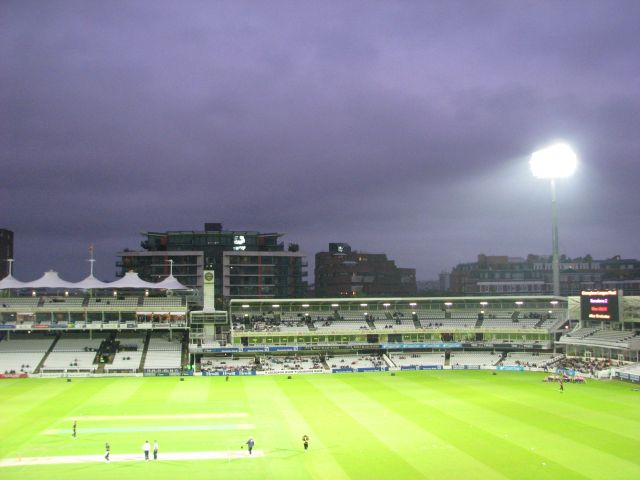
Lord's floodlit Twenty20 match between Middlesex and Kent in 2009

Temporary floodlights were installed at the ground in 2007, but were removed in 2008 after complaints of light pollution from local residents. In January 2009, Westminster City Council approved the use of new 48-metre high retractable floodlights designed to minimise light spillage into nearby residences. Council approval stipulated a five-year trial period during which up to 12 matches and 4 practice matches could be played under lights between April and September, with the lights being dimmed to half-strength at 9.50 pm and switched off by 11 pm. The floodlights were first used successfully on 27 May 2009 during the Twenty20 Cup match between Middlesex and Kent. Two weeks after the first use of the floodlights, Lord's hosted its first Twenty20 International in the World Twenty20 between England and the Netherlands, which resulted in a shock last-ball win for the ICC associate nation. Lord's held the 2009 ICC World Twenty20 Final between Pakistan and Sri Lanka, which Pakistan won by 8 wickets.

In 2008 plans were drawn up by the MCC Committee to fund the future £250 million development of the ground by constructing residential apartments and a luxury hotel along the Wellington Road and Grove End Road. Lord's Masterplan was unveiled in 2013, being a twenty-year plan to redevelop the ground and improve its facilities. The first phase of its Masterplan involved the demolition and replacement of the Warner Stand with a new stand, which was built between 2015 and 2017. The new stand has improved facilities for match officials and reduced the number of restricted-view spectator seats from 600 to 100. Phase two of Lord's Masterplan involved the demolition of the Compton and Edrich Stands in 2019, with their replacements being completed in 2021; these provided an extra 2,000 seats and for the first time were linked by a walkway bridge.

Lord's celebrated the two-hundredth anniversary of its present ground in 2014. To mark the occasion, an MCC XI captained by Sachin Tendulkar played a Rest of the World XI led by Shane Warne in a 50-over match.

Two matches of note were played at Lord's Cricket Ground in July 2019. The first of these was 2019 World Cup Final between England and New Zealand, which ended as a tie with both sides each making 241 runs after 50 overs. The final was then decided by a Super Over, which also resulted in a tie. Thus, the winner was decided on the number of boundaries scored in the game and Super Over; this was England's first World Cup triumph. A second match of note followed four days later when Ireland played their first Test match at Lord's, where they bowled England out for 85 on the first morning of the match with Tim Murtagh taking 5 for 13. Despite this, in their second innings Ireland were dismissed for 38, the lowest Test total at Lord's and lost the match by 143 runs.

In August 2022 the ground's East Gate was renamed the Heyhoe Flint Gate in honour of Baroness Heyhoe Flint.

In February 2026, it was reported that Lord's would undergo an overhaul of the Nursery End which would see the brick "prison" wall removed and a glass-fronted pavilion developed, along with two 12-storey apartment blocks to fund the redevelopment of the Tavern Stand. Potentially, a new Lord's museum, a roof over the currently open-air Compton and Edrich Stands, and transformation of the Thomas Lord building into a café and shop were also ideas considered in the plan.

== Ground features and facilities ==
=== Stands ===
As of 2026, the stands at Lord's are (anti-clockwise from the Pavilion):

Lord's ground map

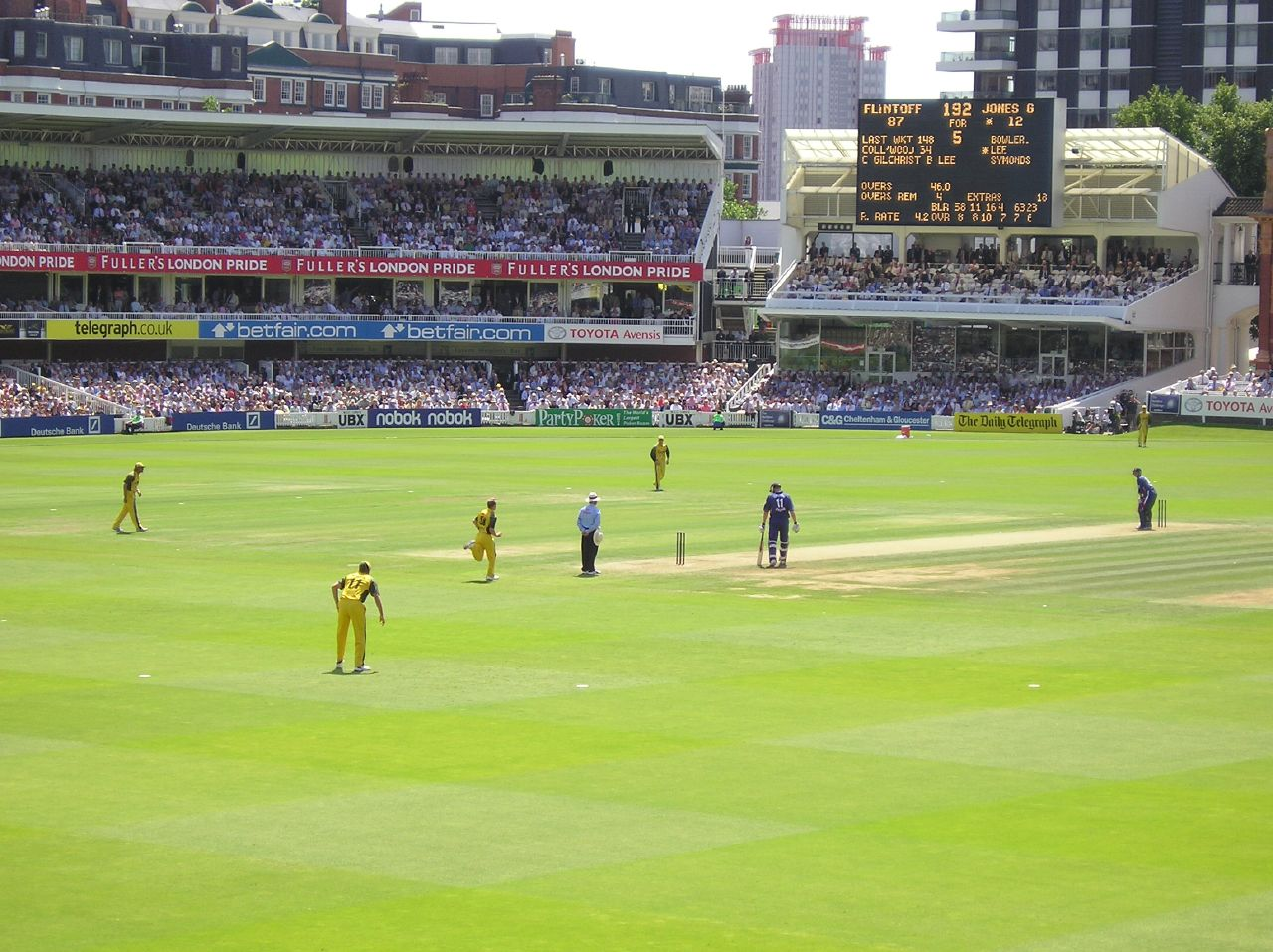
Allen Stand (right)

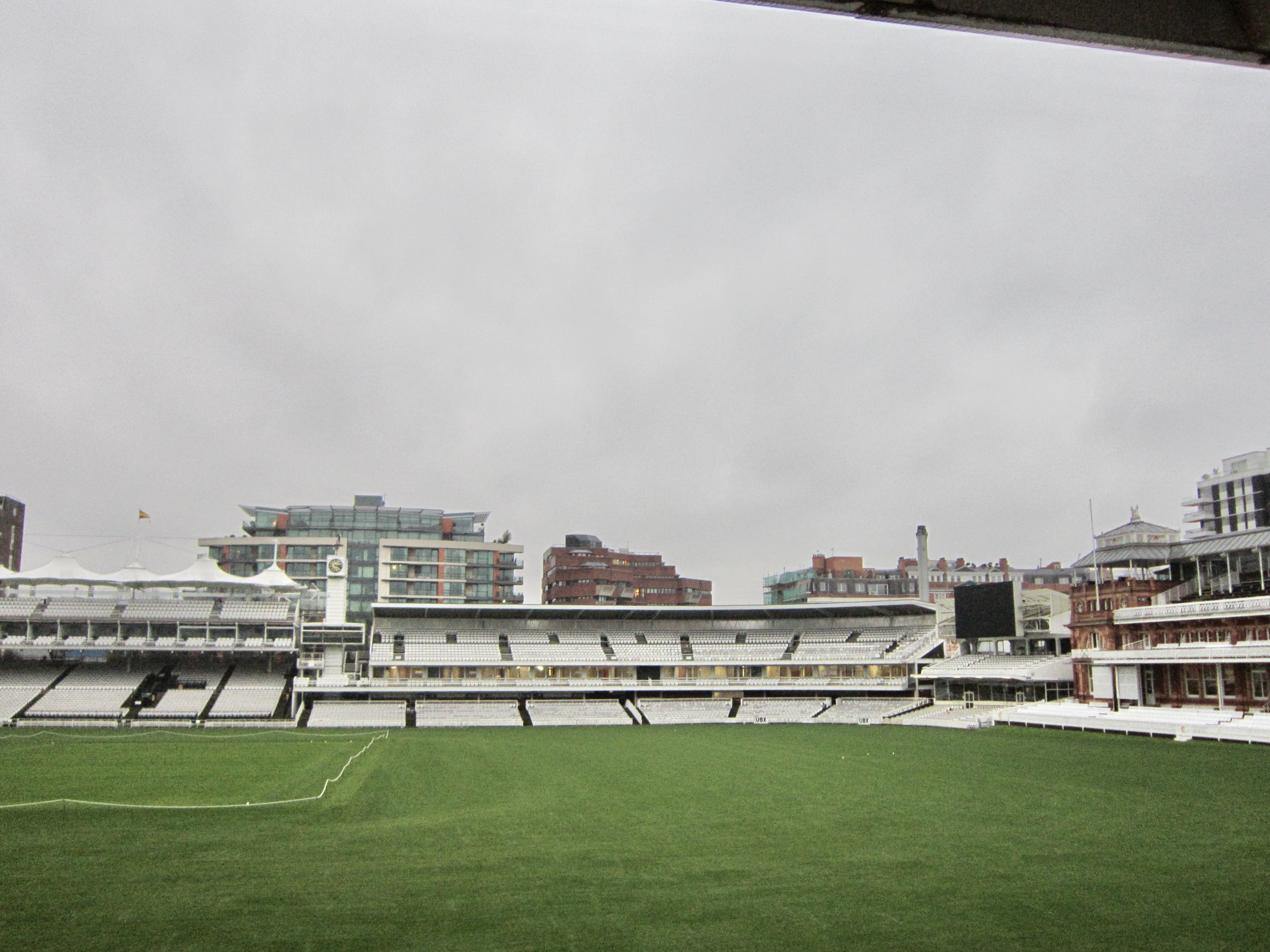
Tavern Stand

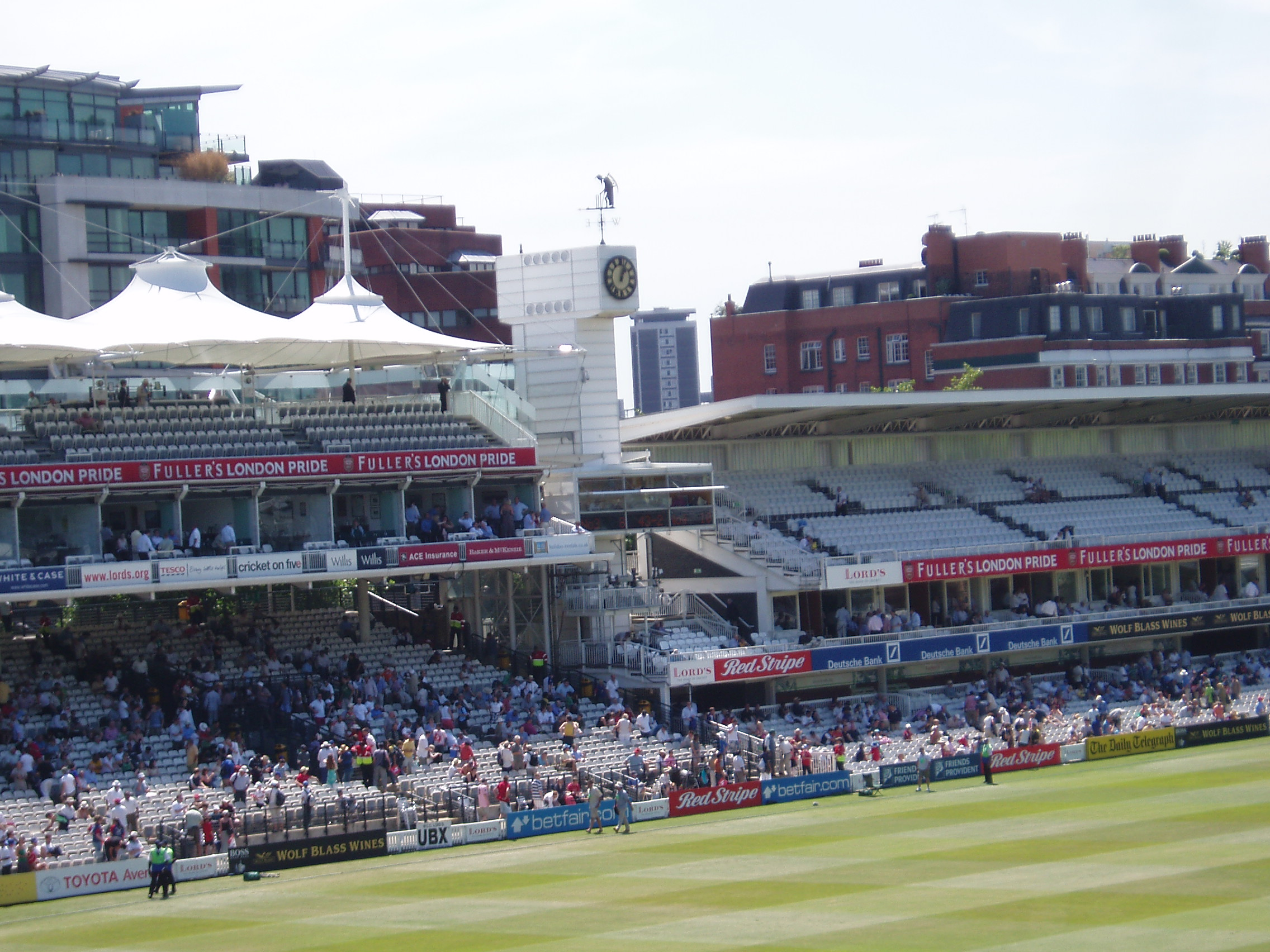
Mound Stand (left)

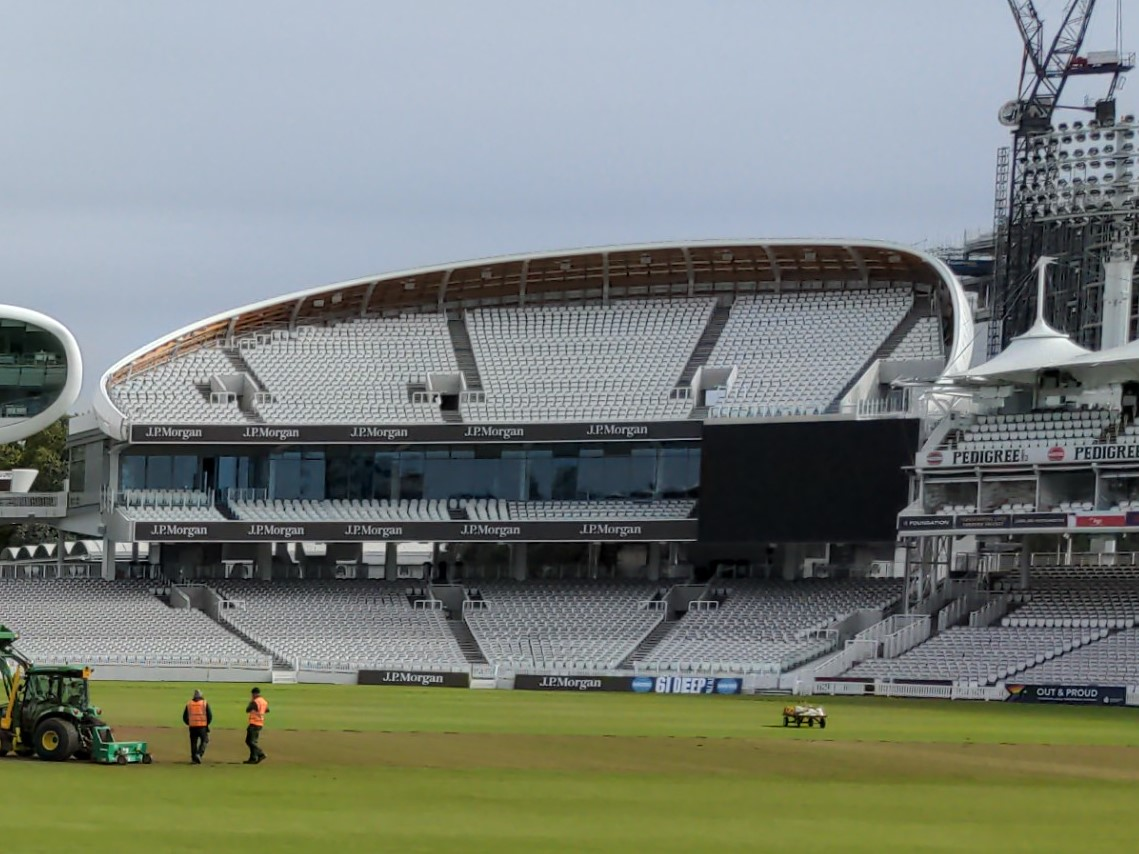
Edrich Stand

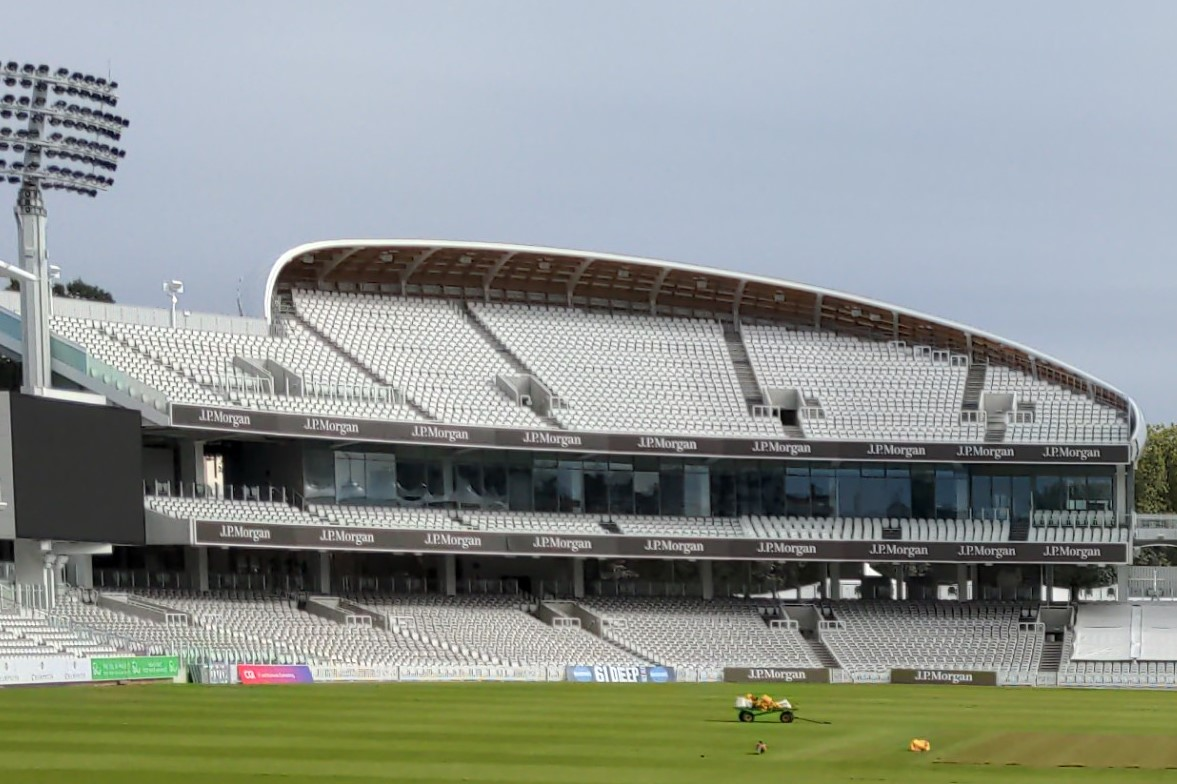
Compton Stand

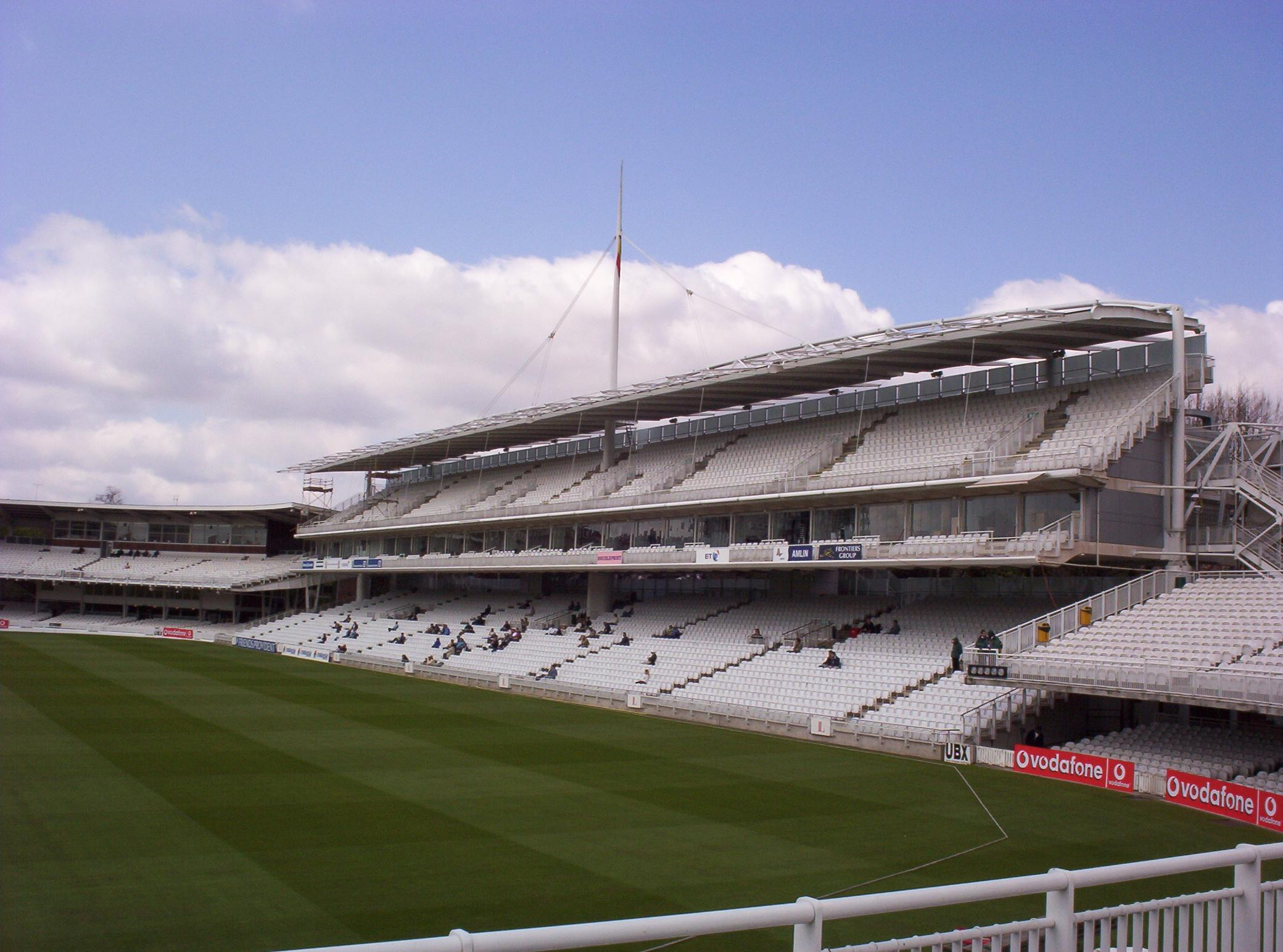
Grand Stand

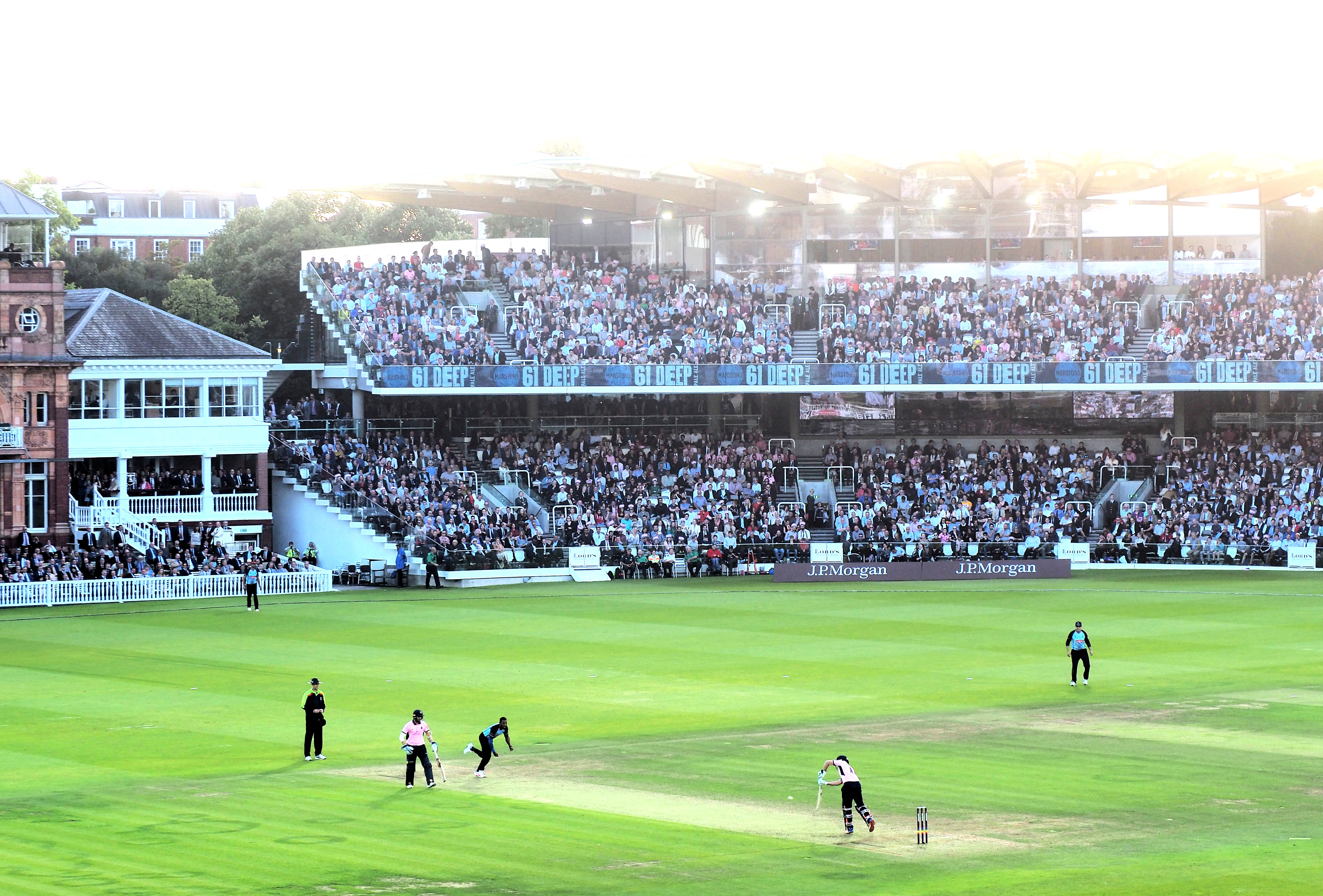
Warner Stand

Many of the stands were rebuilt in the late 20th century. In 1987 the new Mound Stand, designed by Michael Hopkins & Partners, was opened, followed by the Grand Stand, designed by Sir Nicholas Grimshaw, in 1996. The Media Centre, opposite the Pavilion between the Compton and Edrich Stands, was added in 1999. Designed by Future Systems, it won the Royal Institute of British Architects' Stirling Prize for 1999. The redevelopment of the Compton and Edrich Stands was completed in 2021, adding 2,600 seats and bringing the ground capacity to 31,100 spectators. The two ends of Lord's pitch are the Pavilion End (south-west), for MCC members, and the Nursery End (north-east), dominated by the Media Centre.

The current Grand Stand replaced that built in 1926 by Sir Herbert Baker. Although the stand was described as "truly a thing of beauty, loved by all who gazed upon it", it did have limitations for spectators: 43% of the seats had an obstructed view of the playing area and the structure itself was becoming rotten.

=== Pavilion ===
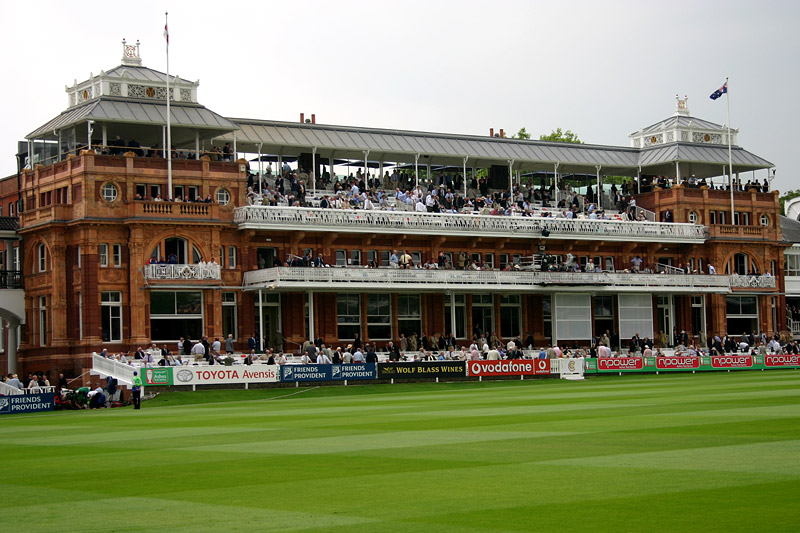
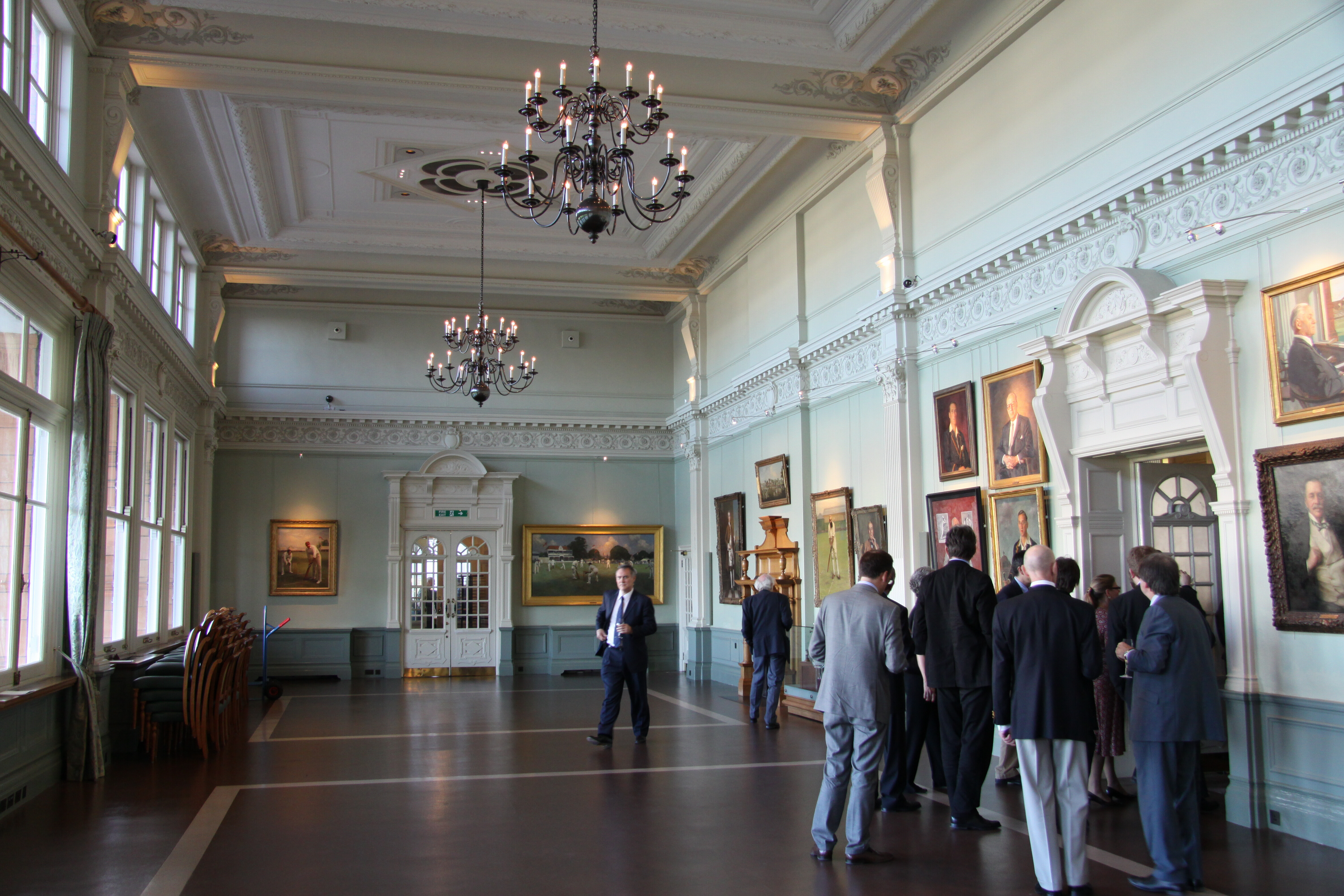
The Victorian-era Lord's Pavilion (left) and historic Long Room (right)

The current Lord's Pavilion is the ground's third and is its principal surviving Victorian edifice, having been built in 1889–90. It has been a Grade II* listed building since September 1982. The Pavilion was constructed using brick with ornate terracotta facing, which includes terracotta gargoyles, such as "The Patriarch" which is understood to represent Lord Harris. The building consists of a long, two-storey centre section with covered seating between two end-towers which are capped with pyramidal roofs which have ornate wrought and cast iron lanterns. Running the full length behind the Upper Tier is the Pavilion's Roof Terrace, which affords panoramic views of the ground. It underwent an £8 million refurbishment programme in 2004–05. The Pavilion provides inside and outdoor seating for MCC members to watch cricket including in the Long Room, the Bowlers' Bar as well as many other vantage points. Middlesex County Cricket Club and visiting counties' members can enjoy use by reciprocity of Lord's Pavilion on match days. The Pavilion also comprises the players' dressing rooms with respective viewing balconies.

The Long Room on the ground floor has been described by Wisden's Lawrence Booth as "the most evocative four walls in world cricket". Players proceed through the Long Room on their way from the dressing room to the cricket pitch; this walk can be notoriously long and complex at Lord's. On his Test debut in 1975, David Steele got lost when going out to bat "and ended up in the Pavilion's basement toilets". Upon entering via the Long Room's rear door players take approximately 30 paces before reaching the steps leading onto the playing field. The Long Room is adorned with paintings of famous cricket scenes and distinguished cricket administrators and players from the 18th century to the present day, featuring many English cricketers as well as those from overseas by rotation. For an overseas cricketer to have their portrait hang in the Long Room is considered a great honour, among whom are four Australians: Sir Donald Bradman, Keith Miller, Victor Trumper and Shane Warne.

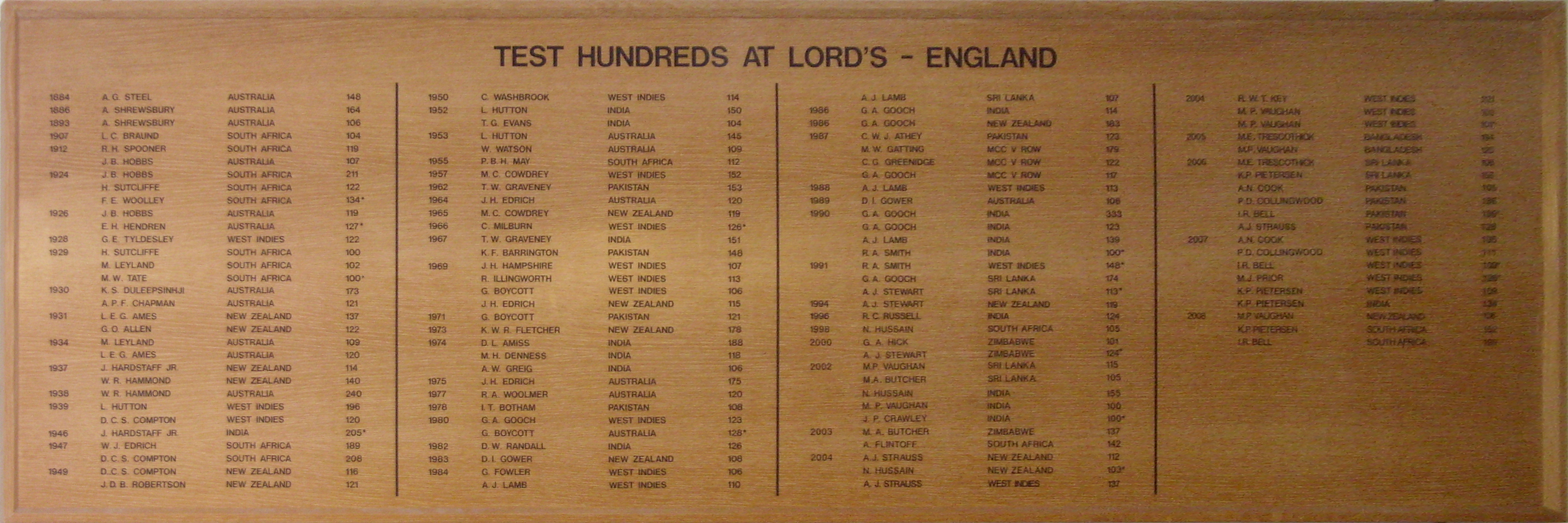
Lord's honours boards, historically celebrating English cricketers, were replaced in 2019.

Displayed in the dressing rooms are the Lord's honours boards, commemorating centuries, five-wicket and ten-wicket hauls for cricket internationals. Two honours boards for batting and bowling commemorate England players in the home dressing room, while the batting and bowling honours boards commemorating overseas international players can be seen in the away dressing room. Originally only these achievements in Test matches were commemorated, but in 2019 Lord's introduced an honours board for ODIs. As of 2026 167 players have made 240 Test centuries at Lord's and 130 players have taken 186 five-wicket hauls. In ODI's 29 players have made 32 centuries at Lord's and 14 players have taken a five-wicket haul. A separate "neutral" honours board was created in 2010 to coincide with Lord's hosting a Test match between Australia and Pakistan. Australians Warren Bardsley and Charlie Kelleway were the first two names added to this board, commemorating their centuries against South Africa in 1912. They were joined by the Australians Shane Watson and Marcus North, who both took five-wicket hauls against Pakistan.

The dress code in the Pavilion remains notoriously strict. Men are required to wear "ties and tailored coats and acceptable trousers with appropriate shoes" and women are required to wear "dresses; or skirts or trousers worn with blouses, and appropriate shoes". Until 1999 ladies – with the exception of Club Patron Queen Elizabeth II – were not permitted to enter the Pavilion during play, due to MCC's longstanding gender-based membership policy. MCC's 1998 decision to admit female members represented a historic modernisation for Lord's Pavilion and similar clubs.

=== Media Centre ===
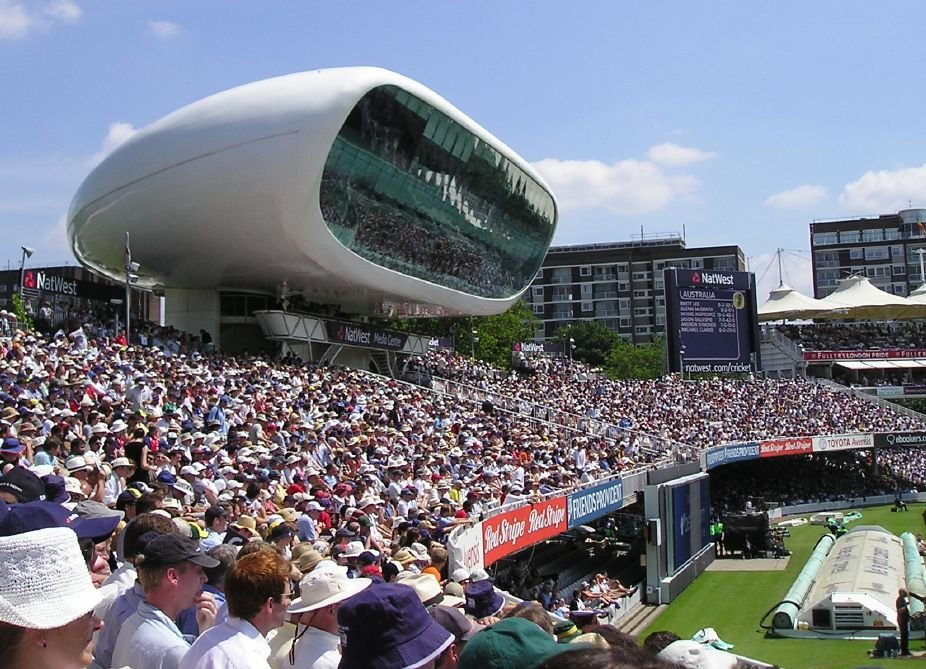
Lord's futuristic Media Centre (pictured)

The decision to build the Media Centre was made during a meeting of the MCC Committee in 1995. These plans sought to remove the previously inadequate media arrangements mostly concentrated in the Warner Stand which could accommodate 90 journalists, along with wooden shacks dotted around the ground for commentators, and replace them with a new purpose-built facility. It was then approved by members of the MCC at a special general meeting in December 1996. A gap between the Compton and Edrich Stands was selected, with space limitations requiring the centre to stand 15 metres (49 ft) above ground level on reinforced supports from the structure around its two lift shafts. This design allowed for uninterrupted access between Lord's Main Ground and the Nursery Ground, while also allowing the movement of ground staff and their equipment.

It was designed by the Future Systems architectural practice led by Czech architect Jan Kaplický and was the first all-aluminium, semi-monocoque building in the world, costing about £5 million. Construction began in January 1997 and was completed in time for the 1999 World Cup. It was built in 32 sections and fitted out by Pendennis Shipyard at Falmouth in combination with Centraalstaal from the Netherlands. These pieces were then delivered to Lord's where they were lowered into place during the 1998 season. The glazing on the front of the Media Centre is inclined 25° so as to eliminate reflections and glare on the pitch to minimise the visual barrier between the media and the players. The lower tier of Lord's Media Centre provides accommodation for 118 journalists, with two hospitality boxes either side which accommodate 18 people each. The top tier has radio and television commentary boxes, consisting of two television studios, two large commentary and radio commentary boxes, each holding up to six people. The centre's only opening window is in the broadcasting box used by BBC Test Match Special. The building won eight architectural awards, including the RIBA Stirling Prize for architecture in 1999. The Media Centre was originally sponsored by NatWest, with sponsorship being taken over by Investec in 2007. From 2011, J. P. Morgan was sponsor, and since 2025, Barclays sponsors Lord's Media Centre.

=== Nursery Ground ===
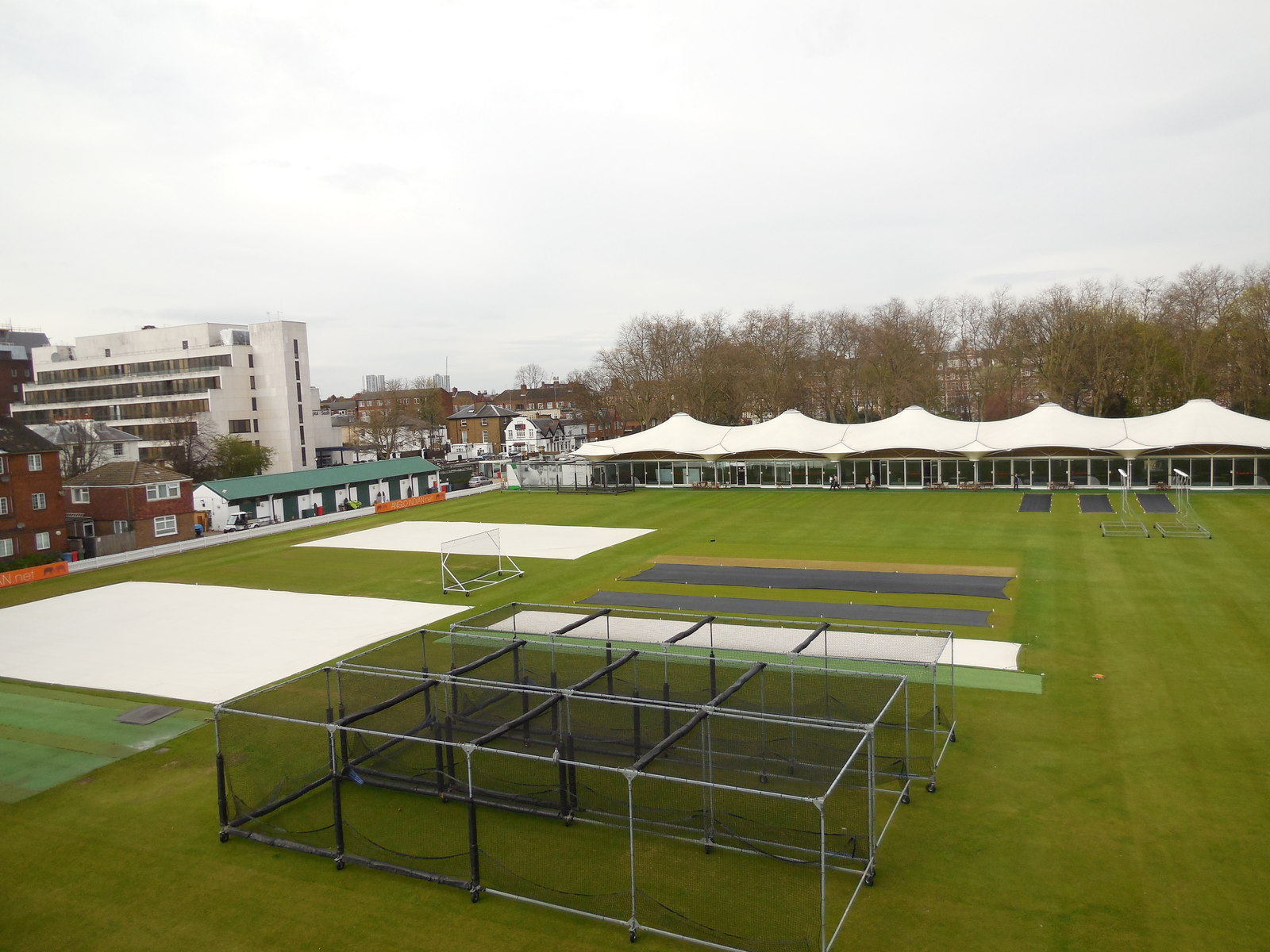
Lord's Nursery Ground (pictured)

Purchased in two parts by the MCC in 1838 and 1887, the ground is primarily used as a practice ground and is considered to have some of the best grass nets in the world. In 1895 the Middlesex Volunteers requested the use of the Nursery Ground as a drill ground, but this was declined by the MCC. The Nursery Pavilion, which was constructed in 1999, overlooks the playing area of the Nursery Ground and is one of London's largest venues. The ground has hosted one first-class cricket match in 1903, when the MCC played Yorkshire; the match was originally to be played on Lord's main ground, but heavy rain had fallen and in the week leading up to the match this had led to the abandonment of a match between the MCC and Nottinghamshire. The heavy rain persisted during the MCC v Yorkshire match, with the players spending the first two days of the three-day match sitting in the pavilion. However, it was deemed that the playing surface on the Nursery Ground was suitable for the third day of the match to be played there, with both sides each batting for an innings and Yorkshire's Wilfred Rhodes making an unbeaten 98.

The Women's University Match was played on the Nursery Ground from 2001, however following calls for gender equality, the 20-over fixture is played on the main Lord's ground since 2022 alongside the men's fixture. On big match days crowds are allowed onto the outfield. The Cross Arrows Cricket Club play their home matches at the Nursery Ground towards the end of each cricket season. The construction of the new Compton and Edrich Stands, beginning in August 2019, encroached on the Nursery Ground's playing area. In order to reclaim the playing area lost to the redevelopment of the stands, the temporary Nursery Pavilion will be demolished in 2025–26 and the playing area will be extended up to the perimeter wall running beside the Wellington Road.

=== MCC Museum and Library ===
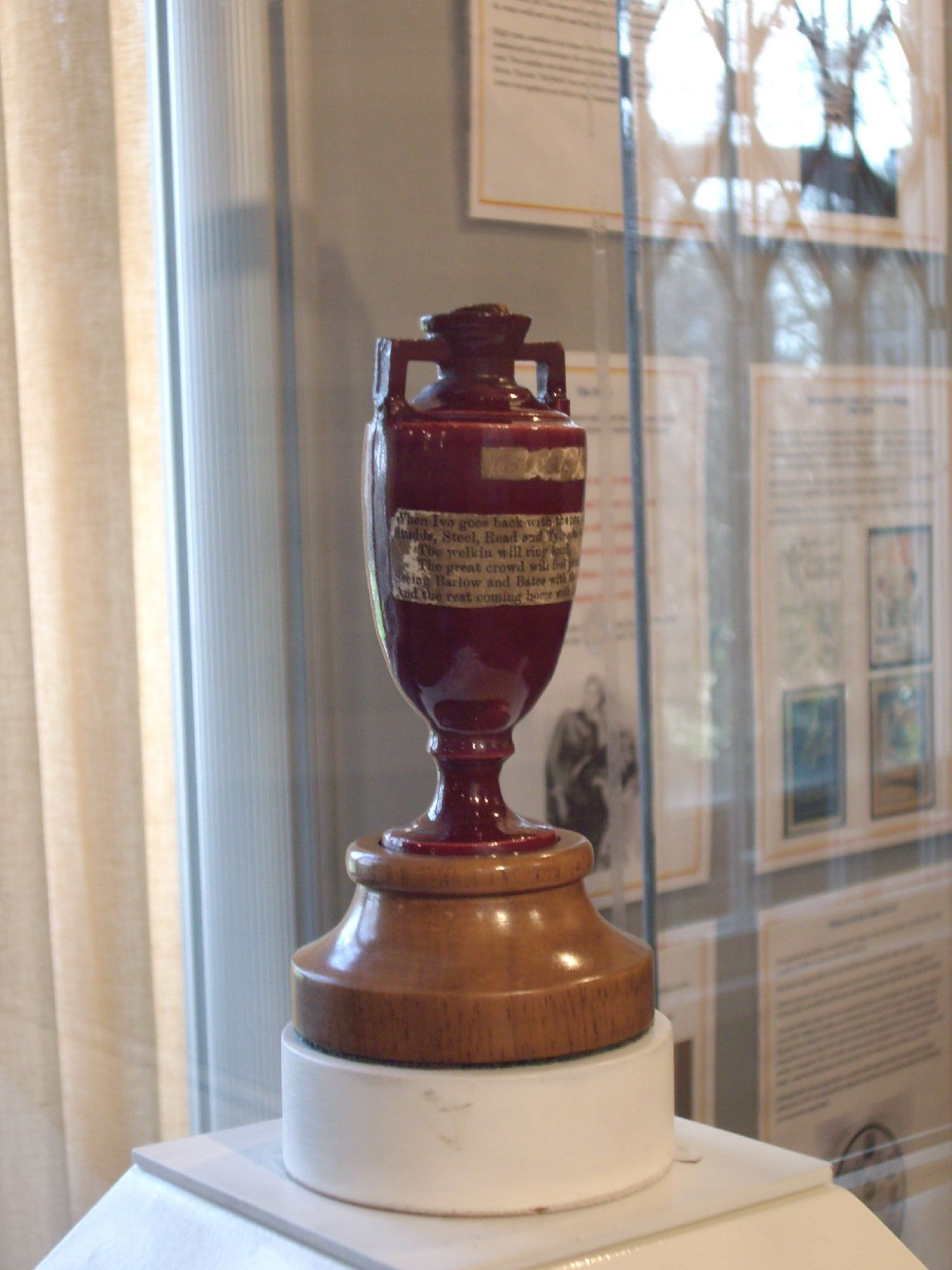
The Ashes urn on display at the Lord's Museum

Lord's is the home of the MCC Museum, which is the oldest sports museum in the world, and contains the world's most celebrated collection of cricket memorabilia, including The Ashes urn. MCC has been collecting memorabilia since 1864, its collection being originated by Sir Spencer Ponsonby-Fane, who subsequently became the Club Treasurer. These items were originally displayed in the Pavilion, limiting access to the collection to MCC members. Following the Second World War the collection had outgrown its home in the Pavilion, with a decision made to relocate the collection and open it to the public. The MCC moved the collection to a disused rackets court, which had fallen into disrepair during the war, with this location also acting as a memorial to the fallen members of the MCC from the two World Wars. MCC appointed Diana Rait Kerr, "to whom the game owes a great debt", as the first full-time founding curator of its museum and library, a position she held from 1945 to 1968. The museum was officially opened to the public as the Imperial Memorial Collection by the Duke of Edinburgh in 1953. During her tenure as curator, Rait Kerr secured donations of pictures, cricket equipment and other artefacts from around the world. Rait Kerr was succeeded as curator by Stephen Green in 1968. The museum today welcomes around 50,000 visitors per year.

Amongst the items on display include cricket kit used by Victor Trumper, Jack Hobbs, Don Bradman, Shane Warne, and others; many items related to the career of W. G. Grace; and curiosities such as the stuffed sparrow that was 'bowled out' by Jahangir Khan of Cambridge University in delivering a ball to T. N. Pearce batting for the MCC on 3 July 1936. It also contains the battered copy of Wisden that helped to sustain E. W. Swanton through his captivity in a Japanese prisoner-of-war camp during the Second World War. It continues to collect historic artefacts and also commissions new paintings and photography. It contains the Brian Johnston Memorial Theatre, a cinema which screens historical cricket footage for visitors. The museum collaborates with a number of national museums and schools through active loans, in addition to community and tour programmes. It is a member of the Sporting Heritage network.

Lord's also has one of the largest and most comprehensive collections of books and publications dedicated to cricket. The MCC Library includes over 20,000 volumes and grows by around 400 volumes a year, and encourages donations from authors and publishers. It operates as a private library for MCC members on match days, but is open by appointment on non-match days. It was expanded in the 1980s with the opening of a new library in the tennis court block to the rear of the pavilion, having previously been housed in the Pavilion's Old Library before relocating to a small dedicated office space. In 2010, a selection of 100 duplicates from MCC's library collection was offered for auction by Christie's with proceeds going to its support.

=== Gardens ===
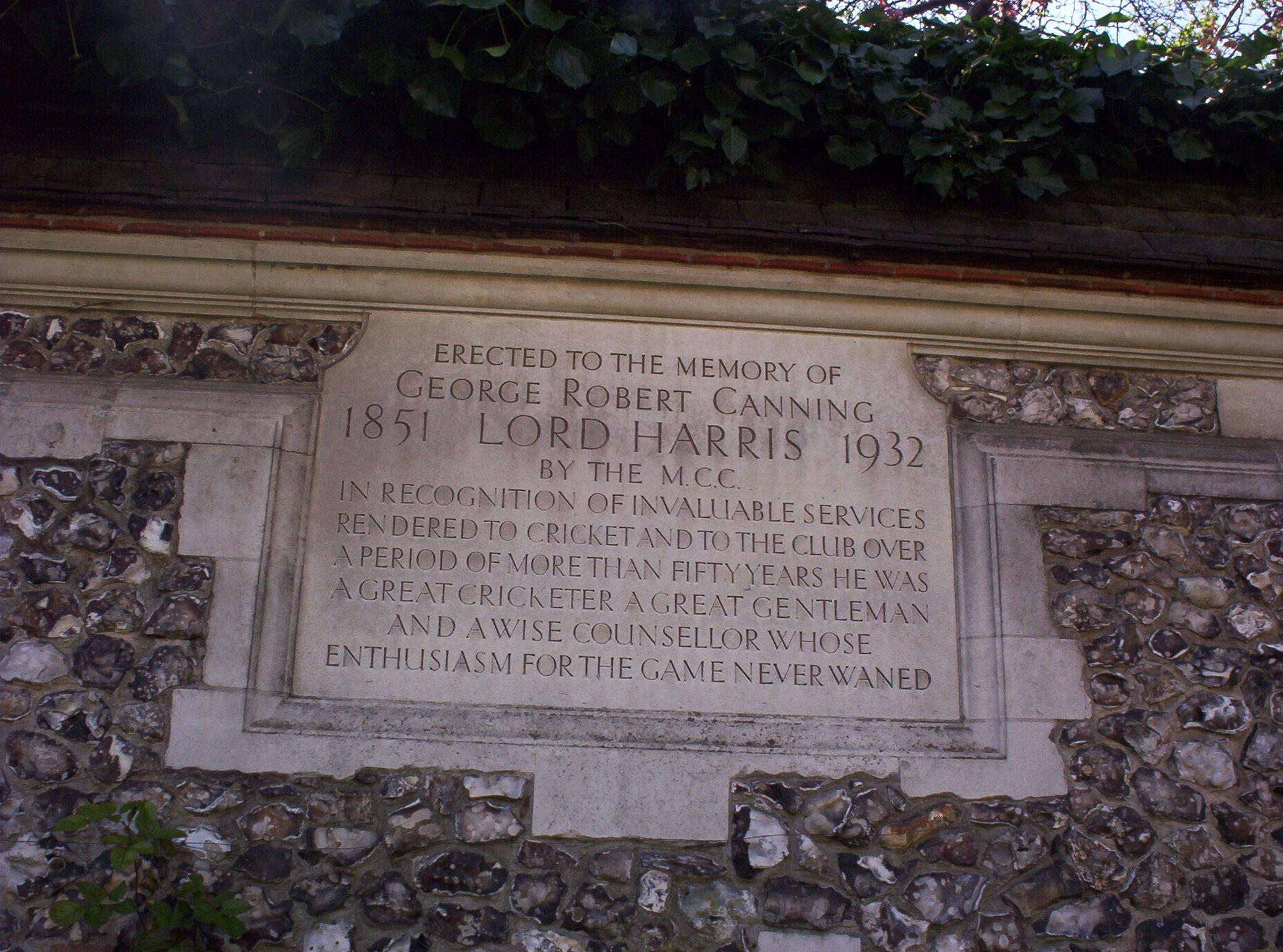
Memorial tablet (pictured) to Lord Harris in the Harris Garden

Lord's has two gardens, the Harris Garden and the Coronation Garden. The Coronation Garden was created behind the A Stand (Warner Stand) in 1952 to celebrate the coronation of Elizabeth II. It contains weeping ash and other trees, providing a shaded area under which benches are found. Preserved in the Coronation Garden is one of the first models of mass-produced, cast iron, heavy rollers dating from the 1880s, which was in use at Lord's until 1945. A large bronze statue of W. G. Grace stands in the Coronation Garden. The garden is popular with picnickers during major matchdays. The Harris Garden, formerly tennis courts, was created as a rose garden in 1934 in memory of Lord Harris. The garden was restored and re-launched in 2018. The restoration included the exposing of the flint wall which runs along the back of the garden, and displays a memorial to Lord Harris. The flower beds in the Harris Garden were replanted in 2018 with a floral design featuring flowers from all the Test-playing nations. The Harris Garden is available for private hire and can host up to 300 people.

== Other sports ==
Lord's 1874 baseball match between the Boston Red Stockings and Philadelphia Athletics

Sir Pelham Warner was of the opinion that the only other sport which had any proper standing at Lord's was real tennis. A real tennis court began construction in October 1838, with the court's foundation stone being laid by Benjamin Aislabie. The court was built at a cost of £4,000, which at the time was exceptionally high. A real tennis competition was later established in 1867. The tennis court was demolished in 1898 to make way for the Mound Stand, with a replacement court being built behind the Pavilion in 1900 in the back garden of number 3 Grove End Road. By 2005 the MCC had a real tennis playing membership of 200. The playing of rackets at Lord's dates from 1844 and is currently played in the tennis block. Lord's hosted the Public Schools Championship in 1866, with Harrow School triumphing. Since then the Championship has been held at Prince's Club, before moving to Queen's Club.

With the advent of lawn tennis, a decision was made at the annual general meeting of the MCC in May 1875 to construct a tennis court, although there was strong opposition from some members. A suggestion to standardise the rules of tennis was made at Lord's by J. M. Heathcote, who was himself a pre-eminent real tennis player. On 3 March 1875 the MCC, in its capacity as the governing body for rackets and real tennis, convened a meeting at Lord's to determine the various versions of lawn tennis which existed with the aim to fully standardise the game's rules. Amongst the various versions of lawn tennis which were demonstrated were Major Clopton Wingfield's Sphairistikè, and John H. Hale's Germains Lawn Tennis. After the meeting, the MCC Tennis Committee was tasked with framing the rules. On 29 May 1875 the MCC issued the Laws of Lawn Tennis, the first unified rules for lawn tennis, which were adopted by the club on 24 June. These rules were amended by the All England Lawn Tennis and Croquet Club for the 1877 Wimbledon Championship, with the dimensions of the tennis courts being based on those at Lord's; the courts on which these were based are no longer used for tennis and now form part of the Harris Garden.

The original intention for the purchase of the northern part of the Nursery Ground in 1838 was for it to serve as an archery venue. Archery is recorded as having been played at Lord's as far back as August 1844, when visiting Ioway Indians camped at Lord's and demonstrated their archery skills. Lord's was one of London's venues for the 2012 Summer Olympics, hosting the archery competition. The 2012 Olympics Archery competition took place in front of the Pavilion, where the archers were positioned, with the targets placed 70 metres away just past the square and before Lord's Media Centre. Either side of the square temporary stands holding up to 5,000 spectators were erected.

Lacrosse was first played at Lord's in 1833 by Canadian pioneers of the sport. Lacrosse returned to Lord's in 1876, when a team of Canadian Gentlemen Amateurs led by William George Beers played an exhibition match at the ground against the Iroquois Indians. A Canadian lacrosse team toured Great Britain again in 1883, with one exhibition match being staged at Lord's in front of several thousand spectators. It was then played again at Lord's in October 1953 when the Kenton and Old Thorntonians Lacrosse Clubs met in a lacrosse championship match, with further fixtures following in November of the same year.

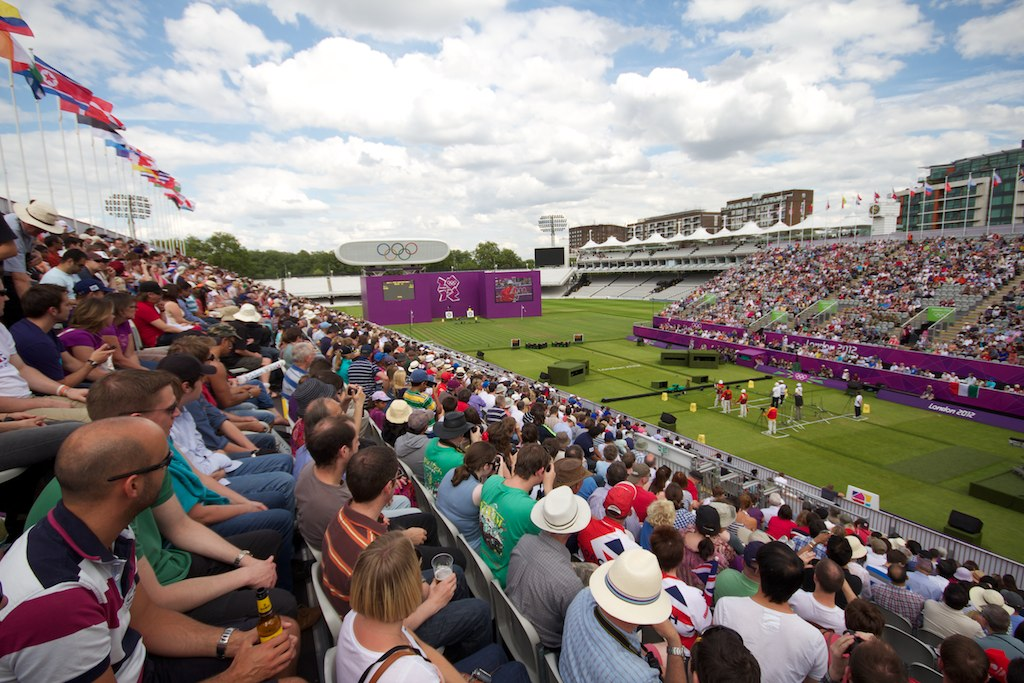
Lord's archery at the 2012 Summer Olympics

Baseball was first played at Lord's in 1874 when the MCC hosted a touring party of 22 baseball players from the Boston Red Stockings and Philadelphia Athletics, being the two leading American baseball teams of the time. The Red Stockings defeated the Athletics 24–7 in front of a crowd of 5,000 spectators. A baseball game was held at Lord's during the First World War to raise money for the Canadian Widows' and Orphans' Fund. A Canadian baseball team then played a team of American London residents in a match attracting 10,000 spectators.

Lord's hosted London's 1967 pre-1968 Olympics field hockey tournament. One match saw India play Pakistan, broadcast live on the BBC which at the time was unprecedented for field hockey. Pakistan won the match 1–0, while Pakistan also went on to defeat Belgium later in the warm-up tournament, before becoming Olympic Champions the following year. Lord's hosted further international hockey matches during the 1970s. The University Match between Oxford and Cambridge Hockey Clubs took place at Lord's for twenty one years beginning in 1969. England beat World Champions India for the first time ever at this venue, in 1978.

Other sports played at Lord's include lawn bowls and billiards. In 1838, a bowling green was constructed at the western end of the ground, and then a billiard room with two tables was added to the old Tavern, where professional billiards players competed on Mondays during the cricket season; In the late 1840s and early 1850s, Lord's held Galloway pony races after the cricket season was over, with races starting at the Tavern and finishing twenty yards south of the Pavilion.

== International records ==
=== Test ===
- Highest team total: 729/6 declared by Australia v England, 1930
- Lowest team total: 38 all out by Ireland v England, 2019
- Highest individual innings: 333 by Graham Gooch for England v India, 1990
- Best bowling in an innings: 8/34 by Ian Botham for England v Pakistan, 1978
- Best bowling in a match: 16/137 by Bob Massie for Australia v England, 1972

=== One-Day International ===
- Highest team total: 387/3 (50 overs) by England v India, 2026
- Lowest team total: 107 all out (32.1 overs) by South Africa v England, 2003
- Highest individual innings: 138* by Viv Richards for West Indies v England, 1979
- Best bowling in an innings: 6/24 by Reece Topley for England v India, 2022

=== Twenty20 International ===
- Highest team total: 199/4 (20 overs) by West Indies v ICC World XI, 2018
- Lowest team total: 93 all out (17.3 overs) by the Netherlands v Pakistan, 2009
- Highest individual innings: 78 by Mahela Jayawardene for Sri Lanka v Ireland, 2009
- Best bowling in an innings: 4/11 by Shahid Afridi for Pakistan v the Netherlands, 2009

All records correct as of 16 November 2026.

== Domestic records ==
=== First-class ===
- Highest team total: 655 by Middlesex v Glamorgan, 2024
- Lowest team total: 15 by Marylebone Cricket Club (MCC) v Surrey, 1839
- Highest individual innings: 335* by Sam Northeast for Glamorgan v Middlesex, 2024
- Three bowlers have taken a ten-wicket haul in an innings where the exact bowling figures are not recorded; however it is known they conceded less than 20 runs: they are Edmund Hinkly, William Lillywhite and John Wisden; the best bowling figures in an innings where the records are complete are by Samuel Butler with 10/38 for Oxford University v Cambridge University in 1871.
- William Lillywhite took the most wickets in a match with 18, for the Gentlemen in the Gentlemen v Players fixture of 1837, though his exact bowling figures are not recorded.

=== List A ===
- Highest team total: 368/2 (50 overs) by Nottinghamshire v Middlesex, 2014
- Lowest team total: 57 (27.2 overs) by Essex v Lancashire, 1996
- Highest individual innings: 187* by Alex Hales for Nottinghamshire v Surrey, 2017
- Best bowling in an innings: 7/22 by Jeff Thomson for Middlesex v Hampshire, 1981

=== Twenty20 ===
- Highest team total: 237/6 (20 overs) by Essex v Middlesex, 2023
- Lowest team total: 78 (16.3 overs) by Middlesex v Somerset, 2024
- Highest individual innings: 121* by Max Holden for Middlesex v Kent, 2023
- Best bowling in an innings: 6/24 by Tim Murtagh for Surrey v Middlesex, 2005

All records correct as of 16 November 2026.

== See also ==
- List of cricket grounds by capacity
- Lists of stadiums

== Bibliography ==
- Altham, H. S.; Swanton, E. W. (1962). A History of Cricket, Volume 1 (to 1914) (5th ed.). London: George Allen & Unwin. OCLC 894274808.
- Barker, Philip (2014). Lord's Firsts. Stroud: Amberley Publishing. ISBN 978-14-45633-29-9.
- Barrett, John (2003). Wimbledon – Serving Through Time. London: Wimbledon Lawn Tennis Museum. ISBN 978-0-906741-32-0.
- Barrett, John (2001). Wimbledon: The Official History of the Championships. London: Collins Willow. ISBN 978-00-07117-07-9.
- Bateman, Colin (1993). If The Cap Fits. Harrow: Tony Williams. ISBN 978-18-69833-21-3.
- Bodleian Library, ed. (2011). The Original Rules of Tennis. Melbourne: Victory Books. ISBN 978-05-22858-38-9.
- Booth, Lawrence (2006). Arm-Ball to Zooter. London: Penguin. ISBN 978-01-40515-81-7.
- Booth, Lawrence (2018). The Shorter Wisden, 2018. London: Bloomsbury Publishing. ISBN 978-14-72953-58-2.
- Collins, Joseph Edmund (1884). Canada under the administration of Lord Lorne. Torrance, California: Rose Publishing Company. OCLC 3661038.
- Evans, Roger D. C. (1991). Cricket Grounds: The Evolution, Maintenance and Construction of Natural Turf Cricket Tables and Outfields. Bingley: Sports Turf Research Institute. ISBN 978-18-73431-00-9.
- Fay, Stephen (2005). Tom Graveney at Lord's. London: Methuen Publishing. ISBN 978-04-13775-30-6.
- Felber, Bill (2013). Inventing Baseball: The 100 Greatest Games of the 19th Century. Phoenix: Society for American Baseball Research. ISBN 978-19-33599-42-7.
- Green, Benny (1987). The Lord's Companion. London: Michael Joseph Ltd. ISBN 978-18-51451-32-6.
- Harris, George; Ashley-Cooper, F. S. (1920). Lord's and the MCC: A Cricket Chronicle of 137 Years. London: Herbert Jenkins Ltd. OCLC 5574343.
- Haygarth, Arthur (1996) [1862]. Scores & Biographies, Volume 1 (1744–1826). Kennington: Frederick Lillywhite. ISBN 978-19-00592-23-9.
- Hughes, Simon (2010). And God Created Cricket. Ealing: Transworld. ISBN 978-14-46422-47-2.
- Meredith, Anthony (2012). Lords Through Time. Stroud: Amberley Publishing. ISBN 978-14-45611-34-1.
- Midwinter, Eric (1981). W. G. Grace: His Life and Times. London: George Allen & Unwin. ISBN 978-00-47960-54-3.
- Nicholson, Matthew (2007). Sport and the Media. Abingdon-on-Thames: Taylor & Francis. ISBN 978-11-36364-97-6.
- Peebles, Ian; Rait Kerr, Diana (1987). Lord's 1946–1970. London: Pavilion Books. ISBN 978-18-51451-41-8.
- Powell, William (1989). The Wisden Guide To Cricket Grounds. London: Stanley Paul. ISBN 978-00-91738-30-3.
- Rae, Simon (1998). W. G. Grace: A Life. London: Faber & Faber. ISBN 978-05-71178-55-1.
- Smith, Ed (2013). Luck: A Fresh Look at Fortune. London: Bloomsbury Publishing. ISBN 978-14-08830-60-4.
- Somerset, Henry, ed. (1894). Tennis, Lawn Tennis, Rackets, Fives. Badminton Library of Sports and Pastimes (3rd ed.). London: Longmans, Green, and Co. OCLC 558974625.
- Vennum, Thomas (2013). American Indian Lacrosse: Little Brother of War. Baltimore: Johns Hopkins University Press. ISBN 978-08-01887-64-2.
- Warner, Pelham (1946). Lords: 1787–1945. London: Harrap. OCLC 877106024.

Events and tenants
Preceded by None	Cricket World Cup; Final Venue; 1975, 1979, 1983	Succeeded by Eden Gardens
Preceded by Gaddafi Stadium	Cricket World Cup; Final Venue; 1999	Succeeded by Wanderers Stadium
Preceded by Melbourne Cricket Ground	Cricket World Cup; Final Venue; 2019	Succeeded by Narendra Modi Stadium
