= Kerbaj =

Kerbaj is a surname. Notable people with the surname include:

- Mazen Kerbaj (born 1975), Lebanese trumpeter and comic book artist
- Richard Kerbaj (born c. 1978), Australian filmmaker, writer, and print journalist
