= Lawrence Booth (disambiguation) =

Lawrence Booth (c.1420–1480) was an archbishop and Chancellor of England.

Lawrence Booth may also refer to:

- Lawrence Booth (cricket writer) (born 1975), English cricket historian and writer
- Lawrence Booth, helped put out Great Seattle Fire
- Lawrence Booth's Book of Visions by Maurice Manning (poet)
- Larry Booth, American architect, part of the Chicago Seven (architects)
