= Rowan Rait Kerr =

Irish-born cricketer, secretary of the MCC

Personal information
- Full name: Rowan Scrope Rait Kerr
- Born: 13 April 1891; Bray, Ireland
- Died: 7 April 1961 (aged 69); Constantine Bay, Cornwall, England
- Batting: Right-handed

Domestic team information
- Years: Team
- 1913/14–1920/21: Europeans

Career statistics
Competition	First-class
Matches	6
Runs scored	89
Batting average	7.41
100s/50s	–/–
Top score	24
Catches/stumpings	3/–
- Source: Cricinfo, 3 January 2022

Colonel Rowan Scrope Rait Kerr MC (13 April 1891 – 7 April 1961) was an Irish-born cricketer and sporting administrator.

Rait Kerr was born in Bray, Ireland third son of Sylvester Rait Kerr of Rathmoyle, Edenderry King's Co and led a distinguished army career. He was educated at Rugby. He graduated from Sandhurst in 1910 and joined the Royal Engineers. By 1916 he had been promoted to temporary captain, and by 1917 he was acting major and had been awarded the Military Cross and the D.S.O.

As a cricketer, he played in six first-class matches. Five of these were for the Europeans in India between 1913–14 and 1920–21, while the other came after a decade's absence from first-class cricket when he appeared for the Army against Oxford University in 1931.

He succeeded William Findlay as Secretary of the Marylebone Cricket Club in 1936 and he retired in 1952. His daughter Diana Rait Kerr became the first Curator of the MCC and she later became one of the first elected lady members of the club in 1999.

Colonel Rait Kerr died at Constantine Bay in Cornwall, aged 69.

== Bibliography ==
- A History of Royal Engineers Cricket 1862-1924, Institute of Royal Engineers, 1925.
- The laws of cricket: Their history and growth, Longmans, Green & Co, 1950.
- Cricket Umpiring and Scoring, Phoenix House, 1964.
- Cricket Umpiring and Scoring - 3rd Revised edition, with Thomas Edward Smith, Littlehampton Book Services Ltd, 1969.
