= My Son the Jihadi =

- Directed by: Peter Beard
- Starring: Michael Evans; Sally Evans; Thomas Evans
- Original language: English

Production
- Executive producer: Brian Woods
- Producer: Richard Kerbaj

Original release
- Network: Channel 4
- Release: 22 October 2015

My Son the Jihadi is a 2015 British documentary directed by Peter Beard. Produced for broadcast television. It was broadcast on 22 October 2015 on Channel 4.

== Synopsis ==
The documentary is about a British mother, Sally Evans, whose son, Thomas, had been recruited by and joined the Islamist terrorist organisation, Al-Shabaab, in Somalia.

== Awards ==
Year	Award	Category	Result
2016	44th International Emmy Awards	Best Documentary	Nominated
2016	British Academy Television Awards	Best Single Documentary	Won
