= Father Time (weathervane) =

Weathervane at Lord's Cricket Ground, London

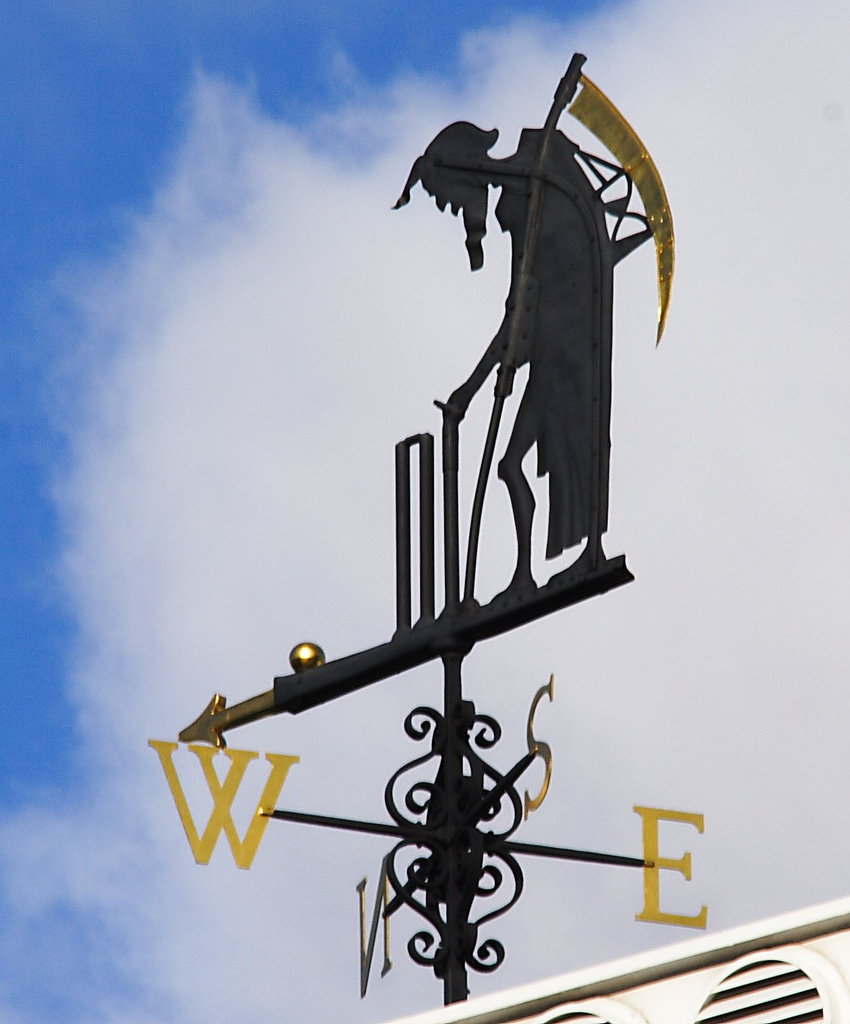
- Interactive map of Father Time
- Location: Lord's Cricket Ground, London
- Coordinates: 51.52878°N 0.17219°W
- Type: Weathervane
- Height: 6 ft 6 in (1.98 m)
- Completion date: 1926

Father Time is a weathervane at Lord's Cricket Ground, London, in the shape of Father Time removing the bails from a wicket. The full weathervane is 6 ft 6 in (1.98 m) tall, with the figure of Father Time standing at 5 ft 4 in (1.63 m). It was given to Lord's in 1926 by the architect of the Grand Stand, Sir Herbert Baker. The symbolism of the figure derives from Law 12(3) of the Laws of Cricket: "After the call of Time, the bails shall be removed from both wickets." The weathervane is frequently referred to as Old Father Time in television and radio broadcasts, but "Old" is not part of its official title.

Father Time was originally located atop the old Grand Stand. It was wrenched from its position during the Blitz, when it became entangled in the steel cable of a barrage balloon, but was repaired and returned to its previous place. In 1992 it was struck by lightning, and the subsequent repairs were featured on the children's television programme Blue Peter.

Father Time was permanently relocated to a structure between the Mound Stand and the Tavern Stand in 1996, when the Grand Stand was demolished and rebuilt. It was again damaged in March 2015 by the high winds of Cyclone Niklas, which necessitated extensive repair by specialists.

In 1969 Father Time became the subject of a poem, "Lord's Test", by the Sussex and England cricketer John Snow.
