= Richard Kerbaj =

Australian filmmaker

Richard Kerbaj is an espionage historian, BAFTA-winning and twice Emmy-nominated filmmaker, known for specializing in research on intelligence agencies and national security. Kerbaj's analysis and findings have featured in leading international news outlets, including The New York Times, The Wall Street Journal, The Economist, The Washington Post, The Times, and The Guardian; on television platforms, including the BBC, ITV, Amazon, and HBO; and on podcasts, including The Rest Is History and The Rest Is Classified

His debut book, The Secret History of the Five Eyes, received global acclaim. His second book, The Defector, was published in Britain in September 2025 to widespread praise, with a US edition scheduled for September 2026.

Richard is currently working on his third espionage history, and developing a television drama inspired by his first book with Hollywood actor and producer Jamie Lee Curtis.

== Life ==
Born in Melbourne, Australia to parents of Druze origin, Kerbaj's family moved to a village in Lebanon in 1980 when he was 2 years old. They became trapped by the country's escalating civil war.

His family returned to Melbourne and lived in Toorak where they ran a milk bar. During Kerbaj's final year of high school his English grades improved dramatically with help from tutor and friend Ben Sheehan. In March 2001, Kerbaj started a writing course at Deakin University, where he studied under influential Australian author, journalist and photographer Peter Davis. Kerbaj's first newspaper article was an August 2001 profile of host of Barry Bissell, the host of radio show Take 40 Australia, which was published in The Age.

Kerbaj initially worked as a freelancer before he started working for The Australian newspaper in 2005.

In 2006 Kerbaj published an article on Sheikh Taj Din al-Hilali which won the John Curtin Prize for Journalism and a Young Journalist of the Year award at News Limited which gave him the opportunity to work at a News Limited publication in London for three months.

In 2018 Kerbaj shared the "Scoop of the Year" award with Tom Harper and Jon Ungoed-Thomas at the British Press Awards for their reporting on pornography found on the computer of Damian Green.

== Producer ==
- My Son the Jihadi, a BAFTA winning documentary about the mother of Thomas Evans, an Al Shabaab militant who was killed in 2015.
- Hunting the KGB Killers, a documentary about the poisoning of Alexander Litvinenko.

== Books ==
- Kerbaj, Richard (2022). The secret history of the Five Eyes: the untold story of the international spy network. London. ISBN 978-1-78946-503-7. OCLC 1338655960.
