= List of British Press Awards Scoops of the Year =

The Scoop of the Year award is one of the honours given annually by the British Press Awards.

Year	Newspaper	Scoop	Notes
2026	Daily Mail	"Secret Afghan Airlift"	Associated award: The story was also shortlisted for Investigation of the Year.
2025	The Sun	"Huw Edwards Charged With Indecent Images"	
2024	Financial Times	"How Crispin Odey Evaded Sexual Assault Allegations for Decades"	Associated award: FT Weekend Magazine, in which the piece ran, won "Supplement of the Year".
2023	The Sun	"[Matt] Hancock's affair with aide"	Associated award: The initial story was the focus of the "Front Page of the Year - Tabloid".
2020	Daily Mirror and The Guardian (joint winners)	Dominic Cummings breaking Covid-19 lockdown rules	Associated award: Pippa Crerar of the Mirror won "Political Reporter of the Year".
2019	The Daily Telegraph	"Sir Philip Green and Britain’s #MeToo scandal"	Associated awards: reporter Claire Newell was joint recipient of "News Reporter of the Year", and the story was the focus of the "Front Page of the Year".
2018	The Times	"Oxfam staff paid Haiti survivors for sex"	Associated award: reporter Sean O'Neill won "News Reporter of the Year".
2017	The Sunday Times	"Police: We found porn on deputy PM’s computers" as part of the 2017 Westminster sexual misconduct allegations.	Won by Tom Harper, Jon Ungoed-Thomas and Richard Kerbaj.
2011	News of the World	Pakistan cricket spot-fixing controversy	Associated award: reporter Mazher Mahmood won "News Reporter of the Year"; Nominees: David Laws expenses scandal, The Daily Telegraph; Vince Cable undercover sting, comments, The Daily Telegraph; WikiLeaks revelations (Afghan War files, United States diplomatic cables leak), The Guardian; phone hacking scandal, The Guardian; FIFA World Cup corruption scandal, The Sunday Times; Wayne Rooney vice allegations, Sunday Mirror; "secret life of Jon Venables", Daily Mirror.
2010	The Daily Telegraph	United Kingdom Parliamentary expenses scandal	Associated awards: The Daily Telegraph was named the "National Newspaper of the Year" for its coverage of the scandal, with William Lewis winning "Journalist of the Year" for his role.
2009	The Mail on Sunday	Russell Brand Show prank telephone calls row	Reporter: Miles Goslett
2008	The Sun	190th Fighter Squadron, Blues and Royals friendly fire incident	Associated awards: "Reporter of the Year", for reporter Tom Newton Dunn
2007	Daily Mirror	John Prescott affair with his diary secretary	Reporter: Stephen Moyes
2006	Daily Mirror	"Cocaine Kate" (Kate Moss)	Reporter: Stephen Moyes
2005	News of the World	"Beckham's secret affair"	Story: David Beckham affair with Rebecca Loos
2004	Daily Mirror	'Intruder at the Palace'	Associated award: reporter Ryan Parry awarded the "Hugh Cudlipp award" for outstanding tabloid journalism
2003	Daily Mirror	'Sven and Ulrika'	Story: Sven-Göran Eriksson affair with Ulrika Jonsson
2002	The Sun	'Baby traders'	Reporter: Briony Warden. Story: "how Alan and Judith Kilshaw adopted twins over the internet"
2001	The Independent on Sunday	'GM crops'	Reporter: Geoffrey Lean. Story: "ministers had secretly sanctioned trials of GM crops".
2000	News of the World	"Archer quits"	Story: withdrawal of Jeffrey Archer from the London mayoral election of 2000 over allegations of perjury in a 1987 libel trial
1994	Grimsby Telegraph	Resignation of Norman Lamont	As told to the newspaper by the mother of the then Chancellor of the Exchequer
