= Ian Peebles =

British cricketer

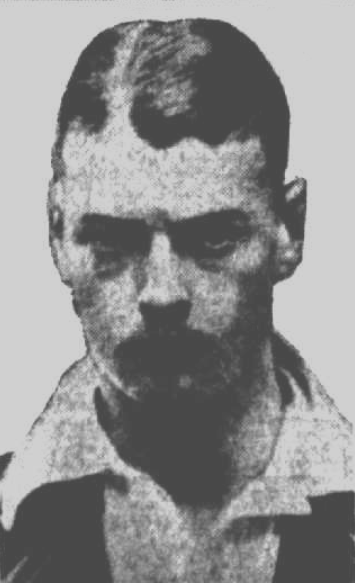

Personal information
- Born: 20 January 1908; Aberdeen, Scotland
- Died: 28 February 1980 (aged 72); Speen, Buckinghamshire, England
- Batting: Right-handed
- Bowling: Legbreak, googly

International information
- National side: England
- Test debut: 24 December 1927 v South Africa
- Last Test: 15 August 1931 v New Zealand

Career statistics
Competition	Tests	First-class
Matches	13	251
Runs scored	98	2,213
Batting average	10.88	9.66
100s/50s	0/0	0/2
Top score	26	58
Balls bowled	2,882	42,937
Wickets	45	923
Bowling average	30.91	21.38
5 wickets in innings	3	62
10 wickets in match	0	15
Best bowling	6/63	8/24
Catches/stumpings	5/–	172/–
- Source: Cricinfo, 17 December 2018

Ian Alexander Ross Peebles (20 January 1908 – 28 February 1980) was a cricketer who played for Oxford University, Middlesex, Scotland and England. After retiring from cricket he became a cricket writer, working as a journalist on The Sunday Times and as the author of many books on cricket.

== Life and career ==
Peebles had one of the strangest introductions to first-class cricket of any player. He was born in Aberdeen and came south to London as a teenager to take up a post as secretary to the cricket school run by the former South African Test player Aubrey Faulkner. He so impressed Faulkner and other observers, including Sir Pelham Warner, with his leg break and googly bowling that, when the amateurs were short of a team to play in the annual Gentlemen v Players match at The Oval, Peebles was invited to make up the numbers. He took just one wicket in that game and scored only a few runs, and was not notably more successful in end-of-season festival matches at Scarborough and Folkestone. But he was then picked, ostensibly as "secretary to the captain" for the 1927–28 MCC tour to South Africa, where he played in the first four Tests.

In 1928, Peebles played his first county matches for Middlesex and the following year, as a regular in the team, he took 120 wickets at less than 20 runs per wicket. He was at Oxford for only one season, 1930, but took 70 wickets for the university, including 13 in the Varsity match against Cambridge.

This form brought him into the England Test team for the fourth Test against Australia at Old Trafford in July 1930, where he discomfited the top Australian batsmen. Bill Woodfull left a ball that passed over the middle stump; the great Donald Bradman was all but bowled by Peebles first ball, was then dropped in the slips and was finally caught for 14; and Peebles' first three balls to Alan Kippax all produced appeals for leg before wicket. Reports of the match suggested Peebles could be the match-winner England had sought against the batsmanship of Bradman and his colleagues – Bradman wrote of Peebles a few months later:

When I got to the crease I found Peebles bowling extraordinarily well, and ... I may as well admit that for the first time in my life I was unable to detect a bowler's leg break from his "bosey" (googly). I watched Peebles as closely as I knew how, but there was no use. Neither by watching his hand nor the ball could I detect it, and definitely this day his bowling was too good for me. I had a most unhappy time!

But the success was relative: in the final Test of the summer at The Oval, Peebles bowled 71 overs and took six wickets for 204 but that was in the context of an Australian total of 695. He was picked as a Wisden Cricketer of the Year in 1931.

After the 1930 cricket season, having to choose between staying at Oxford, where he had done little study, and touring South Africa again in 1930–31, he left Oxford. He returned successfully to South Africa with the MCC, then played regularly against New Zealand in 1931. But under the strain of constant bowling, his leg break became less effective. He was picked for the final Test against Australia in 1934, but had to decline the invitation because of injury.

Across the 1930s, Peebles was an enthusiastic member of amateur tours to far-flung places, but he played only intermittently for Middlesex until 1939, when he reappeared full-time to captain the side. By then he was bowling less, and he took only 49 wickets in the season, but Middlesex had a successful season, finishing second in the County Championship. He lost an eye during an air raid in the Second World War, and was less effective in the matches he played from 1946 to 1948.

Peebles worked for Ladbrokes in the 1930s and was later a director of the company until the 1960s. A noted bon viveur and raconteur, after the Second World War he worked in the wine trade in the company he helped found, Walter S. Siegel Ltd, from 1946 until he retired in 1974. At the same time he also worked as a cricket writer and journalist. He played golf at Harewood Downs Golf Club in Buckinghamshire.

== Books by Ian Peebles ==
His obituary notice in the 1981 edition of Wisden said: "For any student of cricket history over the last 60 years, his many books are compulsory and delightful reading."

- How to Bowl (1934)
- Talking of Cricket (1953)
- Ian Peebles on the Ashes 1954-55 (1955)
- Batter's Castle: A Ramble Round the Realm of Cricket (1958)
- The Fight for the Ashes 1958-59: The English Tour in Australia and New Zealand (1959)
- Bowler's Turn: A Further Ramble Round the Realms of Cricket (1960)
- The Watney Book of Test Match Grounds (1967)
- Straight from the Shoulder: "Throwing" – Its History and Cure (1968)
- Woolley: The Pride of Kent (1969)
- "Patsy" Hendren: The Cricketer and His Times (1969)
- Denis Compton: The Generous Cricketer (1971)
- Lord's 1946–1970 (1971) (with Diana Rait Kerr)
- Spinner's Yarn (1977)
- Lord's: The Official Pictorial Souvenir (1979)

== See also ==
- List of Test cricketers born in non-Test playing nations

Sporting positions
Preceded by Walter Robins	Middlesex County Cricket Captain; 1939	Succeeded by (no cricket 1940–45); Walter Robins
