= Diana Rait Kerr =

English curator

Diana Rait Kerr (11 August 1918 – 18 December 2012) was an English curator, cricket writer and cricket historian. She was the first full-time curator of the Marylebone Cricket Club (MCC) and one of the first women to be an elected honorary member of the MCC.

== Early life ==
Born in Dublin, Rait Kerr attended Perse High School, Cambridge, and Stoatley Hall, Haslemere. Her father, Rowan Rait Kerr, was Secretary (i.e. chief executive) of the MCC from 1936 to 1952. At the outbreak of World War II, she was 21 years old; she spent the war driving ambulances in London during the Blitz and in Cambridge and Cardiff.

== Career ==
As part of her father's effort to restore Lord’s Cricket Ground after its occupation by the Royal Air Force during the war, Rait Kerr helped him to sort and catalogue the ground’s records and artefacts. Rait Kerr became the MCC's curator, and held the position from 1945 to her retirement in 1968. She was the first person to hold the position as a permanent full-time role, as previous staff had been either part-time or volunteers. During her tenure, she organised much of the MCC’s collection of artefacts and documents into a museum, housed in the club’s converted racquets court.

In 1999, when MCC ended its 212-year policy of only admitting men to membership, Rait Kerr was one of the first women members.

== Retirement ==
Rait Kerr spent much of her retirement travelling. Based in a cottage at Little Gaddesden, near Berkhamsted, she would travel abroad to watch Test matches, often on tours organised by The Cricketer magazine.

== Bibliography ==
- Hambledon Cricket and the Bat and Ball Inn, Henty & Constable (Brewers), 1951.
- Lord's 1946-1970, with Ian Peebles, Pavilion Books, 1987, ISBN 978-1851451418.
