= The Press Awards =

Award for the best of British journalism

The Press Awards, formerly the British Press Awards, is an annual ceremony that celebrates the best of British journalism.

== History ==
Established in 1962 by The People and World's Press News, the first award ceremony for the then-named Hannen Swaffer Awards, named after journalist Hannen Swaffer, was held in 1963. It was judged by a small panel of senior figures in journalism and awarded just three awards. Following an earlier consolidation of companies into the International Publishing Corporation, the 1966 awards were restyled the International Publishing Corporation Hannen Swaffer Awards and the number of awards issued had increased to ten. The 1975 awards saw the name change to the British Press Awards.

After having been run by the Press Gazette for more than 20 years, in 2010 the awards were taken over by the Society of Editors. Although often still referred to as the "British Press Awards", after the take-over the name was changed for the 2010 awards to The Press Awards. In the 2014 awards, there were 31 categories, and the number of judges had increased dramatically from the awards' first days.

In 2012, following the takeover by the Society of Editors and the name change to The Press Awards, the naming format of the awards changed. Previously, the awards were named for the year in which they were issued; subsequently, they were named for the previous year (i.e. that which was under consideration), although they are often reported on using the old naming format.

In 2022, the awards were produced by Haymarket Media Group on behalf of the News Media Association.

== Categories ==
The categories change from year to year, some previous categories have included:

=== 2007 ===
Newspaper of the Year, Reporter of the Year, Business Journalist of the Year, Financial Journalist of the Year, Young Journalist of the Year, Photographer of the Year, Sports Photographer of the Year, Foreign Reporter of the Year, Columnist of the Year, Feature Writer of the Year, Critic of the Year, Front Page of the Year, Sports Reporter of the Year, Sports Writer of the Year, Sports Journalist of the Year, Team of the Year, Interviewer of the Year, Supplement of the Year, Scoop of the Year, Cartoonist of the Year, Specialist Writer of the Year, Political Journalist of the Year, and Showbusiness Writer of the Year.

=== 2013 ===
Business Finance and Economics Journalist of the Year, Breaking News Award, Campaign of the Year, Foreign Affairs Journalist of the Year, Investigation of the Year, New Journalist of the Year, Photojournalist of the Year, Politics Journalist of the Year, Journalism Innovation of the Year, Sports Journalist of the Year, and Science and Technology Journalist of the Year.

=== 2022 – Complete list of categories ===
Business and Finance Journalist of the Year, Campaign of the Year, Cartoonist of the Year, Columnist of the Year, Critic of the Year, Environment Journalist of the Year, Excellence in Diversity Award, Feature Writer of the Year, Foreign Reporter of the Year, Front Page of the Year, Health Journalist of the Year, Interviewer of the Year, Investigation of the Year, News Podcast of the Year, News Website of the Year, Newspaper of the Year, Photographer of the Year, Political Journalist of the Year, Science and Technology Journalist of the Year, Scoop of the Year, Specialist journalist of the Year, Supplement of the Year, The Hugh McIlvanney Award for Sports Journalist of the Year, Travel Journalist of the Year, and Young Journalist of the Year.

== National Newspaper of the Year ==
- 1993 – The Daily Telegraph
- 1994 – Daily Mail
- 1995 – Daily Mail
- 1996 – The Daily Telegraph
- 1997 – Daily Mail
- 1998 – The Guardian
- 1999 – The Sunday Telegraph
- 2000 – Daily Mail
- 2001 – Daily Mirror
- 2002 – Daily Mail
- 2003 – The Independent
- 2004 – News of the World
- 2005 – The Guardian
- 2006 – The Observer (see British Press Awards 2006)
- 2007 – Financial Times
- 2008 – The Times
- 2009 – The Daily Telegraph
- 2010 – The Guardian
- 2011 – Daily Mail
- 2012 – The Times
- 2013 – The Guardian
- 2014 – The Times
- 2015 – The Mail on Sunday
- 2016 – Daily Mail
- 2017 – Financial Times
- 2018 – The Times
- 2019 – Daily Mail
- 2020 – Daily Mail
- 2023 – The Guardian

== See also ==
- Press Gazette
- Scottish Press Awards
- List of British Press Awards Scoops of the Year
- List of British journalism awards
