= Lawrence Booth (cricket writer) =

British cricket writer

Lawrence Booth (born 2 April 1975 at Oxford) is a British sports journalist, author, cricket correspondent of the Daily Mail, and editor of Wisden Cricketers' Almanack since 2012.

== Career ==
Booth was educated at Magdalen College School, Oxford, before going up to Sidney Sussex College, Cambridge, where he read Modern Languages. Booth became the youngest Wisden editor for 72 years upon his appointment in 2012. He had previously written for The Guardian, The Observer and The Sunday Times, and is still a regular contributor to Wisden Cricket Monthly magazine. He wrote "The Spin" column at The Guardian for seven years, and his "Top Spin" column for MailOnline was named "Online Column of the Year" at the 2010 Sports Journalists' Association awards. In March 2013, he won Scoop of the Year at the SJAs after revealing that Kevin Pietersen had sent text messages to the touring South Africans the previous summer.

Booth has written, edited or co-written 20 books, including Arm-Ball to Zooter, Cricket, Lovely Cricket?, Bazball - which in 2024 was shortlisted for the MCC/Cricket Society Book of the Year award, as well as by the Sports Book Awards and the Cricket Writers' Club - and the last 15 editions of Wisden, including the 150th, published in 2013.

== See also ==
- Wisden

Media offices
Preceded by Scyld Berry	Editor of Wisden Cricketers' Almanack; 2012–present	Incumbent
