= Thorndyke (TV series) =

British television series

- Genre: Crime drama
- Based on: Dr. Thorndyke by R. Austin Freeman
- Written by: Allan Prior; C.E. Webber; Robert Banks Stewart
- Starring: Peter Copley; Paul Williamson; Patrick Newell
- Composer: Albert Elms
- Country of origin: United Kingdom
- Original language: English
- No. of series: 1
- No. of episodes: 6

Production
- Producer: John Robins
- Running time: 50 minutes

Original release
- Network: BBC 1
- Release: 3 October – 7 November 1964

Thorndyke is a 1964 crime television series that originally aired on BBC 1 in six episodes from 3 October to 7 November 1964, following on from a pilot broadcast on 6 July as part of the Detective anthology series. It is based on the novels and short stories by R. Austin Freeman featuring the detective Doctor Thorndyke, a pioneer in using forensic methods to solve cases.

All six episodes presumably still exist, but except for "The Case of Oscar Brodski" (available on YouTube), they have not been made available to the public.

== Cast ==
=== Main ===
- Peter Copley as Doctor John Evelyn Thorndyke
- Paul Williamson as Doctor Jervis
- Patrick Newell as Polton
- Glyn Owen as Superintendent Morton

=== Other ===
Actors who appeared in individual episodes of the series include:

- George A. Cooper as Pratt
- Ronald Leigh-Hunt as John Simpson
- Jack May as Percival Bland
- Stephanie Bidmead as Kathy
- Kenneth Colley as Ellis
- Jane Downs as Mrs Crofton
- John Le Mesurier as Pembury
- Anthony Sagar as Ellis
- Royston Tickner as Smith
- Patrick Troughton as Frank Belfield
- Rex Rashley as Amos Caldwell
- Harry Towb as Ambrose
- Wanda Ventham as Maud
- Peter Madden as DS Martin
- Kevin Brennan Sergeant
- David Nettheim as Stalker
- Lennard Pearce as Shenston
- Donald Bisset as Sergeant Hawkins
- Hilda Fenemore as Mrs Brattle
- Ivor Salter as Stanton
- Edwin Brown as Brattle
- Vernon Dobtcheff as Coroner
- Aubrey Morris as Julius Wicks
- John Frawley as Croupier

== Bibliography ==
- Adam, Alison. A History of Forensic Science: British beginnings in the twentieth century. Routledge, 2015.
- Perry, Christopher. The British Television Pilot Episodes Research Guide 1936-2015. 2015.
- Weissmann, Elke. Transnational Television Drama: Special Relations and Mutual Influence Between the US and UK. Palgrave Macmillan, 2012.
