= Shafta Awards =

SHAFTA Awards or Shafta Awards can mean:

- Shafta Awards (journalism), annual awards for journalism
- SHAFTA Awards (adult video), annual awards for adult film making
