= David Pratt (Scottish journalist) =

Scottish journalist

- Born: Hamilton, South Lanarkshire
- Education: Glasgow School of Art
- Occupations: Journalist & Photographer
- Known for: War reporting
- Notable work: Intifada – The Long Day of Rage (2007 book); Pictures from Iraq (2022 film)

David Pratt is a Scottish journalist, documentary filmmaker, photographer, and author who has won Scottish Press awards as Scottish Journalist of the Year, Reporter of the Year, and Feature Writer of the Year.

As well as being a war reporter his photography has featured in his 2020 documentary Pictures from Afghanistan and 2022 documentary Pictures from Iraq. He is the author of Intifada – The Long Day of Rage (2006).

== Early life and education ==
Pratt grew up in a working-class family in the Hillhouse scheme near Hamilton alongside his brother Ken. As a teenager he was a keen mountaineer.

He has an honours arts degree from the Glasgow School of Art.

== Career ==
After graduation, Pratt briefly taught art and design history before moving to journalism. Pratt has reported on wars in Afghanistan, Bosnia, Cambodia, the Democratic Republic of the Congo, and Haiti; he has reported on the Iranian revolution, Iraq, Libya, the Nicaraguan revolution, and events in Gaza, Russia, Somalia, Sudan, and Syria. He was a staff reporter for The Herald, but has also contributed to Agence France Presse, Al-Jazeera, the BBC, Channel 4 News, The National, The New York Times, Reuters, Svenska Dagbladet, The Daily Telegraph, The Independent, Sunday National, and The Sunday Times.

In 2019, his war photography appeared in an exhibition Only With the Heart.

His work was featured in the 2020 documentary Pictures from Afghanistan and the 2022 documentary Pictures from Iraq that he co-directed with Robbie Fraser. Pratt is the presenter of Pictures from The Balkans, directed by Fraser and broadcast on the BBC in 2022 and 2023. In Pictures from The Balkans, Pratt revisits locations he filmed in during the Yugoslav Wars travelling along the Danube River near Vukovar, Croatia. Pratt also features in the 2023 BBC Scotland two-part documentary Pictures from Ukraine. Also produced by Robbie Fraser, Pictures from Ukraine documents Pratt's 2022 journey from Poland to Mykolaiv via Kyiv and Lviv, during the Russo-Ukrainian war. In 2022, Pratt held a photography exhibition Sogo Community Arts Hub on the Saltmarket, also called Pictures from Ukraine.

== Intifada – The Long Day of Rage ==
David Pratt
- Language: English
- Subject: Palestinian Intifadas
- Genre: Non-fiction
- Published: 2006
- Publisher: Sunday Herald Books
- Publication place: Scotland
- Pages: 304
- ISBN: 9781932033632

In his 2006 book Intifada – The Long Day of Rage, Pratt documented violence between Palestinians and Israelis in Gaza and the West Bank between 2000 and 2001.

=== Content ===
Pratt documents the formulaic way that violence is dispensed in Palestine by Palestinian youth and Israeli Defense Forces during the 2000 and 2001 Palestinian uprisings, or Intifadas.

In the foreword, Pratt is open about his struggle to remain impartial and while he notes that both sides see themselves as victims, he is critical of the State of Israel from the start and states his conviction that the Palestinian people remain the victims of "a great injustice". Pratt states: “This book makes no pretence towards impartiality…because the weight of evidence which as a reporter I have come across over considerable time, convinces me that the State of Israel has a case to answer for in its appalling treatment of the Palestinian people.” However, the book does present the Intifadas from both perspectives and includes reporting on writing about the Intifadas by Israeli writers A.B. Yehoshua, David Grossman, and Amos Oz.

The book includes criticism of the Palestine Liberation Organization (PLO) and the Palestinian Authority. It discusses the complicity between the PLO and the state of Israel and their collective failure to deal with the revolutionary events. The criticism of Yasser Arafat is strong. The book presents the Oslo Accords as insincere agreements and the second Intifada as counterproductive, linking it to both the election of Ariel Sharon and the rise of Islamism in Palestine, which it describes as being supported by Israel.

=== Critical reception ===
The book is described by Jason Burke as highly readable; he describes the narrative as "accessible, colorful and informed". Philip Connolly, writing in An Phoblacht, praises Pratt for his straight talking and for avoiding political hyperbole.

== Bibliography ==
- David Pratt, 2007, Intifada – The Long Day of Rage, ISBN 978-1-932033-63-2

== Awards ==
- Amnesty International Media Awards for human rights reporting, four times finalist
- Journalist of the Year, Scottish Press Awards, 2019
- Reporter of the Year, Scottish Press Awards, twice
- Feature Writer of the Year, Scottish Press Awards, twice
