= Sigma Delta Chi Award =

Annual award for excellence in journalism

The Sigma Delta Chi Awards are presented annually by the Society of Professional Journalists (SPJ) (formerly Sigma Delta Chi) for excellence in journalism. The SPJ states the purpose of the award is to promote "the free flow of information vital to a well-informed citizenry".

== History ==
The awards program began in 1939. The SPJ first awarded the Distinguished Service Awards. These awards later became the Sigma Delta Chi Awards. Prior to the creation of the awards program, the society first chose six individuals for their contributions to journalism in 1932.

== Entry requirements ==
A fee is collected from each entry. Since 2007, the fee for members of the Society of Professional Journalists was $60, $100 for non-members. All entries must be accompanied by three copies of the entry form.

In addition each entry must include a cover letter that includes a summary of the story or stories, a discussion of the major findings and results, a review of the process followed to get the story and an account of the difficulty or uniqueness of effort in obtaining the story.

The 2012 contest judged more than 1,700 entries.

== Judging criteria ==
Materials are judged by a panel of distinguished, veteran journalists. For each category one award is issued and judges may withhold an award if they deem no entry worthy.

Entries are judged on readability, effectiveness of interpretation, accuracy and completeness, enterprise, clarity and style, resourcefulness of the reporter in overcoming obstacles, interest and adherence to the SPJ Code of Ethics.

== Award categories ==
The 48 categories are assigned according to publication type or the type of work in journalism. There are awards for newspapers and wire services, magazines, arts and graphics, radio, television, newsletters, research and online reporting.

== See also ==
- Society of Professionale Journalists
- List of journalism awards
- List of American journalism awards
- List of British journalism awards
- List of sports journalism awards
- Pulitzer prize
