= List of British journalism awards =

This list of British journalism awards is an index to articles about notable awards given to journalism in the United Kingdom.

== Awards ==
Award	Sponsor	Awarded for	Period
Aerospace Journalist of the Year Awards	World Leadership Forum	Writers and broadcasters working in the aerospace and aviation field	1996 to 2009
Amnesty International UK Media Awards	Amnesty International	Best human rights journalism in the UK.	Since 1992
Andrew Cross Award	Churches' Media Council	Best in journalistic reporting and analysis of religious news and current affairs in radio, television, in print media and online	Until 2006
Bevins Prize	Bevins Trust	Outstanding investigative journalism	Since 2008
British Sports Journalism Awards	Sports Journalists' Association	Best of sports journalism	Since 1976
Business Journalist of the Year Awards	World Leadership Forum	Journalists of all nationalities, and the entire spectrum of business and financial reporting	1999–2008
Nick Clarke Award	BBC	Celebrate and recognise the best broadcast interview of the year	Since 2008
Foreign Reporter of the Year	The Press Awards	(various categories)	Since 1962
George Orwell Memorial Prize	Penguin Group	Articles or essays on current political, cultural or social issues	1976–1986
Guardian Student Media Award	The Guardian	Student journalism (various categories)	Since 1978
Hatchet Job of the Year	The Omnivore (website)	Writer of the angriest, funniest, most trenchant book review of the past twelve months.	2012–2014
Komla Dumor Award	BBC	Outstanding individual living and working in Africa, who combines strong journalism skills, on air flair, and an exceptional talent in telling African stories	Since 2015
Magazine Design and Journalism Awards	Press Gazette	Design and journalism across all magazine sectors – consumer, B2B and customer	Since 1998
The Maggies, Magazine Cover Awards	iSUBSCRiBE	Covers that resonate most strongly with the general public, encapsulate the passion of the subject matter, capture the spirit of the previous year and provoke the most debate	Since 2009
Martha Gellhorn Prize for Journalism	Martha Gellhorn Trust	Human story that penetrates the established version of events and illuminates an urgent issue buried by prevailing fashions of what makes news	Since 1999
National Student Journalism Awards	National Union of Students (United Kingdom)	Student articles	Since 1947
Orwell Prize	The Orwell Foundation, University College London	Political journalism	Since 1994
Paul Foot Award	Private Eye	Investigative or campaigning journalism	Since 2005
Rory Peck Awards	Rory Peck Trust	Freelance cameramen and camerawomen, news and current affairs	Since 1998
Scottish Press Awards	Scottish Newspaper Society	Talent in Scottish journalism	Since 1979
Shafta Awards (journalism)		The very worst in tabloid journalism	Since 1987
British Sports Journalism Awards	Sports Journalists' Association	Commemorating of all sports writers	
The Press Awards	Society of Editors	Best of British journalism	Since 1962

== See also ==
- Lists of awards
- List of journalism awards
