= Falkirk Herald =

Scottish newspaper

The Falkirk Herald
- Type: Weekly newspaper
- Format: Tabloid
- Owner: National World
- Editor: Jill Buchanan
- Founded: 1845
- Headquarters: Gateway Business Park, Beancross Road, Grangemouth (Scotland)
- Circulation: 5,501 (as of 2024)
- ISSN: 0963-2034
- Website: falkirkherald.co.uk

The Falkirk Herald is a weekly newspaper and daily news website published by National World. It provides reportage, opinion and analysis of news, current affairs and sport in the towns of Falkirk, Camelon, Grangemouth, Larbert, Stenhousemuir and Denny as well as the neighbouring villages of Polmont, Redding, Brightons, Banknock and Bonnybridge. Its circulation area has a total population of 151,600, the fifth largest urban area in Scotland. It was named Weekly Newspaper of the Year at the 2013 Scottish Press Awards.

== Early years ==
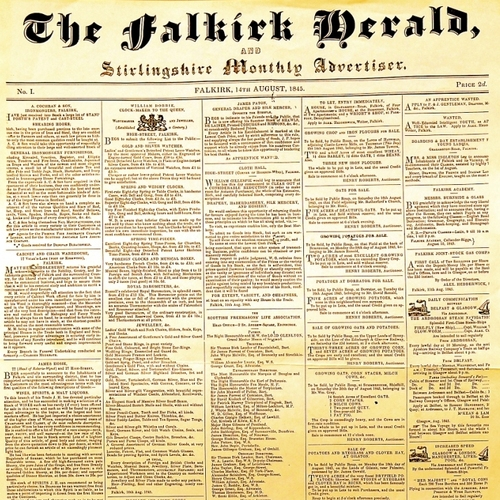
The front page of the first edition of The Falkirk Herald, published on 14 August 1845

The Falkirk Herald and Stirlingshire Monthly Advertiser was established by Alexander Hedderwick, a Glasgow-based lawyer. The first edition went on sale on Saturday, 14 August 1845.

Less than a year later the fledgling title was sold to Archibald Johnston, whose grandfather had first established a printing business in 1763. Johnston moved production of the Herald to Falkirk, and the first edition to be printed in the town went on sale on 13 August 1846. The Herald was the first newspaper purchased by the Johnston family, and the title's increasing size and influence would play a crucial part in growing the company which would become the present day Johnston Press publishing empire.

The Falkirk Herald switched from monthly to weekly publication in 1851 and its first full-time editor, Mr J. Finlay, was appointed on the recommendation of Alexander Russell, editor of The Scotsman.

During its first decade of publication the newspaper campaigned vigorously for Falkirk to be granted municipal burgh status. This would allow for the creation of a modern council to replace the medieval system of 'stentmasters' who had controlled local affairs for centuries and were widely viewed as incompetent. Burgh status would also mean the town could raise money needed to fund urban improvements, such as water supply and roadworks. A parliamentary bill enshrining these changes in law was eventually passed in 1859.

Following the death of Archibald Johnston in 1877, control of the paper passed to his fourth son James, and eventually to Frederick, his youngest son, in 1882. Frederick Johnston was to remain as publisher of The Falkirk Herald for 53 years. Under his leadership, circulation of the Herald grew from around 7000 to 15,000 a week as public literacy rates improved and the demand for reading materials increased.

In 1891, Johnston established the Linlithgow Gazette to serve the neighbouring county of Linlithgowshire.

The author Neil Munro worked briefly as a journalist for the paper in 1890.

The newspaper's staff moved into a purpose-built two-storey office in Falkirk High Street in 1909.

== Charity appeals ==
The Falkirk Herald launched several notable appeals in the first decades of the 20th century. A fundraising drive on behalf of Belgian refugees from the First World War earned a formal thank you from the King of Belgium. In the aftermath of the Redding pit disaster in 1923, The Falkirk Herald appealed for its readers to give generously on behalf of the victims. The appeal raised a staggering £63,000 – equivalent to several million pounds today.

In 1940 an appeal was launched to raise money to buy a Spitfire for the RAF. The paper's readership subsequently donated £5,000, which was used to build a plane which was named ‘The Falkirk Bairn’. It took to the skies in 1941, serving with three squadrons before being written off in combat in September 1942.

Following the end of the war in 1945, The Falkirk Herald War Relief fund was launched to help injured soldiers, their families and prisoners of war. It raised £8,100.

== Modern era ==
The masthead was changed to The Falkirk Herald and Scottish Midlands Journal in the early 1920s, reflecting the paper's readership across central Scotland. Publication day was switched to Saturday, with a smaller 'pictorial' edition being produced on Wednesday.

Frederick Mair Johnston became managing director of the Herald's parent company in 1936. Under his leadership, the family firm of F. Johnston & Company grew from publishing two newspapers to a total of 24.

His son, Frederick Patrick Mair Johnston, took over the chairman's role, remaining at the helm until his retirement in 2001. Under his charge, the company made its first English acquisition, the Derbyshire Times. Further acquisitions followed in Yorkshire, Sussex and the Midlands.

Circulation of The Falkirk Herald peaked at 40,000 in 1979, around the time production of the paper was threatened by a printer's strike.

The Falkirk Herald left its office in the High Street in 1982, moving a short distance to Newmarket Street. The former Herald building was a branch of W.H. Smith. Now it is the home of Poundstretcher.

In 1988, the Herald's parent firm F. Johnston & Co. Ltd was renamed Johnston Press and was floated on the Stock Exchange. Johnston Press went on to become the third largest publisher of regional newspapers in the United Kingdom. The FJ&Co cypher can still be seen on the former High Street offices.

The paper celebrated its 150th anniversary on 14 August 1995. Letters of congratulation were received from Her Majesty The Queen and Prime Minister John Major, amongst others.

Production and printing of the newspaper moved to Camelon, a suburb of Falkirk, in 2001. In November 2010, all editorial and advertising staff moved to a new office in Grangemouth. A small office in Manor Street was opened to maintain a presence in Falkirk town centre.

Under the editorship of George Guthrie, The Falkirk Herald was named Weekly Newspaper of the Year in 2000 the Scottish Press Awards and also took the title in 2008, 2009 and 2013 with Colin Hume at the helm.

On 16 November 2018, Johnston Press announced it would place itself into administration after it was unable to find a suitable buyer to refinance its debt. The Falkirk Herald and the other Johnston Press titles were bought by JPIMedia on 17 November 2018 after a pre-packaged deal was agreed with creditors.

== Relaunch ==
It was announced in the edition published on 26 October 2011 that the newspaper would switch to tabloid format the following week. The decision to end the paper's 166 years as a broadsheet was taken following the results of a consultation in which readers were asked to comment on the newspaper and its coverage. The Scottish Midlands Journal section of the masthead was dropped, with the paper now simply titled The Falkirk Herald.

== Digital age ==
The first Falkirk Herald website was set up in 1996 by chief reporter Graeme Smith. It has undergone a series of relaunches in the years since and is now updated on a daily basis with breaking local news and sport, a range of columnists and items first published in the newspaper. It also has active Facebook and Twitter accounts.
