= Pictures from Iraq =

- Directed by: Robbie Fraser and David Pratt
- Cinematography: Robbie Fraser
- Production company: Dulcimer Films
- Release date: 2022
- Country: United Kingdom
- Language: English

Pictures from Iraq is a 2022 documentary by Scottish filmmaker Robbie Fraser and Scottish photojournalist David Pratt that follows Pratt revisiting locations in Iraq that he reported during 1991, and during the 2003 invasion of Iraq.

== Plot summary ==
Pictures from Iraq follows Pratt as he returns to Mosul, Qayyarah, Kirkuk and Erbil in the autonomous Kurdish region.

In the documentary David Pratt meets Major General Sirwan Barzani, women politicians in the Kurdistan Freedom Party, and journalist Urban Hamid.

The documentary jumps between recent footage shot by Robbie Fraser, archival 1991 and 2003 footage of David Pratt in Iraq, and 2003 photography by Pratt. It includes footage of the moment that Abu Bakr al Baghdadi announced the formation of the Islamic State.

== Production ==
Production of the film was funded by Screen Scotland, BBC Persian, BBC Scotland, and Terranoa (Fraser's company). The film is produced and directed by Fraser and Pratt. It is a sequel to Fraser's 2020 documentary Pictures from Afghanistan that also featured Pratt (although he was not a director of that documentary.)

To reduce the number of meetings during the COVID-19 pandemic, the producers filmed Pictures from Iraq and the upcoming Pictures from the Balkans in the same four week window. The style of the production was influenced by Anthony Bourdain: Parts Unknown.

== Release ==
Pictures from Iraq was first screened at the Glasgow Film Festival in March 2022.

== Critical reception ==
The footage is described by The Herald as evocative, and by documentary reviewer Geoffrey Macnab as distressing.

Paul Trainer, writing in Glasgowist, described it as "a fascinating, highly personal journey."
