= Pictures from Afghanistan =

- Directed by: Robbie Fraser
- Produced by: Robbie Fraser (Line Producer: Lorna Jane Ferguson)
- Cinematography: Robbie Fraser
- Edited by: Naomi Spiro
- Music by: Stephen Wright & Nigel Dunn
- Production company: Dulcimer Films
- Release date: 2020
- Running time: 60 minutes
- Country: United Kingdom
- Language: English

Pictures from Afghanistan is a 2020 documentary by Robbie Frazer that follows the work of Scottish journalist and war photographer David Pratt as he revisits the locations in Afghanistan that he reported on in the 1980s Soviet–Afghan War.

The one hour film addresses themes of empathy and humanity.

== Plot summary ==
Pictures from Afghanistan follows David Pratt as he returns to meets the Afghan Mujahedeen that he originally reported on during the 1980's Soviet–Afghan War.

Locations visited include the Russian Centre for Science and Culture, and the Kabul Zoo.

The film includes commentary about the September 11 attacks, and the ongoing heroin addiction in Kabul.

Humanity and empathy are recurring themes in the documentary, and Pratt discusses how he struggles with both while reporting on the war. The narrative from Pratt reminds viewers of the need to humanize Afghans.

== Production ==
Production of the film was funded by Creative Scotland and BBC Scotland and produced by Dulcimer Films.

== Release ==
Pictures from Afghanistan debuted at the Glasgow Film Festival in 2020.

== Critical reception ==
The film was endorsed by journalism professor Eamonn O’Neill on his Talk Media podcast and is praised by Alina Faulds for telling a "love story" about Afghanistan, that she says humanizes a conflict that western observers tend to see through a distant lens.

== See also ==
- Pictures from Iraq (2022 documentary)
