= As a Thief in the Night =

1928 novel

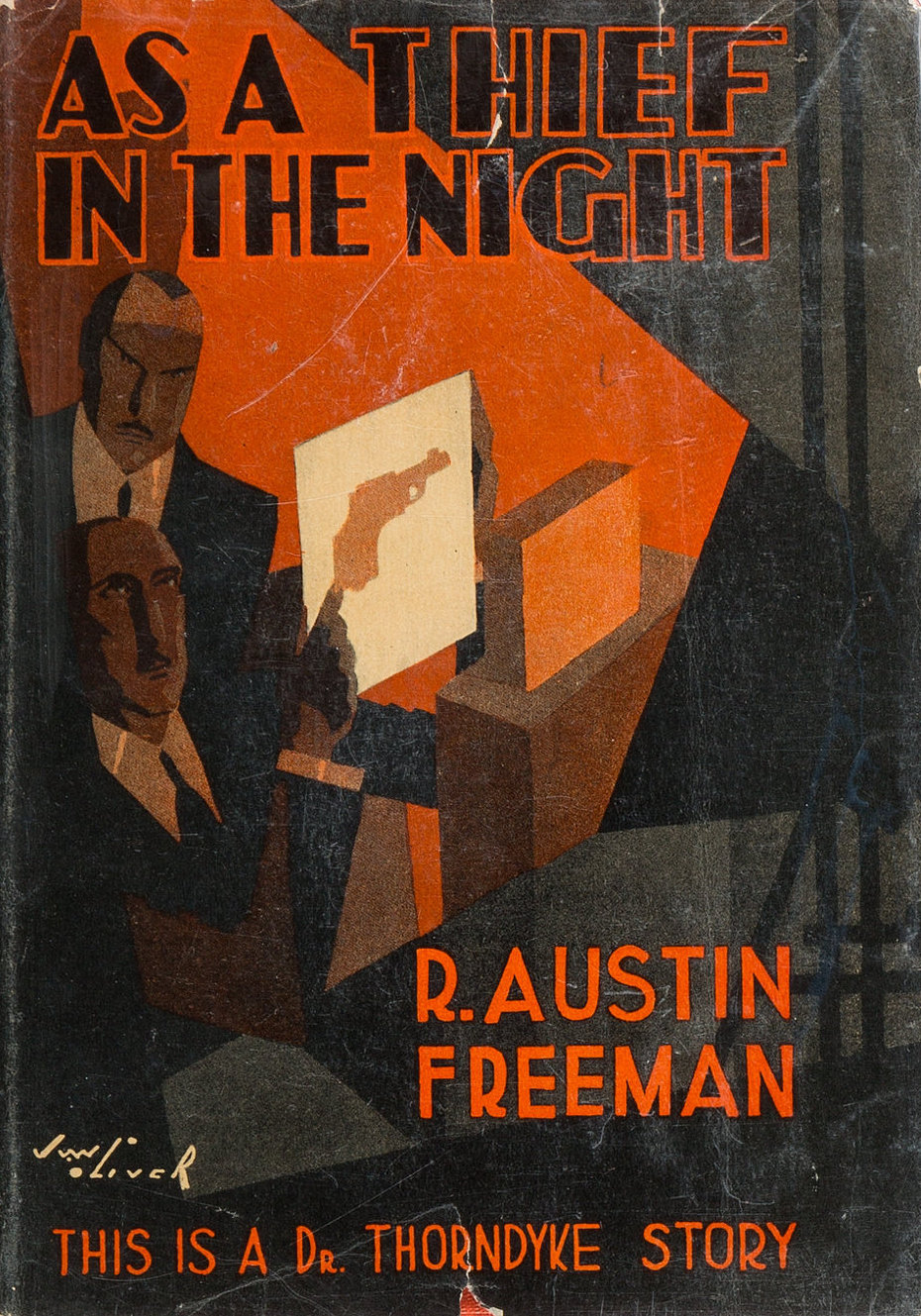
- American first edition
- Author: R. Austin Freeman
- Language: English
- Series: Doctor Thorndyke
- Genre: Detective
- Publisher: Hodder and Stoughton; Dodd, Mead (US)
- Publication date: 1928
- Publication place: United Kingdom
- Media type: Print
- Preceded by: A Certain Dr. Thorndyke
- Followed by: Mr. Pottermack's Oversight

As a Thief in the Night is a 1928 detective novel by the British author R. Austin Freeman. Part of his long-running series of novels featuring the forensic investigator Doctor Thorndyke, it was published in London by Hodder and Stoughton and in New York City by Dodd, Mead.

== Bibliography ==
- Hubin, Allen J. Crime Fiction, 1749-1980: A Comprehensive Bibliography. Garland Publishing, 1984.
- Magill, Frank Northen. Critical Survey of Mystery and Detective Fiction: Authors, Volume 1. Salem Press, 1988.
- Miskimmin, Esme. 100 British Crime Writers. Springer Nature, 2020.
- Parascandola, John. King of Poisons: A History of Arsenic. Potomac Books, 2012.
- Reilly, John M. Twentieth Century Crime & Mystery Writers. Springer, 2015.
