= The Jacob Street Mystery =

1942 novel

- Author: R. Austin Freeman
- Language: English
- Series: Doctor Thorndyke
- Genre: Detective
- Publisher: Hodder and Stoughton; Dodd, Mead (US)
- Publication date: 1942
- Publication place: United Kingdom
- Media type: Print
- Preceded by: Mr. Polton Explains

The Jacob Street Mystery is a 1942 detective novel by the British writer R. Austin Freeman. It was the last in his long-running series of novels featuring the forensic investigator Doctor Thorndyke. It was written during the Second World War in a bomb shelter the author had built in his garden. A member of the Detection Club, it was Freeman's final novel as he died the following year. The Thorndyke series stretched from the Edwardian era to the Golden Age of Detective Fiction It was published in the United States the same year by Dodd, Mead under the alternative title The Unconscious Witness. The first two thirds of the novel is in the third person and largely focuses on Tom Pedley a landscape artist who lives in the fictional mews street of the title near Cumberland Market. The final third is in the first person by Thorndyke's associate Christopher Jervis who follows the unravelling of the mystery. No mention is made of the ongoing war with Nazi Germany.

== Synopsis ==
Tom Pedley an experienced painter is near Hendon painting a seemingly rural scene in woodland about to be developed for housing as part of London's growing suburbs. He unknowingly becomes witness to a murder when he observes three strange figures in the woods shortly before one of them is found dead. He assists the police but their investigations lead to no arrests. At the same time, Pedley's attractive but pushy neighbour Lotta Schiller, an aspiring painter of modern art, intrudes on his bachelor existence.

One afternoon after a visit to Epping Forest she mysteriously disappears. Some clues seem suggest that she has been murdered but Scotland Yard again find the trail running cold. Some time later Thorndyke is called into the case as a legal question has arisen whether she can be proclaimed legally dead as a large inheritance is due to her.

== Bibliography ==
- Herbert, Rosemary. Whodunit?: A Who's Who in Crime & Mystery Writing. Oxford University Press, 2003.
- Hubin, Allen J. Crime Fiction, 1749-1980: A Comprehensive Bibliography. Garland Publishing, 1984.
- Magill, Frank Northen. Critical Survey of Mystery and Detective Fiction: Authors, Volume 1. Salem Press, 1988.
- Reilly, John M. Twentieth Century Crime & Mystery Writers. Springer, 2015.
- Van Dover, J.K. The Detective and the Artist: Painters, Poets and Writers in Crime Fiction, 1840s–1970s. McFarland, 2019.
