= Robbie Fraser =

Scottish film maker

Robbie Fraser is a Scottish film maker. He has made documentaries about the Scottish poet Hamish Henderson, the Scottish mountaineer Hamish MacInnes, and had made two documentaries about the work of Scottish photojournalist David Pratt: Pictures from Afghanistan and Pictures from Iraq.

== Career ==
In 2016, with producer Alasdair MacCuish, Fraser made a documentary about Scottish poet Hamish Henderson. In 2018, he produced Final Ascent: The Legend of Hamish MacInnes, documentary about the misdiagnosis and psychogeriatric detainment of Scottish mountaineer Hamish MacInnes. Fraser learned of MacInnes' memory loss only after filming started.

Fraser founded Dulcimer Films in 2019. In 2020, with funding from BBC Scotland, BBC Persia, Screen Scotland, and Terranoa (French film company), Fraser directed and produced Pictures from Afghanistan about the work of photojournalist David Pratt. In 2022, he co-directed with David Pratt on filming both Pictures from Iraq and the not yet released Pictures from the Balkans.

== Personal life ==
Fraser is based in Glasgow, Scotland.
