= R. Austin Freeman =

British detective story writer (1862-1943)

Richard Austin Freeman
- Born: 11 April 1862; Soho, London, England
- Died: 28 September 1943 (aged 81); Gravesend, Kent, England
- Other name: R. Austin Freeman
- Occupations: Medical Doctor and fiction writer
- Years active: 1887 – 1943
- Known for: His fictional detective, Dr. John Thorndyke
- Notable work: Mr Pottermack's Oversight
- Spouse: Annie Elizabeth Edwards (m. 1887)
- Children: 2

Dr. Richard Austin Freeman MRCS LSA (11 April 1862 – 28 September 1943) was a British writer of detective stories, mostly featuring the medico-legal forensic investigator Dr. Thorndyke. He invented the inverted detective story (a crime fiction in which the commission of the crime is described at the beginning, usually including the identity of the perpetrator, with the story then describing the detective's attempt to solve the mystery). This invention has been described as Freeman's most notable contribution to detective fiction. Freeman used some of his early experiences as a colonial surgeon in his novels. Many of the Dr. Thorndyke stories involve genuine, but sometimes arcane, points of scientific knowledge, from areas such as tropical medicine, metallurgy and toxicology.

== Early life ==
Austin Freeman was the youngest of the five children of tailor Richard Freeman and Ann Maria Dunn. At the age of 18 he entered the medical school of the Middlesex Hospital and qualified MRCS and LSA in 1886. (Note: While some sources state that Freeman trained as an apothecary before studying medicine, this is not correct. Between 1815 and 1999 the Worshipful Society of Apothecaries provided primary medical qualifications, with the title "Licentiate of the Society of Apothecaries" LSA, and such Licentiates were eligible for registration as doctors.)

After qualifying, Freeman spent a year as a house physician at the hospital. He married his childhood sweetheart Annie Elizabeth Edwards in London on 15 April 1887, and the couple later had two sons. He then entered the Colonial Service in 1887 as an assistant surgeon. He served for a time in Keta, Ghana, in 1887 during which time he dealt with an epidemic of black water fever which killed forty per cent of the European population at that port. He had six months of leave (Note: It seems odd that someone who had just entered the service the previous year could get so much leave, but he may have been ill, and had recovery leave.) from mid 1888 and returned to Accra on the Gold Coast just in time to volunteer for the post of medical officer on the planned expedition to Ashanti and Jaman.

Freeman was the doctor, naturalist and surveyor (Note: Freeman was charged with taking astronomical readings to establish the position of the towns they visited as well as geographical features.) for the expedition to Ashanti and Jaman, two independent states in the Gold Coast. The expedition set out from Accra on 8 December 1888, with a band consisting of a band-master and six boys playing two side drums and five fifes, three European officers (the Commissioner, Freeman and the Officer in Charge of the Constables), one Native officer, 100 Hausa constables, a gunners' party with a rocket trough, an apothecary, apothecary's assistant, a hospital orderly, and 200 bearers. The expedition went first to Kumasi (or Coolmassie as it appears in older accounts), the capital of the then independent kingdom of Ashanti. Their second port of call was Bondoukou, Ivory Coast, where they arrived only to find that the king had just signed a protectorate treaty with the French.

However, the expedition was a political failure as the British spokesman blurted out in front of the chiefs that the British were willing to supply a loan of £400 which the king had requested. (Note: The king was new to his throne, and needed to be formally crowned before he could access the treasury, but needed money for the formal coronation. He asked the British for a loan to get around this problem.) However the King had requested this loan with the proviso that it be kept secret from his chiefs. He therefore denied any knowledge of it and the expedition moved on to Bontúku, the capital of Jaman. Here they were left cooling their heels while the King there finalised a treaty with the French, who had been quicker off the mark. The expedition was recalled after five months. Bleiler asserts, without any supporting evidence, that "It was mostly through Freeman's intelligence and tact that the expedition was not massacred". (Note: Freeman's account shows that some of his colleagues were at best intemperate in their dealings with local leaders. Freeman worked with the local authorities to de-escalate things, and this helped to resolve the problems that the Hausa constables were creating with their looting.) Although the mission overall was a failure, the collection of data by Freeman was a success, and his future in the colonial service seemed assured. Unfortunately, he became ill with blackwater fever and was invalided home in 1891, being discharged from the service two months before the minimum qualification period for a pension.

== Career ==
Thus, he returned to London in 1891, and around 1892 served as temporary Acting Surgeon in Charge of the Throat and Ear Department at Middlesex Hospital. He was in general practice in London for about five years. He was appointed acting Deputy Medical Officer of Holloway Prison in about 1901, and Acting Assistant Medical Officer of the Port of London in 1904. A year later he suffered a complete breakdown in his health and gave up medicine for writing.

His first successful stories were the Romney Pringle rogue stories written in collaboration with John James Pitcairn (1860–1936), medical officer at Holloway Prison. Some were published first in Australia, under the joint pen name of Ralph J. Jay, and all of them were serialised under another pseudonym, "Clifford Ashdown" in Cassell's Magazine in 1902 and 1903.

In 1905 Freeman published his first solo novel, The Golden Pool, with the background drawn from his own time in West Africa. The protagonist is a young Englishman who steals a fetish treasure. Barzun and Taylor make the point that while this is a crime, the book was not regarded as crime fiction as "according to old notions" stealing things from Africans "is no crime". (Note: Freeman himself makes the same point in the sixth Danby Croker Story "The Emperor's Keepsake" when Croker compares his uncle, a former Army officer to the burglar Milkey. His uncle called his things "loot," and Milkey called his "swag," but both were acquired in the same way and the difference was only in the name.) Bleiler wrote that "it is a colorful, thrilling story, all the more unusual in being ethnographically accurate" and that "it used to be required reading for members of the British colonial services in Africa."

Freeman's first Thorndyke story, The Red Thumb Mark, was published in 1907, and shortly afterwards he pioneered the inverted detective story, in which the identity of the criminal is shown from the beginning. Some short stories with this feature were collected in The Singing Bone in 1912. During the First World War, he served as an induction physician and a captain in the Royal Army Medical Corps and afterwards produced a Thorndyke novel almost every year until his death in 1943.

== Later life ==
Freeman briefly stopped writing at the outbreak of the Second World War, but then resumed writing in an air-raid shelter he had built in his garden. Freeman was plagued by Parkinson's disease in his later years. This makes his achievement all the more remarkable, as in his declining years he wrote both Mr. Polton Explains, which Bleiler says "... is in some ways his best novel", and The Jacob Street Mystery (1942) in which Roberts considers that Thorndyke "is at his analytical best." He was living at 94, Windmill Street, Gravesend, Kent when he died on 28 September 1943. (Note: This address was registered as Thorndykes Nursing Home on 22 August 1986, and was rated as "Good" by the Care Quality Commission on 2 November 2015. It no longer operates as a nursing home and was sold for £1,175,000 on 17 Feb 2017. It has since been converted into a block of 16 self contained studio apartments, to be available for rent from 1 August 2020.) His estate was valued at £6,471 5s 11d. Freeman was buried in the old Gravesend and Milton Cemetery at Gravesend. The Thorndyke File (Note: This was a journal devoted to the works of Freeman that was founded in 1976 by Philip Asdell and continued in 1981 by John McAleer.) started a funding drive to erect a granite marker for Freeman's grave, and this was erected in September 1979, with the text: Richard Austin Freeman, 1862 – 1943, Physician and Author, Erected by the friends of "Dr. Thorndyke", 1979.

== Political views ==
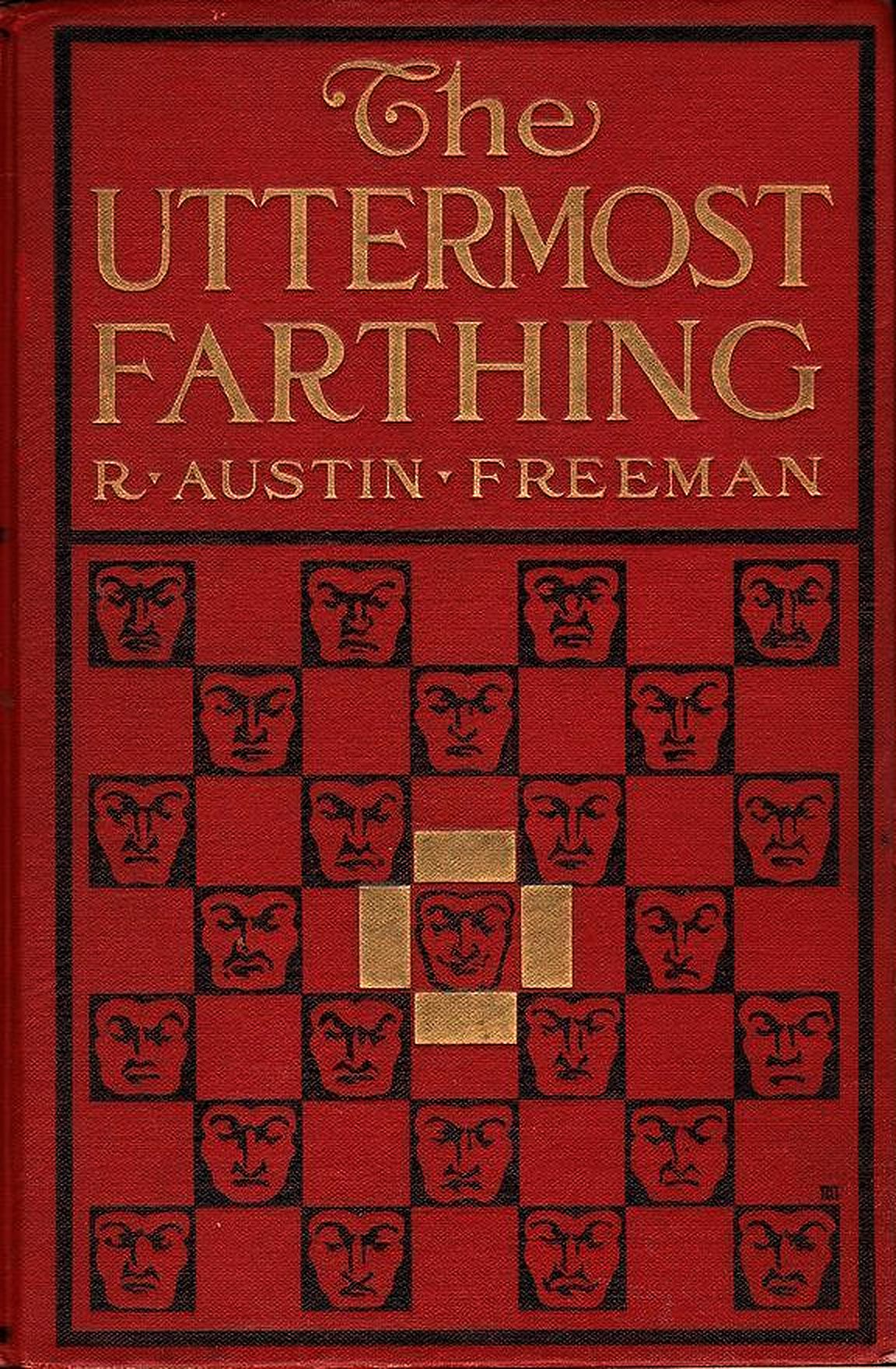
The Uttermost Farthing cover, illustrated by H. Weston Taylor

Freeman held conservative political views. In his 1921 book Social Decay and Regeneration Freeman put forth the view that mechanization had flooded Britain with poor-quality goods and created a "homogenized, restless, unionized working class". Freeman supported the eugenics movement and argued that people with "undesirable" biological traits should be prevented from breeding through "segregation, marriage restriction, and sterilization". The book also attacked the British Labour movement and criticised the British government for permitting immigrants (whom Freeman referred to as "Sub-Man") to settle in Britain. Social Decay and Regeneration referred to the Russian Revolution as "the Russian catastrophe" and argued that society needed protection from "degenerates of the destructive or "Bolshevik type." Sections of Social Decay and Regeneration were reprinted in Eugenics Review, the journal of the British Eugenics Society.

== Anti-Semitism ==
Freeman's views on Jewish people were complex stereotypes. They are clearly set out in his eugenicist book Social Decay and Regeneration (1921). Here Freeman states that of vulgarity "the only ancient peoples who exhibited it on an appreciable scale were the Jews and especially the Phoenician." Freeman notes that a large proportion of the "Alien Unfit" crowding the East End of London, "largely natives of Eastern Europe" are Jews. However, the criticism is of the poor rather than of Jews overall as these unfit aliens were "far from being the elect of their respective races". Freeman regards that, through restricting marriage with non-Jews, Jews as having practised racial segregation "for thousands of years with the greatest success and with very evident benefit to the race". Not surprisingly, some of these views spill over into his fiction.

Grost states that Helen Vardon's Confession (1922) "is another bad Freeman novel suffering from offensive racial stereotypes". Helen Vardon is blackmailed into marrying the fat, old, money-lender Otway, who was "distinctly Semitic in appearance", and is surrounded by Jews, to save her father from prison. Otway acts in bad faith, and is grasping, keeping only one servant despite his great wealth. The whole plot is a gratuitously offensive anti-Semitic stereotype. Grost also states that the use of racial stereotypes in The D'Arblay Mystery (1926) "marks it as a low point in Freeman's fiction". However, the villain is not Jewish at all, and the only question of stereotypes comes up in the questions about whether the villain's (false) hooked nose is "a curved Jewish type, or a squarer Roman nose?" There are no anti-Semitic tropes in the book, no grasping money-lender etc. Grost describes Pontifex, Son and Thorndyke (1931), as degenerating into "another of Freeman's anti-Semitic diatribes". In this novel the villains are largely Jewish, and come from the community of "unfit aliens" that Freeman lambastes in Social Decay and Regeneration.

Such offensive representations of Jews in fiction were typical of the time. Rubinstein and Jolles note that while the work of many of the leading detective story writers, such as Agatha Christie, Dorothy L. Sayers, and Freeman, featured many gratuitously negative depictions of stereotyped Jewish characters, this ended with the rise of Hitler, and they then portrayed Jews and Jewish refugees in a sympathetic light. Thus with Freeman, the later novels no longer present such gratuitously offensive racial stereotypes, but present Jews much more positively.

In When Rogues Fall Out (1932) Mr. Toke describes the Jewish cabinetmaker Levy as "A most excellent workman and a thoroughly honest man", high praise from Freeman's pen. The counsel for Dolby the burglar, "a good-looking Jew named Lyon" executes a particularly brilliant defence of his client which Thorndyke admires. In Felo de Se; or Death at the Inn (1937) the croupier is described as "a pleasant-faced Jew, calm, impassive and courteous, though obviously very much 'on the spot'". In The Stoneware Monkey (1938), Thorndyke is using a young Jewish man as his messenger. In Mr Polton Explains (1938), Polton is assisted first by the Jewish watchmaker Abraham and then by the Jewish solicitor Cohen, who comes to Polton's aid not once but twice, not only representing him without cost, but feeding him and lending him money without interest or term.

== Critical assessment ==
Freeman was a significant author of detective fiction in his day. He was most famous for his creation of Dr. Thorndyke, and many of the obituaries recording his death referred to this in the headlines. Thus the Birmingham Daily Gazette announced "'Dr. Thorndyke' Creator Dead", the Belfast News-Letter announced "Obituary Dr. R. A. Freeman, Creator of 'Dr. Thorndyke'", and the Evening Star (Dunedin) announced "Obituary: Creator of Dr. Thorndyke".

Critical comment has tended to concentrate on four aspects of Thorndyke: Freeman's quality as a writer; the close attention to logic, scientific accuracy and methods in his stories; the invention of the inverted detective story; and comparisons with Sherlock Holmes. The Times considered that the second and third of these were what singled Freeman "out from the ruck".

=== Writing ===
In Bloody Murder, Julian Symons wrote that Freeman's "... talents as a writer were negligible. Reading a Freeman story is very much like chewing dry straw." Symons then went on to criticise the way in which Thorndyke spoke. De Blacam also noted Thorndyke's "ponderous legal phraseology". However, that pedantic ponderousness is the nature of Thorndyke's character. He is a barrister and used to weighing his words carefully. He never discusses his analysis until he has built the whole picture. Others do not agree with his assessment of Freeman's writing skills. Raymond Chandler, in a 13 December 1949 letter to Hamish Hamilton said: "This man Austin Freeman is a wonderful performer. He has no equal in his genre and he is also a much better writer than you might think, if you were superficially inclined, because in spite of the immense leisure of his writing he accomplishes an even suspense which is quite unexpected."

Binyon also rates Freeman's writing as inferior to Doyle saying "Thorndyke might be the superior detective, Conan Doyle is undeniably the better writer." The Birmingham Daily Post considered that "Mr. Austin Freeman was not, perhaps, among the finer artists of the short story, and his longer stories could limp, sometimes" but that his approach was very effective.

However, de Blacam makes the point that, quite apart from the description of the investigation, each of the descriptions of the crimes in the inverted stories "was a fine piece of descriptive writing". Grost agrees that "Freeman's descriptive writing is excellent" Adey finds that: "Freeman's writing, though lacking Doyle's atmospheric touch, was clear and concise, with dry humor and a keen eye for deductive detail." Adams agreed that Freeman had considerable powers of narrative description when he stated that "Nothing but the author's remarkable skill in character delineation and graphic narrative" could save his stories from being regarded as technical studies for a course on forensic medicine.

The proof of the pudding is in the eating, and Bleiler noted in 1973 that Freeman "... is one of the very few Edwardian detective story writers who are still read".

=== The inverted story ===
Nowadays, the inverted detective story, where we first witness the crime and then watch the attempt to solve it, is commonplace. For example, this is the format of almost every episode of the television detective series Columbo starring Peter Falk. However, this approach was an innovation in November 1910 when Freeman's "Oscar Brodski" appeared in Pearson's Magazine. and immediately attracted attention. The Northern Whig said that "Oscar Brodski" was "one of the most powerful detective stories we have ever read". Bleiler said that this story "has always been considered one of the landmarks in the history of the detective story".

In his essay The Art of the Detective Story Freeman wrote that in the inverted story: "The reader had seen the crime committed, knew all about the criminal, and was in possession of all the facts. It would have seemed that there was nothing left to tell, but I calculated that the reader would be so occupied with the crime that he would overlook the evidence. And so it turned out. The second part, which described the investigation of the crime, had to most readers the effect of new matter." However, Binyon notes that Freeman is being too modest here, and that it was Freeman's art that kept the reader's attention in the second part.

Reviewers approved of Freeman's inverted tales. The Scotsman said that Freeman had "... proved that a tale which tells the story of the crime first, leaving us to follow the sleuth as he tracks the criminal down, may be at least as absorbing as the old yarns which left us in the dark until the end". Rodgers noted that "Great narrative skill is needed in order to keep the reader's interest" in a story where the crime if revealed at that start and that there have been imitators "Freeman alone stands as not only the originator, but as the most successful proponent of this form of detective fiction".

=== Precision of logic, facts, and method ===
Freeman paid a great deal of attention to details, and carried out the experiments described in his books to ensure that they worked and would give the expected results. He also went to the trouble of visiting the places he wrote about so that the details in his descriptions were correct. De Balcam says that "Freeman displays a mastery of craftsmanship" in every story, and that he always used the language of the trade concerned. Freeman is "a man who writes of things that he has seen, handled and understood, and not of things that he has met only in print, or in a hazy, inattentive observation". This is a critical aspect of Freeman - he tested the methods he used. The top floor of his house was a workshop and laboratory, and his books sometimes included drawings or micrographs (Note: Micrographs are photographs or digital images taken through a microscope or similar device.) illustrating the evidence.

One instance that shows that the methods and approaches described by Freeman were practicable lies in the prosecution of an apprentice from Barrow for coining. The apprentice had followed a method described in one of the Danby Croker stories by Freeman, and had produced a number of sovereigns that he had successfully passed.

The Birmingham Post noted that his attention to forensic science was fuller and "certainly more systematically than any other writer of detective stories" and that the accuracy of his stories gained him "an exceptionally large proportion of readers of the more exacting and less easily satisfied type".

On logic Adams stated that to read Freeman's cases intelligently "... implies a definite exercise in the use of 'Mill's Canons of Inductive Logic'" and the books offered a very practical means of testing students' understanding of the canons. Herbert notes that Thorndyke's reasoning "... is distinguished by its rigorous logic". Thorndyke, like his creator, was a medical man and also a barrister, and "combined his legal and medical training into a personage of willful dominance, impeccable logic, and scholarly and comprehensive inductive reasoning".

=== Comparisons with Sherlock Holmes ===
Inevitably, commentators compared Thorndyke with Holmes. Binyon says that Thorndyke stands out from the other late Victorian and early Edwardian detectives in being a rival to Sherlock Holmes, rather than just owing their existence to his success. "Thorndyke is the most impressive and the most intellectually powerful of fictional detectives." Poupard notes that "In critical comparisons with Holmes, Dr. Thorndyke is deemed the more accurate thinker and ranked superior as a scientific authority, whereas Holmes is considered the superior literary creation". One immediate clue to the difference between Thorndyke and Holmes, is that Holmes calls his inductive reasoning deduction, a mistake that Thorndyke would never make. Binyon notes that Holmes often makes factual errors, referring to the blue carbuncle as crystallised charcoal, when it contains no carbon, and referring to non-existent species or martial arts.

Ward compares how Holmes deals with a hat as a clue in Doyle's short story The Adventure of the Blue Carbuncle (1892) with how Thorndyke treats a similar clue in Freeman's short story The Anthropologist at Large (1909). After examining the hat, Holmes declares that:

1. The man is intellectual – as he has a large head size.
2. That he was once well to do, but is no longer – as the hat was an expensive style from three years ago that is now shabby.
3. That he was a man of foresight, but has suffered moral retrogression, probably due to drink – as the hat has had a safety guard fitted to it, but the owner has failed to renew the elastic.
4. That he is middle-aged, has grizzled hair which had recently been cut and that he used lime cream – from an examination of the lining
5. That his wife has ceased to love him – as the hat has not been brushed for weeks (there is other evidence that he is married).
6. That he probably does not have town-gas in his house – as there are several tallow stains, presumably from guttering candles, on the hat.

For his part, the first observation that Thorndyke makes is that hats often change owners over their lives, so one needs to interpret the evidence with caution. This immediately explodes at least the second and third of Holmes's conclusions. Thorndyke then induces that:

1. The man is Japanese – from the shape of the head, as the hat has clearly been steamed to fit a particular head, and from a hair sample, which matches Japanese rather than European or African hair.
2. That he works at a mother of pearl factory – due to the large amount of pearl shell dust inside the hat. At the time, this business was largely carried out by Japanese and Chinese immigrants.
3. That he is a decent orderly man – as there is no accumulation of dust on the outside of his hat.

Ward notes that Thorndyke's conclusions are sound, less capricious, and more practical, and allow Thorndyke to track his man down, whereas Holmes has to advertise to find his.

Herbert notes that in comparison to Holmes, "Thorndyke has no eccentricities, and his reasoning, unlike that of his contemporary, is distinguished by its rigorous logic – considered purely as a detective, he is perhaps the most impressive of all fictional sleuths".

== Bibliography ==
=== Longer works by Freeman including collaborations ===
The following list is based on:

- The entries for Freeman, and the pseudonym, Clifford Ashdown, for his collaboration with John James Pitcairn in the Jisc Library Hub Discover catalogue. (Note: The Jisc catalogue, collates 165 national, university, and research libraries in the UK and Ireland.)
- The list of Freeman titles in Make Mine a Mystery by G. W. Neibuhr
- The list of Freeman and Ashdown titles in A Catalogue of Crime by Barzun and Taylor.
- The list provided in the Dictionary of Literary Biography by John McAleer.
- The list in the Crime Fiction 1749-1980: A Bibliography, by Hubin.

Longer works written by Freeman including short story collections and non-fiction.
Ser	UK Pub		Thorndyke	Other Author	Pages	First publication	Other Publication	Notes
1	1893	A Journey to Bontúku : In the Interior of West Africa			p. [117]-146, illus., fold. Map, 25 cm.	Lon: Royal Geographical Society		(Note: This account of Freeman's travels in the interior of West Africa was published by the Royal Geographical Society in Supplementary Papers Volume 3. Trinity College, Dublin dates this as 1893, but the national archives in the UK date this as 1891. Presumably, the original report from Freeman was dated 1891 and the report was published by the RGS in 1893. The journey is also covered by Travels and life in Ashanti and Jaman.)
2	1898	Travels and Life in Ashanti and Jaman			xx, 559p., fs., ill., maps (1 fold.), 24 cm.	Lon: Constable	NY: Stokes	(Note: Tells the story of Freeman journey as doctor, naturalist and surveyor for an expedition to Ashanti and Jaman over five months in 1888 and 1889. While the mission was a political failure, one useful product of the whole expedition were Freemans notes on flora, fauna, soils, geology, costumes, customs, and institutions of both Ashanti and Jaman. The book also has a chapter discussing Malaria. The book was in the Cass library of African studies: Travels and narratives no. 17. The Graphic, in a review of more than half a page, noted that Freeman's concluding chapters about the future of the region were pessimistic.)
3	1902	The Adventures of Romney Pringle, etc.	Romney Pringle	J. J. Pitcairn	198 p, 1pl., 8º	Lon: Ward Lock	Phil.: Train (1968)	(Note: Written with John James Pitcairn. The Oxford Companion to Crime etc. describes Romney Pringle thus: poses as a literary agent who earns a living by swindling crooks out of their ill- gotten gains. The stories appeared in volume 34 of Cassell's Magazine from June to November 1902 on pages: 54-62, 185-194, 271-279, 380-389, 503-512, and 590-598. June began with The Adventures of Romney Pringle: The Assyrian rejuvenator, and November ended the series The Adventures of Romney Pringle: The Kailyard Novel. However, by the end of October the review desks already had the printed volume of stories from Ward Lock. The book has a strong under-current of tongue-in-cheek humour.)
4	1905	The Golden Pool: A Story of a Forgotten Mine			vii, 341, 8, 8 p., 8º	Lon: Cassell	NY: Cassell	(Note: This was Freeman's first solo foray into book-length fiction. The story is set in West Africa, which Freeman knew well. Richard Engelfield was the supercargo of a trading brig, who, inspired by finding the log-book of an early Portuguese trader, went up-country in the disguise of a Fulah merchant and found a fabled Golden Pool and its treasures. Caught and condemned to blinding, he escapes and finally makes his way to the coast after many adventures. The Manchester Courier called it a spirited and interesting story, but said it was slightly overburdened by detail. The Scotsman said it is told in that persuasive matter-of-fact manner which . . . is best for a yarn of this sort.)
5	1907	The Red Thumb Mark	Yes		232 p., 8º	Lon: Collingwood	NY: Newton (1911)	(Note: This was Freeman's first book-length crime mystery. It also introduced Thorndyke. However, Thorndyke had first been conceived in 1905 for an then unpublished story called Thirty-one New Inn. Howard Haycraft says that In respect to puzzle-and-solution this remarkable volume remains one of the undisputed milestones of the genre. Even so, Freeman had to publish it at his own expense with Collingwood Brothers, a jobbing printer. Serialised in the US in 1911. The story resolved in part around a Thumb o'Graphs, a book for collecting the thumb prints of friends. This was a real product, having been introduced by the stationer and publisher Dow and Lester in 1904. The book had only one page of writing, instructing the users how to use the attached ink pad to take a clear impression of thumbs for the book. Freeman thought that this was a dangerous product and wrote the story partly to demonstrate this.)
6	1909	John Thorndyke's Cases (Dr. Thorndyke's Cases in US)	Yes		246p., ill., plan, 8vo.	Lon: Chatto & Windus	NY: Dodd, Mead (1931)	(Note: Published as Dr Thorndyke's Cases in the US. A collection of eight short stories featuring four people falsely accused of murder, one of which is a locked-room mystery, a kidnapping, a secret message, a faked suicide, and an effort to drive someone insane. The stories first appeared as a series of short stories in Pearson's Magazine starting with the Christmas double number of the magazine in December 1908.)
7	1911	The Eye of Osiris (The Vanishing Man in US)	Yes		viii, 304, 8 p., 8º	Lon: Hodder & Stoughton	NY: Dodd, Mead	(Note: Published as The Vanishing Man in the US. The well-known archaeologist Bellingham, disappears from the home of his relative. Thorndyke investigates and rescues a young man falsely accused of the crime. Grost call this book Freeman's masterpiece and said that it appears to be paradigmatic of the Golden Age Detective Novel. The Portadown News called it one of the most thoroughly satisfying detective romances that has appeared for years. The Scotsman said . . . it says much for the author's power of construction that our interest never flags, and curiosity remains unabated to the very end.)
8	1912	The Mystery of 31, New Inn	Yes		xii, 311 p., 8º	Lon: Hodder & Stoughton	Phil.: Winston (1913)	(Note: A story of suspected poisoning and conflicting wills. Thorndyke had first been conceived in 1905 for unpublished short story called Thirty-one New Inn. That story was later reworked to novella length (over 30,000 words) by Freeman and appeared in the January 1911 issue of Adventure (New York). It was then reworked to book length as The Mystery of 31 New Inn. The novella was one of the eight stories in The Best Dr. Thorndyke Detective Stories by R. Austin Freeman (1973). Freeman expanded the Novella by working on it page-to-page.)
9	1912	The Singing Bone	Yes		312 p., 8º	Lon: Hodder & Stoughton	NY: Hodder and Stoughton	(Note: A collection of five short stories which established the inverted detective story. Has a preface by Freeman which sets out why he takes this approach. Each story is presented in two parts. The first part describes the commission of the crime as a third-person narration, the second presents the work of John Thorndyke to uncover the crime, narrated by Christopher Jervis. Initially published as stories in Pearson's magazine starting with the 1910 Christmas number. Re-published in the US by Dodd, Mead in 1923, under the title The Adventures of Dr. Thorndyke. Re-issued in the US as Popular Library 122 paperback in 1947. The first story in the collection was The Case of Oscar Brodski and Bieler says that this has always been considered one of the landmarks in the history of the detective story. The Northern Whig said that Oscar Brodski was one of the most powerful detective stories we have ever read.)
10	1913	The Unwilling Adventurer			389 p., 8º	Lon: Hodder & Stoughton	NY: Hodder and Stoughton	(Note: The only historical romance written by Freeman. A young man from Gravesend is accused of the murder of a magistrate's son in 1791 and has to flee. Donaldson said that he could find no corroboration of the statement in a local obituary that Freeman regards this as his best book, but that it could be true. The Manchester Courier called it an encyclopedia of adventure, a history of the incarnation of the spirit adventure. The Northern Whig said that even if Freeman supplies us with nothing startling new he reheats the old material very brightly and as convincingly as possible.)
11	1914	The Uttermost Farthing: A Savant's Vendetta			296 p., 8º	Phil.: Winston	Lon: Pearson (1920)	(Note: A man seeks revenge for the murder of his young wife by a burglar, by setting traps for burglars and adding their shrunken heads and skeletons to his anatomical museum. First published in the UK as a serial story in Pearson's Magazine, beginning in April 1913, with the title A hunter of Criminals. Bleiler states that initially no English publisher would reprint it as it was too gruesome. It was first published as a book in the US as The Uttermost Farthing: A Savant's Vendetta, Philadelphia: John C. Winston Company (1914). It was only published in the UK in 1920, and then not by Hodder & Stoughton, but in a cheap pocket edition by Pearson as A Savant's Vendetta. The Buckingham Advertiser called it gruesome but said it was written in powerful fashion and grips. The Belfast Telegraph recommended it to those who like real nerve-testing stories. Initially narrated by Dr. Wharton, Humphrey Challoner's physician, who presents Challoner's account of his murders. The Sheffield Independent said: This is an interesting story, with an attractive dash of grisliness. . . It is published as a cheap pocket edition, it is just the thing for the holidays.)
12	1914	A Silent Witness	Yes		(6), 316 p., 8º	Lon: Hodder & Stoughton	Phil.: Winston (1915)	(Note: Walking late at night, Dr. Jervis discovers a body on a path. He goes to get a constable, but when he returns the body is gone, and he faces scepticism. Republished by Dood, Meads in 1929. Issued as a paperback as Pocket Book No. 184 in 1942. Jervis takes a leading role in this story. The Boston Globe said that it was a detective romance quite out of the ordinary and one that holds the reader's enchained attention through every one of its 400 pages.)
13	1916	The Exploits of Danby Croker			307 p., 8º	Lon: Duckworth		(Note: The full title was The exploits of Danby Croker: Being Extracts from a Somewhat Disreputable Autobiography. A series of twelve sequential stories, with a preface and epilogue, that were first published in The Red Magazine from 1 July to 15 December 1911. As the magazine was a fortnightly, and this represented 12 episodes. These seem to have been published in two series of six stories as The Red Magazine was advertising on 5 October 1911 that the first series of the stories were so popular and that they had so many requests for more, that they had arranged with Freeman to write a further series. Danby Croker, is like Romney Pringle, what Bleiler calls one of the mildly humorous, semi-picaresque characters, persons who live astride the boundary of the law. Danby, a good-hearted young artist, with a poorly developed moral sense, is making his way in the world when a burglar impersonates him and creates a world of trouble for him. This is one of the books that Donaldson describes as being marred by frivolity, and that Bleiler describes as having a lightness of touch that makes them distinctive, although Bleiler acknowledges that some readers find their flippancy distasteful.)
14	1918	The Great Portrait Mystery	Yes		318 p., 8º	Lon: Hodder & Stoughton		(Note: Seven stories, of which only two, both inverted detective stories, feature Thorndyke. The other are respectively: a treasure hunt, the tale of a put-upon curate whose character changes when he acquires an Ashanti charm, a porcelain robbery, a complicated probate, and the finding of a treasure and its consequences. The Sketch says that they were as clever and as entertaining as any he has done.)
15	1921	Social Decay and Regeneration			xx, 345 p; 24 cm.	Lon: Constable	Boston & NY: Houghton Mifflin	(Note: Freeman was interested in eugenics and Bleiler says that this book created a stir when it was first published. It has an introduction by Havelock Ellis and Dean Inge reviewed it over ten pages. Freeman's stories embody many of the ideas expressed in the book, but Bleiler notes that these ideals seem less palatable when expounded seriously, and that Reading it today is not always pleasant. Abrams says that the book outlined mixed perceptions of a Jewish/Black sexual threat.)
16	1922	Helen Vardon's Confession	Yes		335 p., 8º	Lon: Hodder & Stoughton		(Note: This book was never published in the United States. Grost calls this another bad Freeman novel suffering from offensive racial stereotypes. The book is an example of the anti-Semitic trope in which a beautiful and gifted gentile maiden, Helen Vardon, is blackmailed through the threat of prison for her father, into marrying the fat, and much older, Jewish moneylender Otway. However Otway acts in bad faith and Helen's father dies while arguing with him. Helen separates from Otway as a condition for supporting his story about the death of her father. Helen moves to a commune of women artists run by Polton's sister. Helen is suspected to encouraging Otway to suicide, when he apparently takes his own life. Thorndyke resolves things. The Shepparton Advertiser said that the story moves slowly and is, at times, rather stilted but that there are some interesting passages dealing with pottery and metal work. Barzun and Taylor note that Thorndyke plays a relatively minor part and that, surprisingly, Thorndyke's evidence contains a minor mistake or two.)
17	1923	Dr. Thorndyke's Case-Book (The Blue Scarab in the US)	Yes		317 p., 8º	NY: Dodd Mead, (1924)		(Note: US title: The Blue Scarab. A collection of seven short stories, including: four persons falsely accused of murder, one kidnapping, one hidden loot, one robbery, and one person being driven to suicide. Serialised in Pearson's Magazine from March 1923. The stories cover, a false accusation of murder, a treasure hunt, a safe deposit fraud, a missing will, a tale of hidden loot, stolen ingots, and a faked suicide.)
18	1923	The Cat's Eye	Yes		304 p., 8º	Lon: Hodder & Stoughton	NY: Dodd, Mead (1927)	(Note: Thorndkye's Counsel Anstey is on the spot when a man is murdered at Rowan Lodge, and saves a young woman from one of the robbers. From there on, it gets more complicated. It was serialised in the Westminster Gazette with the first episode on Saturday 7 April 1923. Grost says that the novel seems pretty uninspired with an easily guessed mystery plot . . . some damsel-in-distress thriller elements and a labored hidden treasure story. The News (Adelaide) calls it a A good Book for the Holidays)
19	1924	The Mystery of Angelina Frood	Yes		320 p., 8º	Lon: Hodder & Stoughton	NY: Dodd, Mead (1925)	(Note: A young woman is subject to spousal abuse, separates from her husband, but is unable to escape him as he repeatedly tracks her down. Against this background this is a light-hearted handling of Dickens’s unfinished Mystery of Edwin Drood which debunks the fallacious belief that quicklime corrodes dead bodies. The Philadelphia Inquirer calls it a story that will keep the reader chained to it until it is finished. Grost says that the first half of the book sets forth a well-constructed mystery plot about an abused woman but the second half is full of red herrings and the writing and plotting become arch, making it less than a genuine detective story.)
20	1925	The Puzzle Lock	Yes		320 p., 8º	Lon: Hodder & Stoughton	NY: Dodd, Mead (1926)	(Note: A collection of nine short stories featuring Thorndyke. The feature a story where Thorndyke succeeds in opening a vault secured with a puzzle-lock, a missing authority on prehistoric flints, an apparent suicide, a young woman wrongly accused of murder, a bio-terrorist, a wife wrongly accused of trying to poison her husband, the murder of a blackmailer, an effort to drive someone insane, and a fraudulent probate case. The Philadelphia Inquirer calls them nine capital stories and that the base of a complete novel can be seen in every one of the stories.)
21	1925	The Shadow of the Wolf	Yes		320 p., 8º	Lon: Hodder & Stoughton	NY: Dodd, Mead	(Note: The Wolf referred to is the Wolf Rock, which lies between Land's End and the Isles of Scilly. A man goes missing after going sailing with a friend. His wife appeals to Thorndyke, and he solves the mystery. This is an inverted detective story. The Hull Daily Mail notes that The reader knows what has happened from the first, but the interest is sure to be sustained, while the methods of Dr Thorndyke . . . are revealed. This was an expansion of a novella The Dead Hand that was published in Pearson's Magazine in October and November 1912. McAleer notes that unlike 31 New Inn where Freeman expanded the novella to novel length by adding page to page, this was expanded by dropping a large swatch of new material in the middle of the story.)
22	1926	The D'Arblay Mystery	Yes		312 p., 8º	Lon: Hodder & Stoughton	NY: Dodd, Mead	(Note: Dr Grey is looking for a place to paint a landscape when he comes across Marion D'Arblay searching for her missing father. Grost says that the use of racial stereotypes marks it as a low point in Freeman's fiction However, it is not as Grost calls it, an anti-Semitic diatribe, as the villain is not Jewish at all, and the only question of stereotypes comes up in the questions about whether the villain's (false) hooked nose is a curved Jewish type or, or a squarer Roman nose? There are no anti-Semitic tropes in the book, no grasping money-lender etc. It was serialised in The Westminster Gazette starting on Friday 19 March 1926. The Albany Advertiser says that it is a very interesting yarn, with the interest well-sustained throughout. . . McAleer says in this, as in The Shadow of the Wolf, Thorndyke's powers of deduction operate at their finest. Polton plays a large role in this novel, and the Albany Dispatch says that one is often left wondering which is the cleverer, Dr. Thorndyke or Polton.)
23	1927	The Magic Casket	Yes		309 p., 8º	Lon: Hodder & Stoughton	NY: Dodd, Mead	(Note: A collection of nine short stories including a tale of hidden loot, a faked death, a young woman falsely accused of murder, a faked suicide, a faked alibi, three cases with men falsely accused of murder, and a murder where the murder made it look as he were the victim. The stories first appeared in Pearson's Magazine, starting in October 1926.)
24	1927	A Certain Dr. Thorndyke	Yes		310 p., 8º	Lon: Hodder & Stoughton	NY: Dodd, Mead (1927)	(Note: Osmond is fleeing an arrest warrant when he arrives in West Africa. He has various adventures, with Freeman skilfully using his knowledge of the region. He is eventually cleared by Thorndyke. Several parts of this story seem to have appeared as short stories in various venues including: The Mutiny on the Speedwell, (October 1914), People's Magazine, pages 815-828; The Gun Runner. (June 1914), Novel Magazine; and possibly A Question of Salvage, (September 1916) in Cassell’s Magazine, pages 33-38. The Evening Star (Dunedin) says that the story is splendidly constructed, and the solving of the mystery keeps the reader interested to the very end.)
25	1927	The Surprising Experiences of Mr. Shuttlebury Cobb			281 p., 8º	Lon: Hodder & Stoughton		(Note: A young solicitor's clerk is sent on a mission to a market town, and comes across an old mystery. He has to face off a senior police officer, the Russian secret police, and a gang of burglars. This is one of the books that Donaldson describes as being marred by frivolity. The Southern Argus says It's a capital book, full of excitement and merriment. . .)
26	1928	As a Thief in the Night	Yes		320 p., 8º	Lon: Hodder & Stoughton	NY: Dodd, Mead	(Note: Narrated by the solicitor Mayfield. Dr Jervis is now in the employ of the Home Office. A wife who spends all her time campaigning for votes for women is accused of poisoning her husband. Thorndyke resolves the question. The Deseret News says that the book belongs to the highest type of mystery story. The plot is logical, interesting, and ingenious. The writing is thoroughly competent.)
27	1928	Flighty Phyllis			315 p., 8º	Lon: Hodder & Stoughton		(Note: A young woman is tempted to impersonate her male cousin and engages in a lot of cross-dressing as her life gets complicated. The Maryborough Chronicle said that the story never drags; it is wholesome and very refreshing. The Newcastle Sun calls it an original, and highly amusing story. The Northern Whig says that The narrative . . . makes very amusing reading. This is one of the stories which Donaldson describes as being marred by frivolity.)
28	1929	The Famous Cases of Dr. Thorndyke	Yes		viii, 1080 p., 8º	Lon: Hodder & Stoughton		(Note: An omnibus of short stories that had already appeared in published collections. Included some of the short stories published in John Thorndyke's Cases, and all of the stories collected in The Singing Bone, Dr. Thorndyke's Casebook, The Puzzle Lock and The Magic Casket. Both the UK and US editions were missing The Man with the Nailed Shoes (a rather long story of over 19,000 words) and A Message from the Deep Sea. The UK edition was also missing The Mandarin's Pearl. All of the missing stories were from the first collection, John Thorndyke's Cases. Thus the UK edition had 37 stories, and the US edition, entitled The Dr. Thorndyke Omnibus, had 38. The Waikato Independent said The book is a remarkably clever one. Much of the matter is of engrossing interest, appealing to one's reason and affording much thoughtful speculation.)
29	1930	Dr. Thorndyke Investigates	Yes		159 p., 8º	Lon: Univ. of Lon. Press		(Note: Five Thorndyke stories drawn from previous collections. Two with people falsely accused of murder, one with a safe deposit robbery, one with a hidden haul of loot, and one with a missing will. Issues as part of the Treasuries of Modern Prose by the University of London Press. The West Australian suggests that, as the stories have been selected from other collections of Thorndyke stories, they are as good as anything of the kind that has appeared in recent fiction dealing with mystery and crime.)
30	1930	Mr. Pottermack's Oversight	Yes		319 p., 8º	Lon: Hodder & Stoughton	NY: Dodd, Mead	(Note: An inverted detective story, or rather a story in six sections, two of which are full inverted detective stories, three of which describe the activities of the main character who reacts badly to being blackmailed, and one describes Thorndyke's investigation. McAleer notes that this story is by some considered Freeman's masterpiece. Re-issued as a Collier (No. AS416Y) paperback in the US in 1962. Listed as being amongst best of the Thorndyke series by the Dunedin Evening Star.)
31	1931	Pontifex, Son and Thorndyke	Yes		320 p., 8º	Lon: Hodder & Stoughton	NY: Dodd, Mead	(Note: A story of a lost heir, and a conspiracy. Grost describes Pontifex, Son and Thorndyke (1931), as degenerating into another of Freeman's anti-Semitic diatribes. In this novel the villains are largely Jewish, and come from the community of unfit aliens that Freeman lambastes in Social Decay and Regeneration.)
32	1932	When Rogues Fall Out (Dr. Thorndyke's Discovery in US)	Yes		320 p., 8º	Lon: Hodder & Stoughton	NY: Dodd, Mead	(Note: US title: Dr Thorndyke's Discovery. As well as the 1932 hardback publication by Dodd, it was published as Avon Paperback (no. 10) in the US in 1941 (with the US title).Roberts says: Those who prefer their mystery fiction to feature numerous seemingly-unrelated threads will revel in this classic Thorndyke story. The Aberdeen Press and Journal says Freeman . . . has very few rivals in the true detective story, but we must confess that it a considerable time since we read any tale of his that struck us so much . . .)
33	1933	Dr. Thorndyke Intervenes	Yes		317 p., 8º	Lon: Hodder & Stoughton		(Note: Narrated in the third person, and then by Dr. Jervis. When Dobson arrives at Fenchurch Street Station to claim the loot from a robbery that has been left at the luggage room, he instead finds a head in his bag. This the start of a complicated puzzle with two different mysteries. The Dunedin Evening Star counts this book as being among the best of the Thorndyke series. The Poverty Bay Herald says . . . it is Thorndyke, and at his best.)
34	1934	For the Defence: Dr. Thorndyke	Yes		319 p., 8º	Lon: Hodder & Stoughton	NY: Dodd, Mead	(Note: Narrated in the third person. Jervis appears, but does not narrate. A foolish young man is mistaken for his never-do-well cousin and accused of murdering himself. Thorndyke unravels it. This is the only Thorndyke novel in which Polton does not play a part. The Northern Star said that this book would enhance Freeman's reputation for mystery stories. The Australasian says that Freeman has never written a better one.)
35	1936	The Penrose Mystery	Yes		317 p., 8º	Lon: Hodder & Stoughton	NY: Dodd, Mead	(Note: Centers around the disappearance of a keen collector, where one clue is a fragment of Neolithic pottery. The novel led to the excavation of Julliberrie's Grave, an unchambered long barrow in Kent, which plays a key role in the story. The Scotsman said that the book was one of the great lawyer's most notable triumphs.)
36	1937	Felo De Se? (Death at the Inn in the US)	Yes		315 p., 8º	Lon: Hodder & Stoughton	NY: Dodd, Mead	(Note: Called Death at the Inn in the US. The first half is narrated by a bank Clerk called Morrison, the second by Jervis. Concerns the solution to two murders, and the recovery of a fortune. Grost says that this book contains a genuine puzzle plot. The Daily Telegraph (Sydney) calls it a well constructed and ingenious double murder disguised as double suicide.)
37	1938	The Stoneware Monkey	Yes		288 p., 2pl.: ill., 8º	Lon: Hodder & Stoughton	NY: Dodd, Mead (1939)	(Note: A policeman is killed during a jewel robbery at a house in the country. A potter appears to be dying from arsenic poisoning, and then disappears. Thorndyke puts the pieces together. The first part is narrated by Dr. James Oldfield and the second part by Dr. Jervis. Issued as a paperback No. 11 in Popular Library's early Mysteries of Proven Merit series. Breiler calls it a fine performance both as a mystery novel and a satire on modern art. McAleer says that the book is notable for humor, a rarity in Freeman’s work. However, the rarity of humour in Freeman's work is contested as Adey states that Freeman's writing . . . was clear and concise, with dry humor and a keen eye for deductive detail.)
38	1940	Mr. Polton Explains	Yes		285 p., 8º	Lon: Hodder & Stoughton	NY: Dodd, Mead	(Note: Published as a paperback as Popular Library 70 in 1946. The first part is narrated by Polton, the second by Jervis. Features a murder plot that goes wrong. The first part is essentially a biography of Polton and the second the investigation of a crime where Polton's special knowledge comes into play. Roberts says that the novel is sure to delight all those interested in horology. Ghost that he cannot recommend this book. It is well meant, and seriously crafted, but it lacks the imagination of Freeman's best work. However Bleiler says that this story . . . is in some ways his best novel, and the Press in New Zealand called it one of Mr Freeman’s happiest and neatest stories.)
39	1941	Dr. Thorndyke's Crime File: A Selection of His Most Celebrated Cases	Yes		xv p., 344 p., 16 p., 312 p., 18 p., 338 p., 8º	NY: Dodd, Mead		(Note: An omnibus of nearly 1,000 pages edited by Percival Mason Stone. Includes the three previously published novels: The Eye of Osiris; The Mystery of Angelina Frood; and Mr. Pottermack's Oversight interspersed with essays. Two of the essays Meet Dr. Thorndyke and The Art of the Detective Story are by Freeman, while the third 5A King's Bench Walk, is by the volume editor, P. M. Stone.)
40	1942	The Jacob Street Mystery (The Unconscious Witness in the US)	Yes		286 p., 8º	Lon: Hodder & Stoughton	NY: Dodd, Mead	(Note: Called The Unconscious Witness in the US. Also published as Avon Paperback 122 in 1947. This was the last novel written by Freeman, when he was nearly 80. Thomas Pedley is painting a landscape in the countryside when he sees two men being followed by a woman. He notices them because of the woman’s suspicious behaviour. She returns with only one of the men from a place where there is no other exit. When he learns that there has been a murder, he realizes that he and his canvas may have vital evidence. Roberts says that Thorndyke: . . . is at his analytical best in this adventure.)
41	1969	The Further Adventures of Romney Pringle	Romney Pringle	J. J. Pitcairn	216 p., 8º	Phil.: Train		(Note: A set of six stories that first appeared in volume 36 of Cassell's Family Magazine from (June to November 1903) on pages: 73-80, 190-197, 295-303, 390-397, 508-516, and 623-631. Not published in collected form until 1969. The Kilkenny Moderator calls A box of specie, the September 1903 instalment a quaint story, quaintly told.)
42	1973	The Best Dr. Thorndyke Detective Stories, with an introduction by E. F. Bleiler	Yes		ix, 274 p., 8º	NY: Dover		(Note: A collection of eight stories, three from the Singing Bone and four from John Thorndyke's Cases, and the novella Thirty-one New Inn which Freeman expanded into full length novel The Mystery of 31 New Inn. This collection has an introduction by E. F. Bleiler, and was published as a Dover Paperback (no 20388-3) in 1973. Bleiler says that the collection included much of Freeman's best work, but not all of it, and that A half-dozen novels and another half dozen short stories could well have been included.)
43	1973	The Stoneware Monkey & The Penrose Mystery: Two Dr.Thorndyke Novels by R. Austin Freeman, with a new Introduction by E. F. Bleiler	Yes		viii, 440, 15, 8º	NY: Dover		(Note: This was a reissue of these two novels in a single volume paperback by Dover (No. 22963-7). This was a companion volume to The Best Dr. Thorndyke Detective Stories and also featured an introduction by Bleiler. Bleiler states that The Stoneware Monkey (1938) and the succeeding novel mark an Indian summer in Freeman's work. when Freeman was 75 years old. He also credits The Penrose Mystery as being the only novel that sponsored an archaeological dig. The Dunedin Evening Star includes both titles as being amongst the best of the Thorndyke series.)
44	1975	From a Surgeon's Diary	Romney Pringle	J. J. Pitcairn	56 p., 8º	Lon: Ferret Fantasy	Phil.: Train (1977)	(Note: Written with John James Pitcairn under the pseudonym Clifford Ashdown. The six stories in this collection were first published in Cassell's Family Magazine volume 39 (December 1904 to May 1905) on pages: 139-146, 253-261, 321-329, 442-450, 563-571, and 683-690. Tell the adventures of a young doctor acting as locum tenens, in place of established doctors who have gone on leave. Donaldson said the stories intermingled medicine and detection. Re-issued in Volume VI of the Freeman Edition by Battered Silicon Dispatch Box.)
45	1975	The Queen's Treasure		J. J. Pitcairn	238 p., 8º	Phil.: Train		(Note: Written with John James Pitcairn. The manuscript of this novel lay forgotten among the papers of John James Pitcairn. For some reason, it had not sold. It features two men, recently returned from West Africa, competing to find a treasure and to win the heart of the same girl. The novel was issued after thorough editing.)
46	1999	The Other Eye of Osiris	Yes		x, 253 p. : ill., 1 port., 8º	Shelburne: Battered Box		(Note: This is the original manuscript of The Eye of Osiris that was rejected by the publisher because of a love interest.)

=== Short-story collections ===
- John Thorndyke's Cases (1909) (published in the United States as Dr. Thorndyke's Cases)
1. The Man with the Nailed Shoes
2. The Stranger's Latchkey
3. The Anthropologist at Large
4. The Blue Sequin
5. The Moabite Cipher
6. The Mandarin's Pearl
7. The Aluminum Dagger
8. A Message from the Deep Sea
- The Singing Bone (1912) (published in the United States as The Adventures of Dr. Thorndyke)
1. The Case of Oscar Brodski (an inverted short story)
  1. Part I. The Mechanism of Crime
  2. Part II. The Mechanism of Detection
2. A Case of Premeditation (an inverted short story)
  1. Part I. The Elimination of Mr. Pratt
  2. Part II. Rival Sleuth-Hounds
3. The Echo of a Mutiny (an inverted short story)
  1. Part I. Death on the Girdler
  2. Part II. "The Singing Bone"
4. A Wastrel's Romance (an inverted short story)
  1. Part I. The Spinster's Guest
  2. Part II. Munera Pulveris
5. The Old Lag
  1. Part I. The Changed Immutable
  2. Part II. The Ship of the Desert
- The Great Portrait Mystery and other Stories (1918)
1. The Great Portrait Mystery (not a Thorndyke story)
2. The Bronze Parrot (not a Thorndyke story)
3. The Missing Mortgagee (an inverted Thorndyke short story)
4. Powder Blue and Hawthorne (not a Thorndyke story)
5. Percival Bland's Proxy (an inverted Thorndyke short story)
6. The Attorney's Conscience (not a Thorndyke story)
7. The Luck of Barnabas Mudge (not a Thorndyke story)
- Dr. Thorndyke's Casebook (1923) (published in the United States as The Blue Scarab)
1. The Case of the White Footprints
2. The Blue Scarab
3. The New Jersey Sphinx
4. The Touchstone
5. A Fisher of Men
6. The Stolen Ingots
7. The Funeral Pyre
- The Puzzle Lock (1925)
1. The Puzzle Lock
2. The Green Check Jacket
3. The Seal of Nebuchadnezzar
4. Phyllis Annesley's Peril
5. A Sower of Pestilence
6. Rex v. Burnaby
7. A Mystery of the Sand-hills
8. The Apparition of Burling Court
9. The Mysterious Visitor
- The Magic Casket (1927)
1. The Magic Casket
2. The Contents of a Mare's Nest
3. The Stalking Horse
4. The Naturalist at Law
5. Mr. Ponting's Alibi
6. Pandora's Box
7. The Trail of Behemoth
8. The Pathologist to the Rescue
9. Gleanings from the Wreckage
- The Famous Cases of Dr. Thorndyke (London: Hodder & Stoughton, 1929 and later reprintings) -- an omnibus of previously published stories
1. The Case of Oscar Brodski (an inverted short story)
  1. Part I. The Mechanism of Crime
  2. Part II. The Mechanism of Detection
2. A Case of Premeditation (an inverted short story)
  1. Part I. The Elimination of Mr. Pratt
  2. Part II. Rival Sleuth-Hounds
3. The Echo of a Mutiny (an inverted short story)
  1. Part I. Death on the Girdler
  2. Part II. "The Singing Bone"
4. A Wastrel's Romance (an inverted short story)
  1. Part I. The Spinster's Guest
  2. Part II. Munera Pulveris
5. The Missing Mortgagee (an inverted Thorndyke short story)
6. Percival Bland's Proxy (an inverted Thorndyke short story)
7. The Old Lag
  1. Part I. The Changed Immutable
  2. Part II. The Ship of the Desert
8. Stranger's Latchkey
9. The Anthropologist at Large
10. The Blue Sequin
11. The Moabite Cipher
12. The Aluminum Dagger
13. The Magic Casket
14. The Contents of a Mare's Nest
15. The Stalking Horse
16. The Naturalist at Law
17. Mr. Ponting's Alibi
18. Pandora's Box
19. The Trail of Behemoth
20. The Pathologist to the Rescue
21. Gleanings from the Wreckage
22. The Puzzle Lock
23. The Green Check Jacket
24. The Seal of Nebuchadnezzar
25. Phyllis Annesley's Peril
26. A Sower of Pestilence
27. Rex v. Burnaby
28. A Mystery of the Sand-hills
29. The Apparition of Burling Court
30. The Mysterious Visitor
31. The Case of the White Footprints
32. The Blue Scarab
33. The New Jersey Sphinx
34. The Touchstone
35. A Fisher of Men
36. The Stolen Ingots
37. The Funeral Pyre

The American edition of this is R. Austin Freeman, The Dr. Thorndyke Omnibus: 38 of His Criminal Investigations as set down by R. Austin Freeman (New York: Dodd, Mead, 1932 and later reprintings). The American edition includes one story, "The Mandarin's Pearl," printed in the first Thorndyke short-story collection, John Thorndyke's Cases, but omitted from the British omnibus. Two other stories, though also appearing in the first Dr. Thorndyke short-story collection, John Thorndyke's Cases, were omitted from the British and American editions of the omnibus collection: "The Man with the Nailed Shoes" and "A Message from the Deep Sea."

- The Best Dr. Thorndyke Detective Stories (1973), edited by E.F. Bleiler.
1. The Case of Oscar Broski (an inverted short story)
  1. Part I. The Mechanism of Crime
  2. Part II. The Mechanism of Detection
2. A Case of Premeditation (an inverted short story)
  1. Part I. The Elimination of Mr. Pratt
  2. Part II. Rival Sleuth-Hounds
3. The Echo of a Mutiny (an inverted short story)
  1. Part I. Death on the Girdler
  2. Part II. "The Singing Bone"
4. The Mandarin's Pearl
5. The Blue Sequin
6. The Moabite Cipher
7. The Aluminum Dagger
8. 31 New Inn (believed to have been written about 1905 and later expanded to novel length), which was also published in volume I of the Freeman omnibus, published by Battered Silicon Dispatch Box
- The Dead Hand and Other Uncollected Stories, edited by Douglas G. Greene and Tony Medawar (Shelburne, Ontario: The Battered Silicon Dispatch Box, 1999).
1. The Dead Hand. (This story was believed to have been written in 1912 and later expanded to novel length as The Shadow of the Wolf; the short story was also published in Detection by Gaslight, 14 Victorian detective stories, an anthology by Douglas G. Greene (Dover. 1997).
2. The Sign of the Ram
3. The Mystery of Hoo Marsh
4. The Mystery of the Seven Banana Skins
5. Caveat Emptor: The Story of a Pram. Cassell's Family Magazine, 1900
6. Victims of Circumstance. Cassell's Family Magazine, 1900/1
7. The Great Tobacco "Plant". Cassell's Family Magazine, 1901/2
8. Beyond the Dreams of Avarice. Cassell's Family Magazine, 1901/2
9. A Bird of Passage: A Story of the Thames. Cassell's Family Magazine, 1904
10. The Sleuth-Hounds
11. The Free Trip
12. The Comedy of the Artemis
13. The Resurrection of Matthew Jephson. Cassell's Family Magazine, 1898
14. A Signal Success. Royal Magazine
15. The Ebb Tide. Cassell's Family Magazine, 1902/3
16. By the Black Deep
17. A Question of Salvage
18. Under the Clock
19. The Costume Model. Cassell's Family Magazine, 1901/2
20. Ye Olde Spotted Dogge. Cassell's Family Magazine, 1903/4
21. A Suburban Autolycus. Cassell's Family Magazine, 1904
22. A Woman's Vengeance
23. Ruth
24. The Great Slump
25. The Art of the Detective Story
26. The Cleverest Murder - In Fact or Fiction
27. The Peasenhall Mystery
28. Meet Dr Thorndyke

=== Short stories written with John James Pitcairn ===
- "The Assyrian Rejuvenator". Australian Town & Country Journal, 13 and 20 July 1901, as by "Ralph J Jay". Reprinted Cassell's Magazine, June 1902, as by "Clifford Ashdown". Collected in The Adventures of Romney Pringle.
- "The Foreign Office Despatch". Australian Town & Country Journal, 20 and 27 July 1901, as by "Ralph J Jay". Reprinted Cassell's Magazine, July 1902, as by "Clifford Ashdown". Collected in The Adventures of Romney Pringle
- "The Chicago Heiress". Australian Town & Country Journal, 27 July and 3 August 1901, as by "Ralph J Jay". Reprinted Cassell's Magazine, August 1902, as by "Clifford Ashdown". Collected in The Adventures of Romney Pringle
- "The Lizard's Scale". Australian Town & Country Journal, 10 August 1901, as by "Ralph J Jay". Reprinted Cassell's Magazine, September 1902, as by "Clifford Ashdown". Collected in The Adventures of Romney Pringle
- "The Paste Diamonds". Australian Town & Country Journal, 17 August 1901, as by "Ralph J Jay". Reprinted Cassell's Magazine, October 1902, as by "Clifford Ashdown". Collected in The Adventures of Romney Pringle
- "The Kailyard Novel". Australian Town & Country Journal, 24 August 1901, as by "Ralph J Jay". Reprinted Cassell's Magazine, November 1902, as by "Clifford Ashdown". Collected in The Adventures of Romney Pringle
- "The Submarine Boat". Cassell's Magazine, June 1903, as by "Clifford Ashdown". Collected in The Further Adventures of Romney Pringle
- "The Kimberley Fugitive". Cassell's Magazine, July 1903, as by "Clifford Ashdown". Collected in The Further Adventures of Romney Pringle
- "The Silk Worms of Florence". Cassell's Magazine, August 1903, as by "Clifford Ashdown". Collected in The Further Adventures of Romney Pringle
- "The Box of Specie". Cassell's Magazine, September 1903, as by "Clifford Ashdown". Collected in The Further Adventures of Romney Pringle
- "The Silver Ingots". Cassell's Magazine, October 1903, as by "Clifford Ashdown". Collected in The Further Adventures of Romney Pringle
- "The House of Detention". Cassell's Magazine, November 1903, as by "Clifford Ashdown". Collected in The Further Adventures of Romney Pringle
- "The Adventure at Heath Crest". Cassell's Magazine, December 1904, as by "Clifford Ashdown". Collected in From a Surgeon's Diary
- "How I Acted for an Invalid Doctor". Cassell's Magazine, January 1905, as by "Clifford Ashdown". Collected in From a Surgeon's Diary
- "How I Attended a Nervous Patient". Cassell's Magazine, February 1905, as by "Clifford Ashdown". Collected in From a Surgeon's Diary
- "How I Met a Very Ignorant Practitioner". Cassell's Magazine, March 1905, as by "Clifford Ashdown". Collected in From a Surgeon's Diary
- "How I Cured a Hopeless Paralytic". Cassell's Magazine, April 1905, as by "Clifford Ashdown". Collected in From a Surgeon's Diary
- "How I Helped to Lay a Ghost". Cassell's Magazine, May 1905, as by "Clifford Ashdown". Collected in From a Surgeon's Diary

==== Uncollected short stories ====
The short stories from Cassell's Family Magazine are from the index of fiction prepared for the Victorian Fiction Research Unit, Department of English, University of Queensland by Sue Thomas."

- The Mutiny on the Speedwell. Novel Magazine, May 1914 (Jack Osmond). See also A Certain Dr Thorndyke
- The Gun Runner. Novel Magazine, June 1914 (Jack Osmond). See also A Certain Dr Thorndyke

=== Non-fiction ===
- The Phenomena of Exuviation in the Brachyurae. Naturalists' World, July and August 1884, Vol. 1, Parts 7 & 8
- The Interior of the Gold Coast. Macmillan's Magazine, June 1899. Publication of a paper delivered to the Georgraphical section of the British Association on 4 September 1890 in Leeds
- In the London Docks. Living London, January 1902
- Hospital London. Living London, June 1902. Reprinted Living London, December 1902
- Afflicted London. Living London, September 1902. Reprinted Living London, October 1905
- The Coastwise Lights of England. Cassell's Magazine, November 1902
- London below Bridge. Living London, December 1902. Reprinted Living London, January 1906
- The Royal Yacht. Cassell's Magazine, April 1903
- A Thames Sailing Barge Match. Cassell's Magazine, September 1903
- Small Yacht Racing. Cassell's Magazine, May 1904
- The Sentinels of the Port of London. Cassell's Magazine, October 1905
- Down the River. Cassell's Magazine, January 1906
- The Tightening Grip. Straits Times, 5 November 1917
- The Art of the Detective Story. The Nineteenth Century and After, May 1924
- The Pendulum. Brecon County Times, 15 March 1928. Also published as The Swing of the Pendulum
- Hot Boiled Beans. Newark Advertiser, 7 November 1928
- An Englishman's Rights. East London Observer, 19 January 1929
- The Two Aspects of Liberty. Westminster & Pimlico News, 7 April 1933
- From Democracy to Dictatorship - A Contrast Which Is Staggering. Huddersfield Daily Examiner, 1 March 1934. Also published as Democracy to Dictatorship and Where is Democracy Tending?
- Liberty and Property. Nottingham Evening Post, 29 November 1934
- What Has become of Democracy?. Shields Daily News, 15 April 1935
- The Return of the Autocrat - Orders in Council. Linlithgow Gazette, 3 April 1936; also published as The Return of the Autocrats and Our Heritage of Freedom
- Liberty and Intelligence. Portsmouth Evening News, 16 October 1936
- Does Dullness Create Dictatorship?. Hartlepool Northern Daily Mail, 17 October 1936
- Preservation of Liberty. Portsmouth Evening News, 18 June 1937; also published as Liberty and Reciprocity.
- Liberty and Reciprocity - On Being a Good Neighbour. Long Eaton Advertiser, 18 June 1937
- Liberty and Physique. Hartlepool Northern Daily Mail, 29 January 1938
- Enemies of Liberty. Musselburgh News, 18 November 1938
- War is Destructive of Liberty - The Aftermath of Emergencies. Sunderland Daily Echo & Shipping Gazette, 14 July 1939. Also published as Liberty and Peace - The Aftermath of Emergencies. West London Observer, 21 July 1939
- Individualism and War - Sacrifices for a Purpose. Falkirk Herald, 18 October 1939. Also published as War Sacrifices for a Purpose. Grimsby Daily Telegraph, 23 November 1939, and Beware of Waste and Tyranny - Sacrifices for a Purpose
- Hard Cases and Bad Law - Encroachments on Liberty. Hartlepool Northern Daily Mail, 4 April 1940
- Liberties Surrendered for Future Freedom. Portsmouth Evening News, 12 September 1940 [Also published as Hitlerism 'On Appro.', Freeman's original title, Motherwell Times, 13 September 1940]
- Freedom of the Citizen. Hartlepool Northern Daily Mail, 13 September 1940
- Eugenics and Liberty. Falkirk Herald, 23 April 1941; also published as Good Breeding; The Importance of Eugenics. Thanet Adviser, 25 April 1941, and How Eugenics is Linked with Liberty
- What of the Future?. Falkirk Herald, 29 October 1941
- The Passing of Personal Liberty. Hartlepool Northern Daily Mail, 24 April 1942; also published as The Passing of Personal Liberty towards the Human Ant-Hill. West London Observer, 1 May 1942. (Freeman's original title was The Passing of Freedom)
- Liberty and Equality. Falkirk Herald, 9 September 1942
- Medical Profession: Dangers of State Service. 25 November 1942. Also published as Medical Profession and Socialisation of the Medical Profession (Freeman's original title)
- The Doppelganger. Publication unknown
- The Economics of Liberty. Publication unknown
- The Militant's Strategy. Publication unknown
- Is Fingerprint Evidence Fallible?. Publication unknown
- His Majesty's Savings. Publication unknown
- The Renegades. Publication unknown
- The Three Wishes. Publication unknown
- The Unauthorised Raiders. Publication unknown

=== Unpublished Non-fiction ===
- Some Consideration of Truth in Pictures. Talk to the Stock Exchange Art Society at Salisbury House, London Wall, 19 February 1903
- The Naturalistic School. Submitted to Frederic Dannay and intended for publication in Ellery Queen's Mystery Magazine

=== Unconfirmed stories ===
[From the records of Freeman's agent, A. P. Watt, Tony Medawar identified that Freeman had been paid for the following items.]

- The Adventures of Jack Osmond Publication unknown. See also A Certain Dr Thorndyke
- The Auchtermuchtie Burglary Publication unknown
- The Automatic Boat Publication unknown
- La Belle Anglaise Publication unknown
- The Cavern Publication unknown
- A Corpse in the Case Publication unknown. This may be a reference to "Corpse in the Case", an adaptation of Dr Thorndyke Intervenes by Mollie Hardwick, broadcast on the BBC Home Service on 9 June 1962 and starring Cyril Luckham as Thorndyke.
- A Crusader's Misadventures Publication unknown
- The Haarschneide Machine Publication unknown
- Mr Pordle's Homecoming Publication unknown

== Adaptations ==
=== Television adaptations ===
A short series featuring Dr Thorndyke was produced by the BBC in 1964, entitled Thorndyke. The title character was played by veteran British actor Peter Copley.

Based on the stories written by R Austin Freeman, the episodes, all of which except the pilot are missing from the BBC archive, were as follows:

- The Case of Oscar Brodski (Pilot – as part of BBC series "Detective')
- The Old Lag
- A Case of Premeditation
- The Mysterious Visitor
- The Case of Phyllis Annesley
- Percival Bland's Brother
- The Puzzle Lock

Three stories were also adapted as part of the Thames TV series The Rivals of Sherlock Holmes in 1971–3. These were:

- A Message From The Deep Sea (from the 1st series and starring John Neville as Thorndyke)
- The Assyrian Rejuvenator (1st series, starring Donald Sinden as Romney Pringle)
- The Moabite Cipher (2nd series, starring Barrie Ingham as Thorndyke)

Both series are available on DVD – in the UK from Network Video and in the United States from Acornmedia.

=== Radio adaptation ===
Starting in 2011 the BBC aired radio adaptations of some of the Thorndyke short stories, Thorndyke: Forensic Investigator on BBC Radio 4 Extra.

==== Series 1 ====
November 2011 read by Jim Norton

1. A Mysterious Visitor
2. The Puzzle Lock
3. A Mystery of the Sand Hills
4. Pathologist to the Rescue
5. The Secret of the Urn
6. Pandora's Box

==== Series 2 ====
March 2013 read by William Gaminara

1. The Stolen Ingots
2. Rex v Burnaby
3. The Stalking Horse

== In popular culture ==
=== Literature ===
- In Donna Andrews's Owl's Well That Ends Well, a near-mint first-edition copy of The Uttermost Farthing provides the motive for the murder.

== Biographies and studies ==
- R. Austin Freeman: The Anthropologist at Large, Oliver Mayo, Hawthornedene, South Australia: Investigator Press, (1980). This biography, in addition to reviewing Freeman's fiction gives special attention to the African and sociological works. It was reprinted in Volume 11 of the Freeman Edition by Battered Silicon Dispatch Box in 1998.
- In Search of Doctor Thorndyke, Norman Donaldson (Bowling Green, Ohio, 1971). A second expanded edition was published in 1998 as Volume 10 of the Battered Silicon Dispatch Box edition of Freeman.
- The Thorndyke File was started by Philip T. Asdell of Maryland in Spring 1976, and published articles of scholarship on Freeman twice a year. John McAleer took over in 1980 and the journal ran on until 1988. Half of the subscribers were medical doctors.
- John Thorndyke's Journal was published in England from 1991 to 1998 by David Ian Chapman of Aldershot, Hampshire.
- Collecting R. Austin Freeman, David Ian Chapman (Highfield Press, Aldershot, 2022) Revised Second Edition.
- R. Austin Freeman and The Adventures of Romney Pringle: An Investigation, David Ian Chapman (Highfield Press, Aldershot, 2023).
