= Dr. Thorndyke =

John Evelyn Thorndyke
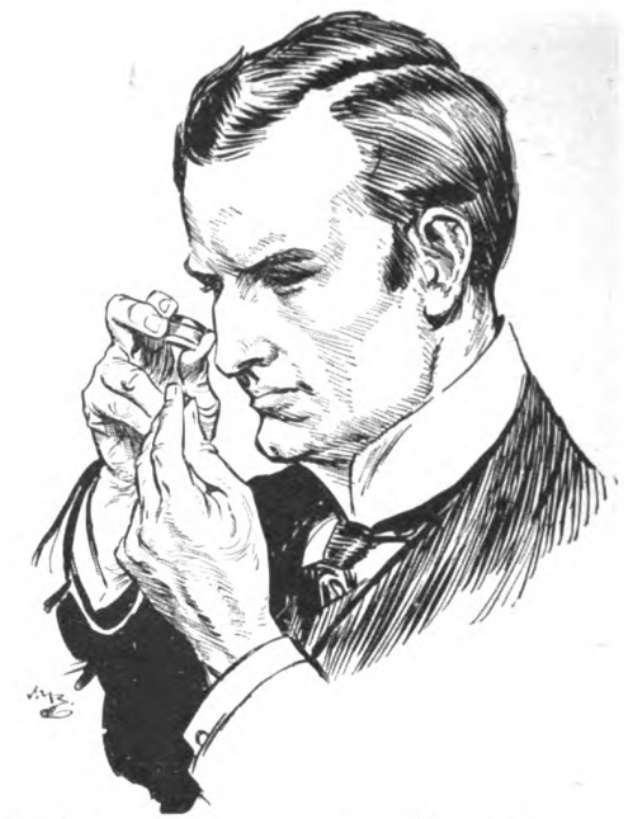
- John Thorndyke as drawn by H. M. Brock in 1908
- First appearance: The Red Thumb Mark (1907)
- Last appearance: The Jacob Street Mystery (1942)
- Created by: R. Austin Freeman
- Portrayed by: Anthony Nicholls (radio); Peter Copley (television); John Neville (television); Barrie Ingham (television); Tim McInnerny (radio)

In-universe information
- Gender: Male
- Title: Dr
- Occupation: Detective
- Nationality: British

Dr. John Evelyn Thorndyke is a fictional detective in a long series of 21 novels and 40 short stories by British author R. Austin Freeman (1862–1943). Thorndyke was described by his author as a 'medical jurispractitioner': originally a medical doctor, he turned to the bar and became one of the first — in modern parlance — forensic scientists. His solutions were based on his method of collecting all possible data (including dust and pond weed) and making inferences from them before looking at any of the protagonists and motives in the crimes. Freeman ensured that his methods were practical by conducting all experiments mentioned in the stories himself.

== Attributes ==
John Evelyn Thorndyke was born on 4 July 1870. He received his medical education at St. Margaret's Hospital, London, where he got his primary degree. Instead of then leaving the hospital, however, he remained there, "taking up any small appointments that were going – assistant demonstrator – or curatorships and such like". He "hung around the chemical and physical laboratories, the museum and post mortem room" and meanwhile qualified as an MD and a DSc. Then he got called to the Bar with an eye to getting an appointment as coroner, but the lecturer on Medical Jurisprudence at St Margaret's retired unexpectedly, and Thorndyke applied for the vacant post. He was appointed to the post, and then set himself up in chambers. His first case was when he appeared for the defence in Regina v. Gummer. Thorndyke resided at 5A King's Bench Walk, Inner Temple. (Note: In Meet Dr. Thorndyke, Freeman gives his address as 4 King's Bench Walk. In The Red Thumb Mark, he directs Jervis to his rooms at 6A King's Bench Walk. In 5A King's Bench Walk, Stone notes that, apart from these lapses, the other books and stories give the address as 5A.) Thorndyke's office and reception room were on the first floor (i.e. the first floor above the ground floor), with the workshop and laboratory on the second floor, and the bedrooms on the attic floor.

He was often assisted by his friend and foil Christopher Jervis, who usually acts as narrator, and always by the resourceful Nathaniel Polton, his crinkly-faced lab technician. Thorndyke had rescued Polton from poverty, after he had been hospitalised for starvation. Polton helped Thorndyke set up the laboratory after he took the rooms at King's Bench Walk. Thorndyke tended to have a better relationship with the police (usually in the form of Superintendent Miller) than Sherlock Holmes did, despite proving them wrong on numerous occasions. Thorndyke, although tall, athletic, handsome, and clever, never married.

Freeman wrote that "Dr. Thorndyke was not based on any person, real or fictitious. He was deliberately invented. In a professional sense he may have been suggested to me by Dr. Alfred Swayne Taylor... but his personality was designed in accordance with certain principles and what I believed to be the probabilities as to what such a man would be like".

Freeman put a great deal of effort into ensuring the accuracy of the Thorndyke stories, including carrying out the described experiments himself, and visiting the locations described in the stories. Freeman had his own lab and workshop on the top floor of his house at Gravesend, where he tested the methods used by Thorndyke. One example of his approach is seen in The Red Thumb Mark. The story revolves in part around the Thumbograph (actually called the Thumb o'Graphs as in autographs), a booklet in which people could collect fingerprints. It was launched on the market in 1904 by the stationer and publisher Dow & Lester, and consisted of a book of blank pages, with a single page of instructions, and an ink pad attached to one of the covers. Freeman noted on the fly-leaf of his own copy of the Red Thumb Mark that the Thumbograph was available at all the railway book-stalls, and that he either bought one or got one as a gift. However, he considered it a dangerous invention, as his observations in the Finger-print Department led him to think it possible to make false fingerprints from a copy of a fingerprint. He experimented with his own fingerprints and made stamps that could reproduce them. Thus he tested the method that the villain uses in the book, and that Thorndyke uses to convince the court, before he wrote about it.

Such is the accuracy of Freeman's writing that P. R. Gordon wrote to The Queenslander in 1913 to suggest that they should publish the description of the life history of the liver fluke that Freeman gives in The Eye of Osiris, as it was "so well and tersely told that it would be read with great interest by sheep owners and others." Leadbeatter described Thorndyke as one of the two pre-eminent fictional forensic pathologists, but noted that Thorndyke sometimes over-interprets the forensic evidence for the sake of the plot. Thus Leadbeatter faulted Thorndyke for excluding the possibility that the odontoid process (a small bone in the neck) of a corpse had been broken by the collapse of the house during the fire in Mr Polton Explains.

== Works ==
Between 1907 and 1942, Thorndyke appeared in 21 novels and 40 short stories.

=== Novels ===
1. 31, New Inn (c. 1905) - novella, later expanded into a novel in 1912
2. The Red Thumb Mark (1907)
3. The Other Eye of Osiris (1909/1910) published in 1999 - The first version was rejected by the publishers but it was published posthumously
4. The Eye of Osiris (1911), published in the United States as The Vanishing Man
5. The Mystery of 31, New Inn (1912)
6. A Silent Witness (1914)
7. Helen Vardon's Confession (1922)
8. The Cat's Eye (1923)
9. The Mystery of Angelina Frood (1924)
10. The Shadow of the Wolf (1925) -- inverted mystery
11. The D'Arblay Mystery (1926)
12. A Certain Dr. Thorndyke (1927)
13. As a Thief in the Night (1928)
14. Mr. Pottermack's Oversight (1930) -- inverted mystery
15. Pontifex, Son and Thorndyke (1931)
16. When Rogues Fall Out (1932), published in the United States as Dr. Thorndyke's Discovery
17. Dr. Thorndyke Intervenes (1933)
18. For the Defence: Dr. Thorndyke (1934)
19. The Penrose Mystery (1936)
20. Felo de se? (1937), published in the United States as Death at the Inn
21. The Stoneware Monkey (1938)
22. Mr. Polton Explains (1940)
23. The Jacob Street Mystery (1942), published in the United States as The Unconscious Witness
- Dr. Thorndyke's Crime File (1941) — omnibus including "Meet Dr. Thorndyke" (essay), The Eye of Osiris (novel), "The Art of the Detective Story" (essay), The Mystery of Angelina Frood (novel), and "5A King's Bench Walk" (essay)

=== Short stories ===
The short-story collections are:

1. John Thorndyke's Cases (1909) (published in the United States as Dr. Thorndyke's Cases).
2. The Singing Bone (1912) (published in the United States as The Adventures of Dr. Thorndyke).
3. Dr. Thorndyke's Casebook (1923) (published in the United States as The Blue Scarab)
4. The Puzzle Lock (1925)
5. The Magic Casket (1927)

Two different omnibus editions of the collected Dr. Thorndyke short stories exist. The British edition is R. Austin Freeman, The Famous Cases of Dr. Thorndyke: Thirty-seven of His Criminal Investigations as set down by R. Austin Freeman (London: Hodder & Stoughton, 1929 and later reprintings). The American edition is R. Austin Freeman, The Dr. Thorndyke Omnibus: 38 of His Criminal Investigations as set down by R. Austin Freeman (New York: Dodd, Mead, 1932 and later reprintings). The American edition includes one story, The Mandarin's Pearl, printed in the first Thorndyke short-story collection, John Thorndyke's Cases, but omitted from the British omnibus. Two other stories, "The Man with the Nailed Shoes" and "A Message from the Deep Sea", though also appearing in the first Dr. Thorndyke short-story collection, John Thorndyke's Cases, were omitted from the British and American editions of the omnibus collection.

The order in the list appearing below is that of the American edition, which reprinted the five collections of stories in the following order (with two omissions already noted and also indicated below): The Singing Bone, Dr. Thorndyke's Cases, The Magic Casket, The Puzzle Lock, and The Blue Scarab. The British edition gives the stories in a different order from that of the American edition, indicated below by a bracketed note appearing after each story title giving its place in the British edition, denoted by the abbreviation UK and a two-digit number.

The first six stories of the list are "inverted" detective stories, divided into two parts. In the first part of each story, Freeman presented an account of the commission of a crime; in the second part, he presented an account, by Thorndyke's colleague Dr. Christopher Jervis, of Dr. Thorndyke's solution of the crime. The remaining stories are called "direct" stories.

A modern publisher, Battered Silicon Dispatch Box, issued a 9-volume edition of the complete works of R. Austin Freeman, including all the Thorndyke novels and short stories, with additional volumes of commentary and criticism. Volume 10 of the collection was a revised edition (1998) of In search of Dr. Thorndyke: The story of R. Austin Freeman's great scientific investigator and his creator (originally published 1971) by Norman Donaldson. Amazon released two volumes of electronic versions of "Dr. Thorndyke Mysteries Collection", each containing four of the original books. Delphi Classics have issued a Complete Works of R. Austin Freeman, but this is not for sale in the United States due to copyright reasons. Instead there is a Collected Works edition for the US market. Many of the Thorndyke stories are available on Project Gutenberg Australia.

1. The Case of Oscar Brodski (UK 01)
2. A Case of Premeditation (UK 02)
3. The Echo of a Mutiny (UK 03)
4. A Wastrel's Romance (UK 04)
5. The Missing Mortgagee (UK 05)
6. Percival Bland's Proxy (UK 06)
7. The Old Lag (UK 07)
8. The Stranger's Latchkey (UK 08)
9. The Anthropologist at Large (UK 09)
10. The Blue Sequin (UK 10)
11. The Moabite Cipher (UK 11)
12. The Mandarin's Pearl (omitted from British edition)
13. The Aluminium Dagger (UK 12)
14. The Magic Casket (UK 13)
15. The Case of the White Footprints (UK 31)
16. The Blue Scarab (UK 32)
17. The New Jersey Sphinx (UK 33)
18. The Touchstone (UK 34)
19. A Fisher of Men (UK 35)
20. The Stolen Ingots (UK 36)
21. The Funeral Pyre (UK 37)
22. The Puzzle Lock (UK 22)
23. The Green Check Jacket (UK 23)
24. The Seal of Nebuchadnezzar (UK 24)
25. Phyllis Annesley's Peril (UK 25)
26. A Sower of Pestilence (UK 26)
27. Rex v. Burnaby (UK 27)
28. A Mystery of the Sand-hills (UK 28)
29. The Apparition of Burling Court (UK 29)
30. The Mysterious Visitor (UK 30)
31. The Contents of a Mare's Nest (UK 14)
32. The Stalking Horse (UK 15)
33. The Naturalist at Law (UK 16)
34. Mr. Ponting's Alibi (UK 17)
35. Pandora's Box (UK 18)
36. The Trail of Behemoth (UK 19)
37. The Pathologist to the Rescue (UK 20)
38. Gleanings from the Wreckage (UK 21)
39. The Man with the Nailed Shoes (omitted from both omnibus editions)
40. A Message from the Deep Sea (omitted from both omnibus editions)

=== Example of the illustration of a Dr Thorndyke book ===
John Thorndyke's cases, supposedly related by Christopher Jervis and edited by Richard Austin Freeman first appeared as serial stories in Pearson's Magazine in 1908. The first story was The Blue Sequin which appeared in the Christmas double number of the magazine in December 1908. The stories were illustrated by H. M. Brock with both pen and ink drawings and colour wash drawings (in black and white), as well as photographs showing the evidence in the cases. The stories were published as a book by Chatto and Windus in late 1909. It is not clear whether or not this edition of the book was illustrated, but the later 1916 edition certainly was. However, the book had far fewer illustrations than the magazines, with only the six drawings by H. M. Brock shown here and only nine photographs.

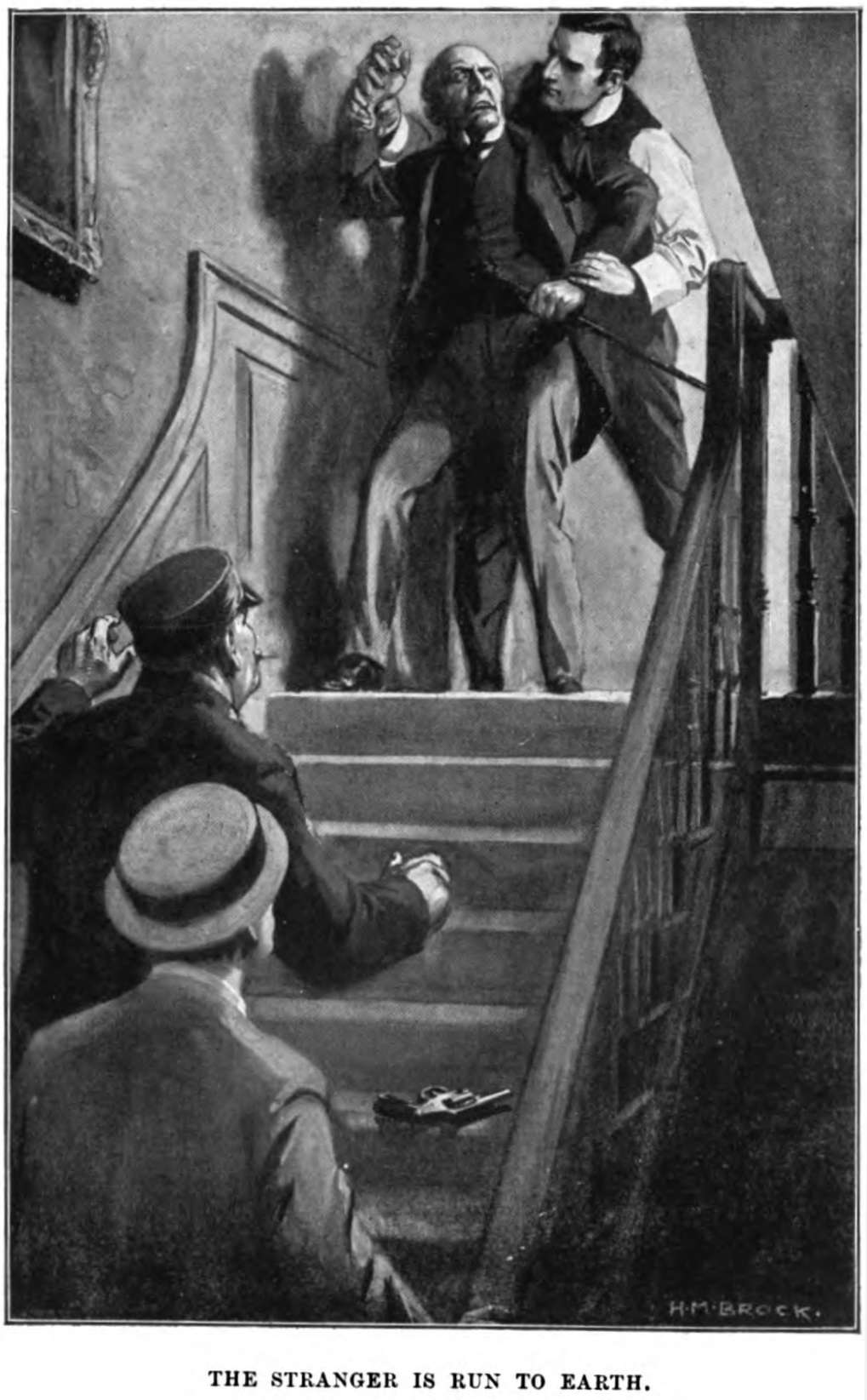
Thorndyke tackles the gunman

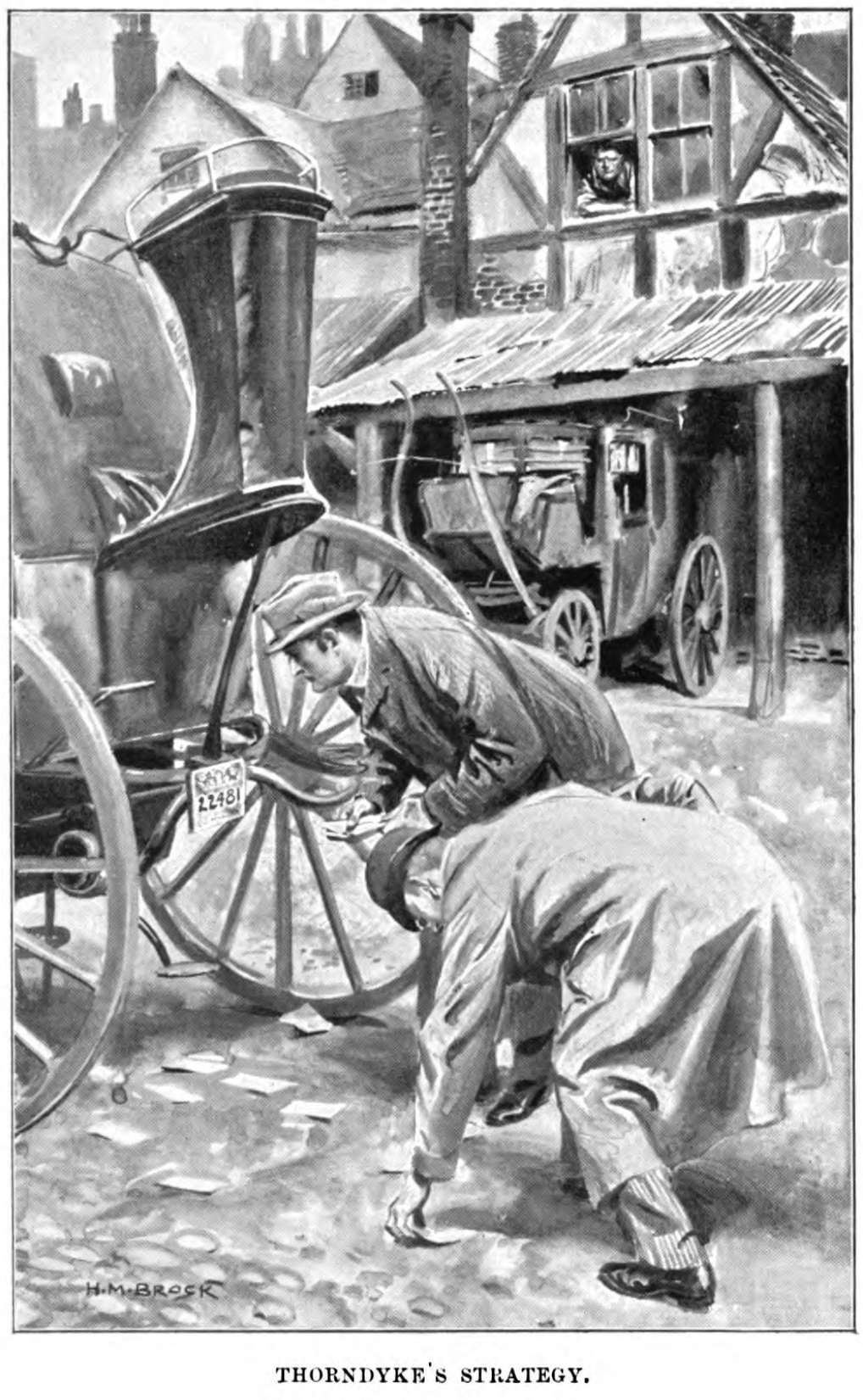
Thorndyke and Jervis examine the carriage

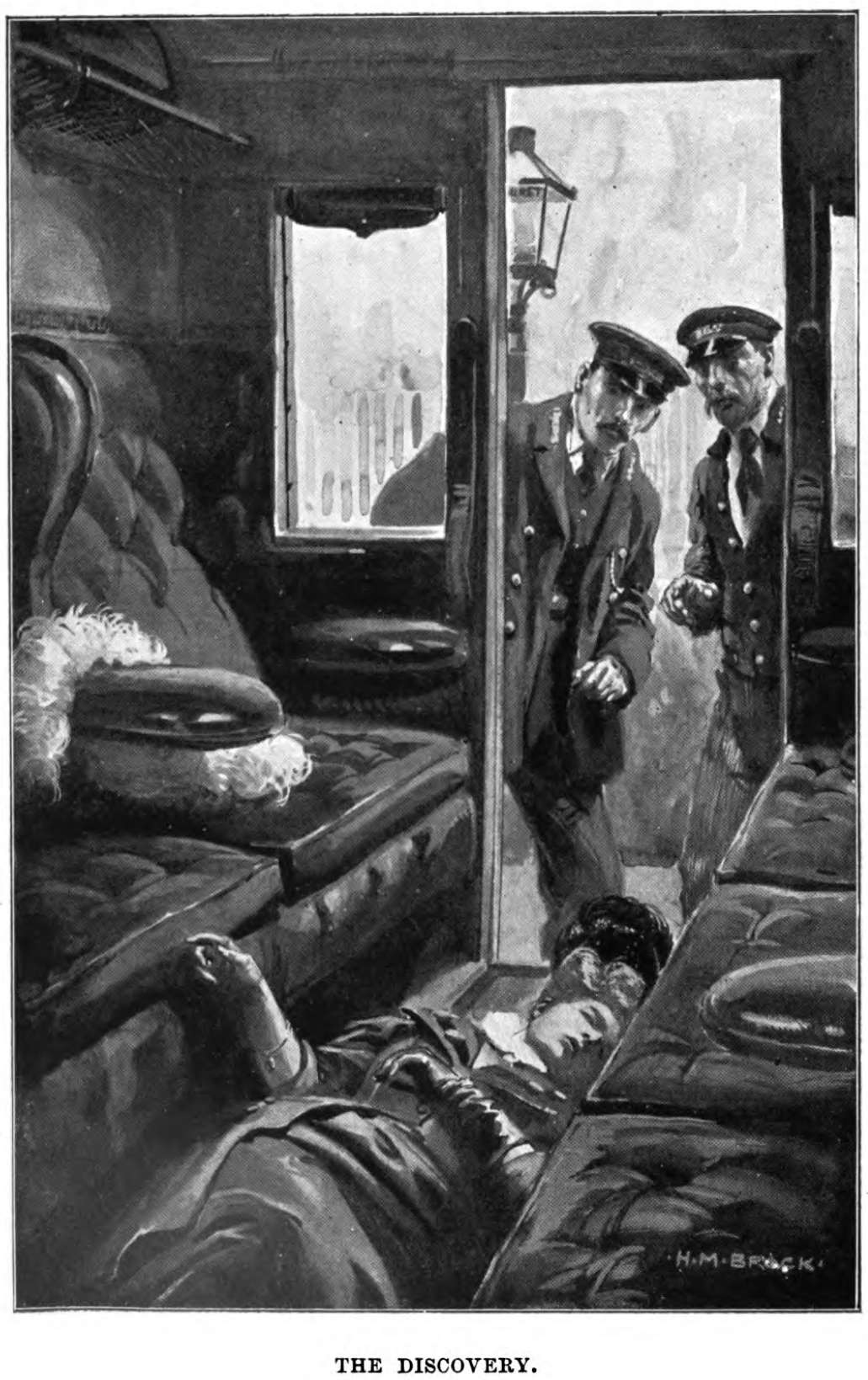
The railway staff find a dead body

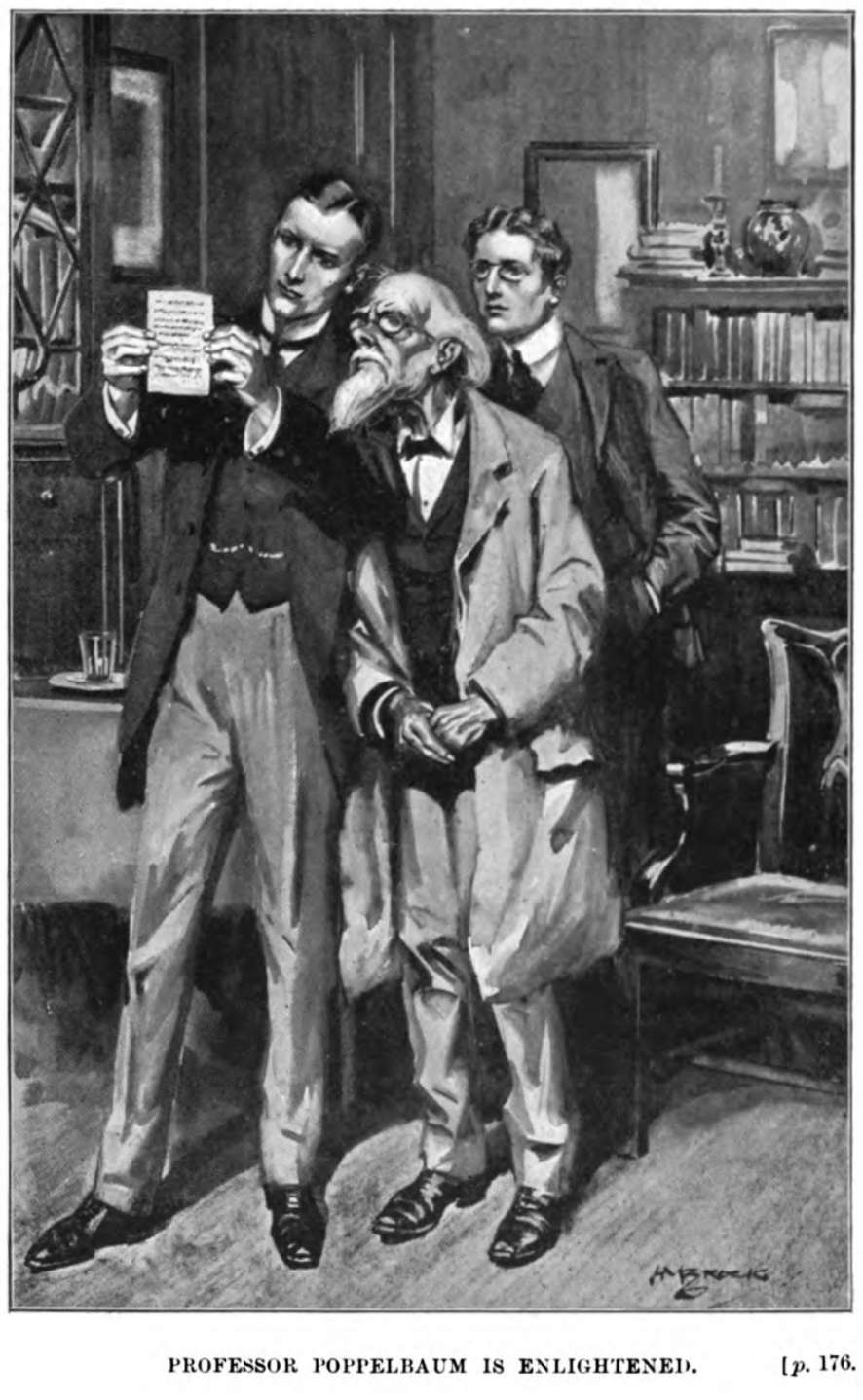
Thorndyke explains the puzzle to the professor

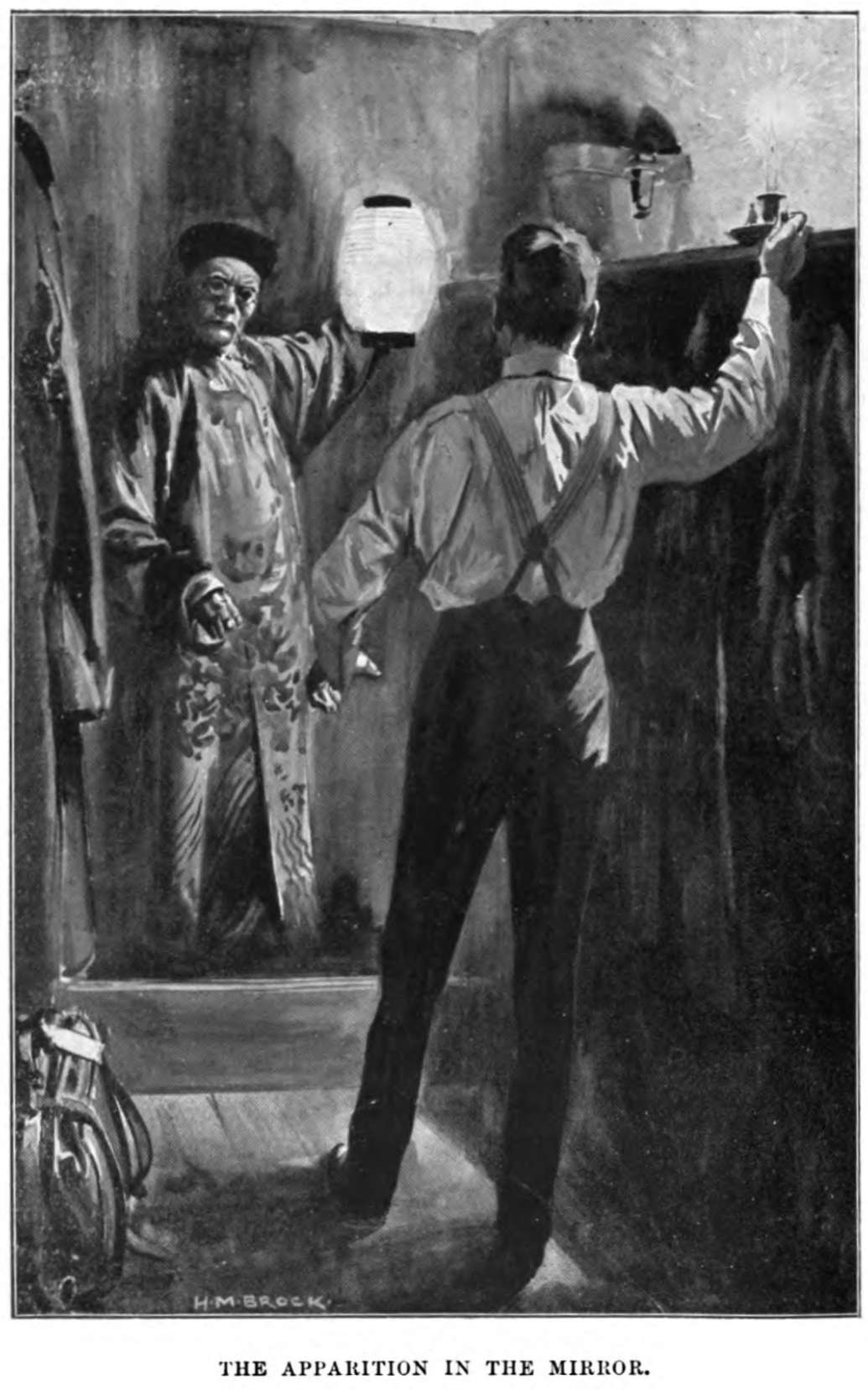
He sees a mandarin in the mirror

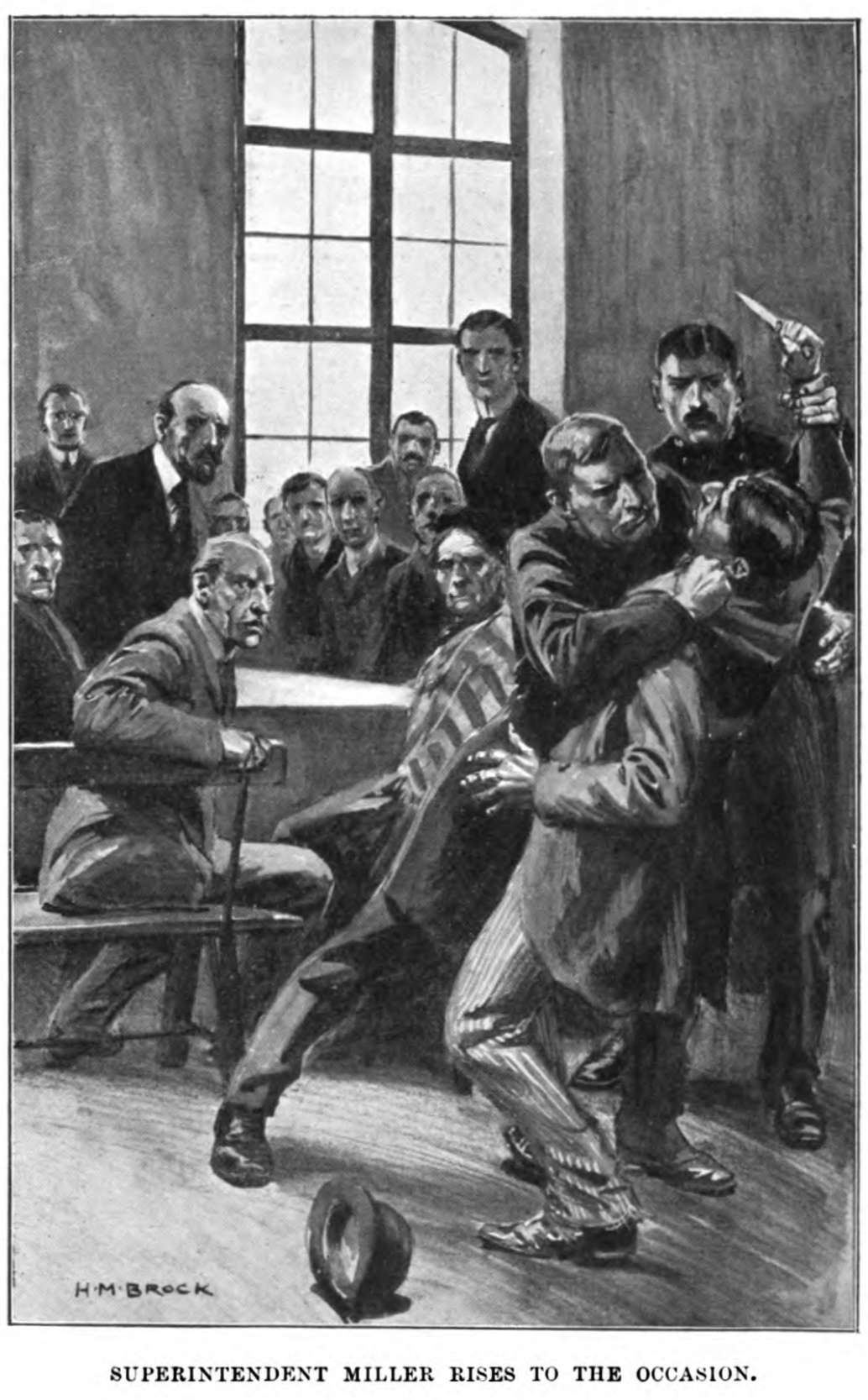
Inspector Miller tackles the knife-wielding assailant

== Adaptations ==
=== Television adaptations ===
A short series featuring Dr. Thorndyke was produced by the BBC in 1964, entitled Thorndyke. The title character was played by Peter Copley.

Based on the stories written by R. Austin Freeman, the episodes, all of which except the pilot are missing from the BBC archive, were as follows:

- "The Case of Oscar Brodski" (Pilot — as part of BBC series Detective)
- "The Old Lag"
- "A Case of Premeditation"
- "The Mysterious Visitor"
- "The Case of Phyllis Annesley" (adapted from 'Phyllis Annesley's Peril')
- "Percival Bland's Brother" (adapted from 'Percival Bland's Proxy')
- "The Puzzle Lock"

Two stories were also adapted as part of the Thames TV series The Rivals of Sherlock Holmes, in 1971–3. These were:

- "A Message from the Deep Sea" (from the first series and starring John Neville as Thorndyke)
- "The Moabite Cipher" (from the second series and starring Barrie Ingham as Thorndyke)

Both series are available on DVD: in the UK from Network Video and in the US from Acornmedia.

=== Radio adaptations ===
On June 9, 1962, Mollie Hardwick adapted Dr. Thorndyke Intervenes as The Corpse in the Case on Saturday Night Theatre for the BBC Home Service. It starred Cyril Luckham as Dr. Thorndyke, Arthur Gomez as Mr. Brodribb and Leslie Perrins as Supt. Miller. The archive status of this programme is unknown.

On September 14, 1963, Mollie Hardwick adapted Mr. Pottermack's Oversight on Saturday Night Theatre for the BBC Home Service in the series Murder for Pleasure. Anthony Nicholls played Thorndyke. The programme still exists in the BBC archives.

Starting in 2011, the BBC aired radio adaptations of some of the Thorndyke short stories, Thorndyke: Forensic Investigator on BBC Radio 4 Extra.

==== Series 1 ====
November 2011 read by Jim Norton

- A Mysterious Visitor
- The Puzzle Lock
- A Mystery of the Sand Hills
- Pathologist to the Rescue
- The Secret of the Urn
- Pandora's Box

==== Series 2 ====
March 2013 read by William Gaminara

- The Stolen Ingots
- Rex v Burnaby
- The Stalking Horse

In January 2015, Tim McInnerny played Dr. Thorndyke opposite James Fleet's Inspector Lestrade in Chris Harrald's adaptation of "The Moabite Cipher" in the third series of the BBC Radio 4 series The Rivals.

== Compilations ==
Starting in 2018 and completed in 2021, editor David Marcum brought together the entire Thorndyke collection - much of which has been very difficult to obtain for fans. 21 novels and over 40 short stories are contained in nine volumes.

== See also ==
- List of fictional medical examiners
