= Mr. Pottermack's Oversight =

1930 novel

- Author: R. Austin Freeman
- Language: English
- Series: Doctor Thorndyke
- Genre: Detective
- Publisher: Hodder and Stoughton; Dodd, Mead (US)
- Publication date: 1930
- Publication place: United Kingdom
- Media type: Print
- Preceded by: As a Thief in the Night
- Followed by: Pontifex, Son and Thorndyke
- Text: Mr. Pottermack's Oversight at Wikisource

Mr. Pottermack's Oversight is a 1930 detective story by the British author R. Austin Freeman. Part of his long-running series of novels featuring the forensic investigator Doctor Thorndyke, it was published in London by Hodder and Stoughton and in New York City by Dodd, Mead. Freeman's Thorndyke stories stretched back to the Edwardian era, but this novel was released during the Golden Age of Detective Fiction. It is an inverted detective story in which the crime is shown early on and the preparator clearly shown. It was republished in 2024 as part of the British Library's Crime Classics series.

== Synopsis ==
Mr. Pottermack, a respectable man living in a house on the outskirts of the town of Borley in Buckinghamshire, is confronted one night by his repeated blackmailer James Lewson a local bank manager. When Pottermack refuses to pay Lewson turns nasty and in the subsequent brawl he falls down the disused garden well which Pottermack had recently uncovered while digging to prepare for the installation of an antique sundial to sit in the grounds. Pottmerack an enterprising man, realises that the sandy soil means that Lawson's footprints are clearly shown all the way from the town to his house. He develops a mould imitating the soles of the dead mans shoes and wears them to walk some distance away to an isolated heath. Meanwhile, the sundial is installed over the top of the well.

Pottermack believes he has thrown any potential supsicion way from him. However he is unsettled when he encounters Doctor Thorndyke who is following up the case out of interest after it is mentioned by a friend. Yet the Doctor, despite his curiosity and observations, seemingly disappears from the case. To convince the wider public that Lewson is alive and has likely fled the country, Pottermack takes the banknotes Lewson had embezzled from his branch and tries to have his pocket picked at a horseracing meeting in Surrey but - having been too clever for his own good - he is almost arrested while he has the incriminating money on him.

Pottermack reminisces about his history. He had been a young bank cashier named Jeffrey Brandon, engaged to his soulmate, who was wrongly accused of stealing and had been sent to prison for five years. Unable to stand the injustice he had managed to escape and it was wrongly supposed he had drowned while trying to swim out to a ship. Instead he had managed to slip away to the United States where hardwork earned him a significant sum of money. He returned to England using an alias based on the ship he had sailed to America on the Potomac. On his return he courted the fiancée he had been torn from by his imprisonment who he believes was a widow. He is also discovered by his old associate Lewson who proceeded to blackmail him to feed his own gambling habit. Only after Lewson's death in the well (which only Pottermack knows of) does he discover that she is married to him. She wishes she could marry him but she can't. She also reveals that Lewson had deliberately framed him for his own crime. Unspoken is the suggestion that she knows Pottermack's real identity, but maintains the fiction that they are new acquittances.

Having escape from detection of the initial killing, Pottermack now realises he has to provide a body that will satisfy the world Lewson is dead so he can marry his sweetheart. In London one day he chances across an Egyptian mummy in an auction. Purchasing it he does everything he can to indicate it is Lewson's corpse and then dumps it in a nearby gravel quarry dressed in the dead man's clothes. The body is discovered several months later by workmen and an inquest is called. Pottermack is disturbed when he encounters Thorndyke at the inquest. The Doctor alone quickly works out that the corpse is a mummy over two thousand years old but says nothing. The inquest concludes that it is the corpse of Lewson and declares it an accident.

In the privacy of Pottermack's garden Thorndyke indicates that he has worked out the entire deception. However his sense of justice from the fact that Pottermack had been wrongly convicted means he will let sleeping dogs lie. Pottermack, impressed by Thorndyke's incredible deductions, is now free to marry his sweetheart.

== Bibliography ==
- Hubin, Allen J. Crime Fiction, 1749-1980: A Comprehensive Bibliography. Garland Publishing, 1984.
- Magill, Frank Northen. Critical Survey of Mystery and Detective Fiction: Authors, Volume 1. Salem Press, 1988.
- Reilly, John M. Twentieth Century Crime & Mystery Writers. Springer, 2015.
- Zi-Ling, Yan. Economic Investigations in Twentieth-Century Detective Fiction: Expenditure, Labor, Value. Ashgate Publishing, 2015.
