= The Maggies, Magazine Cover Awards =

The Maggies is a national poll to celebrate and award the best magazine covers of the past year. Initiated by online magazine and newspaper subscription company, iSUBSCRiBE, The Maggies aim to raise the profile of the entire magazine industry.

Originally started in the UK in September 2009, the Maggie Awards were also launched in Australia and New Zealand in June 2010. The Maggies recognize those covers that resonate most strongly with the general public, encapsulate the passion of the subject matter, capture the spirit of the previous year and provoke the most debate.

Hello! magazine in the UK referred to the Awards as “...the magazine industry’s answer to The Oscars.”

A panel of magazine industry heavyweights are picked for the panel of judges who shortlist the nominated covers, selecting five titles per category, which are then put to public vote via The Maggies website.

== Past Magazine Cover of the Year Winners ==
Q magazine featuring Lily Allen and a couple of black panthers was crowned Magazine Cover of the Year in the inaugural awards in the UK. The 2010 awards saw 8 category winners and one overall winner, with the September 2009 issue of GQ taking this honour, with a seductive image of Sienna Miller on the cover.

== Past Category Winners ==
Category	2010	2009
Best Entertainment Cover	Metal Hammer, Dec, 2009	Q, April, 2009
Best Fashion Cover	GQ, Sept, 2009	Love, Feb, 2009
Best Lifestyle Cover	FHM, Oct, 2009	Clash, April, 2009
Best Specialist Cover	New Scientist, Dec 5, 2009	BBC History, Nov, 2008
Best Sports Cover	Whitelines, January 2009	Huck, June, 2009
Best Technology Cover	Wired, June, 2009	N/A
Best Trade Cover	Marketing Week, Dec 10, 2009	Geographical, Jan, 2009
Best Youth Cover	Beano, Oct, 2009	N/A
