= Shafta Awards (journalism) =

The Shafta Awards are British awards given annually for "the very worst in tabloid journalism". They were established in 1987 following a Daily Star story "Princess Margaret to appear in Crossroads" by Geoff Baker and Pat Codd, in honour of which they are also known as the "Princess Margaret Awards". The Guardian wrote in 2008 that "Shaftas host Johnny Vaughan often sums up the awards' ethos by quoting a tabloid journalist who once told a colleague: 'Fuck the facts, just quote a friend - the pub's open in 10 minutes.'" Piers Morgan, winner of a lifetime achievement Shafta in 2005, described the awards as "celebrat[ing] what I believe to be the very essence of Fleet Street: the regular ability of adult, intelligent, well-educated, street-smart journalists to behave like complete and utter numbskulls." The awards were originally little more than a meeting in a pub, and were not held between 1997 and 2001, when they were revived by The People's showbiz editor Sean O'Brien.

Winners include Sean Hoare and Piers Morgan, winning lifetime achievement Shaftas in 2004 and 2005 respectively. James Desborough also won the ""can we hear the tape?" award for verbatim quotes" in 2002 for an interview with George Martin that Salon.com alleged included a fabricated quote.
