= Scottish Press Awards =

Annual ceremony

The Scottish Press Awards is an annual ceremony which recognises talent in Scottish journalism. The ceremony was established by the Scottish Newspaper Society (SNS), which "represents, protects, and promotes" Scotland's newspaper industry, in 1979.

== See also ==
- British Press Awards
- List of British journalism awards
