= 1967 Birthday Honours =

British government recognitions

The Queen's Birthday Honours 1967 were appointments by many of the Commonwealth realms of Queen Elizabeth II to various orders and honours to reward and highlight good works by citizens of those countries, on the occasion of the official birthday of the Queen. They were announced in supplements to the London Gazette of 2 June 1967.

At this time honours for Australians were awarded both in the United Kingdom honours, on the advice of the premiers of Australian states, and also in a separate Australia honours list.

The recipients of honours are displayed here as they were styled before their new honour, and arranged by honour, with classes (Knight, Knight Grand Cross, etc.) and then divisions (Military, Civil, etc.) as appropriate.

== United Kingdom and Commonwealth ==
=== Life Peer ===
Baron

- Sir William John Carron, President, Amalgamated Engineering Union.
- Alderman Llewellyn Heycock, CBE, JP, DL, Chairman, Education Committee, Glamorgan County Council.
- Sir John Primatt Redcliffe Maud, GCB, CBE, Master of University College, Oxford.
- Sir William George Penney, KBE, Chairman, United Kingdom Atomic Energy Authority.

=== Privy Counsellor ===
- The Honourable Arthur Augustus Calwell, formerly Leader of the Federal Parliamentary Labour Party, Australia.
- Sir Dingle Mackintosh Foot, QC, MP, Solicitor-General since 1964.
- Eustace George Willis, MP, Minister of State, Scottish Office, 1964–1967.
- George Woodcock, CBE, General Secretary, Trades Union Congress.

=== Knight Bachelor ===
- Norris Montgomerie Agnew, CBE, lately Chairman, Board of Governors, United Manchester Hospitals.
- Peter Christopher Allen, Chairman, Committee for Exports to Canada, British National Export Council.
- Professor John Henry Biggart, CBE, MD, FRCP, Dean of the Faculty of Medicine, Queen's University, Belfast.
- Herbert Vernon Bonar, CBE, Chairman and Managing Director, Low & Bonar Group Ltd., Dundee.
- Frederick Herbert Stanley Brown, CBE, Chairman, Central Electricity Generating Board.
- Major-General Charles James George Dalton, CB, CBE, Controller, Zoological Society of London.
- Paul Christopher Davie, Remembrancer of the City of London.
- Clifford Alfred Dove, CBE, ERD, Director-General, Mersey Docks and Harbour Board.
- Donald Keith Falkner, Director, Royal College of Music.
- David Henry Follett, Director and Secretary, Science Museum.
- Frederick Gibberd, CBE, Architect.
- John Layton Jarvis. For services to Horse Racing.
- Edward Martin Furnival Jones, CBE. Attached Ministry of Defence.
- Cecil Mead, lately Chairman and Chief Executive, International Computers and Tabulators Ltd. For services to Export.
- Oswald Bernard Miller, Chairman, John Lewis Partnership Ltd.
- Walter Thomas Monnington, President, Royal Academy of Arts.
- Professor Ronald Sydney Nyholm, Head of Department of Chemistry, University College, London.
- George Reginald Pope. For services to newspaper management.
- Paul Reilly, Director, Council of Industrial Design.
- William Rendell, General Manager, Commonwealth Development Corporation.
- John Eric Richardson, CBE, Director of Education, The Polytechnic, London.
- William Robert Richardson, Editor, Sunday Citizen and Reynold's News.
- Ashton Wentworth Roskill, QC. Chairman, Monopolies Commission.
- Robert James Sainsbury. For services to the Arts.
- Charles Hilary Scott, President, The Law Society. Chairman, National Film Finance Corporation.
- George Edward Scott, CBE, Chief Constable, West Riding of Yorkshire Constabulary.
- Alderman Frank Augustus Small, CBE, DL, lately Chairman (now Vice-Chairman), Nottinghamshire County Council.
- Walter Richard Trehane, Chairman, Milk Marketing Board for England and Wales.
- Aubrey Ernest Ward, JP, DL, Chairman, Buckinghamshire County Council.
- Leslie Hugh Wilson, OBE, Architect and Planning Consultant.
- Charles Maurice Yonge, CBE, President, Scottish Marine Biological Association.

Diplomatic Service and Overseas List

- Frederick Joseph Clarke, LRCP, LRCS(Ed), Governor, Saint Lucia.
- Wilfred Ebenezer Jacobs, OBE, QC, Governor, Antigua.
- John Valentine Jardine Paterson, British Subject resident in India.
- Fred Albert Phillips, CVO, Governor, Saint Christopher-Nevis-Anguilla.

State of New South Wales

- John Cadwallader. For services to commerce.
- His Honour Judge Adrian Herbert Curlewis, CBE. For services to the community.
- Frank Schofield McDowell. For services to the community.

State of Victoria

- The Honourable John Stoughton Bloomfield, QC, lately Minister of Education.
- James Alexander Forrest. For services to the community.
- The Honourable Ronald William Mack, President, Legislative Council of Victoria.

State of Queensland

- George Read Fisher, CMG. For services to the Australian mining and metallurgical industries.

State of Western Australia

- Claude Hotchin, OBE. For services to art in the State of Western Australia.

State of Tasmania

- Basil Osborne, CBE, Lord Mayor of Hobart.

=== Order of the Bath ===
==== Knight Grand Cross of the Order of the Bath (GCB) ====
Military Division

- General Sir John Hackett, KCB, CBE, DSO, MC, Honorary Colonel, 10th (Volunteer) Battalion, The Parachute Regiment.

Civil Division

- Sir Richard Royle Powell, KCB, KBE, CMG, Permanent Secretary, Board of Trade.

==== Knight Commander of the Order of the Bath (KCB) ====
Military Division

- Vice Admiral John Osler Chattock Hayes, CB, OBE.
- Lieutenant-General Derek Boileau Lang, CB, DSO, MC, late Infantry.
- Lieutenant-General Thomas Cecil Hook Pearson, CB, CBE, DSO, late Infantry.
- Acting Air Marshal Edward Gordon Jones, CB, CBE, DSO, DFC, Royal Air Force.

Civil Division

- Denis Charles Barnes, CB, Permanent Secretary, Ministry of Labour.

==== Companion of the Order of the Bath (CB) ====
Military Division
Royal Navy

- Rear Admiral John Harold Adams, MVO.
- Rear Admiral Anthony Templer Frederick Griffith Griffin.
- Rear Admiral David Walter Kirke, CBE.
- Rear Admiral Patrick John Morgan, DSC.
- Rear Admiral Richard Collings Paige.
- Rear Admiral Edmond Nicholas Poland, CBE.
- Rear Admiral George Stephen Ritchie, DSC.
- Rear Admiral Ottaker Harold Moimir St John Steiner.
- Rear Admiral Cyril Hubert Surtees Wise, MBE.

Army

- Major-General William Douglas Elmes Brown, CBE, DSO, (62507), late Royal Regiment of Artillery.
- Major-General Ian Rollo Graeme, OBE, (56580), late Royal Regiment of Artillery.
- Major-General John Harington, OBE, (58011), late Royal Regiment of Artillery.
- Major-General Henry Anthony Lascelles, CBE, DSO, (52026), late Royal Armoured Corps (R.A.R.O.)
- Major-General John Sheffield, CBE, (47645), Royal Army Ordnance Corps (now retired).
- Major-General John Bramley Malet Sloane, CBE, (137940), late Infantry.
- Major-General Harry Stewart Wood, TD, (70610), late Royal Regiment of Artillery (R.A.R.O.)

Royal Air Force

- Air Vice-Marshal William Daniel Disbrey, CBE, AFC.
- Air Vice-Marshal Alan Donald Frank, CBE, DSO, DFC.
- Air Vice-Marshal Harold Keggin, CBE, QHDS, LDS.
- Air Commodore John Alexander Carlisle Aiken.
- Air Commodore Jeaffreson Herbert Greswell, CBE, DSC, DFC.
- Air Commodore Ronald George Knott, DSO, DFC, AFC.
- Air Commodore Peter Henry Roscoe.
- Air Commodore Edmund Arthur Stockwell.

Civil Division

- George Robert Downes, Director of Postal Services, General Post Office.
- John Francis Embling, Deputy Under-secretary of State, Department of Education and Science.
- Hugh Robert Macdonald Farmer, Clerk Administrator, House of Commons Services.
- Christopher Willoughby Jardine, Under-Secretary, Board of Trade.
- Gerard Hamilton McConnell, Assistant Under-Secretary of State, Home Office.
- Stephen Snow Menneer, Under-Secretary, Ministry of Social Security.
- Derek Jack Mitchell, CVO, Deputy Under-Secretary of State, Department of Economic Affairs.
- Nicholas Godfrey Morrison, Assistant Under-Secretary of State, Ministry of Defence.
- William Henry Penley, CBE, Deputy Controller of Electronics, Ministry of Technology.
- Idwal Vaughan Pugh, Deputy Secretary, Ministry of Housing and Local Government.
- Herbert Hugh Rutter, lately Principal Assistant Solicitor, Ministry of Agriculture, Fisheries and Food.
- Anthony Nathaniel Stainton, Parliamentary Counsel to HM Treasury.
- Daniel Stewart Watson, OBE, Chief Scientific Officer, Ministry of Defence (Royal Navy).
- William Lawrence Wilson, OBE, Chief Mechanical and Electrical Engineer, Ministry of Public Building and Works.

=== Order of Saint Michael and Saint George ===
==== Knight Grand Cross of the Order of St Michael and St George (GCMG) ====
- Sir Charles Arthur Evelyn Shuckburgh, KCMG, CB, Her Majesty's Ambassador Extraordinary and Plenipotentiary at Rome.

==== Knight Commander of the Order of St Michael and St George (KCMG) ====
- Dawson Donaldson, Chairman, Commonwealth Telecommunications Board.
- John Melior Stevens, DSO, OBE, TD, Economic Minister and Head of the U.K. Treasury and Supply Delegation, Washington.

Diplomatic Service and Overseas List

- Robert Birley, CMG, for international services to education.
- Denis Arthur Greenhill, CMG, OBE, Deputy Under-Secretary of State, Foreign Office.
- Leonard Hooper, CMG, CBE, Director, Government Communications Headquarters.
- Noel Duncan Watson, CMG, lately Commonwealth Office.

==== Companion of the Order of St Michael and St George (CMG) ====
Members of the Third Class, or Companions, of the Most Distinguished Order

- Roy Arthur Odell Bridge, Adviser to the Governor of the Bank of England.
- Herbert Aubrey Cole, Director of Fisheries Research, Ministry of Agriculture, Fisheries and Food.
- William Buller Fagg, Deputy Keeper, Department of Ethnography, British Museum.
- The Honourable William Fraser, OBE, TD. A Managing Director, British Petroleum Company Limited.
- Walter Wynne Mason, MC, Director of External Relations and Records, Commonwealth War Graves Commission.
- Raymond Spencer Millard, Deputy Director, Road Research Laboratory, Ministry of Transport.
- Brigadier Ernest Cecil Pepper, CBE, DSO, DL, lately Warden of London House.
- Arthur Gerald Touch, Government Communications Headquarters.
- Arthur John Wilton, MC, Deputy High Commissioner, Aden.

Diplomatic Service and Overseas List

- Christopher Francis Robert Barclay, Foreign Office.
- David Vere Bendall, MBE, Counsellor, Her Majesty's Embassy, Washington.
- Colonel Frederick Manus de Butts, OBE, Commander, Trucial Oman Scouts.
- Nigel David Clive, OBE, MC, TD, Foreign Office/Commonwealth Office.
- John Spencer Ritchie Duncan, MBE, Diplomatic Service Administration Office.
- Stewart Leslie Edwards, Minister (Economic) Her Majesty's Embassy, Bonn.
- Joseph Stanley Ellis, OBE, Commonwealth Office.
- Horace James Fitzpatrick, CBE, lately Chairman, Currency and Exchange Board, Bermuda.
- Arthur Temple Franks, Foreign Office.
- Christopher Martin Pirie-Gordon, OBE, Her Majesty's Consul, Florence.
- James Dennis Greig, Financial Secretary, Mauritius.
- Robert Douglas Christopher McAlpine, Counsellor, Her Majesty's Embassy, Mexico City.
- Theophilus Peters, Counsellor (Commercial) Her Majesty's Embassy, Peking.
- Clive Martin Rose, Counsellor (Commercial) Her Majesty's Embassy, Paris.
- Norman Statham, Foreign Office.
- John Debenham Taylor, OBE, Foreign Office.

State of New South Wales

- Alexis François Albert, VRD, For services to the community especially to the blind.

State of Victoria

- Ian Francis Beaurepaire, Lord Mayor of Melbourne.

State of Queensland

- Harold Garfield Behan, MBE, For services in the field of local government and to the welfare of the grazing industry.

State of South Australia

- Gilbert Frederick Seaman, Under Treasurer for the State of South Australia.

=== Royal Victorian Order ===
==== Knight Grand Cross of the Royal Victorian Order (GCVO) ====
- Sir Thomas Innes of Learney, KCVO.

==== Knight Commander of the Royal Victorian Order (KCVO) ====
- Major-General Edmund Hakewill Smith, CB, CBE, MC.
- John Valentine Meech, CVO.

==== Commander of the Royal Victorian Order (CVO) ====
- Major Sir Ralph Hugo Anstruther, Bt., MC.
- Robert Alexander Forrester.
- Major The Honourable Francis Michael Legh, MVO.
- Neville Egerton Leigh.
- Major James Rennie Maudslay, MVO, MBE.
- Henry George Pinnock, MVO.
- Major-General Hervey Degge Wilmot Sitwell, CB, MC.
- Sir Richard Snedden, CBE.

==== Member of the Royal Victorian Order (MVO) ====
At this time the two lowest classes of the Royal Victorian Order were "Member (fourth class)" and "Member (fifth class)", both with post-nominal letters MVO. "Member (fourth class)" was renamed "Lieutenant" (LVO) from the 1985 New Year Honours onwards.

Fourth Class

- Major Simon Claud Michael Bland.
- Commander Ian Rodney Bowden, Royal Navy.
- Colin Gilbraith.
- Major Arthur John Stewart Griffin.
- Bernard John Hesketh.
- Commander John Leonard Lees, Royal Navy.
- Olive Margaret Short, MVO.

Fifth Class

- Ernest William Cave.
- Sydney Samuel Haimes.
- Wing Commander Eric Edward Lake (187162), Royal Air Force.
- Roger Ivan Mutimer.
- George Jamieson Thomson.

==== Medal of the Royal Victorian Order (RVM) ====
In Silver

- Irene Ida Anthony.
- Edward George Bailey.
- Frank Bentley.
- Chief Shipwright Artificer Arthur Owen Brown, P/MX 77832.
- Walter Collier.
- Robert Davies.
- Chief Petty Officer William Anthony Dobson, P/JX 712999.
- John Samuel Gray.
- Alfred Harwood.
- Mary Emma Jones.
- Henry Thomas Mitchell.
- Stanley Wilfred Roblou.
- Cyril Simkins.
- Yeoman Bed Hanger John Edward Tomkins, Her Majesty's Bodyguard of the Yeomen of the Guard.
- Florence Wade.
- James Young.

=== Order of the British Empire ===
==== Knight Grand Cross of the Order of the British Empire (GBE) ====
Military Division

- General Sir John Anderson, KCB, CBE, DSO, ADC(Gen.), (42399), Colonel, 5th Inniskilling Dragoon Guards, Colonel Commandant, Royal Army Educational Corps.

Civil Division

- Sir Robert Ian Bellinger, Lord Mayor of London.

==== Dame Commander of the Order of the British Empire (DBE) ====
Military Division

- Air Commandant Pauline Giles, RRC, QHNS, Princess Mary's Royal Air Force Nursing Service.

Civil Division

- Margery Irene Corbett Ashby, Honorary President, International Alliance of Women. Honorary President, British Commonwealth League.
- The Right Honourable Marjorie Minna, Countess of Brecknock, Superintendent-in-Chief, St John Ambulance Brigade.
- Beryl Paston Brown, Principal, Homerton College of Education, Cambridge.
- Ivy Compton-Burnett, CBE, Writer.
- Gladys Constance Cooper (Mrs Merivale), Actress.
- Helen Louise Gardner, CBE, Merton Professor of English Literature, University of Oxford.

==== Knight Commander of the Order of the British Empire (KBE) ====
Military Division

- Vice Admiral John Michael Dudgeon Gray, CB, OBE.
- Vice Admiral Horace Collier Lyddon, CB, OBE.
- Major-General Raymond Douglas Coate, CB, (41435), Royal Army Pay Corps.
- Air Marshal George Roy Gunn, CB, OBE, QHP, MB, ChB, Royal Air Force.

Civil Division

- Professor Hedley John Barnard Atkins, DM, FRCS, President, Royal College of Surgeons of England.
- Cecil Joseph Bateman, MBE, Permanent Secretary, Ministry of Finance, Northern Ireland and Head of the Northern Ireland Civil Service.
- Arthur James Stephen Brown, President, Confederation of British Industry.

State of Queensland

- The Honourable William George Albert Mack, Chief Justice of the State of Queensland.

==== Commander of the Order of the British Empire (CBE) ====
Military Division
Royal Navy

- Surgeon Captain Hugh Latimer Cleave, OBE, FRCS (Eng), (now Retired).
- Commodore Kenneth Arthur Gadd, DSC, RD**, Royal Naval Reserve.
- Captain Kenneth Roy Hickson, AFC*.
- Captain Desmond Bernard Law, MBE, DSC, (now Retired).
- Captain Iwan Geoffrey Raikes, DSC.
- Captain George Robson, Royal Fleet Auxiliary Service.
- The Reverend Richard Gwilym Williams, OBE, QHC.

Army

- Colonel (acting) David Ion Leslie Beath, TD, (26760), Army Cadet Force.
- Colonel Gordon John Alistair Dewar, MBE, (67154), late Infantry, formerly Commander, British Forces, Guyana.
- Colonel Roy Ditley Norwood Fabricius, TD, DL, (300801), formerly Staff, Territorial Army (R.A.R.O.)
- Colonel Jocelyn Fisher (239541), Women's Royal Army Corps.
- Brigadier John Collett Govier (210159), Royal Army Ordnance Corps.
- Brigadier Richard Frank Bradshaw Hensman, OBE, ADC, (66096), late Infantry.
- Brigadier Richard Clement Paul Jefferies, MBE, (124516), late Infantry.
- Brigadier Colin David Stuart Kennedy (63505), late Royal Regiment of Artillery.
- Colonel Edward Raymond Lewis, OBE, (68108), late Royal Regiment of Artillery.
- Brigadier Kenneth Philip Molyneux-Carter, OBE, MC, (56669), late Infantry.
- Brigadier Philip Kirshaw Rooke (151471), late Royal Regiment of Artillery.
- Brigadier Arthur Douglas Seton, MRCVS, (62248), late Royal Army Veterinary Corps (now retired).
- Colonel Dudley Edwin Thornton, ERD, (72799), late Infantry, Commander, Malawi Army.
- Brigadier Paul Stanley Ward, OBE, (67956), late Infantry.

Royal Air Force

- Air Vice-Marshal Victor Charles Otter, OBE.
- Air Commodore Neil Cameron, DSO, DFC.
- Air Commodore Desmond Ernest Hawkins, DFC.
- Air Commodore Norman Walter Kearon, OBE.
- Air Commodore Duncan Frank Hyland-Smith, MVO, DFC, AFC.
- Air Commodore Robert Louis Soper, MRCS, LRCP.
- Group Captain Ernest Philip Appleton.
- Group Captain Frederick Samuel Hazlewood, OBE, AFC.
- Group Captain John Arthur George Jackson, DFC, AFC.
- Group Captain Charles Ernest Ness, OBE.
- Group Captain Ian Sargenson Stockwell, DFC, AFC. For services while on loan to the Kenya Air Force.

Civil Division

- Gerald Milton Abrahams, Chairman and Managing Director, Aquascutum Ltd. For services to Export.
- Joseph Addison, General Manager, Iranian Oil Participants, Ltd.
- Alfred Walter Henry Allen, General Secretary, Union of Shop, Distributive & Allied Workers.
- Richard Samuel Attenborough, Actor and Producer.
- Captain James Baird, Nautical Adviser to Furness Ship Management.
- Edgar Isaac Baker, HM Inspector of Schools, Department of Education and Science.
- Kenneth James Priestley Barraclough, OBE, TD, JP, Chairman, Poisons Board.
- Edgar Charles Beck, Chairman, John Mowlem & Company Ltd. For services to Export.
- John Barnard Blaikley, FRCS, FRCOG, Honorary Consultant Gynaecologist, The Queen Alexandra Military Hospital, Millbank.
- Robert Camm Booth, TD, Director, Birmingham Chamber of Commerce and Industry. For services to Export.
- Thomas Wilson Boyd, DSO, OBE. For services to the Trawler Fishing Industry.
- Robert Hunter Wingate Bruce. For services to the Highlands and Islands.
- Harold Jackson Burrows, MD, FRCS, Senior Surgeon in Orthopaedics, St. Bartholomew's Hospital, London.
- Charles Douglas Calverley. For services to the National Housebuilders Registration Council.
- Theodore Edward Chester, Professor of Social Administration, University of Manchester.
- Robert Clough, Director, Thomson Regional Newspapers Ltd, Newcastle upon Tyne.
- Oliver Cochran, OBE, Assistant Secretary, Board of Trade.
- Jack Antonio Coia. For services to Architecture.
- Cyril James Collinge, JP, Principal Chief Clerk, Inner London Magistrates' Courts.
- William Henry Basil Cotton, County Engineer and Surveyor, Durham County Council.
- Frederick Coutts, General of the Salvation Army.
- John Robert Coxon, JP, Alderman, Durham County Council.
- Sylvia Crowe, Landscape Architect.
- Harold Crowther, Director, Baker Perkins Holdings Ltd. For services to Export.
- Professor Emeritus William Edward Curtis, Senior Regional Scientific Adviser, Northern Civil Defence Region.
- William Aubrey Darlington, Drama Critic, The Daily Telegraph.
- Charles Samuel Darvill, Headmaster, Chaucer Comprehensive School, Sheffield.
- Richard William David, Secretary to the Syndics, Cambridge University Press.
- James Norman Davidson, MD, Gardiner Professor of Biochemistry, University of Glasgow.
- Alec Graeme Dickson, MBE, Founder, Voluntary Service Overseas and Community Service Volunteers.
- Antony Elliot Drake, OBE, Finance and Programmes Officer, United Kingdom Atomic Energy Authority, London.
- Henry Eason, JP, Secretary-General, Institute of Bankers.
- Captain Cyril Bentham Falls, Military Historian.
- Richard Lethbridge Hayne Farmer, JP, Chairman and Managing Director, Atlas Express Ltd.
- John Field, Assistant Director, Royal Ballet Company, Covent Garden.
- Alderman James Thomas Fletcher, JP, Chairman, North Riding of Yorkshire County Council.
- William Fox, Alderman, Kingston upon Hull City Council.
- Richard Harold Cottam Foxwell, Chairman, The Wayne, Kerr Company Ltd. For services to Export.
- Ivan Kenneth Fraser, Registrar of County Courts, Lord Chancellor's Department.
- William Thomas George Gates, Chairman, West Africa Committee.
- Arthur Havard Arnold Gem, OBE, MC, Deputy Chairman, Central Council of Physical Recreation.
- William Thomas Godber, Chairman, Bedfordshire Agricultural Executive Committee.
- Marian Minerva Hammond, JP, Headmistress, Exmouth Girls' County Secondary School, Devon.
- Leslie Henry Montague Hilliard, Alderman, London Borough of Hammersmith.
- The Reverend Canon Archibald Frederic Hood, Sub-Dean of the Most Excellent Order of the British Empire.
- Alfred William Ernest Houghton, Managing Director (Aircraft), British Aircraft Corporation (Weybridge) Ltd. For services to Export.
- Gilbert Adams Hunt, lately Managing Director, Massey Ferguson (U.K.) Ltd. For services to Export.
- Richard Irvin, Chairman, Richard Irvin & Sons Ltd.
- James Jack, JP, General Secretary, Scottish Trades Union Congress.
- John Angell James, MD, FRCS, lately Consultant Otologist, United Bristol Hospitals.
- David Karmel, QC, JP, Chairman, Committees of Investigation for Great Britain and for England and Wales.
- Emmanuel Kaye, Governing Director, Lansing Bagnall Ltd. For services to Export.
- John Cecil Kingsland, lately Headmaster, Cray Valley Technical High School.
- Donald Edward Knapman, Director, North Eastern Region, General Post Office.
- Philip Charles Fenner Lawton, DFC, Commercial and Sales Director, British European Airways.
- Leslie Ernest Laycock, OBE, Chairman, Leeds Regional Hospital Board.
- William Douglas Leckonby, Collector, London Port, Board of Customs and Excise.
- Professor Anthony Carey Lewis. For services to Music.
- Adrian Albert Lombard, Director of Engineering, Aero Division, Rolls-Royce Ltd. For services to Export.
- Professor John Loxham, Head of Department of Production and Industrial Administration, The College of Aeronautics, Cranfield.
- David McKenna, OBE, Chairman and General Manager, Southern Region of British Railways Board.
- Marcia Hopkins Mackie, OBE, Chairman, Northern Ireland Hospitals Authority.
- Angus Macleod, Procurator Fiscal of Edinburgh and Midlothian.
- John Denis Mahon, Art Historian.
- Sydney John Marks, TD, Chairman, Trebor Ltd. For services to Export.
- Henry John Marsh, Director-General, British Institute of Management.
- Lieutenant-Colonel Frederick Gordon Maxwell, TD, DL, Operating Manager (Railways), London Transport Board.
- James Gatherum Methven, lately Convener, Midlothian County Council.
- George Hoole Mitchell, Assistant Director for Scotland, Institute of Geological Sciences.
- Edward William Cowpe Pendleton, OBE, BEM, Chief Constable, Coventry City Police.
- James Philp, Director, National Vegetable Research Station.
- Frank Edward Price. For services to public authorities in Wales.
- Vanessa Redgrave, Actress.
- John Revans, MBE, MRCP, Senior Administrative Medical Officer, Wessex Regional Hospital Board.
- Robert Robertson, JP, Convener, Renfrewshire Education Committee.
- John Marshall Ross, MB, Principal Medical Officer, Ministry of Health.
- George Ronald Rougier, QC, Chairman, General Optical Council.
- Francis Edwin Prescott Sandilands, Chairman, British Insurance Association.
- Alfred Norman Schofield, Town Clerk, City of Southampton.
- Thomas Hugh Scrutton, Director, Walker Art Gallery, Liverpool.
- William James Sharps, OBE, Director of Communications, Foreign Office.
- Peter Malcolm Shepherd, Chairman, Wool Industry Training Board.
- Robert Simpson Silver, Professor of Mechanical Engineering, University of Glasgow.
- Heathcote Dicken Statham, lately Organist and Choirmaster, Norwich Cathedral.
- George Harold Sylvester, Chief Education Officer, Bristol.
- Robert Telford, Managing Director, Marconi. Company Ltd. For services to Export.
- Howard Thomas, Managing Director, A.B.C. Television Ltd.
- Clement John Tranter, OBE, Bashforth Professor of Mathematical Physics and Head of Mathematics and Ballistics Department, The Royal Military College of Science, Shrivenham.
- Edward Villiers Truefitt, Director of Scientific Research (Electronics), Ministry of Technology.
- William Trevor Vaughan, JP, Chairman, Newport Education Committee, Monmouthshire.
- Arthur Goronwy Watkins, MD, FRCP, Professor of Child Health, Welsh National School of Medicine.
- Alderman James William Whitworth, JP, lately General Secretary, Amalgamated Association of Operative Cotton Spinners & Twiners.
- Eric Leonard Wigham, Labour Correspondent, The Times.
- Albert Frederick Wilcox, OBE, Chief Constable, Hertfordshire Constabulary.
- Geoffrey Walford Wilks, TD, Chairman, Peter Brotherhood Ltd. For services to Export.
- George Ambler Wilson, Director of Engineering, Port of London Authority.
- Gerard Francis Young, JP. For services to University education.

Diplomatic Service and Overseas List

- The Honourable Mr. Justice Cecil Harry Andrew Bennett, QC, British Member of Arbitral Commission, Germany.
- Jan Eugenius van Berckel, President, British-Swiss Chamber of Commerce.
- Eric George Blandford, Puisne Judge, Aden.
- John Baptiste Bully, MBE, Chairman, Public Service Commission, and Chairman, Agricultural Marketing Board, Dominica.
- Reginald Arthur Close, OBE, British Council Representative, Greece.
- Henry Shillington Darling, Director of the Institute of Agricultural Research, Samaru, Nigeria.
- The Right Reverend Monsignor Charles Louis Alphonse Gachet, Bishop of Castries, Saint Lucia.
- Geoffrey Thomas Searle Hinton, First Secretary, Her Majesty's Embassy, Paris.
- Geoffrey Jonas Horsfall, Stipendiary Magistrate and Crown Attorney, Cayman Islands.
- Jerome Joseph Howard, Director of Public Works, Sarawak, Malaysia.
- Herbert Chiswell-Jones, OBE, British Subject lately resident in Italy.
- Frank Jesse White, Honorary Secretary, Merseyside Training Council Ltd.
- Kan Yuet-keung, OBE, JP. For public services in Hong Kong.
- John Richard Lewis, British Subject resident in Nigeria.
- Philip Wreaks Mason, British Subject resident in Japan.
- David MacKenzie Ogilvy, British Subject resident in the United States.
- Carmichael Charles Peter Pocock, British Subject resident in Venezuela.
- Charles Vincent Reade, DFC, British Subject resident in Brazil.
- Nigel Vernon Reed, MBE, TD, Senior Puisne Judge, Northern Region, Nigeria.
- Edward Trenton Richards. For public services in Bermuda.
- Philip Arthur Richardson, OBE, Permanent Secretary, Ministry of External Affairs, Malawi.
- Charles George Hanson Rodgers, lately Chief Engineer, East African Railways and Harbours.
- William John Peregrine Stallard Symes, lately Chief Engineer, Ministry of Works, Kenya.
- Charles Ian Turcan, British Subject resident in India.
- Commander Walter Edward Whitehead, OBE, Chairman, British Exports Marketing Advisory Committee, New York.

State of New South Wales

- Elton Reginald Griffin. For services to industry.
- Eric Walwyn Ormsby Martin. For services to local Government.

State of Victoria

- Thomas Edward Lowe, MD, FRCP. For services to medicine.

State of Queensland

- Neville Vicars Henderson. For outstanding services to the legal profession, and for philanthropic and community activities.
- Maldwyn Douglas Davies. For services to the community, particularly to industry and commerce.

State of South Australia

- Brigadier John Gilbert McKinna, DSO, MVO, ED, Commissioner of Police.

State of Tasmania

- Philip William Fletcher. For outstanding services as Commissioner of Police, particularly during the recent disastrous bush fires.
- Hugh Mervyn Murray. For services to the mining industry, and to the community.

==== Officer of the Order of the British Empire (OBE) ====
Military Division
Royal Navy

- Commander Edward Arbury Bennington.
- Commander Dermot Chenevix Coote.
- Commander Donald Evans.
- Commander William Hugh Field, DSC*.
- Commander Peter Harold Fradd.
- Commander Michael John Garnett.
- Commander Albert Charles Stephen Gower, DSM, (now Retired).
- Lieutenant Commander (Local Commander) Alexander Smith McDonald.
- Commander Charles David Vere Nicoll.
- Surgeon Commander Peter John Preston, MRCS, MRCP.
- Commander Reuben James Rawe, MBE, Nigerian Navy.
- Commander James Reid, Royal Naval Reserve.
- Instructor Commander Dennis Roe.
- Major (SD) Charles William Shand, BEM, Royal Marines.
- The Reverend Francis Robert Street.
- Commander Alistair Francis Colville Wemyss.
- Commander Charles Bernard Williams.

Army

- The Reverend William Theodore Armstrong (190346), Chaplain to the Forces, Second Class, lately Royal Army Chaplains' Department, Territorial Army.
- Colonel Kenneth Bullock (355416), Royal Army Ordnance Corps.
- Lieutenant-Colonel (acting) John Edgar Craig (343130), Combined Cadet Force.
- Colonel Charles Anthony Anson Crouch (125192), Corps of Royal Engineers.
- Major Ernest John Ewell, TD, MRCS, LRCP, (163704), Royal Army Medical Corps, Territorial Army (now retired).
- Colonel (Acting) Stephen Edward Montague Goodall, MBE, MC, (307718), Corps of Royal Engineers.
- Lieutenant-Colonel Harry Charles Stephen Gregory, MBE, (386003), 10th Princess Mary's Own Gurkha Rifles (Employed List 1).
- Lieutenant-Colonel Foster John Hornby (166948), Royal Regiment of Artillery.
- Lieutenant-Colonel (acting) William Farquhar Robbie Kydd (374268), Army Cadet Force.
- Lieutenant-Colonel Samuel Knox Lecky (370164), Corps of Royal Electrical and Mechanical Engineers.
- Lieutenant-Colonel Stuart Barrington Matthews (265893), The Royal Warwickshire Fusiliers.
- Lieutenant-Colonel (acting) Ivan Nicholas Momtchiloff, TD, (408201) Royal Regiment of Artillery, Territorial Army.
- Lieutenant-Colonel Andrew David Monteath, TD, (364207), lately The Queen's Own Lowland Yeomanry, Territorial Army.
- Lieutenant-Colonel Frederick Alan Newall (378026), Royal Regiment of Artillery.
- Lieutenant-Colonel John Humphrey Page, MC, (251684), Corps of Royal Engineers.
- Lieutenant-Colonel Peter Leslie Pearce Gould, MBE, (117329), The Queen's Regiment.
- Lieutenant-Colonel (Staff Quartermaster) Ronald Douglas Pitt, MBE, (254703), The Queen's Royal Irish Hussars (Employed List 2), Royal Armoured Corps.
- Lieutenant-Colonel (Paid Acting) Cyril Douglas Arscott Provo (302171), The Gordon Highlanders (now retired).
- Lieutenant-Colonel David Balfour Riddell-Webster (200248), The Cameronians (Scottish Rifles).
- Lieutenant-Colonel (Staff Quartermaster) John-Robert Roberts, MBE, (364903), The King's Shropshire Light Infantry (Employed List 2).
- Lieutenant-Colonel Robert Wulstan Simpson, TD, (320064), lately The North Staffordshire Regiment (The Prince of Wales's), Territorial Army.
- Lieutenant-Colonel James Thomas Sleator (358126), Royal Army Educational Corps.
- Lieutenant-Colonel (Quartermaster) Thomas Edward James Stagg (420068), Corps of Royal Engineers.
- Colonel (Acting) John Turner Stanyer (166001), Royal Army Ordnance Corps.
- Lieutenant-Colonel John Garston Stevens (145679), Royal Army Ordnance Corps.
- Lieutenant-Colonel David Madryll Stileman (277418), The Royal Green Jackets.
- Lieutenant-Colonel Ronald Vincent Thompson (207355), Royal Regiment of Artillery (Employed List 1).
- Lieutenant-Colonel Gordon Harold White, TD, (73551), Royal Army Educational Corps.
- Lieutenant-Colonel John Frederick Winn, MC, (237931), The Loyal Regiment (North Lancashire).

Overseas Awards

- Lieutenant-Colonel Joseph Marie Emile Gareze, ED, JP, Gibraltar Regiment.

Royal Air Force

- Wing Commander Douglas Terence Beamish (500903).
- Wing Commander Leonard Donald Brown, AFC, (155384).
- Wing Commander Terence Francis Burd (58506).
- Wing Commander David Brownrigg Craig (2600048).
- Wing Commander Derek James Dodimead (191803).
- Wing Commander Roy James Jarvis (152313).
- Wing Commander Joe Lee (50306).
- Wing Commander Leonard Samuel Marlow (145823).
- Wing Commander Ronald Sidney Mortley, AFC, (151292).
- Wing Commander Henry Norman Phillips, DFC, (44604).
- Wing Commander Wilfrid Relph (518134).
- Wing Commander Robert Cleghorn Robb, MB, ChB, (203686).
- Wing Commander James Kenneth Rogers (153187).
- Wing Commander Leslie Edwin Hugh Scotchmer (152183).
- Wing Officer Vera Eleanor Thomas, MBE, (895562), Women's Royal Air Force.
- Wing Commander Albert John Whitlock (59299).
- Wing Commander Douglas Charles Williams (49473).
- Acting Wing Commander Douglas Frederick Baker (50199). For services while on loan to the Royal Malaysian Air Force.
- Squadron Leader Peter Mainwaring Dunstan, MBE, (57451). For services while on loan to the Kenya Air Force.
- Squadron Leader Peter Gibbs Peacock (2484156).

Civil Division

- Olive Margery Anderson, MD. For services to Medicine in Belfast.
- Eric Annandale, TD, Chairman, Perth and Kinross War Pensions Committee.
- Reginald Heaton Armitage, Headmaster, Honley Church of England Primary School, West Riding of Yorkshire.
- Philip Bernard Atkinson, MRCS, LRCP, Medical Officer, Ministry of Social Security.
- Berenice Dorothea Baker, Senior Research Officer, Scottish Development Department.
- Elisabeth Mary Barker, Head of European Talks and English Service, British Broadcasting Corporation.
- Marjorie Alice Henham-Barrow, Secretary, Southern Regional Association for the Blind.
- William Gordon Baxter, Managing Director, W. A. Baxter & Sons Ltd, Morayshire.
- Marjorie Bayes, JP. For social and local government services in Hyde, Cheshire.
- Robert Eric Beard, MBE. General Manager, Pearl Assurance Company Ltd.
- Lieutenant-Colonel Bertie Charles Bennett, JP. For services to the community in South East London.
- Gertrude Muriel Fennell Bishop, JP, Honorary Secretary, Rutland & Leicestershire Branch Magistrates' Association.
- John Philip Bishop, National Industrial Officer, National Union of General & Municipal Workers.
- William Black, Deputy Director, Scottish Plant Breeding Station, Midlothian.
- Noel Boucher, Chairman, National Insurance Tribunal, Dartford.
- John Henry Boughton, Joint Managing Director, T. T. Boughton & Sons Ltd, Amersham Common, Buckinghamshire. For services to Export.
- Alderman Charles Frederick Bowmer, JP, Chairman, Derby No. 4 Hospital Management Committee.
- John Brierley, County Borough Controller and Head of Rescue Section, Civil Defence Corps, City of Exeter.
- James William Brown, Director, Royal Philharmonic Orchestra.
- James Lindsay Buchan, Senior Principal Scientific Officer, Ministry of Technology.
- Edward Burgess, lately Managing Director, Marshall Group of Companies.
- Captain Bernard James Robert Burns, lately Commodore Master, MV Rembrant, Bolton Steam Shipping Company Ltd.
- Charles Norman Buswell, MC. For services to the Meat industry.
- Frank Butler, Chief Engineer, Fuel Element Plant, Engineering Group, Risley, United Kingdom Atomic Energy Authority.
- Gilbert Camblin, Superintending Planning Officer, Ministry of Development for Northern Ireland.
- David Simpson Carmichael, JP, Member, National Savings Committee for Scotland.
- John Bonham-Carter, DSO, ERD, Chief Operating Officer, British Railways Board.
- Horace Avron Cartledge, lately Senior Overseas Inspector, Education Division, British Council.
- John Cheetham, Headmaster, Little Lever County Secondary School, Bolton, Lancashire.
- Frank Arthur Leslie Collis, Vice-Chairman, Chelsea Borough Youth Committee.
- Mary Hutchison Cordiner, lately Lady Superintendent of Nurses, Royal Infirmary, Edinburgh.
- James Edward Cotton, Deputy Chief Constable, Manchester City Police.
- Jessie Blossom Coulthurst, JP. For social services in Yorkshire.
- William James Cox. For services to Golf.
- Paul John Francis Croset, Managing Director, Holset Engineering Company Ltd, Huddersfield. For services to Export.
- George Leslie Cruickshank, Managing Director, Crossley Building Products Ltd.
- Gerard John Cunningham, Senior Civil Engineer, Ministry of Public Building and Works.
- Vera Evelyn Darley, Matron, Claybury Hospital, Woodford Green, Essex.
- Ifor Hughes Davies, MB, ChB, General Medical Practitioner in Merioneth.
- Elizabeth Mary Davison, Assistant, Art Department, Arts Council of Great Britain.
- Alfred Diamond, JP. For social services in East London.
- Joan Kathleen Dobbs, MBE, For services to Agriculture in Northern Ireland.
- Richard Duthie Downie, MB, ChB, lately General Medical Practitioner, Sheffield.
- Godfrey Curzon Fleetwood Duncan, Commander, Metropolitan Police.
- Alderman Mary Josephine Dunn, Chairman, Welfare Committee, Newport County Borough, Monmouthshire.
- William Edwin Dunn. For social services in the Midlands.
- Olive Eden, JP, Alderman, Derbyshire County Council.
- Joseph Douglas Elstone, Marketing Director, David Brown Tractors Ltd, Huddersfield.
- Elisabeth Emery, JP, Member, Birmingham Regional Hospital Board.
- Hedley Robert Ewence, Senior Building Surveyor, Office of the Receiver for the Metropolitan Police District.
- Vernon John Fanstone, Director, National Federation of Builders' & Plumbers' Merchants.
- John Gerald Fardell, TD, lately Registrar, Newport and Ryde (Isle of Wight) County Court.
- Frank Clifford Foster, Director of Borstal After-Care.
- Francis Wilfred Fry, JP, lately Area General Manager, No. 4 Area, Northumberland and Durham Division, National Coal Board.
- James Martin Gardiner, Vice-President, International Association of Fishmeal Manufacturers.
- Noel Mackenzie Garrard, Overseas Liaison Officer, National Institute of Agricultural Engineering, Agricultural Research Council.
- David Gemmill, JP, Chairman, Cambridge and Isle of Ely Agricultural Executive Committee.
- The Very Reverend Joseph Hugh Rush Gibson, Chairman, Board of Management, Malone and Whiteabbey Training Schools, Northern Ireland.
- Leonard Joseph Harry Gibson, Chief Accountant, Commonwealth War Graves Commission.
- Richard George Good. For services to the Dairy trade.
- Henry William Goodinge, Deputy Director, Society of British Aerospace Companies Ltd. For services to Export.
- Alexander John Gordon, Architect.
- Joseph William Goyder, Assistant Commissioner, City of London Police.
- Captain Edward Thompson Graham, Royal Navy (Retired). For services to Horse Racing.
- William Arthur Greenhill, Managing Director, Bergius-Kelvin Company Ltd. For services to Export.
- Eric Norman Greer, Deputy Director, Flour Milling and Baking Research Association.
- Robert Aylmer Haldane, lately Principal, Scottish Headquarters, The Nature Conservancy.
- John Percival Hall, HM Senior District Inspector of Mines and Quarries, Ministry of Power.
- Sister Beatrice Elizabeth Hammond, Founder and lately Director, Notre Dame Child Guidance Clinic, Liverpool.
- Major Richard Hargreaves, MBE. For services to the British Legion.
- Leslie Arthur James Hatcher, Grade 5 Officer, HM Diplomatic Service.
- Colonel Charles Ralph Hodgson, DSO, Deputy Chairman and Sales Director, C. & J. Hampton Ltd, Sheffield.
- D'Arcy Vera Hogg, HM Inspector of Schools, Department of Education and Science.
- Frank Douglas Holder, MC, JP, DL, Chairman, No. 276 (Chelmsford) Squadron Committee, Air Training Corps.
- John Holland, JP, Alderman, Stockport County Borough Council.
- John Hutcheson, Rector, Mackie Academy, Stonehaven, Kincardineshire.
- Doris Morison Inches, Chairman, Scottish Standing Conference of Voluntary Youth Organisations.
- Margaret Isabella Jaboor, lately Director of the Service to Refugees, The World Council of Churches.
- Albert Jackson, Technical Adviser on Steelmaking, The United Steel Companies Ltd.
- Samuel Harries Jerrett, Director, British Pottery Manufacturers' Federation.
- Gwyneth Marianne Wansbrough-Jones, Children's Officer, Essex County Council.
- Sidney Wallace Jones, Principal Supply and Transport Officer, Gibraltar, Ministry of Defence (Royal Navy).
- The Reverend Canon Thomas George King, Chairman, Hampshire County Youth Advisory Committee.
- Reginald Walter Kingsbury, Chief Executive Officer, Central Office of Information.
- Herbert Langford, Director, Liverpool Region, National Federation of Building Trades Employers.
- Sydney John Lee, Head of Economics Department, National Farmers' Union.
- Alderman Hyman Appleby Leon, MBE, lately Mayor of Richmond upon Thames.
- Alexander Lightbody, Technical Executive, Hawker Siddeley Dynamics Ltd.
- Frederick William Lindgren, Honorary Treasurer, The Royal Air Forces Association.
- John Alfred Lofthouse, Chairman, Heavy Organic Chemical Division, Imperial Chemical Industries Ltd.
- Leonard Thornton Lowe, lately Principal, Monmouthshire Institute of Agriculture.
- Thomas Benjamin Vickerton McCullum, Chief Constable, Berwick, Roxburgh and Selkirk Constabulary.
- Kate Florence McDougall, Reader in Social Work, London School of Economics and Political Science.
- James Levie McIntosh, Chief Engineer, Blue Star Line Ltd.
- Alderman Hugh Anthony McKay, JP, Mayor of Larne, County Antrim.
- Archibald Alastair MacKelvie, MD, FRCS, Ed, Consultant Urologist and Consultant Surgeon, Falkirk and Stirling Royal Infirmaries.
- Alexander McLaren, Senior Civil Engineer, Ministry of Public Building and Works.
- Alexander John Macleod, MB, ChB, General Medical Practitioner, Lochmaddy, North Uist.
- Frank Rostron McManus, Councillor, Grange Urban District Council, Lancashire.
- Kenneth Macrae, Headmaster, Cranhill Secondary School, Glasgow.
- Walter Moray Mair, Chairman, War Pensions Advisory Committee, Republic of Ireland.
- Harold Clitherow Margrett, lately Chairman, Board of Governors, Hong Kong House, London.
- Herbert Marsden, Director, Edge Tool Industries Ltd. For services to Export.
- Lieutenant-Commander George Henry Randolph Martin, Royal Naval Volunteer Reserve, Deputy Chairman, London Electricity Consultative Council.
- John Thomas Martin, Senior Principal Scientific Officer, Agricultural and Horticultural Research Station, Long Ashton, Somerset.
- Leslie Eric Evershed-Martin, Vice-Chairman, Chichester Festival Theatre Trust.
- Leslie Norman Mathers, Principal Inspector of Taxes, Board of Inland Revenue.
- Alderman Francis James Mavin, JP, Chairman Tynemouth Executive Council, National Health Service.
- Elizabeth Hewton Maxwell, Headmistress, Richmond Lodge School, Belfast.
- Rollo John Oliver Meyer, Headmaster, Millfield School, Somerset.
- Arthur Douglas Middleton, lately Research Director, Game Research Association.
- Harold Walters Millen, Financial Adviser to the Urban District Councils Association.
- Alderman Dorothea Kathleen Garnet Watson-Miller, JP, lately Mayor of Brighton.
- William Rankin Moodie, Controller, Packaging and Bookbinding Group, Remploy Ltd.
- James Arthur Moody, MB, BCh, General Medical Practitioner, Ilford.
- Hugh Treharne Morgan, TD, Senior Legal Assistant, Ministry of Labour.
- Elaine Anita Mosley, JP. For local services, particularly to youth, in Manchester.
- Lieutenant-Colonel Godfrey John William Mundy, Headmaster, Belgrave Primary School, Balsall Heath, Birmingham.
- Stanley Frank Nicholls, MBE, Senior Chief Executive Officer, Foreign Office and Commonwealth Office.
- Henry Nutt, General Secretary, Workers' Educational Association.
- Edward Maurice Owens, JP, Member, National Advisory Council on Education for Industry and Commerce.
- Leonard George Oxford, Chairman, Fram Filters Ltd. For services to Export.
- Colonel Roland William Andrew Painter, MC, Chairman, Worcester and Kidderminster War Pensions Committee.
- Thomas William Patrick Parrinder. For services to youth in Essex.
- Ernest Frederick Phillips, Principal Clerk to the Corporation of Lloyd's.
- Henry Richard Pratt, Chief Constable, Bedfordshire and Luton Constabulary.
- Doris Avery Radford, MBE, Head of Housing Department, Women's Royal Voluntary Service.
- Alethea Sarah Ratcliffe, JP, Alderman, Devon County Council.
- Richard Edmund Reason, Research Manager, Rank Taylor Hobson, Leicester.
- Eileen Mary Rees, Matron, Cardiff Royal Infirmary.
- Samuel Hugh Richards, Technical Consultant, Marshall Richards Machine Company Ltd, Crook, County Durham. For services to Export.
- Cyril Howard Rock, lately Director, Paisley Museum and Art Gallery.
- Balsillie Russell. For services to Association Football in Scotland.
- Emily Rydz. For services to the welfare of elderly Jewish people in Manchester.
- Jane Boyd Saggar, JP, Convener, Health and Welfare Committee, Dundee Corporation.
- Arthur Bartram Savage, Director of British Weeks, Board of Trade.
- Desmond William Scarth, Senior Chief Executive Officer, Ministry of Social Security.
- Kenneth Arthur Scollay, Principal Clerk, Department of the Official Solicitor, Lord Chancellor's Departments.
- Ian Francis Henry Sconce, MBE, TD, Principal, Ministry of Defence (Army).
- Andrew Ronald Semple, Farmer. Chairman, Southern Agricultural Executive Committee (Scotland).
- Alfred Sewart, Executive Director of Production, Hawker Siddeley Aviation Ltd.
- The Reverend William Wynn Simpson, General Secretary, Council of Christians and Jews.
- George Nicholas Greenwell Smith. Vice-Principal, Bede College, Durham.
- Frederick Elsworth Sowden, JP, Member, South West Metropolitan Regional Hospital Board.
- Sydney Sparke, Principal Inspector, Board of Customs and Excise.
- Alan Oscar Squires, Assistant Director of Housing, Greater London Council.
- George Reginald Stanbury, lately Senior Principal Scientific Officer, Home Office.
- Harry Clifford Owen Stanbury, Telephone Manager, Plymouth, General Post Office.
- Reginald Albert Stark, Chairman, Isle of Wight Agricultural Executive Committee.
- Peter Trevelyan Stephens, Chairman and Joint Managing Director, Saunders Valve Company Ltd. For services to Export.
- William Sampson Stevenson, Trawler owner and fish salesman, Newlyn, Cornwall.
- James Gordon Stewart, MB, ChB, General Medical Practitioner, Oldham.
- Group Captain Peter Graham Stewart, DFC, AEA, Vice-Chairman (Air), City of London Territorial and Auxiliary Forces Association.
- Alderman Frederick John Stott, JP, Chairman, Area Museums Council for the South West.
- Commander Claude Everard John Streatfeild, JP, DL, Royal Navy (Retired). For services to Agriculture in the South West of England.
- Charles Herbert Sykes, Chief Pharmacist, London Hospital.
- Terence William Syrett, Assistant Chief Officer, London Fire Brigade.
- Ian Taylor, MD, FRCP, Principal Medical Officer, Greater London Council.
- Robert Steel Taylor, Principal Planner, Ministry of Housing and Local Government.
- John Gilmore Tedd, Principal Scientific Officer, Ministry of Defence (Royal Air Force).
- Sydney Bruce Thomas, Superintending Engineer, Ministry of Transport.
- Vida Ivy Thompson, Headmistress, Friern Girls' Secondary School, London.
- Alderman Alan Perrett Tice, JP. For public services in Surrey.
- Thomas Tinto, Secretary and Principal Welfare Services Officer, Health and Welfare Department, Glasgow Corporation.
- Ronald William Tizard, Deputy Director of Audit, Exchequer and Audit Department.
- Frederick William Tomlinson, Chairman and Managing Director, Pyrotenax Ltd, Hebburn, County Durham. For services to Export.
- Olivera Rowena, Lady Traherne, Chief Superintendent for Wales, St. John Ambulance Brigade.
- Ian Clarence Trelawny, DSC, Director and General Manager, Felixstowe Dock & Railway Company.
- Sydney Francis Tuck, Assistant Director Engineering, Royal Aircraft Establishment, Ministry of Technology.
- Leopoldo Alfonso Villa. For services to land and water speed records.
- Robert Ernest Wacher, Chief Wayleave Officer, Headquarters Central Electricity Generating Board.
- Robert Sharp Walker, TD, Chairman, Dundee Trustee Savings Bank.
- Captain Herbert Joseph Ward, JP, DL, lately Chairman, Isle of Wight County Council.
- Katharine Waters, Principal, Clarendon College of Further Education, Nottingham.
- Thomas Alexander Webb, Chief Executive, Ship & Boat Builders' National Federation.
- Joseph Weltman, Education Officer, Independent Television Authority.
- Allen James Whitaker, MB, MRCS, General Medical Practitioner, Guildford.
- Dorothy Marion White, Deputy Chief Nursing Officer, Ministry of Health.
- Patrick Bruce Whitehouse, Chairman, B. Whitehouse & Sons Ltd.
- Meredydd Llewelyn Gwarnant Williams, JP, Alderman, Cardiganshire County Council.
- Trevor Lloyd Williams, Clerk of Wrexham Rural District Council, Denbighshire.
- George Stanley Wilson, Chief Safety Inspector, Ministry of Agriculture, Fisheries and Food.
- John Lionel Wood, MC, Chairman, Worcester Savings Committee.
- Arthur Stuart Woodhams, Chairman, Whiffen & Sons Ltd.
- Norman Richards Woolfenden, JP, Chairman, Rochdale and District Hospital Management Committee.
- Colonel John Henton Wright, TD, DL, Chairman, Lincoln and District Local Employment Committee.
- Ben Nicholson Young, Alderman, Gateshead County Borough Council.

Diplomatic Service and Overseas List

- John Kirkwood Blair, British Subject resident in Peru.
- Francis Alfred Noel Bott, lately Electrical Engineering Adviser to the Government of Jordan.
- Andrew Stolf Burn, JP. For public services in British Honduras.
- James Henry Castleton, MBE, British Representative, Allied Travel Office, Berlin.
- Walter James Childerstone, British Subject resident in Ceylon.
- Leonard Cox, British Trade Commissioner, Halifax.
- Alfred George Crook, Postmaster General, Hong Kong.
- John Charles Crossley, Commercial Officer, Her Majesty's Embassy, Bogota.
- Eric Edgar Davies, British Subject resident in Chile.
- Patrick Taylor Davies, Administrative Officer, Class I, Northern Region, Nigeria.
- John Harold Delacour, British Subject resident in Thailand.
- Basil Fitzpatrick Dias, Director of Public Prosecutions, Saint Christopher-Nevis-Anguilla.
- Andre Cornibert DuBoulay. For public services in Saint Lucia.
- Michael Granville Edge, Superintendent of Police, Jesselton, Malaysia.
- Herbert Pullar Elder, Technical Assistance Officer, Cyprus.
- Roy Fox, First Secretary (Commercial), British High Commission, Karachi.
- Simon Macleod Frazer, MB, BS, Director of Health Services, Bermuda.
- George Edgar Gardiner, British Subject resident in Spain.
- Edward John Fox. Hackett, Public Relations Officer, Fiji.
- Duncan Mackinnon Hamilton, BM, BCh, Surgeon Specialist, Federal Ministry of Health, Aden.
- Edgar Leslie Hammond. For public services through voluntary organisations in the Bahamas.
- Henry David Stewart Hardie, British Subject, lately resident in India.
- Thomas Patrick Augustine Healy, lately Administrative Officer, Class I, Northern Region, Nigeria.
- Douglas Bertram Devenant Henchman, lately Assistant Commissioner of Police, Sabah, Malaysia.
- Denis William Hennessy, Her Majesty's Consul-General, Hanover.
- Robert Thomas Mitchell Henry, lately Commissioner of Police, Sarawak, Malaysia.
- Joseph Paul Hewitt, lately Director of Marine, Hong Kong.
- John Edgar McKecknie Horne, formerly Director of Forest Research, Nigeria.
- David Reginald Estcourt Jackson, MBE, Agricultural Adviser, Eastern Region, Nigeria.
- George Stewart Kennedy, Condominium Treasurer and Controller of Customs, New Hebrides.
- James Spedding Kirkman, Warden of Coastal Historical Sites, Kenya.
- Andrew Knox, Bursar, Ahmadu Bello University, Northern Region, Nigeria.
- Tadeusz Michael Kraszewski, MD, ChB, Senior Medical Officer, General Hospital, Kuching, Malaysia.
- John Lawrence Lakin, Welfare Officer, Abeokuta Leprosarium, Western Region, Nigeria.
- Henry Martyn McGladdery, MB, BS, Surgeon, Lady Templer Hospital, Kuala Lumpur.
- Geoffrey Stuart McWilliam, First Secretary and Head of Chancery, Her Majesty's Embassy, Quito.
- John Anthony Moore. For services to the community in Fiji.
- Arthur Newsam, Rubber Research Institute of Malaya.
- Ah Kow Ng Cheng Hin, MB, BCh, Senior Pathologist, Mauritius.
- Stanley Hudson Nicholson, Director of Civil Aviation, Sabah, Malaysia.
- Arthur Clifford Gentle Palmer, MBE, lately Manager, and Programme Director, Windward Islands Broadcasting Service, Grenada.
- Jan Leslie Samuel Steele-Perkins, LRCP, LRCS(Ed.), Eye Specialist, Ministry of Health, Bahamas.
- Thomas Edward Augustus Perkins, Permanent Secretary, Ministry of Communications and Works, Montserrat.
- Ronald McDonell Pryor, British Subject resident in Brazil.
- William Arnold Raby, Assistant Commissioner of Police, Sabah, Malaysia.
- Richard Rupert Rees. British Subject lately resident in Malaysia.
- Charlotte Annie Reid Director, English Language Teaching Institute, Bhopal, India.
- Crawford Robertson Reid, Director of Audit, Aden.
- Archibald Rendall, First Secretary (Commercial) Her Majesty's Embassy, Bucharest.
- Kenneth Sargent, Permanent Secretary, Ministry of Development and Planning, Malawi.
- Arthur Holwell Masterton-Smith, Director of Marine, Sabah, Malaysia.
- John Derek Sowerby, MBE, Deputy Commissioner of Police, Nigeria.
- Harry Sykes, Deputy Chief Engineer, National Electricity Board, States of Malaya.
- Alexander Szeley, Medical Superintendent, Queen Elizabeth Hospital, Sabah, Malaysia.
- Szeto Wai, JP. For public and social services in Hong Kong.
- Tang Ping-yuan. For public services in Hong Kong.
- Thomas Wheatley Tweedie, British Subject resident in Yugoslavia.
- Leslie Anderson Varty, TD, lately Comptroller-General of Inland Revenue, Malaysia.
- James Aloysius Waight, MBE, Surveyor-General, British Honduras.
- George Walkley, Chief Mechanical and Electrical Engineer, Western Region, Nigeria.
- Reverend Father James Michael Wall, Priest, Society of Marists. For public services in the British Solomon Islands.
- John Stewart Warren, Deputy Permanent Secretary, Ministry of Information, Northern Region, Nigeria.
- Hilary Godwin Wayment, British Council Representative, The Netherlands.
- Alexander Edwin Welsh, City Treasurer, Penang, Malaysia.
- Charles Vivian Leslie Westergreen, MBE, Special Duties Officer, Seychelles.
- Arthur William Edge Wheeler, Director of Public Prosecutions, Northern Region, Nigeria.
- Stephen Dennis Whetham, British Subject resident in Kenya.
- John Alexander Williams, Administrative Officer, Class 1B, Kuching, Malaysia.
- Donald Caswell Wright, lately Reuters Correspondent in the Caribbean.
- Hendrik Abraham Esterhuysen, Deputy Director of Education, Swaziland.

State of New South Wales

- William Henry Cavill Bentley. For services to commerce.
- Stanley Ernest Card. For services to the community, particularly in the field of industrial relations.
- The Reverend Brother Joseph Hugh Crowley. For services to education.
- Esme Fenston. For services to journalism.
- George Nathaniel Shirt, MM. For services to ex-servicemen.
- Frederick Kynnersley Smythies Woods. For services to education.

State of Victoria

- Edgar James Bartrop, JP. For services to the community especially in the field of industrial development and welfare.
- Annie Edith Galvin, of Bendigo. For services to the community.
- Councillor Ebenezer William Giles, of Stawell. President of the Municipal Association of Victoria.
- William Balcombe Griffiths, MC, ED, of South Yarra. For services to the community, particularly to architecture and education.
- Raymond Edward Trickey, lately Chairman of the Melbourne and Metropolitan Board of Works.
- The Reverend Canon Philip St. John Wilson, Headmaster of Brighton Grammar School.

State of Queensland

- Geoffrey Gibson Boreham. For services to the community, particularly to local government.
- Kiernan John Joseph Dorney, DSO, MB, MS. For services in the fields of medicine and community welfare.
- Daniel John Kearney. For services in the Public Service and hospital administration.
- Mary Hycinthe Petronel White. For services to the community and local government.

State of South Australia

- Thomas John Meaney, Chief Officer, South Australian Fire Brigade.
- The Reverend Edward John Mulvihill. For services to the community and education.

State of Western Australia

- John Hyman Abrahams. Mayor of the City of Subiaco.
- Benjamin Kempston Killerby, JP. For services to the community, particularly in the field of local government.
- Adelaide Rita Dorothy Laurie, Mayoress of the City of Fremantle.

State of Tasmania

- William Edward Harold Rainbird, JP. For services to the community.
- Roydon Edward George Shone. For services to journalism.

==== Member of the Order of the British Empire (MBE) ====
Military Division
Royal Navy

- Lieutenant Commander Robert Henry Bradley, VRD, Royal Naval Reserve.
- Lieutenant Commander Jack Cooper.
- Lieutenant Commander (SD) (G) Arthur Reginald Derrick.
- Lieutenant Commander Nicholas Bonham Carter Evelegh, (now Retired). For services with the British Joint Services Training Team, Ghana.
- Lieutenant Commander Arthur John Futcher.
- Lieutenant Commander (E) Brian David Griffiths.
- Supply Sub Lieutenant Raymond Harwood Grist. Formerly on loan to the Royal Malaysian Navy.
- Lieutenant (SD) (AV) Bernard George Gunter.
- Lieutenant Commander (E) John Maurice Hepburn, (now Retired).
- Lieutenant Commander John Robin Hutton. On loan to the Royal Malaysian Navy.
- Lieutenant Commander John Francis Kennett.
- Wardmaster Lieutenant Terence Montgomery.
- Lieutenant Commander Derek Plummer.
- Engineer Lieutenant Commander (L) Bernard James Skinner.
- Supply Lieutenant Commander (W) Leonard William Truscott.
- Captain Eric Harvey Warren, Royal Marines.

Army

- Lieutenant Roland Derek Allen (481391), Royal Corps of Signals.
- 22902372 Warrant Officer Class II (Foreman of Signals) Charles Nevell Armitage, Royal Corps of Signals.
- 884076 Warrant Officer Class I (acting) Ronald Robert Baber, Corps of Royal Electrical and Mechanical Engineers.
- Major (Quartermaster) Henry James Bayley (450008), Royal Regiment of Artillery.
- 14448672 Warrant Officer Class I (Master Gunner) John Gordon Bowdell, Royal Regiment of Artillery.
- Major Derek Standring Brown (367454), Corps of Royal Electrical and Mechanical Engineers.
- Major Robert John Finlay Brown (430246), The Cameronians (Scottish Rifles).
- Captain (Quartermaster) John Calleja (475570), Corps of Royal Engineers.
- Major James Alaistair Douglas Cameron, TD, (364688), lately Corps of Royal Engineers, Territorial Army.
- 2228966 Warrant Officer Class II John Alfred Cannon, Royal Regiment of Artillery.
- Major Sidney Walter Edward Carter (273720), Royal Corps of Transport.
- Major (O.E.O.) Alan Cogger (282396), Royal Army Ordnance Corps, Federal Regular Army, Aden.
- Major (acting) Robert Anthony Gordon Courage (362220), Grenadier Guards.
- Captain (acting) William Cowan (367365), Army Cadet Force.
- 22761038 Warrant Officer, Class I (acting) Trafford Richard Barry Davies, Royal Army Ordnance Corps, Federal Regular Army, Aden.
- Major (Quartermaster) Edgar George Wilton Davis (222045), Corps of Royal Engineers.
- LS/2047592 Warrant Officer Class I Basil William Dodge, Royal Regiment of Artillery.
- 22254777 Warrant Officer Class II Ernest Albert James Drake, Corps of Royal Engineers, Territorial Army (now retired).
- Captain William John Dutton (466742), Corps of Royal Electrical and Mechanical Engineers.
- Major (acting) John Michael Ellingworth (382535), Royal Corps of Signals.
- Lieutenant Ronald Fairs, BEM, (482450), Royal Army Ordnance Corps.
- 22553025 Warrant Officer Class II William Cyril George Foster, lately Corps of Royal Engineers, Territorial Army.
- 2044625 Warrant Officer Class II Roy Percival Seccombe Gray, MM, lately Corps of Royal Engineers, Territorial Army.
- Lieutenant Joan Greenfield (478775), lately Women's Royal Army Corps, Territorial Army.
- 6275 Major David William Hanson (420851), The Prince of Wales's Own Regiment of Yorkshire.
- Major Jerrold Alexander Harrison, MC, (289691), Royal Regiment of Artillery.
- Major (Paymaster) James Charles Robert Hewgill (432238), Royal Army Pay Corps.
- Major Alastair Clive Ross Howman (411241), The Argyll and Sutherland Highlanders (Princess Louise's].
- Captain Leslie Turner Hunt (303872), lately Corps of Royal Military Police, Territorial Army, now Royal Leicestershire Regiment (Territorial) T. & A.V.R.
- Major (Paymaster) James Patrick Hutchison (402256), lately Royal Army Pay Corps, Territorial Army.
- Major (acting) Alfred Richard Johnson (439268), General List.
- Major Evelyn Gertrude Joynt (316244), Women's Royal Army Corps (R.A.R.O.)
- Major (acting) Ronald Howard Kirby (298597), Army Cadet Force.
- Major Henry Desmond Allen Langley (407937), The Life Guards.
- Major Cyril Norman Le Gassick (379742), Royal Corps of Signals, formerly on loan to the Government of Malaysia.
- Major (acting) George William Lennie (372243), Corps'of Royal Engineers.
- Major (paid acting) Ian Mackay (440088), The Argyll and Sutherland Highlanders (Princess Louise's).
- Captain (acting) Raymond Marshall (467939), Army Cadet Force.
- Captain (acting) (Quartermaster) William Shand McKay (475422), lately The Queen's Own Cameron Highlanders, Territorial Army.
- Major (Assistant Paymaster) Edward Joseph Monks (441293), Royal Army Pay Corps.
- 22530429 Warrant Officer Class II George Moss, lately Queens Royal Rifles, Territorial Army.
- Major Andrew Dewe Myrtle (430393), The King's Own Scottish Borderers.
- Major Andrew Napier (66599), Royal Regiment of Artillery.
- Captain Joseph Parker, BEM, (469624), Corps of Royal Electrical and Mechanical Engineers.
- Major Anthony Dallin Parsons, MC, (121151), The Duke of Edinburgh's Royal Regiment (Berkshire and Wiltshire).
- Major (Quartermaster) Arthur George Parsons, MC, (430753), The Royal Warwickshire Fusiliers.
- Major (Garrison Engineer), John Hodgkinson Price (375153), Corps of Royal Engineers, British Joint Services Training Team, Ghana.
- Major (Quartermaster) Henry Richardson (445091), The Sherwood Foresters (Nottinghamshire and Derbyshire Regiment).
- Captain John Manfield Ridgway (459313), The Parachute Regiment.
- Major Michael Gordon Lindfield Roberts (400050), Corps of Royal Engineers.
- 2670713 Warrant Officer Class II Lionel George Rossiter, Coldstream Guards.
- 2090711 Warrant Officer Class II Stephen Edward Savage, lately Royal Corps of Signals, Territorial Army.
- Captain Rowland Edgecombe Shazell (445317), General List.
- 22559207 Warrant Officer Class I Cecil Ivor Shoulders, Royal Army Ordnance Corps.
- Captain (Quartermaster) Anthony Joseph Cameron Taylor (472712), Royal Regiment of Artillery.
- Major (Quartermaster) Thomas Thomas (452756), The Parachute Regiment.
- Major William George Rhyll Turner (433257), The Duke of Edinburgh's Royal Regiment (Berkshire and Wiltshire).
- Lieutenant (Quartermaster) Francis Clement Warr (474682), lately The Herefordshire Light Infantry, Territorial Army.
- Captain (Quartermaster) Thomas Henry Wheeler (460001), lately The Wiltshire Regiment, Territorial Army.
- Captain Alan Roderick Williamson (443597), Royal Army Ordnance Corps, formerly on loan to the Government of Malaysia.
- Major (local) Frederick Trevor Woods (361617), Army Cadet Force.

Overseas Awards

- Major Kenneth John Hanmer, ED, The Hong Kong Regiment (The Volunteers).
- Wakil Qaid Salim Umar al Johi, Hadrami Beduin Legion.

Royal Air Force

- Squadron Leader Leonard Banham (583847). For services with the British Joint Services Training Team, Ghana.
- Squadron Leader Derek George Blunden (582746).
- Squadron Leader Frank Braybrook (136390).
- Squadron Leader Philip Gathorne Gibson (660230), RAF Regiment.
- Squadron Leader Terence Evan Gill (503340).
- Squadron Leader Alec George Greeves (516129).
- Squadron Leader Kenneth Hebborn (503242).
- Squadron Leader Peter Richard Hill (185470).
- Squadron Leader (now Wing Commander) John James Barclay Hobbs, MB, BS, (501301).
- Squadron Leader George Kenneth King (52281).
- Squadron Leader Anthony John Liles (502949).
- Squadron Leader Geoffrey Walter Eustace Loveless (505443).
- Squadron Leader Cyril Charles Arthur Luter (53010).
- Squadron Leader William Moyes (185216).
- Squadron Leader Benjamin Edward Nicol (504663).
- Squadron Leader Laurence Alan Edward Osbon, DFC, (82725).
- Squadron Leader (now Wing Commander) Dennis Mackinder Parker, MB, ChB, (504056). For services with the British Joint Services Training Team, Ghana.
- Squadron Leader Ronald Ian Stuart-Paul (607586).
- Squadron Leader Arthur George Scott (154456).
- Squadron Leader Hector Desmond Seymour (579979).
- Squadron Leader John Richard Sims (198927), (Retired).
- Acting Squadron Leader Robert Mark Hanagan (527716).
- Acting Squadron Leader Maurice Roland Monk (504169).
- Acting Squadron Leader Henry Rex Oldland, DFC, (185807), Royal Air Force Volunteer Reserve (Training Branch).
- Flight Lieutenant Keith Thomas William Ambler (4049133).
- Flight Lieutenant David Hugh Geoffrey Baker (609129).
- Flight Lieutenant Arthur Joseph Burke (505502).
- Flight Lieutenant Philip Fitzpatrick (2732138).
- Flight Lieutenant Peter Holland (4109708).
- Flight Lieutenant James Aspinall Hughes (583844). For services while on loan to the Royal Malaysian Air Force.
- Flight Lieutenant John Frederick Jefferis (592787).
- Flight Lieutenant William Jones (173399).
- Flight Lieutenant Bogdan Muth, DFC, (500390).
- Flight Lieutenant Max Pettey (1606305). For services while on loan to the Kenya Air Force.
- Flight Lieutenant David Roy Vickers (584127).
- Flight Lieutenant William Michael John Wellen (579288).
- Warrant Officer Leslie George Bywaters (C0547624).
- Warrant Officer James Denness (X0567355).
- Warrant Officer Malcolm Frederick Corum Downie, BEM, (V0518688).
- Warrant Officer Ellen Ruth Duff (N0430808), Women's Royal Air Force.
- Warrant Officer Thomas Miller (M0548968).
- Warrant Officer Charles John Morrell, BEM, (U1600449), Royal Air Force Regiment.
- Warrant Officer Stanley William Sands (K0643649).
- Warrant Officer Walter Oliver Slater (J0540779).
- Warrant Officer John Thornton Wildman (U0565047).

Civil Division

- John Cecil Abbott, Fire Protection Manager (Security), British Overseas Airways Corporation.
- Mildred Mary Ager, Financial Director and Company Secretary, British Midland Airways Ltd.
- Edward Stanley Archer, Head of Stores Department, Sea Cadet Corps Headquarters.
- Robert Martin Armour, Divisional Chief Engineer, Short Brothers & Harland Ltd, Castlereagh, Northern Ireland.
- Hugh Terence Armstrong, DSC. For services to the British Legion in Northern Ireland.
- Anne King Arnott, Surgical Ward Sister, General Infirmary, Leeds.
- Andrew McCutcheon Atkinson, Secretary and Organiser, Glasgow Retirement Council.
- Victor Horace Balding, Chairman and Managing Director, Balding Engineering Ltd. For services to Export.
- Elizabeth May Ballantyne, Matron, Law Hospital, Carluke, Lanarkshire.
- Ernest Jack Barkway, Chief Superintendent, Essex County Constabulary.
- Ralph Ladislas Barnett, Location Manager, Electric & Musical Industries Electronics Ltd.
- Robert Stuart Barr, Grade 3 Officer, Ministry of Labour.
- Mark Elgar Barrett, Clerk to the Mere and Tisbury Rural District Council, Wiltshire.
- Anne Barry, Higher Executive Officer, Lord Chancellor's Department.
- Elsie Morrell Baxter, Vice-President, Leeds National Savings Schools Sub-Committee.
- Arthur Thomas Sydney Beebee, lately Civil Defence Officer, South Eastern Region, Central Electricity Generating Board.
- Norman Henry Beechey. For services to Youth in Buckinghamshire.
- Jessie Constance Belcham, Executive Officer, Crown Agents for Oversea Governments and Administrations.
- Frederick George Belsham, Printing Technical Officer, HM Stationery Office.
- Muriel Alice Birch, Senior Personal Secretary, Ministry of Public Building and Works.
- Janet Donaldson Blair, Headmistress, Hume Primary School, Berwickshire.
- Gledhill Stanley Blatch, Intelligence Officer Grade I, Ministry of Defence (Army).
- Edmund Frederick Boulton, JP, Deputy Chairman, Wiltshire Agricultural Executive Committee.
- Edward Bowen, Technical Consultant, W. & T. Avery Ltd.
- Kenneth George Bowen, Chief Superintendent, Glamorgan Constabulary.
- Frederick John Bowyer, Chief Rescue Officer, Civil Defence Corps, Scunthorpe.
- Raymond Henry Bradley, Chief Engineer, Television Wales & the West Ltd.
- David Alexander Brown, Chief Office Clerk, House of Commons.
- Derek Arthur Brown, a Marketing and Sales Manager, Baker Perkins (Exports) Ltd. For services to Export.
- Edwin Charles Brown, District Organiser, National Union of Agricultural Workers.
- Harold Godart Brown, Film Preservation Officer, National Film Archive.
- John Vincent Thomas Brown, Voluntary Welfare Worker, Billingham, County Durham.
- George Joseph Bruzaud. For services to the community in West Byfleet.
- Arthur Edward Burge, Ground Superintendent, Research Group, Harwell, United Kingdom Atomic Energy Authority.
- John Gordon Burgess, MB, ChB, General Medical Practitioner, Forfar.
- Robert Burr, Cypher Superintendent, Diplomatic Wireless Service, Foreign Office and Commonwealth Office.
- Albert Edward Burrage, Chairman, Burrage & Boyde Ltd, Northampton.
- Winifred Valentine Burrey (Mrs. Perrott), Chairman, Haringey National Savings Industrial Sub-Committee.
- Charles Hubert Archibald Butler, Commandant, Essex County Special Constabulary.
- Elizabeth Christina Canby, Grade 7 Officer, HM Diplomatic Service.
- Joyce Cariss, lately Welfare Worker, Training Depot, Brigade of Gurkhas, Kedah, Women's Royal Voluntary Service.
- James Smith Carlaw, Joint Managing Director, David Carlaw & Sons Ltd. For services to Export.
- Wilfred Ernest Carrington, Senior Experimental Officer, Ministry of Technology.
- Edwin George Carter, JP, General Manager, The Thames Valley Trustee Savings Bank.
- Herbert Catt, JP, Chairman, Walland Marsh Internal Drainage Board.
- Mr. Chan Kam Yuen, Executive Officer (Local), Overseas Record Office, Hong Kong, Ministry of Defence (Army).
- Frederick John Chandler, Lately Senior Executive Officer, Ministry of Defence (Royal Air Force).
- Henry Stanley Chaney, Member and Past President of the Council of the Building Societies Institute.
- Henry Edward Charlton Chard, Export Director, Weston Biscuit Company (Wales) Ltd. For services to Export.
- Edward Church, Chairman, Regional Council of National Federation of Building Trades Operatives.
- Ronald Clare, Area Manager, North Western Area, National Industrial Fuel Efficiency Service.
- Ivy Georgina Amy Clarke, Higher Executive Officer, HM Treasury.
- William John Gordon Clarke, General Manager, G.B. Britton & Sons Ltd, Northern, Ireland.
- Mabel Marion Coate, Secretary, Franco-British Society.
- Ernest Selkirk Coathup, Managing Director, The Diamond Stylus Company Ltd. For services to Export.
- William Albert Coggan, Divisional Officer, Hampshire Fire Brigade.
- William Albert Coley, JP, lately Member, Stourport-on-Severn Urban District Council.
- Eustace Collier, JP. For services to the community in Leigh, Lancashire.
- Leonard Cyril Collingridge, Chairman, J. Collingridge Ltd, Covent Garden.
- Alexander Muir Merry Connell, Chief Sanitary Inspector, Greenock.
- Patrick Reardon Connor, Experimental Officer, Ministry of Technology.
- Major James Joseph Corbett, Chief Clerk, Territorial and Auxiliary Forces Association for the County of Somerset.
- James More Cormack, Export Manager, Britfish Ltd, Great Yarmouth. For services to Export.
- Ernest Cornthwaite, Headmaster, Carbrook Church of England School, Sheffield.
- Ruth Mary Croft, County Organiser, Devon, Women's Royal Voluntary Service.
- Grace Lilian Crook, Honorary Librarian, Hospital Library, Queen Elizabeth Hospital, Birmingham.
- Leslie James Curd, Accountant, Agricultural Co-operative Association Ltd.
- Robert Henry Currell, Secretary and Clerk to the Governors, Northern Polytechnic and National College of Rubber Technology, London.
- Hywel Wyn Davies, Deputy Headmaster and Director of Music, Timsbury County Secondary School, Somerset.
- Margaretta Davies, Lately Branch Nursing Superintendent, City of London Branch, British Red Cross Society.
- Alexander Dawson, Chairman, Dawson & Downie Ltd, Clydebank. For services to Export.
- John Dewar, Resident Manager, Belmont Camp School, Meigle, Perthshire.
- Eleanor Jeannie Dey, Secretary, Macaulay Institute for Soil Research.
- Sigmar Bernd Dinn, Chairman and Managing Director, Power Components Ltd. For services to Export.
- Nancy Mary Dixon, lately Deputy General Superintendent and Director of Education, Queen's Institute of District Nursing.
- William Gardiner Murchie Dobie, Solicitor, Dumfries.
- Frank Edward Le Vavasseur Dit Durell, Inspector, Board of Inland Revenue.
- Reginald James Dymond, Member, Bristol Savings Committee.
- John Norman Eastwood, Chief Clerk and Accountant, Royal Patriotic Fund Corporation.
- Arthur Hubert Edwards, County Mental Health Officer, Somerset County Council.
- Basil Charles Edwards, Training and Recruitment Officer, Caterers' Association of Great Britain.
- Horace Alexander Edwards, lately Divisional Chief Inspector, Systems Group, The Plessey Company Ltd, Ilford, Essex.
- Allan Henry Ellson, Divisional Manager, Mullard Equipment Ltd, Crawley, Sussex.
- Arthur Edwin Evans, Chairman and Managing Director, Evans Electroselenium Ltd. For services to Export.
- Arthur Joseph Fawcett, Chairman, The Tintometer Ltd, Salisbury, Wiltshire. For services to Export.
- Kenneth James Fawcett, Chief Egg Inspector, Ministry of Agriculture, Fisheries and Food.
- William Herbert Penning, Honorary Secretary, Belfast Branch, Workers' Educational Association.
- James Ferguson, Main Grade (Mechanical & Electrical) Engineer, Ministry of Public Building and Works.
- Robert Ferguson, Bridgemaster (Technical Officer Grade I), Scottish Development Department.
- Madeleine Joan Ferry, Supervisor and Tutor to Trainee and Dental Surgery Assistants, Eastman Dental Hospital.
- Enid Marguerite Fielding, Secretary, The English Association.
- Ernest Fisher. For local government services in Spalding and district.
- John William Footitt, Chief Engineer, MV Melrose Abbey, Transport Holding Company, Associated Humber Lines Ltd.
- Marjorie Anne Ross Fraser, Executive Officer, Ministry of Defence.
- Laurel Jean Agnes Frayling, Lately Director, Overseas Welfare Department, Soldiers', Sailors' and Airmen's Families Association.
- Benjamin Ernest Fruer, Divisional Officer, Auxiliary Fire Service, London Fire Brigade.
- Frank Wilson Furness, JP, Member, North Riding of Yorkshire Agricultural Executive Committee.
- George Alfred Giles, Senior Technical Superintendent, No. 23 Maintenance Unit, RAF Aldergrove, Ministry of Defence (Royal Air Force).
- Emily Maud Glennie, National Savings Street Group Organiser, Cambridge.
- Thomas Eric Godden, Chairman, National Savings South-Eastern Regional Educational Committee.
- Jack Alexander Colder, Assistant Chief Engineer, Instruments Design Office, Engineering Group, Risley, United Kingdom Atomic Energy Authority.
- Leslie Francis Goodenough, Senior Draughtsman, Ministry of Defence (Royal Navy).
- Kathleen Mary Goodes, Controller of Typists (Outstations), Ministry of Technology.
- Neville Stanley Frank Goodridge, Deputy General Secretary, National Association of Boys' Clubs.
- Annie Sinclair Gordon, Assistant Secretary, Northern Regional Hospital Board (Scotland).
- Marie Goyer, Experimental Officer, Ministry of Technology.
- George Robert Gray, Chief Ambulance Officer, East Riding of Yorkshire.
- Captain John Gray, Master, Watchful, Bremner & Company, Stromness.
- Marjorie Grace Gray, Superintendent of Typists, Cabinet Office.
- Ellen Jane Griffith, Superintendent of Maternity Nurses, Hope Hospital, Salford.
- The Reverend Douglas Allen Griffiths. For services to the Methodist Association of Youth Clubs.
- Islwyn Griffiths, Lecturer in Welsh, Monmouthshire College of Education.
- Jean May Grosse, Higher Executive Officer, Board of Trade.
- Jack Beresford Grove, Head of Finances and Administration, Television Enterprises Department, British Broadcasting Corporation.
- Charles Norman Hadlow, Curator, Waterways Museum, Stoke Bruerne, British Waterways Board.
- Wilfrid George Hall, Technical Manager (Naval Armaments), Vickers-Armstrongs North East Works, Newcastle upon Tyne.
- Clifford Harding, Staff Nurse (Part-time), Littlemore Hospital, Oxford.
- Agnes Hildyard Harland. For services to Youth and Women's Organisations in County Durham.
- Helen Kathleen Harris, Headmistress, Leighton Buzzard County Primary Infants' School, Bedfordshire.
- Joseph Harris, Chief Buyer, Beans Industries Ltd, Tipton, Staffordshire.
- Allan Peter Harrison, Divisional Director and Export Manager, Angus Fire Armour Division, George Angus & Company Ltd. For services to Export.
- Molly Harrison, Curator, Geffrye Museum, Shoreditch.
- William Raymond Harrison, Chairman, National Savings East Midland Regional Educational Committee.
- Ernest Arthur Harroway, Chairman, Wolverhampton and District War Pensions Committee.
- Joseph Richard Hawkins, Chief Radio Officer, SS Canberra, Peninsular & Oriental Steam Navigation Company.
- Frank Haworth, JP, Alderman, Bacup Borough Council, Lancashire.
- Allan Brindle Hayhurst, General Secretary-Treasurer, British Deaf and Dumb Association.
- Austin Haywood, Deputy Chief Constable, Leeds City Police.
- Arthur George Lee Hellyer, lately Editor, Amateur Gardening.
- George Henderson, Farmer, Oxfordshire.
- William James Kenwood, Chairman, Tenby Savings Committee.
- Sidney Cecil Hill, GM, Group Secretary, Coventry Hospital Management Committee.
- Richard Gronow Hinks, Appeals Secretary, British Olympic Association and British Commonwealth Games.
- Ivy Louise Hinton, Secretary/Receptionist to General Medical Practitioners in Reading.
- Harold Hobbs, lately Area Engineer, Telephone Manager's Office, Coventry, General Post Office.
- Leslie Richard Hodge, Organisation and Methods Officer, Eastern Gas Board.
- Eileen Cordelia Hogger, Matron, Local Authority Welfare Home, Ipswich.
- Richard Grimshaw Holt, Chairman, Sunderland, Houghton-le-Spring and District War Pensions Committee.
- Joseph Hood, Building Inspector, Scottish Special Housing Association.
- Vincent Krzywiec-Hornich, Transcriber I, Government Communications Headquarters, Foreign Office and Commonwealth Office.
- George Henry Hough, Executive Officer, Department of Education and Science.
- Ronald George Bindon Howell, Schoolmaster, Eastbourne College.
- Elizabeth Howorth, BEM, Chairman, Newburn Savings Committee.
- William Huddleston, Sales Office Manager, The Park Gate Iron & Steel Company, Ltd.
- Ella Hughes, Junior Staff Officer, Ministry, of Health and Social Services for Northern Ireland.
- George Greig Ingram, Chief Superintendent and Deputy Chief Constable, Scottish North-Eastern Counties Constabulary.
- Bobbie Cearn Irvine. For services to Ballroom Dancing.
- William Irvine. For services to Ballroom Dancing.
- John Brian Janney, Company Director and Export Manager, Abel Morrall Ltd. For services to Export.
- Captain James Frederick Johnson, Flight Captain, Blackpool, British United Airways Ltd.
- Christopher John Jolly, JP, Alderman, Colchester Borough Council, Essex.
- Bryn Thomas Jones, Senior Examiner, Board of Inland Revenue.
- Clifford Ellam Jones, lately Clerk of the Northampton Rural District Council.
- Dora Jarrett Herbert-Jones. For services to the public and cultural life of Wales.
- Hilda Edith Jones, Home Help Organiser, City of Liverpool.
- Hilda Marion Jones, Health Visitor, Berkshire County Council.
- Josiah Jones, Alderman, Carmarthenshire County Council.
- Morgan Lewis Jones, Supervising Examiner, North Western Traffic Area, Ministry of Transport.
- Nansi Richards-Jones, Harpist.
- Peter Lloyd Jones, Plant Manager, Plastics Division, Imperial Chemical Industries Ltd. For services to Export.
- Gerard Patrick Jordan, County Youth Officer, Worcestershire.
- Percy Judd, Alderman, Doncaster County Borough Council.
- Robert Reid Keats, Information Officer, Northern Region, Central Office of Information.
- Frederick Allen Kelly, JP, Chairman, Gateshead Disablement Advisory Committee.
- Allan Henry Kerridge, Clerical Officer, Ministry of Public Building and Works.
- Winifred Arnot Kilgour, Secretary to the Institute of Personnel Management.
- William King, Principal, St. Loye's College for the Training and Rehabilitation of the Disabled, Exeter.
- Commander Charles Arthur de Winton Kitcat, lately Inspector, HM Coastguard, North Eastern Division, Board of Trade.
- William George Knibbs, Higher Executive Officer, Ministry of Technology.
- Anne Elisabeth Georgina Knight, Staff Officer, Ministry of Commerce for Northern Ireland.
- James Edmund Knight, Sales Manager, Fertiliser Plant, The Power-Gas Corporation Ltd, Stockton-on-Tees. For services to Export.
- Kenneth Alan Knight. For services to Youth in Reigate, Surrey.
- Sydney James David Knowles, lately Chairman, Bridgnorth Rural District Council, Shropshire.
- Kenneth Augustin Ladds, Senior Executive Officer, Ministry of Power.
- Henry Charles Law, Specialist Assistant to the Technical Sales and Services Director, Smiths Industries Ltd. For services to Export.
- Anthony Basil Leach, Senior Assistant Education Officer, Surrey County Council.
- Margaret Leach, Head of Domestic Food Preservation Section, Agricultural and Horticultural Research Station, Long Ashton, University of Bristol.
- William Alexander Hendry Lemmon, Higher Executive Officer, Ministry of Social Security.
- John Elwyn Lewis, Member, Brecon Agricultural Executive Committee.
- Robert Stanley Liddon, Head of Publicity Division, The Royal Society for the Prevention of Accidents.
- Allan Stephenson Parker Lightbody. For services to the community in Lurgan, County Armagh.
- Clara Olive Lipscombe, Superintendent, King Hill Hostel, West Mailing, Kent.
- Wilfrid Scott Lough. For services towards the improved distribution of meat.
- Charles John Low, Chief Preventive Officer, Board of Customs and Excise.
- Frederick James Lowans, Experimental Manager, Precision. Engineering Division, Short Brothers & Harland Ltd, Belfast.
- David Haigh Lunn, Senior Technical Representative, Platt Brothers (Sales) Ltd.
- Ronald William John Lynch, Higher Executive Officer, Ministry of Social Security.
- Thora Lillie McCarthy. For services to the Girl Guides Association.
- William George McCune, Executive Officer, Ministry of Transport.
- Walter Roderick McKay McGowan. For services to Boxing.
- Agnes McKee, Private Secretary to The Chairman, Ulster Transport Authority.
- Captain James McKinnon, lately Commander, Fishery Cruiser Norna.
- Margaret Florence McLaren, Administrative Assistant, Finance, British Broadcasting Corporation.
- Alexander McLean, Chief Superintendent, Metropolitan Police.
- William Frederick Trousdale McMordie, JP, Chairman, North Down Rural District Council.
- Winifred Florence Madders, lately Clerical Officer, Home Office.
- Christina Malcolm. For services to the community in Eskdalemuir, Dumfriesshire.
- Douglas Arnold Marshall, Manager, Newport (Isle of Wight) Area Office, Supplementary Benefits Commission, Ministry of Social Security.
- James David Martin, Area Engineer, North of Scotland Hydro-Electric Board.
- William Colin Maycock, Surveyor, Board of Customs and Excise.
- Beatrix Eleanor Mead, Personal Secretary to the Keeper of Manuscripts, British Museum.
- William Wharton Mensforth, Chief Superintendent, Lancashire Constabulary.
- Charles Beech Mills, General Secretary, Sand and Gravel Association of Great Britain.
- Helen Moeller, Information Officer, Ministry of Housing and Local Government.
- Robert Muir, District Manager, South of Scotland Electricity Board.
- Basil Broomfield Murdy, District Commandant, Ulster Special Constabulary.
- Esther Mary Murphy, Senior Executive Officer, Ministry of Overseas Development.
- Margaret Neenan, Matron, Bromsgrove Cottage Hospital, Worcestershire.
- John George Nicholson, Purser, Esso Exeter, Esso Petroleum Company Ltd.
- Edward Joseph Nicol, Regional Officer, Midland Region, National Council of Social Service.
- Betty Helen Wilmet Nimmo, Secretary, Royal Naval and Royal Marine Children's Home, Waterlooville, Hampshire.
- Elsie Louise Noble, Matron, Dreadnought Seamen's Hospital, Greenwich.
- John William Oakeley, Senior Executive Officer, Ministry of Social Security.
- Edmund James Orchard, Installation Manager, Towler Brothers (Patents) Ltd. For services to Export.
- Horace Vernon Overington, BEM, Dean's Virger, St. Paul's Cathedral.
- Dorothy Maud Owen, Director, County School of Music, Guildford.
- Gareth William Owen. For services to Snooker.
- Harold Parnham, Manager, Technical Sales Department and Chief Assistant to Commercial Director, General Refractories Ltd. For services to Export.
- Edward Henry Parsons, lately City Marshal and Mayor's Secretary, Gloucester.
- Albert Jack Payne, Civil Assistant to Medical Director-General, Ministry of Defence (Royal Navy).
- Arthur Charles Pearce, Deputy Chief Male Nurse, Broadmoor Hospital, Ministry of Health.
- Mary Harriet Phillimore, Attached Ministry of Defence.
- Garfield Clifford Phillips, Wales Representative, Press Association.
- Major Herbert James Phillips, Senior Training Officer, Ministry of Labour.
- George Pickerill, Higher Executive Officer, Board of Inland Revenue.
- Vivian Mary Pinkerton (Mrs. Beswick), Headmistress, Haughton Hall Residential Special School, Shifnal, Shropshire.
- Brian Allen Pook. For services to the training of journalists.
- Hasel Marjorie Popjak, Managing Editor, British Medical Bulletin, British Council.
- Muriel Jessie Preece, lately Member, Runcorn Development Corporation.
- Henry Prest, Member, Hetton Urban District Council.
- John Lewis James Price, Clerk to the Taf Fechan Water Board.
- Leonard Price, Traffic Manager, Red & White Services Ltd, Transport Holding Company.
- Dorothy Pummell, Road Safety Officer, Barking.
- Gwyneth Myra Rees. For services to Music in Wales.
- Amato Renucci, Principal Teacher of Mathematics and Deputy Headmaster, St. Columba's Roman Catholic Secondary School, Glasgow.
- Captain Harry Martin Revill, Master, Trinity House Pilot Vessel Service, Corporation of Trinity House.
- William Clifford Richards, District Secretary, South West Wales Management Committee, Amalgamated Society of Wood-workers.
- Norman Maurice Richardson, Professor of Music, Royal Air Force School of Music, Uxbridge.
- Walter Burton Richardson, JP, Member, Scarborough, Bridlington, Malton & Whitby Group Hospital Management Committee.
- Florence Arthur Rigg, Chief Experimental Officer, Weapons Group, Aldermaston, United Kingdom Atomic Energy Authority.
- Leonard Hector Robinson, BEM, lately Technical Officer Grade I, Telecommunications Engineering Establishment, Board of Trade.
- Wilmot Jack Roe, Chief Assistant Engineer, County Surveyor's Department, Nottingham.
- Edward Arthur Rogers, Assistant Signal and Telecommunications Engineer (Modernisation), British Railways Board.
- Elinor Mabel Capon Roper, District Agricultural Adviser Grade II, National Agricultural Advisory Service.
- Robert Roscoe. For social services in Ormskirk.
- Captain Edward Roger Rowlands, Harbour Master, Barrow-in-Furness, British Transport Docks Board.
- Ernest William Rowntree, Managing Director, Bonas Brothers Weavematic Looms (England) Ltd. For services to Export.
- Surgeon Captain Robert Spencer Rudland, VRD, MRCS, LRCP, Royal Naval Reserve, Chairman, Coventry Sea Cadet Corps Unit Committee.
- Thomas Alexander Russell, District Inspector, Royal Ulster Constabulary.
- Samuel James Sellwood, Executive Engineer, Radio Planning and Provision Branch, General Post Office.
- Donald Theodore Sernberg, Land Agent, Directorate of Lands, Far East, Ministry of Defence (Army).
- Edith Shearstone, lately Headmistress, Waverley Infants School, Doncaster.
- Leonard Thomas Shipman, Commandant, Central Division, Leicester and Rutland Special Constabulary.
- Robert John Simms, JP, Chairman, Newtownabbey Local Savings Committee.
- Edward Frederick Goulder Skinner, Chairman, Southwark War Pensions Committee.
- Robert Arnold Slater, Manager, London Railway Road Service, Eastern Region, British Railways Board.
- Gerald Arthur Smith, Technical Officer, Grade "A", Office of the Receiver for the Metropolitan Police District.
- Muriel Anne Smith, Community Development Officer, London Council of Social Service.
- Robert Lawson Smith, Sales Superintendent, Telephone Manager's Office, Sheffield, General Post Office.
- William Herbert Smith, Alderman, Scarborough Borough Council.
- Clifford James Snell, Senior Executive Officer, Ministry of Social Security.
- Walter Henry Soundy, Assistant Executive Engineer, London, General Post Office.
- Lilian Doris Squires, Higher Executive Officer, Ministry of Agriculture, Fisheries-and Food.
- Frank John Stevens, Member, Surrey Advisory Committee, Southern Region Supplementary Benefits Commission.
- William Fordyce Stewart, Director of Training and Education, Strathmartine Hospital, Dundee.
- Marjorie Frances Stonebridge, lately Grade 4 Officer, Ministry of Labour.
- Josephine Margaret Storey, Sister-in-Charge, Chronic Haemodialysis Unit, Fulham, Charing Cross Hospital Group.
- Raymond Edward Toole-Stott, Librarian and Departmental Records Officer, HM Procurator General and Treasury Solicitor.
- Thomas Ellery Stuart, Field Officer Grade I (Pests), Ministry of Agriculture, Fisheries and Food.
- John Barry Cotter Swinney, Probation Officer, Inner London Probation Area.
- Graver Emanuel Tagholm, Engineer-in-Charge, Transmitting Station, Croydon, Independent Television Authority.
- Joseph Lamb Taylor. For services to the community in Ashington, Northumberland.
- Squadron Leader William Henry Taylor, Chairman, No. 169 (1st Plymouth) Squadron Committee, Air Training Corps.
- Samuel Geoffrey Temple, Technical Manager and Chief Inspector, Copper Division, Imperial Metal Industries (Kynoch) Ltd.
- Thomas Watkin Thomas, Group Pharmacist, Norwich, Lowestoft and Great Yarmouth Hospital Management Committee.
- Frances Muriel Eileen Thompson. For welfare services to the Mediterranean Garrisons Centre, Little Aden.
- John Thompson. For social services in Belfast.
- George Thomas Tippett, Secretary, London Area Transport Users Consultative Committee.
- Kenneth Todd, Assistant Head of External Services Programme Operations, British Broadcasting Corporation.
- James Cornelius Toft, JP, Councillor, Whitley Bay Borough Council, Northumberland.
- Frank Tooby, Church Army Evangelist, HM Prison, Winchester.
- Katharine Towers, JP, Member, Londonderry Hospital Management Committee.
- Eva Mary Townrow, Matron, Standon Bowers Special School, Stafford.
- Kathleen Trewick, Headmistress, Eagle House Approved School for Boys, Bath.
- William Robert Trickey, JP, lately Mayor of Tiverton, Devon.
- William Henry Tuck, Manager, Orthopaedic Appliances Department, Royal National Orthopaedic Hospital.
- Manuel Valarino, Local Assistant, General Manager's Department, HM Dockyard Gibraltar.
- Bernard George Samuel Vickers, lately Head Postmaster, The Hartlepools Head Post Office, West Hartlepool.
- Alfred Wainwright, Compiler of Pictorial Guide to the Lakeland Fells.
- Alexander Walker, Mechanical and Electrical Engineer, Ministry of Public Building and Works.
- Gertrude Walker, Chairman, Irlam Savings Committee.
- Robert Gwynne Wall, Regional Horticultural Officer, Northern Region, Commonwealth War Graves Commission.
- Edna Annie Wallis, Headmistress, Shelton Street Infants School, Nottingham.
- Ernest Charles Walton, Head of the Department of Electrical Engineering and Physics, Leeds College of Technology.
- Herbert Ward, Senior Executive Officer, Department of Economic Affairs.
- Leonard Albert Ward, Commercial Manager, Small Engines Division, Bristol Siddeley Engines Ltd. For services to Export.
- Ralph Robert Warnes, Chief Land Surveyor, Opencast Executive, National Coal Board.
- James Watson, Chief Forester, Forestry Commission for Scotland.
- Horace Hector Watts, Joint Managing Director, Beasley, French & Company Ltd, Bristol. For services to Export.
- Percy John Webb, Chairman, Supplementary Benefits Tribunal, King's Lynn.
- Bessie Wenn, Headmistress, Pear Tree Infants' School, Derby.
- Norah Kathleen Marie Wheadon, Peoples Deputy, Guernsey.
- David Herbert White. Member, Westmorland Agricultural Executive Committee.
- John Whiteside. For services to the Post Office Retired Officers' Association (Blackpool Branch).
- Edward John Whitney, Hospital Secretary, Poole General Hospital.
- Alderman William Henry Wilkey, JP, lately Mayor of Barnstaple, Devon.
- Muriel Wilkinson, lately Matron, Meathop Hospital, Grange-over-Sands, Lancashire.
- Alderman William Wilkinson, JP, Chairman, Chatham and District Local Employment Committee.
- William Charles Wills, Chief Clerk, General Council of the Bar of England and Wales.
- John Wilson, Public Lighting Engineer, Burgh of Paisley.
- Molly Kathleen Tunnicliffe Wilson, lately Matron, Birch Hill Hospital, Rochdale, Lancashire.
- Meriel Ruth Withall, Under-Secretary, National Federation of Women's Institutes.
- Harry Owen Wood, Honorary Secretary, Andover Rural District Savings Committee.
- Mary Barbara Woodhead, BEM, Deputy County Organiser, Derbyshire, Women's Royal Voluntary Service.
- Arthur Herbert Woolford, Chairman, Chelmsford and District War Pensions Committee.
- Ernest Morris Worthington. For services to the Church Lads' Brigade.
- James Edward Yapp, lately Assistant Chief Officer, Birmingham Fire Brigade.
- Roland Ernest York, Works Manager, A. A. Jones & Shipman Ltd, Leicester.
- Andrew Ramsay Young, Clerk and Solicitor, Dundee Harbour Trust.

Diplomatic Service and Overseas List

- Elizabeth Jean Alderman, Nursing Sister to Lepers in Eastern Region, Nigeria.
- Gwendoline Constance Gething Andrade, Director of Studies, British Institute, Oporto.
- Robert Charles Andrew, Consular Clerk and Archivist, Her Majesty's Consulate-General, Seattle.
- The Reverend Andrew Baillie, Vicar, St. Andrew's Church, Colombo.
- Colin Barlow, Head of Economic and Planning Division, Rubber Research Institute, Malaya.
- Lionel Charles Baxter, lately Under Secretary, Ministry of Establishments and Training, Kaduna, Northern Region, Nigeria.
- Narain Boodhna, lately Senior Stock Verifier, Accountant-General's Division, Ministry of Finance, Mauritius.
- Derek James Bradfield, Principal Extension Programmes Officer, Ministry of Natural Resources, Malawi.
- Kathleen Maud Brain, Head Mistress, Girls' Boarding School, Baptist Mission, Ngombe Lutete, Kongo-Central.
- John Douglas Grenville Walker-Brash, Head of Post, British Government Office, Edmonton.
- Grace Brisley, Matron, Victoria Home, Paris.
- Kathleen Eunice Cheung, Senior Education Officer, Hong Kong.
- Cheung Yan-lung, JP. For public services in Hong Kong.
- Gerard Maurice Clarke, Superintendent of Prisons, Dominica.
- Petronella Margaret Collon, British Subject resident in Belgium.
- Joan Comber, British Subject resident in Mexico.
- Edgar Stanley Cridge, British Subject resident in Chile.
- Captain Ellis Nathaniel Curling, JP, Acting Commissioner, Ragged Island, Out Island Affairs Department, Bahamas.
- Joseph Anthony Danino, Chief Administrative Assistant, Gibraltar City Council.
- John Davidson, Honorary British Vice-Consul, Guaymas, State of Sonora, Mexico.
- Gwen Gardner Davies. For services to education in the British Solomon Islands Protectorate.
- William Raymond Denley, BEM, Fire Expert, Mehrabad Airport, Tehran.
- Louis Aimé Désiré, Assistant Secretary, Mauritius.
- Malvina Adina Donovan, Matron, Peebles Hospital, Road Town, Virgin Islands.
- Leonard George Edwards, Assistant Director of Prisons, Nigeria.
- Clara Eileen Flannery, lately Provincial Inspector of Education, Northern Region, Nigeria.
- Clifford Daniel St. Quentin Fletcher, Senior Police Training Officer, Hong Kong.
- Barbara Elizabeth Maud Garratt, Confidential Secretary, British High Commission, Aden.
- Aired Georges, Chief Income Tax Officer, Seychelles.
- Donald Jeffrey Gibson, Her Majesty's Consul, Chiengmai.
- Florence Glean, Island Commissioner for Girl Guides, Grenada.
- Evelyn Elsie Grist, Assistant Secretary, Ministry of Education, Health and Social Affairs, Saint Lucia.
- James Gordon Grove, Assistant Superintendent, Officer in Charge of Prisons, Bahrain State Police.
- Stella Halsall. For services to the community in Bermuda.
- Keith Harold Hatherly, Head of Department of Mathematics, Nigerian College of Arts, Science and Technology, Enugu, Eastern Region, Nigeria.
- Ernest John William Hendry, Principal Establishments Officer, Malawi.
- Mary Brigid Teresa Hennessy, Nursing Sister, Office of the British Chargé d'Affaires, Peking.
- Edward Henry House, Passenger Manager, Nigeria Airways Corporation, Jos.
- John Abercrombie Howatson, Chief Superintendent of Police, Nigeria.
- Probyn Elsworth Inniss, Permanent Secretary, Establishments, Saint Christopher-Nevis-Anguilla.
- Mrs. Jagannath. For services to the community in Fiji.
- Geoffrey Clifford Johnson, lately Senior Architect, Building Division, Ministry of Works and Transport, Western Region, Nigeria.
- Kathleen Johnston, Grade 10 Officer, lately Her Majesty's Embassy, Prague.
- Jacob Jones, JP. For services to the community of San Salvador, Bahamas.
- Rais Yusaf Hassan al Kathiri, Junior Assistant Adviser, Residency, Eastern Aden Protectorate.
- Tom Macauley, Visa Officer, Her Majesty's Embassy, Prague.
- Joseph Hunt Major, JP, Headmaster, Sandilands School, New Providence. For services to education and to the community in the Bahamas.
- Florence Catherine McInnes, Shorthand-Typist, lately Her Majesty's Embassy, Montevideo.
- Sybil lone McLaughlin, Clerk of the Legislative Assembly and of the Executive Council, Cayman Islands.
- Ernest Wellington Meighan, Housing Officer, British Honduras.
- Colin Frederick Miller, Her Majesty's Vice-Consul, Florence.
- Joyce Molyneux, Personal Assistant to the Minister of State, United Kingdom Mission to the United Nations, New York.
- Thomas Richardson Murray, lately Adviser on Hides and Skins to Governments of Iran and Iraq.
- Nancy Orpe, MVO, Private Secretary to Her Majesty's Ambassador, Bonn.
- Kathleen Margaret-Ann Plunkett, lately Personal Assistant to Regional Information Officer, British Information Services, Bombay.
- William Phillip Ragg. For services to sport in Fiji.
- Josefa Emosi Rigamoto, MM. Administrative Officer, Class IIB, Fiji.
- Henry Robertson, Chief Internal Auditor, Electricity Corporation, Nigeria.
- Eileen Mary Robinson, Personal Secretary to Cultural Attache, Her Majesty's Embassy, Prague.
- Henry Augustus Rogers, Second Secretary (Commercial), British High Commission, Kaduna.
- Kathleen Elizabeth Rogers, Shorthand-Typist, lately Office of the Political Resident, Bahrain.
- George Frederick Rowland, Principal Education Officer, Northern Region, Nigeria.
- Kathleen Edith Scott, Senior Clerk, British High Commission, Canberra.
- Hugh McIntosh Stewart, British Vice-Consul, Baltimore.
- Francis Edward Stones, MVO, lately Senior Technical Officer, Western Region, Nigeria.
- Sheila Winifred Storry, Director of Red Cross, Kano Province, Nigeria.
- Samson Sun. For services to the community in Hong Kong.
- Tom Dennis Sykes, Chief Mechanical Engineer, Public Works Department, Sarawak, Malaysia.
- Kenneth William Taylor, lately Nurse Tutor, City Hospital, Kano.
- James Lionel O'Neil Tedder, Administrative Officer, Class B, British Solomon Islands Protectorate.
- Elizabeth Strachan Terrell, Archivist, Her Majesty's Consulate-General, Atlanta.
- Agnes Speed Thomas, Section Head, British Information Services, Nicosia.
- Louis Joseph Clovis Vellin, Education Officer, Mauritius. For voluntary services, especially to the Young Farmers' movement.
- Lilian Mason Vickers, Principal Education Officer, Northern Region, Nigeria.
- Peter Paul Watkins, Commercial Officer, Her Majesty's Embassy, Mexico City.
- Harold Clare White, First Secretary (Commercial) and Her Majesty's Consul, Her Majesty's Embassy, Kinshasa.
- Edmund Wilson, Vice Principal, Government Secondary School, Afikpo, Eastern Region, Nigeria.
- Brian Woodhead, Principal Agricultural Officer, Bornu, Northern Region, Nigeria.
- Maurice Wong Ping-kin. For services to the under-privileged and especially to young people in Hong Kong.
- Mary Elizabeth Zackheim, Director of Office Management, British Information Services, New York.
- Maroula Alecou Zenonos, Assistant Registrar, Her Majesty's Court of the Sovereign Base Areas of Akrotiri and Dhekelia.
- Andrew Mahubulwana Kunene, Swazi member of Public Service Commission. For public services in Swaziland.
- Joan Frances Scutt, Missionary. For services to education and to the Community, particularly in remote areas in Swaziland.

State of New South Wales

- William Charles Batt, Lately Shire Clerk of Shoalhaven.
- Sister Mary Vicente Finn. For services to the community, particularly to the aged and sick.
- James Joseph Griffin. For services ts the community.
- John Harold Kaye. For services to the community, particularly to youth.
- Kerwin Maegraith. For services to the community.
- Mary Elizabeth Miller. For charitable services to the community.
- Alfred George Mole. For services to the community.
- Dawn Trezise Grayson Paton. For services to the welfare of the community.
- Florence Anne Stinson. For services to the community.

State of Victoria

- Sylvia Blogg, of East Malvern. For services to the community.
- Francis James Eric Gyngell, of Elwood. For welfare services to disabled returned ex-servicemen.
- Alan Hall, JP, President of the Shire of Morwell.
- Joseph Paul Larkings. For welfare services to the community, particularly as President of the Committee of Management of the Wangaratta District Base Hospital.
- Kathleen Perrin Governor, Fairlea Women's Prison, Melbourne.
- Martin Patrick Smith, JP, Mayor of the City of Prahan.
- Isobel Strahan, formerly Almoner, Royal Women's Hospital.
- Councillor Vincent Edmund Vibert, JP, of Shepparton. For services to the community, particularly in local government and education.
- Councillor Arthur Ernest Walsh, of St. Arnaud. For services to the community, especially in the field of local government and welfare services.

State of Queensland

- Kate Crowley. For services in the field of nursing.
- George Walter Coombs. For services to the dairying industry.
- Leo Michael John Feenaghty. For services to the Queensland Public Service.
- Angus de Salis Nicolson. For services to the tourist industry.
- Constance Rouse, lately Secretary in the Governor's Office, Brisbane.
- Rory Cedric James Sallows. For. services in the Queensland Public Service.
- Doric Barnes Tabart. For social welfare services in Central Western Queensland.
- Dafydd Llewellyn Stanley Williams. For services to the community, particularly in the field of first aid.

State of South Australia

- Maud Cain, JP. For social welfare services to the community.
- Isabel Harriet Fatchen. For social welfare services to the community.
- Ronald Keen, JP. Mayor of Marion Corporation.
- Florence Maud McCrorie. For services to the community particularly in the field of mental illness.

State of Western Australia

- Ernest Oscar Lange, JP. For services to the community, particularly in the field of education.
- Sydney Alfred Macnamara, JP. For services to the community especially ex-servicemen.

State of Tasmania

- Eleanor Eileen Carey. For services to the community.
- The Honourable Eric Richard Aldred Howroyd, JP, Chairman of the Trustees, Hobart Botanical Gardens

=== Order of the Companions of Honour (CH) ===
- Sir Arthur Wynne Morgan Bryant, CBE, Historian.
- Brigadier-General Sir Harold Hartley, GCVO, CBE, MC. For services in Scientific and public affairs.
- The Right Honourable James Scott Cumberland, Baron Reid. A Lord of Appeal in Ordinary.

=== Companion of the Imperial Service Order (ISO) ===
Home Civil Service

- Robert Saxelby Alcock, Principal, Board of Trade.
- George Alexander, Superintending Valuer, Board of Inland Revenue.
- Thomas Wilson Buchan, MB, ChB, Regional Medical Officer, Scottish Home and Health Department.
- James Lewis Carroll, Constructor (Retired) Ministry of Defence (Royal Navy).
- Eric Briscall Carter, Senior Mechanical and Electrical Engineer, Ministry of Public Building and Works.
- Francis Samuel Thomas Cleave, Director of Supply and Transport, Home Office.
- Clarence Henry Cumberland, Engineer I, Directorate of Aircraft Equipment Production, Ministry of Technology.
- Wallace Farmery, Chief Executive Officer, Government Communications Headquarters, Foreign Office.
- Arthur George Forsdyke, Senior Principal Scientific Officer, Meteorological Office, Ministry of Defence (Royal Air Force).
- Elwyri Thomas Griffiths, Principal Inspector of Taxes, Board of Inland Revenue.
- Robert Arthur Harrison, lately Telegraph Manager, Post Office Overseas Telegraphs.
- Reginald Clifford Hinton, Principal, Ministry of Agriculture, Fisheries and Food.
- Lawrence William Nicholson Homan, Principal, Ministry of Agriculture, Fisheries and Food.
- Goronwy Tobit Huws, Assistant Regional Controller, Central Office for Wales, Ministry of Social Security.
- Hugh Kerr Macrorie, Senior Ship Surveyor, Board of Trade.
- Vivian Ernest Saunders Mitchell, lately Deputy Director, Administration and Services, National Gas Turbine Establishment.
- James Pope, Senior Chief Executive Officer, Ministry of Defence (Army).
- William Lowry Russell, Chief Experimental Officer, Road Research Laboratory, Ministry of Transport.
- Richard Kingsley Smerdon, Superintending Estate Surveyor, Ministry of Public Building and Works.
- Leslie Surman, Grade 2 Officer, Ministry of Labour.
- Joseph Evenor Paul Louis Vigoureux, Senior Principal Scientific Officer, Ministry of Technology.

Diplomatic Service and Overseas List

- Dillett Hartman Burrows, MBE, Chief Out Islands Commissioner, Ministry of Out Island Affairs, Bahamas.
- Frederick Ernest Moore Warner, MBE, lately Registrar of Co-operatives, Fiji.
- Wong Hui-yin, lately Chinese Literary Clerk, Hong Kong.

State of Victoria

- James Harold Aldred, lately Permanent Head of Department of Public Works, Victoria.

State of Tasmania

- Horace Lyall Duke, Director of Housing and Permanent Head of Housing Department.

=== British Empire Medal (BEM) ===
Military Division
Royal Navy

- Chief Petty Officer (PRI) Frederick Charles Arthur Ball, P/JX159136.
- Quartermaster Sergeant Edward-Percy Chipps, RMV 200030, Royal Marines Reserve.
- Chief Petty Officer (GI) Graham Collard Cooper, P/JX766480.
- Chief Engine Room Artificer John Couch, P/MX818541.
- Chief Communication Yeoman Desmond Frank Crook, P/JX541805.
- Chief Mechanician William Else, P/KX86422.
- Chief Mechanician James England, D/KX745096.
- Chief Electrician James Albert Gibson, P/MX769256.
- Chief Petty Officer (Coxswain) Alan Graham, D/JX836510.
- Master-at-Arms Samuel James Gregory, P/MX715712.
- Chief Petty Officer (PT.1) Frank Hart, P/JX161746.
- Chief Petty Officer Medical Assistant John Randolph Hawkins, P/MX52670.
- Aircrewman (1st Class) John Penrhyn Heather, L/FX670672.
- Chief Communication Yeoman Peter Holdsworth, P/JX371396.
- Chief Petty Officer (GI) James Cyril Jeffries, D/JX134793.
- Chief Engine Room Artificer Arthur Simmons Knowler, P/MXS69343.
- Chief Radio Electrical Artificer Michael Anthony Lang, P/M928789.
- Chief Petty Officer Steward Leung Chiu, O.1825.
- Chief Ordnance Electrical Artificer (L) Derrick Cecil Middleton, P/MX73835.
- Staff Bandmaster Leonard Alfred William Negus, RMB/X2877, Royal Marines.
- Chief Petty Officer Writer Benjamin Oakes, D/MX840555. Formerly serving with the British Joint Services Training Team, Ghana.
- Colour Sergeant Job James Rawlinson, CH/X4322, Royal Marines.
- Chief Petty Officer Medical Assistant Cyril Rees, D/MX78774.
- Regulating Chief Wren Jean Mary Smith, 80771, Women's Royal Naval Service.
- Chief Petty Officer Cook (S) Joseph Stewart, P/MX71162.
- Grade I Rose Tattersall, PHW/2, Women's Royal Naval Reserve.
- Chief Engine Room Artificer Louis Thompson, P/MXS11001.
- Chief Aircraft Artificer (A/E) Ronald Geoffrey Vinall, L/FX669883.
- Chief Petty Officer (Steward) Horace Webster, D/LX888135.
- Chief Petty Officer (Engineering Mechanic) William Henry White, P/KX834616. Formerly on loan to the Royal Malaysian Navy.

Army

- 22256934 Staff Sergeant (Pipe Major) David Waddell Aitken, The Royal Highland Fusiliers (Princess Margaret's Own Glasgow and Ayrshire Regiment).
- 19033282 Staff Sergeant (acting) David John Allen, The Royal Inniskilling Fusiliers.
- W/54699 Sergeant (acting) Phyllis Bronwyn Beuzeval, Women's Royal Army Corps.
- 14848894 Sergeant Roy Louis Frederick Biggs, The Parachute Regiment.
- 23549116 Sergeant Charles Blyth, The Parachute Regiment.
- 22275559 Staff Sergeant (acting) William Henry Boseley, Corps of Royal Electrical and Mechanical Engineers.
- 22523672 Staff Sergeant Hugh Michael Cooper, Royal Corps of Transport.
- 22471240 Sergeant Albert Cross, Corps of Royal Electrical and Mechanical Engineers.
- 23343950 Corporal David Owen Cunningham, Intelligence Corps.
- 22523201 Staff Sergeant (acting) William Henry Davies, The Welch Regiment.
- 22269195 Staff Sergeant George Frederick Desforges, lately Corps of Royal Engineers, Territorial Army.
- 22149915 Warrant Officer Class II (acting) James Ernest Dugmore, lately Army Catering Corps, Territorial Army.
- 22260289 Staff Sergeant Raymond Thomas Dukamp, lately Royal Regiment of Artillery, Territorial Army.
- 14459541 Staff Sergeant Alexander Robert Durham, The Durham Light Infantry (now retired).
- 22827511 Staff Sergeant Donald Eraser, Corps of Royal Engineers.
- 19028386 Staff Sergeant (acting) Bernard Thomas Gale, Royal Army Medical Corps.
- 326226 Warrant Officer Class II (local) Frank William Harris, lately The Queen's Own Yorkshire Yeomanry, Royal Armoured Corps, Territorial Army.
- 22915542 Sergeant Brian Francis Higgs, lately Royal Regiment of Artillery, Territorial Army.
- 22246275 Staff Sergeant Thomas Hill, Corps of Royal Engineers.
- 23230328 Staff Sergeant Robert Hope, Royal Corps of Transport.
- 23518175 Staff Sergeant Albert Victor Howley, lately The Royal Gloucestershire Hussars, Royal Armoured Corps, Territorial Army.
- 21003430 Staff Sergeant James George Jones, lately Royal Regiment of Artillery, Territorial Army.
- 21132993 Sergeant Kale Gurung, Gurkha Transport Regiment.
- 22526312 Staff Sergeant Godfrey Montague Keeffe, Corps of Royal Engineers.
- 22781714 Corporal William George McNicol, lately The Royal Inniskilling Fusiliers, Territorial Army.
- 22802184 Sergeant William Henry Moss, lately The Royal Hampshire Regiment, Territorial Army.
- 22512580 Staff Sergeant James Murray, lately Royal Army Medical Corps, Territorial Army:
- 23251336 Corporal Alan James Oldham, Royal Corps of Signals.
- 23428608 Corporal (acting) William Price, The Cheshire Regiment.
- 23228729 Warrant Officer Class I (acting) Randolph Evan. Irvine Reid, Royal Army Medical Corps.
- 22388270 Staff Sergeant Edwin Sidebottom, Royal Army Ordnance Corps.
- LS/1152292 Warrant Officer Class II (local) Frank Smith, Royal Regiment of Artillery.
- 4207267 Staff Sergeant William Street, The Royal Welch Fusiliers.
- LS/4533292 Sergeant Samuel Whitfield, The King's Own Yorkshire Light Infantry.
- 22215390 Staff Sergeant (local) David Young, Scots Guards.

Royal Air Force

- H1437494 Flight Sergeant George Charles Akers, RAF Regiment.
- K4005590 Flight Sergeant Daniel Fogarty.
- M1872227 Flight Sergeant Frederick James Fullom.
- P1054459 Flight Sergeant Edward Garry.
- R1458724 Flight Sergeant Albert Arthur Hanks, RAF Regiment.
- C2275667 Flight Sergeant Emrys Emlyn Eric Jarvis.
- G4007466 Flight Sergeant Patrick Conleth McCann. For services while on loan to the Kenya Air Force.
- L3511381 Acting Flight Sergeant Leslie Frank Climo.
- B3046020 Acting Flight Sergeant Hector MacMillan.
- W0572719 Acting Flight Sergeant George Anthony Steel.
- X0584629 Chief Technician Keith Burrows.
- J4002081 Chief Technician Ronald Harry Finch. For services with the British Joint Services Training Team, Ghana.
- A1922023 Chief Technician Dennis Roy Fisk.
- V3500316 Chief Technician James Smith Henderson.
- X0625674 Chief Technician Lionel Holloway.
- C1920541 Chief Technician Peter Llewellyn Howell.
- M0575647 Chief Technician Gordon Arthur Lots.
- M0586927 Chief Technician Peter Roy Potter.
- J4003902 Chief Technician George Frederick Raggett.
- V0564811 Chief Technician Ernest Sidney Reeves.
- B0563748 Chief Technician James Robertson Skene.
- Q0615208 Chief Technician Cecil George Stagey.
- 796059 Sergeant Alfred Bartolo.
- E3106434 Sergeant Peter David Clarke.
- B4052867 Sergeant John Philip Holmes.
- L4047984 Sergeant William Hettle Innes.
- Y3502695 Sergeant Raymond William Jarrold.
- J2459753 Sergeant Neil Jones.
- V4178859 Sergeant Brian Martin.
- C1925256 Sergeant Terence James O'Carroll.
- Y0639183 Sergeant William Cuthbertson Shennan.
- B1164270 Sergeant Brian Wathen White.
- Y1036822 Sergeant George Oliver White.
- U4152293 Acting Sergeant Barrie Hopkins.
- X3527644 Corporal Douglas Edward Balmer.
- F4154966 Corporal Patrick John Casling.
- C5028652 Corporal Roger John Griffiths.
- S4241983 Corporal Gavin William Meikle. For services while on loan to the Zambia Air Force.

Civil Division
United Kingdom

- George Edward William Abbott, Head Shunter (Goods), New England Depot, British Railways Board.
- Donald Alfred Douglas Allen, Senior Assistant (Civil Defence), East Midlands Electricity Board, Nottingham.
- William Armstrong, Chief Inspector and Deputy Chief Constable, Inverness Burgh Police.
- Reginald Clarence Babington, Head Messenger, HM Dockyard, Chatham.
- Edward Banks, Surface Worker, Staindrop Field House Colliery, No. 4 Area, Northumberland and Durham Division, National Coal Board.
- Raymond Edward Bartholomew, Warrant Officer, No. 120 (Hendon) Squadron, Air Training Corps.
- George Denning Bate, Chargehand Carpenter, Tardebigge, British Waterways Board.
- Joshua Bell, Senior Marine Survey Assistant, Belfast, Board of Trade.
- William Edward Benbow, Head Storekeeper, Royal Society for the Prevention of Accidents.
- John Beston, Tyre Builder, Firestone Tyre & Rubber Company Ltd, Brentford.
- James George Henry Betts, Agricultural Chargehand, Ministry of Public Building and Works.
- Trevor Thomas Bingham, Engine Fitter Foreman, Ministry of Public Building and Works.
- Kathleen Bishop, Storekeeper (Clothing), London Region, Women's Royal Voluntary Service.
- Helen Bisset, Foster-mother, North Kessock, Black Isle, Ross-shire.
- Alexander Black, Turner, Springfields Works, United Kingdom Atomic Energy Authority.
- Beatrice May Blair, Honorary Collector, Village Savings Group, Great Burdon, County Durham.
- Benjamin David Bodinham, Packing Case Maker, No. 7 Maintenance Unit, Ministry of Defence (Royal Air Force).
- Robert Arthur Bolton, Process and General Supervisory Grade II, Aeroplane and Armament Experimental Establishment, Ministry of Technology.
- Edward Reader Booth, Commandant, South Yorkshire Branch, British Red Cross Society.
- John William Bouskill, District Relief Signalman, Leeds, British Railways Board.
- Enoch Bradley, Carpenter, Shaw Savill Line.
- George Henry Briggs, Process and General Supervisory Grade IV, Rocket Propulsion Establishment, Ministry of Technology.
- Thomas Carswell Brown, Foreman Welder, Harland & Wolff Ltd, Belfast.
- Ernest William Brownrigg, Shepherd. For services to sheep breeding and husbandry.
- William John Henry Burford, Chargeman of Skilled Labourers, Ministry of Defence (Royal Navy).
- Ida Frances Butler, Commandant, West Lancashire Branch, British Red Cross Society.
- Neil Campbell, Ferryman, South Uist, Barra and Eriskay.
- Basil Victor Carolan, Leading Projectionist, Royal Air Force College, Cranwell, Ministry of Defence (Royal Air Force).
- Ellen Carter, Foster-mother, West Suffolk County Council.
- Lily Catherine Carter, Honorary Collector, Street Savings Group, Hayes, Middlesex.
- Walter Catlow, Superintendent, Chatham Factory, C.A.V. Ltd.
- Charles Caush, Inspector, Cleansing and Transport Department, Tynemouth County Borough Council.
- Alfred George Watts Chamberlain, Non-Technical Grade II, Harwell, United Kingdom Atomic Energy Authority.
- Ernest Edward Chandler, Technical Class Grade II, Ministry of Defence (Navy).
- George Chapman, Group Scout Master at Meanwood Park (Mental) Hospital, Leeds.
- Gerald Charles George Clifton, Superintendent, Gloucestershire Special Constabulary.
- Thomas George Cloke, Engine Room Storekeeper, SS Oriana, P. & O. Steam Navigation Co.
- Robert Raymond Cochran, Carpenter, Ministry of Public Building and Works.
- John Travers Cornwell, Process Senior Day Foreman (Oil Additives Plant), Lenning Chemicals Ltd.
- Alfred Cowell, Serjeant Major Instructor, West Lancashire Army Cadet Force.
- Norman Cowling, Chief Officer Class II, HM Prison, Aylesbury.
- Frederick Baden Cumbers, Mess Steward Grade I, School of Signals, Ministry of Defence (Army).
- Joseph Clifford Cunliffe, Training Officer, Calverton Colliery, No. 6 Area, East Midlands Division, National Coal Board.
- Bertram Stanley Daniels, Rod Mill Rollerman, Guest Keen & Nettlefolds (South Wales) Ltd.
- Francis John Dawson, Underground Roadway Repairer, Dollar Colliery, Fife/Alloa Area, Scottish Division, National Coal Board.
- William Edward Dawson, Chief Inspector, Electro Dynamic Construction Co. Ltd, Orpington.
- Walter Devine, Foreman Machinist, Vickers-Armstrong North East Works, Newcastle upon Tyne.
- Harry Dickinson, Assistant Manager (Electrical) Vickers Ltd, Shipbuilding Group, Vickers-Armstrong Barrow Shipyard.
- Edith Drury, Leading Tracer, Signals Research and Development Establishment, Ministry of Technology.
- Richard John Andrew Ducker, Chief Warehouseman, Publications Management, British Broadcasting Corporation.
- Peter Duncan, Transport Supervisor, United Kingdom Mission to the United Nations, Foreign Office.
- Edgar Edwards George Edgley, JP, Meter Reader, Eastern Electricity Board.
- Arthur Francis Evans, Production Co-ordinator, Marconi Company Ltd.
- Matthew Fell, Caretaker, Territorial Army Centre, Morecambe.
- Frederick Thomas Fenner, Instrument Maker/Mechanic, Standard Telecommunication Laboratories Ltd.
- Cyril Robert James Ferris, Workshop Supervisor, Grade III, Post Office Motor Transport Workshop, Portadown, Co. Armagh.
- Frank Flynn, Underground Worker, Hapton Valley Colliery, Burnley Area, North-Western Division, National Coal Board.
- James Joseph Gaffney, Foreman Meat Porter. For services to the meat trade.
- Sidney Daniel Gardiner, Chief Usher, Royal Courts of Justice, Lord Chancellor's Department.
- Kenneth Garner, Timber Foreman, Garston Docks, British Transport Docks Board.
- John George Gilbert, Boatswain, MV Baron Belhaven, H. Hogarth & Sons Ltd.
- George William Gilbey, Postal and Telegraph Officer, Head Post Office, Croydon.
- Frederick Glass, Caulker, Vickers Ltd. (Shipbuilding).
- Alfred Thomas Glew, Bulldozer Operator, Bomb Disposal Unit, Ministry of Defence (Army).
- Mary Elizabeth Annie Goddard, Sub-Postmistress, Blaisdon, Longhope.
- Richard Frederick Grainger, lately Technical Officer Grade II, Trinity House Workshops, Blackwall.
- Robert Gray, Quartermaster, Port New Plymouth, Port Line Ltd.
- George Greenhorn, Supervisory Foreman, Class 2, Sighthill, British Railways Board.
- Robert Patrick Guest, Warrant Officer, No. 611 (2nd Liverpool) Squadron, Air Training Corps.
- William Gunn, Chargehand Fitter, Dounreay Experimental Reactor Establishment, United Kingdom Atomic Energy Authority.
- Leonard Harding, lately Process and General Supervisory Grade III, Royal Armament Research and Development Establishment, Ministry of Defence (Army).
- Charles Farewell Harrison, lately Saw Assembler, Spear & Jackson Ltd.
- Ada Georgina Hart, Commandant, N/92 Detachment, Norfolk Branch, British Red Cross Society.
- Frank Hart, Member of Warden Section, Civil Defence Corps, Lancashire.
- Kenneth Waton Mann Hart, Chief Inspector, Head Post Office, Middlesbrough.
- Nancy Priscilla Hawksworth, Centre Organiser, Beaconsfield, Women's Royal Voluntary Service.
- Jane Ann Heaton, Honorary Collector, Street Savings Group, Blackpool.
- Henry John Helm, Chargehand Carriage and Wagon Examiner, Tyne Yard, British Railways Board.
- Edward Sydenham Hill, Foreman, Middlesex Region, Department of Public Health Engineering, Greater London Council.
- Trevor Hill, Chargehand Packer, Export Department, Revlon International Corporation.
- William Charles Hocking, Painter, Ministry of Public Building and Works.
- Daniel Hodgson, Calf Certifying Officer, Ministry of Agriculture, Fisheries and Food.
- Stephen Wentworth Holden, Gas Fitter, South Eastern Gas Board.
- Robert Lane Holyoake, Sub-Officer, Worcester City and County Fire Brigade.
- Winifred Honeyman, Assistant Chief Welfare Section Officer, Civil Defence Corps, North Riding of Yorkshire.
- Horace Frank Hunt, Shift Electrician, London Electricity Board.
- Eileen Elsie Maud Inge, Chief Supervisor, Advance Telephone Exchange, London.
- Mary James, County Clothing Organiser, East Sussex, Women's Royal Voluntary Service.
- Sarah Katurah James, Honorary Collector, Street Savings Group, Llanfyllin.
- Robert Taylor Jefferson, Assistant to Liaison Officer, Clarke, Chapman & Co. Ltd, Gateshead.
- Albert Johnston, Forester, Ministry of Agriculture for Northern Ireland.
- Margaret Mary Jones, Woman Inspector, Worcestershire Constabulary.
- Reginald David Jesse Jones, JP, Bus Driver, Crosville Motor Services Ltd, Transport Holding Company.
- Albert Edward Kelham, lately Driver, City Engineer's Department, County Borough of
- Elizabeth Anne Kersley, County Clothing Officer, Northumberland, Women's Royal Voluntary Service.
- Albert Abraham Khan, Donkeyman, SS Empress of Canada, Canadian Pacific Steamships Ltd.
- John Large, Watcher-Driver, Board of Customs and Excise.
- James Henry Lees, Head Porter, National Physical Laboratory, Ministry of Technology.
- James Lonsdale, Overman, Newmarket Silkstone Colliery, No. 8 (Castleford) Area, Yorkshire Division, National Coal Board.
- Robert Loveday, Chief Rescue Instructor, Civil Defence Corps, Northamptonshire.
- Frederick Walter Loveless, Attendant, Camberwell Reception Centre, Supplementary Benefits Commission, Ministry of Social Security.
- Ida Ludlow, Supervisor, Joseph Lucas (Sales & Service) Ltd.
- John Mcdonald, Assistant in Work Study Department, Selo Ltd, Brentwood.
- George Robert Mackay, Ganger, Forestry Commission, Scotland.
- William McNamara, Civil Engineering Craftsman, Road Research Laboratory, Ministry of Transport.
- Alexander Thompson McNeill, lately Head Fire Patrolman, Command Ordnance Depot, Kinnegar, Ministry of Defence (Army).
- William Alan McPherson, Senior Chargehand Linesman, Midlands Region, Central Electricity Generating Board.
- Beatrice Madden, Photoprinter Grade II, Home Office.
- John Storey Mallabar, Chief Inspector, Tynemouth Borough Police.
- Agnes Mann, Foster-mother, Stanmore, Middlesex.
- Margaret Jessie Mansfield, Chief Woman Observer, Assistant Duty Controller, No. 22 Group, Royal Observer Corps.
- Alfred Edward Manship, Foreman, Rolls-Royce Ltd, Derby.
- Harry Marchant, Toolroom Superintendent, Wellworthy Ltd, Salisbury.
- Rowland Milwyn Morris, Sub-Postmaster, Painscastle Sub-Post Office, Builth Wells, Breconshire.
- John Martin, Foreman, Alston Highway Division, Cumberland County Council.
- Norman Will Mason, Member of Headquarters Section, Civil Defence Corps, Birmingham.
- Victor Ernest Massen, Supervisor Instrument Maker, Independent Television Authority.
- Charles William Maton, Inspector, Metropolitan Police.
- Nora Mary Miller, Overseer, Market Gate Branch Post Office, Warrington.
- William Thomas Mitchell, Donkeyman/Greaser, MV Carnatic, General Service Contracts.
- Frederick Joseph Moss, Chargeman of Boats, Gibraltar, Ministry of Defence (Royal Navy).
- Charles Murray, Sergeant, Royal Ulster Constabulary.
- Walter Bashford Neale, Moulder, Hattersley Bros. Ltd, Mexborough.
- Margaret Winifred Nielsen, Centre Organiser, Bridlington, Women's Royal Voluntary Service.
- Hugh Thomas O'Connor, Wardrobe Master, British Broadcasting Corporation.
- Henry O'Leary, Regimental Sergeant-Major (School Staff Instructor) St. Edmund's School, Combined Cadet Force.
- Harry Turner Osborn, Chief Observer, No. 4 Group, Royal Observer Corps.
- Julia Maud Osborne, Duplicator Operator, Department of Economic Affairs.
- Sydney Alfred Page, Film Store Manager, Central Office of Information.
- Albert Walter Papworth, Police Constable, Euston Station, British Transport Police Force.
- John Patterson, Sub-District Commandant, Ulster Special Constabulary.
- George Herbert Pearson, Chief Inspector, Station Sorting Office, Post Office, Bristol.
- Francis Frederick Pembery, Overseer Grade IV, HM Stationery Office.
- Ernest George Perkins, Driver (Locomotives) Instructor, Bletchley, British Railways Board.
- Lilian Julia Perks, Honorary Collector, Street Savings Group, Walsall.
- Enoch Frederick Phillips, Foreman, The General Electric Co. Ltd, Portsmouth.
- Evelyn Mary Plummer, First Aid Instructor, Civil Defence Corps, Dorset.
- George Potter, Senior Groundsman, Newmarket Race Course.
- Harold John Price, Coxswain, Milford Haven Conservancy Board.
- John Frederick Price, Loading Supervisor II, British European Airways Corporation.
- William Prosser, Foreman, Rediffusion (Wales) Ltd, Pontypridd.
- Charles Henry Read, Store-Keeper, Bournemouth District, Southern Electricity Board.
- Gwyn Lewis Ritchings, Principal Foreman of Stores, No. 14 Maintenance Unit, Ministry of Defence (Air).
- Joseph Roach, Auxiliary Plant Attendant, North Western Region, Central Electricity Generating Board.
- Arthur Rogers, Member of Rescue Section, Civil Defence Corps, Cheshire.
- Angus Ross, Foreman, Inverness Muirtown Garage and Maintenance Depot, David MacBrayne Ltd.
- William T. Rushton, Instructor, Queen Elizabeth's Training College for the Disabled.
- Henry Saffhill, Colliery Deputy, Mid-Cannock Colliery, Cannock (No. 2) Area, West Midlands Division, National Coal Board.
- George Edward Shipperley, Supervising Warden I, Science Museum, Department of Education and Science.
- Francis Edwin Simpson, Maintenance Man, North Western Division, North Thames Gas Board.
- Edwin Smith, Foreman Fitter, Vickers Ltd.
- Henry Smith, Foreman Blacksmith, Samuel Fox & Co. Ltd, Sheffield.
- Reginald Percival Smith, Station Officer, Wiltshire Fire Brigade.
- Rose Smith, Honorary Collector, Street Savings Group, Belfast.
- William Henry Smith, Chief Officer, Warden Section, Civil Defence Corps, London Borough of Havering.
- William Victor Smith, Civilian Instructor, No. 1026 (Ormskirk) Squadron, Air Training Corps.
- Cyril Wells Spendelow, Commandant, Grimsby Special Constabulary.
- Joseph William Spurr, Foreman, Newton Bros. (Derby) Ltd.
- John William Steele, Senior Electrical Foreman, Shelton Iron & Steel Ltd.
- Arthur Edward Stimson, Technician Class I, Post Office Railway, Western District Office.
- Esther Stouph, Manageress of Unit Canteen, Chester-le-Street Sea Cadet Corps.
- Peter John Straiton, lately Range Warden, Foxbar Rifle Range.
- Ernest John Strand, Stores and Despatch Foreman, Wright Rain Ltd.
- John Sutherland, Foreman Dam Attendant, North of Scotland Hydro-Electric Board.
- Mary Myrtle Thomson, Divisional Welfare Officer (Leith), Edinburgh Branch, British Red Cross Society.
- Mona Eileen Timms, Senior Leading Firewoman, Auxiliary Fire Service, Warwickshire County Fire Brigade.
- George Maurice Tranter, Chief Model Maker, Whiteley Electrical Radio Co, Mansfield.
- William John Trigg, Colliery Overman, Garw Colliery, No. 2 (Maesteg) Area, South Western Division, National Coal Board.
- Joseph Tom Vernon, Chief First Aid Room Attendant, English Steel Corporation Ltd.
- Leonard Baker Wadhams, Fisherman, Medway Fishery, Kent.
- Winifred Hope Stewart Wallace, Hospital Car Service Organiser, Edinburgh Centre, Women's Royal Voluntary Service.
- Margaret Wardle, Head of Design Department, Mary Harris Ltd.
- Janet Smith Watson, Honorary Savings Group Collector, Glasgow.
- Elsie Webb, Leading Machinist, G.Q. Parachute Company Ltd.
- Alfred Ewen Wegg, Holder Site Maintenance Man, Southern Gas Board.
- George William West, Building Foreman, Whittington Hospital, London.
- Sarah Jane West, Housekeeper, British Transport Staff College, Woking.
- Harry Wheeler, Chargehand Storeman, Aldermaston, United Kingdom Atomic Energy Authority.
- Gladys Lilian Theodora White, Honorary Collector, Street Savings Group, Pembury, Kent.
- Ernest Whitehead, Leading Fireman, British Transport Docks Board.
- John William Nicholson Wilkins, Quartermaster, SS Pendennis Castle, British & Commonwealth Shipping Co. Ltd.
- Robert Adam Wilson, Assistant Divisional Officer, Newcastle and Gateshead Fire Service.
- Donald Wiseman, Ship's Plater, Cammell Laird & Co. (Shipbuilders & Engineers) Ltd, Birkenhead.
- John Henry Woodhouse, Distribution Foreman, Matlock Sub-Division, East Midlands Gas Board.

State of New South Wales

- Sophia Blewett. For welfare services to the community of Auburn.
- Wesley Austin Burgess. For services to the community of Mayfield.
- Dugald Alexander McLaughlan, lately Overseer, Letterpress Section, Printing Office.
- Elsie Doris Munro. For welfare services to the community of Pennant Hills.
- James Henry Pearce, Engineering Assistant, Mechanical Laboratories, Department of Railways.
- Daisy Florence Turner. For services to the community particularly in Kempsey.

State of Victoria

- Marjorie Ann Lineham. For services to the Corps of Commissionaires.

State of Queensland

- Stanley Arthur James Gallier, Stores Assistant, State Government Insurance Office.

State of Western Australia

- Senior Major Elsie O'Neil. For welfare services with the Salvation Army in the City of Perth.
- Albert Dudley Vaughan. For services in the interests and for the development of aboriginal people.

Overseas Territories

- Simon Lucas, Police Photographer and Criminal Record Officer, British Honduras Police Force.
- Dolorita Juanita Hendricks, District Nurse, Jost Van Dyke, British Virgin Islands.
- Zacchaeus Mills, Chairman, Brick Kiln Village Board, Nevis, Saint Christopher Nevis Anguilla.
- Therese Netheline Cheddie, District Post-mistress, Micoud, St. Lucia.
- Ruby Winifred Neverson, Departmental Sister, Colonial Hospital, St. Vincent.
- France Carolus, lately Senior Mental Attendant, Seychelles.
- Dorothy Kathleen Ah-Thew, lately Head Teacher, Praslin Primary School, Seychelles.
- Te Teba Rimon, Magistrate of Nikunau, Gilbert and Ellice Islands, Western Pacific.
- Fitilau Puapua, Magistrate of Vaitupu, Gilbert and Ellice Islands, Western Pacific.
- James Dhlamini, Hospital Dispenser, Mbabane Hospital, Swaziland.
- Thomas Dlamini, Artisan, Roads Branch, Public Works Department, Swaziland.

=== Royal Red Cross (RRC) ===
- Lieutenant-Colonel Elizabeth Orr Bassett (221511), Queen Alexandra's Royal Army Nursing Corps.

==== Associate of the Royal Red Cross (ARRC) ====
- Sheila Rosemary Phyllis Barton, Superintending Sister, Queen Alexandra's Royal Naval Nursing Service.
- Pamela Marjorie Perrin, Superintending Sister, Queen Alexandra's Royal Naval Nursing Service.
- Captain Diana Geraldine Mary Anderson (459562), Queen Alexandra's Royal Army Nursing Corps.
- Major Norah Letch (417806), Queen Alexandra's Royal Army Nursing Corps.
- Major Agnes Annie Williams (274073), Queen Alexandra's Royal Army Nursing Corps.
- Squadron Officer Sylvia Mary Baker (407374), Princess Mary's Royal Air Force Nursing Service.
- Squadron Officer Eva McCulley (406743), Princess Mary's Royal Air Force Nursing Service.

=== Air Force Cross (AFC) ===
Army

- Captain John Angus Coles (418231), Army Air Corps.

Royal Air Force

- Wing Commander Donald Aston Arnott, DFC, (607080).
- Wing Commander Geoffrey Reginald Kent Fletcher (3039050).
- Wing Commander Irving Scott (164626).
- Squadron Leader Robert Dennis Alexander (1333627).
- Squadron Leader Richard David Bates (607457).
- Squadron Leader Maynard Maxwell Dalston (3110249).
- Squadron Leader Michael Charles Ginn (607625).
- Flight Lieutenant Anthony John Couchman (151462).
- Flight Lieutenant John Leonard Davis (3504688).
- Flight Lieutenant Anthony John Redfern Doyle (3514843).
- Flight Lieutenant Charles Edward Slater, DFC, (1305635).
- Flight Lieutenant Jack Leslie Walker (172947).
- Flying Officer Robert Clive Henderson (507142).

=== Air Force Medal (AFM) ===
- C0587996 Flight Sergeant Michael Frederick Thatcher, Royal Air Force.

=== Queen's Commendation for Valuable Service in the Air ===
Royal Air Force

- Wing Commander Deryk Arthur Maddox (180382).
- Squadron Leader Michael Keith Adams (4111758).
- Squadron Leader David Thomas McCann (2533339).
- Squadron Leader Keith William Payne (4050749).
- Acting Squadron Leader Michael James Graydon (607932).
- Flight Lieutenant Kenneth Arthur Ball (503735). For services while on loan to the Kenya Air Force.
- Flight Lieutenant William Arthur Barrell, AFC, AFM, (4035673).
- Flight Lieutenant Ronald Arthur Edward Dunn (3509785).
- Flight Lieutenant Alan Charles East (4084134).
- Flight Lieutenant Peter Aylmer Wetherill Forrester (1683353).
- Flight Lieutenant Kenneth Stuart Gibson (4033972).
- Flight Lieutenant John Denis Edward Henly (4048072).
- Flight Lieutenant Brian Alan I'Anson (3127453).
- Flight Lieutenant Ronald Miles (4010414).
- Flight Lieutenant Frantisek Mlejnecky (160980).
- Flight Lieutenant Godfrey Earl Norton (4112522).
- Flight Lieutenant Antony Robin Powell Phipps (607976).
- Flight Lieutenant Eric Jarram Randell (4179510).
- Flight Lieutenant William Richard Shrubsole (1804440).
- Flight Lieutenant John Harold Simpson, DFC, (157676).
- Flight Lieutenant Robert Michael Turner (4230307).
- Flight Lieutenant Dennis Clifford Wanklyn (578568).
- Flight Lieutenant Patrick Tindall Whitelaw (4030696).
- Flight Lieutenant Donald Frederick Wimble (1864239).
- Flying Officer John Alfred Tulip (4102006).
- Master Signaller Jaroslav Schellong, AFM, (R0788144).
- Master Engineer Donald Chatten (S0808319).
- W0586818 Flight Sergeant Oliver Gordon Strathairn.

United Kingdom

- Kenneth Bailey, Principal Engineer, Ministry of Technology, Air Station, Pershore.
- Sidney Louis Bolton, Flight Engineering Superintendent, V.C.10 Flight, British Overseas Airways Corporation.
- William Henry Else, Test Pilot, Hawker Siddeley Aviation Ltd, Stockport, Cheshire.
- John Samuel Fay, Test Pilot and Chief Helicopter Instructor, Westland Aircraft Ltd, Yeovil, Somerset.
- George Alfred Gordon Merriman, Experimental Officer, Royal Radar Establishment, Ministry of Technology.

=== Queen's Police Medal (QPM) ===
England and Wales

- Joseph Thomas Manuel, Her Majesty's Inspector of Constabulary.
- George Robert Glendinning, OBE, Chief Constable, Wiltshire Constabulary.
- George Walter Roberts Terry, Chief Constable, East Sussex Constabulary.
- Harold Edmund Legg, Assistant Chief Constable, Liverpool and Bootle Constabulary.
- George Hugh Whitton Wilkinson, Assistant Chief Constable, Buckinghamshire Constabulary.
- Harry Ashworth Kitching, Assistant Chief Constable, Bradford City Police.
- William Edward Lyscom, Chief Superintendent, Metropolitan Police. Deputy Director, Senior Staff Course, The Police College.
- Percy George Wilkes, Chief Superintendent, Cheshire Constabulary.
- Norman Radford, Commander, Metropolitan Police.
- Cyril Davies, lately Superintendent, Metropolitan Police.
- William Robertson Cramb, Superintendent, Metropolitan Police.
- Reginald James Webb, Constable, Metropolitan Police. Chairman, Joint Central Committee, Police Federation of England and Wales.

Scotland

- Robert McAlpine McPherson Campbell, Assistant Chief Constable, Edinburgh City Police.
- Robert Brown Gordon, Chief Constable, Hamilton Burgh Police.

Northern Ireland

- Robert Kennedy Little, Head Constable, Royal Ulster Constabulary.

State of New South Wales

- Raymond George Blissett, Detective Superintendent, 2nd Class, New South Wales Police Force.
- Donald James Watts, Superintendent, 3rd Class, New South Wales Police Force.
- Robert Valentine Holt, Superintendent, 3rd Class, New South Wales Police Force.
- Victor Raymond Woodward, Superintendent, 3rd Class, New South Wales Police Force.
- John Lindsay, Superintendent, 3rd Class, New South Wales Police Force.
- Randall Harland Whiteman, Detective Inspector, 1st Glass, New South Wales Police Force.

State of South Australia

- Alfred Kenneth Laslett, Inspector, South Australia Police Force.
- Sidney Noel Smith, Inspector, South Australia Police Force.

Nigeria

- Michael Charles Hugh Guyler, Deputy Commissioner, Nigeria Police.

Overseas Territories

- Thomas Arthur Handford, MVO, Deputy Commissioner of Police, Fiji Police Force.
- Charles Payne Sutcliffe, MBE, Assistant Commissioner of Police, Hong Kong Police Force.
- Fong Yik-fai, Senior Superintendent, Hong Kong Police Force.
- Louis Ulric Maxime Ah-Yave, Assistant Commissioner of Police, Seychelles Police Force.

=== Queen's Fire Services Medal (QFSM) ===
England and Wales

- Aubrey Leonard Bullion, Chief Fire Officer, Somerset Fire Brigade.
- William Arthur Saunders, Divisional Officer, Grade I, London Fire Brigade.
- Albert Edward Thornhill, Assistant Chief Officer (Deputy Chief Officer), Nottinghamshire Fire Brigade.
- Desmond Ronald Squire, Divisional Officer, Grade I, London Fire Brigade.

Scotland

- Samuel Harris Park, Firemaster, Central Area Fire Brigade.

=== Colonial Police Medal (CPM) ===
Brunei

- Chua Kong Leng, Assistant Superintendent, Royal Brunei Police Force.

Swaziland

- Leslie James Bardwell, Superintendent, Swaziland Police Force.
- Hugo Stanley Hurly, Superintendent, (Acting Assistant Commissioner), Swaziland Police Force.
- John William Lay, OBE, Senior Superintendent, Swaziland Police Force.

Overseas Territories

- Octave Gaston Avice, Superintendent, Mauritius Police Force.
- Randolph Beckles, Inspector (Bandmaster), Royal Saint Lucia Police Force.
- Thomas William Carr, Senior Superintendent, Hong Kong Auxiliary Police Force.
- Chan Cheung-chuen, Superintendent, Hong Kong Police Force.
- Cheng Chau, Corporal, Hong Kong Police Force.
- George Reginald Dunning, Superintendent, Hong Kong Police Force.
- Fung Pak-wing, Fireman Class II, Fire Services, Hong Kong.
- Hui Kwan-hung, Staff Sergeant Class II, Hong Kong Police Force.
- Lam Chuen, Principal Fireman (Marine), Fire Services, Hong Kong.
- Freddy Lorens, Police Bandmaster, Mauritius Police Force.
- John Duncan Muir, Assistant Superintendent, Seychelles Police Force.
- Ng Hon-kwan, Inspector, Hong Kong Police Force.
- Michael Alltimes Ringer, Superintendent, Hong Kong Police Force.
- Joseph Louis Rodriguez, Station Sergeant Gibraltar Police Force.
- Abdool Azize Sookia, Superintendent, Mauritius Police Force.
- Tam Wah, Fireman Class I, Fire Services, Hong Kong.
- Tsang Wing, Staff Sergeant Class II, Hong Kong Police Force.
- John Cleveland Wiser, Assistant Superintendent, Hong Kong Auxiliary Police Force.

== Australia ==
=== Knight Bachelor ===
- Donald George Anderson, CBE. Director General, Department of Civil Aviation.
- Norman Lethbridge Cowper, CBE, of Wahroonga, New South Wales. For distinguished public services.
- Laurence John Hartnett, CBE, of Mount Eliza, Victoria. For distinguished service to Industry and Government.
- Cedric Oban Turner, CBE, of Turramurra, New South Wales. For distinguished services to aviation.
- William Gaston Walkley, CBE, of Balgowlah, New South Wales. For distinguished service to Australian Industry.
- Captain John Protheroe Williams, CMG, OBE, Chairman, Australian Coastal Shipping Commission.

=== Order of the Bath ===
==== Companion of the Order of the Bath (CB) ====
Military Division

- Air Vice-Marshal Ernest Hey, CBE, Royal Australian Air Force.

=== Order of Saint Michael and Saint George ===
==== Companion of the Order of St Michael and St George (CMG) ====
- Robert Richmond Campbell, OBE, of Athelstone, South Australia. Director, National Gallery of South Australia. For services to Art.
- The Honourable Mr Justice Percy Ernest Joske, Judge, Commonwealth Industrial Court, and Supreme Court, Australian Capital Territory. For services to Parliament, Law and Life Saving.
- The Honourable Allan Victor Maxwell. Former Judge of the Supreme Court of New South Wales. For long and valuable public service, in particular for the blind.

=== Order of the British Empire ===
==== Dame Commander of the Order of the British Empire (DBE) ====
Civil Division

- Senator Ivy Evelyn Wedgwood, of Kew, Victoria. For distinguished services to Parliament and the community.

==== Knight Commander of the Order of the British Empire (KBE) ====
Military Division

- Lieutenant-General Thomas Joseph Daly, CB, CBE, DSO, (45), Chief of the General Staff.

==== Commander of the Order of the British Empire (CBE) ====
Military Division

- Rear Admiral William David Hamilton Graham, CBE.
- Major-General John Raymond Broadbent, DSO, ED, (261506), General List, Australian Army.
- Air Commodore William Darcy Mason, OBE, Royal Australian Air Force.

Civil Division

- George Bell, OBE, MB, FRCS, Honorary Consultant Surgeon, Sydney Hospital. For services to medicine.
- Gladys Penfold Hyland, of Elizabeth Bay, New South Wales. For services to the community and for charity.
- Peter Henry Karmel, Principal, Flinders University, Adelaide.
- Richard Kingsland, DFC, Secretary, Department of the Interior.
- George Douglas Bennett Maunder, OBE, of Boxhill, Victoria. Director-General, Department of Works.
- Reginald Charles Reed, of Killara, New South Wales. For public services to the shipping industry.
- Harold Edward Renfree, OBE, Commonwealth Crown Solicitor.
- Lionel Alexander Simpson, OBE, of Sandy Bay, Tasmania. For long and valuable public service.
- Ernest Keith White, OBE, MC, of Neutral Bay, New South Wales. Co-founder and Vice-President, Australian-American Association.

==== Officer of the Order of the British Empire (OBE) ====
Military Division

Royal Australian Navy

- Electrical Commander Alexander Francis Heggie.

Australian Military Forces

- Lieutenant-Colonel Graham Stuart Allen (237616), Royal Corps of Australian Electrical and Mechanical Engineers.
- Colonel Alexander John Maum Sinclair, ED, (35009), Royal Australian Army Medical Corps.
- Colonel Thomas William Young (272), Australian Staff Corps.

Royal Australian Air Force

- Group Captain Donald Robert McKendry.
- Wing Commander Lyndon Spencer Compton (033107).

Civil Division

- William Charles Andrews, Associate Commissioner, National Capital Development Commission.
- Frederick Robert Berry, of Mount Lawley, Western Australia. Chairman of the Commonwealth Council of the British and Foreign Bible Society in Australia.
- Neville Manning Blyton, of Kew, Victoria. For services to commerce and export.
- Rabbi Rudolph Brasch, Chief Minister of Temple Emanuel, Woollahra.
- Frederick William Arthur Clements, MD, BS, of Lindfield, New South Wales. For services to medicine.
- The Right Reverend George Michael Crennan, of Elizabeth Bay, New South Wales. National Director of the Federal Catholic Immigration Committee.
- Owen Lennox Davis, Assistant Secretary and Chairman of the Joint Intelligence Committee, Department of External Affairs.
- William Purves Godfrey, MBE, TD, of Toorak, Victoria. For services to Architecture.
- John Robert Gordon, of Mildura, Victoria. Deputy Chairman, Australian Dried Fruits Control Board.
- Alan Harris, First Assistant Secretary (Budget and Accounting), Department of the Treasury.
- Frank Cotter Henderson, Assistant Administrator (Economic Affairs), Territory of Papua and New Guinea.
- Ross Ainsworth Hohnen, Registrar, Australian National University, Canberra.
- Selwyn Victor Jones, of Point Piper, New South Wales. For services to the Shipping Industry.
- Hugh Alan Leslie, President, British Commonwealth Paraplegic Games Council.
- Robert Limb, of Killara, New South Wales. For services to entertainment, to the community, and to servicemen.
- Frederick Lockwood McCay, First Assistant Secretary (Policy), Department of National Development.
- Frank Ernest Mansell, of Burwood, New South Wales. Executive Director, Big Brother Movement. For services in the migration of British youth to Australia.
- The Right Reverend Seering John Matthews, Bishop of Carpentaria.
- The Reverend Frank Robinson, President, Baptist Union of New South Wales.
- Norman Alfred Studt, of Mareeba, Queensland. Chairman, Tobacco Grower's Council (Australia). For services to the tobacco industry.
- James Richard Vickery, of Strathfield, New South Wales. Director, Commonwealth Scientific and Industrial Research Organisation.
- Albert James Watt, of South Yarra, Victoria. For public services rendered over many years.
- William John Weeden, Senior Assistant Secretary, Department of Education and Science.

==== Member of the Order of the British Empire (MBE) ====
Military Division

Royal Australian Navy

- Lieutenant Commander (SP) Frank Geoffrey Evans, RANVR.

Australian Military Forces

- 22389 Warrant Officer Class I Arthur Donald Johnston, EM, Royal Australian Infantry Corps.
- 21150 Warrant Officer Class II Keith May, Royal Australian Infantry Corps.
- Major Donald Douglas Patterson (2264), Australian Staff Corps.
- 1221 Warrant Officer Class I (temporary) Gabriel Phillippe Sayeg, Royal Australian Army Provost Staff Corps.
- Major David Ewart Benjamin Prosser, ED, (532520), Royal Australian Army Ordnance Corps.
- Major Alistair McCullum Scobie, ED, (2151946), Royal Australian Artillery.
- Major (provisional) Terence Royd Sullivan (57042), Royal Australian Infantry Corps.

Royal Australian Air Force

- Squadron Leader Quinten John Foster (03555).
- Flight Lieutenant Clifford Henry Trethewey (06564).
- Warrant Officer William Alexander Allan (A2485).
- Warrant Officer Jeffrey Constable (A2582).

Civil Division

- Alfred Cornelius Bradford, of Deniliquin, New South Wales. President of the Conargo Shire Council.
- Ewan Stewart Cameron, of Narrandera, New South Wales. For services to ex-servicemen.
- Margaret Kathleen Cameron, of Greenslopes, Queensland. For work in fostering Australian/Asian relations.
- Frederick Boyd Davidson, Assistant Inspector, Commonwealth Public Service Board.
- Clement George Davison, of Broken Hill, New South Wales. For services to the community.
- Michael Venantius Stanislaus Duffy, of Narromine, New South Wales. For services to the community.
- Edith Edwards, of Cronulla, New South Wales. For services to the community.
- Thomas William Ellis, DFC. District Commissioner, Western Highlands District, Papua and New Guinea.
- June Ferguson, of Epping, New South Wales. For services to women's athletics.
- Ronald Douglas Finlayson, of Burwood, Victoria. Controller (Drafting Services), Engineering Works Division, Postmaster-General's Department.
- Thomas Fitzgerald, of Hamilton, New South Wales. For services to ex-servicemen.
- Harold Melville Fitzpatrick, Engineer Class 4, Engineering and Works Division, Postmaster-General's Department.
- Samuel Charles Fitzpatrick, MC, MB, FRACS, of Hamilton, Victoria. For long and dedicated service to medicine and to the community.
- Victor Norman Gailey, of South Brisbane. For services to amateur cycling.
- Luigi Gigliotti, of Kyabram, Victoria. For services to migrants.
- Carl Ernest Nitchelmore Gunther, MD, BS. Medical Superintendent, Lady Davidson Hospital, Turramurra. For medical services to rehabilitees.
- Gwenyth Valmai Harrison (Miss Gwen Meredith), of Seaforth, New South Wales. Playwright. For services to radio entertainment,
- William Palmer Iggulden, of Beaumaris, Victoria. For services to gliding.
- Alexander James Lavercombe, Assistant Director, Administration and Finance, Department of Health, Brisbane.
- William Ernest Lawrence, Accountant, Revenue and Business Undertakings, Department of the Interior.
- Laurence Frederick McGinty, Mayor of Willoughby.
- Samuel Macleay, of Maroubra, New South Wales. For services to the community.
- Alan Dewar Malcolm, of Leeton, New South Wales. For services to ex-servicemen.
- Lawrence Harry Mangleson, Area Secretary, East Australian Area, Department of the Navy.
- Albert Hay Matheson, of Bexley, New South Wales. For services to the community.
- Allen Arthur Mole, Trials Preparation Officer, Weapons Research Establishment, Department of Supply, Woomera.
- Brooke Moore, MB, FRCS, of Bathurst, New South Wales. For long and valuable services to the community.
- Charles Thomas Murphy, Chief Auditor, Commonwealth Audit Office, Perth, Western Australia.
- Ian David Murray, of Djakarta, Indonesia. For services in furthering international relationships.
- Francis Xavier Newman, of Hobart, Tasmania. For services to incapacitated ex-servicemen and their dependants.
- Carl Andrew Freeman Nielson, President, Bundaberg Branch, Good Neighbour Council.
- Walter Rigby, of East Brighton, Victoria. First Assistant Commissioner (Appeals), Repatriation Department.
- George Albert James Robbins, Chief Fire Officer for the Northern Territory.
- Thomas Keith Shakespeare, of Manly, New South Wales. For services to Bowls and to the community.
- Horace Sydney Sharp, of Manyuna Beach, New South Wales. For services to ex-servicemen.
- John Alan Sherriff, Chairman, Townsville Regional Electricity Board.
- Graham Ferrers Shirley, of North Narrabeen, New South Wales. For services to the Australian livestock industry.
- Leslie James Squires, JP, of Yagoona, New South Wales. For services to ex-servicemen.
- Arthur Stovold, of Canterbury, Victoria. For services in the field of insurance.
- Douglas Thomson, President of the Shire of Eurobodalla.
- Rowland Eric Ernest Todd, Director of Naval Works, Department of the Navy, Canberra.
- John Grandison Watson, of Breadalbane, New South Wales. For services in the field of pastoral development and animal husbandry.
- Elva Annie Will, of South Yarra, Victoria. Clerk, Aged Persons Homes Branch, Department of Social Services.

=== Companion of the Imperial Service Order (ISO) ===
- Kenneth Davison, Formerly Deputy Commonwealth Statistician and Government Statistician in New South Wales.
- Edward John William Herbert, Controller-General (Production), Department of Supply.

=== British Empire Medal (BEM) ===
Military Division
Royal Australian Navy

- Ordnance Artificer (1st Class) (Weapons) Robin Beaumont Beaman, R.55970. (On loan to the Royal Malaysian Navy.)
- Master-at-Arms Frank Edwards, R.20218.
- Chief Petty Officer Cook Leslie William Mason, R.27600.
- Chief Engineering Mechanic Albert John Skinner, R.41286.

Australian Military Forces

- 13543 Sergeant Kenneth Henry Borgges, Royal Regiment of Australian Artillery.
- 3913 Corporal Eric Hovell Curphey, Royal Australian Army Provost Corps.
- 25857 Sergeant Douglas Haig Fyfe, Royal Australian Army Ordnance Corps.
- 261771 Staff Sergeant Victor Lawrence Heffernan, Royal Australian Infantry Corps.
- 34039 Staff Sergeant Edwin Bruce Hoare, Royal Australian Infantry Corps.
- 14299 Sergeant Bruce David Arthur Roach, Royal Australian Corps of Signals.

Royal Australian Air Force

- A23572 Flight Sergeant Alan Jeavons.
- A1639 Flight Sergeant Keith Clinton Sullivan.
- A51061 Sergeant Arthur Harold Jones.

Civil Division

- Vera Lillian Abell, Marsden Park, New South Wales. For services to the British and Foreign Bible Society.
- Stanley George Blythe, Technical Officer Grade I, Engineering Works Division, Postmaster-General's Department.
- John Raymond Carroll, Line Inspector, Engineering Division, Postmaster-General's Department.
- Maxwell Wisdom Leslie Case, Plant Inspector, Department of Works.
- Dorothy Fairless. For community service in Newcastle, New South Wales.
- Florence May Ferguson. Senior Social Worker Grade I, Citizenship Branch, Department of Immigration. For public service.
- Patrick Joseph Francis Gibson, Supervisor of Postmen, Postal Services Division, Postmaster-General's Department. For public service.
- John Falchney Hogg, Groupmaster, Dockyard Services Group, Department of the Navy. For public service.
- Emily Adelaide Hutt. For community service in Concord West, New South Wales.
- Rose Martha Lawrence, Accounting Machinist-in-Charge, Accounts Branch, Postmaster-General's Department. For public service.
- Edith Ada Elizabeth Leary, Postmistress, Greenfield Farm Exchange. For public service.
- Edward Leigh Manns, Assistant Welfare Officer, Personnel Branch, Postmaster-General's Department.
- Albert McKendry Mason. For services to ex-servicemen in Cammaray, New South Wales.
- Colin Alfred Mickleborough, Senior Technical Instructor Grade 2, Engineering and Works Branch, Postmaster-General's Department. For public service.
- Essie Olinther Mortimer. For community service in Gosford, New South Wales.
- Rosa Lilian Nicholson, Strathfield, New South Wales. For services to handicapped and retarded children.
- John Gordon Pinkerton, Superintending Foreman of Stores, Department of the Navy. For public service.
- Nasare Rabi, Linesman, Papua and New Guinea Electricity Commission, Rabaul.
- Constance Mary Richardson. For services to the aged in Wallsend, New South Wales.
- Ernest Edward Rose, Supervision Technician Grade 2, Engineering Division, Postmaster-General's Department. For public service.
- Evelyn Margery Simpson, Secretary, Cobram Fine Arts Society. For community services.
- Ivy Jessie Smith, Temporary Employment Officer, Commonwealth Public Service Board. For public service.
- Trevor Raymond Warren, Eastwood, South Australia. For services to the War Blinded Welfare Fund.

=== Queen's Police Medal (QPM) ===
- Jack Mervyn Davis, of Canberra, Deputy Commissioner, Commonwealth of Australia Police Force.
- Raymond Wells Whitrod, CVO, of Canberra, Commissioner, Commonwealth of Australia Police Force.

=== Air Force Cross (AFC) ===
Royal Australian Air Force

- Squadron Leader Ronald George Green (033664).
- Squadron Leader Roy Walter Hibben (037568).
- Squadron Leader Michael Kevin Lyons (035025).
- Flight Lieutenant Robert James Walsh (053889).

=== Queen's Commendation for Valuable Service in the Air ===
Royal Australian Air Force

- Squadron Leader Edward Arundel Radford (0216044).
- Flight Lieutenant Desmond Howard Francis Gibbs (053758).
- Flight Lieutenant Terence James Meagher (035033).
- Flight Lieutenant Ivan Stanley Skipworth (051911).
- A14394 Flight Sergeant Allan Wyndham Conway.

== Sierra Leone ==
=== Order of Saint Michael and Saint George ===
==== Companion of the Order of St Michael and St George (CMG) ====
- Sahr Thomas Matturi, Pro Vice-Chancellor, University of Sierra Leone, and Chairman, National Advisory Council.

=== Order of the British Empire ===
==== Commander of the Order of the British Empire (CBE) ====
Civil Division

- Roy Alexander Price, MBE, General Manager, Forest Industries Corporation, Kenema, Eastern Province.

==== Officer of the Order of the British Empire (OBE) ====
Civil Division

- Peter Marcel Bruce Bartlett. For services to Sierra Leone, in the fields of industrial development, and production of leaf tobacco.
- Thomas Alexander Leighton Decker, Permanent Secretary, Ministry of Information and Broadcasting.
- Ross Alexander Irvine Nicolson, Deputy Commissioner of Police.

==== Member of the Order of the British Empire (MBE) ====
Military Division

- Warrant Officer Class I Tamba Buedu, BEM, First Royal Sierra Leone Regiment.

Civil Division

- Paramount Chief Alhaji Samura Manga Fasineh II, Sulima Chiefdom, Koinadugu District, Northern Province.

=== British Empire Medal (BEM) ===
Civil Division

- Esekiel Alfred Coker, Deputy Superintendent of Police.

=== Queen's Police Medal (QPM) ===
- Alpha Mahmoud Kamara, Assistant Commissioner, Sierra Leone Police Force.
- Jenkins Nicholas Edmund George Smith, MVO, Assistant Commissioner, Sierra Leone Police Force.

== Jamaica ==
=== Knight Bachelor ===
- His Excellency Mr. Henry Laurence Lindo, CMG, High Commissioner for Jamaica in London.

=== Order of the British Empire ===
==== Commander of the Order of the British Empire (CBE) ====
Civil Division

- Gerald Arthur Lothian Mair, Deputy President of the Senate.

==== Officer of the Order of the British Empire (OBE) ====
Military Division

- Lieutenant-Colonel Dunstan Fitzgerald Robinson, MBE, ED, Jamaica Regiment.

==== Member of the Order of the British Empire (MBE) ====
Military Division

- Major Norman Flaxman Burrell, Jamaica Regiment (National Reserve).

Civil Division

- Oliver St. Pierre Marshall, For public services, particularly among ex-Servicemen.
- Victor Egburn Cox, Director of Construction, Public Works Department, Ministry of Communications and Works.
- Ena Joyce St. Clare Collymore-Woodstock. For public services, particularly with the Girl Guides Association.

=== Companion of the Imperial Service Order (ISO) ===
- James McDougal Sudu, Lately Registrar General.

=== British Empire Medal (BEM) ===
Military Division

- Sergeant Clifford Richard Hill, Jamaica Defence Force.
- Warrant Officer Class II Sydney Albert Reid, Jamaica Defence Force.

== Trinidad and Tobago ==
=== Queen's Police Medal (QPM) ===
- Francis Eustace Bernard, Deputy Commissioner of Police, Trinidad and Tobago.
- Cyril Woodford Peter Barnes, Assistant Commissioner of Police, Trinidad and Tobago.

== Gambia ==
=== Order of Saint Michael and Saint George ===
==== Companion of the Order of St Michael and St George (CMG) ====
- Philip Rodney Bridges, QC, Attorney General.

=== Order of the British Empire ===
==== Officer of the Order of the British Empire (OBE) ====
Civil Division

- Alhaji Abdoulie Jane Senghore, JP, Director of Posts and Communications.
- John Patrick Bray, Commissioner of Police.

==== Member of the Order of the British Empire (MBE) ====
Civil Division

- Sainey Seku Dabo, Senior Agricultural Superintendent, Agricultural Department.

=== British Empire Medal (BEM) ===
Civil Division

- Alkali Kinti, Senior Agricultural Assistant.
- William Adolphus Daniel, Chief Dispenser.

== Guyana ==
=== Knight Bachelor ===
- Harry Annamunthodo, MB, FRCS, Professor of Surgery, University of West Indies.

=== Order of the British Empire ===
==== Officer of the Order of the British Empire (OBE) ====
Civil Division

- Alfred Randolph Yhap, Member of Public Service Commission.

==== Member of the Order of the British Empire (MBE) ====
Civil Division

- Enid Eileen Abrahams. For services to education.

== Barbados ==
=== Order of the British Empire ===
==== Commander of the Order of the British Empire (CBE) ====
Civil Division

- Thomas Noel Peirce, President, West Indies Cricket Board of Control. For services to sport particularly cricket.

==== Officer of the Order of the British Empire (OBE) ====
Civil Division

- Wesley Herbert Colin Weekes, Comptroller of Customs.

==== Member of the Order of the British Empire (MBE) ====
Civil Division

- Owen St. Clair Smith, Chief Public Assistance Officer.
- Eleanor Nurse, Deputy Headmistress, Queen's College. For services to education.
