= Savage Civilisation =

1937 book by Tom Harrisson

- Title page for Savage Civilisation (1937)
- Author: Tom Harrisson
- Publisher: Victor Gollancz
- Publication date: 1937

Savage Civilisation is a 1937 book by Tom Harrisson. It was published in January 1937 by Victor Gollancz. The book is a mixture of history, ethnographical account and travel narrative, set in the New Hebrides (now Vanuatu). Harrisson’s biographer, Judith Heimann, describes it as one of the “few works of scholarship in the social sciences to have survived so well the sixty-odd years” since its publication.

== Origins ==
In September 1933 the Oxford University Expedition to the New Hebrides (then an Anglo-French Condominium) arrived at Hog Harbour, Espiritu Santo Island. The expedition aimed to collect and observe the flora and fauna of the islands under the leadership of the Oxford biologist John Baker. Harrisson was enrolled as an ornithologist. A photographer, zoologist and botanist also numbered among the expedition’s members. The following year the team was enlarged to include the Australian Jock Marshall. Marshall was to stay after the rest of the expedition returned to England and Harrisson volunteered to help him. He ended up staying until the middle of 1935.

Harrisson conceived the book as a monument to the local people whom he initially believed were doomed to extinction. To this end he began to collect census data and, later still, ethnographic information about the various communities on the islands. His project took him to Malekula in mid-1934, the territory of the Big Nambas, a community that was not enamoured with Western ways and which was said to still practice cannibalism. Few whites had spent much time among these people. Harrisson put down his own success at doing so to his unusual ability to consume vast amounts of the local liquid intoxicant, kava.

By mid-November 1934, Harrisson had enough material for his planned book and he was ready to depart. Unfortunately, he didn’t have the money for a ticket home. This problem was solved by his appointment as acting British agent to Malekula at the end of the year. While holding this official position Harrisson made the acquaintance of Douglas Fairbanks Senior. Fairbanks was sailing around the world and, after sending some time with Harrisson, decided that a film about the Big Nambas would be popular back home. Harrisson agreed to help and, in that way, got himself a free passage to Tahiti. He arrived there in July 1935. Towards the end of the year he left Tahiti by commercial steamer, arriving in the United Kingdom in late December 1935.

Once back home he immediately set to work on the book. He had good fortune in being able to gain access to the notes of John Layard who, over the course of 1914 and 1915, had lived and worked in the New Hebrides as an anthropologist. Heimann tells us that this access was in effect a trade as Harrisson had information about certain Malekula dances and bird auguries that Layard needed to finish his own book, Stone Men of Malekula (116-117).

His arrival back in the United Kingdom also attracted the attention of the Royal Geographical Society which arranged for him to give a talk in March 1936. It was a success and the Society agreed to publish the lecture. Harrisson also wrote articles for the Geographical Journal and produced another lecture for the BBC.

At the end of March, Gollancz awarded him a £150 advance. He finished writing in July 1936. The book was published in the United Kingdom in 1937 and was made a selection of Gollancz’s Left Book Club. The same year saw publication in the United States by Alfred A. Knopf.

== Content ==
The book is divided into two major parts. In the first, Harrisson discusses the history and culture of New Hebrides. In the second, the focus is on his own direct experiences, mostly after the Oxford Expedition had left the islands.

Harrisson begins the book with him standing at the top of Mount Tabwemasana on Espiritu Santo Island, using the view out to the ocean as a means to segue into a general description of the geography and natural history of the New Hebrides. In the second chapter he provides a concise summary of the rudiments of the islanders’ economy and culture in the times before European contact. At the end he outlines his own motivations for living among them: “I came by chance to live there especially and to learn their ways. I gathered and killed pigs myself to enter their first stage towards chiefliness. The balanced system of classless capitalism, typical of the whole New Hebrides, came easy to me. I was fascinated by this intricate, unnecessary system which defeated the attempts of a damp, static environment. Every man had more than enough for himself and success …” In the following chapter, 'The Last Conquistador,' Harrisson proceeded to write a history of the first encounter with Europeans – a shipload of Spaniards under the command of Pedro Fernandez de Quiros. He summarizes the experience of the locals: “These unfamiliar people whom they had welcomed as something supernatural, turned out to be not only sudden, unaccountable butchers … but also treacherous thieves, men who mutilated corpses and even broke the rules of war so far as to kill a chief. To the natives it seemed incredible that there were people who could actually steal pigs [italics in original]. That made the breach irreparable."

In the rest of the first part of the book, Harrisson recounts the history of the years following de Quiros’ visit: the exploitation of the sandalwood trees, the arrival of missionaries (often Polynesians at first), the infestation of “blackbirds” (Europeans who went to the islands to persuade or coerce the local men to sign on as labourers for plantations in Australia), and later still, the activities of white plantation owners on the islands themselves. The section ends with a description of the contemporary economic and political status of the New Herbrides.

In the second part of the book, Harrisson moves from historical description to his own experiences on the islands. It again starts with Mount Taburenasana – a narrative of his own ascent despite having only partially recovered from an infected wound in his knee. But the focus quickly changes in the next chapter to an account of his travels where he sees first hand the culture of the people and the effects of the various diseases introduced by the whites. There is also a moving portrayal of Antonio Bruno Siller, a poverty-stricken white trader whom Harrisson befriended and eventually helped to bury. The final two chapters cover his time with the Big Nambas, his tenure as British official on Malekula and then his encounter with Hollywood in the person of Douglas Fairbanks. Here he is quite candid about his part in creating fictional cannibals for the projected movie, but he also notes how it got him out of the depression he was experiencing because of his encounter with the savage (white) civilisation on the islands.

== Reviews/Reception ==
Savage Civilisation was reviewed in a number of scholarly journals. In Man, the anthropologist John Layard wrote that “the book unfolds itself, as an Elizabethan drama with scenes, short and long, trenchant sketches of black and white kaleidoscopically mixed." And although Harrisson wrote in “a light vein as a concession both to his own vitality and to the need of publication, the work also demonstrated his skills as “a serious student” of anthropology. In this regard, Layard saw the book as a valuable “mine of information on native life." But he was also quick to note that this attempt to produce a serious work of anthropology that would at the same time appeal to a popular audience had its drawbacks as his descriptions, although “thrilling to read” lack “detail."

The Geographical Journal of the Royal Geographical Society also published a review. It summarized the work as “an interesting and vigorous study of ritual life in the New Hebrides” describing the language as “incisive and gripping." The author noted that it was an “unorthodox book” made possible by Harrisson’s complete immersion in native life and that although the work would “have critics” it would be criticism “of style rather than substance." The review ended with an expression of astonishment that Harrisson was able to write “from memory, this hitherto untold story of the New Hebrides … a remarkable achievement; but Mr Harrisson is a remarkable man."

A. Irving Hallowell, writing for The Annals of the American Academy of Political and Social Science introduced Savage Civilisation as “an unconventionally written but thoroughly reliable history.” Like Layard, however, Hallowell noted that it was not strictly an ethnographical account, although “his observations are extraordinarily keen."

The American Sociological Review published a review by Gladys Bryson. She declared the book as having “great vigor and a fresh point of view at the same time that it embodies a good knowledge of anthropological theory” (276). She went on to write that “it is much more than a delightful travel book, much less than a thorough monographic study of a single tribe." Harrisson’s style of writing she described as “angular – vigorous, slangy, not to be laid side by side with any copy books, but here and there sensitive and beautiful."

Savage Civilisation was also reviewed by more specialized journals. In the Burlington Magazine for Connoisseurs, Harrisson’s contribution to the study of Melanesian art was the focus. The book was described as “remarkable” and its style as “refreshingly vital." It was noted that although the section formerly devoted to art was very short, it was “concentrated” and that overall “the reader is likely to emerge with a better understanding of savage art than most anthropological books (even in their totality) supply."

Finally, an anonymous review appeared in the Quarterly Review of Biology. It too was most favourable: “… this is in many ways a remarkable work whether one chooses to consider it as a travel book or as a treatise on the anthropology of primitive peoples." Harrisson iconoclastic methods and views attracted the reviewer’s attention: “At frequent intervals remarks of a sort not customarily made by well brought up anthropologists are injected into the narrative." The reviewer made it clear that Harrisson’s views were to be given considerable weight for he noted that whereas most anthropologists “do not more than delude themselves into believing that they are living like natives” Harrisson “actually went native." The review ended with an extensive quotation from the book giving Harrisson’s frank opinion of what at that time was seen as the standard work on the people of the region.

== Contemporary study ==
Savage Civilisation represents a bridge between the older discipline of anthropology and the younger one of cultural studies, according to Gareth Stanton. He argues that while Harrisson was aware of the anthropological literature of his time, his critique of colonialism and his contextualization of the society he studied within a wider capitalist framework set the work apart from traditional anthropology, aligning it with what was to become the tradition of cultural studies.

Rod Edmond includes a discussion of Savage Civilisation in his chapter on Harrisson in the edited volume, Writing, Travel, and Empire: In the Margins of Anthropology. He argues that the title of Harrisson’s book was chosen to cast doubt in the readers’ mind about the common oppositional relationship between these terms. For Edmond this was a rhetorical strategy that was used throughout the book as “savage practices are juxtaposed with European ones in order to demonstrate equivalence or comparability." The ultimate aim, according to Edmond, was “to normalize lifeways that otherwise appear strange (that is savage) and invite us to consider our own culture as an outsider might." Edmond also sees the book as being important not just for this work of cultural contextualization, but also because it was the first to challenge the theory, championed by the anthropologist William Halse Rivers Rivers, of the psychological death of entire cultures. According to this theory, the native peoples of New Hebrides had been degenerating since before the arrival of the Europeans. Harrisson’s census work, adapted from his knowledge and study of ornithology, showed that it was only in the mountainous interior that population decline continued. On the coast, the local people had adapted to the many diseases brought by the whites. These populations were stable or even rising in areas that hosted missionary medical clinics. Furthermore, Edmond argues, Harrisson demonstrated through his own first hand experience that local warfare was neither bloody nor vicious. There were in fact clear rules, few fatalities and women and children were left alone. It could not be the cause of depopulation. Finally, Edmond sees Savage Civilisation as important because it was also one the first works to take seriously the idea that the culture of the New Hebrides had never been static. It was constantly changing and adapting as “part of a larger oceanic world in which Melanesians and Polynesians had mixed and traded freely."
