= John Baker (biologist) =

British biologist and zoologist

John Randal Baker
- Baker in the 1930s
- Born: 23 October 1900; Woodbridge, Suffolk
- Died: 8 June 1984 (aged 83)
- Citizenship: British
- Education: University of Oxford
- Scientific career
- Fields: Biology, physical anthropology
- Workplaces: University of Oxford
- Thesis: Sex studies on mammals (1927)
- Doctoral students: Jock Marshall

John Randal Baker FRS (23 October 1900 – 8 June 1984) was an English biologist, zoologist, and microscopist, and a professor at the University of Oxford, where he was Emeritus Reader in Cytology. He received his D.Phil. at the University of Oxford in 1927.

== Early life ==
Baker was the youngest of five children born to Rear Admiral Julian Alleyne Baker and his wife Geraldine Eugenie (née Alison). He was a grandson of General Sir Archibald Alison and among the papers collected in Baker's name at the Bodleian Library are volumes of correspondence and other material related to Alison's military service during the Indian Mutiny, Ashanti Campaign, and Egyptian Campaign of 1882.

Born in Woodbridge, Baker grew up in a country home near Bromyard. At age ten, he was sent to Boxgrove School, near Guildford. Due to World War I, his schooling there was cut short and he joined the Bournemouth School of Flying at age sixteen. Though he achieved a pilot's certificate, he was excluded from the Royal Flying Corps due to inadequate eyesight and thereafter joined the Oxford University Officers' Training Corps.

Upon war's end, Baker entered Oxford's New College, where he studied zoology. Among the small staff of the Department of Zoology and Comparative Anatomy was Dr. (later Sir) Julian Huxley, of whom Baker would write a biographical memoir many years later. Other students in the department during Baker's time included Charles Elton, E. B. Ford, Alister Hardy and Carlos Blacker. Baker became the captain of New College's rowing team and completed his B.A. with first class honours in 1922, partially on the basis of his microscopical investigation of spermatogenesis in crickets.

== Expeditions ==
Baker participated in several overseas research expeditions following his undergraduate work. An anthropological and zoological mission headed by Professor T. T. Barnard in 1922 provided the first of three visits to the New Hebrides Islands, where Baker turned his attention to the influence of a relatively non-seasonal climate on the breeding seasons and sexual activity of animals. He also became interested in the hermaphroditic pigs bred by the native people for use in rituals of initiation and, later, in comparing them with the intersex pigs of Britain. Examination of the anatomical and histological characteristics of these animals, in conjunction with research into factors of sex determination and development of sexual organs, led to his book Sex in man and animals (1926).

In 1927, Baker returned to the New Hebrides for a year. On this trip, his study of the native population and interest in reproduction became focused on questions of human population control, about the growth of which he and many others had become concerned. His research in this area would eleven years later issue in the development of the contraceptive spermicide Volpar and, for this work, he would in 1958 receive the Oliver Bird Medal from the Family Planning Association. Interestingly, Baker's great-grandfather, Sir Archibald Alison, had in 1840 published a book titled The principles of population.

In 1933, under the auspices of the Oxford University Exploration Club founded by his schoolmate Charles Elton, Baker organized and led the Oxford Expedition to the New Hebrides, the primary focus of which was to investigate the influence of environmental factors on the breeding seasons of rainforest fauna. Additional purposes included specimen collection and surveying. The company included his wife Inezita and sister Geraldine - who had collaborated with him on previous research, ornithologist Tom Harrisson, zoologist and surveyor Terence Bird, and naturalist A. J. Marshall. One of the expedition's accomplishments was the first ascent and mapping of Mount Tabwemasana, the highest peak in the New Hebrides. The resultant map was used by the U.S. Army during their World War II occupation of the islands.

== Work ==
The most widely received of his works was Race (1974). Uncharacteristically for the time, Baker used the traditional categories of physical anthropology and classified human populations in terms of race.

Baker rejected the methodological relativism that had characterized anthropology since the days of Franz Boas, instead going back to earlier ideas of hereditarianism and cultural evolution. The book received mixed reviews.

In Race, Baker used a restrictive sense of the term "civilization", giving 21 criteria (Note: 1. Clothes covering genitals and most of the trunk; 2. Body cleanliness and waste disposal; 3. No mutilation or body deformation; 4. Buildings in brick or stone; 5. Towns and cities linked by roads; 6. Agriculture; 7. Animal domestication; 8. Metalwork; 9. Knowledge of wheel; 10. Use of money; 11. Laws; 12. Trials with witnesses; 13. No torture; 14. No cannibalism; 15. Religion with ethical elements; 16. Writing system; 17. Basic maths; 18. Calendar; 19. Schooling system (at least primary); 20. Fine arts; 21. Knowledge and understanding not necessarily practical) by which civilizations might be identified. Based on these criteria, Baker declared that Mesoamerican societies such as those of the Aztecs and Maya were not civilizations, and that no indigenous civilizations ever arose in Africa. He enumerated five civilizations (Sumerian, ancient Egyptian, Helladic-Minoan, Indus Valley, and Sinic) sensu stricto and explored the relationship between the biological traits and the cultures of these five civilizations. In this book, Baker speculated that different human races evolved from different subspecies of apes (known as polygenism). Baker claimed that "negrids" were less evolved, and also inferior, to races Baker described as civilized. Baker also quotes Long's claim that black people have a "fetid smell". According to a 1974 review by A. O. Ladimeji in Race & Class, Baker misrepresents or misunderstands the history of the study of race. Per Ladimeji, "Most of Baker's biological data comes from the nineteenth century with no corroboration from recent research." Ladimeji wrote that most of Baker's more outlandish claims had already been refuted by available studies at the time of publication.

Together with Michael Polanyi, Baker founded the Society for Freedom in Science in 1940. In March, 1958 he was elected a Fellow of the Royal Society.

== Bibliography ==
- Sex in man and animals; with a preface by Julian S. Huxley, 1926
- Man and animals in the New Hebrides, 1929
- Cytological technique, 1933
- Biology in everyday life, 1934
- Chemical control of conception, with a chapter by H. M. Carleton, 1935
- Scientific life, 1942
- Science and the planned state, 1945
- Discovery of the uses of colouring agents in biological micro-technique, 1945
- Path of science, by C. E. Kenneth Mees ... with the cooperation of John R. Baker ... 1946
- Principles of biological microtechnique; a study of fixation and dyeing, 1958
- Cytological technique; the principles underlying routine methods, 1960
- Cell structure and its interpretation; essays presented to John Randal Baker, F.R.S. Edited by S. M. McGee-Russell and K. F. A. Ross, 1968
- Baker, John R. (1974). Race. London: Oxford University Press. ISBN 0-19-212954-6.
- Evolution : the modern synthesis by Julian Huxley; with a new introd. edited by John R. Baker, 1974
- Freedom of science, 1975
- Julian Huxley, scientist and world citizen, 1887 to 1975 : a biographical memoir, with a bibliography compiled by Jens-Peter Green, 1978
- Biology of parasitic protozoa, 1982
- Cell theory : a restatement, history, and critique, 1988

== See also ==
- Carleton S. Coon
