= John Beynon Nicholas =

John Beynon Nicholas (1888–1966) was a Welsh schoolteacher, activist and advertising agent.

Nicholas was born in Llanelly, the eldest of 6 children born to David Nicholas, a tin plate worker, and Sarah Hughes. After his mother died in 1907, his father remarried the following year.

Nicholas became a schoolteacher. A Liberal activist, he supplied cartoons to The Common Cause in support of women's suffrage in 1914. By 1922 he had left teaching to be art director at the Holford Bottomley Advertising Agency. He was later a partner in the Rumble, Crowther and Nicholas Agency, and one of the founders of the Advertising Services Guild (ASG). As ASG Chairman, he called on the government to issue more vigorous propaganda, and commissioned the Mass Observation report Home Propaganda.
