= Barbara Harrison =

Barbara Harrison may refer to:

- Barbara Harrison Wescott (1904–1977), American publisher, née Barbara Harrison
- Barbara Grizzuti Harrison (1934–2002), American writer
- Barbara Jane Harrison (1945–1968), British air stewardess and recipient of the George Cross

== See also ==
- Barbara Harrisson (1922–2015), German-British art historian who also contributed scientifically to nature conservation, primatology, anthropology, and archaeology
