= Housewife, 49 =

2006 British television film by Gavin Millar

- DVD cover
- Genre: Drama
- Created by: Victoria Wood
- Written by: Victoria Wood; Nella Last
- Directed by: Gavin Millar
- Starring: Victoria Wood; David Threlfall; Christopher Harper; Ben Crompton; Lorraine Ashbourne; Sally Bankes; Stephanie Cole; Marcia Warren; Sylvestra Le Touzel; Wendy Nottingham; Jane Lowe; Dorothy Atkinson; Sian Brooke; Laura Power; Jason Watkins
- Country of origin: United Kingdom
- Original language: English

Production
- Production locations: Barrow-in-Furness, England

Original release
- Network: ITV
- Release: 10 December 2006

Housewife, 49 is a 2006 television drama film based on the wartime diaries of Nella Last. Written by and starring English actress and comedian Victoria Wood, it follows the experiences of an ordinary housewife and mother in the northern English town of Barrow-in-Furness, Lancashire, during the Second World War. It was first broadcast in the UK by ITV on 10 December 2006.

== Plot ==
The Mass-Observation project was set up in 1937 by Charles Madge, a poet and journalist and Tom Harrisson, an anthropologist to 'record the voice of ordinary people'. They recruited volunteer 'observers' to report to them and in 1939 invited people to send them an account of their lives. Nella Last was one of 500 people who took up this offer.

Her diaries sent weekly are headed "Housewife, 49", her age when she first began the correspondence. Her diaries sent to Mass-Observation, often written in pencil, provide the narrative of the play as it unfolds her life. Edited versions of her diary have been published:

Nella Last's War edited by Richard Broad and Suzy Fleming appeared first in 1981 and has been more recently re-published by Profile Books in 2007. Housewife, 49 is based on this book which covers the years 1939 to 1945.

Nella Last's Peace, which appeared in 2009, includes diary entries from her immediate post-war years. A third volume, Nella Last in the 1950s: Further diaries of Housewife, 49, which includes material not published in Nella Last's War, was published in 2010.

In some scenes, the staff of Mass-Observation are seen reacting to, and sometimes visibly moved by, her letters. During the course of the programme, Last moves from being an introverted, isolated, and depressed individual in a difficult marriage, to become an outgoing character who, through her voluntary work during wartime, becomes a backbone of the local community. At the end of the programme it is explained that Nella continued to write to Mass-Observation until her death in 1968. The original diary, together with hundreds of other diaries and Mass-Observation's other papers, are now held within the Mass-Observation Archive, housed by the University of Sussex at The Keep, Brighton.

It also documents the lead character's changing relationships with those around her; standing up to her domineering husband (David Threlfall), developing a close but sometimes strained friendship with Mrs Waite (Stephanie Cole) the head of the local Women's Voluntary Service, and her changing relationships with her eldest son Arthur (Ben Crompton), and her younger son Cliff (Christopher Harper) who is altered by his experiences of combat. It is also implied that Cliff, who in real life became a sculptor in Australia, was gay; although Nella either does not realise or refuses to acknowledge it.

== Cast ==
- Victoria Wood as Nella Last, Housewife 49
- David Threlfall as 'Daddy', husband Will Last
- Christopher Harper as Cliff Last, youngest son
- Ben Crompton as Arthur Last, eldest son
- Lorraine Ashbourne as Dot, Nella's sister in law
- Sally Bankes as Mrs Whittaker
- Stephanie Cole as Mrs Waite, head of the Local WVS
- Jason Watkins as Roger

== Reception ==
The Guardian thought it revealed Victoria Wood "to be both a far better writer than we had ever guessed and a far better actor as well."

The film won two British Academy Television Awards in 2007: "Best Single Drama", and "Best Actress" for Victoria Wood for her portrayal of Nella Last. It also won Best Single Drama at the Royal Television Society Programme Awards and received a nominations for Costume Design - Drama at the Royal Television Society Craft & Design Awards.

== Home media ==
Housewife, 49 was released on Region 2 DVD on 21 May 2007 and on Region 1 DVD on 11 March 2008.

== Stage adaptation ==
In September 2013, Victoria Wood chose the small Old Laundry theatre in Bowness-on-Windermere as the venue for the premiere of the stage version of Housewife 49.

== Bibliography ==
- Nellie Last (2006). Nella Last's War: The Second World War Diaries of 'Housewife, 49'. Profile Books. ISBN 978-1-84668-000-7.
