= Oxford University Exploration Club =

- Formation: 1927
- Type: Student Exploration Society
- Headquarters: Oxford, England
- President: Michael Murphy Keble College, Oxford
- Website: www.ouec.co.uk

The Oxford University Exploration Club was established in December 1927 by Edward Max Nicholson, Colin Trapnell, and Charles Sutherland Elton.

The Club's aim is to support and advise students with planning original expeditions abroad. Recent expeditions to Tibet, the Congo, Greenland, Trinidad, Mongolia, Svalbard, Namibia, Papua New Guinea and the remote Comoros Islands have discovered new species of birds, insects and plants, published scientific papers on the rainforest canopy, found some of the world’s deepest caves, scaled unclimbed peaks and recorded the folk music of nomads; all in co-operation and collaboration with local people and organisations.

The Club was merged in 1965 with the Oxford University Women's Exploration Club (founded by Henrietta Hutton), with equal status granted for both male and female members.

Former members include:

- Edward Shackleton, Baron Shackleton - Chairman 1932-33, member of the 1932 expedition to Sarawak in Borneo, organised by Tom Harrisson, along with the Oxford University Ellesmere Land Expedition (led by Gordon Noel Humphreys)
- Wilfred Thesiger - Treasurer of the Club's Committee 1931-1932
- Alex Hibbert
- John Buchan - President 1930 - 1934
- Gerald Harvey Thompson - assistant entomologist on the 1938 expedition to the Cayman Islands
- James Fisher (naturalist) - Junior Treasurer 1932-34
- Andrew Croft - Oxford University Arctic Expedition, 1935–36
- Kenneth Mason (geographer) - Vice President 1933 - 1938
- Mensun Bound & Joanna Yellowless-Bound (Archaeologist) - Giglio Wreck Excavation 1982-1985
- James Kempton - President 2022-2023. Led Expedition Cyclops.

== Previous expeditions ==
- Oxford University Greenland Expedition, 1928
- Oxford University British Guiana Expedition, 1929
- Oxford University Expedition to Lapland, 1930
- Oxford University Hudson Strait Expedition, 1931
- Oxford University Expedition to Sarawak (Borneo), 1932
- Oxford University Arctic Expedition (Spitsbergen), 1933
- Oxford University New Hebrides Expedition, 1933
- Abyssinia Expedition, 1933
- Oxford University Ellesmere Land Expedition, 1934–35
- Oxford University Greenland Expedition 1935
- Oxford University Arctic Expedition (North-East Land), 1935–36
- Oxford University Greenland Expedition, 1936
- The Faeroes Biological Expedition, 1937
- Giglio Wreck Excavation 1982-1985
- Príncipe Past & Present (Príncipe Island, São Tomé and Príncipe) - https://www.principepastandpresent.com/
- Expedition Cyclops, 2023 - https://www.expeditioncyclops.org/

== Presidents ==
- Michael Murphy 2024-2025
- Matthew Buckley 2023-2024
- James Kempton 2022-2023
- Carla V. Fuenteslópez, 2021–22
- Emily Brannigan, 2020–21
- Matt Jones, 2019–20
- Isabel Carter, 2018–19
- Will Hartz, 2016–17

== Bibliography ==
- The Times July 15, 1935. pg. 15
- 1928 - 1937 Annual Reports, Oxford University Exploration Club
