= Alex Hibbert =

British polar explorer

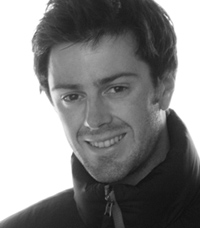
- Hibbert in 2010
- Born: 19 April 1986 (age 40); Southsea, Hampshire, England
- Education: Canford School
- Alma mater: St Hugh's College, Oxford
- Occupations: Athlete (Cross-country skiing, Mountaineering, Rowing, Triathlon, Kayaking), Polar explorer, author, speaker, photographer
- Years active: 2006–present
- Known for: Tiso TransGreenland; The Long Haul

Alexander Piers William Hibbert (born 19 April 1986) is a British polar expedition leader, public speaker, author and photographer. He lives in London.

== Family and education ==
Hibbert was born in Southsea, England, the second son of Commodore Richard Hibbert CBE RN, an officer in the Royal Navy. The younger of two brothers, Hibbert attended Canford School before reading biological sciences at St Hugh's College, Oxford. Whilst attending University of Oxford, Hibbert was actively involved in the Oxford University Exploration Club, The Oxford Union and college boat clubs. He graduated in 2007. Hibbert trained for 12 months in the Royal Marines young officer batch from September 2008, withdrawing shortly before completion due to injury.

== Expeditions ==
In 2008, along with his teammate George Bullard, Hibbert crossed the Greenland icecap twice, along a new route, in 113 days. This expedition held the record for the longest unsupported journey in any polar region, and after the 2011 expedition by Aleksander Gamme, still holds the record in the Arctic.

In January 2011, he announced that he would attempt to break the speed record for crossing the Greenland icecap. The current Norwegian-held record stands at 8 days 9 hours. In order to break the record Hibbert stated that he and his teammate planned to ski in excess of 40 miles (64 kilometres) and up to 15 hours per day. Although the team was positioned on the Greenlandic coast on schedule, the planned attempt in April 2011 was not made, as low barometric pressure and low cloud cover in the Arctic kept them stranded in Tasiilaq, Greenland for more than a week.

The second attempt on the speed record did take place, starting on 12 August, but was completed outside record pace in less than twelve days. Heavily crevassed and turbulent glacial ice and high winds on the plateau contributed to delays. The pair returned to London on 25 August after flying by helicopter and aircraft from their final position on the Russell Glacier.

== Society elections ==
Having been elected a Fellow of the Royal Geographical Society in 2007 and a Member of The Explorers Club in 2010, Hibbert relinquished both positions in 2012. He cited a reduction of the value of such titles and memberships in his book Maybe as the reason, stating that they latterly lacked distinction and acted purely as revenue generation for societies.

In 2017 Hibbert was awarded an honorary doctorate by the University of Portsmouth.

== The Dark Ice Project ==
Hibbert announced plans to reach the Geographic North Pole unsupported in the darkness of winter from the last feasible starting point as yet unattained. The first attempt to launch the first phase ended when Hibbert's teammate suffered a hernia and the pair had to walk back to Qaanaaq. In 2013 the project was relaunched with a new team but despite good health, it was again cancelled due to adverse ice conditions in the northern Nares Strait. They remained in the Qaanaaq region of the High Arctic and integrated with the local Inughuit, driving over 1,000 miles (1,600 kilometres) with large Thule dogs, similar to Greenland dogs.

Sponsor websites appear to show that the project was due to relaunch in the winter of 2020/21. An update announced its cancellation due to the COVID-19 pandemic.

== Publishing ==
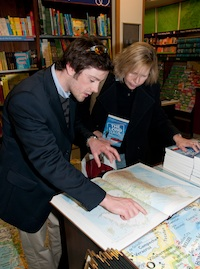
The launch of The Long Haul, March 2010

Hibbert's first book was an account of his university years and the Tiso TransGreenland expedition, titled The Long Haul, which was published by Tricorn Books in March 2010, and launched in Stanford's travel bookstore in London. It attracted positive reviews from Wanderlust magazine and Sir Ranulph Fiennes.

A paperback, Maybe, was announced as due for publishing in late May 2013. The subject matter is a move towards social commentary combined with expedition accounts. Maybe received mostly positive reviews despite some negativity regarding his forceful and direct style of peer review.

In 2018, Polar Eskimo was published. The book was part travelogue and part social and political commentary surrounding Greenland's past, present and future, including indigenous rights. It was reviewed as 'one of the most rewarding books on exploration and wilderness' by Sidetracked.

== Television ==
Hibbert competed along with fellow graduates of St Hugh's College, Oxford in the 2013 of Christmas University Challenge. They defeated the University of Stirling but did not reach the final.

== Photographer ==
Hibbert was a finalist in the international BBC Wildlife Photographer of the Year competition in 2003, 2004 and 2010 and was agency signed from the age of eighteen. He contributed exclusively to Getty Images, Oxford Scientific Films and Robert Harding World Imagery. Hibbert was one of the judging panel on the STA Travel Photo Competition 2010, along with senior figures from the photographic industry.
