= Nella Last =

British diarist (1889–1968)

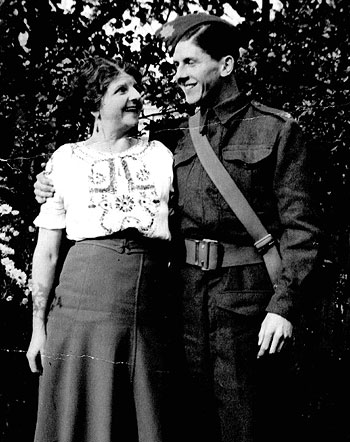
- Nella Last (left) with her son Cliff
- Born: Nellie Lord; 4 October 1889; Barrow-in-Furness, Lancashire, England
- Died: 22 June 1968 (aged 78); Barrow-in Furness, Lancashire, England
- Occupation: Housewife
- Notable work: Her 12 million word Mass-Observation diary
- Spouse: Will Last (m. 1911)
- Children: Arthur and Clifford

Nella Last (née Nellie Lord; 4 October 1889 – 22 June 1968) was an English housewife and diarist who lived in Barrow-in-Furness, Lancashire, England. She wrote a diary for the Mass Observation Archive from 1939 until 1966, making it one of the most substantial diaries held by Mass Observation. Her diary, consisting of around 12 million words, two million of which were written during World War II, is one of the longest in the English language.

== Biography ==
She was the daughter of local railway clerk John Lord. She married Will Last on 17 May 1911, a shopfitter and joiner. They had two sons, Arthur (8 August 1913 – 18 May 1979) and Clifford (13 December 1918 – 20 October 1991). During the Second World War, she volunteered for the Women's Voluntary Service (WVS) and the British Red Cross.

An edited version of the two million words or so she wrote during World War II was originally published in 1981 as Nella Last's War: A Mother's Diary, 1939-45, and republished as Nella Last's War: The Second World War Diaries of 'Housewife, 49' in 2006 when interest in her work grew. Last's diary from January 1944 to the beginning of May 1945 is currently missing, as it was lost from the Mass Observation collection before it was moved to Sussex University. A second volume of her diaries, Nella Last's Peace: The Post-war Diaries of Housewife 49, was published in October 2008, and a third and final volume Nella Last in the 1950s appeared in October 2010.

Her published writing describes what it was like for ordinary people to live through World War II, reporting on the bombing of Barrow in April 1941 (including her own home at 9 Ilkley Road) and offering her reflections on a wide range of contemporary issues. Some critics, such as Edward Blishen, see a proto-feminism that anticipates the post-war women's movement in her account of her own marriage and her liberation from housewifery through her war work.

Her younger son Clifford Last (1918–1991) emigrated to Australia following the war and went on to become a noted sculptor, with works displayed at the Ballarat Fine Art Gallery.

Last died on 22 June 1968, aged 78. Her husband Will died on 19 May 1969.

== TV film ==
Last's wartime diaries were dramatised by Victoria Wood for ITV in 2006 as Housewife, 49, which is how she headed her first entry at the age of 49. Wood played the role of Last.
