= Farewell to the King (novel) =

1969 novel by Pierre Schoendoerffer

- Author: Pierre Schoendoerffer
- Original title: L'Adieu au Roi
- Translator: Xan Fielding
- Language: French
- Publisher: Éditions Grasset
- Publication date: 1 December 1969
- Publication place: France
- English publication date: 1 September 1970
- Pages: 299

Farewell to the King (French: L'Adieu au Roi) is a 1969 novel by the French writer Pierre Schoendoerffer.

== Plot ==
The novel is set during World War II and centres on Learoyd, an Irish deserter from the battle of Singapore, who has become the king of a headhunting tribe in the jungles of Borneo.

An inspiration for the main character was Tom Harrisson. Schoendoerffer originally conceived the story as a film project, but changed it into a novel.

== Reception ==
The novel became a bestseller in France. It was awarded the Prix Interallié.

Kirkus Reviews wrote that the novel is reminiscent of Joseph Conrad's works. The critic complimented Schoendoerffer's "use of a raw and terrifying jungle landscape" to portray "the varied ethic of war", but wrote that there is "an excess of tremulous commentary which transports Learoyd out of belief and reality".

== Adaptations ==
There were unrealised plans in the early 1970s for Schoendoerffer to direct his own film adaptation of the novel. The novel is the basis for the 1989 American film Farewell to the King, directed by John Milius.
