= Joe Moran (social historian) =

British historian

- Education: Leeds University; Sussex University
- Occupation: Historian
- Employer: Liverpool John Moores University
- Title: Professor
- Website: https://joemoran.net/

Joe Moran is a historian and writer with an interest in the social and cultural history of modern Britain. Moran is a professor of English and Cultural History at Liverpool John Moores University who studies and writes about everyday life from the mid-twentieth century until the present day. In addition to his academic work, he has published several nonfiction books, and occasionally writes for newspapers and magazines.

Moran studied international history and politics at Leeds University before doing an MA degree in English literature and a DPhil in American studies at Sussex University. He is now a professor of English and Cultural History at Liverpool John Moores University.

Moran is interested in studying the everyday experience of ordinary people. Moran describes himself as influenced by Mass-Observation and a French ethnography of the quotidian or infraordinary, exemplified by works by Georges Perec, Marc Augé and François Bon. The Mass-Observation Archive at Sussex contributed to Moran's interest in this area. He also says that the I-Spy booklets he consumed as a young boy helped develop an interest in taking note of things that normally go unnoticed.

Quoting Doreen Massey, Moran says that despite every generation's emphasis on change, "much of life for many people 'still consists of waiting in a bus shelter with your shopping for a bus that never comes'"; he describes himself as "trying to find a critical language to talk about these empty, purposeless moments of daily life, filled with activities such as commuting and office routines, that we generally take for granted but that take up so much of our lives."

Moran's book Queuing for Beginners is a chronological account, from breakfast to bed, of a normal British day and how it has changed since the nineteenth century and more particularly since the 1930s; the book received favourable reviews.

Moran's book, First You Write a Sentence, published in 2018, is a guide to writing well-versed sentences. Moran has also written for The Guardian and the New Statesman.

== Books ==
- Star Authors: Literary Celebrity in America. London: Pluto Press, 1999. ISBN 0-7453-1519-4. (At Google Books.)
- Interdisciplinarity. London: Routledge. Hardback: 2001; ISBN 0-415-25131-1. Paperback: 2002; ISBN 0-415-25132-X. (At Google Books.)
- Reading the Everyday. London: Routledge, 2005. Hardback: ISBN 0-415-31708-8. Paperback: ISBN 0-415-31709-6. (At Google Books.)
- Queuing for Beginners: The Story of Daily Life from Breakfast to Bedtime. Hardback. London: Profile Books, 2007. ISBN 0-7432-5920-3. Paperback. London: Profile Books, 2008. ISBN 1-86197-841-3.
- On Roads: A Hidden History. Hardback. London: Profile Books, 2009. ISBN 1-84668-052-2.
- Armchair Nation: An intimate history of Britain in front of the TV. Hardback. London: Profile Books, 2013. ISBN 978-1-84668-391-6.
- Shrinking Violets: a field guide to shyness. London: Profile Books. 2016. ISBN 978-1-78125-263-5.
- First You Write a Sentence: The Elements of Reading, Writing ... and Life. Viking. 2018. ISBN 978-0-241-97849-8.
- If You Should Fail: A Book of Solace. Hardback. London: Viking Books, 2020.
