= Niah National Park =

National park in Sarawak, Malaysia

Niah Caves
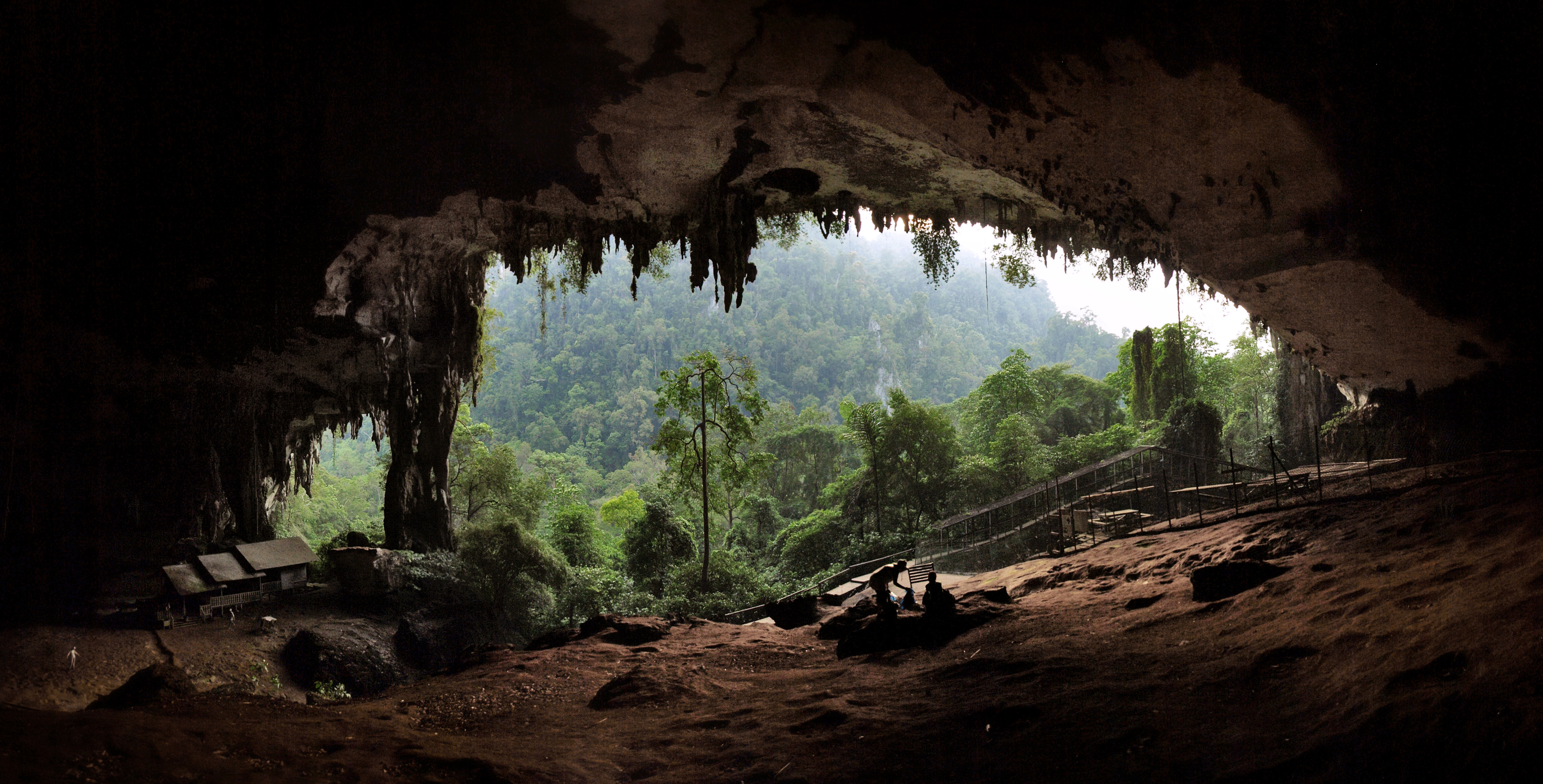
- The main entrance to the Niah Caves at sunset

- Location within Borneo Location within Malaysia
- Coordinates: 3°48′50″N 113°46′53″E
- Discovery: 1950
- Entrances: 1

UNESCO World Heritage Site
- Official name: The Archaeological Heritage of Niah National Park's Caves Complex
- Type: Cultural
- Criteria: iii, v
- Designated: 2024 (46th session)
- Reference no.: 1014
- Region: Asia-Pacific

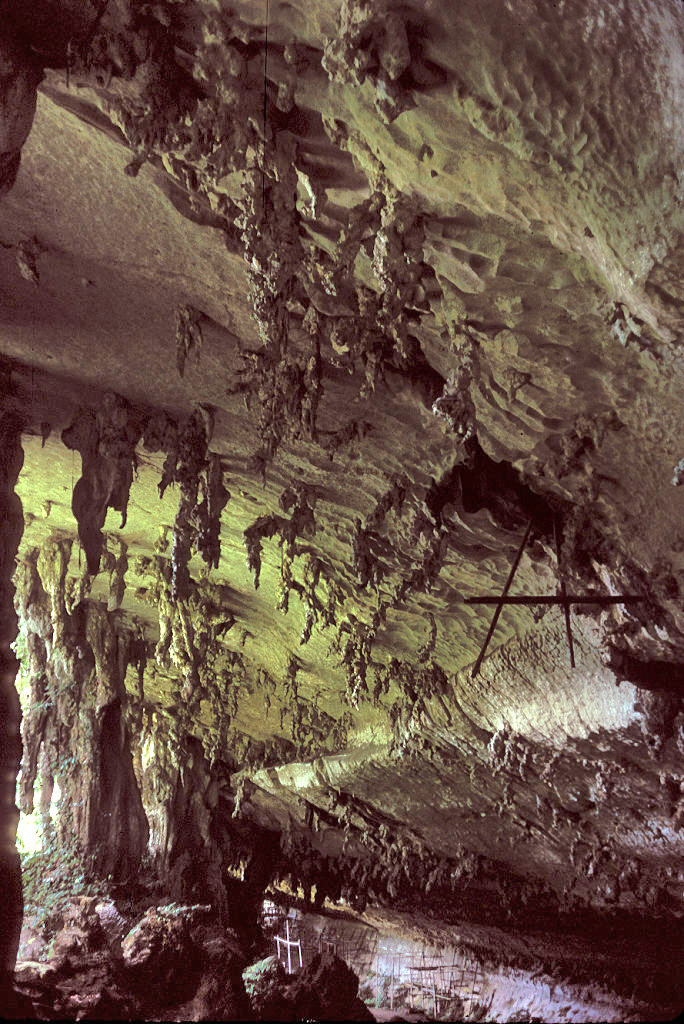
Niah Caves

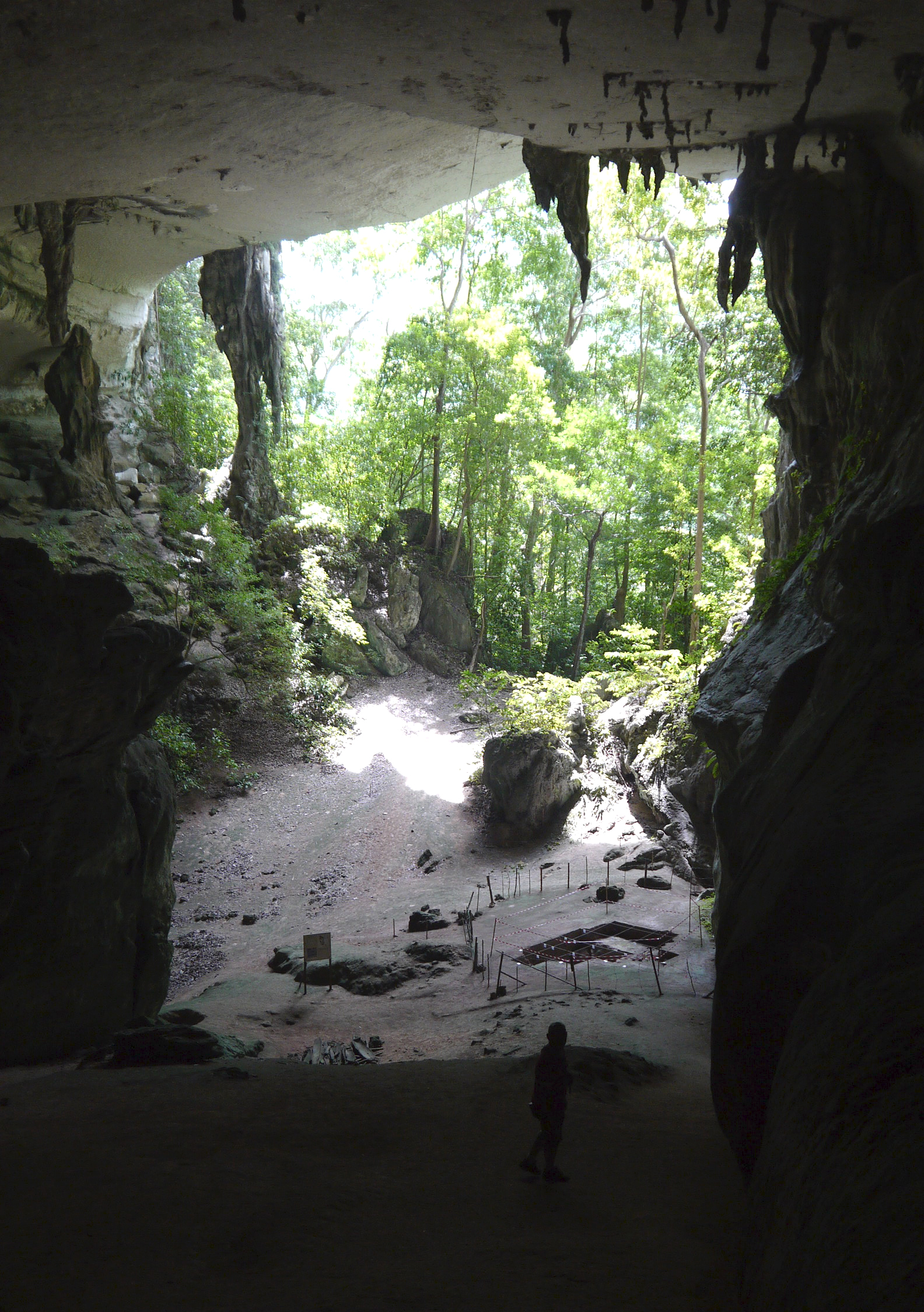
An archaeological site at the Painted Cave (Kain Hitam). Painted Cave is a small but archaeologically significant cave located south of the Niah Great Cave complex where ancient burial sites and cave paintings can be seen.

Niah National Park, located within Miri Division, Sarawak, Malaysia, is the site of the Niah Caves which are an archeological site.

== History ==
Alfred Russel Wallace lived for 8 months at Simunjan District with a mining engineer, Robert Coulson, who had explored what is now northern Sarawak for mineral ores. Coulson later wrote to Wallace about finding bones in a number of caves in Sarawak. On further enquiry, Wallace learned that one cave in question "was situated in the district between Sarawak and Bruni (Brunei), on a mountain some distance inland." In March 1864, Wallace favoured Coulson to explore the caves. However, later in May 1864, G. J. Ricketts, a British Consul to Sarawak was appointed to undertake the work. Ricketts did not remain in the post for long and subsequently Alfred Hart Everett was chosen to undertake the work. Everett surveyed 32 caves in three areas, including Niah/Subis (near Miri) and "Upper Sarawak Proper" (upriver of the Sarawak River at Bau).. However, the first published account of a visit to 'The Caves of Mount Sobis', long attributed to Everett, is now known to have been by William Maunder Crocker.

In the 1950s, Tom Harrisson, the curator of Sarawak State Museum was searching for evidence of ancient human activity in Sarawak. He came across Niah Cave, which showed no evidence of ancient human activity in the area. However, he inferred that since the cave was cool and dry and there were millions of bats and swiflets which could be used as food, ancient humans could have lived in the cave. Therefore, in October 1954, Harrisson with his two friends, Michael Tweedie and Hugh Gibb spent two weeks examining the Niah. They found evidence of long term human occupation, habitation, and burial. In 1957, the Sarawak museum organised a larger expedition with transport and equipment from Brunei Shell Petroleum and Sarawak Oilfields Ltd (Shell). Earthernware, shell scrapers, shell ornaments, stone pounders, bone tools, and food remains were found. Radiocarbon dating of the charcoal layers put the site at 40,000 years old, dating back to the Paleolithic era. The expedition team led by Barbara Harrisson discovered the "Deep Skull" in the "Hell Trench" (named for its unusually hot condition) at 101 to 110 inches below surface in February 1958. It is a partial skull with maxilla, two molar teeth and a portion of the base of the skull. The skull is highly fragile and is not fossilised. The morphology of the skull suggests it belonged to a female in her late teens to mid-twenties. Near the skull, a complete left femur and right proximal tibia were found which belonged to the same individual. Tom Harrisson also discovered Neolithic burial sites from 2,500 to 5,000 years ago. The discoveries led to more expeditions in 1959, 1965, and 1972.

The area was gazetted as "National Historic Monument" in 1958. On 23 November 1974, the area was gazetted as a national park. The national park was opened to the public on 1 January 1975.

In 1960, Don Brothwell concluded that the Deep Skull belonged to an adolescent male who may be closely related to an indigenous Australian from Tasmania. In the 1960s, 122 human remains from Niah were brought to Nevada, United States. There is a lack of paleogeography, stratigraphy, and archeological relationships to support Tom Harrisson's work. Therefore, more fieldwork was conducted by University of Leicester, in collaboration with other universities from Britain, Australia, United States and Sarawak State Museum from 2000 to 2003 to establish a more detailed history of the Niah Caves. It was known as the "Niah Cave Project". Another dating of the charcoal and the Deep Skull itself was done in 2000. It showed the age of the skeleton to be 37,000 years old. In 2006, studies from the Niah Cave Project found out that the ancient humans living in the Niah Caves probably used mammal and fish trapping technologies, projectile technology, tuber digging, plant detoxification, and forest burning. In 2013 to 2014, uranium–thorium dating also confirmed the age of the skull. In 2016, further research done by Darren Curnoe noted that the Deep Skull was more resembling of a female adolescent and is more closely resembling the indigenous people of Borneo rather than Tasmanians or the two layer hypothesis which stated that original population of Southeast Asia were emigrated from Australia and later integrated with people from China.

In 2010 and 2021, the Sarawak state government nominated the park for a UNESCO's World Heritage Site title. In 2020, all 122 pieces of Niah human remains were returned to Sarawak. Niah National Park was included in the UNESCO's World Heritage Site list on 27 July 2024.

== Geography ==
The Niah Caves is located on the northern edge of a limestone mountain named Gunung Subis (Mount Subis). The entrance is located at the west mouth of the cave. The location is 15 km from the South China Sea and 50 m above sea level. The west mouth of the Niah Caves is 150 m wide and 75 m high.

== Archaeology ==
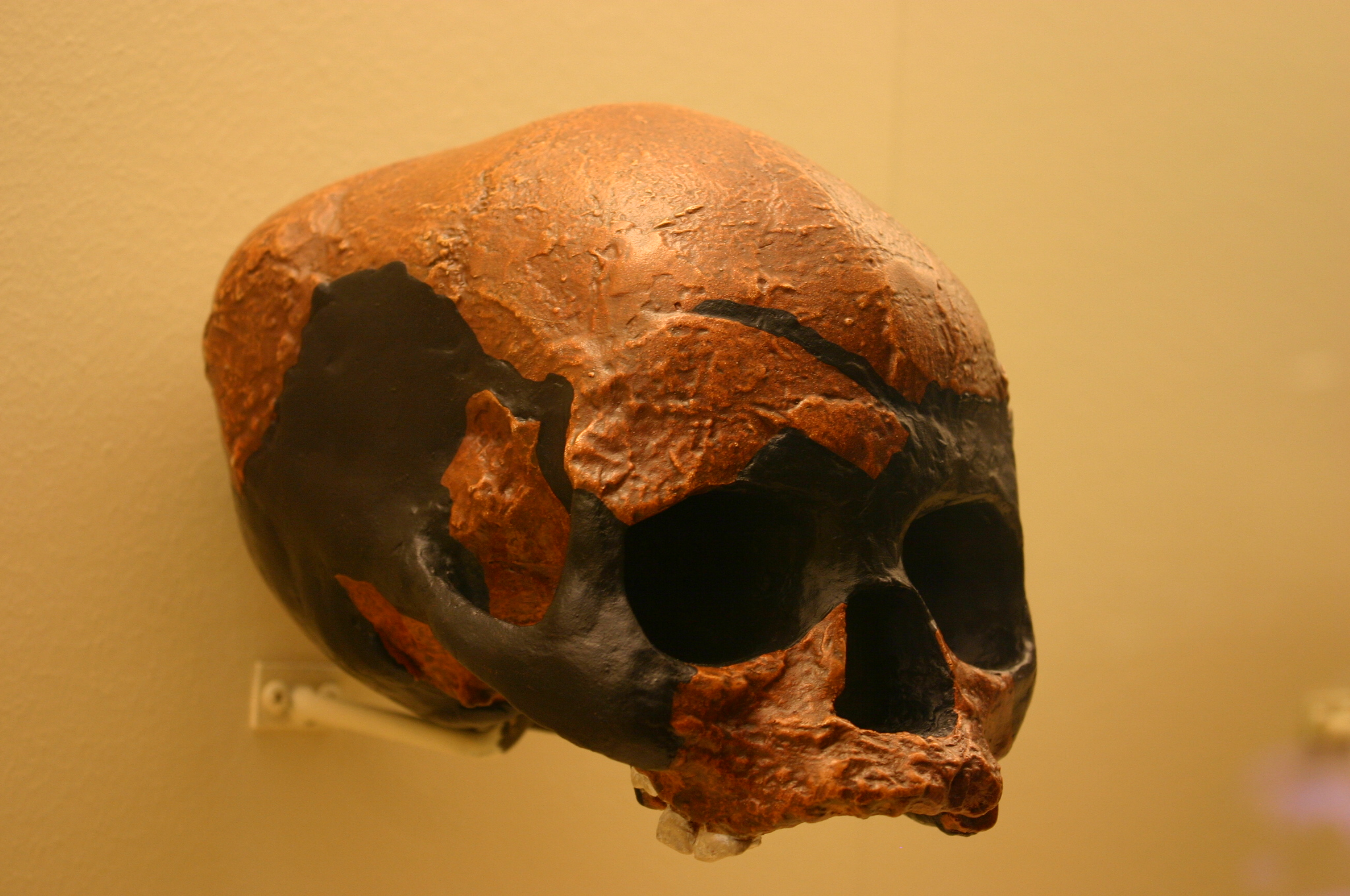
Niah Cave skull. Homo sapiens, 45,000 to 39,000 years old.

The cave is an important prehistorical site where human remains from 40,000 years ago have been found. This is the oldest recorded human settlement in East Malaysia. More recent studies published in 2006 have shown evidence of the first human activity at the Niah caves from ca. 46,000 to 34,000 years ago. Painted Cave, situated in a much smaller limestone block of its own, some 150 metres from the Great Cave block's south eastern tip, has rock paintings dated as 1,200 years old. Archeologists have claimed a much earlier date for stone tools found in the Mansuli valley, near Lahad Datu in Sabah, but a precise dating analysis has yet to be published.

Niah man and contemporary cultures c. 50,000~32,000

Items found at the Niah Cave include Pleistocene chopping tools and flakes, Neolithic axes, adzes, pottery, shell jewellery, boats, mats, then iron tools, ceramics and glass beads dating to the Iron Age. The most famous find is the human skull dated at around 38,000 years BCE. Painted Cave has paintings and wooden coffin 'death ships'.

Between 1954 and 1966, approximately 750,000 fragments of animal bones were excavated here. One of them was identified as a metacarpal bone of a young tiger.

== Vegetation ==
Pearce (2004) recognises six vegetation types:

- Limestone vegetation on karst.
- Mixed Dipterocarp Forest.
- Seasonal Swamp Forest on clayey marl soils.
- Seasonal Swamp Forest on peat soils.
- Riparian Forest.
- Regenerating Forest.

== Insect life ==
The Great Cave is home to three species of cockroach which feed on the guano; one of these, Symploce strinatii, is endemic to the cave. The park as a whole is known to be home to 25 species of phasmids, 25 species of cockroach and 11 species of praying mantids.

== Current activities ==
The caves are also well known for the bird's nest industry. They are a popular tourist destination in Sarawak. Every section of the ceiling in the caves where there are swiftlets roosting is privately owned and only the owner has the right to collect the nests. Collection is done twice a year (usually in January and in June). The collector climbs up hundreds of feet on a single pole to the cave ceiling and scrapes off the nest in flickering candlelight.

== Gallery ==
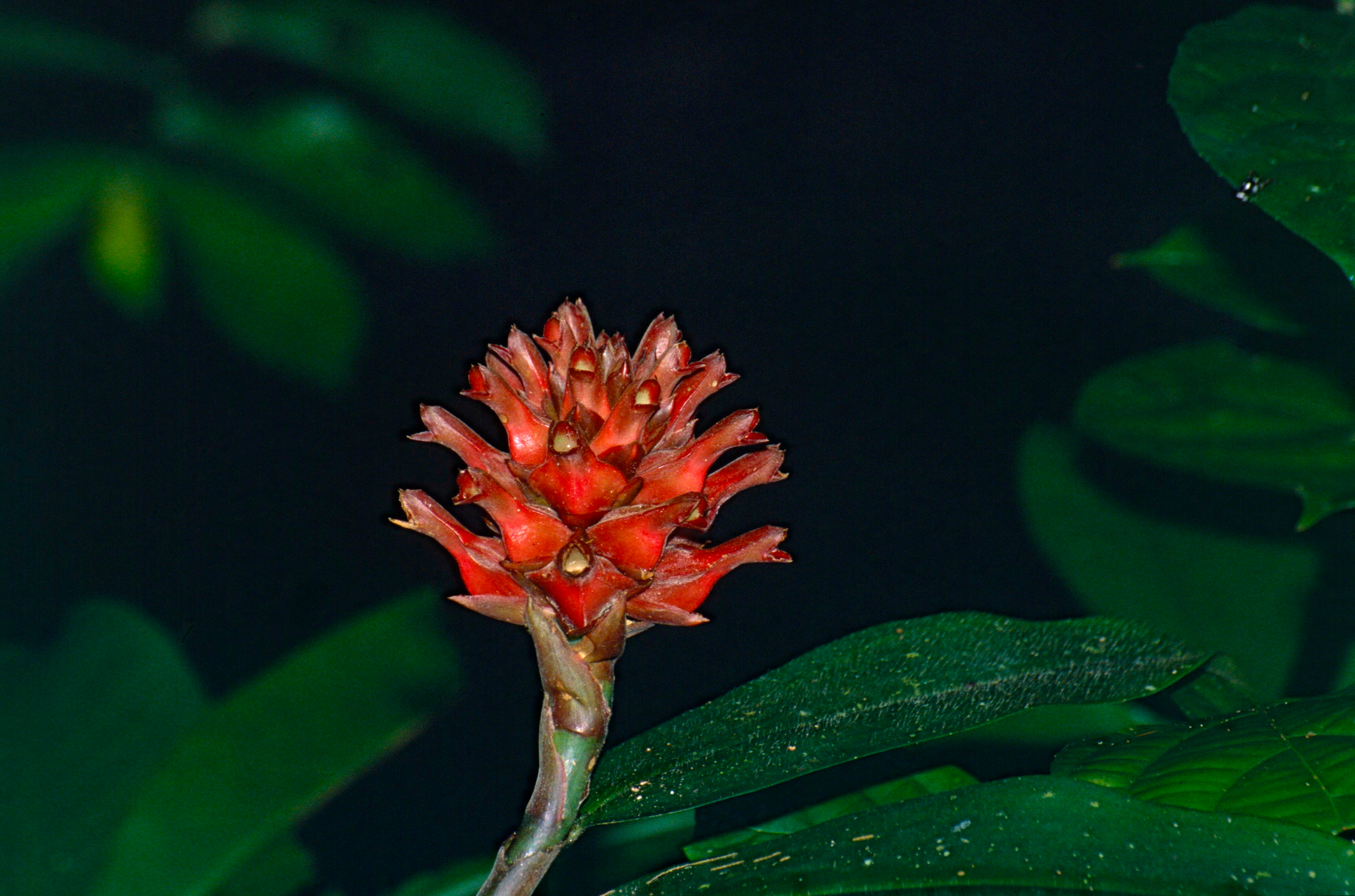
Cane Reed

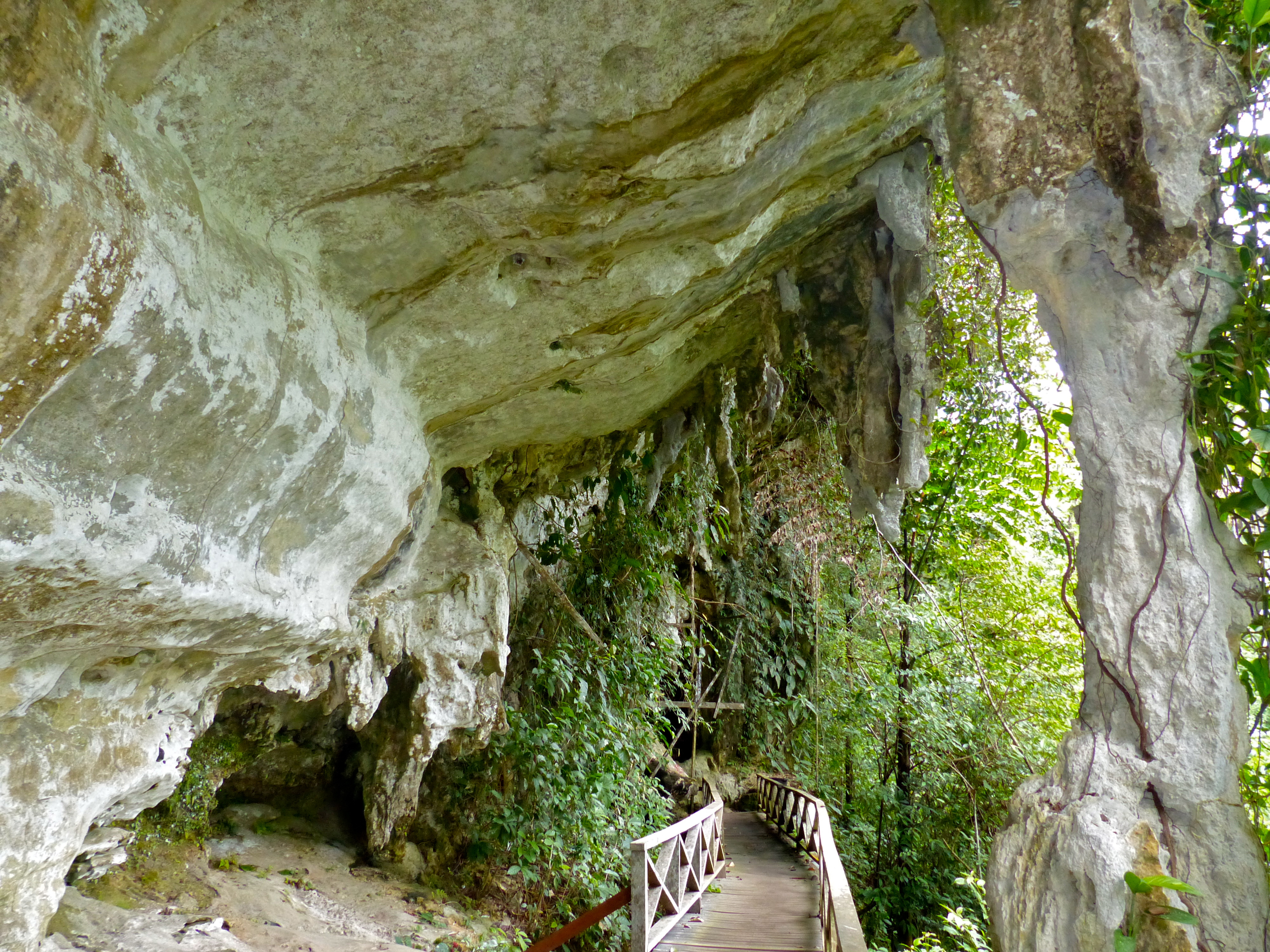
Traders' Cave

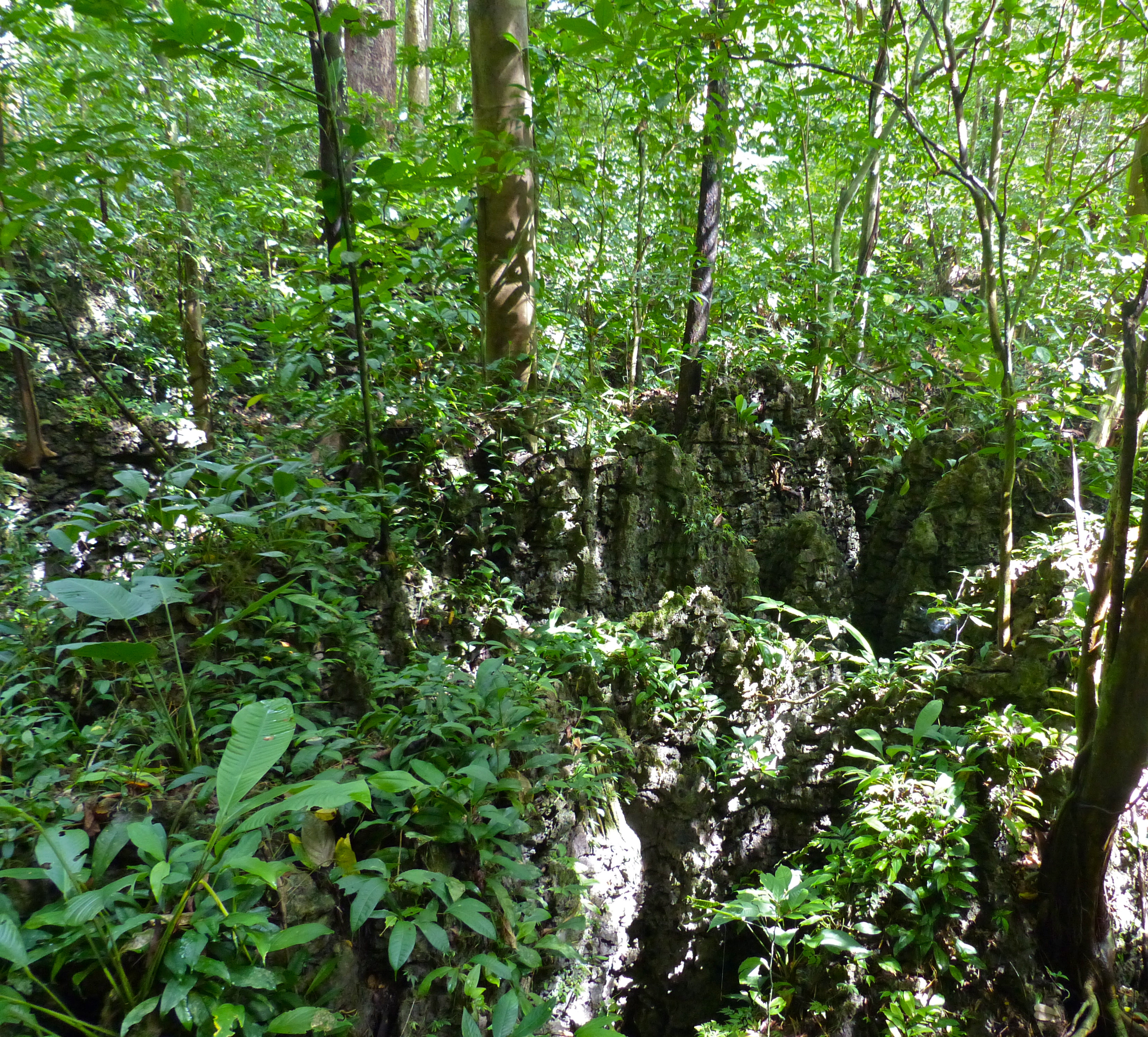
Forest on limestone formations

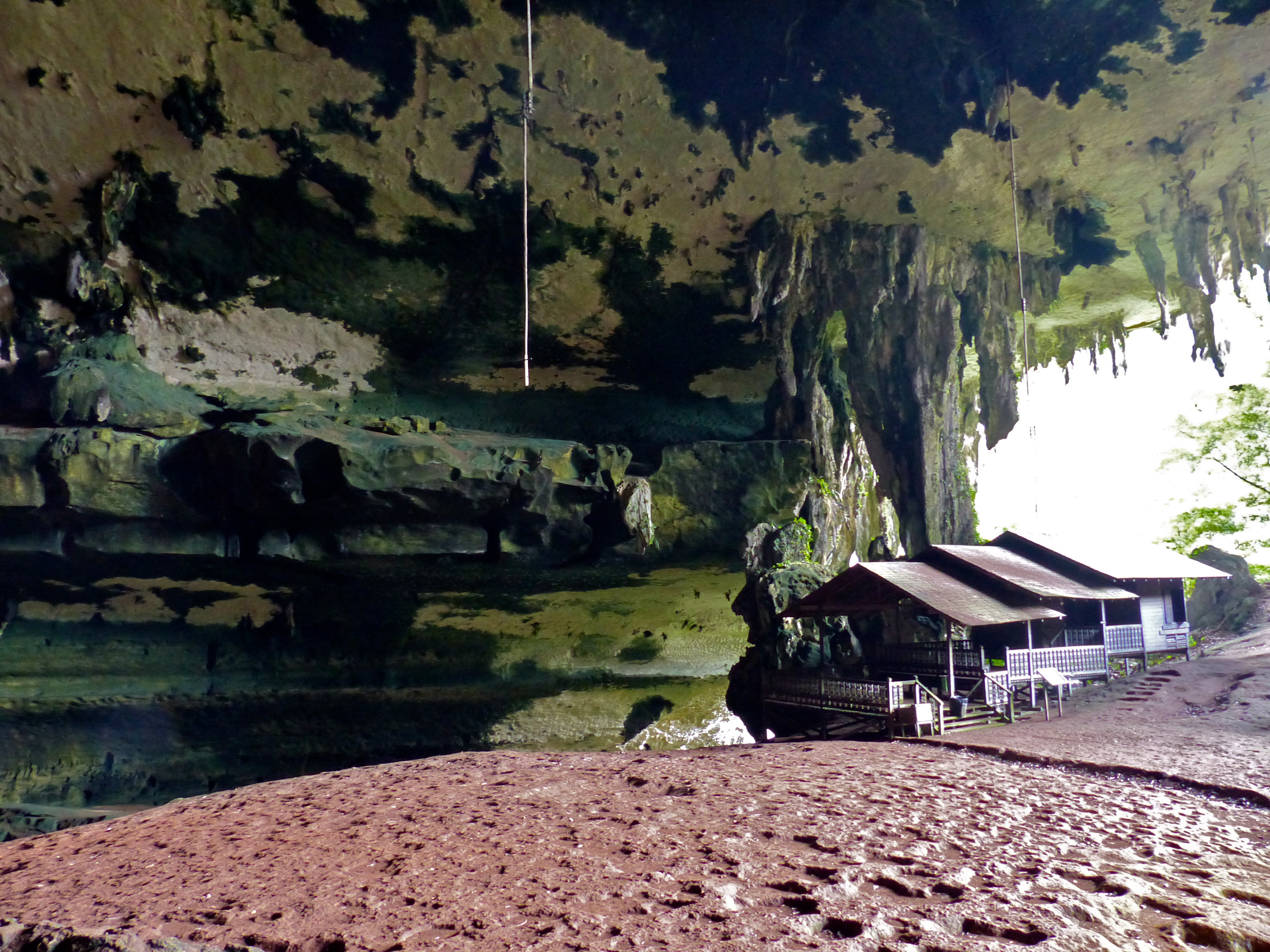
The Great Cave

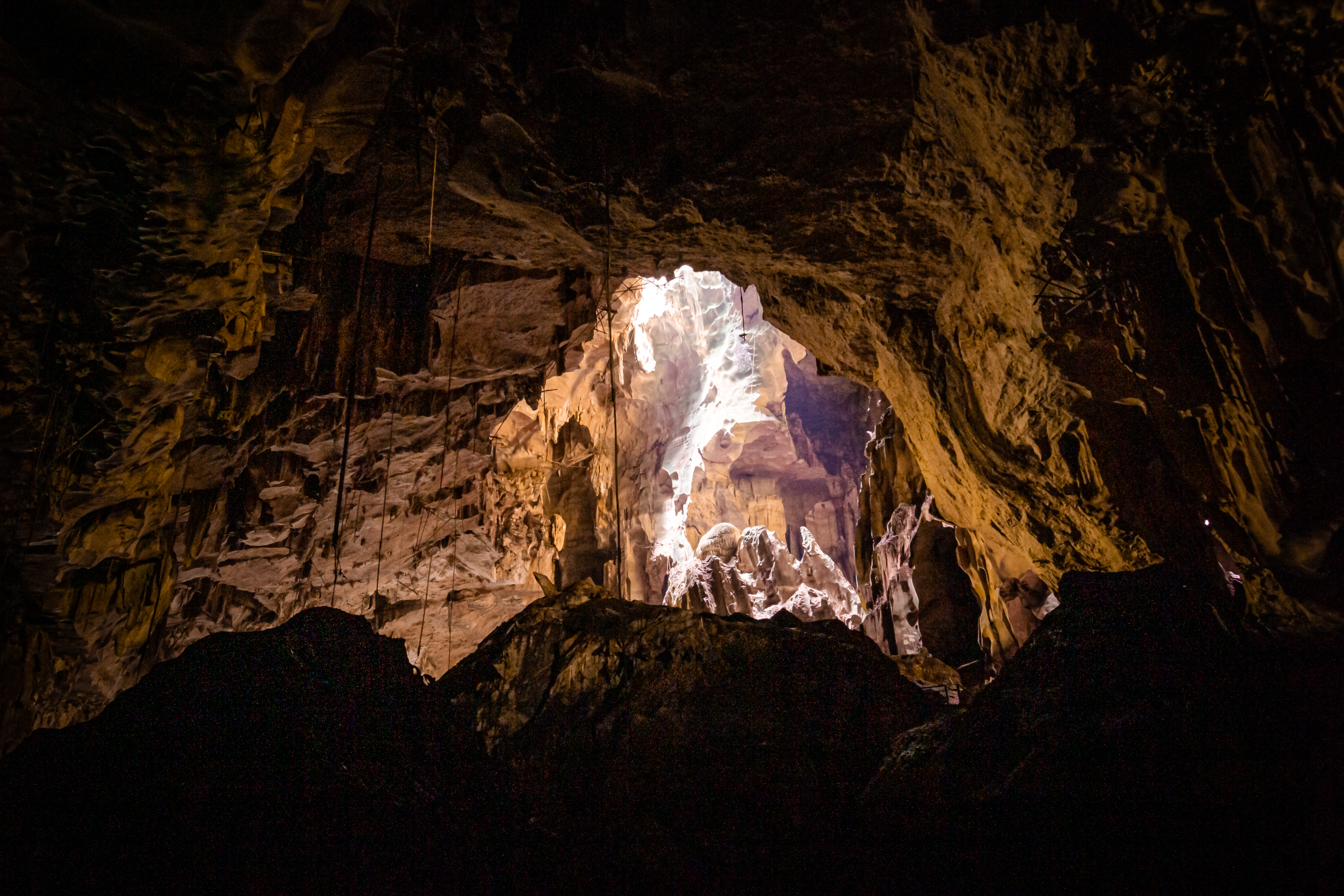
Inside of Niah Cave/The Painted Cave

== See also ==
- Prehistoric Malaysia
