= One Day in History =

UK heritage initiative

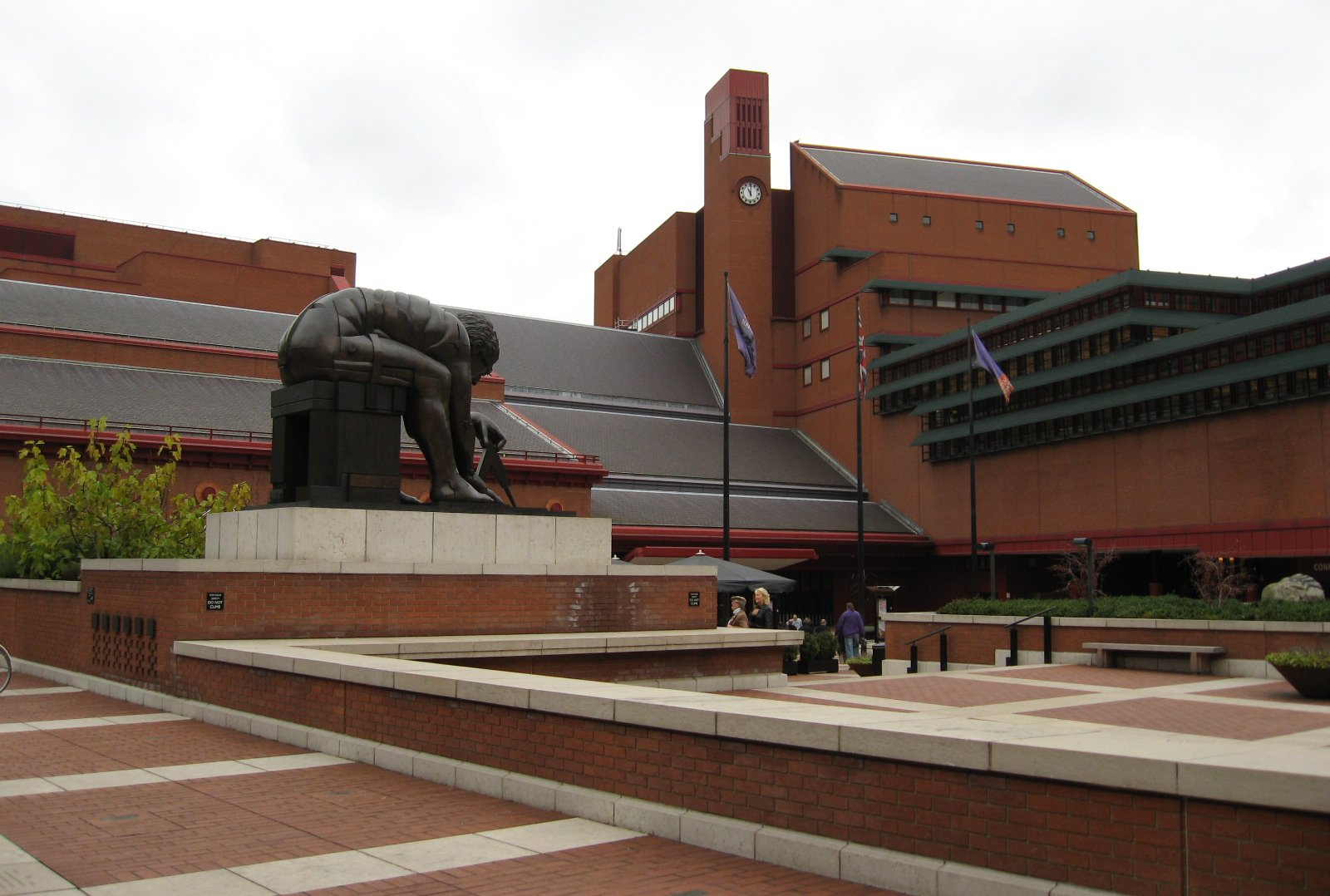
The British Library holds the 46,000 diary entries received as a result of the One Day in History project.

One Day in History was a single-day initiative by several UK heritage organisations that aimed to provide a historical record of the everyday life of the British public in the early 21st century. Described as the "world's biggest blog", it encouraged UK citizens to write diary entries of 100–650 words of what they had done on 17 October 2006, and then upload them to the official website of the initiative. The project formed a part of History Matters: Pass It On, a history campaign led by several UK heritage organisations. Submissions were received until 1 November, and 46,000 entries were uploaded in this time, many of which were from students and celebrities. After being available to view on the History Matters website, the archive of the diary entries was moved to the UK Web Archive at the British Library and the library of the University of Sussex. The campaign received mixed reviews, with Institute of Historical Research's David Cannadine and The Guardian's Dave Hill speaking positively of it, whereas journalist John Plunkett termed it to be a "historical record of people with computers".

== Project ==
One Day in History was launched as a part of History Matters, a campaign led by several heritage organisations such as the National Trust, English Heritage and the Historic Houses Association, in order to draw attention towards the importance of history in everyday life. Its aim was to record for posterity what day-to-day life was like in the UK during 2006. British people were invited to write a blog of what they did on 17 October 2006, and to submit it to become a part of a large online diary. The project was open to all UK citizens and individuals of British origin, and was inspired by Mass Observation, a similar social research project founded in 1937. The date was chosen to be 17 October by History Matters in the hope that it would be "an ordinary day much like any other of no particular national significance", and would therefore reflect the everyday life of its participants. Historian Dan Snow explained that the project was intended to be "a detailed account of people's normal lives when they're doing nothing out of the ordinary. ... It's those mundane details, those boring details that will seem extraordinary to people hundreds of years in the future." The organisers hoped that the contributors could also discuss the impact of history or heritage on their lives that day in their submissions.

Each entry was limited to a length of 100–650 words. To allow some time for drafting and proofreading, participants were allowed to upload their diary entries until the end of the month. Schoolchildren were encouraged to take part, with all 29,000 UK schools being invited to participate. On the day itself, the homepages of the 2,000 computers in the easyCafe network were all set to the History Matters website, and several celebrities and public figures also voiced their support of the initiative, including Stephen Fry, Bob Geldof and Tony Robinson.

=== Public response ===
By the afternoon of 17 October, the One Day in History website had received more than 5,000 submissions, at a rate of three per second, and by 1800 BST (1700 GMT) this number grew to 8,000. Within three days, 41,250 blogs were posted to the site, and by 1 November, a final total of 46,000 submissions were received. The entries were briefly displayed on the History Matters website, before being archived in both the UK Web Archive at the British Library and in the library of the University of Sussex. The National Trust described the project and its response from the public as "hugely successful".

=== Media response ===
David Cannadine of the Institute of Historical Research spoke positively of One Day in History, remarking: "The wonderful thing about these records is we don't yet know what it is about them that will be interesting in the future." In promotion of the project, Fiona Reynolds, the Director-General of the National Trust, stated: "We want this day to have its own place in history and be a snapshot of everyday life at the beginning of the 21st century." Journalist John Plunkett expressed scepticism of this aim, writing in The Guardian that, despite the intentions of the campaign, it was only going to be "a historical record of people with computers". He was also critical of History Matters in general, saying that he had "no idea how history [was] going to impact on [him]". Dave Hill, also writing for The Guardian, described the campaign as a "brilliant idea". Following the publication of the diary entries, Robert Booth, a journalist for The Sunday Times, remarked that the "monotony of most of [the British public's] lives was all too painfully obvious."
