= Farewell to the King =

1989 film by John Milius

- Theatrical release poster
- Directed by: John Milius
- Screenplay by: John Milius
- Based on: Farewell to the King by Pierre Schoendoerffer
- Produced by: Andre Morgan; Albert Ruddy
- Starring: Nick Nolte; Nigel Havers; Marius Weyers; Frank McRae; Elan Oberon; Marilyn Tokuda
- Cinematography: Dean Semler
- Edited by: Anne V. Coates; Carroll Timothy O'Meara
- Music by: Basil Poledouris
- Production company: Ruddy Morgan Productions
- Distributed by: Orion Pictures (United States); Vestron International Group (International)
- Release date: March 3, 1989 (U.S.)
- Running time: 115 minutes
- Country: United States
- Language: English
- Budget: $16 million
- Box office: $2,420,917

Farewell to the King is a 1989 American action adventure drama film written and directed by John Milius. It stars Nick Nolte, Nigel Havers, Frank McRae, and Gerry Lopez and is loosely based on the 1969 novel Farewell to the King by Pierre Schoendoerffer. Longtime Milius collaborator Basil Poledouris composed the musical score.

== Plot ==
During World War II, American deserter Learoyd's lifeboat washes ashore on Borneo, where he escapes the Japanese firing squad that executes his fellow survivors. Staggering through the jungle and hallucinating, he is found by a head-hunting tribe of Dayaks, who adopt him and consider him divine because of his blue eyes. Three years later Learoyd is the reigning king of the Dayaks, has taken a local bride, and is trying to keep his people out of the war.

British commandos led by Captain Fairbourne parachute into the jungle to enlist Learoyd and his tribesmen in the war against the Japanese, but Learoyd wants nothing to do with them. He means to protect a hidden valley at the heart of the island, cut off from the outside world, from both the Japanese and the Allies, and shows it to a visiting British officer. Wounded, Fairbourne returns to the British lines and reports on Learoyd, and his superiors send him back with a larger team to persuade Learoyd to rally the tribe against the Japanese. Fairbourne gradually comes to accept Learoyd as the tribe's rightful king. When his own tribe is threatened by the invaders, Learoyd decides to fight for their rights and to protect their independence, leading them through a series of battles before declaring, "From this day forward, I will raise my hand against no man."

== Cast ==
- Nick Nolte as Learoyd
- Nigel Havers as Captain Fairbourne
- James Fox as Colonel Ferguson
- Marilyn Tokuda as Yoo
- Frank McRae as Sergeant Tenga
- Aki Aleong as Colonel Mitamura
- Marius Weyers as Sergeant Conklin
- William Wise as Dynamite Dave
- Gerry Lopez as Gwai
- Elan Oberon as Vivienne
- Choy Chang Wing as Lian
- Richard Morgan as Stretch Lewis
- John Bennett Perry as General Douglas MacArthur
- Michael Nissman as General Sutherland
- Wayne Pygram as Bren Armstrong

== Production ==
=== Original novel ===
Pierre Schoendoerffer originally wrote the story as a film script. He then turned it into a novel, which was published in 1969 and became a best seller in France, selling over 300,000 copies in hardback. He made the lead character Irish because "the Irish are mad and I like mad people."

"I was wanting to make a great symphonic book on life and death: on how a man can struggle until the very end, without hope and without reason, just to be alive, even though half dead., even though suffering terribly, because life is so powerful. But on the other hand I was wanting to show that if suddenly a man discovers that he is not fulfilling his dream, then he does not want to live anymore."

The story had some basis in historical fact. Tom Harrisson's stay with the Dayaks during the Second World War was the inspiration for much of what happened in the novel along with the allied drop behind Japanese lines known as Operation Semut.

=== Development ===
The film was originally going to be made in 1972, directed by Schoendoerffer and produced by Robert Dorfman, starring Donald Sutherland. However, it was not made. John Milius was interested in the themes of the book. In 1976, he said:

My greatest fantasy is to go off to some foreign land and become a legend of some sort, like The Man Who Would Be King or Heart of Darkness. One of my favorite movies is Return to Paradise, Mark Robson's film with Gary Cooper. That film is my ultimate fantasy. Judge Roy Bean is very similar to it: the idea of a man going off to a primitive culture and becoming a legend and a god. As they say in Citizen Kane, "Lording it over the monkeys."

"I liked the story because it was such a wonderful Kiplingesque adventure tale," Milius later said. "It was a theme I always respond to, a guy living free in the wild, and the world catching up to him. In many ways it's similar to Jeremiah Johnson. I thought if I kept plugging away at it, sooner or later I'd get to do it."

Milius announced he would make the film in 1984. Milius described the film as his "most ambitious work - something I've wanted to do for 15 years... It's a story that explores loyalties, concepts of freedom and justice. And contrasts a seemingly violent but also very innocent society with the most corrupt society of them all, the outside world.

Milius added, "Learoyd is a character who could have come out of one of those barbershop magazines of the '50s: 'I fought the (Japanese) with the headhunters in Borneo where I was king.' He's sitting on a throne with sloe-eyed beauties all around—a mai tai in one hand, a Thompson submachine gun in the other. There is some sort of primitive appeal in that to all of us. But the studios were never very excited about it. I don't know if they are now."

"You wouldn't call Farewell to the King a right-wing establishment movie, it's certainly not in favor of empire," said Milius. "I think this movie is the most honest depiction of my politics. It's also hopelessly romantic: I'm just a romantic fool."

Nick Nolte was cast in the lead for a fee of $3 million. "Thirty years ago it would have been Robert Mitchum," said Milius. "He was an average, proletarian man, not upper class. Leroyd was a slob in paradise. He was a deserter, troublemaker, a '30s labor organizer, the sort of loveable guy that had great ideals, much more than Nigel Havers, [who plays the botanist], who has all the refinement of culture and empire. He looks at this guy and realizes that he is a great man."

"I would say it's a film about loyalty and trust, freedom and justice," said Nolte. "And it compares a savage but innocent society to the outside world which is the most corrupt society of all."

"I'm a story teller," said Milius. "I'm a modern technology version of the Borneo tribal storyteller who squats near the fire in the long house and tells his tale. We're all telling the same tale. It's about the struggle of people to survive and, more important, to be free. It's about the necessity of making moral choices - and their costs. But it seems more real when you see where it really happened - and the people it really happened to. It's set in the 1940s and many people lost their freedom in the 1940s and were taking action and having adventures to get it back. Human beings like to hear stories about how they've survived and stayed free."

Anne Coates, the editor, called it "a terrific script. And everybody said, whatever you do, do not work with John Milius, you will hate him. He’s not your kind of person, and he’s a bully and he’s a this and that and the other, and you won’t really get on with him. But it was a three months location in Borneo, and so, rather stupidly, I went for a meeting with John Milius, and he was very charming to me, but, I didn’t like him. And he ran down everybody that I admired and liked... But he was being his sort of, most charming to me and everything. And so I thought, oh well, maybe it’ll be all right."

=== Filming ===
Filming started August 24, 1987. The film was shot on location in Borneo (Bau District, Sarawak, Malaysia). Nolte arrived in Borneo a month before filming began. "We could have shot this film in the Philippines for a lot less money", he says. "But this is where it happened. These are the real people. These are real Iban."

"This is a tough film, but you kind of like the toughness of it here", said Milius on location. "This is an adventure. If you're a romantic like me, you think of yourself out building the Panama Canal, or being the Rajah Brooke. You can't think of that if you're in a rainstorm in the San Fernando Valley."

Milius' then-girlfriend played Nigel Haver's fiancée.

Coates went on location to edit the movie. She said Milius had "no consideration for people at all. And he was a boorish, vulgar, crude, rude man, and not a very good director. Very good writer. But not a very good director. All he thought about was food and his girlfriend." She recalled Milius would fall asleep in the jungle while directing and "he didn’t control Nick Nolte at all, who was a very good actor but he does need some help from the director."

She also said Milius "likes people who say how marvellous he is all the time... He was always saying, ‘Oh isn’t that like a David Lean shot.’... And one day I said to him, ‘How about having a John Milius shot today for a change?’ you know, and that didn’t go down very well." She claimed "we could never find him the night before to find out if he wanted to work on the Sunday or not, because he was going round all the clubs trying to find his girlfriend who was standing him up with one of the extras or something, and, you know, it was all very nasty."

=== Editing ===
Post-production was to be done in England but the falling US dollar meant that it was done in Los Angeles. Anne Cotes, who had done an initial rough cut, left the project during this stage.

According to Milius, the film was his best movie but it was "completely cut to pieces" by executives at the studio. In February 1989 he said, "Orion isn't behind it. They don't think it is going to be big at the box office. You put all the sweat and blood you can into it, and the outcome is whatever happens."

Milius would have liked to have been able to exceed the two-hour running time limit by 10 minutes, and preferred his silent action sequences accompanied by Basil Poledouris music over the release print's realistic, percussive sound effects. "The music was played down," he said. "It was a beautiful score. The producers' attitude is: `We paid for the gunshot, let's hear it.'" He was also unhappy the edit removed how Learoyd managed to unify the Dyak tribes by getting the women to hold a sex strike. He later said

[The film] was thrown away. I, as usual, was attacked viciously but in time it's come to be regarded as one of my best. In a way - I don't know why - I guess this film is more heartfelt than anything I've done since Big Wednesday... The producers - Al Ruddy and Andre Morgan - who are friends of mine now - were lied to by Orion executives. They did a very careful divide-and-conquer and turned us against each other. They [Ruddy and Morgan] would love to recut it the way I wanted... We'd all love to recut that movie and rerelease it.

According to Anne Coates, "they changed the story, because it was Nigel’s story. It was a botanist’s story, and then they changed it to Nick’s story... when it was the botanist’s story, it was much better."

Mike Medavoy, Milius' former agent who was head of Orion Pictures at the time, wrote in 2002 that:

Many things stopped Farewell to the King from being successful. There were endless arguments between Al and John, and between John and us over the cutting of the film. John ended up being mad at me for years, but we've become close friends again. In the end, the film just didn't play. Perhaps audiences weren't ready to see a white soldier become the king of an indigenous tribe in Borneo. It was one of a group of daring Orion movies that didn't make money but, in retrospect, is a movie we are all very proud to have been a part of.

== Reception ==
Review aggregation website Rotten Tomatoes retrospectively collected reviews from 11 critics and gave the film a score of 55%, with an average rating of 5.5 out of 10.

Roger Ebert gave the film 3/4 stars. Ebert praised Nolte for his skill as an actor, and his ability to inhabit a role rather than merely visit.

Milius later said he felt he had made a "great film".

== DVD ==
Farewell to the King was released to DVD by MGM Home Entertainment on June 6, 2006.
