= Mass-Observation =

United Kingdom social research organisation

Mass-Observation is a United Kingdom social research project. It was originally the name of an organisation which ran from 1937 to the mid-1960s, and was revived in 1981 at the University of Sussex.

Mass-Observation originally aimed to record everyday life in Britain through a panel of around 500 untrained volunteer observers who either maintained diaries or replied to open-ended questionnaires (known as directives). The organisation also paid investigators to anonymously record people's conversation and behaviour at work, on the street and at various public occasions, including public meetings and sporting and religious events.

== Origins ==
Cover of a book by Mass-Observation, showing King George VI, radio news reporter Richard Dimbleby and flag-waving crowds

The creators of the Mass-Observation project were three former students from Cambridge: anthropologist Tom Harrisson (who left Cambridge before graduating), poet Charles Madge and filmmaker Humphrey Jennings. Collaborators included literary critic William Empson, photographers Humphrey Spender and Michael Wickham, collagist Julian Trevelyan, novelists Inez Pearn and G.B. Edwards, spiritualist medium Rosemary Brown, journalist Anne Symonds, and painters William Coldstream and Graham Bell. Run on a shoestring budget with money from their own pockets and the occasional philanthropic contribution or book advance, the project relied primarily on its network of volunteer correspondents.

Harrisson had set up his base in a working-class street in the northern English industrial town of Bolton (known in Mass-Observation publications as "Worktown"), in order to "systematically... record human activity in this industrial town" (Madge & Harrisson, 1938:7) using a variety of observational methods. Meanwhile, Madge, from his London home, had started to form a group of fellow-poets, artists and film-makers under the name "Mass-Observation". The two teams began their collaboration in early 1937.

An important early focus was King Edward VIII's abdication in 1936 to marry divorcée Wallis Simpson, and the succession of George VI. Dissatisfied with the pronouncements of the newspapers as to the public mood, the project's founders initiated a nationwide effort to document the feelings of the populace about important current events by collecting anecdotes, overheard comments, and "man-in-the-street" interviews on and around the coronation of King George VI and Queen Elizabeth on 12 May 1937.

Their first published report, May the Twelfth: Mass-Observation Day-Surveys 1937 by over two hundred observers was published in book form. The result tended to subvert the Government's efforts at image-making. The principal editors were Humphrey Jennings and Charles Madge, with the help of T. O. Beachcroft, Julian Blackburn, William Empson, Stuart Legg and Kathleen Raine. The 1987 reprint contains an afterword by David Pocock, director of the Tom Harrisson Mass-Observation archive.

In August 1939, Mass-Observation invited members of the public to record and send them a day-to-day account of their lives in the form of a diary. No special instructions were given to these diarists so they vary greatly in their style, content and length. 480 people responded to this invitation and their diaries are now held in the organisation's archive.

== Impact ==
During the Second World War, Mass-Observation research was occasionally influential in shaping British public policy. In 1939 Mass-Observation publicly criticised the Ministry of Information's posters, which led to their being replaced with more appropriate ones. In addition, their study of saving habits was successfully used by John Maynard Keynes to argue for tax policy changes. During the war, there were also a few cases of Mass-Observation (MO) doing research on commission for government authorities trying to shape recruiting and war propaganda: Mary Adams, for example, employed Mass-Observation on commission for the Ministry of Information.

== Decline and end ==
Following the war, and the departure of project founders Harrisson, Madge, and Jennings, research began to focus on the commercial habits of the country rather than the broader cultural research that characterised its first decade. This turn towards market research was formalised in 1949 when the project was incorporated as a private firm and, under new management, became registered as a market research limited company, Mass Observation (UK) Limited. Eventually the firm was merged with the advertising agency J. Walter Thompson's UK research agency BMRB, to form MRB International, followed by a full merger in the early 1990s.

== Relaunch: The Mass Observation Project (1981–present) ==
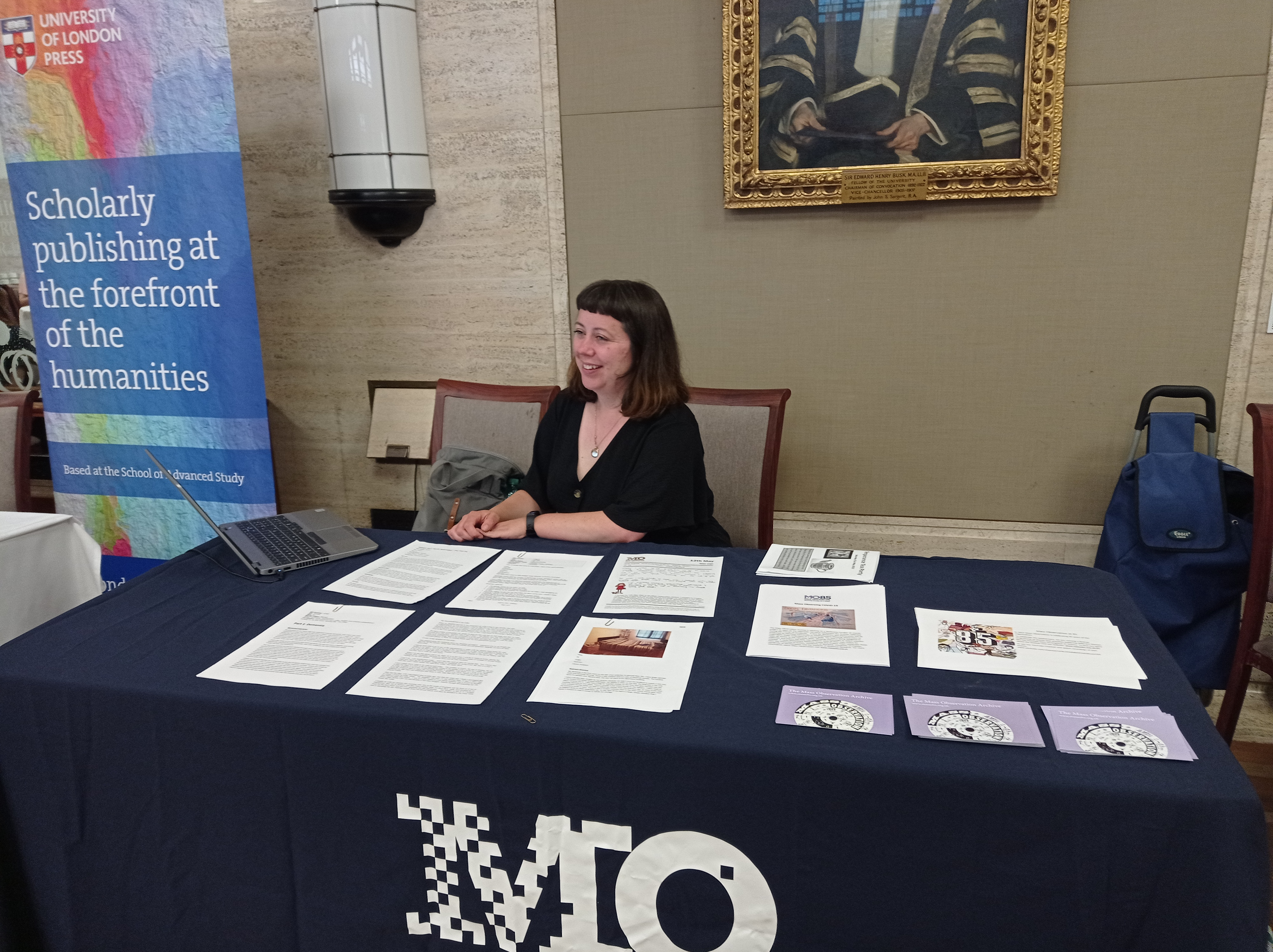
The relaunched Mass-Observation at History Past, Present Future, the IHR Centenary Festival, July 2022

A re-evaluation of the Mass-Observation archives led to a relaunch of the project in 1981. Today, housed at the University of Sussex, Mass-Observation continues to collect the thoughts of its panel of writers through regular questionnaires (known as directives) and is used by students, academics, media researchers and the public for its unique collection of material on everyday life in Britain. The project issues annual call-outs for day diaries on the 12th of May each year, echoing the initial call on 12th May 1937; anyone is welcome to submit a diary of their activity on this day either digitally or physically.

The Mass-Observation archive of materials is currently housed in The Keep, an archive housing East Sussex and Brighton and Hove councils' historical record.

== Publications ==
- Mass-Observation (Charles Madge & Tom Harrisson), Mass-Observation (pamphlet), London, Frederick Muller, 1937.
- Charles Madge & Humphrey Jennings, eds. May the Twelfth, Mass-Observation Day-Surveys 1937, by over two hundred observers, London, Faber and Faber, 1937. ISBN 0-571-14872-7
- Charles Madge & Tom Harrisson, First Year's Work, London, Lindsay Drummond, 1938.
- Charles Madge & Tom Harrisson, Britain, Harmondsworth, Penguin Books, 1939.
- Mass-Observation, War Begins at Home, London, Chatto & Windus, 1940.
- Mass-Observation, Clothes Rationing, Advertising Service Guild, 1941
- Mass-Observation, Home Propaganda, Advertising Service Guild, 1941
- Mass-Observation, The Pub and the People, London, Gollancz, 1943; reprinted Seven Dials Press, 1971.
- Mass-Observation, War Factory, London, Gollancz, 1943.
- Mass-Observation, People's Homes, London, John Murray/Advertising Service Guild, 1943
- Mass-Observation, The Journey Home, London, John Murray/Advertising Service Guild, 1944
- Mass-Observation, Britain and her Birth Rate, London, John Murray/Advertising Service Guild, 1945
- Mass-Observation, Peace and the Public - A Study, London, Longmans, Green, 1947
- Mass-Observation (Herbert Wilcox), Juvenile Delinquency, London, Falcon press, 1949.
- Mass-Observation (with illustrations by Ronald Searle), Meet Yourself at the Doctors, London, Naldrett Press, 1949
- Mass-Observation (with illustrations by Ronald Searle), Meet Yourself on Sunday, London, Naldrett Press, 1949
- Tom Harrisson, Britain Revisited, London, Gollancz, 1961.
- Tom Harrisson, Living through the Blitz, London, Collins, 1976.

A number of publications are also available from the University of Sussex. The following selection of titles also gives some idea of the scope of Mass Observation's work:

- Attitudes to AIDS
- Bolton Working Class Life
- Children's Millennium Diaries
- Everyday use of social relaxants and stimulants
- Gender and Nationhood
- Britain in the Falklands War
- Health, sickness and the work ethic, Helen Busby (2000)
- Looking at Europe: pointers to some British attitudes
- Researching women's lives: notes from visits to East Central Europe
- Mass-Observation: des 'capsules' de vie quotidienne
- One Day in the Life of Television, ed. Sean Day-Lewis (1989)
- Sex surveyed, 1949–1994 – The actual Mass-Observation survey was called Little Kinsey; the results were published in a book by Liz Stanley under the above title.
- Pub and the People: A Worktown study ed. Tom Harrisson (1943)
- Weeping in the Cinema in 1950, Sue Harper and Vincent Porter (1995)

Since the archive was moved and re-established at Sussex University, a number of books based on the diaries commissioned by Mass-Observation in 1939 have been published. These include:

- Among You Taking Notes. The Wartime Diary of Naomi Mitchison ed. Dorothy Sheridan. 1985 (Victor Gollancz). 2000 (Phoenix)
- Our Hidden Lives, The Everyday Diaries of Forgotten Britain between 1945–48 ed. Simon Garfield 2005 (Ebury Press)
- Love and War in London. A Woman's Diary 1939–42 by Olivia Cockett, ed. Robert Malcolmson. 2005 (Wilfrid Laurier University Press). 2008 (The History Press)
- We Are At War. The Diaries of Five Ordinary People in Extraordinary Times ed. Simon Garfield 2006 (Ebury press)
- Nella Last's War ed. Richard Broad and Suzie Fleming, 1981 (Falling Wall Press). 2006 (Profile Books)
- Private Battles: How the War Almost Defeated Us ed. Simon Garfield 2007 (Ebury press)
- Nella Last’s Peace, covering the years 1945–8. ed. Patricia and Robert Malcolmson, 2008 (Profile Books)
- Our Longest Days - a People's History of the Second World War, an anthology ed. Sandra Koa Wing 2008 (Profile Books)
- Wartime Women. A Mass Observation Anthology ed. Dorothy Sheridan 1990 (Heinemann). 2009 (Phoenix Press)
- Dorset in Wartime: The Diary of Phyllis Walther 1941-1942 ed. Patricia Malcolmson and Robert Malcolmson 2009 (Dorset Record Society)

See also:

- Hubble, Nick. Mass-Observation and Everyday Life. Houndmills-Basingstoke: Palgrave Macmillan. 2006. ISBN 1-4039-3555-6. A history of the Mass-Observation movement from a former Research Fellow at the Mass-Observation Archive, University of Sussex, UK (from back cover).

Findings of Mass-Observation have also played a large part in such works of social history as Joe Moran's Queuing for Beginners.

== See also ==
- One Day in History – a similar project undertaken in 2006
- Nella Last
- Housewife, 49, a TV movie based on Nella Last's diary.
