= Barbara Harrisson =

German archeologist and museum director

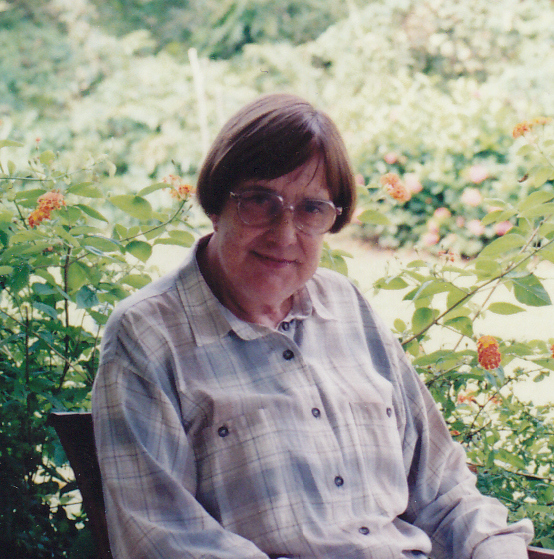
- Harrisson in 1995
- Born: Barbara Güttler; 20 May 1922; Reichenstein, Silesia, now Poland
- Died: 26 December 2015 (aged 93); Jelsum, Netherlands
- Other name: Barbara Harrisson
- Known for: Art history, archaeology, primatology
- Spouse(s): Eberhard Friedrich Brünig (*1926); Tom Harrisson (1911-1976)
- Parent(s): Gerhart Güttler; Clara Güttler, née Haselbach

Barbara Harrisson (born Barbara Veronika Gertrud Maria Elisabeth Güttler, 20 May 1922 – 26 December 2015) was a German-British art historian who also contributed scientifically to nature conservation, primatology, anthropology, and archaeology.

== Education and early employment ==
Barbara was born in Reichenstein, Silesia (now Poland) as the daughter of the mining entrepreneur and art collector Dr. Gerhart Güttler (1889–1966) and his wife Clara (née Haselbach; 1897–1972). In 1926 the family moved from Reichenstein to Berlin. After graduation and Arbeitsdienst, in 1941 she started studies in art history in Berlin, but was drafted for military service after a few weeks and worked during the Second World War as a secretary for the German military intelligence in Berlin, Paris and Breslau. Of her three brothers only the youngest survived the war. From 1945 she worked in Frankfurt for the Agency for Decartelization of IG Farben. In 1951 she married Eberhard Friedrich Brünig (born 1926), who had an education in forestry.

== Career ==
From 1953 on, her professional development underwent a change. During her stays in Asia, America, Australia and finally back in Europe, she worked and taught in the fields of nature conservation, primatology, anthropology, archaeology and art history.

=== Sarawak (Borneo) ===
In 1953, she went with her first husband, Eberhard Friedrich Brünig, who took up a position in the British colonial service and later became an expert in tropical forestry, to Kuching/Sarawak, Borneo. There she started to work for the curator of the Sarawak State Museum, Tom Harrisson, "a romantic polymath, a drunken bully, an original-thinking iconoclast, a dreadful husband and father, [and] a fearless adventurer"; they married in 1956.

==== Animal conservation projects ====
Map of East Malaysia

Tom and Barbara Harrisson worked on a broad spectrum of activities – among them conservation projects for sea turtles and orangutans close to Bako National Park. Barbara Harrisson became a pioneer in raising and rehabilitation of young Orang-Utans, who had lost their mothers and their habitat due to deforestation – activities which later led to the establishment of reserves like the Orang Utan Rehabilitation Center in Sepilok/Sabah (since 1964) and the Gunung Leuser National Park in Sumatra (since 1980).

In 1973, she became an officer of the International Primate Protection League (IPPL) – in 2015 she was still on the advisory board – as her interests extended to regulations for the trade with primates, which – in collaboration with the International Union for Conservation of Nature (IUCN) led to the Convention on International Trade in Endangered Species of Wild Fauna and Flora (CITES) (drafted 1963, opened for signature in 1973, entered into force on 1 July 1975).

==== Archaeological and anthropological research ====
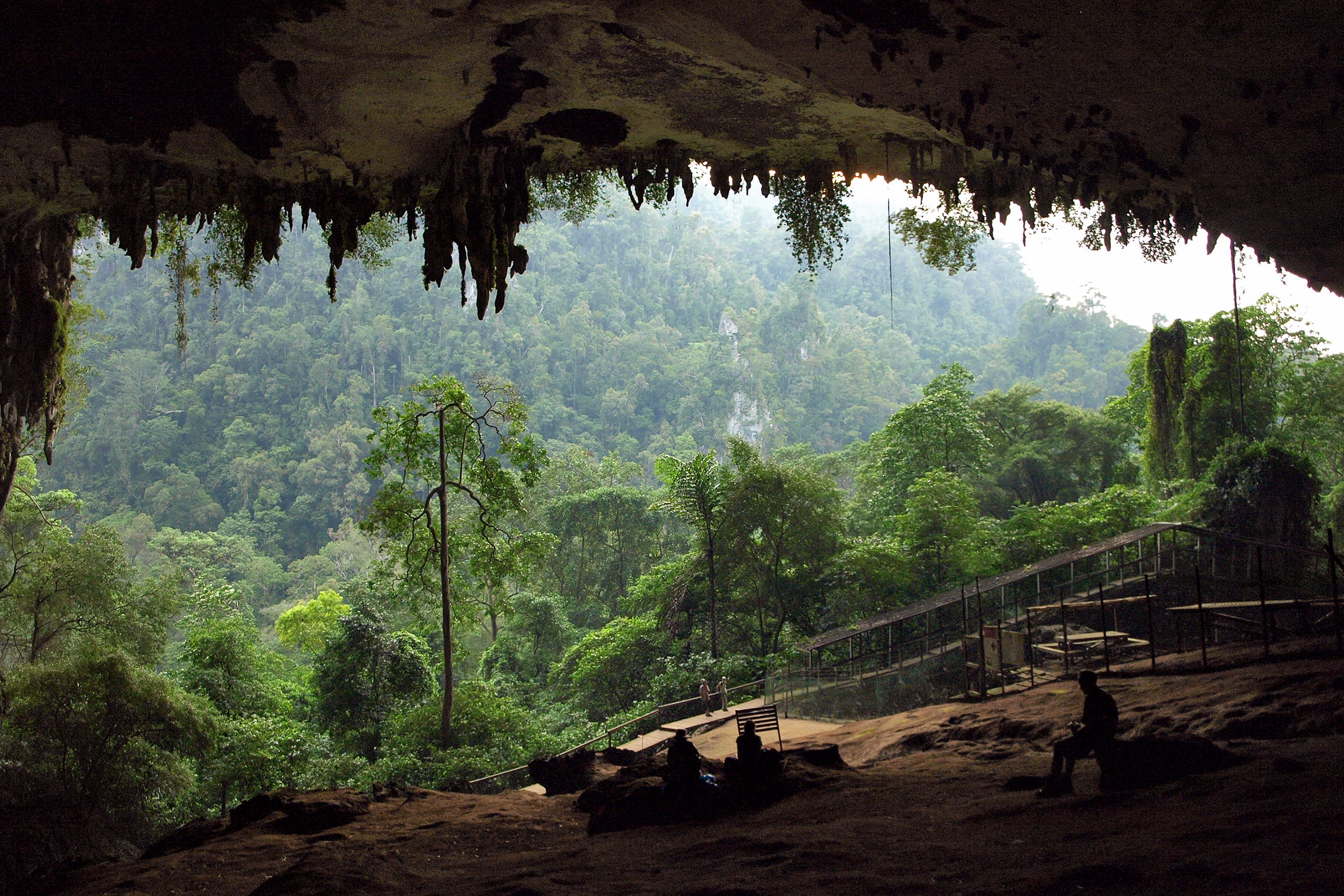
Entrance of the Niah Great Cave

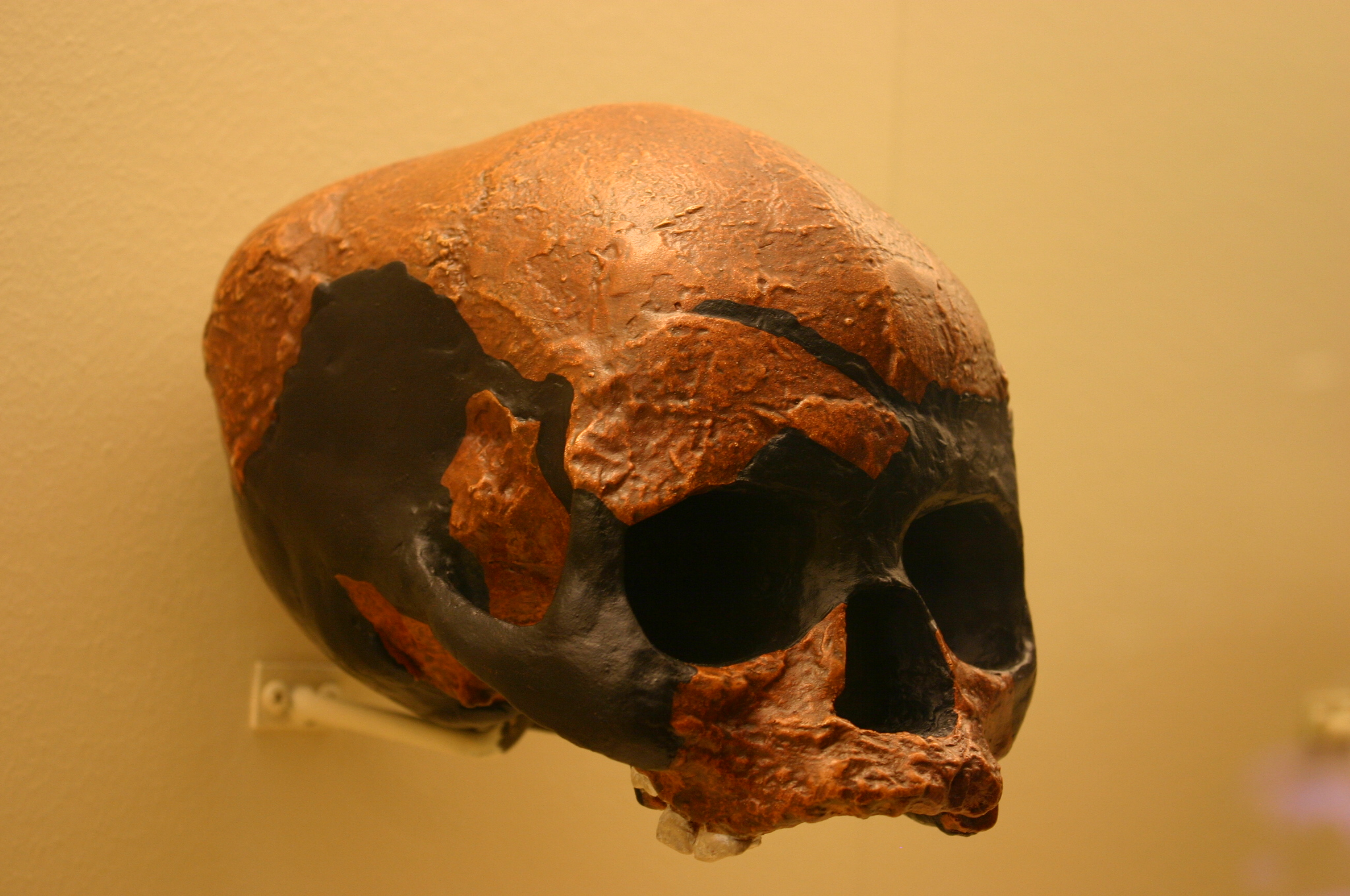
'Deep Skull' (Homo sapiens skull from the Niah Great Cave)

The main interest of Tom and Barbara Harrisson was on archaeology and anthropology. They undertook pioneering excavations in the West Mouth of the Niah Great Cave. Their most important finding was on 7 February 1958, when Barbara Harrisson and colleagues discovered an inverted human skull while carefully digging in Hell Trench H/6, about 2.5 m below original ground surface. The surrounding deposits were initially dated to about 45,000 to 39,000 years by radiocarbon dating, which was received with much scepticism by many scientists. But later excavations and new carbon-dating confirmed the results of Barbara and Tom Harrisson, confirming the 'Deep Skull' still as the earliest fossil proofing the presence of modern humans in Southeast Asia.

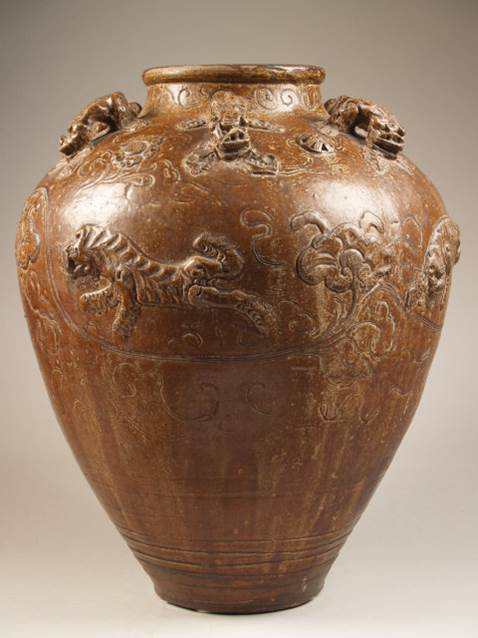
Heirloom jar (Martaban) from Borneo. This jar, a gift, Barbara Harrisson owned since 1960. Today it is part of the Princessehof collection.

Barbara Harrisson – still without any formal education – led excavations in Niah and other places in Borneo, and documented this work in many publications. During this work she became a specialist in ceramics.

=== Ithaca (United States) ===
In November 1966 Tom Harrisson retired as curator of the Sarawak Museum. In 1967, the couple went to Cornell University (Ithaca, USA), where Tom got a teaching assignment at the South-East Asian Program.

When Tom Harrisson left to Europe for a new marriage, Barbara – still without any formal education – took over his seminars at Cornell. 1972 she finally started her own university education as an art historian and obtained her master's degree in 1974. Her time in the USA was interrupted by many stays in Southeast Asia. Her PhD thesis on Heirloom Jars of Borneo under Stanley O'Connor, professor for South-east Asian art history, was started at this time and was finished in 1984.

=== Perth (Australia) ===
In 1976 she joined the Asia Department of the Western Australia Institute of Technology at the University of Perth, Australia, as a lecturer.

=== Leeuwarden (The Netherlands) ===
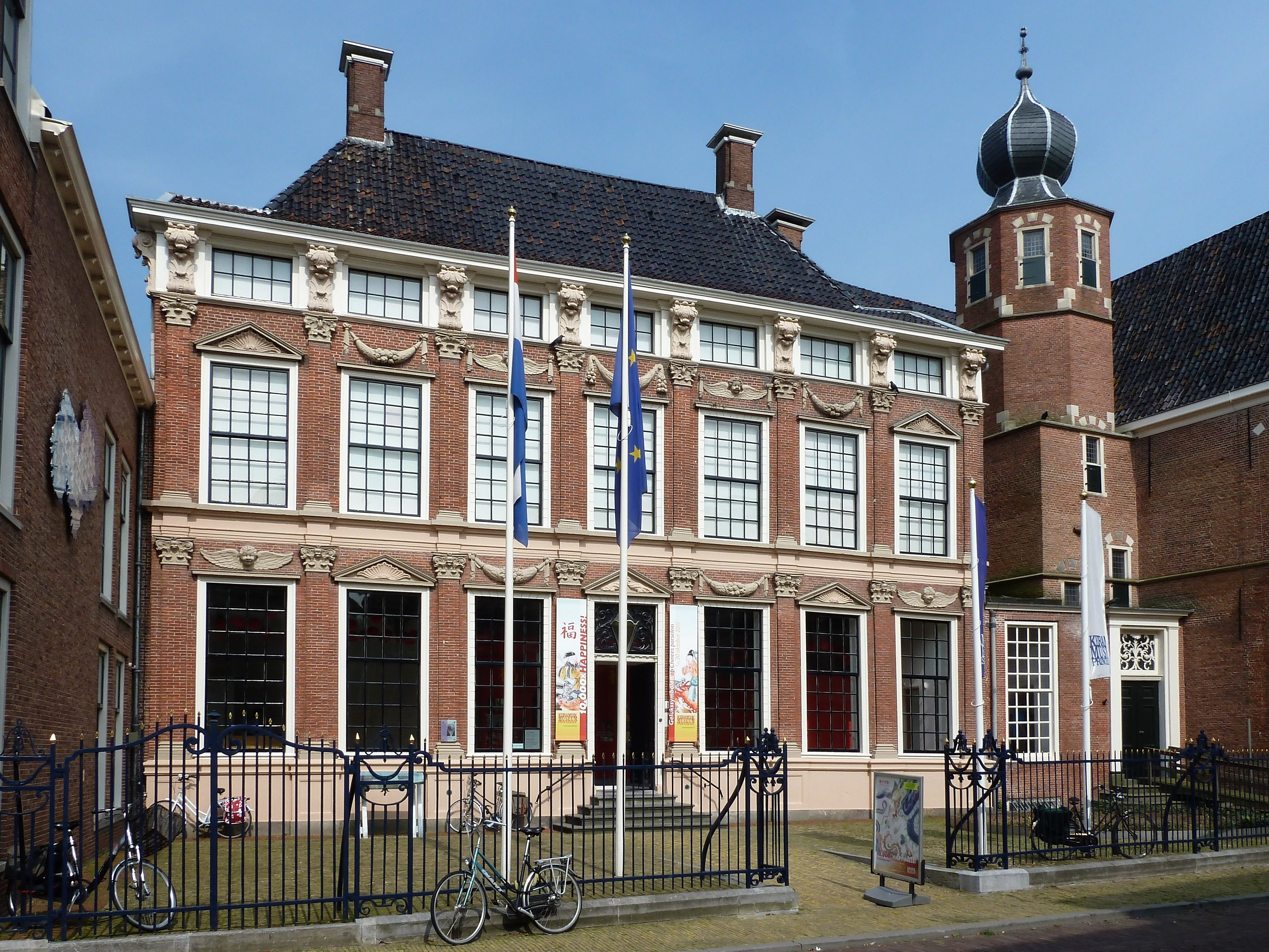
Keramiekmuseum Princessehof in Leeuwarden

In 1977 Barbara Harrisson was appointed director of the Princessehof Ceramics Museum in Leeuwarden, The Netherlands – a significant ceramics museum, which has been put on the international map by her successful work including numerous exhibitions and publications. Her main interest was focused on the collections of Martaban as well as of Zhangzhou ware (formerly "Swatow ware") ceramics.

After retirement in 1987, she continued publishing and attending scientific meetings. In her last years, Barbara Harrisson – almost blind – was engaged in writing her autobiography. She died in Jelsum, Netherlands.

== Awards and honorary degrees ==
- 1973: Honorary doctorate from Tulane University, USA for her activities in nature conservation
- 1972/73: American Motors Conservation Award
- 1975: Lauriston Sharp Prize for scholarly excellence

== Publications ==
The following list of Barbara Harrisson's publications is a selection of books, articles, and descriptions of ceramics collections in museums.

=== Art history ===
- Barbara Harrisson: European Trade Ceramics in the Brunei Museum, The Brunei Museum Journal, vol. 3(1), p. 66-87 (1973).
- Barbara Harrisson: Swatow in the Princessehof, Leeuwarden, Princessehof Museum (1978).
- Barbara Harrisson: Oriental Celadon: The Princessehoff Collection, Leeuwarden, Princessehof Museum (1978).
- Barbara Harrisson: Kraakporselein, Leeuwarden, Princessehof Museum (1981).
- Barbara Harrisson: Asian Ceramics in the Princessehof: An Introduction, Leeuwarden, Princessehof Museum (1986).
- Barbara Harrisson (based on her doctoral thesis): Pusaka: Heirloom Jars of Borneo, Singapore, Oxford University Press (1986), ISBN 978-0195826548.
- Barbara Harrisson: Later Ceramics in South-East Asia: Sixteenth to Twentieth Centuries, Kuala Lumpur, Oxford University Press (1996), ISBN 978-9676531124.
- Barbara Harrisson: Ceramic Trade across the South China Sea, Journal of the Malaysia Branch of the Royal Asiatic Society, vol. 76(1), p. 99-114 (2003).

=== Archaeology and anthropology ===
- Barbara Harrisson: Niah's Lobang Tulang ("Cave of Bones"), Sarawak Museum Journal, vol. VIII,12, p. 596-619 (1958).
- Barbara Harrisson: A Classification of Stone Age Burials from Niah Great Cave, Sarawak, Sarawak Museum Journal, vol. XV,30-31, p. 126-200 (1967).
- Barbara Harrisson: Classification of Archaeological Trade Ceramics from Kota Batu, Brunei Museum Journal, vol. 2(1), p. 114-187 (1970).
- Tom and Barbara Harrisson: The Prehistory of Sabah, Sabah Society Journal 4, Monograph (1970).
- Barbara Harrisson: Kain Hitam: The Painted Cave, in: G. Barker and L. Farr eds., Archaeological Investigations in the Niah Caves, Sarawak. Archaeology of the Niah Caves, Sarawak, vol. 2, Cambridge, McDonald Institute for Archaeological Research, McDonald Institute Monographs, S11-S19 (2016).

=== Primatology and nature conservation ===
- Barbara Harrisson: A Study of Orang-Utan Behaviour in the Semi-wild State, Sarawak Museum Journal, vol. IX,15-16, p. 422-447 (1960).
- Barbara Harrisson: Orang-Utan, London: Collins (1962), Singapore: Oxford University Press (1987) dt.: Kinder des Urwalds. Meine Arbeit mit Orang-Utans auf Borneo, Wiesbaden: Brockhaus (1964), Fischer Taschenbuch-Verlag (1979), ISBN 3-596-23510-3.
- Barbara Harrisson: Education to Wild Living of Young Orang-Utans at Bako National Park, Sarawak, Sarawak Museum Journal, vol. XI,21-22, p. 220-258 (1963)
- Barbara Harrisson: Conservation of Non-Human Primates in 1970, Primates in Medicine, vol. 5, p. 98 ff. (1971)
- Barbara Harrisson: International Proposal to Regulate Trade in Non-Human Primates, Primates, Bd. 13(1), S. 111-114 (1972) doi:10.1007/BF01757942

=== Autobiography ===
- Barbara Harrisson (Ed. Judith M. Heimann): A Life of Discovery and Wonder − An Autobiography, Geldermalsen Publications (2026), ISBN 9789072370143

== Literature ==
- Piotr Romanowski and Elżbieta Szumska: Güttlerowie, Złoty Stok (2016), publisher: Usługi Turystyczne AURUM, ISBN 978-8394014124 (History of the Güttler family in Reichenstein; in Polish).
- Rainforest Foraging and Farming in Island Southeast Asia. The Archaeology of Niah Caves, Sarawak Volume 1, Graeme Barker (ed.), McDonald Institute Monographs; Cambridge: McDonald Institute of Archaeological Research, 2013. ISBN 9781902937540.
- H. James Birx: Encyclopedia of Anthropology: Barbara Harrisson (p. 1502), SAGE Publications (2005), ISBN 978-1-5063-2003-8.
- Judith M. Heimann: The Most Offending Soul Alive: Tom Harrisson and His Remarkable Life, University of Hawaii Press (1999), ISBN 978-0-8248-2199-9.
