= Jock Marshall =

Australian writer, academic and ornithologist

- Born: 17 February 1911; Redfern, New South Wales
- Died: 20 July 1967 (aged 56)
- Scientific career
- Thesis: Studies in sexual periodicity in vertebrates (1949)
- Doctoral advisor: John Baker

Alan John "Jock" Marshall (17 February 1911 – 20 July 1967) was an Australian writer, academic and ornithologist.

Marshall was born in Redfern, New South Wales. Despite having lost an arm in a shooting accident at the age of sixteen, he was active in several natural history expeditions, and had a distinguished service record during World War II in New Guinea, 1941–1945. He was Reader in zoology and comparative anatomy at St Bartholomew's Medical College, University of London, 1949–1960, and foundation professor of zoology and comparative physiology, then Dean of Science, at Monash University 1960–1967.

Marshall died in Heidelberg, Victoria. During his lifetime, he published numerous books and scientific papers and had been awarded the Royal Geographical Society's Back Award in 1948. He was elected a Fellow of the Royal Australasian Ornithologists Union in 1958.

He will be remembered by older generations of radio listeners as "Jock the Backyard Naturalist", a regular on the Argonauts Club until 1946.

== Legacy ==
The Jock Marshall Reserve, an ecological research facility which he established at the Clayton campus of Monash University, is named after him.

== Publications ==
- Marshall, Alan John. (1937). The Black Musketeers. The Work and Adventures of a Scientist on a South Sea Island at War and in Peace. William Heinemann: London.
- Marshall, Alan John. (1938). The Men and Birds of Paradise. Journeys through Equatorial New Guinea. William Heinemann: London.
- Marshall, Alan John. (1942). Australia Limited. Angus & Robertson: Sydney.
- Marshall, Alan John. (1954). Bower-birds, their displays and breeding cycles. A preliminary statement. Clarendon Press: Oxford, U.K.
- Marshall, Alan John. (1970). Darwin and Huxley in Australia. Hodder & Stoughton: Sydney.
- Marshall, Alan John. (Ed). (1966). The Great Extermination. A guide to Anglo-Australian Cupidity, Wickedness and Waste. Heinemann: Melbourne.
- Marshall, Alan John; & Drysdale, Russell. (1966). Journey Among Men. Sun Books: Melbourne.
