= Henrietta Hutton =

British ornithologist

Henrietta Hutton (née Cooke; 1939–1963) was a British ornithologist and a founding member of the Oxford University Women's Exploration Club. She was also the Chair of the Oxford Ornithologist Society. The Henrietta Hutton Research Grant was established in Hutton's name in 1964 with a financial endowment of about £5,000, which has been administered by the Royal Geographical Society with IBG (RGS) from 1964 to present. The grants are used to fund geographical fieldwork by undergraduate and postgraduate students. Originally awarded to female geographers from the University of Oxford, the awards are now open to applicants of both sexes from any higher education institution in the United Kingdom. To date, over 130 students have received a Henrietta Hutton Research Grant to support overseas geographical fieldwork.

== Life ==
Henrietta Hutton was born in 1939, and died in 1963 after a traffic accident. She was a British ornithologist and a founding member of the Oxford University Women's Exploration Club. Hutton had been a member of the University expedition to the Madeiras in 1961, and was a member of Lady Margaret Hall. She was also the Chair of the Oxford Ornithologist Society.

== Henrietta Hutton Research Grant ==
The Henrietta Hutton Research Grant was established in Hutton's name in 1964 with a financial endowment of about £5,000, which has been administered by the RGS from 1964 to present. The grants are used to fund geographical fieldwork by undergraduate and postgraduate students. Originally awarded to female geographers from the University of Oxford, the awards are now open to male and female applicants from any UK Higher Education Institution. To date, over 130 students have received a Henrietta Hutton Research Grant to support overseas geographical fieldwork.

On 15 May 2014, an event was held at the RGS, to celebrate 50 years of the Henrietta Hutton Research Grant and the contribution the awards have made to support female geographers. The grants were featured on a BBC Radio 4 Woman's Hour, broadcast 16 May 2014.

Notable recipients of the grant include Linda Partridge (1970), artist Dafila Scott (1973), geographer Rita Gardner (1977) and trumpeter and former journalist Laura Garwin (1979).
