= Tom Harrisson =

British polymath

- Born: 26 September 1911; Buenos Aires, Argentina
- Died: 16 January 1976 (aged 64); Thailand
- Occupations: Ornithologist; Explorer; Journalist; Broadcaster; Soldier; Ethnologist; Museum curator; Archaeologist; Documentarian; Filmmaker; Conservationist; Writer

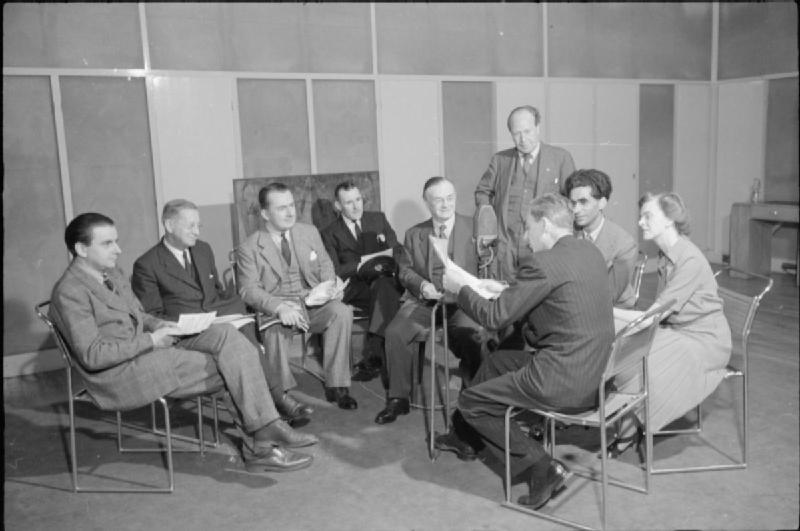
A scene in the studio during the broadcast of the BBC radio programme 'Answering You' in 1941. Left to right the panel are: Tom Harrisson, public opinion expert and co-founder of Mass-Observation; Sir Henry Bunbury; Edward Hulton, publishing house proprietor; District Officer A.F. Locke, a fireman; L.S. Amery, Secretary of State for India; W.J. Brown, Secretary of the Civil Service Clerical Association; and Z.A. Bokhari, poet and broadcaster and an Indian living in London. Also present are Mrs Vyvyan Adams and, with his back to the camera, the presenter, Stanley Maxted.

Major Tom Harnett Harrisson, DSO, OBE (26 September 1911 – 16 January 1976) was an Argentine-born British polymath. In the course of his life he was an ornithologist, explorer, journalist, broadcaster, soldier, guerrilla, ethnologist, museum curator, archaeologist, documentarian, film-maker, conservationist and writer. He was often described as an anthropologist, and sometimes referred to as the "Barefoot Anthropologist".

Educated at Harrow School and dropping out of a natural science degree at University of Cambridge, Harrison later moved to Oxford and became involved in anthropological research through the Oxford University Exploration Club. During this time he was involved in ornithological and anthropological research in Sarawak (1932) and the New Hebrides (1933–35). He was a founder of the social observation organisation Mass-Observation. During World War II, he served in the Borneo campaign. After the war, he remained in Sarawak and was a curator of the Sarawak Museum and was involved in research around the island with his wife Barbara Harrisson, including a notable excavation in Great Niah Cave. Harisson also played a role in suppressing the 1962 Brunei revolt.

Harrisson authored several books and presented television documentaries on anthropology, his travels and research. He left Sarawak in 1967, taking positions at Cornell University and University of Sussex. He died in a road accident in Thailand.

== Early life and education ==
Harrisson was born on 26 September 1911 in Buenos Aires, Argentina, the son of Geoffry Harnett Harrisson (1881–1939), an engineer, and Marie Ellen Cole (1886–1961). Another son, William Damer Harrisson, was born in 1913. The family lived in Concordia, Entre Ríos where his father had been working as a railway engineer and then manager since 1907. In 1914, at the start of the First World War, the family sailed to the United Kingdom where Geoffry Harrisson joined the British army. He was highly decorated for his service and eventually rose to the rank of Brigadier-General.

Harrisson was socially isolated throughout these early years, with no friends apart from his brother. His father was away in the army, and his mother showed little interest in her children. The family moved frequently, and Harrisson later recalled no "lived in, loved place". With no toys to occupy them, their nanny Kitty Asbury entertained her charges with long country walks, which stimulated a great interest in nature. Harrisson had learnt to read by the age of five by studying Asbury's books on natural history. Harrisson's great aunt was Ada Cole who campaigned for humane conditions for British horses exported to the continent for slaughter. Harrisson recollected his aunt scolding him when a young boy for being cruel to a slug.

In 1919, Harrisson's parents moved back to Argentina, "dumping" – as Harrisson later described it – their sons at Eastacre preparatory school and later Winton House preparatory school, Winchester. School holidays were spent unhappily as paying guests at various vicarages. There was a brief interlude during 1922 and 1923, when Harrisson and his brother were taken back to Argentina by their father. It was the best year of his childhood. With his father as teacher, he learnt to hunt, fly-fish and climb. He became interested in birds: he built an aviary and studied their behaviour. Socially and linguistically isolated in Argentina, he also felt a stranger in England, even more so after his year in South America. In a 1960 radio interview, he reflected on this period, and stated that "this feeling both of belonging intensely, emotionally, sentimentally with England and yet of not belonging to it and finding its habits and its people and its voices and its faces strange keeps on producing sensations even to this day of strangeness wherever I go".

Harrisson attended Harrow School from 1925 to 1930, a boarder in the house of his sympathetic godfather, Rev. D. B. Kittermaster, who was particularly supportive of boys such as Harrisson who were rebellious and did not fit in. Harrisson had little interest in interacting with his fellow schoolboys, but nevertheless took an intense interest in them, keeping a card index on every boy. He was also fascinated by issues of hierarchy and status at the school. He continued his interest in ornithology, and supported by his housemaster, who allowed him to roam beyond the school grounds, he wrote and published a book on birds of the area. After participating in several bird censuses, at the age of 19 he organized 1300 other birdwatchers in a pioneering census of the Great Crested Grebe. The census later became a fixture of British birdwatching, and brought him into contact with many of the leading figures of natural sciences when he continued his education at Pembroke College, Cambridge. Harrisson enjoyed friendship with such as Malcolm Lowry but abandoned his studies at Cambridge for the ambience of Oxford, whence he participated in expeditions organised with Oxford University Exploration Club - notably a 6 month long expedition to northern Sarawak in 1932, and then a longer one to the New Hebrides from 1934 to 1936.

In 1937, Harrisson, with Humphrey Jennings and Charles Madge, founded Mass-Observation, a project to study the everyday lives of ordinary people in Britain. An early project, Worktown, was based in Bolton. His cousin, BBC World Service broadcaster Anne Symonds (mother of the journalist Matthew Symonds by John Beavan, Baron Ardwick), worked with him at Mass-Observation for a time.

In July 1939 he presented East End, a 45 minute long BBC television documentary in which he 'explore[d] London's East End, introducing Cockney and Jew, Lascar and Chinaman, and others of its inhabitants'.

== Military service ==
During the Second World War Harrisson continued directing Mass-Observation and was radio critic for The Observer from May 1942 until June 1944. For much of this time he was in the army and gave up reviewing on leaving the UK. After service in the ranks he was commissioned as a second lieutenant in the Reconnaissance Corps on 21 November 1943. He had been recruited (some sources say by a confusion of names, despite his apparent suitability) for a plan to use the native peoples of Borneo against the Japanese. He was attached to Z Special Unit (also known as Z Force), part of the Services Reconnaissance Department (SRD: a branch of the combined Allied Intelligence Bureau in the South West Pacific theatre). On 25 March 1945, he was parachuted with seven Z Force operatives from a Consolidated Liberator onto a high plateau occupied by the Kelabit people. An autobiographical account of this operation (SEMUT I, one of four SEMUT operations in the area) is given in World Within (Cresset Press, 1959); there are also reports – not always flattering – from some of his comrades. His efforts to rescue stranded American airmen shot down over Borneo are a central part of "The Airmen and the Headhunters", an episode of the PBS television series Secrets of the Dead. The recommendation for his Distinguished Service Order which was gazetted on 6 March 1947 (and dated 2 November 1946) describes how from his insertion until 15 August 1945 the forces under his command protected the flank of Allied advances, and caused severe disruption to Japanese operations.

== Ethnological work ==
Following the war, he was Curator of the Sarawak Museum 1947–1966 (although he did not relinquish his commission until 14 March 1951). In the 1950s and 1960s Tom and Barbara Harrisson undertook pioneering excavations in the West Mouth of the Great Cave at Niah, Sarawak. Their most important discovery was a human skull in deposits dated by radiocarbon to about 40,000 years ago, the earliest date for modern humans in Borneo. The results of their excavations were never published in an appropriate manner leading to uncertainty and doubts as to their results; however, they are largely vindicated by results of excavations carried out by the Niah Cave Project from 2000 to 2003. Three films (amongst more made for British TV) record the Niah work

At the start of the Brunei Revolt in 1962, Resident John Fisher of the 4th Division of Sarawak called on the Dayak tribes for help by sending a boat with the traditional Red Feather of War up the Baram River. Tom Harrisson also arrived in Brunei. He summoned the Kelabits from the highlands around Bario in the 5th Division, the centre of his wartime resistance. Hundreds of Dayaks responded, and formed into companies led by British civilians all commanded by Harrisson. This force reached some 2,000 strong, and with excellent knowledge of the tracks through the interior (there were no roads), helped contain the rebels and cut off their escape route to Indonesia.

== Post-Sarawak ==
Following his retirement aged 55 from the curatorship of the Sarawak Museum, in 1967 Harrisson left for Ithaca, New York to start a three-year contract as senior research associate of the South East Program at Cornell University; his notes, maps, and journals for Central Borneo, 1947–1966, are archived there. However, after the second year he relocated to Britain to take an unpaid role at the University of Sussex, to which he had bequeathed the Mass-Observation archive. In 1974 he was appointed visiting professor, despite never having earned a doctoral degree.

== Personal life, and death ==
Harrisson married three times. In 1939 he was named as co-respondent in the divorce of Bertha Clayton (1908–1961); they had a son, Maxwell Barr (1940–2002), and married in 1940, but divorced in 1954. He met Barbara Brünig when she worked at his Sarawak Museum; they married in London in 1956, but divorced in 1970 after he had met Christine Forani (1916–1976), a Belgian sculptor; they married in 1971. The couple were killed in Thailand when the bus they were travelling in collided with a truck. They were cremated in Bangkok following Thai customs.

== Legacy ==
The title of his biography, The Most Offending Soul Alive, gives a flavour of the strong feelings he engendered, but he also had many admirers and is recognised as a pioneer in several areas.

Harrisson was appointed an Officer of the Order of the British Empire in the 1959 New Year Honours, for his work as curator.

Harrisson appeared twice on Desert Island Discs: in October 1943 and December 1972

Harrisson's series The Borneo Story was broadcast by BBC television in 1957; a subsequent series was produced by ITV in 1962/3. A documentary Tom Harrisson – The Barefoot Anthropologist, hosted by David Attenborough, was first broadcast on BBC4 early in 2007.

The Bornean subspecies of the Sumatran rhinoceros is named after him as Didermocerus sumatrensis harrissoni Groves, 1965

The 1969 French novel Farewell to the King by Pierre Schoendoerffer was inspired by events from Tom Harrisson's wartime Borneo; the book was later turned into a film by American director John Milius – Farewell to the King.

Sam Lightner, Jr.'s book All Elevations Unknown: An Adventure in the Heart of Borneo (Broadway, 2001), tells Harrisson's World War II story in chapters that alternate with Lightner's account of his own climb of Batu Lawi in the Kelabit Highlands of Sarawak.

== Publications ==
As well as numerous papers and monographs in scientific journals, especially the Sarawak Museum Journal, books he authored include:

- Harrisson, T.H. (1931). Birds of the Harrow District 1925–1930. Harrow School.
- Harrisson, T.H. (1933). Letter to Oxford. The Hate Press: Gloucestershire.
- Harrisson, Tom (1937). Savage Civilisation. Victor Gollancz: London.
- Madge, Charles; & Harrisson, Tom (1937). Mass-Observation. Frederick Muller: London.
- Harrisson, Tom (ed). (1938). Borneo Jungle. An account of the Oxford University expedition of 1932. Lindsay Drummond Ltd: London.
- Madge, Charles; & Harrisson, Tom (1939). Britain by Mass-Observation. Penguin: Harmondsworth.
- Harrisson, Tom (1943). Living Among Cannibals. George G. Harrap & Co: London.
- Harrisson, Tom (ed). (1943). The Pub and the People. Victor Gollancz: London.
- Harrisson, Tom (1959). World Within. A Borneo Story. Cresset Press: London.
- Harrisson, Tom (ed). (1959). The Peoples of Sarawak. Sarawak Museum: Kuching.
- Harrisson, Tom (1961). Britain Revisited. Victor Gollancz: London.
- Harrisson, Tom (1970). The Malays of South-West Sarawak before Malaysia. Macmillan: London.
- Harrisson, Tom (1976). Living through the Blitz, Collins, London; newly printed: Faber Finds 2010 ISBN 978-0-571-27103-0.

A complete bibliography of his Southeast Asia related publications can be found in Solheim and Jensen (1977). A list of his herpetology related publications is included in Dodd (2016).
