= Suchet =

Suchet may refer to:

== People ==
- David Suchet (born 1946), British actor
- Jack Suchet (1908–2001), British physician; father of David and John
- John Suchet (born 1944), British newsreader
- Louis-Gabriel Suchet (1770–1826), Marshal of the First French Empire

== Other uses ==
- Le Suchet, a mountain in Switzerland
- French cruiser Suchet
