= Carrie Johnson =

English media advisor (born 1988)

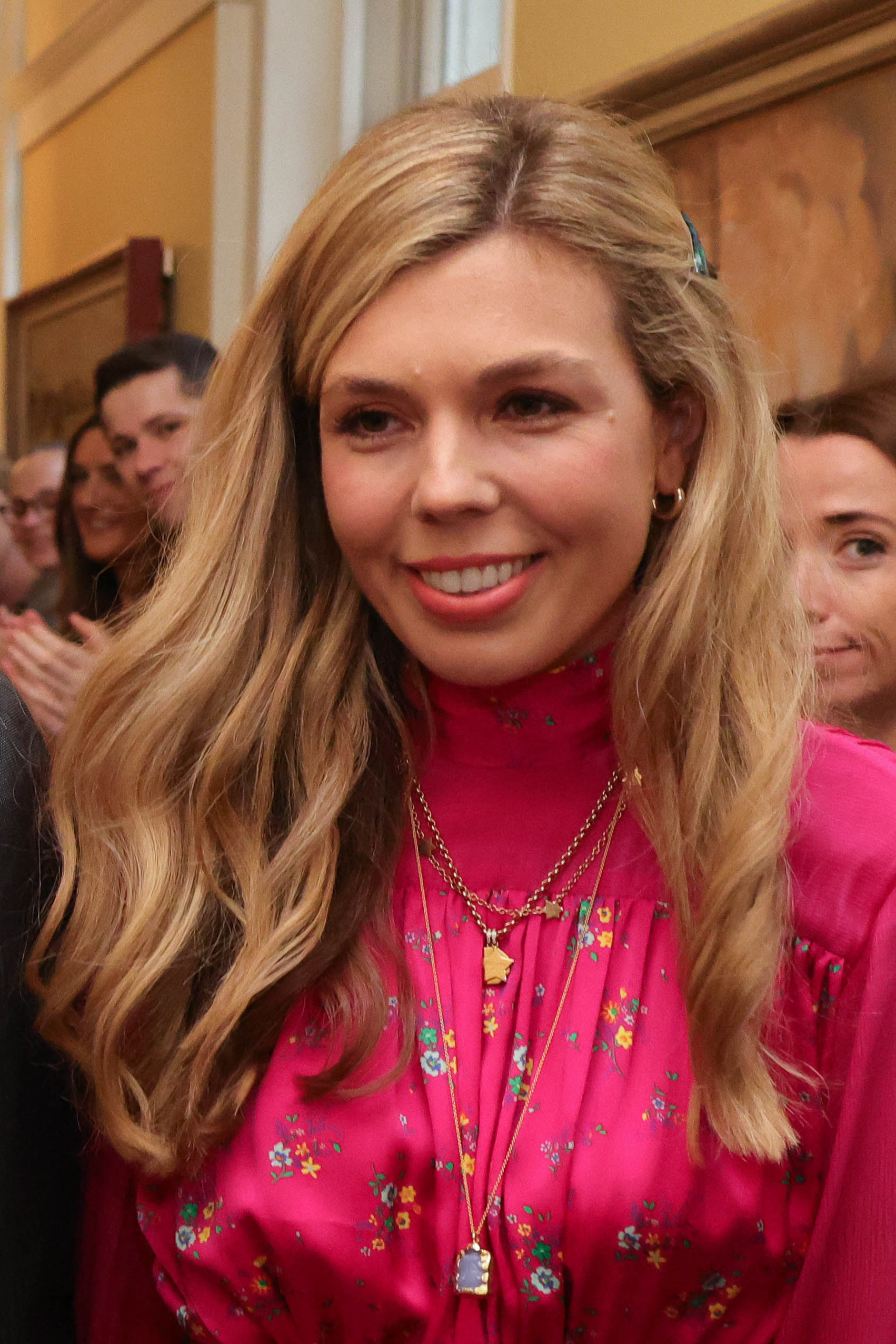
- Johnson in 2022
- Born: Caroline Louise Beavan Symonds; 17 March 1988 (age 38); London, England
- Education: University of Warwick (BA)
- Occupation: Media advisor
- Known for: Spouse of the prime minister of the United Kingdom (2021–2022)
- Political party: Conservative
- Spouse: Boris Johnson (m. 2021)
- Children: 4
- Parents: Matthew Symonds (father); Josephine McAfee (mother)
- Relatives: John Beavan, Baron Ardwick (grandfather); Anne Symonds (grandmother); Stanley Johnson (father-in-law); Charlotte Johnson Wahl (mother-in-law); Rachel Johnson (sister-in-law); Jo Johnson (brother-in-law); Amelia Gentleman (sister-in-law); Julia Johnson (half sister-in-law)

Caroline Louise Beavan Johnson (née Symonds; born 17 March 1988) is an English media consultant, a senior advisor to the ocean conservation charity Oceana, and a patron of the Conservative Animal Welfare Foundation. She is married to politician Boris Johnson, who served as Prime Minister of the United Kingdom and Leader of the Conservative Party from 2019 to 2022.

Born to Matthew Symonds, co-founder of The Independent, and Josephine McAfee, a lawyer, Symonds was raised by her mother in southwest London. Educated at Godolphin and Latymer School and the University of Warwick, she earned a degree in Art History and Theatre Studies. She began working as a press officer for the Conservative Party in 2009 and rose to become the party's head of communications in 2018. In the same year, she began an affair with Johnson, then serving as Foreign Secretary, during his marriage to his second wife, Marina Wheeler. Later that year, Symonds left her role with the Conservative Party for a public relations job at Oceana. Johnson and Wheeler separated in September 2018, and Johnson was later reported to be living with Symonds at her flat in southeast London. In July 2019, after Johnson became Prime Minister, she moved with him to the flat above 11 Downing Street, making her the first unmarried partner of a Prime Minister to officially reside in Downing Street.

In February 2020, shortly after Johnson agreed a divorce settlement with Wheeler, Symonds announced that she and Johnson had become engaged in late 2019 and that she was pregnant. She gave birth to their first child in April 2020. In January 2021, she began working in a senior communications role at the Aspinall Foundation, a wildlife charity. She and Johnson married in May 2021 at Westminster Cathedral, and subsequently had three more children together.

== Early life and education ==
Caroline Louise Beavan Symonds was born on 17 March 1988 to Matthew Symonds, co-founder of The Independent, and Josephine McAfee (née Lawrence), a lawyer working for that newspaper. Her paternal grandfather was John Beavan, Baron Ardwick (at one time editor of the Daily Herald and later, during the 1970s, a Labour Party MEP), and her paternal grandmother was Anne Symonds, a BBC World Service journalist.

Symonds was born following an affair between her parents; both were married to other people at the time. She was brought up by her mother in East Sheen, south-west London, and between 1999 and 2006 attended Godolphin and Latymer School, a private day school for girls. She went to the University of Warwick to study Art History and Theatre Studies, graduating as BA (Hons) in 2009.

== Career and political activism ==
Symonds originally planned to become an actor, and unsuccessfully auditioned for the 2007 film Atonement. She subsequently worked in marketing.

In 2009, Symonds joined the Conservative Party as a press officer. She worked at Conservative Campaign Headquarters, and later campaigned for Boris Johnson in the 2010 London Conservative Party mayoral selection. During this period, Symonds had a role running campaigns for the newly elected MP Zac Goldsmith. She has also worked as a media special adviser for Conservative Cabinet ministers Sajid Javid (Communities, Local Government and Housing Secretary) and John Whittingdale (Culture, Media and Sport Secretary). Symonds was present when Whittingdale and others launched Conservative Friends of Russia (later called the Westminster Russia Forum and disbanded in March 2022) and has attended several of its meetings.

Symonds became the Conservative Party's head of communications in 2018, but left the position later that year, taking up a job in public relations for the Oceana project. It was reported that she was asked to leave her post as director of communications, with Conservative Party sources in the Daily Mail newspaper claiming that the firing was due to poor performance and allegations of significant unjustified expenses claims. These accusations were claimed by an anonymous "longtime colleague" to be a smear campaign allegedly spread by Symonds's political strategist, Lynton Crosby (subsequently denied by Crosby).

In January 2021, Symonds was recruited to a senior communications role at the Aspinall Foundation, a wildlife charity. At the time, she was reported to be receiving a "high five-figure salary." In August 2025, the foundation declined to confirm whether she was still employed there.

She is a patron of the Conservative Animal Welfare Foundation.

=== John Worboys case ===
In 2007, aged 19, Symonds was driven home from a King's Road nightclub by taxi-driver John Worboys, who in 2009 was convicted of multiple sexual assaults on his passengers. Worboys offered her champagne, which she surreptitiously did not drink. Worboys stopped the cab and insisted she drink some vodka; Johnson believed both drinks were spiked. Worboys ultimately took her home before she was incapacitated as she said her mother was waiting for her, but, crucially, gave her his phone number, which she was later able to cite at the trial. After returning home Johnson began vomiting and laughing hysterically, and passed out in the empty bathtub, waking at 3pm the next day.

Symonds was one of fourteen women who testified against Worboys at his trial. She subsequently told The Telegraph that he was "a sad, wicked man who is a danger to society. I feel so angry that he pleaded not guilty and made us go through the pain of giving evidence in court".

Symonds was the youngest of Worboys's victims, and waived her anonymity to talk about her experiences and, later, to campaign against his early release, fundraising for a successful judicial review of the decision.

== Public and personal life ==
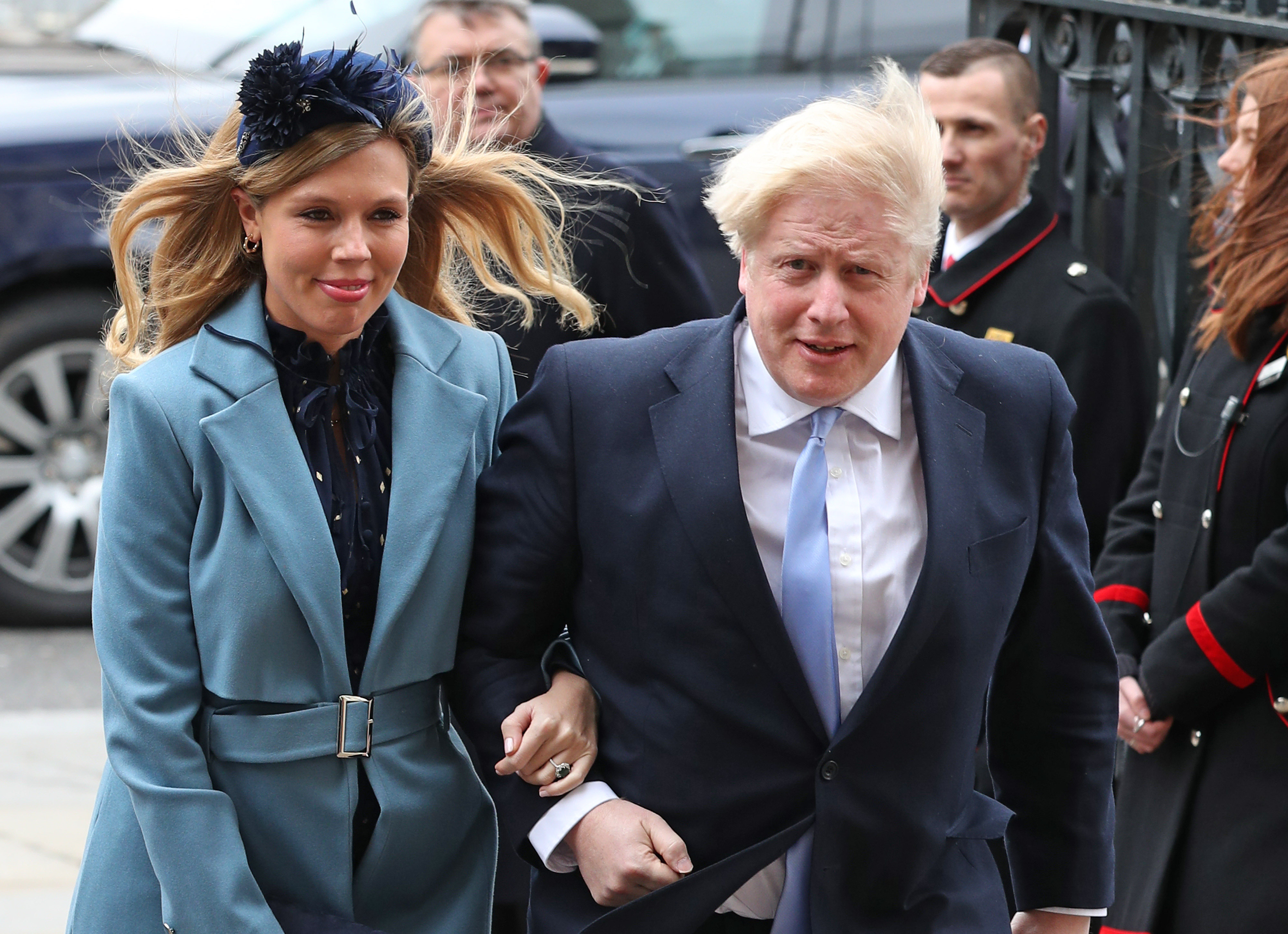
Symonds and Boris Johnson on Commonwealth Day, March 2020

Symonds was previously in a relationship with The Sun journalist Harry Cole.

She began an affair with British politician Boris Johnson, then Foreign Secretary, in 2018 while he was married to his second wife, Marina Wheeler. In July 2019, Johnson became prime minister and both he and Symonds officially moved into the flat above 11 Downing Street. She was the first unmarried partner of a prime minister to reside at Downing Street. The following month, she was barred from entering the United States as her visa application was rejected due to a previous visit with her close friend Nimco Ali to Somaliland, which the US considers to be part of immigration-restricted Somalia. On 16 August 2019, she made her first public appearance since entering 10 Downing Street, when she addressed what she called the "gigantic" climate crisis.

On 29 February 2020, Symonds and Boris Johnson announced that they had become engaged in late 2019 and were expecting their first child together in early summer. Their son, Wilfred Lawrie Nicholas Johnson, was born on 29 April 2020 in London. She is a Catholic and had her son baptised into the Catholic Church.

Symonds married Boris Johnson in secrecy on 29 May 2021 in a Catholic ceremony at Westminster Cathedral attended by thirty guests. In July 2021, she announced that they were expecting their second child together, also revealing that she had suffered a miscarriage earlier that year. Their daughter, Romy Iris Charlotte Johnson, was born on 9 December 2021 in London. Their third child, a son named Frank Alfred Odysseus Johnson, was born on 5 July 2023, at UCLH. Their fourth child, a daughter named Poppy Eliza Josephine, was born on 21 May 2025.

Amid the Partygate scandal, she was issued with a fixed penalty notice for £100 in April 2022 for breaching COVID-19 regulations. She apologised and paid the penalty, which was halved to £50 due to her paying within 14 days. In the 2023 Channel 4 docudrama Partygate, she was played by Rebecca Humphries.

=== Political influence ===
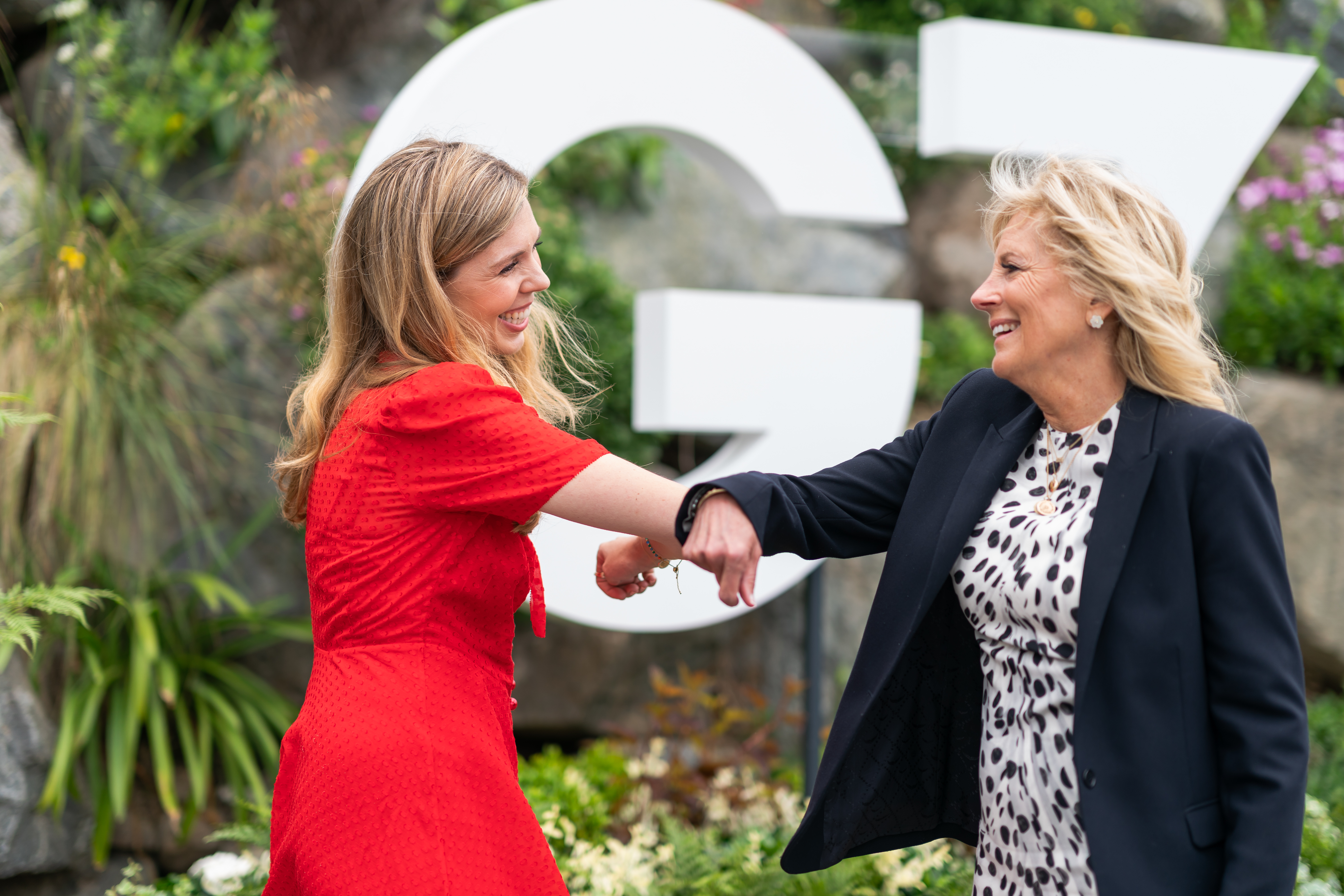
Johnson greeting U.S. First Lady Jill Biden at the 47th G7 summit in Cornwall, June 2021

Concerns over her influence on the prime minister were raised in January 2020, when it came to light that she had received briefs from animal rights activists just before the government pulled a planned cull of badgers in Derbyshire. An association representing farmers, the NFU, asserted that this meeting and her influence played a key role in the government ignoring scientific advice in favour of retaining the cull.

According to The Guardian, a judicial review was granted permission to examine how the decision was reached. She was also influential in making sure that Lee Cain did not get a job as the prime minister's chief of staff, and urged Boris Johnson to fire environment secretary George Eustice from his role. She was additionally involved in a political controversy over the refurbishment of the 11 Downing Street flat, and her comments over the flat's decor being a "John Lewis furniture nightmare" (John Lewis typically being an aspirational, upper-middle-class shop) led to accusations of snobbery.

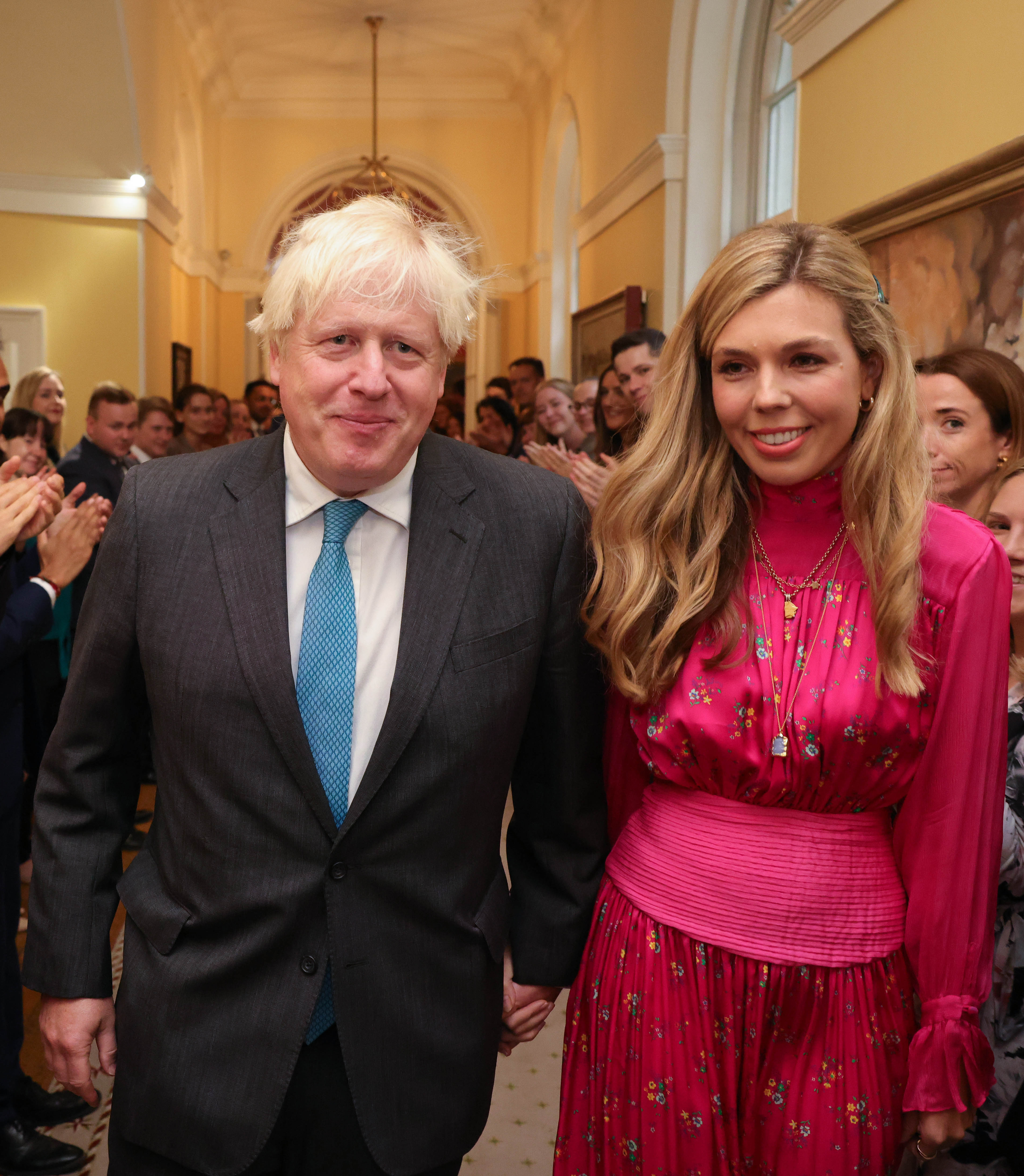
Carrie and Boris Johnson departing 10 Downing Street

During Dominic Cummings's tenure as chief adviser, Cummings and Carrie Symonds were said to represent two separate factions influencing the prime minister. Cummings also said that the prime minister "cancel[led] an inquiry about a leak ... because it might implicate his girlfriend's friends"; Cummings accused Henry Newman, the senior adviser in Downing Street and ally of Carrie Symonds, of being a "chatty rat" who leaked plans for a second lockdown in October. Cummings later said in 2021 that Symonds acted "illegally" in awarding influential jobs to her friends, including press secretary Allegra Stratton.

Conservative MP Caroline Nokes asserted that Carrie Johnson's influence has been exaggerated for sexist purposes; she has been likened to both Lady Macbeth and Marie Antoinette ("Carrie Antoinette") by her critics. Writing in The Sunday Times, Marie Le Conte disagreed that such criticism is sexist. Journalist Sarah Vine, on the other hand, said that while it is easy to "blame the woman", the truth is "far more complicated", adding that Johnson's head did not deserve "to be on the block".

In December 2021, Politico Europe named her as one of the "disrupters" in its annual list of 28 people who will shape Europe in the year to come.

In February 2022, Carrie Johnson's spokeswoman denied that Johnson has influence over her husband amidst allegations from Tory peer Lord Ashcroft, who had written an unauthorised biography of her. Labour leader Keir Starmer said in relation to the book, "I approach politics on the basis that we should treat people with respect... Obviously, respect differences of opinion, but I do not go along with the idea that we should drag everybody into the gutter."

In June 2022, an article by Simon Walters appeared in The Times alleging that Boris Johnson recommended Carrie, who was then his mistress, as a candidate for a £100,000 per annum job as Chief-of-Staff in the Foreign Office while Johnson was Foreign Secretary. After senior aide Ben Gascoigne threatened to resign if she was appointed, the proposal was dropped. This story was removed from the paper after No. 10 intervened, although Walters says that he stands by the story.

In July 2023, Politico cited an article from UnHerd in which Johnson is called "the nation's Bopea tradwife."

Unofficial roles
Vacant Title last held by Marina Wheeler; De jure	Spouse of the Prime Minister of the United Kingdom; 2021–2022	Succeeded by Hugh O'Leary
