= William Ewer =

William Ewer may refer to:

- William Norman Ewer, journalist
- William Ewer (banker), English merchant, banker and politician
