= Anne Symonds =

English broadcaster (1916–2017)

- Born: Anne Hilda Harrisson; 22 August 1916; Liverpool, England
- Died: 6 February 2017 (aged 100)
- Education: Somerville College, Oxford
- Occupation: Journalist
- Spouse: Richard Symonds (m. 1940; div. 1948)
- Children: Matthew Symonds
- Relatives: Tom Harrisson (cousin); Carrie Johnson (granddaughter)

Anne Hilda Symonds (née Harrisson; 22 August 1916 – 6 February 2017) was an English broadcaster on culture and politics for the BBC World Service.

== Early life ==
Symonds was born in Liverpool on 22 August 1916, the second child of Major Roland Damer Harrisson (1881–1917), DSO, of the Royal Field Artillery, and Hilda Beatrice Corbett (1888–1972), a Ruskin School of Art-trained landscape painter and daughter of solicitor S. M. Grierson, of Liverpool. Major Harrisson, who farmed in the parish of Easton Grey near Malmesbury in Wiltshire, died the year after his daughter's birth. Her elder brother, Peter Damer Harrisson, became a consultant forester.

Although some believed her to be the illegitimate daughter of Prime Minister H. H. Asquith, whom her mother had met in 1915, she was convinced otherwise. Asquith was, however, a regular presence in her early childhood. He supported her mother financially and let her stay over in London and Sutton Courtenay. "Anne is the greatest dear", he wrote to Hilda in 1920. The widowed Hilda moved to Boars Hill in Berkshire to live with her mother, and became an accomplished painter of landscapes in oil and portraits in pencil, a friend of Stanley and Gilbert Spencer and of Paul and John Nash, as well as Robert Bridges, John Masefield and Robert Graves – who used to buy Anne sweets at the village shop.

At the age of eight, Symonds was sent to the Farmhouse School, near Wendover, where students were required to undertake farm work. She made friends with Anne and Judith Stephen, nieces of Virginia Woolf. When she was fifteen, she moved to Oxford High School, and in 1934 she went up to Somerville College, Oxford, where she read PPE, and held office in the Oxford University Labour Club. Her Oxford friends included the future MPs Denis Healey and Christopher Mayhew.

== Career ==
Symonds's first job was as a researcher for Lord Beaverbrook, and writing for the Evening Standard. In 1939, she travelled to America, and in May 1940, she married an Oxford friend, Richard Symonds, who was sent to India with the Cripps Mission. With the Quakers, she set up a home for evacuee children in Torquay, Devon, and then worked briefly with her cousin Tom Harrisson on Mass Observation. Later, she was given a job at the Ministry of Information, working under Arthur Gore, 8th Earl of Arran. As the war in Europe ended, she was dispatched to Austria, working in Vienna and Carinthia on copy for Austrian newspapers, where she met the executioner Albert Pierrepoint. In 1945, she wrote a book as "Anne Damer" with Jack Denton Scott, called Too Lively to Live.

In 1948, Symonds was divorced from her husband and applied for a job with the BBC Overseas Service, commissioning talks and making arts and other programmes. She worked on Under Big Ben and the Meet an MP spot for London Calling Europe. She was close to Hugh Gaitskell and Denis Healey. In 1953, she gave birth to Matthew Symonds, son of John Beavan and co-founder of The Independent. He is the father of Carrie Johnson, the wife of former Prime Minister Boris Johnson.

After retiring from the BBC in 1976, Symonds edited APEX’s journal for Denis Howell and assisted on the quarterly Europe Left, the magazine of the Labour Movement for Europe. She died on 6 February 2017, at the age of 100.
