= Douglas Machray =

British newspaper editor

Douglas Basil Machray (1 September 1911 – 15 June 1977) was a British newspaper editor, and the editor of the Daily Herald from 1957 to 1960.

Douglas Basil Machray was born in Lancashire, England, on 1 September 1911.

Machray was 46 when he took over from the sacked Sydney Elliott as editor of the Daily Herald in 1957, having previously been in sub-editing, then production editor. Machray shifted the paper's stance to being in favour of unilateral nuclear disarmament, which was supported by the majority of its readers, and the left of the Labour Party, but not its leaders, or the TUC.

Machray died in 1977.

Media offices
Preceded by Percy Cudlipp	Editor of the Daily Herald; 1957–1960	Succeeded by John Beaven
