= Ann Spokes Symonds =

Ann Hazel Spokes Symonds (10 November 1925 – 27 December 2019) was a British author and former Lord Mayor of Oxford.

Spokes was born in November 1925, the daughter of Peter Spencer Spokes and Lilla Clayton. Her father founded the Museum of Oxford in 1974. She was a writer on the history of Oxford.

She entered St Anne's College, Oxford in 1944, where she read Philosophy, Politics and Economics, obtaining her B.A. and Master of Arts. She was a trustee of the Oxford Preservation Trust, having first become a trustee in 1959. She served as Lord Mayor of Oxford in 1976/77 and also as the Chairman of Oxfordshire County Council between 1981 and 1983. Spokes-Symonds chaired Age Concern England from 1983 to 1986. She made a donation towards a statue of Alfred Russel Wallace which has been erected at the Natural History Museum.

In 1980 she married the United Nations official and historian Richard Symonds (1918–2006) and was henceforth known as Ann Spokes Symonds.

She died in December 2019 at the age of 94.

== Books ==
Spokes Symonds' books include:

- The Origins of Oxford Street Names (with Nigel Morgan).
- The Changing Faces of Iffley.
- The Changing Faces of Wolvercote with Wytham and Godstow.
- Also-Rans: The Injustice of History.
- The Changing Faces of North Oxford; Books I & II.
- Storks, Black Bags & Gooseberry Bushes.
- The Changing Faces of Rose Hill.
- The Changing Faces of Summertown and Cutteslowe; Books I & II (with Christopher Nichols).
- Celebrating Age: An Anthology.
- Follow Me: A Dog's View of the Gospel Story (with Richard Symonds).
