= Kathleen Sully =

English novelist (1910–2001)

- Born: Kathleen Maude Coussell; 14 April 1910; London, UK
- Died: 4 September 2001 (aged 91); Camborne-Redruth, Cornwall, UK
- Occupation: Writer
- Spouse: Charles Sully

Kathleen Sully (14 April 1910 – 4 September 2001) was an English novelist.

== Life ==
Sully was the second of seven children born to Albert and Kate Coussell. Albert was an engineer and the family moved numerous times around London during Kathleen's childhood. According to a short biographical sketch on the dust jacket of her first novel, Canal in Moonlight, she left school at fifteen but later studied dress design at Barrett Street Trade School. The same source reports that "She has enjoyed a varied career as a domestic, life attendant, dress model, dress cutter, dress designer, dress-shop owner, professional swimmer and diver, canvasser, bus conductress, cinema usherette, free-lance artist and writer, tracer in the Admiralty, and dress-maker."

She married Charles Sully in Willesden, Middlesex in 1932. The 1939 census recorded them as living in Weston-Super-Mare, where Charles worked as an aeronautical engineer and Kathleen as a housewife. They had three children: two daughters, then a son.

In 1946, she published two children's books, Small Creatures and Stony Stream, with illustrations by Rene Cloke, part of a series titled "Truth in a Tale" published by Edmund Ward Ltd. In 1948, she attended St. Albans Art College and in 1950 attended the Gaddesden Teacher Training College, from which she earned a teaching certificate and took a teaching post in Art and English.

In 1955, her first novel, Canal in Moonlight, was published by Peter Davies. The story of the chaotic life of a large and impoverished family living alongside a stagnant industrial canal in a nameless city, it received positive reviews, with many reviewers noting in particular the unique setting and tone, a mix of absurd comedy and bleak tragedy. John Betjeman wrote, "I have never anything like it.... It is no good my going on describing this book or trying to convey its at once hopeful and desolating climax.... Her book will either disgust you or do what it did to me, purge you with pity and frighten you with its sense of loneliness." Writing in the Sunday Times, Anthony Rhodes called it "one of the finest novels of its kind I have read."

Her next book, published in 1956, Canaille collected two short novels, "For What We Receive" and "The Weeping and The Laughter." In his review for The Observer, John Wain called Sully "a writer of originality and power. In ....Canaille, these qualities are so much to the fore that one never knows what she will do from one page to the next."

In 1957, Lindsay Anderson convinced her to write a play for an innovative series he produced with the English Stage Company at the Royal Court Theatre. On 30 June 1957, in his professional debut as a director, Anderson staged the play, with Ian Bannen in the title role, without decor. Her fourth novel, Merrily to the Grave, for which Elizabeth Bowen praised Sully's 'forceful, bizarre, singular gifts,' was adapted as a radio play for the BBC in 1959.

In the space of fifteen years, Sully published seventeen novels. She worked exclusively with the publisher Peter Davies. Two themes were consistently cited by reviewers: her originality (Jack Denton Scott: "She is something quite on her own") and her strong narrative drive (Siriol Hugh Jones on Burden of the Seed: "It is impossible to stop reading Kathleen Sully, who takes a vice-like Ancient Mariner's grip on your nerves and feelings...."). Her subjects ranged from old age, ghosts, infidelity, mid-life crisis, and small-town mores. Her most striking book, Skrine, is a dystopian novel set in a depopulated England following some unspecified global catastrophe. A lone wanderer, Skrine, comes upon a village run by a band of armed men and learns how complex and delicate the politics of power can be, even in a small and isolated community. Brian Aldiss wrote that "Miss Sully's splintery prose captures these fractured life patterns with remarkable effect."

In response to a questionnaire for Gale Research's Contemporary Authors series in 1979, she wrote, "Main interest now and ever since I could think: Man--why and whence.... Have written since a child but stuff mostly too off-beat for publication. Interests in general: philosophy; art; realistic literature; dancing; swimming and diving; teaching; diet and health--mental and physical; why the chicken crossed the road." She identified her politics as Liberal ("if anything") and her religion as Christian ("not a church-goer").

She appears not to have published anything after A Look at the Tadpoles in 1970. All her books are out of print and her work has thus far gone without notice in surveys of the English novel. She died in 2001.

== Works ==
=== Children's books ===
- Small Creatures, 1946
- Stony Stream, 1946

=== Novels ===
- Canal in Moonlight, 1955 (published in US as Bikka Road by Coward-McCann)
- Canaille, 1956
- Through the Wall, 1957
- Merrily to the Grave, 1958
- Burden of the Seed, 1958
- A Man Talking to Seagulls, 1959
- Shade of Eden, 1960
- Skrine, 1960
- A Man on the Roof, 1961
- The Undesired, 1961
- The Fractured Smile, 1965
- Not Tonight, 1966
- Dear Wolf, 1967
- Horizontal Image, 1968
- A Breeze on a Lonely Road, 1969
- Island in Moonlight, 1970
- A Look at the Tadpoles, 1970 ISBN 9780432160107

=== Play ===
- The Waiting of Lester Abbs, 1957
