= St Anne's Academy =

Location
- Hollin Lane; Middleton, Greater Manchester, M24 6XN; United Kingdom; 53°34′00″N 2°12′09″W

Information
- Type: Academy
- Motto: We have Faith in our future
- Religious affiliation: Church of England
- Established: 01 September 2007
- Local authority: Rochdale
- Specialist: Teaching and Learning
- Department for Education URN: 135313 Tables
- Ofsted: Reports
- Chair: Canon Nicholas Feist
- Principal: Caroline Preece
- Gender: Mixed-sex
- Age: 11 to 16
- Enrolment: 800
- Website: www.stannesacademy.org.uk

St Anne's Academy is an 11–16 mixed comprehensive academy in Middleton area of the Metropolitan Borough of Rochdale in Greater Manchester, United Kingdom. The school has specialist status in Teaching and Learning. The school has 800 students on roll,

== History ==
St Anne's Academy opened in September 2007 replacing The Queen Elizabeth School that in turn was previously Hollin High School. The school has a capacity of up to 900 places. The academy is jointly supported by the Church of England Diocese of Manchester, and David and Anne Crossland. In 2007 the Academy received £17.6 million to build additional and refurbish existing buildings. The project was funded by the Church of England, private backers David and Anne Crossland, founders of Airtours Travel and the Government's Building Schools for the future programme. The work was completed summer 2012.

== School Performance ==
During a 2012 Ofsted inspection the school was described as providing a good education to students providing guidance and support tailored to individual students needs with outstanding effectiveness of care, guidance and support. However pupil attendance was found to be Inadequate.

== Alumni ==
=== Queen Elizabeth Grammar School ===
- Julie Goodyear (née Kemp) MBE, actress who played Bet Lynch in Coronation Street mainly from 1970 to 1995
- Prof Philip Grime FRS, Professor of Botany from 1983 to 1998 at the University of Sheffield
- Eric Ogden, Labour MP from 1964 to 1983
- Bob Smithies, photographer
- Frank Tyson, cricketer
- Edward Francis Williams, Baron Francis-Williams CBE, Editor from 1936 to 1940 of the Daily Herald
- Edgar Wood, architect

=== Hollin High School ===
- David Gedge, lead singer of The Wedding Present
- Peter Solowka, guitarist with The Wedding Present
- Mark Burgess, lead singer of The Chameleons
- Reg Smithies, guitarist with The Chameleons
- Dave Fielding, guitarist with The Chameleons
