= Stephen Glover (columnist) =

British journalist and columnist (born 1952)

- Born: 13 January 1952 (age 74)
- Education: Shrewsbury School; Mansfield College, Oxford
- Occupations: Journalist, columnist

Stephen Charles Morton Glover (born 13 January 1952) is a British journalist and columnist for the Daily Mail.

== Early life ==
The son of clergyman John Morton Glover (died 1979), a prebendary of Hereford Cathedral and rector of Broseley, Shropshire, and Helen Ruth, née Jones (died 1984), Glover was educated at Shrewsbury School and Mansfield College, Oxford.

== Career ==
Glover joined the Daily Telegraph in 1978 as a leader writer. He co-founded The Independent in 1986 with Andreas Whittam Smith and Matthew Symonds. All three had previously been journalists on the Telegraph.

Between 1986 and 1990, Glover was foreign editor of The Independent. The paper's early foreign correspondents included James Fenton, Alexander Chancellor, Patrick Marnham and Rupert Cornwell. In 1990, he became the founding editor of The Independent on Sunday.

In 1992, Glover helped Richard Ingrams launch The Oldie magazine with fellow journalists Auberon Waugh, Alexander Chancellor, and Patrick Marnham.

Glover has been a columnist for the London Evening Standard (1992–95), The Daily Telegraph (1995–97), The Spectator (1996–2005), The Independent (2005–12) and The Oldie (2014–23). He has written a column for the Daily Mail since 1998.

In 2004, Glover proposed a new compact upmarket newspaper with fellow journalists Francis Wheen and Frank Johnson. They sought a reported £15.4 million to launch The World, less than the funding for The Independent. The project did not get off the ground.

Glover is the author of Paper Dreams (1993), an account of the founding of The Independent, and editor of The Penguin Book of Journalism (1999). His first novel, Splash!, was published by Constable in 2017.

== Personal life ==
He married Celia Elizabeth Montague in 1982; they have two sons.
