= Sydney Elliott =

British newspaper editor (1902–1987)

- Born: Sydney Robert Elliott; August 31, 1902; Clydeside, Scotland
- Died: 9 October 1987 (aged 85)
- Occupation: Newspaper editor
- Movement: Co-operative
- Relatives: Ben Summerskill (grandson)

Sydney Robert Elliott (31 August 1902 – 9 October 1987) was a British newspaper editor.

== Biography ==
Born on Clydeside, Scotland, Elliott became involved in the co-operative movement. In the late 1920s, he moved to Manchester to become editor of the monthly co-operative journal The Millgate Monthly. In 1929, the Sunday newspaper Reynold's News was bought by the Co-operative Press, and Elliott was appointed as its editor. He worked on updating the appearance of the paper, and appointed H.N. Brailsford and Hamilton Fyfe as columnists. In 1937, he wrote a comprehensive account of the movement, England: Cradle of Co-operation, while he also launched the United Peace Alliance to campaign against Franco in the Spanish Civil War. This soon became the focus of unsuccessful attempts by communists and left-wing members of the Labour Party to create a popular front.

In 1941, Elliott moved to London to work on the Evening Standard, then showing sympathy with radical causes under its editor, Michael Foot. He succeeded Foot as editor in 1943, but left during the run-up to the 1945 general election after owner Lord Beaverbrook began pressing him to advocate a vote for the Conservative Party. He became Editorial Advisor at the Daily Mirror, where he masterminded its campaign to support the Labour Party at the 1945 election. He later moved to supervise the Mirror's newspaper and radio operations in Australia, but returned to become general manager of the Daily Herald in 1952.

Elliott became editor of the Herald in November 1953. In 1957, the Trades Union Congress rescinded its editorial control of the paper to Odhams Press, and Elliott left the paper. He was then engaged by Tim Hewat to research a brief for a television documentary strand on ITV, to be based on social issues. This led to the Searchlight series, a precursor of World in Action, on which Elliott worked as a researcher.

His grandson, Ben Summerskill, is a former chief executive of Stonewall, the LGBT equality organisation.

Media offices
Preceded by J. Crawley	Editor of Reynold's News; 1929–1941	Succeeded by Bill Richardson
Preceded by Michael Foot	Editor of the Evening Standard; 1943–1945	Succeeded by Bert Gunn
Preceded by Percy Cudlipp	Editor of the Daily Herald; 1953–1957	Succeeded by Douglas Machray
