= Richard Symonds (academic) =

English academic and civil servant

Richard Symonds (2 October 1918 – 15 July 2006) was an English academic and civil servant.

He was born in Oxford, the son of neurologist Sir Charles Symonds and Janet Poulton. He was educated at Cothill House and Rugby School and gained a scholarship to Corpus Christi College, Oxford. When an undergraduate he went to Spain with Edward Heath and a few other undergraduates during the Spanish Civil War and experienced air raids there. After leaving Oxford University he joined the Friends' Ambulance and drove ambulances during the London blitz. He was also in charge of the above-ground air-raid shelters.

When the Japanese were threatening India with air raids, he was sent by the Friends' Ambulance to advise because of the expertise he had already gained.

In 1947, Symonds returned to India to work with Partition refugees. After contracting typhoid, he was brought, at the insistence of Mahatma Gandhi, to Birla House in New Delhi, where he spend several weeks recuperating under Gandhi's care.

Richard Symonds served in the United Nations and was Resident Representative in various countries including Sri Lanka (then Ceylon), Greece, Yugoslavia and Tunisia.

After a period as a professorial fellow at Sussex University, he returned to Oxford and to Queen Elizabeth House. He became a senior associate member of St Antony's College. He set up the United Nations Career Records Project, based at St Antony's. It was later taken over by the Bodleian Library.

Symonds was the author of many books. His first was The Making of Pakistan published by Faber and Faber and was a best-seller. His last book was In the Margins of Independence, a semi-autographical account of his life as a relief worker on the Indian continent.

Symonds was married three times; firstly to Anne Harrisson (marriage dissolved 1948); secondly to Juanita Ellington (died 1979); thirdly to Ann Hazel Spokes.
