= George Slocombe =

British journalist and novelist

George Edward Slocombe (March 8, 1894-December 19, 1963) was a British journalist and novelist.

== Biography ==
Slocombe was born in Bristol. He started work as a journalist for the Daily Herald in 1912 and became the paper's Chief Foreign Correspondent in 1919. He was recruited to work at the paper by Rowland Kenney, starting his career as Kenney's secretary. Slocombe interviewed Benito Mussolini at the Cannes Conference in 1922. Slocombe later wrote a fictionalized depiction of Mussolini in his novel, Romance of a Dictator.

In Paris, Slocombe worked for William Ewer at the Federated Press of America. In this position, Slocombe sent Ewer confidential copies of French reports sent to the French Foreign Office. Ewer paid him $1000 a month for supplying the documents. Slocombe was never prosecuted by the British government for these activities and he returned to England in 1940.

== Personal life ==
In 1921, while living in Paris, he had an affair with Edna St. Vincent Millay. Slocombe was the father of cinematographer Douglas Slocombe.

== Bibliography ==
- Romance of a Dictator (Boston: Houghton Mifflin, 1932)
- Don John of Austria, the Victor of Lepanto (1547-1578) (Boston: Houghton Mifflin, 1936)
- William the Conqueror (London: Hutchinson, 1959)
- The Dangerous Sea: The Mediterranean and Its Future (New York : Macmillan, 1937)
- Escape Into the Past: A Novel (London : George G. Harrap, 1943)
- Sons of the Conqueror (London : Hutchinson, 1960)
