= James Jarché =

English photojournalist (1890–1965)

- Born: 8 September 1890; Mile End, London, England
- Died: 6 August 1965 (aged 74); Hampstead, London, England
- Education: St Olave's Grammar School (expelled)
- Occupation: Press photographer
- Employers: Daily Sketch; Daily Herald; Daily Mail
- Spouse: Elsie Jezzard (m. 1914)
- Children: 1
- Relatives: Jack Suchet (son-in-law); John Suchet (grandson); David Suchet (grandson)

James Jarché (8 September 1890 – 6 August 1965) was a Fleet Street photographer notable for the first pictures of Edward VIII and the then-unidentified Wallis Simpson and also for his pictures of Louis Blériot (1909) and the Siege of Sidney Street.

== Early life ==
Jarché was born in Mile End, London, to Jewish parents Arnold Jarché (or Jarchy; died 1901) and Amelie (née Salomon). His father had a photographic business near Tower Bridge in London, but died when Jimmy was ten, leaving his wife and Jimmy to run the business. After an undistinguished school life (he was expelled from St Olave's Grammar School), he was world amateur wrestling middleweight champion in 1909.

In World War I, he stationed the rank of company sergeant-major with the 1st army corps school for physical training and bayonet training, serving in France.

He married Elsie Gladys Jezzard (1893–1971), of Epping, Essex on 18 August 1914. They lived with her parents, who ran the White Lion pub in that town.

== Career ==
He worked as a photographer for the Daily Sketch from 1912 to 1929, then worked at The Graphic and the Daily Herald.

He spent World War II as a British war correspondent for The Herald and the Weekly Illustrated and an official photographer for Life Magazine, in the Middle East. He visited Libya in 1941 and was in Burma in early 1942. He was in Berlin immediately after the end of the war.

Tasked with photographing the coronation of Queen Elizabeth II in black and white for Odhams Press, he reportedly also took colour photographs, which he sold independently, and was therefore sacked by Odhams. He then worked for the Daily Mail until his retirement in 1959.

== Legacy ==
His wartime negatives are at the Imperial War Museum, his Daily Herald glass negatives are at the National Science and Media Museum, Bradford, and some of his work is in the National Portrait Gallery. More of his negatives are in the Getty Images archive.

Perhaps his best remembered photograph shows the rear view of some small naked boys running from a policeman who had caught them swimming in The Serpentine in London's Hyde Park. A story he liked to tell concerned a visit he made to Chequers to photograph Winston Churchill. He was given a very large drink and taken for a walk in the garden. Walking just behind Churchill he found the drink too much so he tipped it into a pond they were passing. Unfortunately this made an audible splash. Without turning Churchill called out: 'Pour Mr Jarché another drink'.

Two of his grandchildren (his daughter was their mother) are the brothers, actor David Suchet and newsreader John Suchet. In his old age, he lived with his daughter and her sons, John, David and Peter. In March 2012 David presented a one-hour television documentary, in which John also appeared, about his grandfather, as part of the ITV series 'Perspectives'.

== Bibliography ==
- —— (1934). People I Have Shot.
