= Conservative Animal Welfare Foundation =

British animal welfare organization

- Abbreviation: CAWF
- Formation: 2016; 10 years ago
- Founders: Lorraine Platt and Chris Platt
- Purpose: Animal welfare
- Headquarters: Third Floor, 207 Regent Street, London, United Kingdom
- Website: www.conservativeanimalwelfarefoundation.org

The Conservative Animal Welfare Foundation (CAWF) is an influential animal welfare organisation in the United Kingdom. According to The Daily Telegraph, "it is one of the most powerful lobbying groups in the Tory Party."

Its patrons have included Conservative Party politicians such as David Amess, Zac Goldsmith, Carrie Johnson, Stanley Johnson, Dominic Raab, Henry Smith, and Theresa Villiers. It organised a World Animal Day event at the 2021 Conservative Party Conference.

== History ==
The organisation was founded in 2016 by Lorraine Platt and her husband Chris Platt from Surrey. A lifelong Conservative, Lorraine Platt decided to start the CAWF when she and her husband were campaigning in their constituency of Esher and Walton, and some residents said that they would not vote for the Conservative Party because local MP Ian Taylor supported fox hunting. Platt wanted to counter the perception that conservatives don't care about animals and to give voice to a conservative pro-animal-welfare perspective in Parliament. Though the CAWF began as just a website, it has grown with support from MPs and has had an impact on bills in Parliament.

However, support for the organisation within the Conservative Party has not been universal: Patrick McLoughlin wrote a letter asking the CAWF to stop using the Conservative Party logo. A Conservative Party spokesperson said that the organisation was not affiliated with the party, but CAWF patron Suzy Gale, wife of Conservative MP Roger Gale, said that the organisation and the party did have ties. Lorraine Platt said that the organisation was "voluntarily redesigning its logo".

== Positions ==
The organisation lobbies Parliament to improve animal welfare protections. Its areas of focus have expanded from fox hunting to a variety of other issues such as live exports, gestation crates, and cage-free eggs. Other concerns include foie gras and trophy hunting.

In 2021, the CAWF argued that the Animal Welfare (Sentience) Bill should include invertebrates such as lobsters and octopuses. The CAWF published a report estimating the quantity of invertebrates killed by UK fishing boats. The report said that discussions about animal welfare often fail to take into account invertebrates' sentience because of an "anthropocentric view [that] fails to capture what it means for an animal to be sentient". Lorraine Platt described octopuses as "highly intelligent, sentient animals" and said that the foundation hoped that people would choose not to eat them.

The organisation has also supported reforms for more humane slaughter. Along with the British Veterinary Association, it has argued for "an end to slaughter without stunning", and it published a report finding that the UK supply of meat from animals killed without stunning is greater than demanded by consumers. The CAWF has also argued that legal protections for farmed animals should apply to farmed fish, and it has worked to make fish slaughter more humane.

== Selected publications ==
- Manandhar-Richardson, Thomas; Christopher, Bryant (2024). The Hidden Harms of Factory Farms: How They Cost Taxpayers Millions (PDF). Conservative Animal Welfare Foundation.

== See also ==
- Animal Welfare Party
