= Aiguilles de Baulmes =

Mountain in Switzerland

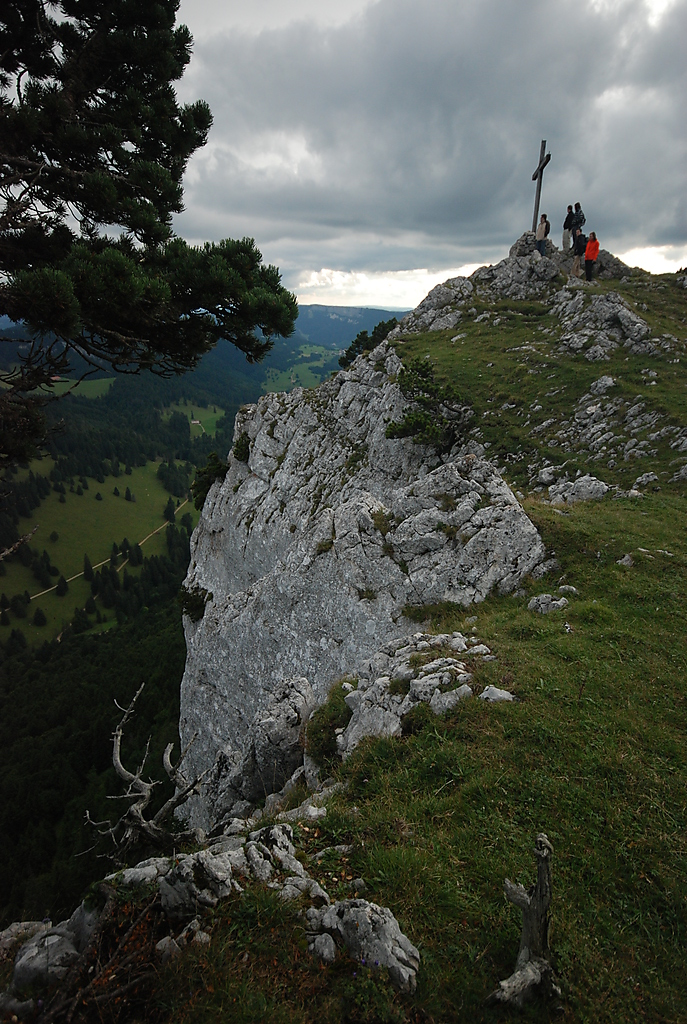
- The summit

Highest point
- Elevation: 1,559 m (5,115 ft)
- Prominence: 280 m (920 ft)
- Parent peak: Le Suchet
- Coordinates: 46°47′28.5″N 6°28′20″E

Geography
- Location within Switzerland
- Location: Vaud, Switzerland
- Parent range: Jura Mountains

Climbing
- Easiest route: Trail

The Aiguilles de Baulmes (1,559 m) are a mountain of the Jura range, located north of Baulmes in the canton of Vaud.
