= Bill Richardson (journalist) =

British newspaper editor and journalist

Sir Bill Richardson
- Born: William Robert Richardson; 16 January 1909; Newcastle-upon-Tyne, England
- Died: 16 January 1986 (aged 77)
- Education: Co-operative College
- Occupation: Newspaper editor
- Employer: Co-operative Press
- Movement: Co-operative
- Spouse: Gladys Gillians (m. 1932)

Sir William Robert Richardson (16 January 1909 – 16 January 1986) was a British newspaper editor.

Born in Newcastle-upon-Tyne, at the age of 14, Richardson began working for the Co-operative News, serving as editor of the paper from 1937 to 1942. In 1936, he became a sub-editor of Reynold's News, becoming editor in 1942 and serving until the paper's closure in 1967. He later served on the Post Office Users National Council, and he wrote several books about trade unionism and the co-operative movement.

== Books ==
- A Union of Many Trades: A History of USDAW
- The CWS in War and Peace
- The People's Business: A History Of Brighton Co-operative Society

Media offices
Preceded by Sydney Elliott	Editor of Reynold's News; 1941–1967	Succeeded by Position abolished
