= Francis Williams, Baron Francis-Williams =

British newspaper editor, political advisor and author

The Right Honourable The Lord Francis-Williams CBE

Downing Street Press Secretary
- In office 1945–1947
- Prime Minister: Clement Attlee
- Preceded by: Position established
- Succeeded by: Philip Jordan

Personal details
- Born: Edward Francis Williams; 10 March 1903 St Martin's, Shropshire, England
- Died: 5 June 1970 (aged 67)
- Education: Queen Elizabeth's Grammar School, Middleton

Edward Francis Williams, Baron Francis-Williams CBE (10 March 1903 – 5 June 1970), known as Frank Williams, was a British newspaper editor, political advisor and author.

== Early life ==
Born in St Martin's, Shropshire, Williams studied at Queen Elizabeth's Grammar School, Middleton, before entering journalism. He worked on the Bootle Times and then the Liverpool Courier, and was convinced of socialism by the conditions he saw. He moved to London to take up a post as a financial journalist on the Evening Standard, but soon moved to the Daily Herald, a paper with views closer to his own.

== Breakout ==
=== Editor of the Daily Herald ===
In 1936, he accepted the editorship of the Daily Herald, serving until 1940.

=== Political involvement ===
In 1941, he became Controller of Press Censorship and News at the Ministry of Information, and for his work he was appointed a Commander of the Order of the British Empire (CBE) in 1945. He then became the public relations advisor to Labour Party Prime Minister Clement Attlee for two years, the first person to hold such a position. From 1951 to 1952, he was a governor of the BBC. On 13 April 1962 he was created a life peer as Baron Francis-Williams, of Abinger in the County of Surrey.

== Academia ==
=== Professorship ===
Williams served as Regents' Professor at the University of California, Berkeley, in 1961, and Kemper Knapp Visiting Professor at the University of Wisconsin from 1967 until his death.

=== Books ===
He wrote several books, including a biography of Ernest Bevin, and he co-authored Clement Attlee's autobiography. His The Triple Challenge: The Future of Socialist Britain (1948) explains the main Labour programs started under Attlee. or the UNESCO, he wrote Transmitting World News (1953). In 1957, Francis produced a history of the press, entitled Dangerous Estate, part of which was devoted to explaining the rise and fall in the circulation of newspapers.

Media offices
Preceded by W. H. Stevenson	Editor of the Daily Herald; 1936–1940	Succeeded by Percy Cudlipp
Government offices
Preceded by Office established	Downing Street Press Secretary; 1945-1947	Succeeded by Philip Jordan
