= John Beavan, Baron Ardwick =

British journalist (1910–1994)

The Right Honourable The Lord Ardwick

Member of the House of Lords Lord Temporal
- In office 16 January 1970 – 18 August 1994; Life Peerage

Member of the European Parliament
- In office 1975–1979

Personal details
- Born: John Cowburn Beavan; 9 April 1910 Manchester, England
- Died: 18 August 1994 (aged 84) London, England
- Party: Labour
- Spouse: Gladys Jones (m. 1934)
- Children: 2 (including Matthew Symonds)
- Relatives: Carrie Johnson (granddaughter)
- Education: Manchester Grammar School
- Occupation: Politician, editor, reporter

John Cowburn Beavan, Baron Ardwick (9 April 1910 – 18 August 1994) was a British journalist, Labour life peer and Member of the European Parliament. He began his journalistic career in local newspapers before a long associations with The Guardian and Mirror. He was a staunch Labour supporter and was appointed as a life peer by Harold Wilson in 1970, namely to represent journalism in the House of Lords.

== Early life and education ==
Beavan was born at Ardwick, in Manchester, on 9 April 1910, a son of Silas Morgan Beavan (1881–1964; of Welsh origin and a miner, later greengrocer) and Emily Esther (née Hussey; 1882–1972), who from 'humble origins' went on to serve as a Manchester City Councillor, alderman, and justice of the peace, and was a campaigner for women's rights. Beavan was educated at Manchester Grammar School.

== Career ==
Beavan's early career involved work at a number of newspapers, including the Manchester Evening Chronicle, the Blackpool Times, and the Evening Standard. In 1943, he became editor of the Manchester Evening News. Between 1946 and 1955, he was London editor of The Guardian. For two years, 1960 to 1962, he was editor of the Daily Herald, then becoming political advisor to the Mirror Group, a post he retained until 1976. He was a Labour Member of the European Parliament from 1975 to 1979.

On 16 January 1970, he was created a life peer as Baron Ardwick, of Barnes in the London Borough of Richmond upon Thames.

== Personal life ==
He married Gladys Jones in 1934, with whom he adopted a daughter. By Anne Symonds, a BBC World Service journalist, he was also the father of Matthew Symonds. Symonds' daughter Carrie is the spouse of the former Prime Minister of the United Kingdom Boris Johnson, a Conservative.

On 18 August 1994, Beavan died from cancer at Parkside Hospital in Wimbledon, London, at the age of 84.

== Arms ==
Coat of arms of John Beavan, Baron Ardwick
Coronet A Coronet of a Baron Crest A Cock criant standing upon a hand mirror Proper the frame and handle Or. Escutcheon Or a dragon passant between two roses Gules barbed and seeded proper in chief and in base on a pile reversed Gules an Owl Argent. Supporters On either side a representation of an angel holding in the superior hand a shepherd's crook Proper. Motto IN OMNIA PARATUS (Prepared In All Things)

Media offices
Preceded by Douglas Machray	Editor of the Daily Herald; 1960–1962	Succeeded by Sydney Jacobson
