= Reynold's News =

Newspaper in the United Kingdom (1850–1967)

- Founder: George William MacArthur Reynolds
- Founded: 5 May 1850
- Ceased publication: 18 June 1967

Reynold's News was a Sunday newspaper in the United Kingdom, founded as Reynolds's Weekly Newspaper by George W. M. Reynolds in 1850, who became its first editor. By 1870, the paper was selling more than 350,000 weekly copies. George died in 1879, and was succeeded as editor by his brother, Edward Reynolds.

After Edward's death in 1894, the paper was bought by Henry Dalziel and, in 1924, was retitled Reynold's Illustrated News. In 1929, the paper was acquired by the Co-operative Press, linked to the Co-operative Party, and, in 1936, its title was shortened to Reynold's News.

After the left-wing journalist H. N. Brailsford wrote a series of articles in Reynold's News critical of the Moscow show trials, the paper received hundreds of letters both supporting Brailsford and criticising him. In 1944, it was retitled again, this time as Reynold's News and Sunday Citizen. During the 1950s, it began to make a loss, and was relaunched in 1962 as a tabloid, the Sunday Citizen, but the final issue was published on 18 June 1967.

== Editors ==
1850: George W. M. Reynolds
1879: Edward Reynolds
1894: William Thompson
1907: Henry Dalziel
1920: John Crawley
1929: Sydney Elliott
1941: Bill Richardson

In 1949, Terence Robertson joined the paper as News Editor. Robertson led a colourful private life and was involved in the fatal car crash that killed Vickie Martin, a protégée of Stephen Ward, in 1955. He later wrote several successful books before emigrating to Canada. He apparently committed suicide in 1970 while working on a book about the Bronfman family.

== Sources ==
- David Butler and Jennie Freeman, British Political Facts, 1900-1967, p. 281
