= Sydney Jacobson, Baron Jacobson =

British peer

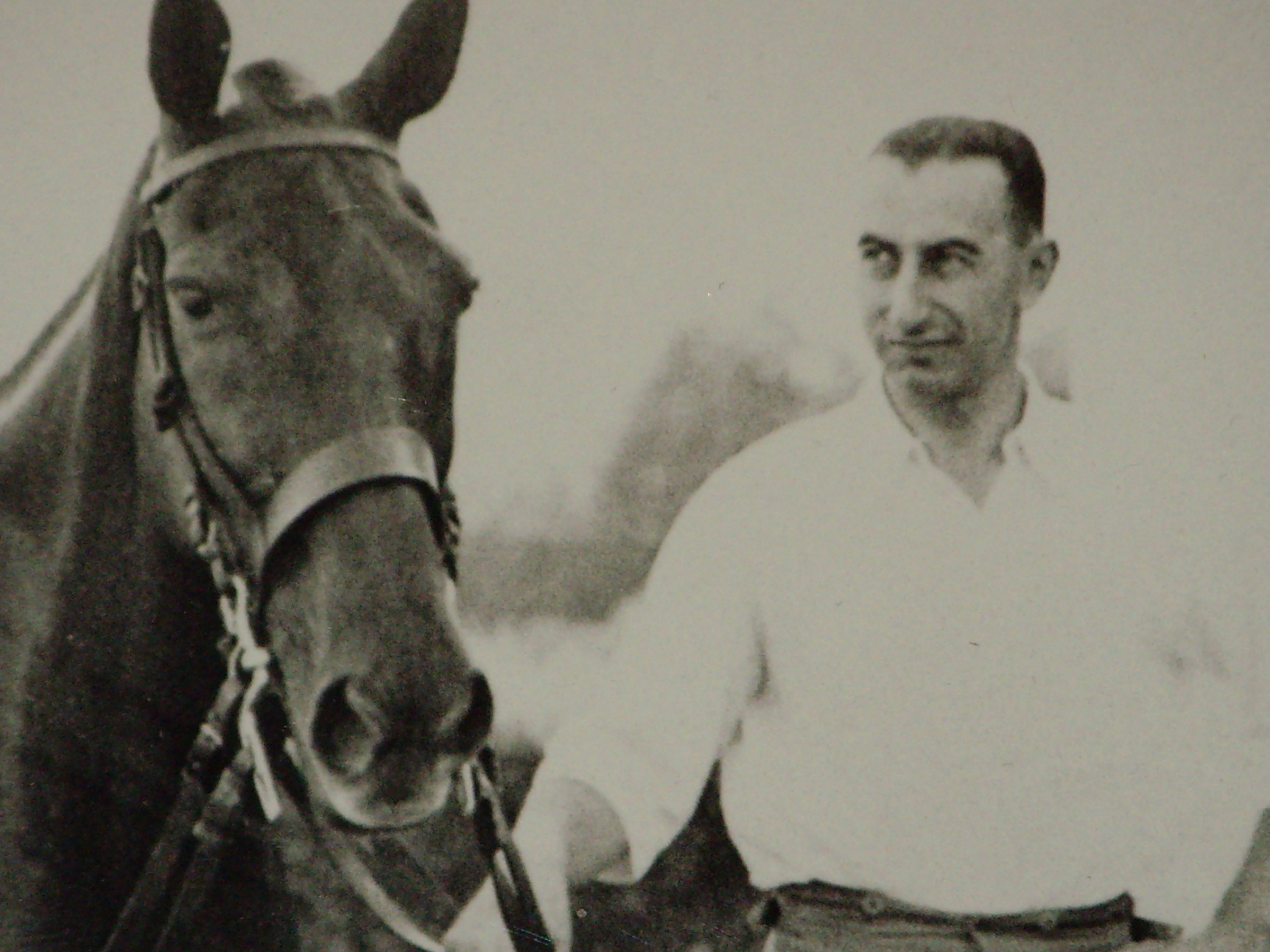
Family archive image of Sydney Jacobson from 1930s

Sydney Jacobson, Baron Jacobson MC, (26 October 1908, Zeerust, Transvaal – 13 August 1988, St Albans, Hertfordshire) was a British journalist, editor and political commentator.

== Early years ==
Jacobson was the only son and elder child of Samuel and Anna Jacobson, a Jewish couple originally from Germany who ran an ostrich farm. In 1914 the family returned to Frankfurt am Main for a holiday. They were interned on the outbreak of World War I. His father was drowned when the ship in which he was trying to return to South Africa sank. The family went to live in Wales with relatives, the family of Lewis Silkin.

Jacobson and his mother subsequently moved to London where he attended Strand School and studied journalism at King's College London. He started out on local newspapers but by 1934 was assistant editor of The Statesman newspaper in Calcutta. On his return to England he became assistant editor of the pocket-sized literary and humour magazine Lilliput in October 1937.

== Wartime years ==
During World War II Jacobson served with the Middlesex Regiment (Duke of Cambridge's Own) and rose to the rank of major. He was awarded the Military Cross in 1944 in recognition of his exemplary gallantry.

== Journalism ==
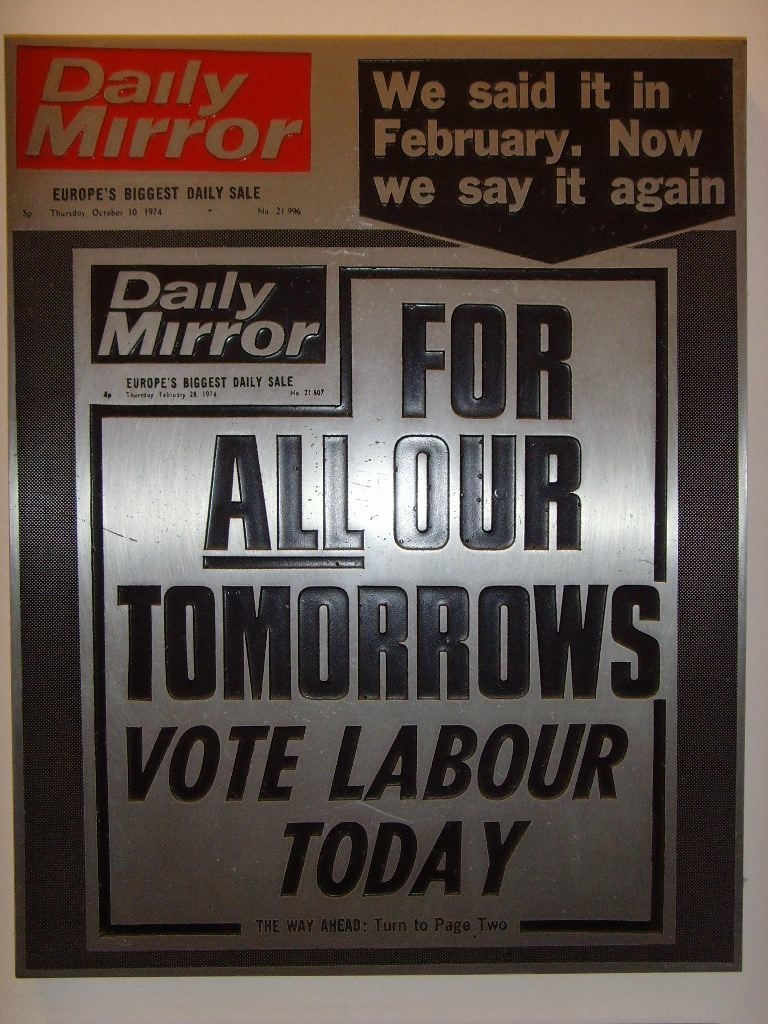
Metal printing plate from the election-issue Daily Mirror of 10 October 1974

After the war he returned to journalism and worked as a feature writer on the pioneering photojournalistic magazine Picture Post under its influential editor Tom Hopkinson. He went on to work as political editor of the Daily Mirror for 10 years before becoming editor of the Daily Herald and its replacement The Sun; he was appointed editorial director of the International Publishing Corporation (IPC) in 1965.

By 1974 Jacobson was deputy chairman of IPC working under his friend and colleague of many years Hugh Cudlipp. During one of the two General Elections that year Jacobson was responsible for at least two of the Daily Mirror's best-known front pages – one bore nothing but a photograph of the then Prime Minister Edward Heath and the words, "AND NOW HE HAS THE NERVE TO ASK FOR A VOTE OF CONFIDENCE." The other read, "FOR ALL OUR TOMORROWS VOTE LABOUR TODAY."

== Latter years ==
On 16 July 1975, Jacobson was made a life peer as Baron Jacobson of St Albans in Hertfordshire. (The Times newspaper reports that he had previously declined a knighthood in 1968.) He retired from journalism the same year.

Sydney Jacobson died in August 1988. He was survived by his wife, June, their daughter Ruth and sons Colin and Philip, also a journalist. At a thanksgiving service at the "journalists' church" St Bride's off of Fleet Street in London Hugh Cudlipp used his address to launch an attack on the state of British tabloid newspapers.

Media offices
Preceded by John Beavan	Editor of the Daily Herald; 1962–1964	Succeeded by Position abolished
Preceded by New position	Editor of The Sun; 1964–1965	Succeeded by Dick Dinsdale
