= Matthew Symonds =

British journalist (born 1953)

- Born: Matthew John Symonds; 20 December 1953 (age 72)
- Occupation: Journalist
- Known for: Co-founder of The Independent
- Children: 4
- Parents: John Beavan, Baron Ardwick (father); Anne Symonds (mother)

Matthew John Symonds (born 20 December 1953) is a British journalist and a co-founder of The Independent.

Born in 1953, Symonds is the son of John Beavan, who at the time was London editor of The Guardian, and BBC World Service broadcaster Anne Symonds. He worked for the Mirror group, the Financial Times, and The Daily Telegraph, which he joined in November 1981 as economics leader writer, before in 1986 becoming a co-founder of The Independent, with Andreas Whittam Smith and Stephen Glover. The three had worked together at The Daily Telegraph and had all left the newspaper towards the end of Lord Hartwell's ownership of it.

After leaving The Independent, Symonds was appointed as strategy director of BBC World Service Television, then from 1996 to 2018 was on the staff of The Economist. While there, he received the Wincott Prize for financial journalism in 1998, and went on to serve as the magazine's political editor and technology editor, before his last job for it, as defence and diplomatic editor. He was the Executive Director of the Larry Ellison Foundation from 2018 to 2021. He continues to contribute articles to The Economist.

Symonds said of himself in 1996 that he was an economic liberal, believing in the market, but also in individual liberty and freedom. He wrote that "...the only way in which you can find efficient and humane solutions to problems is to give people as much information and as much power over their own lives as possible."

Symonds has a wife Alison, with whom he has three children.

In 1988, he had another daughter, Carrie Symonds, with Josephine McAfee, a lawyer at The Independent. Their daughter is married to the former British Prime Minister Boris Johnson.

== Selected publication ==
- Softwar: an intimate portrait of Larry Ellison and Oracle (Simon & Schuster, 2003, ISBN 978-0743225052)
