= Percy Cudlipp =

Welsh journalist (1905–1962)

Percy Cudlipp (10 November 1905 – 5 November 1962) was a prominent Welsh journalist and editor of the Evening Standard, The Daily Herald, and the New Scientist.

== Biography ==
Percy Cudlipp was born at 180 Arabella Street, Cardiff, the son of a travelling salesman, and was the brother of Hugh Cudlipp (later Baron Cudlipp) and Reginald Cudlipp, both notable journalists. The eldest of the three, Percy was described by Douglas Jay as the most serious-minded. All three were educated at the Gladstone Primary School and Howard Gardens High School, Cardiff. Percy Cudlipp began his journalistic career as a messenger boy for the South Wales Echo, later training as a reporter, and in 1924 became a columnist for the Evening Chronicle in Manchester. In 1925 he began working as a drama critic and columnist on London's Sunday News. In 1927 he married Gwendoline James, and they had one son.

Cudlipp had a sideline in writing light verse and lyrics. He became editor of the Evening Standard, then owned by Max Aitken, 1st Baron Beaverbrook, in 1933, aged 27, and was at one time the youngest editor in Fleet Street. As a socialist, Cudlipp was suspicious of the Fascist movement in Germany and encouraged a campaign against them. He moved on to become editor of the Daily Herald in 1940.

In 1953, Cudlipp unexpectedly resigned the editorship of the Daily Herald, an action that has been attributed to the ongoing conflicts between the paper's management and the trade union movement and the difficulty of retaining editorial control. In the following years he was a columnist for the News Chronicle. He was subsequently approached by the team, including scientist Tom Margerison, who hoped to set up the New Scientist and, despite claiming to know nothing about science, became the first editor of the new magazine, which was launched in November 1956. He was a frequent radio broadcaster, contributing to quiz shows and news programmes on the BBC World Service.

He died suddenly, at his home, 11 Falmouth House, Clarendon Place, London, just short of his 57th birthday, while still employed as editor of the New Scientist.

Media offices
Preceded by George Gilliat	Editor of the Evening Standard; 1933–1938	Succeeded by Frank Owen
Preceded by Francis Williams	Editor of the Daily Herald; 1940–1953	Succeeded by Sydney Elliott
