= David Suchet =

English actor (born 1946)

Sir David Suchet CBE
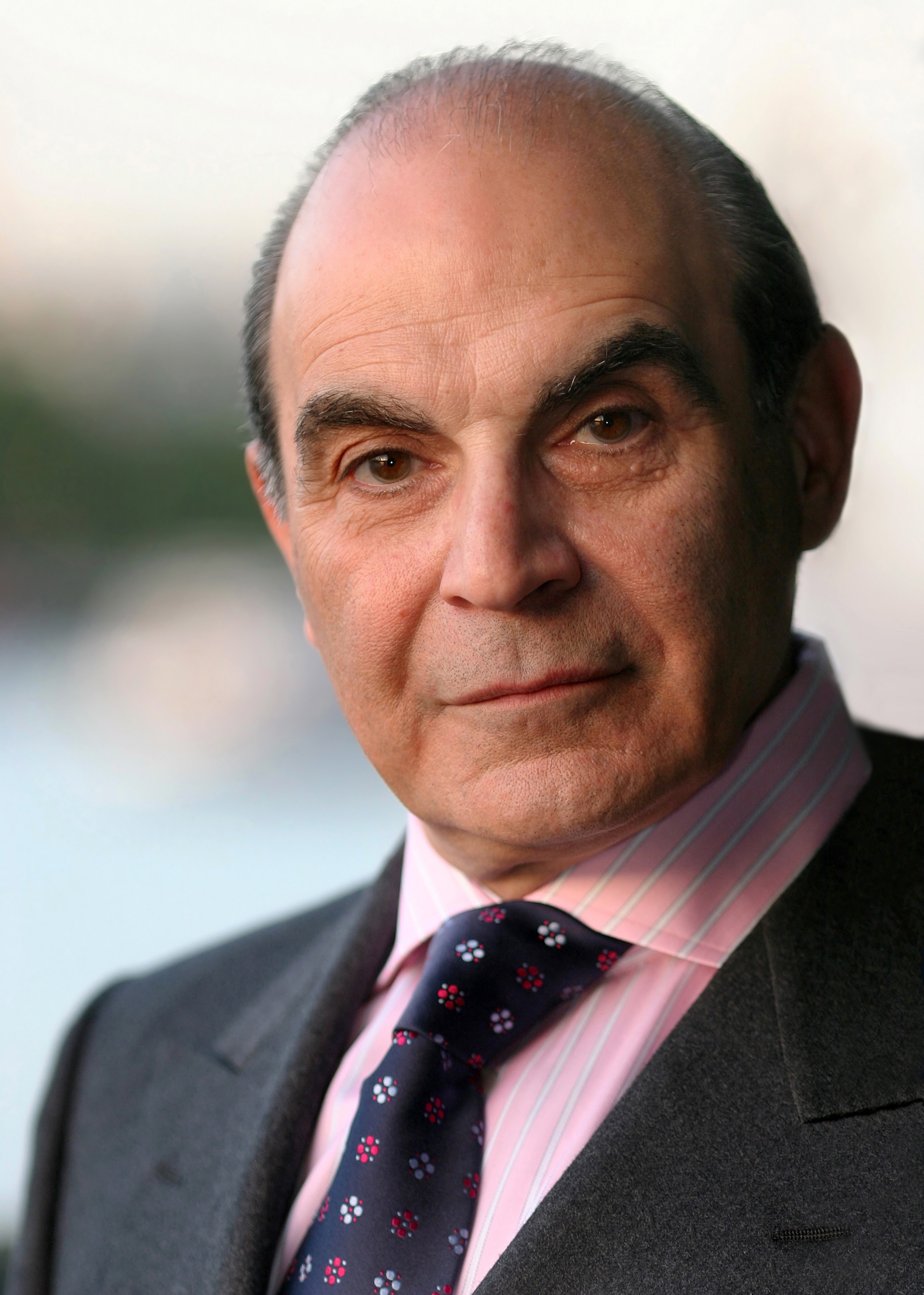
- Suchet in 2006
- Born: David Courtney Suchet; 2 May 1946 (age 80); Paddington, London, England
- Education: London Academy of Music and Dramatic Art
- Occupation: Actor
- Years active: 1969–present
- Spouse: Sheila Ferris (m. 1976)
- Children: 2
- Father: Jack Suchet
- Relatives: John Suchet (brother); James Jarché (grandfather)
- David Suchet's voice Recorded February 2009 from the BBC Radio 4 programme Desert Island Discs

Sir David Courtney Suchet (/ˈsuːʃeɪ/ SOO-shay; born 2 May 1946) is an English actor, known for his work on stage and in television. He portrayed Edward Teller in the television series Oppenheimer (1980) and received the RTS and BPG awards for his performance as Augustus Melmotte in the British serial The Way We Live Now (2001). International acclaim and recognition followed his performance as detective Hercule Poirot in Agatha Christie's Poirot (1989–2013), for which he received a 1991 British Academy Television Award for Best Actor nomination.

As a stage actor, Suchet has been nominated for nine Olivier Awards and a Tony Award.

== Early life and family ==
David Suchet was born on 2 May 1946 in the Paddington area of London, the son of Jack Suchet and his wife Joan Patricia (née Jarché; 1916–1992), an actress. Jack emigrated from South Africa to England in 1932, trained to be a physician at St Mary's Hospital Medical School, London, in 1933, and became an obstetrician and gynaecologist.

Suchet's father was of Lithuanian-Jewish descent, the son of Izidor Suchedowitz, originally from Kretinga in the Pale of Settlement of the Russian Empire. At some point, the family name was recorded as "Schohet", a Yiddish word, from Hebrew shohet, defining the profession of kosher butcher. Suchet's father changed his surname to Suchet while living in South Africa. David's mother was born in England and was Anglican. She was of Russian-Jewish descent on her father's side, and English Anglican on her mother's side.

He was raised without religion, but became a practising Anglican in 1986, and was confirmed in 2006.

Suchet and his brothers, John and Peter, attended Grenham House boarding school in Birchington-on-Sea, Kent. Then, after attending another independent school, Wellington School in Somerset, he took an interest in acting and joined the National Youth Theatre at the age of 16. He trained and graduated from the London Academy of Music and Dramatic Art, where he later became a vice president, retiring in 2018.

== Career ==
=== Theatre ===
Suchet began his acting career at the Gateway Theatre, Chester in 1969. He then appeared in many reps, including Worthing, Birmingham, Belgrade Theatre, Coventry, Liverpool Playhouse, and the Watermill Theatre. In 1973, he joined the Royal Shakespeare Company. From 1981 to 1982, he played Bolingbroke in Richard II opposite Alan Howard. In 1993 he played "John" in the drama Oleanna at the Royal Court Theatre. It was directed by Harold Pinter, and co-starred Lia Williams as "Carol".

He made his West End debut opposite Saskia Reeves in the Kempinski play Separation, at the Comedy Theatre in 1987. From 1996 to 1997 he played opposite Dame Diana Rigg in the West End production of Who's Afraid of Virginia Woolf?. He was featured as Salieri from 1998 to 2000 in the Broadway production Amadeus. In 2007, at the Chichester Festival Theatre, he played Cardinal Benelli in The Last Confession, about the death of Pope John Paul I. In 2014, he reprised the role of Benelli in the Australian tour of the play.

He has been starring as Lady Bracknell in The Importance of Being Earnest by Oscar Wilde at the Vaudeville Theatre in London since June 2015 and on tour. In January 2022, Suchet had a three-week residency at the Harold Pinter Theatre performing Poirot and More, A Retrospective.

=== Television and film ===
In 1985, he played Inspector Japp in the Hercule Poirot television film Thirteen at Dinner, which starred Peter Ustinov as the main character that Suchet later played from 1989 to 2013 in the Agatha Christie's Poirot television series.

In 1985, Suchet starred in the TV film A Song For Europe, in the role of Steven Dyer, a fictionalised portrayal of corporate whistleblower Stanley Adams.

In 1985, Suchet played Blott in Blott on the Landscape.

In 1988, Suchet played Leopold Bloom in the Channel 4 documentary The Modern World: Ten Great Writers, in which some of James Joyce's Ulysses was dramatised. The same year, Suchet appeared as scheming adulterer Yves Drouard in A Time to Die, the penultimate episode of television series Tales of the Unexpected.

In 1989, he took the title role of Hercule Poirot for the long-running television series Agatha Christie's Poirot. In his book, Poirot and Me, Suchet mentions that prior Poirot actor Peter Ustinov one day approached him and told him that he, Suchet, could play Poirot and would be good at it. Suchet then spoke to Brian Eastman from ITV, who sent him some of the novels to read. "And as I did so, it slowly dawned on me that I'd never actually seen the character I was reading about on the screen...He was quite, quite different: more elusive, more pedantic and, most of all, more human than the person I'd seen on the screen."

Still unsure, Suchet rang his brother John, who advised him against it, calling Poirot "a bit of a joke, a buffoon. It's not you at all." Suchet took his brother's advice as a challenge and accepted the role. In preparation, he wrote a five-page character study of Poirot detailing 93 different aspects of his life. Suchet said he took the list on set with him and "gave a copy to every director I worked with on a Poirot film." Suchet went on to play the role in adaptations of every novel and short story featuring the character written by Agatha Christie. In preparation for the role, he says that he read every novel and short story and compiled an extensive file on Poirot.

In 2001, he had the lead role in the David Yates-directed BBC television serial The Way We Live Now. In April 2002, he played the real-life barrister George Carman in the BBC drama Get Carman: The Trials of George Carman QC.

In 2003, Suchet starred as the ambitious Cardinal Wolsey in the two-part ITV drama Henry VIII opposite Ray Winstone as Henry VIII and Helena Bonham Carter as Anne Boleyn. In May 2006, he played the role of the fallen press baron Robert Maxwell in Maxwell, a BBC2 dramatisation of the final 18 months of Maxwell's life. In 2006, he voiced Poirot in the adventure game Agatha Christie: Murder on the Orient Express.

At Christmas 2006, he played the vampire hunter Abraham Van Helsing in a BBC adaptation of Bram Stoker's novel Dracula. He appeared in the disaster film Flood, released in August 2007, as the Deputy Prime Minister of the United Kingdom, at a time when London is devastated by flooding. Suchet appeared on daytime-TV chat show Loose Women on 6 February 2008 to talk about his film The Bank Job, in which he played Lew Vogel, alongside Jason Statham and Saffron Burrows. In 2008, he took part in the genealogy documentary series Who Do You Think You Are?.

He starred in the 2009 CBC made-for-TV film Diverted. He starred as the main antagonist, Reacher Gilt, in the 2010 Sky TV adaptation of Going Postal, based on Pratchett's book of the same name. He appeared in the film Act of God as Benjamin Cisco. In 1987, Suchet played a bigfoot hunter in Harry and the Hendersons. He had roles in two Michael Douglas films, A Perfect Murder and The In-Laws. In 1997, he starred in the independent film Sunday.

Between 2014 and 2015, Suchet appeared in and narrated two BBC Television documentaries, undertaking an epic journey spanning the Mediterranean, inspired by the life and travels of the apostles St. Peter and St. Paul.

In 2016, Suchet took on the role of the narrator in the BBC live production of Peter Pan Goes Wrong, where he serves as the sole "professional" among the cast. At one point during the broadcast, when one of the actors, Annie (who is playing Tinker Bell), is electrocuted, he is asked to distract the audience. His solution is to take Captain Hook's moustache and start acting like Poirot, even delivering his lines in a Belgian accent. This prompts the director, Chris Bean (who is also playing Captain Hook), to retrieve the moustache and dismiss Suchet.

In 2017, Suchet starred as Dr Fagan in the BBC One adaptation of Evelyn Waugh's Decline and Fall, and guest starred in the role of a character called "The Landlord", for an episode of the tenth series of Doctor Who entitled Knock Knock.

He was the presenter for the documentary Travels with Agatha Christie & David Suchet and in 2026 he was the presenter for another documentary Mysteries on the Nile with Sir David Suchet.

== Canal Trust and River Thames Alliance ==
After starting work at Stratford-on-Avon in 1973, Suchet had a narrowboat named Prima Donna fitted out to his specification as a residence there. He later became vice-president of the Lichfield and Hatherton Canals Trust, whose most challenging achievement has been securing funding, via an appeal and from influencing government decisions, concerning the building of the new M6 Toll motorway, where it cuts the lines of the Lichfield Canal and the Hatherton Canal, both of which the Trust wishes to see reopened.

He was voted in as chairman of the River Thames Alliance in November 2005. At the July 2006 Annual General Meeting of the River Thames Alliance, he agreed to continue being chairman for another year. He is a patron of the River Thames Boat Project.

== Awards, honours and appointments ==
In 2002, he was appointed Officer of the Order of the British Empire (OBE). In October 2008, Suchet was awarded an honorary degree for his contributions to the Arts, from the University of Chichester. This was presented by the Vice-Chancellor at the Chichester Festival Theatre.

On 7 January 2009, he was awarded Freedom of the City of London, at the Guildhall in London. In July 2010, David Suchet was awarded an honorary degree from the University of Kent at Canterbury Cathedral in Canterbury. He was appointed Commander of the Order of the British Empire (CBE) in the 2011 New Year Honours for "services to drama". On 18 March 2014, Suchet was given a Lifetime Achievement Award at the RTS Programme Awards 2013 for his outstanding performance in Agatha Christie's Poirot. Suchet is Honorary President of The Leica Society.

Suchet was knighted in the 2020 Birthday Honours for services to drama and charity.

Year	Awards	Category	Nominated work	Result	Ref.
1979	Laurence Olivier Awards	Best Actor in a Supporting Role	Once in a Lifetime	Nominated	
1981	Laurence Olivier Awards	Actor of the Year in a Revival	The Merchant of Venice	Nominated	
1986	Royal Television Society Programme Awards	Best Actor	Blott on the Landscape / A Song for Europe / Freud	Won	
1988	Laurence Olivier Awards	Actor of the Year in a New Play	Separation	Nominated	
1989	British Academy Film Awards	Best Actor in a Supporting Role	A World Apart	Nominated	
1991	British Academy Television Awards	Best Actor	Agatha Christie's Poirot	Nominated	
1994	Laurence Olivier Awards	Best Actor	Oleanna	Nominated	
1994	Variety Club Awards	Best Actor	Oleanna	Won	
1997	Laurence Olivier Awards	Best Actor	Who's Afraid of Virginia Woolf?	Nominated	
1999	Laurence Olivier Awards	Best Actor	Amadeus	Nominated	
1999	Variety Club Award	Best Actor	Amadeus	Won	
2000	Tony Awards	Best Actor in a Play	Amadeus	Nominated	
2002	British Academy Television Awards	Best Actor	The Way We Live Now	Nominated	
2002	Royal Television Society Programme Awards	Best Actor	The Way We Live Now	Won	
2008	International Emmy Awards	Best Actor	Maxwell	Won	
2011	Laurence Olivier Awards	Best Actor	All My Sons	Nominated	
2014	Royal Television Society Programme Awards	Lifetime Achievement Award		Won	
2016	Laurence Olivier Awards	Best Actor in a Supporting Role	The Importance of Being Earnest	Nominated	
2019	Laurence Olivier Awards	Best Actor	The Price	Nominated	

== Personal life ==
=== Family and genealogy ===
In 1972, Suchet first met his wife, Sheila Ferris, at the Belgrade Theatre, Coventry, where they were both working; he says that he fell in love with her as soon as he saw her, and that it took a while to persuade her to go out for a meal with him. They were married on 30 June 1976; the couple have a son and daughter.

Suchet is the brother of John Suchet, a former national news presenter for Five News, and former ITN newscaster, and presenter of the evening concert on Classic FM (2020).

Suchet's maternal grandfather, James Jarché, was a famous Fleet Street photographer notable for the first pictures of Edward VIII and Wallis Simpson and also for his pictures of Louis Blériot (1909) and the Siege of Sidney Street. Suchet first became interested in photography when his grandfather gave him a Leica M3 camera as a present. The Jarché family was originally named Jarchy, and were Russian Jews.

Suchet's great-great-great-grandfather, George Jezzard, was a master mariner. He was captain of the brig Hannah, which sank nine miles off the coast of Suffolk during a violent storm on 28 May 1860, in which more than 100 vessels sank and at least 40 people died. Jezzard and six others of his crew were saved by local rescuers just before their ship sank.

=== Religious beliefs ===
Raised without religion, in 1986 Suchet underwent a religious conversion after having read Romans 8 in his hotel room. Soon afterwards, he was baptised into the Church of England. Suchet stated in an interview with Strand Magazine: "I'm a Christian by faith. I like to think it sees me through a great deal of my life. I very much believe in the principles of Christianity and the principles of most religions, actually—that one has to abandon oneself to a higher good."

In 2012, Suchet made a documentary for the BBC on his personal hero, Saint Paul, to discover what he was like as a man by charting his evangelistic journey around the Mediterranean. In 2014, he filmed a documentary about the apostle Saint Peter.

In November 2012, the British Bible Society appointed David Suchet and Dr Paula Gooder as new vice-presidents. They joined the existing vice-presidents: John Sentamu (Archbishop of York), Vincent Nichols (Archbishop of Westminster), Barry Morgan (Archbishop of Wales), David F. Ford (Regius Professor of Divinity at Cambridge), Joel Edwards (International Director of Micah Challenge) and Lord Alton of Liverpool. Following the time when he bade farewell to his role as Hercule Poirot, Suchet fulfilled a 27-year ambition to make an audio recording of The Bible's New International Version, which was released in April 2014.

=== Political views ===
In August 2014, Suchet was one of 200 public figures who were signatories to a letter to The Guardian expressing their hope that Scotland would vote to remain part of the United Kingdom in the September 2014 referendum on that issue.

== Acting credits ==
=== Film ===
Year	Title	Role	Other notes
1971	The Taming of the Shrew: An Introduction	Unknown	
1971	Henry IV, Part 2: An Introduction	Unknown	
1980	Schiele in Prison	Gustav Klimt	
1982	The Missionary	Corbett	
1983	Trenchcoat	Inspector Stagnos	
1984	Greystoke: The Legend of Tarzan, Lord of the Apes	Buller	
1984	The Little Drummer Girl	Mesterbein	
1985	The Falcon and the Snowman	Alex	
1985	A Song for Europe	Steven Dyer	
1986	Iron Eagle	Minister of Defense Colonel Akir Nakesh	
1987	Harry and the Hendersons	Jacques LaFleur	
1988	A World Apart	Muller	
1988	To Kill a Priest	Bishop	
1989	When the Whales Came	Will	
1993	The Lucona Affair	Rudi Waltz	
1996	Executive Decision	Nagi Hassan / Altar	
1997	Sunday	Oliver / Matthew Delacorta	
1998	A Perfect Murder	Detective Mohamed Karaman	
1999	Wing Commander	Captain Jason Sansky	
2000	Sabotage!	Napoleon	
2002	Pinocchio	Geppetto / Judge	English version, Voice
2003	The In-Laws	Jean-Pierre Thibodoux	
2003	Foolproof	Leo Gillette	
2004	Space Odyssey: Voyage to the Planets	The Narrator	TV movie, Voice
2006	Flushed Away	Rita's Dad	Voice
2006	Arthur and the Invisibles	The Narrator	English version, Voice
2007	Flood	Deputy Prime Minister Campbell	
2007	Maxwell	Robert Maxwell	
2008	The Bank Job	Lew Vogel	
2009	Act of God	Dr. Benjamin Cisco	
2011	All My Sons	Joe Keller	
2014	Effie Gray	Mr. Ruskin	
2014	Long Day's Journey into Night	James Tyrone	
2015	The Importance of Being Earnest	Lady Bracknell	
2016	Near Myth: The Oskar Knight Story	Himself	
2017	American Assassin	CIA Director Stansfield	
2018	Dinner with Edward	Edward	

=== Television ===
Year	Title	Role	Other notes
1971	Public Eye	Martin Kulman	And When You've Paid the Bill You're None the Wiser'x
1973	The Protectors	Leo	Episode: "Fighting Fund"
1978	The Professionals	Krivas	Episode: "Where The Jungle Ends"
1980	A Tale of Two Cities	John Barsad	TV movie
1980	Oppenheimer	Edward Teller	6 episodes
1981	Play for Today	Reger	Episode: "The Cause"
1982	The Hunchback of Notre Dame	Clopin Trouillefou	TV movie
1983	The Last Day	Howard	TV movie
1983	Red Monarch	Beria	TV movie
1983	Being Normal	Bill	TV movie
1983	Reilly, Ace of Spies	Inspector Tsientsin	Episode: "Prelude to War"
1984	Master of the Game	André d'Usseau	3 episodes
1984	Freud	Dr. Sigmund Freud	6 episodes
1984	Oxbridge Blues	Colin	2 episodes
1985	Gulag	Matvei	TV movie
1985	Blott on the Landscape	Blott	6 episodes
1985	A Song for Europe	Steven Dyer	TV movie
1985	Thirteen at Dinner	Inspector Japp	TV movie
1985	Mussolini: The Untold Story	Dino Grandi	2 episodes
1986	Murrow	William L. Shirer	TV movie
1986	King and Castle	Devas	Episode: "Partners"
1987	The Last Innocent Man	Jonathan Gault	TV movie
1987	Cause Célèbre	T.J. O'Connor K.C.	TV movie
1988	Tales of the Unexpected	Yves Drouard	Episode: "A Time to Die"
1988	Once in a Life Time	Herman Glogauer	TV movie
1989–2013	Agatha Christie's Poirot	Hercule Poirot	13 series; 70 episodes
1990	The Play on One	Joe	Episode: "Separation"
1990	Theatre Night	William Shakespeare	Episode: "Scenes of Money and Death"
1992	Science Fiction	Roger Altounyan	Episode: "Sherlock Holmes and the Case of the Missing Link"
1992	The Secret Agent	Alfred Verloc	3 episodes
1995	Moses	Aaron	TV movie
1996	Cruel Train	Ruben Roberts	TV movie
1996	Screen Two	Vlachos	Episode: "Deadly Voyage"
1997	Solomon	Joab	TV movie
1997	The Phoenix and the Carpet	The Phoenix	6 episodes
1998	Seesaw	Morris Price	3 episodes
1999	RKO 281	Louis B. Mayer	TV movie
2001	Murder in Mind	Edward Palmer	Episode: "Teacher"
2001	Victoria & Albert	Baron Christian Friedrich von Stockmar, M.D.	TV movie
2001	The Way We Live Now	Augustus Melmotte	4 episodes
2001–2002	NCS: Manhunt	DI John Borne	Pilot & Series; 8 episodes
2002	Get Carman: The Trials of George Carman QC	George Carman QC	TV movie
2002	Live From Baghdad	Naji Al-Hadithi	TV movie
2003	Henry VIII	Cardinal Thomas Wolsey	TV movie
2004	A Bear Named Winnie	General Hallholland	TV movie
2006	Dracula	Abraham Van Helsing	TV movie
2007	Maxwell	Robert Maxwell	TV movie
2007	Flood	Deputy Prime Minister Campbell	2 episodes
2009	Diverted	Samuel Stern	TV movie
2010	Going Postal	Reacher Gilt	2 episodes
2011	Hidden	Sir Nigel Fountain	3 episodes
2011	Great Expectations	Jaggers	3 episodes
2012	Richard II	Edmund of Langley, Duke of York	Filmed production of the Shakespeare play as part of The Hollow Crown series on BBC2
2014	In the Steps of St. Paul	Narrator	2 Episode BBC TV Documentary
2015	In the Steps of St. Peter	Narrator	2 Episode BBC TV Documentary
2016	Peter Pan Goes Wrong	Narrator	TV movie
2017	Decline and Fall	Dr. Fagan	3 episodes
2017	Doctor Who	The Landlord	Episode: "Knock Knock"
2017	Capitaine Marleau	Herbert White	Episode: "Sang & Lumière"
2018	Urban Myths	Salvador Dalí	Episode: "The Dalí & The Cooper"
2018	Press	George Emmerson	3 episodes
2019	His Dark Materials	Kaisa (voice)	5 episodes
2025	The Au Pair	George	
2026	Ludwig	TBA	Christmas special

=== Theatre ===
Year	Title	Role(s)	Notes
1973	Romeo and Juliet	Tybalt	
1973	Richard II	Messenger	
1973	As You Like It	Orlando	
1973	The Taming of the Shrew	Player	
1973	Toad of Toad Hall	Mole	
1974	King John	Hubert	
1974	Cymbeline	Pisanio	
1974	King Lear	The Fool	
1974	Summerfolk	Nikolai Zamislov	
1974	Comrades	Willmer	
1975	Love's Labour's Lost	Ferdinand	
1976	Sherlock Holmes	Professor Moriarty	
1978	The Tempest	Caliban	
1978	The Taming of the Shrew	Grumio	
1978	Love's Labour's Lost	Sir Nathaniel	
1978	Antony and Cleopatra	Pompey	
1978	The Winter's Tale	Robert Cecil	
1979	He That Plays the King	Gloucester, Henry V, Macbeth, Osric	
1979	Once in a Lifetime	Herman Glogauer	
1979	Measure for Measure	Angelo	
1980	Richard II	Henry Bolingbroke, Duke of Hereford	
1980	Richard III	Edward IV	
1981	The Merchant of Venice	Shylock	
1981	Troilus and Cressida	Achilles	
1981	The Swan Down Gloves	Mazda	
1982	Every Good Boy Deserves Favour	Ivanov	
1985	Othello	Iago	
1987	Separation	Joe Green	
1993	Oleanna	John	
1994	What A Performance	Sid Field	
1996	Who's Afraid of Virginia Woolf?	George	
1999	Amadeus	Antonio Salieri	
2005	Once in a Lifetime	Herman Glogauer	
2007	The Last Confession	Cardinal Giovanni Benelli	
2009	Complicit	Roger Cowan	
2010	All My Sons	Joe Keller	
2012	Long Day's Journey into Night	James Tyrone	
2014	The Last Confession	Cardinal Giovanni Benelli	
2015	The Importance of Being Earnest	Lady Bracknell	
2018	The Price	Gregory Solomon	
2019	The Collection	Harry	
2019	The Price	Gregory Solomon	
2022	Mimma	Alfredo Frassati	
2023	Peter Pan	Captain Hook	
2025	Travels with Agatha Christie	David Suchet	
2026	Murder in the Cathedral	Thomas Becket	

=== Video games ===
- Agatha Christie: Murder on the Orient Express (2006)

== Interviews and TV documentaries ==
=== Poirot and Agatha Christie ===
- David Suchet interviewed by Clive Anderson BBC, Wogan 1990s
- The Agatha Christie code ITV 2005
- David Suchet on playing Hercule Poirot – Dead Man’s Folly Q&A – BFI
- David Suchet Final Poirot scene hardest of my career BBC 2013
- Au revoir Hercule Poirot – BBC News
- Poirot's David Suchet ITV
- The David Suchet Interview by Studio 10 (Australia) The ultra-smooth talking David Suchet aka Agatha Christie's Hercule Poirot drops by Studio 10.
- Premier.tv : David Suchet talks about Poirot
- Holly and Phil chat with David Suchet BBC – 13 November 2013
- The Mystery of Agatha Christie ITV Perspectives, 2013.
- Agatha Christie BBC documentary
- Being Poirot BBC documentary (2014)
- Today Tonight – David Suchet Channel Seven, Perth (Australia) 2014
- David Suchet on Poirot's Death Loose Women ITV 2015
- Travels With Agatha Christie & Sir David Suchet, More4 2025
- Mysteries on the Nile with Sir David Suchet, 2026

=== BBC documentaries ===
- David Suchet on the Orient Express (TV documentary) (2010)
- David Suchet: In the Footsteps of St Paul (BBC documentary) (2012)
- David Suchet: In the Footsteps of St Peter (BBC Documentary) (2015)

=== Other interviews ===
- The One Show: David Suchet – Interview (30 April 2015) BBC
- Long Day's Journey into Night David Suchet on acting, Digital Theatre Plus 2013
- Roles, Characters, Empathy: David Suchet (On) Acting 2012
- Suchet receives CBE BCC 2011
- David Suchet, Actor – A Birthday Tribute 2011
- International Emmy Winner – David Suchet BBC 2009
- David Suchet – Who Do You Think You Are BBC 2009
- Cannes Interview with David Suchet May 1997
