= 2010 London Conservative Party mayoral selection =

London Conservative Party mayoral selection 2010
- 14 October 2010
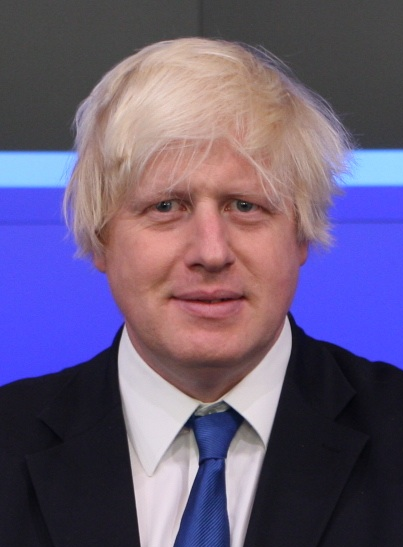
Candidate	Boris Johnson
Popular vote	Unopposed
Elected Mayoral candidate
Boris Johnson
Conservative

The London Conservative Party mayoral selection of 2010 was the process by which the Conservative Party selected its candidate for Mayor of London, to stand in the 2012 mayoral election. Incumbent Mayor Boris Johnson was selected to stand.

== Candidates ==
- Boris Johnson, Mayor of London

== Result ==
Johnson was endorsed as the party's candidate unopposed after a party meeting.

== See also ==
- 2012 London mayoral election
