= Andreas Whittam Smith =

English financial journalist (1937–2025)

Sir Andreas Whittam Smith CBE

First Church Estates Commissioner
- In office 6 March 2002 – June 2017
- Preceded by: John Sclater
- Succeeded by: Loretta Minghella

Personal details
- Born: 13 June 1937 Macclesfield, Cheshire, England
- Died: 29 November 2025 (aged 88)
- Profession: Journalist; Newspaper editor
- Known for: Co-founder of The Independent

Sir Andreas Whittam Smith (13 June 1937 – 29 November 2025) was an English financial journalist, who was one of the founders of The Independent newspaper, which began publication in October 1986 with Whittam Smith as editor. He was a onetime president of the British Board of Film Classification.

== Early life and education ==
Whittam Smith was born in Macclesfield on 13 June 1937, the son of Rev. Canon J. E. Smith, a vicar in Macclesfield, and Margaret Barlow, a piano teacher whose father had been a Lancashire mill owner. He was named after a village on the Isle of Man where his parents had spent their honeymoon. His father had been born in Manchester to a working-class family, and had studied at St John's College, Durham. The family moved to Birkenhead in 1940 when Whittam Smith's father took over a dockland parish.

Whittam Smith was educated at Birkenhead School, and Keble College, Oxford.

== Career ==
Most of his career was spent in the City in journalism, including as City editor of The Guardian and The Daily Telegraph, and as editor of the Investors Chronicle from 1970 to 1977, and Stock Exchange Gazette. With Matthew Symonds, he was a co-founder of The Independent newspaper and was its first editor from 1986 to 1993. He continued to contribute articles on a regular basis after he stood down as editor.

Whittam Smith was chairman of the Financial Ombudsman Service from 2001 to 2003. He was also a director of Independent News and Media (UK), Vice Chairman of Tunbridge Wells Equitable Friendly Society, and a vice-president of the National Council for One Parent Families. He was appointed president of the British Board of Film Classification in 1998, instigating liberalisation of film and video censorship, a post from which he resigned in 2002. He was on the Board of Trustees of The Architecture Foundation.

Whittam Smith was interviewed by National Life Stories (C467/08) in 2007 for the 'Oral History of the British Press' collection held by the British Library.

=== Church of England ===
On 6 March 2002, Whittam Smith was appointed the First Church Estates Commissioner, a senior lay person in the Church of England. As such, he was Chairman of the Church Commissioners' Assets Committee (an investment portfolio of £7 billion), and a member of the Church Commissioners' Board of Governors, the General Synod of the Church of England, and the Archbishops' Council. It was announced in September 2016 that he would be stepping down as First Church Estates Commissioner in June 2017.

== Democracy 2015 ==
In 2012, Whittam Smith started the Democracy 2015 movement to attempt to reform how British democracy functions. The movement's stated aim was to achieve a House of Commons majority in 2015 and form a reformist government independent of parliamentary parties and composed of non-politicians volunteering to stand for a single term only. The movement said that politics should be public service, not a career move. The movement stood a candidate, Adam Lotun, in the Corby by-election on 15 November 2012. He came 13th out of 14 candidates, with 35 votes.

== Personal life and death ==
In 1964, Whittam Smith married Valerie Sherry, with whom he had two sons.

He died on 29 November 2025, at the age of 88.

== Honours ==
In 1988, Whittam Smith was awarded the Honorary Degree of Doctor of Laws (LL.D) by the University of Bath.

In the 2003 New Year Honours, he was made a Commander of the Order of the British Empire (CBE) "for services to the Film Industry." In the 2015 Birthday Honours, he was knighted "for public service, particularly to the Church of England", and therefore granted the title "Sir".

In July 2017, he was awarded the Canterbury Cross for Services to the Church of England by the Archbishop of Canterbury, Justin Welby.

Media offices
Preceded by (founding editor)	Editor of The Independent; 1986–1993	Succeeded by Ian Hargreaves
Preceded by George Lascelles, 7th Earl of Harewood	President of the British Board of Film Classification; 1998–2002	Succeeded by Quentin Thomas
