= Jack Suchet =

English consultant obstetrician and gynaecologist (1908–2001)

- Born: 10 May 1908; Johannesburg, Transvaal Colony
- Died: 9 September 2001 (aged 93); England
- Education: University of Cape Town; St Mary's Hospital Medical School
- Occupations: Consultant obstetrician and gynaecologist
- Known for: Worked with Sir Alexander Fleming on penicillin
- Spouse: Joan Jarché (m. 1943; died 1992)
- Children: 3, including John and David
- Relatives: James Jarché (father-in-law)

Jack Suchet (10 May 1908 – 9 September 2001) was an English consultant obstetrician and gynaecologist, who carried out research on the use of penicillin in the treatment of venereal disease with Sir Alexander Fleming in London. He was the father of television news journalist John Suchet and actor David Suchet.

== Early life ==
Suchet was born in Johannesburg, South Africa, in 1908 to Isidor Suchedowitz, a Lithuanian Jewish immigrant from Memel. His father, who had changed the family surname from Suchedowitz to Suchet, wanted Jack to go into business, and he studied Business Administration at the University of Cape Town in South Africa.

Suchet emigrated from South Africa to England in 1932. He had to struggle initially, and he sold ice creams at Paddington Station, sold his own blood, played bridge for money, and carried out doping tests on greyhounds' saliva. The game of bridge remained his hobby of choice even in his retirement.

In 1933 Suchet started training as a medical student at St Mary's Hospital Medical School (the school is now part of Imperial College London). After being a junior doctor, he chose to specialise in obstetrics and gynaecology.

== Career ==
Suchet worked at St Mary's Hospital in the department of obstetrics, and later as director of the department of venereology. During World War II, he worked with Sir Alexander Fleming on the use of penicillin for the treatment of venereal disease. He also worked with the Royal Army Medical Corps and later returned to St Mary's. In 1953, he became a consultant and started practice on Harley Street, as well as working in East London hospitals.

== Personal life ==
In 1943, Suchet married Joan Jarché, daughter of Fleet Street photographer James Jarché. They had three sons: Peter Suchet; John Suchet, the newsreader; and David Suchet, the actor. He was an atheist.
