= Le Suchet =

Mountain in Switzerland

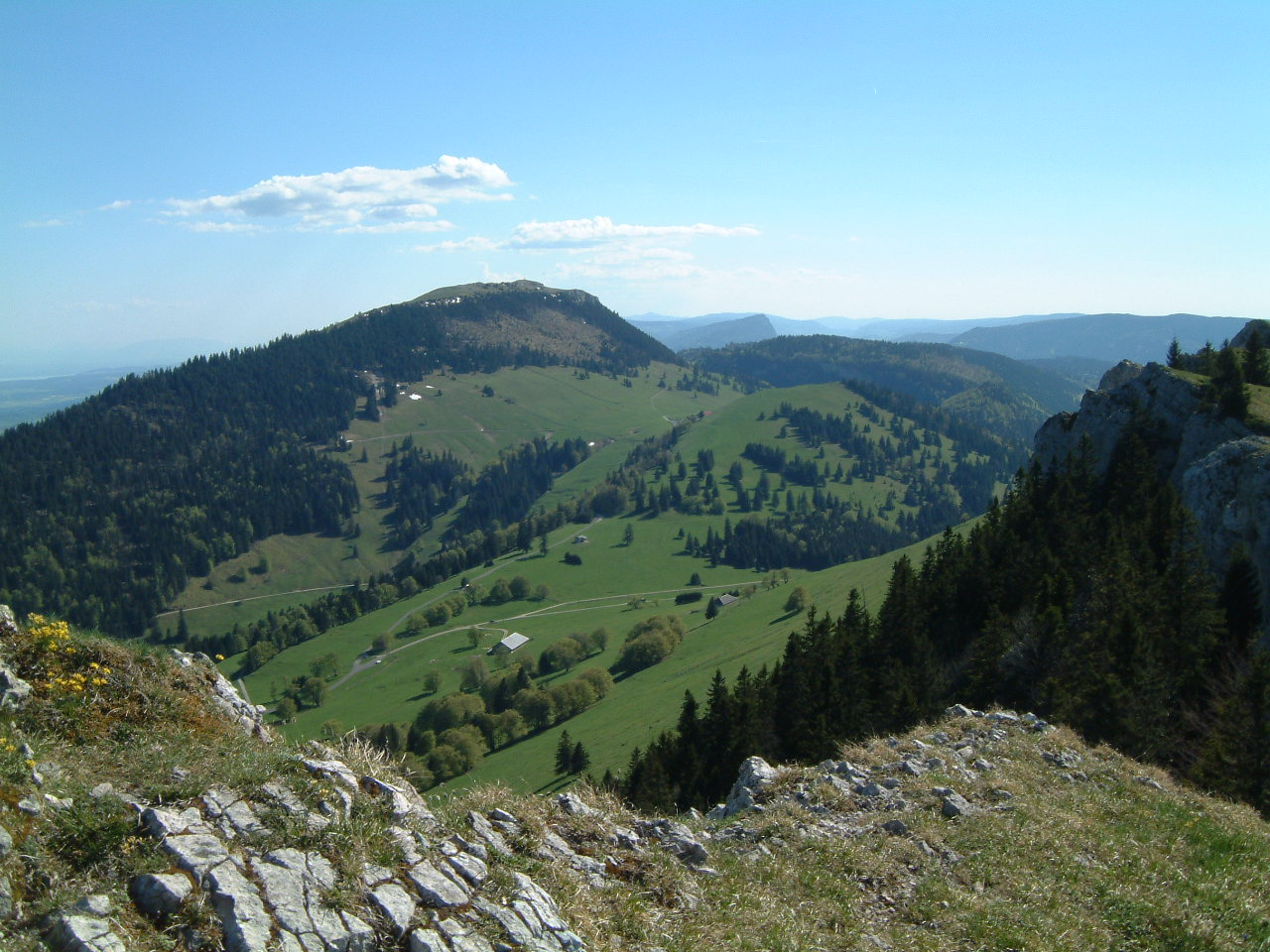
- View from the Aiguilles de Baulmes (north side)

Highest point
- Elevation: 1,588 m (5,210 ft)
- Prominence: 435 m (1,427 ft)
- Parent peak: Le Chasseron
- Isolation: 10.2 km (6.3 mi)
- Coordinates: 46°46′20.5″N 6°27′58″E

Geography
- Location within Switzerland
- Location: Vaud, Switzerland
- Parent range: Jura Mountains

Climbing
- Easiest route: Trail

Le Suchet (French pronunciation: [lə syʃɛ], 1,588 m) is a mountain of the Jura range, located south of Baulmes in the canton of Vaud.

The summit of Le Suchet can be reached easily by several trails and a road culminating at 1,489 metres.
