= Peter Spencer Spokes =

Peter Spencer Spokes FSA (1893–1976) was an English architectural historian and photographer who was a fellow of the Society of Antiquaries of London and served as Sheriff, Lord Mayor and Alderman in Oxford.

== Early life ==
Peter Spokes was born in 1893.

== Career ==
During the Second World War, Spokes worked for the National Buildings Record photographing buildings for their records. He subsequently worked for the Ministry of Town and Country Planning recording properties in Oxford. The last years of his working life were spent at the Bodleian Library.

Spokes was active in Oxford politics, being a councillor from 1951 to 1973 and also holding the offices of Sheriff, Lord Mayor and Alderman.

== Death ==
Spokes died in 1976.
