= William Norman Ewer =

British journalist (1885–1977)

(William) Norman Ewer CBE (22 October 1885 – 25 January 1977) was a British journalist, remembered mostly now for a few lines of verse. He was prominent as a writer on foreign affairs for the Daily Herald of London, and was accused of being a Soviet agent.

== Early life ==
He was the only son of William Thomas Ewer, a silk merchant, and his wife Julia Stone, born at Hornsey in north London. He studied at Merchant Taylors' School, Northwood and Trinity College, Cambridge, where he read mathematics for Part I of the Tripos (emerging as fifteenth Wrangler) and history for Part II. At Cambridge he was a member of the Fabian Society, where he made a lifelong friend in Alfred Louis Bacharach.

Ewer became secretary to Maurice de Forest, through whom he met George Lansbury. His employer de Forrest opposed the United Kingdom's participation in World War I; Ewer was a pacifist and conscientious objector, and a lecturer for the Union of Democratic Control. An occasion in 1915 on which he spoke in pacifist terms for the UDC at East Finchley Methodist Church drew attention to him from MI5.

Ewer was part of a group of National Guilds League members supportive of the October Revolution of 1917. Along with Robin Page Arnot, Rajani Palme Dutt, William Holmes, Will Mellor and Ellen Wilkinson, Ewer formed the Guild Communists, which became a founding element of the Communist Party of Great Britain (CPGB).

== Journalist ==
Ewer was recruited by George Lansbury and from 1912 was writing in the Daily Herald. Lansbury thought highly of his stamina: he is quoted as saying Ewer "has the constitution of a horse and the capacity of going without food of a camel." He was known in Fleet Street as Trilby Ewer: the nickname came from the eponymous heroine of the novel Trilby, and her habit which he shared of walking with bare feet.

Ewer came onto the management committee of the Herald, representing his employer Maurice de Forrest who was a backer of the paper. He wrote in support of guild socialism and the National Guilds League during World War I in A. R. Orage's The New Age. In 1918 he wrote in the Workers' Dreadnought, defending the concept of the dictatorship of the proletariat in a socialist revolution.

After the end of the war Ewer returned to the Daily Herald, with the post of foreign editor.

== Activities on behalf of the USSR ==
Ewer was a well-known writer in left-wing publications. He was an early opponent of Trotsky, and may have followed instructions from Moscow.

According to Madeira writing in 2003, Ewer was an active Soviet agent from the early 1920s. He ran a ring from the London offices of the Federated Press of America (FPA), called a Comintern front. It contained George Slocombe in Paris, Walter Dale, and Arthur Lakey. MI5 kept Ewer under surveillance. From 1925 to 1927, according to Bennett, MI5 and the SIS jointly monitored the Ewer group's activities. Following the MI5 raid on the All Russian Co-operative Society in May 1927, the group pulled in its horns. Lakey, a former police officer by then using the surname Allen, became an MI5 informer in 1928, giving details of two Special Branch officers who had been suborned by Ewer into passing information from at latest 1922. Callaghan and Morgan in a paper of 2006 criticised aspects of Madeira's interpretation, in particular with respect to the characterisation of the FPA, founded in 1919 as a press agency, and in his acceptance of the MI5 narrative.

In his own defence, Ewer stated that he was not a spy, engaged in espionage: his work was "purely counter", involving only counter-espionage. This distinction was dismissed by Maxwell Knight. Ewer has been mentioned in connection with Clare Sheridan (1885–1970), writer and sculptor, who passed on comments of Winston Churchill, her relative. MI5 chose in 1929 not to prosecute him, possibly to avoid embarrassment on the government side, and there was no wish to revive the Zinoviev letter farrago of 1924. They did arrest Dale and the two Special Branch officers who had leaked operational details, Inspector Hubert van Ginhoven and Sergeant Charles Jane. Again there were no prosecutions, and it is suggested that the reason was to keep secret the methods of the security services.

== Post-war propaganda ==
Around the beginning of 1930 Ewer left the CPGB in a public way. He disagreed with the direction of the Comintern, and the requirement of adherence to the party line, to the detriment of critical thinking. His reasoning was roughly handled by Rajani Palme Dutt of the CPGB.

Ewer wrote in May 1947 a series of articles critical of life in Russia, and debated with pro-Stalin Labour Party politician D. N. Pritt. He continued to write on foreign affairs into the Cold War years, taking an anti-Soviet line. Declassified archives show that Ewer's anti-communist works were promoted and funded by a propaganda wing of the British Foreign Office, the Information Research Department (IRD).

== Quotations ==
Often quoted is

I gave my life for freedom - this I know:
For those who bade me fight had told me so.

This is the refrain of his anti-war poem Five Souls, which Ewer contributed to the British Nation on 3 October 1914.

Also attributed to him is the epigram

How odd of God/To choose the Jews.

This was said to Benno Moisewitsch at London's Savage Club, at some point in the 1920s.

== Family ==
Ewer married in 1912 Monica Thompson, daughter of the barrister William Marcus Thompson. She was a novelist. The silent film Not for Sale was adapted from one of her books. She also acted as secretary of the National Guilds League. The zoologist and physiologist Denis William Ewer (1913–2009) was their son.
