= John Suchet =

British news presenter

John Suchet OBE
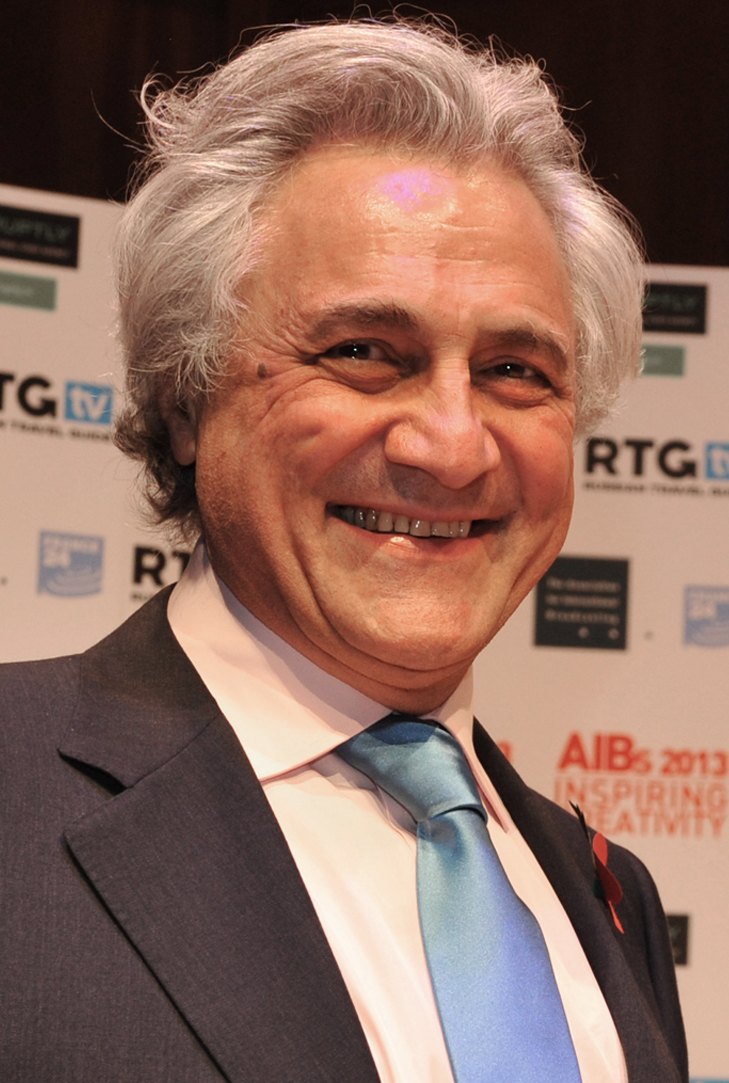
- Suchet in 2013
- Born: John Aleck Suchet; 29 March 1944 (age 82); Paddington, London, England
- Education: Queen's College, Dundee
- Occupations: News presenter, Journalist
- Years active: 1967–present
- Agent: David Foster Management
- Notable credit: Early Evening News
- Spouses: Moya Suchet (m. 1968; div. 1983) Bonnie Suchet (m. 1985; died 2015) Nula Black (m. 2016)
- Children: 3
- Father: Jack Suchet
- Relatives: David Suchet (brother); James Jarché (grandfather)
- Website: www.johnsuchet.co.uk

John Aleck Suchet OBE (/ˈsuːʃeɪ/ SOO-shay; born 29 March 1944) is an English author, television news journalist and presenter of classical music on Classic FM. He began his journalistic career as a graduate trainee at the Reuters news agency in 1967. After a spell as a sub-editor for the BBC Nine O'Clock News in 1970 and 1971, he became a scriptwriter and sub-editor at Independent Television News (ITN) in 1972. He continued to work for ITN, latterly as a reporter and newsreader, until retiring from the company in 2004.

Suchet has two brothers, one of whom is David Suchet.

== Early life ==
Suchet was born in London, the son of Joan Patricia (née Jarché; 1916–1992), an actress, and Jack Suchet (1908–2001), who emigrated from South Africa to England in 1932, and trained to be a doctor at St Mary's Hospital, London in 1933. Suchet's father was a consultant obstetrician and gynaecologist, working with Alexander Fleming on the role of penicillin in treating venereal disease. His maternal grandfather, James Jarché, was a famous Fleet Street photographer, notable for the first pictures of Edward VIII and Wallis Simpson and also for his pictures of Louis Blériot (1909) and the Siege of Sidney Street. Suchet's father was of Lithuanian Jewish descent, and his mother was English-born and Anglican (she was of Russian Jewish descent on her own father's side, and of English descent on her mother's side).

Suchet was brought up with his two brothers in London. He attended Uppingham School in Rutland, and played the trombone and piano. Suchel enrolled at Queen's College, Dundee (then a part of the University of St Andrews, now the University of Dundee), graduating in 1967 with a 2:2 in philosophy and political science. His younger brother, David, is an actor.

== Career ==
Suchet was passionate about languages and the news while at St. Andrews and combined both to make journalism as his career path. He began working in journalism in 1967, when he was taken on as a graduate trainee by the Reuters news agency after applications to the BBC trainee scheme and Scottish Television proved unsuccessful. During that year he learned the basics of straightforward, unbiased news reporting. Suchet worked on Reuters's Middle Eastern desk before going to the African desk and the World desk. He was later assigned to Reuters's Paris bureau in 1968 and reported on the May 68 student riots in the French capital.

He decided to try to get into television and had a brief spell at BBC Television News as a sub-editor for the Nine O'Clock News in 1971 and 1972 after the corporation had no vacancies for a foreign correspondent. Suchet joined Independent Television News (ITN) as a scriptwriter/sub-editor in August 1972. He became a reporter in 1976, and over the next decade he covered major national and international news stories, including the Iranian revolution, the Soviet invasion of Afghanistan, and the Philippines Revolution. Suchet was barred from Iran in September 1979 because he was informed by officials that he would not be allowed to enter the nation without acquiring a special Press visa.

He read the news for ITN from 1981 to 1983 and again from 1986 to 2004. In February 1987, Suchet began presenting the half-hour nightly English-language ITN Super Channel News bulletin on the Super Channel satellite television service, having been loaned to the channel by ITN. He read the lunchtime bulletin ITN News at 12:30 in 1987 until he was relieved by Julia Somerville, and joined the bulletin full-time on 2 May 1989 after leaving Super Channel. He presented every ITN bulletin, including News at Ten. In March 1992, Suchet became the main presenter of the Early Evening News bulletin, replacing Fiona Armstrong and Carol Barnes until 1999.

He also presented or contributed to numerous special event programmes on ITN such as their all night coverage of the start of the Gulf War, and the Budget of the United Kingdom from 1990 to 1994. Suchet provided commentary on ITN's coverage of the funeral of Diana, Princess of Wales in September 1997, the wedding of Prince Edward and Sophie Rhys-Jones in June 1999, the Queen Mother's 100th Birthday pageant in 2000 and the funeral of the Queen Mother two years later.

He retired from ITN in April 2004. He later presented Five News, initially for a six-month period from January 2006, until his retirement from news reading in 2007. Suchet has also been a guest presenter for ITV's This Morning, as well as being a guest panellist on Five's The Wright Stuff. He hosted the revival of the quiz show Going for Gold on Channel 5 from 2008 to 2009.

=== Classical music ===
In July 2010, Suchet joined Classic FM as the regular host of the Sunday lunchtime music show (12:00–15:00). He had first appeared on the station in 2004 as guest presenter of the Composer's Notes series in which he examined the finances and wealth of famous composers. In September 2010 it was announced that he would be presenting the Classic FM weekday morning show (9:00–13:00) from January 2011, taking over from the show's previous host Simon Bates. This quickly became Classic FM's most listened-to show, with over 3 million listeners per week. He received two international awards for this show, from the Association for International Broadcasting and the New York Festivals. In 2020 he began hosting Classic FM's daily evening concert and continued to do so until 1 July 2022.

Suchet is an authority on the life and music of the composer Ludwig van Beethoven, and has become one of the UK's leading experts on Beethoven and his work. He has published seven books on Beethoven, beginning with the three-volume biographical novel The Last Master (1996 to 1998). This was followed by The Friendly Guide to Beethoven (2006), The Treasures of Beethoven (2008), Beethoven – The Man Revealed (2012), and Beethoven – The Man Revealed (special anniversary edition, 2020). Another, In Search of Beethoven: A Personal Journey, is due in October 2024.

Suchet has also published biographies of Johann Strauss the Younger, The Last Waltz – The Strauss Dynasty and Vienna (2015), Mozart – The Man Revealed (2016), Verdi - The Man Revealed (2017) and Tchaikovsky – The Man Revealed (2018).

== Personal life ==
He has three sons from his first marriage to his wife Mora that lasted from 1968 to 1984.

Suchet and his second wife Bonnie had five grown-up sons between them from previous marriages. In 2006, Bonnie was diagnosed with Alzheimer's disease in her early 60s. Suchet appeared on the mainstream ITN/ITV and BBC news bulletins on 17 February 2009 to talk about this, to raise awareness of the disease and to campaign on behalf of Admiral Nurses. He explained that Bonnie would have no idea that he was on the news programmes. Bonnie died in 2015. He published his memoirs My Bonnie: How Dementia Stole the Love of My Life in 2010.

In July 2016, John Suchet married Nula Black.

== Honours and awards ==
Suchet has received several honours for his work as a television reporter and newscaster. He received the Royal Television Society's (RTS) 1986 Journalist of the Year award for his coverage of the Philippines Revolution, the citation commending his ability "to bring clarity to confused situations". In March 1996 he received the Television and Radio Industries Club's Newscaster/Reporter of the Year Award. Suchet was awarded an Honorary Doctor of Laws by the University of Dundee in 2000, and he was appointed an honorary fellow of the Royal Academy of Music in 2001 for his work on Beethoven.

In 2008 the RTS awarded him the Lifetime Achievement Award. Suchet was made an Honorary Master of Arts from the University of Worcester in 2010. He was awarded the Radio Personality of the Year Award by the Association for International Broadcasting Awards in November 2013 and a Gold Award in the Best Radio Personality category at the 2014 New York Festivals International Radio Programme Awards. Suchet was appointed Officer of the Order of the British Empire (OBE) in the 2023 New Year Honours for services to journalism and charity.

Preceded by Henry Kelly	Host of Going for Gold; 2008–2009	Succeeded by Series ended
Media offices
Preceded by Kirsty Young	Main presenter of Five News; 2006–2007	Succeeded by Natasha Kaplinsky
