= Jack Denton Scott =

American author

Jack Denton Scott (1915–1995) was an American author who contributed to Reader's Digest for thirty years. Born in Elkins, West Virginia, Scott started writing at the age of 16. He studied literature at Columbia University and University of Oxford.

He also worked as a war correspondent for an army newspaper. He also worked as the dogs editor for Field & Stream.

== Bibliography ==
- The Complete Book of Pasta: an Italian Cookbook (1968)
- Loggerhead Turtle: Survivor from the Sea (1974)
- Canada Geese (1976)
- Discovering the Mysterious Egret (1978)
- Island of Wild Horses (1978)
- Moose (1981)
- The Meat and Potatoes Cookbook (1988)
- Rice: A Cookbook (1989)
