= Daily Herald (United Kingdom) =

British daily newspaper (1912–1964)

The cover of the Daily Herald detailing the start of the Second World War

The Daily Herald was a British daily newspaper, published daily in London from 1912 to 1964 (although it was weekly during the First World War). It was published in the interest of the labour movement and supported the Labour Party. It underwent several changes of management before ceasing publication in 1964, when it was relaunched as The Sun, in its pre-Murdoch form.

== Origins ==
In December 1910, the printers' union, the London Society of Compositors (LSC), became engaged in an industrial struggle to establish a 48-hour workweek and started a daily strike bulletin called The World. Will Dyson, an Australian artist in London, contributed a cartoon. From 25 January 1911, it was renamed the Daily Herald and was published until the end of the strike in April 1911. At its peak, it had daily sales of 25,000.

Ben Tillett, the dockers' leader, and other radical trade unionists were inspired to raise funds for a permanent labour movement daily, to compete with the newspapers that championed the two main political parties, the Liberals and Conservatives, but independent of the official Labour Party and the Trades Union Congress, which were planning a daily of their own (launched as the Daily Citizen in October 1912).

The initial organising group included Tillett, T. E. Naylor of the LSC, the socialist politician George Lansbury, Robert Williams of the Transport Workers, W. N. Ewer and Francis Meynell. Retaining the strike sheet name, they formed a Daily Herald company. Readers and supporters formed local branches of the Daily Herald League, through which they had their say in the running of the paper.

== Syndicalist period, 1912–1913 ==
The first issue appeared on 15 April 1912, edited by William H. Seed. A key feature was Dyson's cartoons, which made a contribution to the paper's political tone. Its politics were broadly syndicalist: it gave unconditional support to strikers and argued for a socialist revolution based on workers' self-organisation in trade unions. It also gave strong support to suffragettes and to anti-colonial struggles, especially in Ireland. Early issues dealt with the loss of the RMS Titanic, emphasising the disproportionate loss of life among crew members and poor third-class passengers, and demonstrating the distinct perspective of the new paper.

Staff writers included W. P. Ryan, Langdon Everard and George Slocombe. The editor of the Women's Page was Margaret Travers-Symons, and Katharine Susannah Prichard wrote for it. Vance Palmer's poems were used on the front page. G. K. Chesterton was a frequent contributor. His brother Cecil and Hilaire Belloc were occasional contributors. After Seed was removed as editor, Rowland Kenney, the brother of Annie Kenney; C. Sheridan Jones; and finally Charles Lapworth held the position.

In June 1913, the Daily Herald company was forced into liquidation. Lansbury and Charles Lapworth formed a new company, the Limit Printing and Publishing Company. (When the Liberal leader Lloyd George was asked a question about the Herald, he declared, "That paper is the limit.")

The shortfall in production costs was guaranteed by wealthy friends of Lansbury, and Francis Meynell joined the board as their representative. From December 1912 until August 1914, one of the main financial supporters was H. D. Harben, also a founder of the New Statesman. From this point, the members of the Daily Herald League had no formal influence on the paper.

In late 1913, Lapworth was asked by the other two board members to resign as editor. Lansbury and the paper's financial backers were disturbed by Lapworth and other writers' attacks on individuals, both in the establishment and the labour movement. "Hatred of conditions by all means, but not of persons" was how Lapworth quoted Lansbury. The aftermath was aired in the letter pages of The New Age between December 1913 and April 1914.

== The Herald under Lansbury, 1914–1922 ==
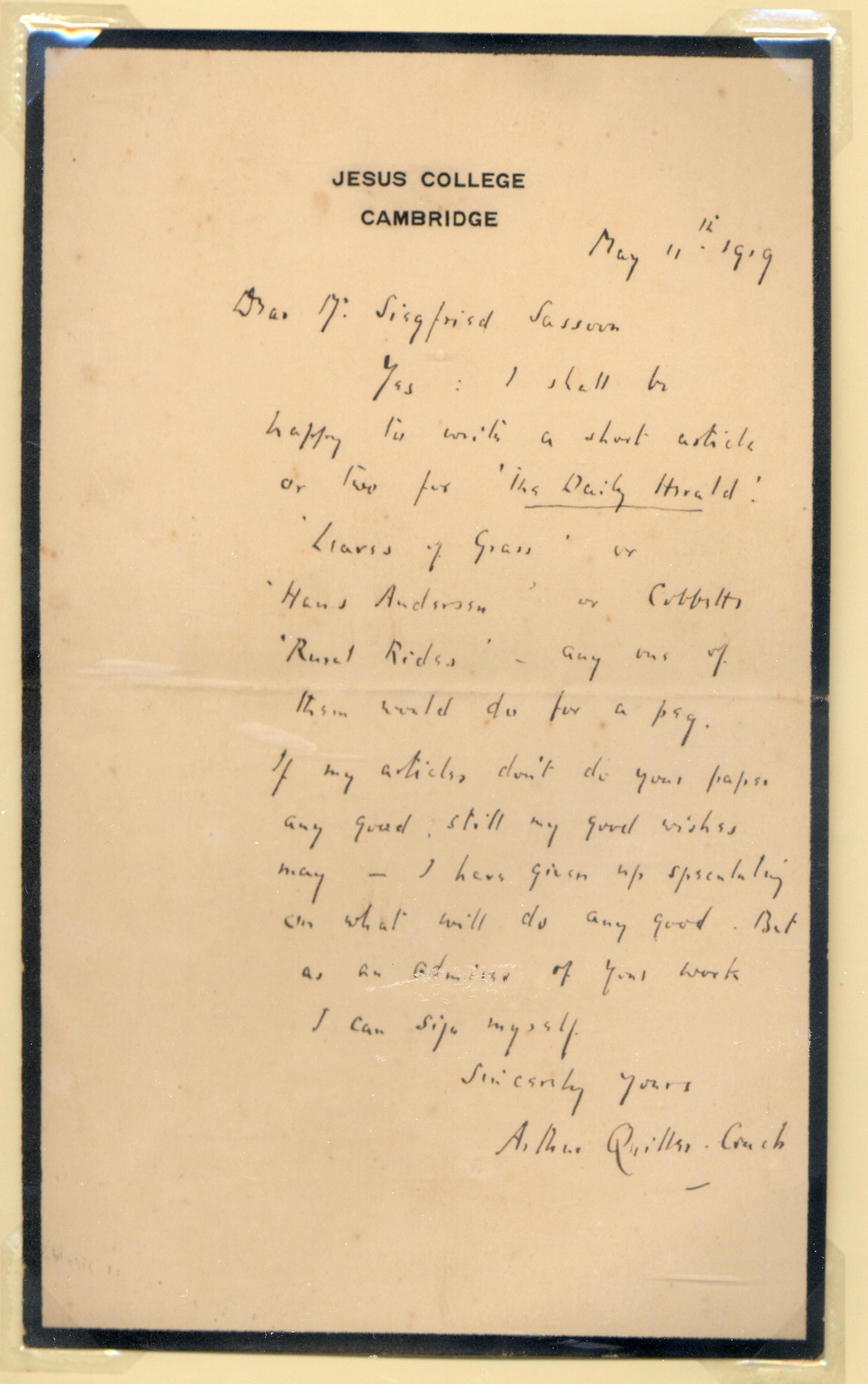
A handwritten letter to the Herald's literary editor Siegfried Sassoon from Arthur Quiller-Couch, about the possibility of Quiller-Couch writing for the paper

The new paper struggled financially but somehow survived, with Lansbury playing an ever-increasing role in keeping it afloat.

Under Lansbury, the Herald took an eclectic but relentlessly militant political position and achieved sales of 50,000–150,000 a day. But war in August 1914—or rather the subsequent split on the left whether to support or oppose the war—radically reduced its constituency. Lansbury and his colleagues, core of the anti-war left, decided to go weekly. The paper played a key role in the campaign against the war for the next four years. It was in the forefront of the movement against conscription and supported conscientious objectors; and it welcomed the Russian Revolutions of February and October 1917. There were notable journalistic scoops, most famously its story in November 1917 on "How they starve at the Ritz", an exposé of conspicuous consumption by the rich at a time of national hardship. The story was extensively reprinted in leaflets and some historians believe that it pushed the government into introducing compulsory rationing.

The Herald resumed daily publication in 1919, and again played a role propagandising for strikes and against armed intervention in Russia amid the social turmoil of 1919–21. When the radical wave subsided, the Herald found itself broke and unable to continue as an independent left daily. Lansbury handed over the paper to the Trades Union Congress and the Labour Party in 1922. The newspaper had begun to publish the Bobby Bear cartoon strip in 1919.

In August 1920, Lev Kamenev, a leading member of the Bolshevik regime in Russia, visiting London as part of the negotiations that led to the March 1921 Anglo-Soviet Trade Agreement, sent a telegram addressed to Lenin in Moscow that was intercepted and deciphered by British intelligence. The telegram stated that Kamenev had paid £40,000.00 to the Daily Herald, and a further payment of £10,000 would be made shortly.

Historical copies of the Daily Herald are available to search and view in digitised form at the British Newspaper Archive.

== The third Daily Herald, 1922–1929 ==
The Herald was the official organ of the Trades Union Congress from 1922, during which point the fledgling Labour Party brought in Hamilton Fyfe, who recruited prestigious journalists such as Douglas Cole (better known as G.D.H. Cole) and Evelyn Sharp, who were supportive of socialism. He left in 1926 over disputes regarding what to publish, at which point Frederick Salusbury was appointed acting editor-in-chief. Prior to Fyfe's resignation, Salusbury had served as a columnist at the Daily Express, where he helped create the Express' famous Beachcomber gossip column with Dominic Wyndham Lewis. During his brief time as acting editor, Salusbury began to attract middle- and upper-class readership, although the publication was primarily marketed to tradesmen.

Between 1923 and 1964, the newspaper awarded the Order of Industrial Heroism, popularly known as the "Workers' VC," to honour examples of heroism carried out by ordinary workers.

== The fourth Daily Herald, 1930–1964 ==
The TUC sold a 51 per cent share of the Herald to Odhams Press, publisher of The People, a Sunday paper, in 1930. Odhams (then run by Lord Southwood) was interested in using its presses during the week; the TUC wanted Odhams' expertise in promoting newspapers. A promotion campaign ensued, and in 1933, the Herald became the world's best-selling daily newspaper, with certified net sales of 2 million. This accomplishment set off a war with more conservative London papers, such as the Daily Express.

The Daily Herald strongly condemned the Nazi-Soviet Pact and the Soviet invasion of Finland. In an editorial about the latter, the paper stated:

Now finally Stalin's Russia sacrifices all claims to the respect of the working class movement...The Union of Soviet Socialist Republics is dead. Stalin's new imperialist Russia takes its place.

The Herald's sales were static or in decline during the post-war period, but a survey in 1958 suggested that it had the highest level of appreciation of any newspaper among its almost exclusively working class readership. Amongst the oldest and poorest people living in Britain, 59% of them were male, the highest proportion of any newspaper being published at the time. According to Roy Greenslade, the editorial staff were firmly entrenched between those advocating populism or politics with no "synthesis" between the positions possible.

The International Publishing Corporation acquired Odhams shares around 1961 when they took over that company and the minority stake owned by the TUC in 1964. In 1955, the title's share of total newspaper circulation and advertising sales were both 10.8%, but this had declined to 8.1% and 3.5%, respectively, by 1964.

Following a study commissioned from market researcher Mark Abrams, whose conclusions suggested reasons why the Herald was in decline, it was reborn as The Sun in 1964 under editor Sydney Jacobson. Roy Greenslade, though, has suggested that the Daily Herald was, in fact, losing readers to its own stable mate, the Daily Mirror, rather than because of social changes. By 1969, the original Sun had fewer readers than the Herald at the end of its existence. The newspaper was sold to Rupert Murdoch's News Limited (the holding group for all of his interests at the time), and its format and (eventually) its politics were significantly altered.

The photographic archive of the Daily Herald, including the work of photographers such as James Jarché, is at the National Science and Media Museum in Bradford. In 2022, nearly 50,000 images from the Daily Herald Archive were digitised and published online in partnership with Google Arts & Culture.

== Editors ==
1912: William H. Seed
1912: Rowland Kenney
1913: Charles Lapworth
1913: George Lansbury
1922: W. P. Ryan
1922: Hamilton Fyfe
1926: William Mellor
1931: W. H. Stevenson
1936: Francis Williams
1940: Percy Cudlipp
1953: Sydney Elliott
1957: Douglas Machray
1960: John Beaven
1962: Sydney Jacobson

Source: D. Butler and A. Sloman, British Political Facts, 1900–1975, London: Macmillan, 1975, p. 378

== Sources ==
- Stanley Reynolds Poor Men's Guardians: A Record of the Struggles for a Democratic Newspaper Press, 1763–1973 (ISBN 0853153019) Pages 173 to 178.
- Unpublished notes, written in 1960 by Robin Page Arnot, held by the Working Class Movement Library.
- The New Age – Letters to the Editor, particularly 18 December 1913, 8 January, 26 February and 5 March 1914.
- James Curran The British Press: a Manifesto, Macmillan, London, 1978
