= Carry the bat =

Cricket terminology

In cricket, the term carry the bat (or carry one's bat) refers to an opening batsman (no. 1 and 2) who is not dismissed ("not out") when the team innings is closed.

The term is mainly used when the innings closes after all 10 wickets have fallen; that is, the other 10 players in the team have all been dismissed ("out"). It may also be used in situations where one or more of these players retire out or are unable to bat through injury or illness, and the remaining players are all dismissed normally. It is not used, however, in any other situation where the innings closes before all 10 wickets have fallen, such as when it is declared closed, or when the team successfully chases a set run target to win the match.

== Origin of the phrase ==
The term "carrying one's bat" dates back to the very early days of cricket. Initially it referred to any not out batsman, but by the 20th century the term was used exclusively to refer to opening batsmen. The expression comes from a time when the team used to share bats so the outgoing batsman would leave the bat on the crease for the next batsman to use.

== Occurrences in international cricket ==
Carrying one's bat is a relatively rare occurrence in international cricket.

In more than 2,500 Test matches, a batsman has carried his bat only 57 times (by 49 batsmen). The first to do so was South African Bernard Tancred in March 1889, against England at Newlands in Cape Town, hitting 26 not out (off 91 balls) as his team were bowled out for 47 in their first innings. South Africa's Dean Elgar and the West Indies' Desmond Haynes are the only men to have carried their bat through three Test innings.

In more than 4,600 One Day Internationals, the feat has been achieved only 13 times, all by different batsmen. Zimbabwean Grant Flower was the first, hitting 84 not out (off 143 balls) in his team's 205 against England at the Sydney Cricket Ground on 15 December 1994, while Temba Bavuma was the most recent on September 7, 2023.

In more than 3,600 Twenty20 Internationals, the feat has been achieved only 5 times, all by different batsmen. West Indian Chris Gayle was the first batsman to carry his bat in a T20I, which he did in a defeat against Sri Lanka in the ICC World Twenty20 semi-final at The Oval on 19 June 2009, hitting 63 not out (off 50 balls) in an innings of 101.

== Occurrences in other first-class cricket ==
In first-class cricket, the record for the highest total by an opener was set in 1899. International opener Bobby Abel carried his bat through Surrey's innings of 811 against Somerset at The Oval. His contribution alone was 357 not out. This was not broken until Samit Gohel playing for Gujarat made 359 not out in the quarter-finals of the 2016–17 Ranji Trophy in December 2016.

The only cricketer ever to bowl a hat-trick and carry his bat in the same match was the Australian Frank Tarrant, playing for Middlesex against Gloucestershire on 26 August 1909. Tarrant hit 55 not out in his team's first innings of 145 and then dismissed Jack Board, Wilfred Brownlee and Thomas Langdon in consecutive deliveries in Gloucestershire's second innings.
