= Leon Howard =

Leon Howard may refer to:

- Lee Howard (journalist) (1914–1978), British newspaper editor
- Leon Howard (South Carolina politician) (born 1955), American politician
- Leon Howard (Tennessee politician) (1849–1912), American politician
- Leon Howard (scholar), scholar of American literature and Herman Melville biographer
