= Richard Kemp =

British Army officer (born 1959)

Colonel Richard Kemp CBE
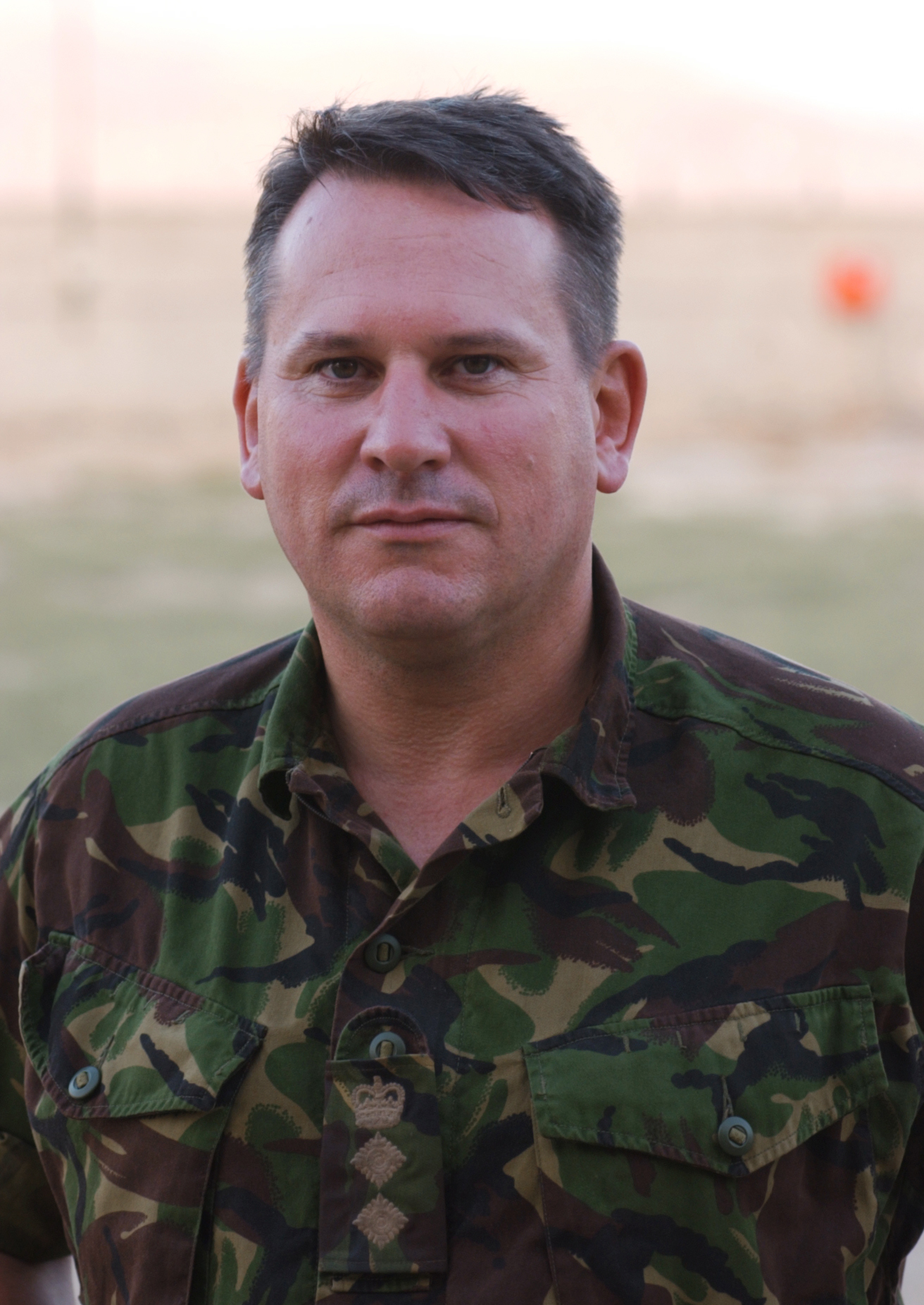
- Kemp, pictured in 2003
- Born: 14 April 1959 (age 67); Maldon, Essex, England
- Military career
- Allegiance: United Kingdom
- Branch: British Army
- Service years: 1977–2006
- Rank: Colonel
- Service number: 505991
- Unit: Royal Anglian Regiment
- Conflicts: Operation Banner; Gulf War; Bosnian War; War in Afghanistan; Iraq War
- Awards: Commander of the Order of the British Empire; Queen's Commendation for Bravery

Richard Justin Kemp (born 14 April 1959) is a retired British Army officer who served from 1977 to 2006. Kemp was an infantry battalion commanding officer. Among his assignments were the command of Operation Fingal in Afghanistan from July to November 2003. After retiring Kemp co-wrote Attack State Red with Chris Hughes, an account of the 2007 Afghanistan campaign undertaken by the Royal Anglian Regiment, documenting their initial deployment.

Kemp has spoken on a range of social and political issues, including the British armed forces, the Middle East, and the European Union.

He is the head of the UK Friends of the Association for the Wellbeing of Israel’s Soldiers (UK-AWIS), the UK branch of AWIS, an Israeli organisation managed by the Israel Defense Forces and headed by General Yoram Yair.

== Early life and military career ==
Kemp was educated at Colchester Royal Grammar School before serving as a soldier and officer in the Royal Anglian Regiment from 1977 to 2006. Having trained as an infantry soldier in 1977 at Bassingbourn Barracks, Cambridgeshire, he attended the Royal Military Academy Sandhurst and was commissioned as second lieutenant on the General List on 5 August 1978. Posted back to the Royal Anglian Regiment in 1979, Kemp was appointed as a platoon commander with the 3rd Battalion, based in Palace Barracks, Belfast.

During his military career Kemp completed seven deployments on Operation Banner in Northern Ireland. He was promoted to the rank of lieutenant in 1980 and Captain in 1985. He later became a training instructor at Bassingbourn before a posting to the 2nd Battalion as the second in command of a company, Milan Platoon commander, and then battle group operations officer, serving in several locations across the world, including a tour as part of UNFICYP in Cyprus.

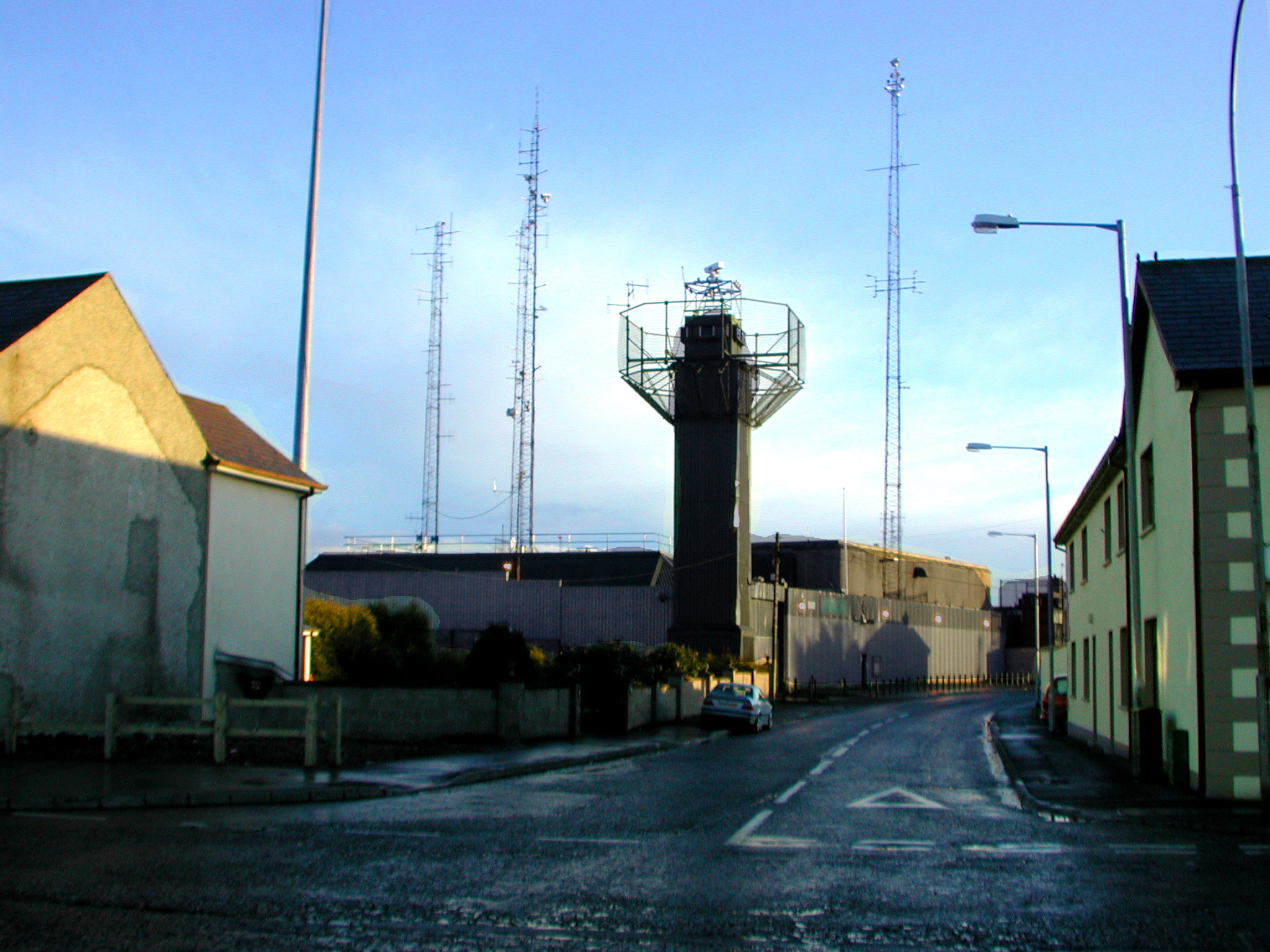
Crossmaglen Security Forces Base, South Armagh, Northern Ireland

As a captain in the Royal Anglian Regiment, Kemp took part in the first Gulf War in 1990–91, commanding the Tactical Headquarters of 7th Armoured Brigade, and was promoted to the rank of Major in 1991.

Following tours with the 7th Armoured Brigade and in Headquarters Northern Ireland, he returned to the 2nd Battalion of the Royal Anglian Regiment as Point Company Commander, leading the company in Bosnia, Germany and Canada. In Bosnia, he served on operations with the United Nations (UNPROFOR). He then took over the Armoured Infantry Training and Advisory Team based at Hohne and Sennelager, and held a staff appointment in the Ministry of Defence.

Kemp was promoted to the rank of lieutenant-colonel in 1997 and commanded the 1st Battalion of the Royal Anglian Regiment in Oakington and Derry from 1998 to 2000. After this command, he was appointed commander of the Operational Training and Advisory Group and then spent six months as Counter Terrorism and Security Advisor to the Government of Macedonia.

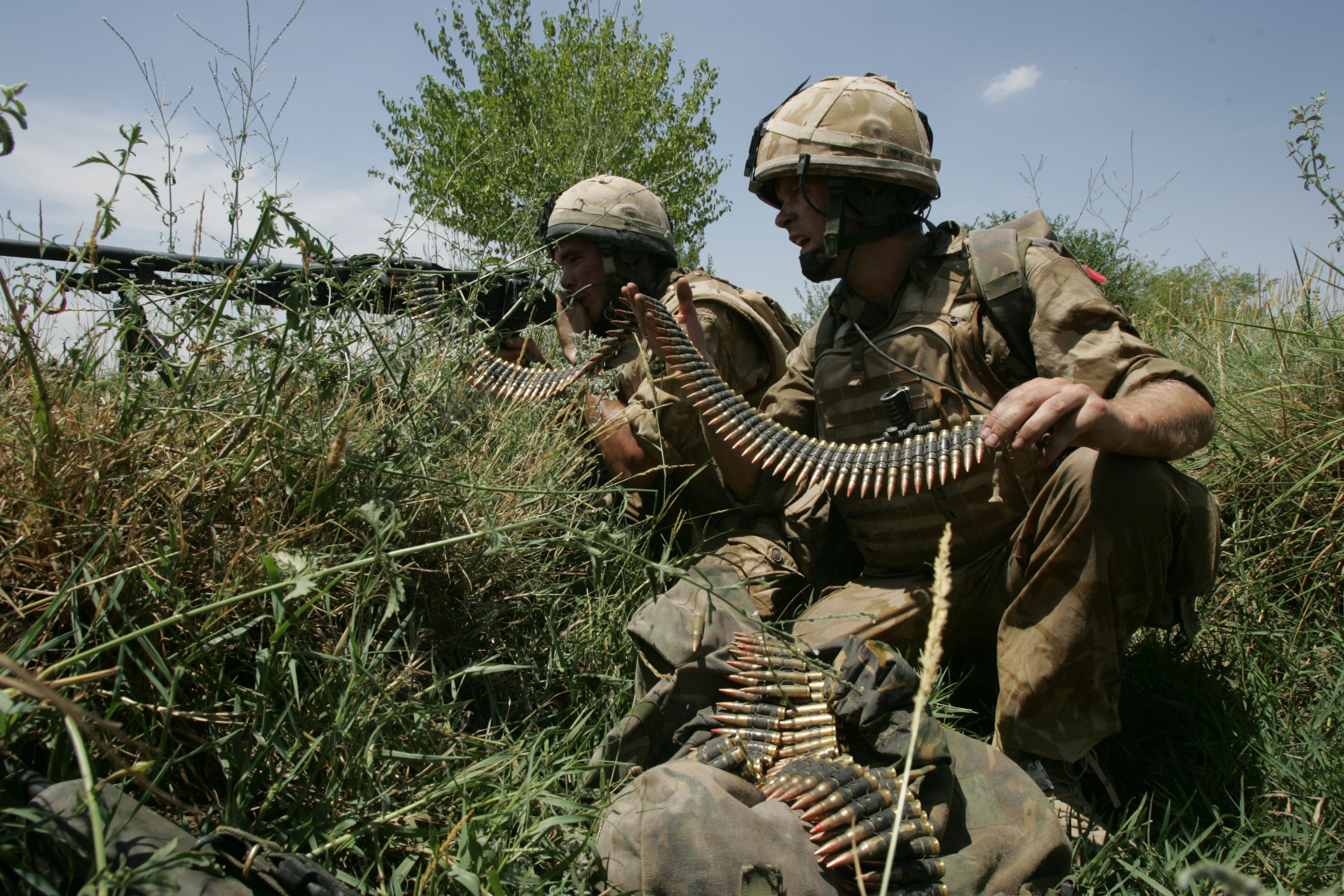
Royal Anglian machine-gunners, Helmand, 2007

Kemp was attached to the Cabinet Office from 2001 to 2006, during which time he was briefly Commander of Operation Fingal in Afghanistan (between July and November 2003) with approximately 300 soldiers under his command. At the Cabinet Office he worked for the Joint Intelligence Committee and the national crisis management group, COBRA, during the period of the 2005 London bombings and a series of kidnappings of British nationals in Iraq and Afghanistan. His responsibilities included Iraq, and he made several visits to Baghdad, Fallujah and Mosul. He was promoted to the rank of colonel on 30 June 2004 and retired from the army on 30 March 2006.

After leaving the army, Kemp co-authored the book Attack State Red with Chris Hughes, a journalist with the Daily Mirror. It describes the deployment of the Royal Anglian Regiment in Helmand Province, Afghanistan, in 2007 as a part of Operation Herrick. The title of the book comes from the British military standing operating procedures (SOPs) for the alert state of a base referring to the likelihood of attack. The book was published in September 2009 by Penguin Books.

== Politics ==
Kemp has repeatedly spoken out against the investigation and prosecution of British soldiers for suspected criminal acts in Afghanistan and Iraq, as well as the opening of new investigations relating to the actions of British soldiers in Northern Ireland during the Troubles, including those relating to Bloody Sunday. Kemp told the Belfast News Letter that he was concerned about the investigations into historic crimes, stating "It is obvious some soldiers do some wrong things of course but there is a very clear difference between them and terrorists. Soldiers set out to uphold the law whereas terrorists set out to maim and murder. They should be treated differently." Kemp was questioned by police in 2000 concerning his suspected role in the murder of a prominent Republican figure during the 1980s, but charges were not brought against him.

Kemp is a member of the advisory board of Veterans for Britain, which campaigned strongly during the 2016 referendum for the UK to leave the European Union.

In 2015, Kemp spoke out in support of granting asylum in the UK to Afghan interpreters who had worked with British armed forces.

Kemp criticised the findings of the 2014 UN Commission of Inquiry Report on Gaza, calling it "flawed and dangerous". His analysis was strongly critiqued by Richard Falk, former U.N. Special Rapporteur on Palestine, who accused Kemp of ignoring and misinterpreting international law.

Kemp was involved in the "Honour the Brave" campaign led by the Daily Mirror in 2007 and 2008 to recognise the sacrifice of British troops killed or wounded in action by the award of a medal similar to the US Purple Heart.

In October 2013 British media reported that Kemp may be on an Al-Qaeda death list. Kemp featured alongside others who have spoken out against Islamist terrorism on a video released by the Al Qaeda group al-Shabaab, which was responsible for an attack on a Nairobi shopping mall in 2013. The video included a clip from the BBC TV programme HARDtalk of Kemp condemning the murder of Fusilier Drummer Lee Rigby in Woolwich. The al-Shabaab urged UK Islamists to copy the murder. The Daily Mirror reported that anti-terrorist police had discussed with Kemp this death threat and concerns over his security.

Kemp has consistently criticised efforts by the British Army to increase gender and ethnic diversity. In 2014 he expressed his strong opposition to the proposal to end the policy prohibition on women serving in ground close combat roles, stating that women lack "ferocity, aggression and killer instinct". Writing in The Daily Telegraph in 2016, he alleged that the decision to allow women access to all armed forces roles was driven by "feminist zealots and ideologues hell-bent on equality of opportunity without exception" and that "through no fault of their own, women will often become the weak link in an infantry team. The men will have to take up the slack". Kemp was critical of the army's 2018 recruitment advertising campaign, "This is Belonging", stating that "The army, like the rest of government, is being forced down a route of political correctness ... What is most important is that the army is full of soldiers. It is of secondary importance that they reflect the composition of society."

On 1 August 2017, The Times published an article by Kemp claiming that Islamic State forces were attempting to infiltrate the British armed forces, stating that "The understandable drive by the armed forces and police to recruit more Muslims, and a less understandable concern for ticking the politically correct box over operational effectiveness, combine into an unprecedented danger." The article was condemned for stigmatising all young Muslims as "potential terrorists" and undermining attempts to increase diversity in the British armed forces.

Kemp has defended the continued enlistment of 16 and 17-year olds by the British armed forces, despite criticism of the policy from child rights organisations, arguing that the recruitment policy "unquestionably boosts the quality and fighting effectiveness of the armed forces".

On 11 March 2015, Kemp visited the University of Sydney to deliver a lecture on "Ethical Dilemmas of Military Tactics" and the complexities in dealing with violent non-state actors such as ISIL. This lecture was interrupted by a group of pro-Palestinian demonstrators led by associate professor Jake Lynch, the director of the university's Centre for Peace and Conflict Studies. Following a heated exchange between the protesters and audience members, the pro-Palestinian protesters were evicted by security guards. In response to the incident, Kemp wrote a letter to the University of Sydney criticising Lynch's behaviour and accusing the latter of antisemitism. The University of Sydney later commenced an investigation into the incident.

In April 2017, a column written by Kemp and published in the Jewish News suggested that Baroness Warsi had sought to excuse the conduct of the Islamic State group. The Jewish News was subsequently ordered to pay £20,000 in damages plus costs to Warsi. In its public apology, the Jewish News stated

In a column written by Colonel Richard Kemp published in the Jewish News and jewishnews.co.uk on 6 April 2017, it was suggested that Baroness Sayeeda Warsi has sought to excuse the appalling conduct of the barbaric Islamic State terror group. The column also suggested that Baroness Warsi has objected to action being taken against British Muslims who murder and rape for Islamic State. We wish to make absolutely clear that these allegations were wholly untrue and should never have been published.

Warsi donated the damages to a charity for Muslim and Jewish women. Kemp himself did not issue an apology, and was accused by Warsi of appearing "to wantonly publish inflammatory and offensive comments without a thought for the consequences (let alone the truth)."

On 23 July 2018, The Daily Telegraph published an article by Kemp which argued that after its departure from the European Union, Britain should re-instate the death penalty for terrorism suspects.

In July 2017 he received criticism for his usage of the term "taig", a racial slur for Catholics of Irish descent, during an exchange on Twitter, including from former Labour MP and British Army officer Eric Joyce who questioned if he knew it was a "racist term of abuse". In his defence, Kemp mentioned that he is a practising Catholic and, having often been subject to the term as a result, he did not consider it a term of abuse.

In 2023, Kemp expressed support for Israel's actions in the Gaza Strip during the Gaza war.

== Honours and awards ==
Kemp was appointed Member of the Order of the British Empire (MBE), Military Division, on 25 April 1994 in recognition of his intelligence work in Northern Ireland in 1993, and was awarded the Queen's Commendation for Bravery for service as a commander in the United Nations Protection Force in Bosnia in 1994. He was promoted Commander of the Order of the British Empire (CBE), Military Division, in the New Year Honours 2006. He received an honorary doctorate from Bar-Ilan University in 2015.
