= Philip Zec =

British political cartoonist and editor

Philip Zec (25 December 1909 – 14 July 1983) was a British political cartoonist and editor. Moving from the advertising industry to drawing political cartoons due to his abhorrence of the rise of fascism, Zec complemented the Daily Mirror editorial line with a series of venomous cartoons. He was on the Nazis list of persons to be arrested immediately if they had invaded Britain during the Second World War. His cartoon on VE-day was said to have been a key factor in the Labour Party's 1945 general election campaign.

== Early life ==
Zec was born in George Street (subsequently North Gower Street), central London, one of eleven children of Simon Zecanovskya, a Russian Jewish tailor from Odessa who, together with his family, had fled oppression in Tsarist Russia.

At thirteen Zec won a scholarship to the Saint Martin's School of Art and, upon graduating, initially joined Arks Publicity, an agency specialising in advertising for radio companies, before establishing his own commercial art studio at only 19 working for advertising agencies including J. Walter Thompson. While working there he drew an illustration of the Flying Scotsman travelling at top speed at night.

== Daily Mirror ==
In the early-1930s, the Daily Mirror was relaunched along the lines of an American-style tabloid. Zec's former copy-editor at Arks Publicity, William Connor, who was working for the paper, recommended Zec (who had been doing occasional work for the paper including on "Belinda Blue-Eyes", a copy of the New York News’ cartoon strip “Little Orphan Annie” and scripted by Connor) for the role of political cartoonist. Zec joined the staff of the Mirror in 1937.

Zec had no previous experience of drawing cartoons but was hired by H. G. Bartholomew and given complete creative freedom without editorial censorship. Working alongside Connor, who went under the pen-name "Cassandra", Zec was to provide cartoons to accompany "Cassandra’s" column. With Connor occasionally providing captions for Zec's drawings, the outbreak of war in 1939 provided the dominant influence in his work during this period.

Unlike the early war time cartoons of David Low and others, Zec depicted the Nazi regime as snakes and vultures, implying a sinister side in contrast to the "buffoons" drawn by his peers. Zec also extended his caricatures to the allies of Hitler, drawing Pierre Laval as a toad at a time when the Frenchman was looking to associate more closely with Hitler. Commentators have since ascribed this approach to a strong anti-Nazi sentiment borne out of Zec's Jewish ancestry. It is said the feeling was mutual and that Adolf Hitler had placed Zec on his "black list" of individuals to be arrested following an invasion of Britain.

In 1941, Zec designed the iconic propaganda poster "Women of Britain - Come Into the Factories."

== "The price of petrol" ==
A cartoon by Zec published in 1942 caused a political furore that threatened the existence of the Daily Mirror and caused him to be labelled a traitor. Appearing in the 6 March 1942 edition, the cartoon featured a Merchant Navy seaman adrift in rough waters clinging to the remains of a ship, apparently torpedoed by a German submarine. Beneath the picture, the caption read: "The price of petrol has been increased by one penny – Official."

One of a series of pieces attacking profiteers, the original caption penned by Zec was to have been "Petrol is Dearer Now." According to Zec, the cartoon was intended to illustrate that wasting fuel had serious consequences in terms of the risks taken (and the lives lost) by seamen bringing it to the country. William Connor (pen name "Cassandra") suggested the revised caption, believing Zec's effort lacked impact. Prime Minister Winston Churchill and Minister of Supply Herbert Morrison along with others in the government were outraged. They interpreted the cartoon as a comment that petrol companies were deliberately profiting at the expense of British lives - particularly those in the merchant navy. The cartoon was resurrected some 40 years later by Les Gibbard - with similar political consequences - as Great Britain again found itself at war.

Morrison called Zec's piece a "wicked cartoon... worthy of Goebbels at his best" and telling the Mirror's editor, Cecil Thomas, that "only a very unpatriotic editor could pass it for publication". Ernest Bevin, Minister of Labour, argued that Zec's work lowered the morale of the armed forces and the general public.

Churchill called on MI5 to investigate Zec's background, which revealed nothing more sinister than the fact he had left-wing sympathies and found no evidence of him being involved in subversion. At the same time the Mirror's register of shareholders was investigated to consider whether the paper should be shut down. The matter was debated in the House of Commons and, after MPs urged caution, the government settled on a severe reprimand.

== "Don't lose it again" ==
Three years later, Zec's VE Day contribution was widely appreciated. Depicting a wounded soldier handing over a laurel representing victory and peace in Europe, the caption read: "Here you are. Don't lose it again!"

The cartoon had sufficient impact for Herbert Morrison to ask Zec to help with Labour publicity for the 1945 General Election with the politician dismissing his comments just three years previously on the premise that: "everybody makes mistakes", Zec obtained a belated apology and, as a result on the morning of the election "Don't lose it again!’" was reprinted taking up the entire front page of the Mirror. The accompanying text suggested that the best way for the country to remain at peace was to vote for the Labour Party.

== Post-war ==
After the war Zec became a director of the Daily Mirror and eventually joined the board of the Mirror Group. Between 1950 and 1952, he was employed as editor of the Sunday Pictorial while continuing to draw for the Daily Mirror until he left in 1954, succeeded in the role of cartoonist by Victor Weisz, or 'Vicky' as he was better known. In 1958, Zec left the Mirror Group altogether, and moved to the Daily Herald, remaining there until 1961. Zec also worked as a director of The Jewish Chronicle for 25 years and was the editor of the New Europe newspaper.

== Death and legacy ==
Becoming blind in later life, Philip Zec died in the Middlesex Hospital, London, on 14 July 1983.

In 2005, a biography by his brother, Donald Zec, was published under the title "Don't Lose It Again!", recalling the caption to Philip Zec's VE Day cartoon.

Media offices
Preceded by Hugh Cudlipp	Editor of the Sunday Pictorial; 1949–1952	Succeeded by Hugh Cudlipp
