= Tony Miles (disambiguation) =

Tony Miles (1955–2001) was an English chess Grandmaster.

Tony Miles or Anthony Miles may also refer to:

- Tony Miles (Canadian football) (born 1978), former Canadian football player
- Tony Miles (journalist) (1930–2018), former British newspaper editor
- Tony Miles (poker player), American poker player
- Anthony Miles (Australian footballer) (born 1992), Australian footballer for Gold Coast, formerly for GWS and Richmond
- Anthony Miles (basketball) (born 1989), American basketball player
