= William Connor =

English newspaper journalist (1909–1967)

- Born: 26 April 1909; England
- Died: 6 April 1967 (aged 57)
- Other name: Cassandra (pen name)
- Occupation: Newspaper journalist
- Years active: 1935–1967
- Known for: Columnist for the Daily Mirror

Sir William Neil Connor (26 April 1909 – 6 April 1967) was an English newspaper journalist for the Daily Mirror who wrote under the pen name of "Cassandra".

== Biography ==
William Connor wrote a regular column for over 30 years between 1935 and 1 February 1967 with a short intermission for the Second World War, his column restarting after the war with the words "As I was saying before I was so rudely interrupted, it is a powerful hard thing to please all of the people all of the time." He took his pen-name from Cassandra in Greek mythology, a tragic character who is given the gift of prophecy by Apollo but is then cursed so that no one will ever believe her.

The very popular column helped the Mirror's readership to grow to the highest in its history during the 1950s. His columns were simply written, in keeping with his working class readership, and comprised slices of human life, including famous people, events and later a personal diary of his everyday life and thoughts – though at times he could be controversial. He worked alongside cartoonist Philip Zec at the Daily Mirror and the pair courted controversy in 1942 with an illustration, captioned by Connor, which Winston Churchill and others perceived as an attack on government. Churchill complained to Cecil King, then a director of the company, of a writer (Connor) being "dominated by malevolence". Connor forgave Churchill though, and later wrote a moving obituary of the wartime Prime Minister ("Sword in the Scabbard", 25 January 1965) and attended his funeral service at St Paul's Cathedral.

In his best known columns, Connor said the author P. G. Wodehouse was a Nazi collaborator, a charge from which George Orwell defended Wodehouse, and in 1956 he strongly suggested that the entertainer Liberace was a homosexual. The suggestion was true, but Liberace sued for libel (Liberace v Daily Mirror) and won in 1959. During the case both Connor and Liberace lied under oath.

According to Roy Greenslade, Connor was "an odd mix of liberal and reactionary", citing for the former his column attacking the enactment of the death sentence delivered to Ruth Ellis due on the day of its publication. He wrote: "The one thing that brings stature and dignity to mankind and raises us above the beasts will have been denied her – pity and the hope of ultimate redemption."

In the years leading up to his death, Connor wrote more humorous columns and was regarded with affection by Mirror readers. Subjects ranged from the times he received wrong number calls intended for a nearby railway goods station, to the mysterious person who sent him a fresh goose egg once a year.

Connor was knighted in 1966. His final column ended with the words "Normal service in this column is temporarily interrupted while I learn to do what any babe can do with ease and what comes naturally to most men of good conscience – to sleep easily o' nights."

He died aged 57 in hospital, a month after fracturing his skull in a fall.

Since his death, the column Cassandra in the Daily Mirror has continued to be sporadically published. A new columnist, Keith Waterhouse, took over Connor's place in the newspaper, but not his byline.
