= Daily Mirror Silver Cup =

1910 series of American football games in England

The Daily Mirror Silver Cup was a series of American football games, played by US Navy Servicemen in Great Britain in 1910. The Daily Mirror became the title sponsor.

== 1st Daily Mirror Silver Cup ==
The first game was on Thanksgiving Day November 23. It was to be played at Crystal Palace between the USS Idaho (Navy’s Division III champions) and the USS Michigan (Division I champions). However, the Michigan team pulled out of the game and was replaced by a team from the USS Vermont. The team from the USS Idaho won 19-0 in front of a crowd of 10,000, collecting the Daily Mirror Silver Cup from the Duke of Manchester.

== 2nd Daily Mirror Silver Cup ==
The second game was on December 3, also at Crystal palace. This was to be the American Navy Football final between the USS Idaho and the USS Connecticut. Organised by Rear Admiral Seaton Schroeder the final was a much more serious affair, but the Idaho team won again 5-0 in front of a crowd of 12,000. This time the Duchess of Marlborough presented the Cup.

== 3rd Daily Mirror Silver Cup ==
The third and final game of the tour was on December 24, between the USS Georgia and the USS Rhode Island at Northfleet in Kent. USS Georgia defeated USS Rhode Island 12-0 at Stonebridge Road, in front of a crowd of 4,000.
