= Liberace v Daily Mirror =

1959 English libel case

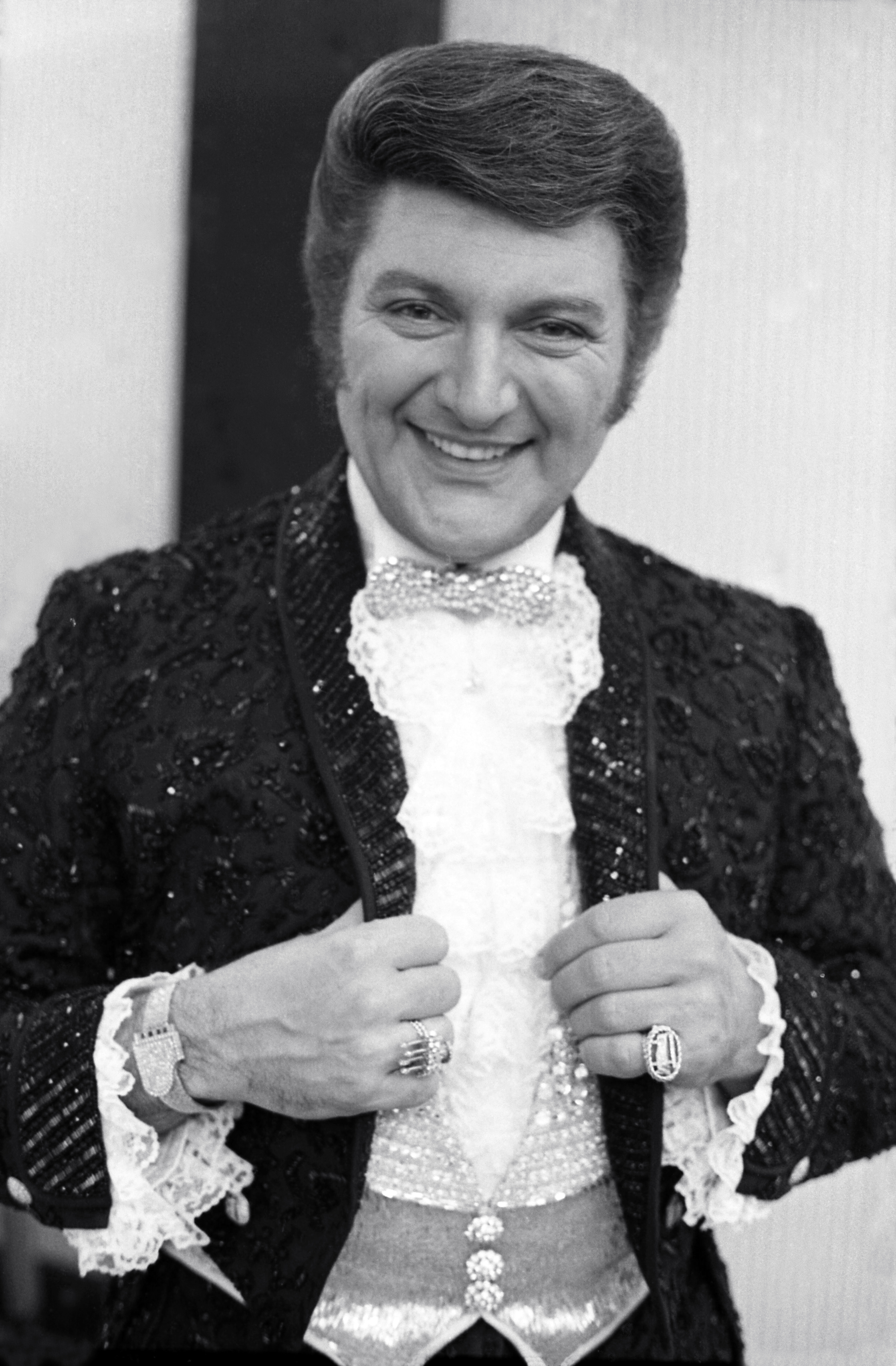
Entertainer Liberace (pictured) was awarded £8,000 in damages for an article strongly hinting he was a homosexual.

Liberace v Daily Mirror is a 1959 English legal case in which the American entertainer Liberace sued the Daily Mirror columnist William Connor for libel after Connor, who while writing under the pen name Cassandra, published an article strongly hinting that he was a homosexual. At the time homosexual sex was illegal in the United Kingdom. Liberace was successful in the action and was awarded £8,000. The award, equivalent to £162,000 in 2025, was the largest libel settlement for any case in British legal history to that date. The Argus has described the case as "one of the most sensational libel trials of the century".

== Facts ==
The libel action related to a 1956 article Connor wrote describing Liberace as

"...the summit of sex - the pinnacle of masculine, feminine and neuter. Everything that he, she and it can ever want... a deadly, winking, sniggering, snuggling, chromium-plated, scent-impregnated, luminous, quivering, giggling, fruit-flavoured, mincing, ice-covered heap of mother love."

The case partly hinged on the use of the term "fruit-flavoured" as fruit is an American slang term for a homosexual. Connor denied he was familiar with this usage. In court Liberace denied he was gay stating "I am against the practice because it offends convention and it offends society".

== Aftermath ==
Following his award for damages, Liberace joked in a telegram that "I cried all the way to the bank". Liberace continued to maintain that he was not a homosexual throughout his life.

Liberace was involved in further litigation in 1982 when Scott Thorson, Liberace's 22-year-old former chauffeur, sued the pianist for $113 million in palimony after he was let go by Liberace. Liberace again denied that he was homosexual and, during court depositions in 1984, he insisted that Thorson was never his lover. The case was settled out of court in 1986.

== See also ==
- English defamation law
