= Hamilton Fyfe =

British journalist and writer

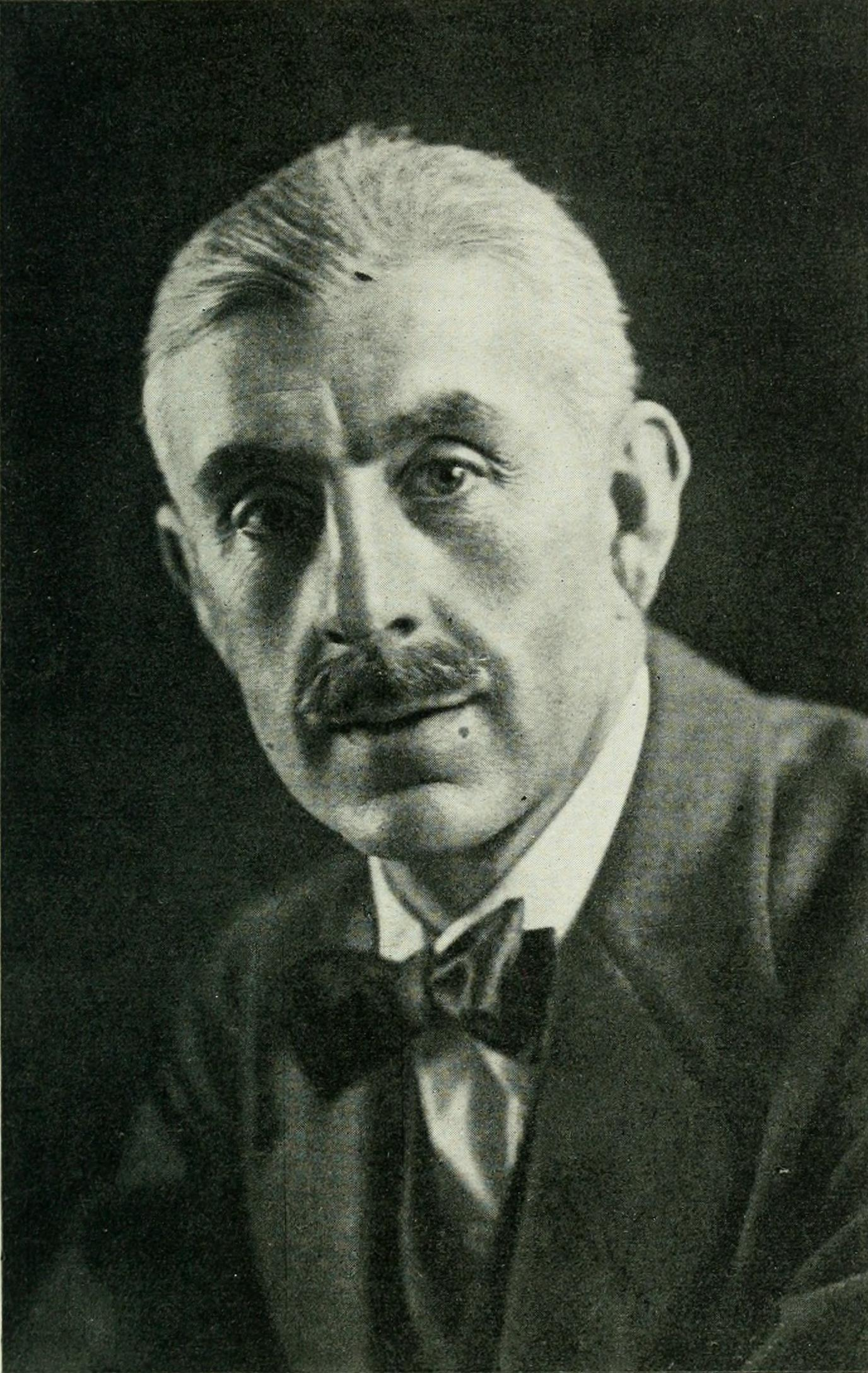
- Born: 10 June 1869; London, England
- Died: 15 July 1951 (aged 82); Eastbourne, East Sussex, England
- Occupation(s): Journalist and editor
- Spouse: Eleanor Kelly
- Relatives: William Hamilton Fyfe (brother)

Henry Hamilton Fyfe (29 September 1869 – 15 June 1951) was a British journalist and writer who was editor of both the newspapers the Daily Mirror and the Daily Herald.

== Career ==
Born in London, and educated at Fettes College, Edinburgh. Fyfe was the son of James Hamilton Fyfe, a barrister and journalist, and his wife Mary. He joined the staff of The Times at seventeen, where he worked as a reporter and reviewer before becoming secretary to the editor, George Earle Buckle. In 1902 he became editor of the Morning Advertiser, the trade publication of the Licensed Victuallers' Association. Though his attempts to improve the paper soon brought him into conflict with the paper's owners, the disputes attracted the attention of the press tycoon Alfred Harmsworth, who offered Fyfe the opportunity to transform the struggling Daily Mirror the next year. Fyfe accepted Harmsworth's offer, and converted the paper from a publication catering for women readers into a popular newspaper by the use of photojournalism.

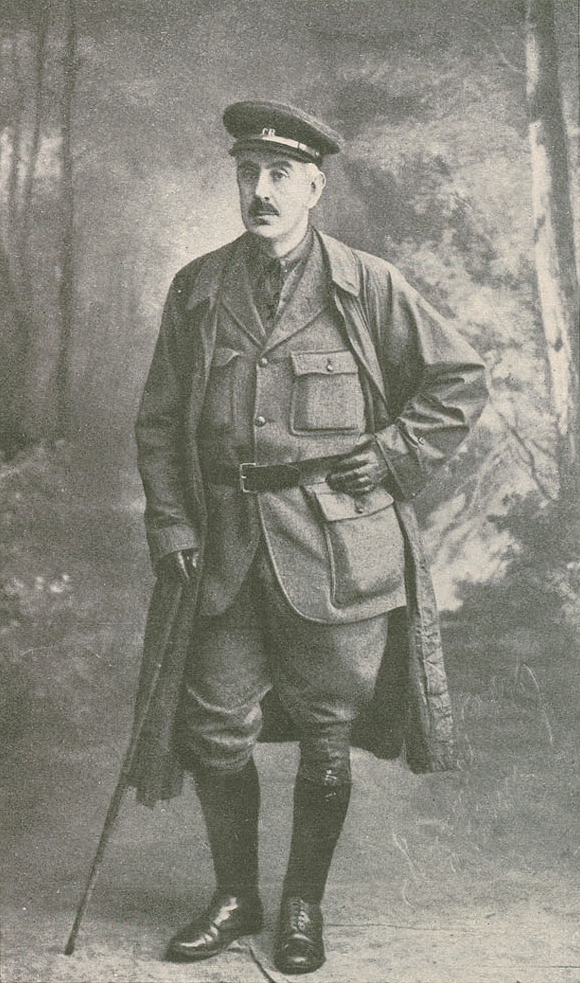
Fyfe in uniform during World War I

In 1907 Fyfe ended his editorship of the Daily Mirror to become a reporter for another Harmsworth publication, the Daily Mail. He gained considerable renown during this period, initially by covering aviation feats such as Louis Blériot's successful crossing of the English Channel. He also covered Venustiano Carranza's overthrow of the Huerta regime in Mexico as well as the growing tension in Ulster in 1914. At the start of the First World War he was sent to France, where he scored further success early on with his reports of the Great Retreat from Mons. During the war, he filed reports from Russia, Spain, Portugal, and Italy, before aiding Harmsworth (by now Lord Northcliffe) in his propaganda efforts for the British government.

Fyfe's 1920 play The Kingdom, The Power and The Glory provoked controversy because of its criticisms of monarchy.

A political leftist, Fyfe nonetheless liked the conservative Northcliffe and enjoyed a good relationship with him until the latter's mental deterioration after the war. After Northcliffe's death in 1922, Fyfe agreed to edit the Daily Herald. During his tenure there, he succeeded in nearly quadrupling the paper's circulation but disputed with the editorial board, which was dominated by members of the Trades Union Congress. In 1926 he quit the editorship to accept a job as a reporter with the Daily Chronicle, working there until the newspaper's merger with the Daily News four years later. During this period, he campaigned unsuccessfully for Parliament as a Labour Party candidate, firstly for Sevenoaks in the general election of 1929 and then for Yeovil in 1931. Fyfe's 1940 book The Illusion of National Character was a critique of nationalism published by the Thinker's Library.

After he quit the Daily Chronicle, Fyfe concentrated on his independent writing. His success as a playwright dated to 1909 with the first performance of A Modern Aspasia; he also wrote a number of biographies of writers and journalists culminating in his own memoirs, Sixty Years of Fleet Street, which was published two years before his death at a nursing home in Sussex.

== See also ==
- Republicanism in the United Kingdom

Media offices
Preceded by F. G. Doney	Editor of the Morning Advertiser; 1902–1903	Succeeded by G. W. Talbot
Preceded by Mary Howarth	Editor of the Daily Mirror; 1903-1907	Succeeded by Alexander Kenealy
Preceded by William Patrick Ryan	Editor of the Daily Herald; 1922-1926	Succeeded by William Mellor
