= Desmond Ryan =

Irish writer, historian, and revolutionary

Desmond Ryan (1893–1964) was an Irish writer, historian, and in his earlier life a revolutionary in Sinn Féin.

== Life ==
Ryan was born in London, on 27 August 1893, son of the Templemore, County Tipperary-born London journalist William Patrick Ryan, editor of the Peasant and Irish Nation and assistant editor of the London Daily Herald, and his wife, Elizabeth. He came to Ireland in 1906, aged 13, with his mother and sister, and studied at St Enda's School, Rathfarnham, under headmaster and founder Padraig Pearse; later he taught in the school and was briefly Pearse's secretary.

Ryan attributed to Pearse the saying "[G]ive me a hundred men and I will free Ireland!" Ryan became part of a group of former students lodging in St Enda's while they went to university who joined the Irish Republican Brotherhood. They used to meet in a safe house at Rathfarnham in 1911. The men took the tram from Rathfarnham to Nelson's Pillar in Central Dublin. Pearse once told his friend, "Let them talk! I am the most dangerous revolutionary of the whole lot of them!" In 1911, the Dungannon Clubs would revive the Volunteers Militia movement. These clubs were not initially successful in Dublin, but were more so in Belfast amongst nationalists. One of the northern members the Dubliner Oscar Traynor, in his youth a professional footballer with Belfast Celtic F.C., later a war hero and later again a politician and Minister for Posts and Telegraphs.

At this stage, according to Ryan, Pearse was a constitutional nationalist who spoke for Home Rule from a platform shared with Tom Kettle and John Redmond, and refused to hear any criticism of the Irish Parliamentary Party. But on the foundation of the Ulster Volunteer Force by Edward Carson and the approach of World War I, Pearse became increasingly sure that Ireland could not achieve independence except by force, and began with Thomas MacDonagh, Éamonn Ceannt, Joseph Plunkett, Thomas Clarke, Bulmer Hobson and others to plan the Rising.

Eoin MacNeill was appointed leader of the Irish Volunteers; Ryan wrote that Pearse told him MacNeill was "too tactful" — Pearse was a risk-taker and idealist; MacNeill was prepared to entertain the Irish Parliamentary Party with negotiations. Ryan quotes Pearse as saying:

[MacNeill] has the reputation of being tactful, but his tact consists in bowing to the will of the Redmondites every time. He never makes a fight except when they assail his personal honour, when he bridles up at once... very delicate position... he is weak, hopelessly weak.

He told Ryan that MacNeill was "a Grattan come to life again". Henry Grattan was a constitutional orator and MP in the Protestant-only 18th-century Irish House of Commons, but one of those who fiercely opposed the notorious 1801 Act of Union, secured by massive bribery (which was then repaid out of Irish taxes), making Ireland part of the United Kingdom. Moreover, MacNeill was an "inconclusive ditherer"; he wanted the Irish Volunteers to be apolitical.

The Easter Rising was preceded by the revelation of the "Castle Document", a plan by the British government to arrest the leaders of the Irish Volunteers and Irish Citizen Army and other radicals. Ryan claimed that this document, presented to MacNeill on the Wednesday before the Rising and said to have been stolen from high-ranking British staff in Dublin Castle, was a forgery. It has been claimed that it was concocted by Joseph Plunkett with the implicit approval of Catholic Archbishop Cullen of Dublin, a sympathiser with Dublin Castle and Redmond's war stratagem. "Forgery is a strong word," Ryan said, "but that in its final form the document was a forgery no doubt can exist whatever". Modern interpretation from Charles Townshend has judged the document to be genuine, and the opinion attributed to the Archbishop's Palace as circumstantial. Grace Gifford, Plunkett's widow, said that she was with Plunkett when he deciphered it at Larkfield House. Prior to his execution, Seán Mac Diarmada was met by a priest, and made the assumptive response that it was a fraudulent document.

Ryan fought through the Easter Rising from 24 March 1916 in the GPO under murderous artillery fire, and describes the battle vividly in his witness statement to the Bureau of Military History; he describes the garrison retreating to Moore Street and quotes Pearse's sculptor brother Willie Pearse, who would be executed a few days later, as saying "Connolly has been asked out to negotiate. They have decided to go to save the men from slaughter, for slaughter it is."

Ryan fought in the War of Independence, and afterwards wrote about his experiences; however, the Civil War which followed from June 1922 to April 1923 repelled him; he could not accept that Irishmen would fight Irishmen.

He returned to his studies in University College Dublin, and after taking his BA followed his father into journalism, working for the Freeman's Journal. In 1922, he moved to London to work on the Daily Herald. He wrote books on Pearse, James Connolly, Éamon de Valera, Seán Treacy and John Devoy, and on Fenianism as well as writing on the Rising and the War of Independence.

He married Sarah Hartley in 1933. In 1939 they returned to Ireland, where he edited the Torch, a Labour paper. Finding his views at odds with the Labour Party's official line, publication ceased in 1944. Husband and wife then moved to Swords in north County Dublin, where they ran a poultry farm. Desmond Ryan died on 23 December 1964.

== Writings ==
- The Man Called Pearse (1919)
- James Connolly: His Life, Work and Writings (1924)
- Remembering Sion (London 1934)
- Unique Dictator: A Study of Eamon de Valera (London 1936)
- Sean Treacy and the Third Tipperary Brigade, IRA (Tralee 1945)
- The Rising: The Complete Story of Easter Week (Dublin 1949)
- Michael Collins and the invisible army (1932, reprinted 1968)
- The Phoenix Flame: a study of Fenianism and John Devoy (1937)
- The sword of light: from the four masters to Douglas Hyde 1636–1938 (1939)
- The 1916 Poets (1963)
- The Fenian Chief: A biography of James Stephens (1967)

== Editor ==
- The Story of a Success (by PH Pearse with a concluding chapter by Ryan) 1917
- Socialism and Nationalism (1948)
- Labour and Easter Week (1949)
- The workers' republic (1951)
- Devoy's post bag (with William O'Brien) (1948, 1953)
- Pearse: Collected Works (1924)

== Translation ==
- Patrick H Pearse by Louis Le Roux (1932)
