= Silvester Bolam =

British newspaper editor (1905–1953)

Silvester Bolam (23 October 1905 – 27 April 1953) was a British newspaper editor.

Born in Tynemouth, Northumberland, Bolam studied at the University of Durham's Armstrong College before joining the Newcastle Journal. He then moved to work for the News Chronicle, and in 1936 became a sub-editor on the Daily Mirror. Although he left in 1938 to rejoin the News Chronicle, he returned ten months later, and in 1948 became the newspaper's editor.

As editor, Bolam focused on a strategy of sensationalism, and was able to make the Mirror Britain's best-selling daily newspaper. In March 1949, after publishing material which might have prejudiced the trial of John George Haigh (later convicted of murder), he was jailed for three months for contempt of court. The Daily Mirror also fined £10,000.

By 1953, he had fallen out with the paper's editorial director and resigned. He died a few months later.

Media offices
Preceded by Cecil Thomas	Editor of the Daily Mirror; 1949–1953	Succeeded by Jack Nener
