= Blind Date (1959 film) =

British murder mystery by Joseph Losey

- A film poster bearing the U.S. title: Chance Meeting
- Directed by: Joseph Losey
- Written by: Leigh Howard (novel); Ben Barzman; Millard Lampell
- Produced by: David Deutsch; Luggi Waldleitner
- Starring: Hardy Krüger; Stanley Baker; Micheline Presle
- Cinematography: Christopher Challis
- Edited by: Reginald Mills
- Music by: Richard Rodney Bennett
- Production company: Independent Artists
- Distributed by: Rank Film Distributors
- Release date: August 1959; (UK)
- Running time: 90-96 minutes
- Country: United Kingdom
- Language: English
- Budget: £138,000
- Box office: £120,000 (UK)

Blind Date (U.S. title: Chance Meeting) is a 1959 British murder mystery film directed by Joseph Losey and starring Hardy Krüger, Stanley Baker, and Micheline Presle. It was written by Ben Barzman and Millard Lampell based on the 1955 novel Blind Date by Leigh Howard.

== Plot ==
Jan Van Rooyer, a young Dutch artist, working in a London private art gallery, cheerfully arrives at the large mews flat owned by Jacqueline Cousteau. The door is open and he goes in and has a drink and puts on a loud jazz record. Around 20 minutes later uniformed police arrive and start questioning him. Inspector Morgan arrives soon after. They have had a phone call from the flat and on investigation, Jacqueline is found dead in the bedroom – so Jan has much explaining to do. He explains the relationship in a series of vignettes. They had met in the gallery and she had asked for private lessons in his studio. She tells him she is married, but when she starts to model for him, they become lovers, despite their age difference and very different social backgrounds.

The investigation finds little evidence of his innocence but it proves that Jacqueline had more than one lover. During the police search, Jan had pocketed an envelope of cash in the flat with his name on it. The inspector finds it and the £500 inside is concluded to be a "pay off". However, “Jacqueline” rematerialises. The dead woman in the flat is a nightclub singer and not her. “Jacqueline” is married to a high ranking public figure: Lord Fenton. The police reveal the dead woman is her husband's mistress, Jacqueline Cousteau. The wife had assumed her identity, then killed her.

== Cast ==
- Hardy Krüger as Jan Van Rooyer
- Stanley Baker as Inspector David Evan Morgan
- Micheline Presle as "Jacqueline Cousteau" (Lady Fenton)
- John Van Eyssen as Inspector Westover
- Gordon Jackson as uniformed Police Sergeant
- Robert Flemyng as Sir Brian Lewis
- Jack MacGowran as postman
- Redmond Phillips as Police Doctor
- George Roubicek as Police Constable
- Lee Montague as Sergeant Farrow

== Production ==
Virginia McKenna turned down the part of Lady Fenton. Losey wanted the part of the police officer to go to Peter O'Toole but it was offered to Stanley Baker, who would go on to make several films with Losey.

Losey says John Davis of Rank wanted references to the corruption of the police and the class system to be removed but the filmmakers held firm and changes were not made.

The film was one of Stanley Baker's favourites.

The film was shot from March to May 1959. The budget comprised £40,000 put up by the German producer and £98,000 provided by Sydney Box Associates.

== Reception ==
=== Box office ===
Sydney Box has stated that he sold the film to Paramount in the US for twice what it cost, putting it in profit, although another source says Box sold it for cost. In the UK the film made a profit of £160,000. Kinematograph Weekly reported it "did well" at the British box office.

=== Critical reception ===
The New York Times Eugene Archer found the film "absorbing", noting that "Joseph Losey proves himself a strikingly adept technician with an alert and caustic personal style." The Monthly Film Bulletin wrote: "Some unusually pointed and intelligent dialogue exchanges, notably in the love scenes, an adroit dovetailing of flashbacks and direct action, give a routine thriller plot a certain edge and intensity." Variety called it "taut, well written".

The Manchester Guardian described the film as "a well-made and intriguing if far-fetched 'whodunnit' in which the love story, leading to the murder, is more real than cosy."

Filmkink felt Losey worked "a lot more effectively for Rank than on The Gentleman and The Gypsy, presumably because he was at more arms' length from the studio."

Leslie Halliwell said: "Tolerable, comparatively sophisticated murder puzzle: rather glum-looking, but the plot holds the interest."

The Radio Times Film Guide to Films gave the film 3/5 stars, writing: "This usually overlooked entry in the Joseph Losey canon is actually quite a daring and sophisticated investigation into British attitudes towards sex, class and the establishment in the late 1950s. The story is pretty unremarkable but Losey's assured handling of character and location forces you to share the plight of Dutch painter Hardy Krüger."

== Retrospective appraisal ==
"[T]he efforts of Losey and his collaborators to make the story credible give the film a richness, a multi-layered complexity, and thus a range of thematic, social and political resonance..."—Critic James Leahy in Senses of Cinema (2002)

Biographer Foster Hirsch reports that the film garnered "strong reviews in both England and America." Subsequent to Chance Meeting (titled Blind Date in England) Losey's reputation for creating "cult" movies emerged in Great Britain.

Characterizing the film as "a thinking man's thriller," Hirsch adds: "The murder-mystery genre serves as a platform for Losey's cynical statements about the British class system" as well as an indictment of "corruption and influence" in Scotland Yard.

Film historian James Leahy in Senses of Cinema, declares: "As far as I'm concerned, Blind Date is the most underrated of Losey's films..."

== Awards ==
Barzman and Lampell were nominated for the BAFTA Award for Best British Screenplay.

== Sources ==
- Leahy, James. 2002. Losey Revisited. Senses of Cinema, July 2002. Director: Joseph Losey Issue 21https://www.sensesofcinema.com/2002/director-joseph-losey/losey_revisited/ Accessed 10 October, 2024.
- Hirsch, Foster. 1980. Joseph Losey. Twayne Publishers, Boston, Massachusetts. ISBN 0-8057-9257-0
- Palmer, James and Riley, Michael. 1993. The Films of Joseph Losey. Cambridge University Press, Cambridge, England. ISBN 0-521-38386-2
