= Leigh Brownlee =

English cricketer (1882–1955)

Personal information
- Full name: Leigh Dunlop Brownlee
- Born: 17 December 1882; Redland, Bristol, England
- Died: 22 September 1955 (aged 72); Clifton, Bristol, England
- Batting: Right-handed
- Bowling: Right-arm slow
- Role: Batsman
- Relatives: Brother, Wilfred

Domestic team information
- Years: Team
- 1901–09: Gloucestershire
- 1902–04: Oxford University
- 1902: Somerset
- First-class debut: 26 August 1901 Gloucestershire v Somerset
- Last First-class: 26 June 1909 Gloucestershire v Surrey

Career statistics
Competition	First-class
Matches	82
Runs scored	1946
Batting average	14.63
100s/50s	1/5
Top score	103
Balls bowled	699
Wickets	15
Bowling average	27.06
5 wickets in innings	–
10 wickets in match	–
Best bowling	3/40
Catches/stumpings	63/–
- Source: CricketArchive, 26 June 2011

Leigh Dunlop Brownlee (17 December 1882 – 22 September 1955) was a journalist who became editor of the Daily Mirror from 1931 to 1934. He also played first-class cricket for Gloucestershire, Oxford University and Somerset between 1901 and 1909. He was born at Bristol and died at Clifton, also in Bristol.

== Cricket career ==
Educated at Clifton College, Brownlee was a right-handed middle- or lower-order batsman and an infrequent right-arm slow bowler, and was top of the Clifton batting averages in 1900. After leaving school in the summer of 1901, he made his first-class debut for Gloucestershire in two end-of-season matches, and in his first game, against Somerset at Taunton, he made 66 in the Gloucestershire second innings, though he was unable to prevent a Somerset victory with less than an hour of the scheduled match time remaining. A student at Oriel College, Oxford, from the autumn of 1901, he played in one match for the university cricket team in 1902, and in one match for Somerset against the university side – Somerset frequently "borrowed" university players for their matches against the university sides in the first third of the 20th century, but this game has an additional curiosity in that it is one of the few 12-a-side first-class matches. Though unable to break into the Oxford University side, Brownlee played regularly for Gloucestershire when the university term was over, and in the match against Kent at Bristol he scored 103 in the first innings, the only century of his first-class cricket career. In 1903, he was given half a dozen games for the university side but was not successful then, nor in 10 matches for Gloucestershire in the second half of the season: his batting average for the season as a whole was under 10 runs per innings, and his highest score in the season was just 43.

Brownlee had a better cricketing year in 1904. Despite never reaching 50 in an innings for Oxford's cricket team, he retained his place in the team through the university cricket season and won a Blue by appearing in the University Match against Cambridge University, though he made only 3 and 9 in his two innings in the match. He had a better season for Gloucestershire too than he had had in 1903, with a highest score of 97, batting at No 9 in the match against Kent. In addition to his success in winning a cricket Blue, Brownlee also won a Blue for golf in his last year at Oxford. Brownlee had a full season of first-class cricket in 1905, appearing in 16 matches for Gloucestershire, though he was not successful, scoring only 244 runs at an average of 10.16 and with a highest score of only 38.

From 1906 to 1909, Brownlee's journalism career came first and he appeared in just a handful of matches for Gloucestershire in each season, with only one further score of more than 50, an innings of 79 in the match against Northamptonshire in 1908. He did not play any further matches after 1909.

== Newspaperman ==
Brownlee went into newspapers and he is picked out as one of the senior figures representing the Daily Mirror at the funeral of the newspaper's then editor, Alexander Kenealy in 1915. Brownlee was himself editor of the Daily Mirror from 1931 to 1934, though this was a difficult period for the newspaper, which had fallen significantly from its achievement of the first one million circulation in 1918 because of price cutting by rival newspapers. The Mirror was sold by Lord Northcliffe in the mid-1930s and Brownlee appears to have left then: the newspaper relaunched as an American-style tabloid after he left. He went into partnership in a news agency, but the partnership was dissolved in 1936.
