= Cecil Thomas (journalist) =

British newspaper editor

Cecil Thomas (1883 – 26 October 1960) was a British newspaper editor.

Born in Newton-in-the-Isle in Cambridgeshire, Thomas was the younger brother of colonial administrator Shenton Thomas. Cecil became a journalist in 1908, and joined the Daily Mirror in 1910.

In 1934, Thomas was appointed as editor of the Mirror. He served during World War II, during which he became known for writing lengthy letters in the paper, described life at its headquarters. In 1942, he was called to the Home Office by Herbert Morrison, and threatened that the paper could be closed if it continued to publish articles considered detrimental to the war effort. He retired in 1948.

In his obituary in The Times, Thomas was described as "cherubic, courteous and unobtrusive", and in the Daily Mirror as "a tranquil man". In his spare time, he enjoyed painting.

Media offices
Preceded by Leigh Brownlee	Editor of the Daily Mirror; 1934–1948	Succeeded by Silvester Bolam
