= Jack Nener =

Welsh newspaper editor

- Born: 1902; Swansea, Wales
- Died: 1982 (aged 79–80)
- Education: Dynevor School; Swansea Technical College
- Occupations: Newspaper editor; journalist
- Years active: 1943–1960 (editor), 1960 onwards (associate editor)
- Employer(s): South Wales Evening Post; Western Mail; Cardiff Evening Express; Daily Mirror; Sunday Pictorial
- Known for: Editor of the Daily Mirror (1953–1960)
- Spouse: Audrey Whiting (m. 1954)

Jack Nener (1902 – 27 November 1982) was a Welsh newspaper editor.

Born in Swansea, Nener was educated at Dynevor School and Swansea Technical College. He became a journalist with the South Wales Evening Post then moved to the Western Mail and onto the Cardiff Evening Express. In 1943, he moved to London to become night editor and chief sub-editor on the Daily Mirror.

In 1953, Nener became editor of the Mirror, and the following year, he married Audrey Whiting, the paper's chief European correspondent. Under his editorship, the paper's sales increased to four million a day. However, in his obituary, the Mirror stated that "he didn't do it with charm. He wasn't a man to shrink from using two expletives when one would suffice".

Nener stood down as editor in 1960, but continued as associate editor, and also served on the board of the Sunday Pictorial. He died in 1982.

Media offices
Preceded by Silvester Bolam	Editor of the Daily Mirror; 1953–1960	Succeeded by Lee Howard
