= William Patrick Ryan =

Irish journalist

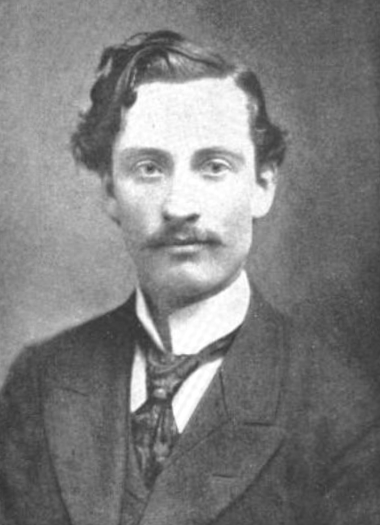
- In The Sketch, 20 April 1898
- Born: 25 October 1867; County Tipperary, Ireland
- Died: 31 December 1942 (aged 75); London, England
- Burial place: Camberwell Old Cemetery
- Occupations: Writer, journalist

William Patrick Ryan (1867–1942), was an Irish author and journalist.

== Biography ==
He was born near Templemore, County Tipperary on 25 October 1867. The early part of his career was spent in London, where he worked as a journalist. Upon returning to Ireland he began his own newspapers, titled Peasant and Irish Nation. He was condemned by Cardinal Michael Logue for his socialist views and returned to London in 1910. He was a member of the Gaelic League.

Ryan's son Desmond Ryan was the biographer of PH Pearse and Michael Collins and the memorialist of the Easter Rising, in which he fought.

Ryan died in London on 31 December 1942, and was buried at Camberwell Old Cemetery.

== Writings ==
- The Irish Literary Revival; Its History, Pioneers and Possibilities (1894)
- Literary London: Its Lights and Comedies (1898)
- The Plough and the Cross: A Story of New Ireland (1910)
- The Pope's Green Island (1912)
- The Celt and the Cosmos (1913)
- Labour Revolt and Larkinism (1913)
- The Irish Labor Movement: From The 'Twenties to Our Own Day (1920)
- Lessons from Modern Language Movements (1926)

Media offices
Preceded by George Lansbury	Editor of the Daily Herald; 1922	Succeeded by Hamilton Fyfe
