= Mary Howarth =

Mary Macfarlane Howarth (bapt. 10 March 1858 – after 1934) was a British journalist and newspaper editor.

She was the editor of the women's section for the Daily Mail in the late 1890s. In November 1903, she was appointed as the first editor of the Daily Mirror, then part of the same group.

Although sometimes described as the first female editor on Fleet Street, she was preceded by Delariviere Manley and Rachel Beer. Almost all the staff at the Mirror were women, proprietor Alfred Harmsworth saw it as a paper "for gentlewomen by gentlewomen".

The first issue sold a relatively healthy 276,000 copies, but was soon down to 25,000. Harmsworth lost confidence in his plan for the paper. According to him, "women can't write and don't want to read". He wrote to Hamilton Fyfe to offer him the job of editor. Fyfe replied, confirming that he would be happy to take up the post, as soon as he could resign as editor of the Morning Advertiser.

Howarth, apparently only on loan from the Mail, returned to her former job at the Mail after a week's publication. Fyfe took up the editorial post early in 1904, sacking almost all the female staff. He relaunched the paper with a focus on printing photographs of events.

Howarth continued to work as a journalist into the 1930s.

No other woman was editor-in-chief of the Mirror for over a century, until Alison Phillips took up the post in 2018.

== Personal life ==
Howarth was born in Manchester, the daughter of John Rowcroft Macfarlane and Harriette Anne Embleton.

She married civil engineer Osbert Henry Howarth in 1876 in Southport. They were the parents of writer Osbert John Radcliffe Howarth, who married Eleanor Mary Paget, daughter of Stephen Paget. After her first husband's death, she married Rev. George Herbert Nall in June 1909 at Westminster Abbey.

Media offices
Preceded by New position	Editor of the Daily Mirror; November 1903	Succeeded by Hamilton Fyfe
