= Thomas Langdon (cricketer) =

English cricketer

Thomas Langdon (8 January 1879 – 30 November 1944) was an English cricketer who played first-class cricket for Gloucestershire between 1900 and 1914. He was born at Brighton, Sussex, and died at Nuneaton, Warwickshire.
