= Leon Howard (Tennessee politician) =

American politician

Leonidas Howard Sr. (1849 – March 8, 1912), usually known as Leon Howard, was a laborer in Memphis, Tennessee who is believed to have been an ex-slave) and served one term as a member of the Tennessee House of Representatives for the 43rd General Assembly (1883–84). A Republican, he was African-American. He eventually moved to Bakersfield, California where he died at his home March 8, 1912.

== See also ==
- African Americans in Tennessee
- African American officeholders from the end of the Civil War until before 1900
