= Lee Howard (journalist) =

British newspaper editor (1914–1978)

Leon Alexander Lee Howard (1914–1978), known as Lee Howard, was a British newspaper editor.

Born in London, Howard was educated privately. He served with the Royal Air Force during World War II, initially as part of the Coastal Command, then later with the RAF Film Unit. During this time, he received the Distinguished Flying Cross.

Once demobbed, he worked in journalism, becoming editor of the women's section of the Daily Mirror in 1955, then editor of the Sunday Pictorial in 1959, and finally of the Daily Mirror itself in 1961, serving for ten years. He had planned to retire on turning sixty, but Hugh Cudlipp unexpectedly asked him to leave a year early.

In his spare time, Howard wrote four novels: Crispin's Day, Johnny's Sister, Blind Date (filmed 1959) and No Man Sings, under the pseudonym Leigh Howard.

Howard was married to Sheila Black, a journalist with the Financial Times. In retirement, he moved to Rome.

Media offices
Preceded by Colin Valdar	Editor of the Sunday Pictorial; 1959–1961	Succeeded by Reg Payne
Preceded by Jack Nener	Editor of the Daily Mirror; 1961–1971	Succeeded by Tony Miles
