= Daily Mirror =

British daily tabloid newspaper

- The Heart of Britain

- Front page on 16 December 2025
- Type: Daily newspaper
- Format: Red top
- Owner: Reach plc
- Editor: Chloe Hubbard
- Founded: 2 November 1903; 123 years ago
- Political alignment: Labour
- Headquarters: One Canada Square, London, United Kingdom
- Circulation: 175,928 (as of September 2025)
- OCLC number: 223228477
- Website: www.mirror.co.uk

The Daily Mirror is a British national daily tabloid newspaper. Founded in 1903, it is part of Mirror Group Newspapers (MGN), which is owned by parent company Reach plc. From 1985 to 1987, and from 1997 to 2002, the title on its masthead was simply The Mirror. It had an average daily print circulation of 716,923 in December 2016, dropping to 587,803 the following year. Its Sunday sister paper is the Sunday Mirror. Unlike other major British tabloids such as The Sun and the Daily Mail, the Mirror has no separate Scottish edition; this function is performed by the Daily Record and the Sunday Mail, which incorporate certain stories from the Mirror that are of Scottish significance. The Mirror publishes an Irish edition, the Irish Mirror.

Originally pitched to the middle-class reader, it was converted into a working-class newspaper after 1934, in order to reach a larger audience. It was founded by Alfred Harmsworth, who sold it to his brother Harold Harmsworth (from 1914 Lord Rothermere) in 1913. In 1963 a restructuring of the media interests of the Harmsworth family led to the Mirror becoming a part of International Publishing Corporation. During the mid-1960s, daily sales exceeded 5 million copies, a feat never repeated by it or any other daily (non-Sunday) British newspaper since. The Mirror was owned by Robert Maxwell between 1984 and 1991. The paper went through a protracted period of crisis after his death before merging with the regional newspaper group Trinity in 1999 to form Trinity Mirror (now known as Reach plc). In August 2023 Reach launched a US division of the Daily Mirror, titled The Mirror US.

== History ==
=== 1903–1995 ===
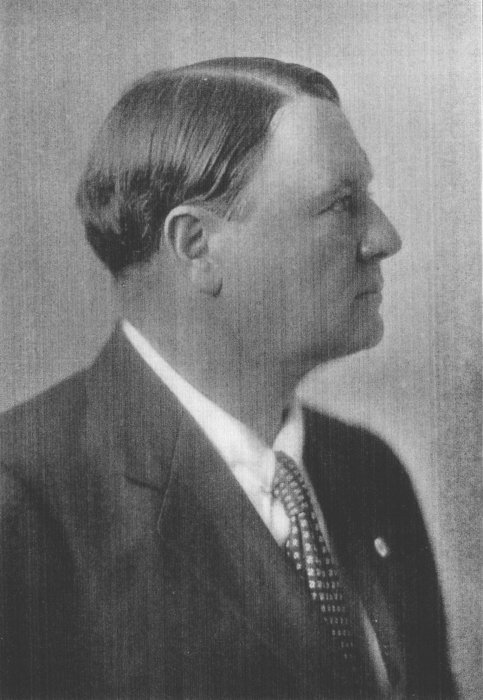
Alfred Harmsworth (later Lord Northcliffe), founder of the Daily Mirror

The Daily Mirror was launched on 2 November 1903 by Alfred Harmsworth (later Lord Northcliffe) as a newspaper for women, run by women. About the name, he said: "I intend it to be really a mirror of feminine life as well on its grave as on its lighter sides ... to be entertaining without being frivolous, and serious without being dull." It cost one penny (equivalent to 44p in 2025).

It was not an immediate success and in 1904 Harmsworth decided to turn it into a pictorial newspaper with a broader focus. Harmsworth appointed Hamilton Fyfe as editor and all of the paper's female journalists were fired. The masthead was changed to The Daily Illustrated Mirror, which ran from 26 January to 27 April 1904 (issues 72 to 150), when it reverted to The Daily Mirror. The first issue of the relaunched paper did not have advertisements on the front page as previously, but instead news text and engraved pictures (of a traitor and an actress), with the promise of photographs inside. Two days later, the price was dropped to one halfpenny and to the masthead was added: "A paper for men and women". This combination was more successful: by issue 92, the guaranteed circulation was 120,000 copies and by issue 269, it had grown to 200,000: by then the name had reverted and the front page was mainly photographs. Circulation grew to 466,000 making it the second-largest morning newspaper.

Alfred Harmsworth sold the newspaper to his brother Harold Harmsworth (from 1914 Lord Rothermere) in 1913. In 1917, the price was increased to one penny. Circulation continued to grow: in 1919, some issues sold more than a million copies a day, making it the largest daily picture paper. In 1924 the newspaper sponsored the 1924 Women's Olympiad held at Stamford Bridge in London.

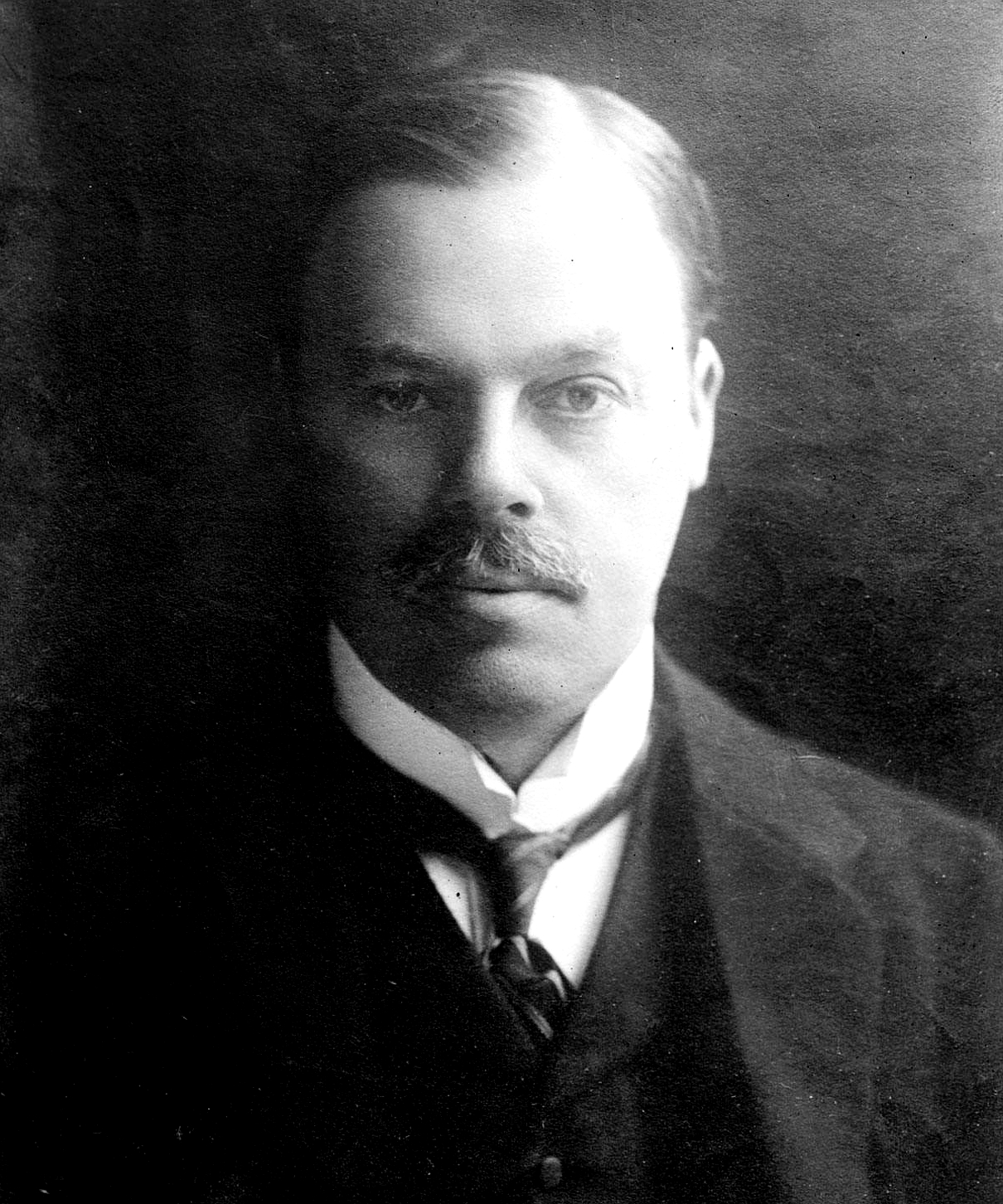
Harold Harmsworth, 1st Viscount Rothermere

Lord Rothermere was a friend of Benito Mussolini and Adolf Hitler, and directed the Mirror's editorial stance towards them in the early 1930s. On Monday, 22 January 1934 the Daily Mirror ran the headline "Give the Blackshirts a helping hand" urging readers to join Sir Oswald Mosley's British Union of Fascists, and giving the address to which to send membership applications. By the mid-1930s, the Mirror was struggling – it and the Mail were the main casualties of the early 1930s circulation war that saw the Daily Herald and the Daily Express establish circulations of more than two million, and Rothermere decided to sell his shares in it.

In 1935 Rothermere sold the paper to Harry Guy Bartholomew and Hugh Cudlipp. With Cecil King (Rothermere's nephew) in charge of the paper's finances and Guy Bartholomew as editor, during the late 1930s the Mirror was transformed from a conservative, middle class newspaper into a left-wing paper for the working class. Partly on the advice of the American advertising agency J. Walter Thompson, the Mirror became the first British paper to adopt the appearance of the New York tabloids. The headlines became bigger, the stories shorter and the illustrations more abundant. By 1939, the publication was selling 1.4 million copies a day. In 1937, Hugh McClelland introduced his wild Western comic strip Beelzebub Jones in the Daily Mirror. After taking over as cartoon chief at the Mirror in 1945, he dropped Beelzebub Jones and moved on to a variety of new strips.

During the Second World War the Mirror positioned itself as the paper of the ordinary soldier and civilian, and was critical of the political leadership and the established parties. At one stage, the paper was threatened with closure following the publication of a Philip Zec cartoon (captioned by William Connor), which was misinterpreted by Winston Churchill and Herbert Morrison. In the 1945 UK general election, the paper strongly supported the Labour Party in its eventual landslide victory. In doing so, the paper supported Herbert Morrison, who co-ordinated Labour's campaign, and recruited his former antagonist Philip Zec to reproduce, on the front page, a popular VE Day cartoon on the morning of the election, suggesting that Labour were the only party who could maintain peace in post-war Britain. By the late 1940s, it was selling 4.5 million copies a day, outstripping the Express; for some 30 years afterwards, it dominated the British daily newspaper market, selling more than 5 million copies a day at its peak in the mid-1960s.

The Mirror was an influential model for German tabloid Bild, which was founded in 1952 and became Europe's best-selling newspaper.

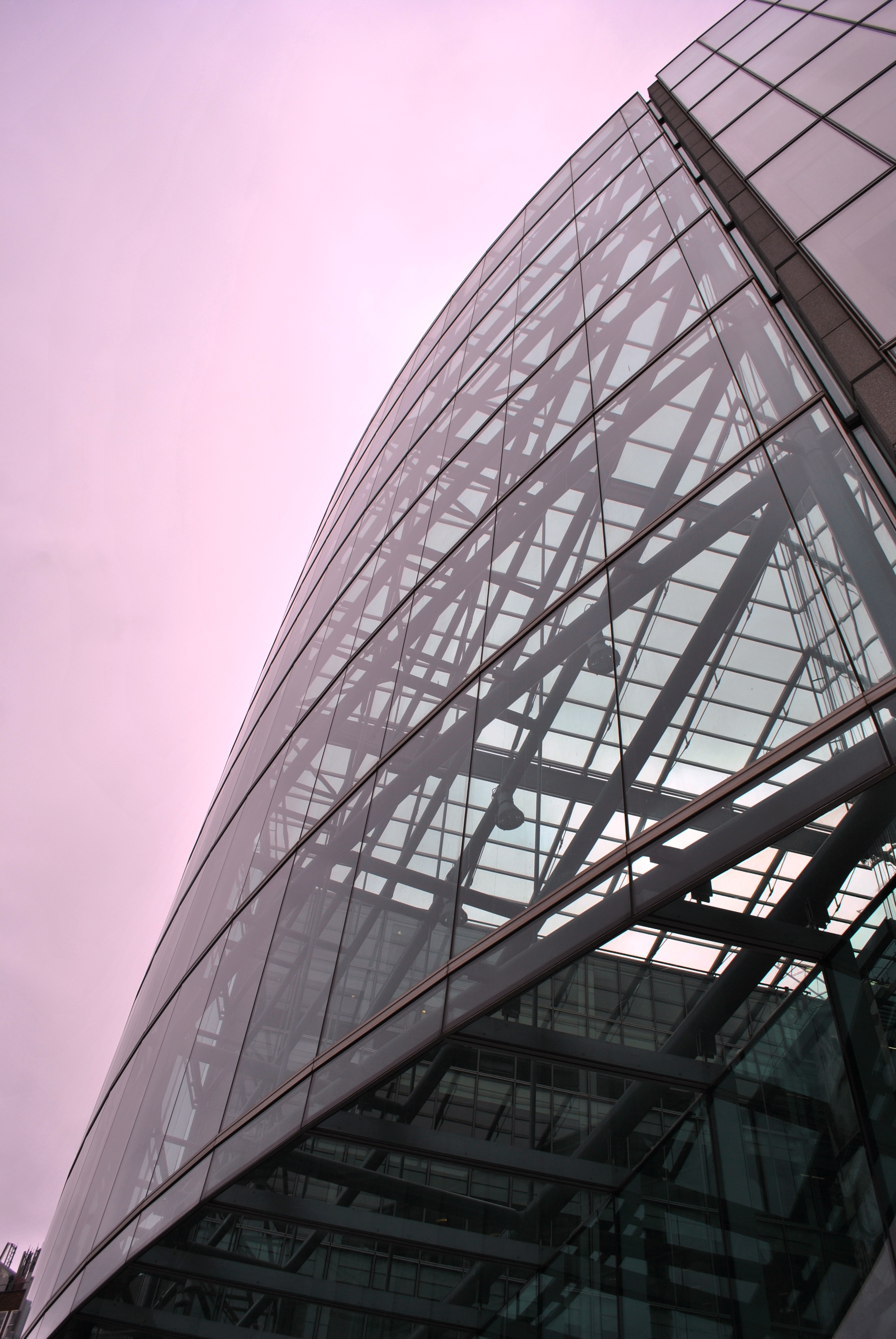
Sainsbury's Building in Holborn, London (former site of Daily Mirror Building)

In 1955, the Mirror and its stablemate the Sunday Pictorial (later to become the Sunday Mirror) began printing a northern edition in Manchester. In 1957 it introduced the Andy Capp cartoon, created by Reg Smythe from Hartlepool, in the northern editions.

The Mirror's mass working-class readership had made it the United Kingdom's best-selling daily tabloid newspaper. In 1960, it acquired the Daily Herald (the popular daily of the labour movement) when it bought Odhams, in one of a series of takeovers which created the International Publishing Corporation (IPC). The Mirror management did not want the Herald competing with the Mirror for readers, and in 1964, relaunched it as a mid-market paper, now named The Sun. When it failed to win readers, The Sun was sold to Rupert Murdoch – who immediately relaunched it as a more populist and sensationalist tabloid and a direct competitor to the Mirror.

In an attempt to cater to a different kind of reader, the Mirror launched the "Mirrorscope" pull-out section on 30 January 1968. The Press Gazette commented: "The Daily Mirror launched its revolutionary four-page supplement "Mirrorscope". The ambitious brief for the supplement, which ran on Wednesdays and Fridays, was to deal with international affairs, politics, industry, science, the arts and business". The British Journalism Review said in 2002 that "Mirrorscope" was "a game attempt to provide serious analysis in the rough and tumble of the tabloids". It failed to attract significant numbers of new readers, and the pull-out section was abandoned, its final issue appearing on 27 August 1974.

In 1978, The Sun overtook the Mirror in circulation, and in 1984 the Mirror was sold to Robert Maxwell. The first Mirror using colour appeared on 1 August 1988 edition. Following Maxwell's death in 1991, David Montgomery became Mirror Group's CEO, and a period of cost-cutting and production changes ensued. The Mirror went through a protracted period of crisis before merging with the regional newspaper group Trinity to form Trinity Mirror in 1999. Printing of the Daily and Sunday Mirror moved to Trinity Mirror's facilities in Watford and Oldham.

=== 1995–2004 ===
Front page of the Mirror 24 June 1996, with headline "ACHTUNG! SURRENDER For you Fritz, ze Euro 96 Championship is over", and accompanying contribution from the editor, "Mirror declares football war on Germany"

Under the editorship of Piers Morgan (from October 1995 to May 2004) the paper saw a number of controversies. Morgan was widely criticised and forced to apologise for the headline "ACHTUNG! SURRENDER For you Fritz, ze Euro 96 Championship is over" a day before England met Germany in a semi-final of the Euro 96 football championships.

In 2000, Morgan was the subject of an investigation after Suzy Jagger wrote a story in The Daily Telegraph revealing that he had bought £20,000 worth of shares in the computer company Viglen soon before the Mirror's 'City Slickers' column tipped Viglen as a good buy. Morgan was found by the Press Complaints Commission to have breached the Code of Conduct on financial journalism, but kept his job. The 'City Slickers' columnists, Anil Bhoyrul and James Hipwell, were both found to have committed further breaches of the Code, and were dismissed before the inquiry. In 2004, further enquiry by the Department of Trade and Industry cleared Morgan from any charges. On 7 December 2005 Bhoyrul and Hipwell were convicted of conspiracy to breach the Financial Services Act. During the trial it emerged that Morgan had bought £67,000 worth of Viglen shares, emptying his bank account and investing under his wife's name too.

In 2002, the Mirror attempted to move mid-market, claiming to eschew the more trivial stories of show-business and gossip. The paper changed its masthead logo from red to black (and occasionally blue), in an attempt to dissociate itself from the term "red top", a term for a sensationalist mass-market tabloid. (On 6 April 2005, the red top came back.) Under then-editor Piers Morgan, the newspaper's editorial stance opposed the 2003 invasion of Iraq, and ran many front pages critical of the war. It also gave financial support to the 15 February 2003 anti-war protest, paying for a large screen and providing thousands of placards. Morgan re-hired John Pilger, who had been dismissed during Robert Maxwell's ownership of the Mirror titles. Despite such changes, Morgan was unable to halt the paper's decline in circulation, a decline shared by its direct tabloid rivals The Sun and the Daily Star.

Morgan was dismissed from the Mirror on 14 May 2004 after authorising the newspaper's publication of photographs allegedly showing Iraqi prisoners being abused by British Army soldiers from the Queen's Lancashire Regiment. Within days the photographs were shown to be fakes. Under the headline "SORRY.. WE WERE HOAXED", the Mirror responded that it had fallen victim to a "calculated and malicious hoax" and apologised for the publication of the photographs.

=== 2004–present ===
The Mirror's front page on 4 November 2004, after the re-election of George W. Bush as US president, read "How can 59,054,087 people be so DUMB?". It provided a list of states and their alleged average IQ, showing the Bush states all below average intelligence (except for Virginia), and all John Kerry states at or above average intelligence. The source for this table was The Economist, although it was a hoax. Richard Wallace became editor in 2004.

On 30 May 2012, Trinity Mirror announced the merger of the Daily Mirror and Sunday Mirror into a single seven-day-a-week title. Richard Wallace and Tina Weaver, the respective editors of the Daily Mirror and Sunday Mirror, were simultaneously dismissed and Lloyd Embley, editor of The People, appointed as editor of the combined title with immediate effect. In 2018, Reach plc acquired the Northern & Shell titles, including the Daily Express, which led to a number of editor moves across the stable. Lloyd Embley was then promoted to editor-in-chief across the entire group, and Alison Phillips (previously deputy editor-in-chief for the Trinity Mirror titles) was appointed editor of the Daily Mirror.

In August 2023 MGN Ltd and Reach plc launched a division of the Daily Mirror for the United States. It consists of a news website, titled The Mirror US, with offices based in New York City.

== Political allegiance ==
The Mirror has consistently supported the Labour Party since the 1945 UK general election. On the day of the 1979 UK general election, the Daily Mirror urged its readers to vote for the governing Labour Party led by James Callaghan. As widely predicted by the opinion polls, Labour lost this election and Conservative Margaret Thatcher became prime minister. The Mirror's continued support of the Labour government was in spite of its falling popularity over the previous few months which had been partly as a result of what was labelled by the Daily Mail the "Winter of Discontent", where the country was crippled by numerous public sector strikes.

By the time of the 1983 UK general election, Labour support was at a postwar low, partly due to the strong challenge by the recently formed SDP–Liberal Alliance. Despite this, the Daily Mirror remained loyal to Labour and urged its readers to vote for the party, then led by Michael Foot, condemning the Thatcher-led Tory government for its "waste of our nation", as well as the rise in unemployment that Thatcher's Conservative government had seen in its first term in power largely due to monetarist economic policies to reduce inflation, although the government's previously low popularity had dramatically improved since the success of the Falklands conflict a year earlier. However, the Conservatives were re-elected and Labour suffered its worst postwar general election result, only narrowly bettering the SDP–Liberal Alliance in terms of votes whilst winning considerably more seats.

At the 1987 UK general election, the Daily Mirror remained loyal to Labour, led by Neil Kinnock, and urged its readers with the slogan "You know he's right, chuck her out." By this stage, unemployment was falling and inflation had remained low for several years. As a result, the Tories were re-elected for a third successive term, although Labour did cut the Tory majority slightly. For the 1992 UK general election, the Daily Mirror continued to support Labour, still led by Neil Kinnock. By this stage, Thatcher had stepped down and the Tory government was now led by John Major. The election was won by the Conservatives, although Labour managed to significantly cut the Tory majority to 21 seats compared to the triple-digit figure of the previous two elections, which led to a difficult term for Major. The outcome of this election had been far less predictable than any of the previous three elections, as opinion polls over the previous three years had shown both parties in the lead, although any Labour lead in the polls had been relatively narrow since the Conservative government's change of leader from Thatcher to Major in November 1990, in spite of the onset of the early 1990s recession which had pushed unemployment up again after several years of decline. Labour's credibility was helped by plans including extra National Health Service (NHS) funding and moving away from firm commitments on re-nationalisation to reverse the Conservative policy of privatisation, but its decision to be up-front about tax increases was seen as a key factor in its failure to win.

By the time of the 1997 UK general election, support for the Labour Party, by then led by Tony Blair, in the opinion polls had exceeded that of support for the Conservative government led by John Major since late 1992, whose reduced popularity largely blamed on the failings of Black Wednesday in September of that year and it had failed to recover popularity in spite of a strong economic recovery and fall in unemployment. A reinvented New Labour had further improved its credibility under Blair by promising traditional Labour essentials including more funding for healthcare and education but also promising not to increase income tax and ending its commitment to the nationalisation of leading industries. The Daily Mirror urged its readers that their country needed Blair, and to vote Labour.

The 1997 election produced a Labour landslide that ended the party's 18-year exile from power, followed by two further wins in the 2001 and 2005 UK general elections. On 4 May 2010, the newspaper printed a picture of Conservative leader David Cameron with a giant red cross through his face. The headline read "How to stop him" in reference to the 2010 UK general election two days later, confirming the Daily Mirror's Labour allegiance. The election ended in Britain's first hung parliament since 1974 but Cameron still became prime minister within days as the Conservatives formed a coalition with the Liberal Democrats. The Daily Mirror was the only leading national newspaper to remain loyal to Labour and Gordon Brown at a time when opinion polls showed the party on course for their worst election result since 1983.

The newspaper was critical of the Liberal Democrats for forming the coalition which enabled the Conservatives to form a new government in 2010, and branded leader Nick Clegg as Pinickio (alluding to the lying fictional character Pinocchio) for going back on numerous pre-election pledges. It has frequently referred to the party as the "Fib Dems" or "Lib Dumbs". The Daily Mirror endorsed Democratic candidate Hillary Clinton in the run-up for the 2016 US presidential election. Also in 2016, the newspaper asked for Jeremy Corbyn's resignation "for the good of the party and of the country." Despite this critical position, the Daily Mirror endorsed the Labour Party in the 2017 UK general election. For the 2019 UK general election, the newspaper again endorsed Labour "to protect NHS, end poverty and for a kinder Britain." The Daily Mirror threw its support behind the Labour Party for the 2024 UK general election, stating that "a Labour government is more crucial than ever for the new generation."

== Famous features ==
- Cartoon strips Pip, Squeak and Wilfred (1919–56), Jane (1932–59), Garth (1943–97, reprints 2011), Just Jake (1938–52), Andy Capp (1957–), and The Perishers (1955–2006 and later reprints).
- "The Old Codgers", a fictional pair who commented on the letters page from 1935 to 1990.
- Chalky White, who would wander around various British seaside resorts waiting to be recognised by Mirror readers (an obscured photo of him having been published in that day's paper). Anyone who recognised him would have to repeat some phrase along the lines of "To my delight, it's Chalky White" to win £5. The name continues to be used on the cartoons page, as Andy Capp's best friend.
- "Shock issues" intended to highlight a particular news story.
- The columnist Cassandra (1935–67).
- "Dear Marje", a problem page by agony aunt Marjorie Proops.
- Investigative reporting by Paul Foot and John Pilger (including the latter's exposé of the atrocities of the Khmer Rouge in Cambodia).
- "The Shopping Basket". Starting in the mid-1970s, the paper monitored the cost of a £5 basket of shopping to see how it increased in price over the years.

=== Blue issue ===
On 2 April 1996, the Daily Mirror was printed entirely on blue paper. This was done as a marketing exercise with Pepsi-Cola, who on the same day had decided to relaunch its cans with a blue design instead of the traditional red and white logo.

== Libel, contempt of court, errors and criticism ==
- In the 1959 Liberace v Daily Mirror case, Liberace sued the Mirror for libel. On 26 September 1956, William Connor had written a pseudonymous column hinting that the American entertainer was a homosexual; at the time, homosexual acts were illegal in Britain. The jury found in Liberace's favour and he received £8,000 in damages (estimated at £500,000 in 2009). After Liberace's death, the paper editorially asked, "Can we have our money back, please?"
- In 1991, shortly after the death of Queen's lead singer Freddie Mercury, the Daily Mirror ran a column by Joe Haines which contained extensive insults towards Mercury, HIV/AIDS victims, and homosexuals. The article prompted an open letter in condemnation from folk singer Lal Waterson, later recorded as a song by her sister Norma.
- In December 1992, Scottish politician George Galloway won libel damages from the Daily Mirror and its Scottish sister the Daily Record, who had falsely accused him of making malicious allegations about their foreign editor Nicholas Davies. Galloway had used parliamentary privilege to call for an independent investigation into allegations about Davies made in the book The Samson Option.
- In May 2004, the Daily Mirror published what it claimed were photos of British soldiers abusing Iraqi prisoners at an unspecified location in Iraq. The decision to publish the photos, subsequently shown to be hoaxes, led to Piers Morgan's sacking as editor of the paper on 14 May 2004. The Daily Mirror then stated that it was the subject of a "calculated and malicious hoax". The newspaper issued a statement apologising for the printing of the pictures. The paper's deputy editor, Des Kelly, took over as acting editor during the crisis. The tabloid's rival, The Sun, offered a £50,000 reward for the arrest and conviction of those accused of faking the Mirror photographs.
- In June 2004, American model Caprice Bourret won a libel case against the Daily Mirror for an article in April that year which falsely claimed that her acting career had failed.
- In November 2007, the Daily Mirror paid damages to Sir Andrew Green after having likened him and his group MigrationWatch UK to the Ku Klux Klan and Nazi Party in September of that year. The newspaper admitted that such allegations were "untrue".
- In February 2008 both the Daily and the Sunday Mirror implied that TV presenter Kate Garraway was having an affair. She sued for libel, receiving an apology and compensation payment in April 2008.
- On 18 September 2008, David Anderson, a British sports journalist writing for the Mirror, repeated a claim deriving from vandalism on Wikipedia's entry for Cypriot football team AC Omonia, which asserted that their fans were called "The Zany Ones" and liked to wear hats made from discarded shoes. The claim was part of Anderson's match preview ahead of AC Omonia's game with Manchester City, which appeared in the web and print versions of the Mirror, with the nickname also quoted in subsequent editions on 19 September.
- In November 2009, the Mirror paid "substantial" damages for libel to Portuguese footballer Cristiano Ronaldo after it admitted that a story about him becoming highly intoxicated in a Hollywood nightclub was untrue.
- On 12 May 2011, the High Court of England and Wales granted the Attorney General permission to bring a case for contempt against The Sun and the Daily Mirror for the way they had reported on the arrest of a person of interest in the Murder of Joanna Yeates. On 29 July, the Court ruled that both newspapers had been in contempt of court, fining the Daily Mirror £50,000 and The Sun £18,000.
- In October 2013, a defamation case brought by the Irish airline Ryanair against the Daily Mirror was settled out of court. The Mirror had repeated allegations about the airline's safety from a Channel 4 documentary which were not reflected by its most recent evaluation by the Irish Aviation Authority.
- On 19 July 2011 the Mirror published an article labelling comedian Frankie Boyle a racist. He later sued for defamation and libel, winning £54,650 in damages and a further £4,250 for a claim about his departure from Mock the Week. The Mirror had argued he was "forced to quit" but this was found to be libellous by the court.
- On 20 March 2017 the Mirror painted the traditional Russian pancake celebration Maslenitsa as a Hooligan training ground. One of the centuries-old tradition in this Russian festival is "wall-to-wall" ('stenka na stenku', Ru) which is sparring between men dressed in traditional folk clothes. This tradition was wrongly represented by the Mirror in the pictures and text, labelled as violent acts and living in fear without giving context or any information about this Russian traditional festival at all. The Mirror article was titled "Russia's Ultra yobs infiltrated amid warnings England fans could be KILLED at World Cup", and received negative receptions from Russian media, also being described as fake news. Representatives of the Daily Mirror acknowledged that the original material of the publication about Russian Hooligans was incorrectly illustrated with images of the traditional festival. In the updated version of the article the newspaper continued to insist that the photographed people were hooligans in the pictures, but gave no evidence of their participation in the festival.
- In March 2019, the Daily Mirror faced criticism from social media users, as well as from columnist Owen Jones and journalist Mehdi Hasan, for covering the Christchurch mosque shootings with the headline "Angelic boy who grew into an evil far-right mass killer" in reference to perpetrator Brenton Tarrant. Users criticised it for humanising Tarrant while ignoring the victims, and for the perceived double standard of how attacks conducted by Islamists are portrayed more negatively than those by white supremacists. These criticisms typically contrasted the Daily Mirror's coverage of Tarrant with its coverage of Orlando nightclub shooting perpetrator Omar Mateen three years earlier, who was covered with the headline "ISIS Maniac Kills 50 in Gay Nightclub".

== Significant staff members ==
=== Editors ===
- 1903–1904: Mary Howarth
- 1904–1907: Hamilton Fyfe
- 1907–1915: Alexander Kenealy
- 1915–1916: Ed Flynn
- 1916–1929: Alexander Campbell
- 1929–1931: Cameron Hogg
- 1931–1934: Leigh Brownlee
- 1934–1948: Cecil Thomas
- 1948–1953: Silvester Bolam
- 1953–1961: Jack Nener
- 1961–1971: Lee Howard
- 1971–1974: Tony Miles
- 1974–1975: Michael Christiansen
- 1975–1985: Mike Molloy
- 1985–1990: Richard Stott
- 1990–1991: Roy Greenslade
- 1991–1992: Richard Stott
- 1992–1994: David Banks
- 1994–1995: Colin Myler
- 1995–2004: Piers Morgan
- 2004–2012: Richard Wallace
- 2012–2018: Peter Willis
- 2018–2024: Alison Phillips
- 2024–2025: Caroline Waterston
- 2025: Chloe Hubbard

Source: Tabloid Nation

=== Notable columnists ===
Notable former and current columnists of the Daily Mirror include:

- The 3AM Girls (gossip columnists)
- Anne Robinson (columnist and deputy editor)
- William Connor (opinion under the pseudonym Cassandra (1935–1967))
- Caradoc Evans (1917–1923)
- Richard Hammond (motoring and Saturday columnist)
- Oliver Holt (sports columnist)
- Kevin Maguire (UK politics)
- Fiona Phillips (Saturday columnist)
- Brian Reade (Thursday columnist; also does a sports column on Saturdays)
- Keith Waterhouse (largely humorous (1970–1986, previously a reporter.)
- Chris Hughes (security and defence)
- Geoffrey Goodman (1969–1986)

== Awards ==
The Daily Mirror won "Newspaper of the Year" in 2002 at the British Press Awards. It won "Scoop of the Year" in 2003 ("3am", 'Sven and Ulrika'), 2004 (Ryan Parry, 'Intruder at the Palace'), 2006 and 2007 (both Stephen Moyes). The Mirror won "Team of the Year" in 2001 ('Railtrack'), 2002 ('War on the World: World against Terrorism'), 2003 ('Soham'), and 2006 ('London bombings'); and "Front Page of the Year" in 2007. The Mirror also won the "Cudlipp Award" in 2002, 2003, 2004 and 2010.

== See also ==
- The Wharf — sister newspaper for the Isle of Dogs
- Daily Mirror Silver Cup
