= Chris Hughes (journalist) =

British tabloid journalist and author

- Born: London, England
- Occupations: Author, war correspondent
- Known for: first Western reporter to Iraq, first Western journalist to access Saddam Hussein's bunker
- Notable credit: Daily Mirror
- Awards: 2013 Specialist Journalist of the Year.
- Website: www.mirror.co.uk

Chris Hughes is a British tabloid journalist and author best known for his reporting of the Iraq War and war in Afghanistan. In 2013 he received Specialist Journalist of the Year Award in recognition for his work as a defense correspondent

== Career ==
Since 1994 Hughes has been working as security correspondent for the Daily Mirror, specialising in conflict-zone reporting with particular emphasis on Middle Eastern conflicts, global terrorism and war, and has spent time covering the wars in Iraq and Afghanistan. His memoir, Road Trip to Hell (2011), details his time with UK and American forces in the two countries.

=== War reporting ===
In 2001 Hughes started reporting from Iraq and in 2006 he covered Israel–Lebanon war from Beirut. In 2016 Hughes started reporting about a military coup in Turkey. In 2017 he was reporting from the frontline in the battle to liberate Mosul from the Islamic State, from the beginning of the campaign and from within Mosul as ISIL were defeated. In September 2017 his exclusive story about North Korean leader Kim Jong-un appeared on the front-page of the Daily Mirror newspaper.

== Publications ==
In his memoir Road Trip to Hell, Hughes mentioned he was the first Western reporter to enter Iraq after the September 11, 2001 attacks on the United States, and the first Western journalist to access Saddam Hussein's bunker. He also claims to have witnessed unarmed demonstrators killed and wounded in Fallujah by US Marines. In 2009 Hughes co-authored Attack State Red, an account of the 2007 campaign undertaken by the Royal Anglian Regiment, documenting their initial deployment and trials in Afghanistan.

== Awards ==
In 2013 Hughes was awarded Specialist Journalist of the Year Award in recognition for his work as a specialist war correspondent.

== See also ==
- Investigative journalism
- War reporting
