= Tony Miles (journalist) =

British newspaper editor (1930–2018)

Anthony John Miles (18 July 1930 – 14 April 2018), better known as Tony Miles, was a British newspaper editor.

Miles grew up in High Wycombe. After attending the Royal Grammar School, High Wycombe from 1942 to 1946, he worked on the Middlesex Advertiser, Nottingham Guardian and Evening Argus, before joining the Daily Mirror in 1954, as a feature writer. In 1966, he was appointed as an assistant editor, then the following year as associate editor, before becoming overall editor of the newspaper in 1971.

Miles held the editorship for three years, following which he was appointed as Editorial Director of the Mirror Group, for a few years also serving as its chairman. He also sat on the Press Council and served as a director of Reuters. In 1984, he stood down from his remaining British posts, unhappy with Robert Maxwell's control of the Mirror, and moved to the United States, where he became an Executive Publisher with the Globe Communications Corporation, publisher of the National Examiner, until the early 1990s.

Miles died at the age of 87 on 14 April 2018 at Highgate Nursing Home, London.

Media offices
| Preceded by Lee Howard | Editor of the Daily Mirror; 1971–1974 | Succeeded by Michael Christiansen |
