= Wilfred Brownlee =

English cricketer

Personal information
- Born: 18 April 1890; Bristol, England
- Died: 12 October 1914 (aged 24); Wyke Regis, Dorset, England
- Batting: Right-handed

Domestic team information
- Years: Team
- 1909-1914: Gloucestershire
- Source: Cricinfo, 30 March 2014

Wilfred Brownlee (18 April 1890 – 12 October 1914) was an English cricketer. He played for Gloucestershire between 1909 and 1914. While serving as a second lieutenant in the Dorsetshire Regiment, Brownlee died of meningitis before he could serve in the First World War.
