= Guardian Australia =

Australian online newspaper

- Type: Online newspaper
- Owner: Guardian Media Group
- Editor: David Munk
- Deputy editor: Gabrielle Jackson and Patrick Keneally
- Managing editor: Alison Rourke
- News editor: Josephine Tovey
- Opinion editor: Svetlana Stankovic
- Photo editor: Carly Earl
- Founded: 27 May 2013
- Language: English
- Headquarters: Foster Street, Sydney, Australia
- Country: Australia
- Sister newspapers: The Guardian, Guardian US, Guardian New Zealand
- ISSN: 1440-3765
- Website: www.theguardian.com/au

Guardian Australia is the Australian website of the British global online and print newspaper, The Guardian.

Available solely in an online format, the newspaper's launch was led by Katharine Viner in time for the 2013 Australian federal election and followed the introduction of Guardian US in 2011. Guardian Australia is owned by Guardian Media Group, which is in turn owned by the Scott Trust, which aims to stay independent and free from 'commercial pressures'. The online publication relies on digital advertising and voluntary reader donations or subscriptions for revenue, eschewing enforced paywalls implemented by other news websites.

Guardian Australia's headquarters is based in the Sydney suburb of Surry Hills, with bureaux in Brisbane, Melbourne and Canberra. It employs more than 70 journalists, editors and other personnel As of 2020.

== History ==
Prior to its 2013 launch the British edition of the website was already popular with Australian audiences, with over 1.3 million users per month helping it rank just outside the top 10 most-visited news websites in Australia. In June 2018 and July 2021, Guardian Australia was ranked No. 5 among news websites in Australia.

Following an investment from businessman Graeme Wood, prompted by Malcolm Turnbull, Guardian Australia was launched on 27 May 2013 in the lead-up to the 2013 federal election. The British team was joined by local journalists, some of whom previously worked at News Corp Australia and Fairfax Media, including Lenore Taylor, Katherine Murphy and David Marr.

Guardian Australia has a comment is free section edited by Gabrielle Jackson, featuring opinion pieces from regular writers, politicians, other public figures and members of the public.

In 2016, it was announced that the then political editor Lenore Taylor would take over the editorship following the end of Emily Wilson's tenure.

In May 2017, as part of a confidential legal settlement, Guardian Australia issued an apology to Noel Pearson over a story they published in January 2017, which made defamatory claims. The newspaper said that "The Guardian Australia accepts that the comments regarding Mr Noel Pearson in that article were false. The Guardian Australia unreservedly retracts the statements made in the article regarding Mr Noel Pearson and apologises for the harm and distress caused to him."

Guardian Australia turned its first profit after five years of operations with a balance of $700,000 in financial year 2017–2018. Previously, the online publication posted a loss of A$7.5 million against a revenue of A$3.79 million in 2013–2014, a loss of A$6 million in 2014–2015 and a loss of A$14 million in 2015–2016.

To align with a shift in priorities from The Guardian's global operations, from 2023 the Australian edition refused to accept further advertising of gambling services.

In September 2025, Guardian Australia appointed Tom McIlroy as their new political editor.

In December 2025, Guardian Australia was ranked as the fourth most visited news website in Australia.

In February 2026, Taylor resigned as editor. Guardian Australia commenced an open process to appoint a new editor, while David Munk became acting editor. Munk was previously the senior managing editor of the British version of The Guardian. In June, Guardian Australia appointed David Munk as full-time editor.

== Ownership ==
Guardian Australia is owned by Guardian Media Group, which is in turn owned by the Scott Trust, a limited company which aims to ensure the editorial independence of its publications and websites.

== Editorial stance ==
Guardian Australia endorsed the Labor Party and the Greens for the 2019 Australian federal election, for the 2022 and 2025 Australian federal election it endorsed the Labor Party, the Greens and the teal independents.
