= Guardian New Zealand =

Online newspaper

The Guardian New Zealand
- Type: Online newspaper
- Publisher: Guardian Media Group
- Founded: 4 November 2019; 6 years ago
- Language: English
- Sister newspapers: The Guardian, Guardian US, Guardian Australia
- Website: https://www.theguardian.com/world/newzealand

Guardian New Zealand is the New Zealand localisation of The Guardian's international news website. It consists of a mixture of the site's own international content, together with local news provided by a small resident news bureau. It is reached by accessing The Guardian's own site in New Zealand. It has existed since the 4 November 2019, and started as part of the news site's "New Zealand at 5 million" project. Despite its local name, the site is sub-edited outside country by the page’s sister sites Guardian Australia and The Guardian.

== Background ==
In 2019, the website was one of the top ten news sites in New Zealand, and the forty-fifth most visited site in the country. There was also growing interest in news from the country from outside New Zealand, which meant an increasing contact with resident journalists. From that, The Guardian recruited their previous freelance correspondent, Dunedin-based Eleanor Ainge-Roy and placed her under a full time contract, and kept in touch with The New York Times' New Zealand correspondent Charlotte Graham-McLay.

Unlike The Guardian Australia, which started though a one-off grant from businessman Graeme Wood, the bureau has no further external funding and so it is entirely dependent on readers and advertising revenue. As with other Guardian Media Group publications, Guardian New Zealand is ultimately owned by The Scott Trust, which aims to stay independent and free from "commercial pressures". The online publication relies on digital advertising and voluntary reader donations or subscriptions for revenue, eschewing enforced paywalls implemented by other news websites like The New Zealand Herald online.

== Response ==
So far, response has been fairly well received from readers and other news sources. Some have hoped that it would diversify the local media landscape.
