= Crown & Caliber =

- Editor-in-chief: Alexandra Cheney
- Categories: Luxury lifestyle
- Publisher: European Watch Company
- Founded: 2013
- First issue: February 10, 2026; 3 months ago (as a digital magazine)
- Country: United States
- Language: English
- Website: crownandcaliber.com

Crown & Caliber is an American English-language online lifestyle magazine.

== History ==
Crown & Caliber was founded in 2013 in Atlanta by Hamilton Powell as a marketplace for pre-owned luxury watches.

In 2015, Crown & Caliber formed a joint initiative with Neiman Marcus. By 2020, it had secured a US$17 million senior secured credit facility to support growth and working capital.

In February 2021, Hodinkee acquired it for US$46 million. By May 2021, Crown & Caliber began sharing content across its own channels and Hodinkee's platforms.

Following the post-pandemic market downturn, Hodinkee divested the brand in October 2024, selling its digital assets to Boston-based European Watch Company.

On February 10, 2026, Crown & Caliber relaunched as an online lifestyle magazine. As of 2026, Alexandra Cheney serves as editor-in-chief, while European Watch Company serves as publisher of the magazine.

== Magazine ==
As part of the 2026 relaunch as an online lifestyle magazine, Crown & Caliber expanded beyond horology to cover travel, style, and broader lifestyle topics. It produces digital and video content distributed through its website and social media.

As of 2026, its website organizes its coverage into sections including Watches, Machines, Travel, Food & Drink, Style, and Ampersand.
