= Richard Farquhar Scott =

Richard Farquhar Scott (16 May 1914 – 11 November 2011) was an English journalist, great-grandson of the founder of The Manchester Guardian newspaper (later simplified by him to The Guardian), and Chairman of the Scott Trust, its owner.

== Early life ==
By the time of Richard's birth, his grandfather Charles Prestwich Scott had already been editor of The Manchester Guardian for 43 years. In 1929, C. P. Scott handed over the editorship to his son, Richard's father, Edward. Just three years later, and only months after inheriting half of the newspaper on Charles's death, tragedy struck when Edward was drowned while boating with Richard on Windermere. Richard had been educated at Gresham's School, and, with the financial support of Edward's brother John Russell Scott, he was able to join Christ's College, Cambridge, where he matriculated later that same year, 1932. Edward's shares in the newspaper had gone to John who, in 1936 arranged for them to be transferred into a trust, to avoid inheritance taxes. Hence, Richard was never more than momentarily an owner of the paper.

== Journalism ==
Richard Scott commenced his work as a journalist at the League of Nations Union, where he wrote brochures, pamphlets and memoranda for members, then for a year worked at The Spectator, followed by the British Council. He joined the Foreign Office during the Second World War. In 1947, he joined the Guardian as diplomatic correspondent.

== Saving The Guardian ==
While writing critically of the Eden government in the context of the Suez crisis in 1956, Richard Scott was appointed chairman of the Scott Trust. He managed to hold this position without attending a single meeting of its board for ten years, although, concentrating on his reporting work for The Guardian, including moving to Georgetown, Washington, D.C., in 1963 to work under Alistair Cooke. Richard famously for the first time used his position as chairman of the trust to oppose his cousin Laurence Scott's plan to merge The Guardian, of which he, Laurence, was then chairman, with the Times in 1966, for which resistance Richard was considered the saviour of its independence.

== Later years and death ==
Scott remained in Washington until 1971, when he moved to Paris for a three-year assignment. He retired from journalism in 1974, taking up residence at his vineyard in Limoux. After divorce from his second wife, Anna Walmsley, he moved into a small cottage in the nearby town of Lagrasse, Corbières, where he passed his remaining years with a third wife, Christiane.
