= Alastair Hetherington =

British journalist, newspaper editor and academic (1919–1999)

- Born: Hector Alastair Hetherington; 31 October 1919; Glamorgan, Wales
- Died: 3 October 1999 (aged 79); Bannockburn, Stirling, Scotland
- Education: Corpus Christi College, Oxford
- Occupations: Journalist and editor
- Spouse(s): Miranda Oliver (m. 1957; div. 1978) Sheila Janet Cameron (m. 1979)
- Children: 4
- Father: Sir Hector Hetherington

Hector Alastair Hetherington (31 October 1919 – 3 October 1999) was a British journalist, newspaper editor and academic. For nearly twenty years he was the editor of The Guardian, and he is regarded as one of the leading editors of the second half of the twentieth century.

== Early life and career ==
Hetherington was the son of Sir Hector Hetherington, professor of logic and philosophy at University College, Cardiff, and later Principal of the University of Glasgow. His mother was Mary Ethel Alison Reid (1886–1966). He was educated at Gresham's School in Holt, Norfolk, from 1933 to 1937 and then at Corpus Christi College, Oxford, from 1938 to 1940, but his time at Oxford was interrupted by the Second World War. Though his myopia initially kept him from duty in a combat regiment, eventually he joined the Royal Armoured Corps and subsequently transferred to the Northamptonshire Yeomanry. Shortly after the Normandy landings he was a tank captain advancing towards Vire when his tank was destroyed. He later took part in the relief of Antwerp and ended his army career as a major in the Intelligence Corps, during which time he wrote a Military Geography of Schleswig-Holstein.

Based on three months as a trainee sub-editor for the Glasgow Herald, Hetherington was offered a posting after his demobilisation as managing editor of Die Welt, the first German national newspaper to be produced in the British zone after the war. The experience confirmed his decision to pursue a career in journalism rather than academia, and he rejoined the Glasgow Herald a year later as a sub-editor and writer of articles on defence matters.

== Editor of The Manchester Guardian ==
In 1950, Hetherington moved to The Manchester Guardian. There, he caught the eye of the paper's editor, A. P. Wadsworth, who helped him win a Commonwealth Fund Fellowship and named him as foreign editor in 1953. When Wadsworth fell terminally ill three years later, the chairman of the paper, Laurence Scott, named Hetherington as Wadsworth's successor. Though there were three more senior journalists on staff, Scott wanted to transform the Guardian into a national newspaper, and wanted a younger man capable of overseeing the effort.

Within weeks of taking over as editor, Hetherington faced the question of how to respond to the Suez Crisis. His denunciation of Britain's involvement as an "act of folly, without justification in any terms but brief expediency" precipitated enormous criticism from thousands of readers, but an increase in circulation and Britain's subsequent withdrawal vindicated the young editor. Suez soon proved to be only the first of many causes Hetherington took up, as he used as his position to campaign for social justice, alleviating the poverty gap between northern and southern England, and nuclear disarmament. He was present at the founding of the Campaign for Nuclear Disarmament (CND), attending preliminary meetings at the house of Lord Simon of Wythenshawe, with Bertrand Russell and Sir Bernard Lovell, but he did not join or support the organisation. He also gave evidence for the defence at the Lady Chatterley trial and became the first British editor to allow the word "fuck" to be used in his newspaper.

=== Becoming a national newspaper ===
During this time Hetherington also was busy overseeing the evolution of the Guardian into a national newspaper. After dropping the word "Manchester" from the masthead in 1959, the paper opened a London headquarters two years later. The transition proved difficult, however, as sales dropped and advertising revenue failed to fill the gap. Hetherington himself was commuting by train between London and Manchester twice or three times weekly. Twice Scott sought to solve the problem by selling the paper to The Times, but was rebuffed the first time and stopped by Hetherington's unyielding opposition to the second proposal. Ultimately, thanks to the profits from The Guardian's sister publication, the Manchester Evening News, the paper weathered the move.

As The Guardian's immediate prospects slowly improved, Hetherington focused on the task on turning the paper into one capable of competing on a national level. He pushed for expanded features, including special supplements and the first op-ed page in a British daily. Such was his success by this point that Hetherington won Journalist of the Year at the National Press Awards in 1971. Politically the paper benefited from careful cultivation by Harold Wilson, though Hetherington's closest political friend was Jo Grimond. For more than twenty years Hetherington wrote leading articles that sought to promote Liberal–Labour co-operation to defeat the Conservative Party. Though initially against America's involvement in Vietnam, after meeting with American military commanders on a trip to Saigon he changed the paper's stance opposing the conflict, a move that generated much internal staff dissent.

=== Departure ===
By the early 1970s The Guardian enjoyed a healthy circulation approaching 350,000; nevertheless, the paper continued to face financial challenges that exhausted Hetherington. As he approached the end of his second decade as editor, he considered the possibility of moving on to a less demanding field such as academia. In 1975, however, he accepted an offer from his friend Michael Swann, the chairman of the BBC, to assume the vacant position of Controller of BBC Scotland.

== Later career ==
Hetherington's time as Controller of BBC Scotland was not a happy one. He did much to invigorate programme output, and appointed a number of specialist news correspondents, including Helen Liddell and Chris Baur, to try to increase Scotland's presence on the BBC networks. He also sought increased financial freedom from the BBC in London. Encountering a more bureaucratic organisation than the one he knew at The Guardian, he clashed with the director general of the BBC, Charles Curran. In 1978 he was sacked from the position by Curran's successor, Ian Trethowan, and named as Manager of BBC Radio Highland. In 1982 he became research professor in media studies at Stirling University, and in 1984 he succeeded Richard Scott as chairman of the Scott Trust. He brought a new style to that office as a hands-on and interventionist chairman, giving critical support to his successor as editor, Peter Preston. He also played a substantial part in the appointment of his successor as chairman, Hugo Young. In 1989 Hetherington retired to the Isle of Arran, where he wrote and worked on projects before he was forced to give up such activities due to the onset of Alzheimer's disease in the mid-1990s.

== Personal life ==
Hetherington was married twice. His first marriage was in 1957 to Miranda Oliver, a librarian who worked in the cuttings library at the Manchester Guardian. Together they had four children. After their divorce in 1978, Hetherington met Sheila Janet Cameron, a political consultant, in 1979 and married her later that year.

== Death and memorials ==
Hetherington died on 3 October 1999 and is buried next to his parents in the cemetery in Tillicoultry, just south-east of the war memorial.

The Institute of Contemporary Scotland's Academy of Merit makes an annual Alastair Hetherington Award for Humanitarian Service. In 1999, Stirling University instituted an annual Hetherington Memorial Lecture in his memory.

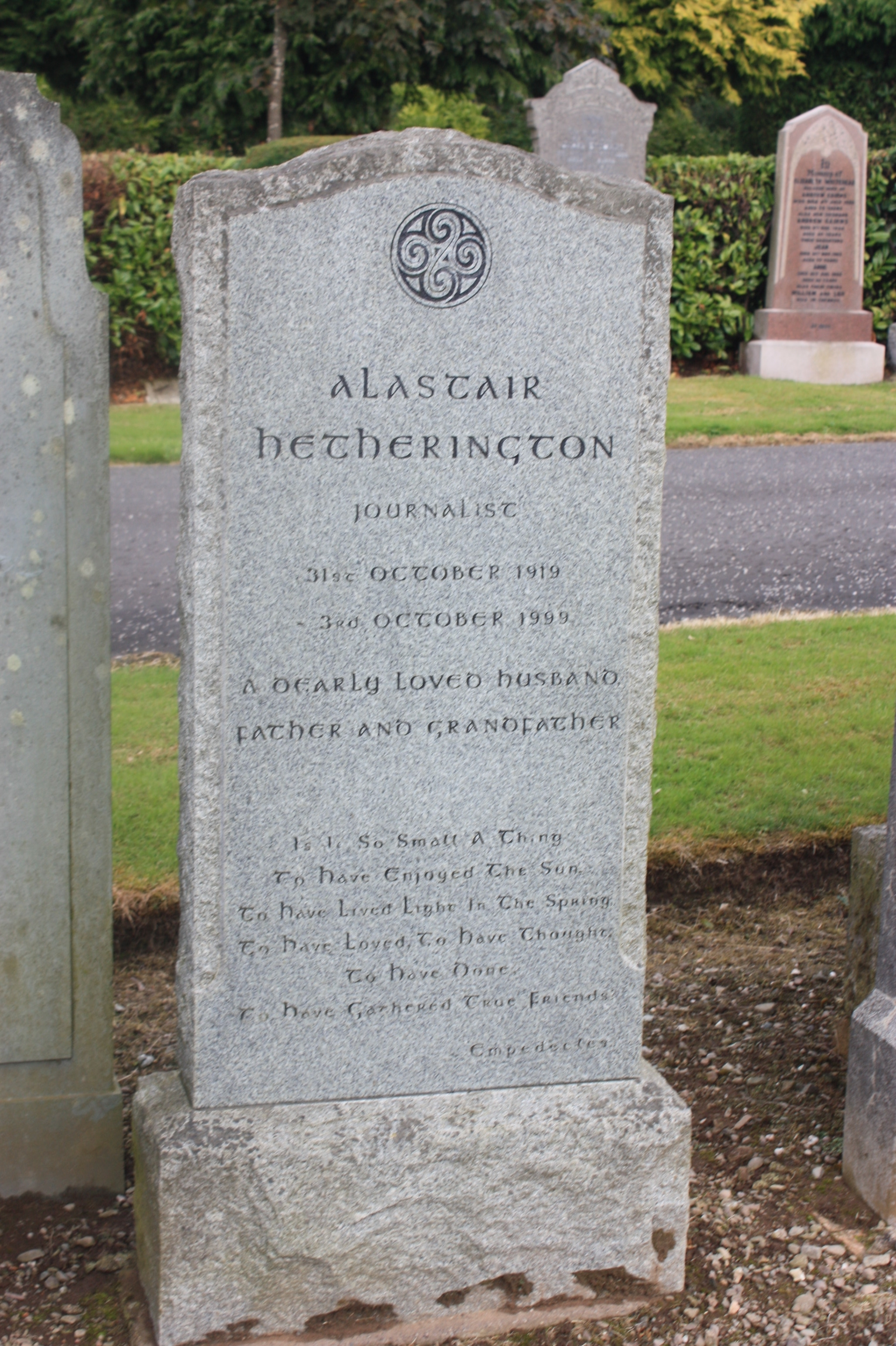
Alistair Hetherington's grave, Tillicoultry

== Publications ==
- The Bedside Guardian 9: A Selection from the Manchester Guardian 1959–1960 (foreword/editor) (London: Collins, 1960)
- Guardian Years (London: Chatto & Windus, 1981) ISBN 978-0-7011-2552-3
- News, Newspapers and Television (London: Macmillan, 1985) ISBN 978-0-333-38606-4
- News in the Regions: Plymouth Sound to Moray Firth (Basingstoke, UK: Macmillan, 1989) ISBN 0-333-48231-X
- Highlands and Islands: A Generation of Progress (Aberdeen University Press, 1990) ISBN 0-08-037980-X
- Inside BBC Scotland 1975–80: A Personal View (Edinburgh: Whitewater, 1992) ISBN 0-9519619-0-X
- A Walker's Guide to Arran (1995)

== Honours ==
- Honorary Fellow, Corpus Christi College, Oxford, 1971
- Named Journalist of the Year in the National Press Awards, 1971

Media offices
| Preceded by A. P. Wadsworth | Editor of The Guardian; 1956–1975 | Succeeded by Peter Preston |
