= Om Malik =

Indian-American writer (1966–2026)

- ॐ प्रकाश मलिक
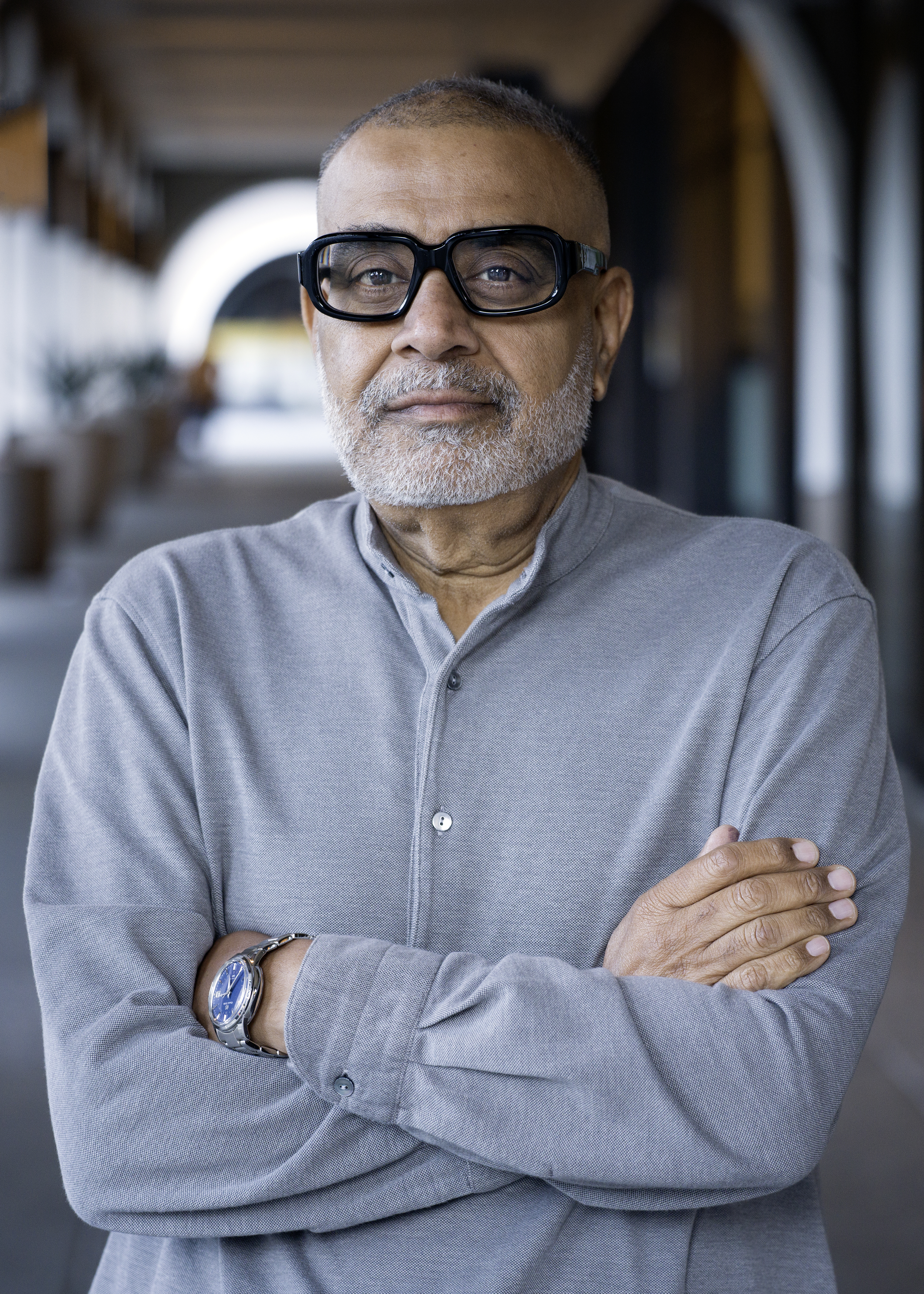
- Malik in 2025
- Born: Om Prakash Malik; September 29, 1966; New Delhi, India
- Died: June 24, 2026 (aged 59); Palo Alto, California, U.S.
- Education: St. Stephen's College, Delhi; Delhi University
- Website: om.co

Om Prakash Malik (Hindi: ॐ प्रकाश मलिक; September 29, 1966 – June 24, 2026) was an Indian-American web and technology writer and journalist. He founded Gigaom, an early influential technology news website, that covered developments in startups and Silicon Valley and wrote articles published in venues such as The Wall Street Journal, The New Yorker, Fast Company, and Wired. He was a partner at True Ventures, a venture capital firm in Palo Alto, and continued blogging on his personal website, On my Om.

== Life and career ==
=== Early life and education ===
Malik was born on September 29, 1966, and grew up in a middle-class family in New Delhi. His mother taught high-school Sanskrit and his father was an Indian Army officer. He graduated from St. Stephen's College, Delhi, affiliated with Delhi University, in 1986, with an honors degree in chemistry.

=== Career ===
After graduating, Malik first got into the news business working as a typesetter in India. He had several journalism positions in New Delhi, including with VP Fun and Newsmen Features, where he specialized in lifestyle articles. He moved to London and then spent time in Eastern Europe, following which he moved to New York City in 1993. Wanting a career in journalism, but not knowing anyone in New York, he got a job selling suitcases across the street from the former Yankee Stadium in the Bronx. He would work all day and then go across the street and watch the New York Yankees from the upper deck. He eventually landed a position as a reporter for India Abroad and then for Forbes. He was also a senior writer for Red Herring, focusing on the telecommunications sector. In late 1994, he launched DesiParty.com, an events site for South Asian immigrants. Also in 1994, he co-founded the South Asian Journalists Association (SAJA), and helped launch the now-defunct magazine, Masala, and its website Masala.com, a South Asian portal.

Malik was a senior editor on the original team at Forbes.com, founded in 1997 and led by David Churbuck. In 1999, he left Forbes.com to work as an investment manager at Hambrecht & Quist Asia Pacific; his stay there was brief because he decided he preferred writing and reporting. In 2000, he moved to San Francisco, California to write for Business 2.0 magazine. He wrote later that his interest in learning and writing about technology and networks drew him to the city. In 2001, he started Gigaom, a personal blog, and in 2006, he founded the media company. The GigaOm website was ranked among the top 50 blogs worldwide, according to Technorati, and it was listed in the Blog 100 Index by CNET. Malik's book, Broadbandits: Inside the $750 Billion Telecom Heist, was released in 2003. It investigated fraud by telecom companies during the dot-com bubble. Malik announced on June 12, 2006, that he was going to work on Gigaom full-time, although he continued to be a contributing editor and had a regular column in Business 2.0 until its demise in October 2007.

In July 2006, Malik wrote a post about Twitter that was credited as one of the first media coverages of the social networking service, although it got much of the story wrong. From July 2007 to March 2008, he hosted the podcast The GigaOm Show on Revision3 with Joyce Kim, which focused on technology and business. He appeared frequently on television and in the media as a technology expert. The press critic, writer, and New York University journalism professor, Jay Rosen, described GigaOm as a website at the intersection of business, technology, and digital media, built around "the tech moxy, analytical gifts and entrepreneurial spirit of Om Malik".

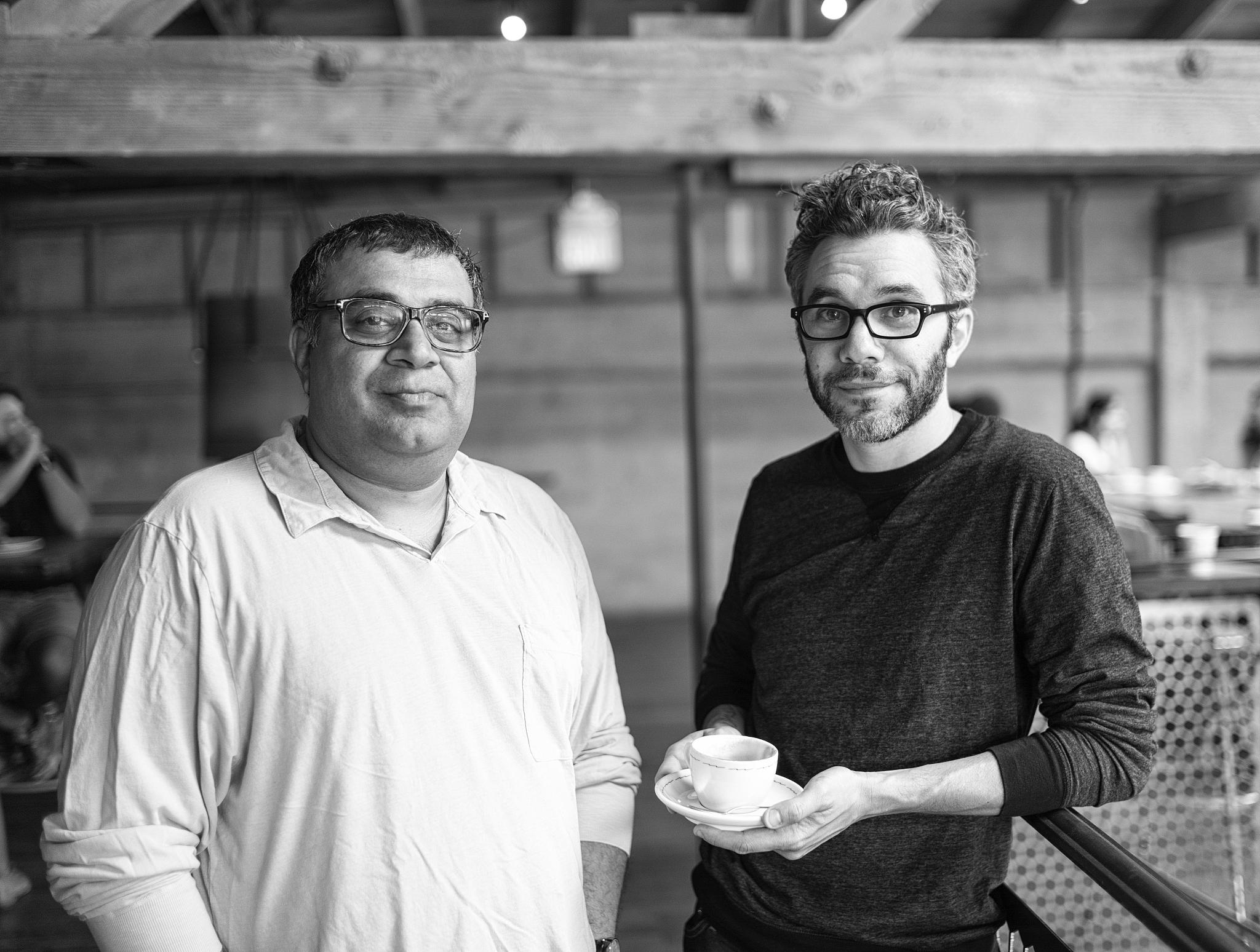
Malik with Nick Bilton in 2014

Malik left Gigaom in January 2014. In March 2015, the company ceased operations due to financial difficulty. In May 2015, it was acquired by Knowingly Corporation. He wrote regularly on technology in the 2010s for The New Yorker,, Fast Company,, and Wired, and appeared as a tech trend commentator on broadcast outlets including BBC Television, BBC Radio, NPR, and Bloomberg West.

In an article he wrote in 2016 for The New Yorker, Malik declared that the technology industry was lacking in emotional intelligence, and that "Silicon Valley's biggest failing is not poor marketing of its products, or follow-through on promises, but, rather, the distinct lack of empathy for those whose lives are disturbed by its technological wizardry". He pointed out that new technology also represents the destruction of legacy industries and the displacement of jobs on which many people depend for their livelihoods and their personal identity.

In later years, he worked on a newsletter, Crazy Stupid Tech, with the journalist Fred Vogelstein. In an interview by the Italian writer Manuel "Manu" Moreale in 2024, Malik said that he did his writing in airports, planes, the back seat of a cab, cafes, or by the side of the road if he was suddenly inspired. He converted a spare room at home into an office during the pandemic, but used it mostly for photo editing with a Mac Studio and a large monitor. He worked using an iPad with a keyboard as his computer. He told Moreale that he started most of his writing in Japanese notebooks made especially for fountain pens, of which he had many, and that his favorite pen was 100 years old.

In a 2024 post at his personal blog, Malik credited the work of Dave Winer for kick-starting his blogging journey:

It would be an understatement to say that Dave Winer has been influential in my life. His pioneering work set me on the path of blogging. I wouldn't be where I am without blogging, as my ideal medium of expression. Sure, I was a professional journalist, but my blog was me, my voice, and my way of thinking–in public, for all to see, warts and all. Social behaviors of today were cooked up in the lab called blogs. And many of those ideas came from the desk (and brain) of Dave Winer. I was, am, and will always be a fan of the 'blogfather'.

== Personal life and death ==
The business, technology, and media analyst, Ben Thompson, posted on his website Stratechery an interview of Malik he conducted in 2024. Malik began his story with these words:

... my life is I accidentally found myself writing about technology and the Internet [...] I think for me the lack of communication was something which shaped my life and my world view a lot. So when we got a phone, my parents got a phone, I'm from India, so we had a religious celebration, we had a puja in the house, and it was like the whole neighborhood celebrated because everybody had a phone a little closer to them. My relationships with people changed. I had friends who were not living in my neighborhood and they were living further away, I had school friends I became closer to because we could talk on the phone, except my parents would yell at me that you can't be talking too long because it costs too much money. I had my first girlfriend because I could use a phone. It shaped my life experience because communication made my world much smaller.

According to a 1998 article in The New York Times, Malik would sneak out to dance clubs when he was a high school student in New Delhi during the 1980s. While living in London in 1990, he acquired an affinity for bhangra, popular music that was rooted in Punjabi traditional music, but had evolved with techno elements. When he moved to New York in 1993 to work as a freelance journalist, he was surprised that there were few dance parties for South Asians in the city. Consequently, in 1994, while working as a writer at Forbes Digital Tool, he founded the Desi Party Zone Web site, using the Hindi term Desi, "a South Asian version of homeboy", to publicize such events. "I wanted to spread the party movement", Malik said, "I'm a grown man and I still like to party".

In December 2007, Malik suffered a heart attack at age 41, caused, he said, by smoking, alcohol and a fatty diet. At the time, his online avatar featured a graphic of him wearing a newsman's fedora and chewing on a cigar, and he had been working mostly out of a Starbucks shop in San Francisco. The heart attack forced him to reconsider his priorities.

In an online tribute, the technology blogger and Apple enthusiast John Gruber quotes Malik after he left his namesake website GigaOm in 2014:

I relate to [Derek] Jeter's desire to find life outside of work. Living a 24-hour news life has come at a personal cost. I still wake in middle of the night to check the stream to see if something is breaking, worrying whether I missed some news.

According to Gruber, he had texted Malik on June 1, 2026, to coordinate meeting at the Worldwide Developers Conference (WWDC) the following week, and that was when Malik revealed that he'd been hospitalized in the ICU at Stanford since mid-April. He needed a heart transplant or he would die, but even so, for the past few weeks, he had been writing and doing analysis prolifically, writing from a bed in the ICU. Gruber writes:

Om loved good coffee, nice watches, exotic pens, Apple products, the media industry, photography, [...] and the New York Yankees [...] it was the Yankees we talked about most. He loved about the Yankees what I love about the Yankees—that they embody the pursuit of excellence.

Malik died in Palo Alto, California on June 24, 2026, at the age of 59, "after a long health journey with his heart", according to his family. He never married or had children. In a remembrance of his friend, Fred Vogelstein wrote of joining Malik in 2024 at his "outdoor office", a bench in San Francisco's South Park, for a conversation that led to the launch of their newsletter, Crazy Stupid Tech. Vogelstein wrote, "Sitting on a bench with Om could be quasi religious. He talked so softly and deliberately that it forced you to slow down, lean in and forget about everything else."

He was a collector of fine watches; upon learning of his death, Benjamin Clymer, the founder of the New York City–based watch website Hodinkee, wrote an encomium for his friend and fellow collector. Clymer noted that Malik had bought one of the first Seiko Credor Eichi II watches in the world when it was released, and also had Moser and Ressence watches in his collection. He supported independent watchmakers such as Laurent Ferrier and Autodromo, and cultivated friendships with the people behind the brands.

Malik described himself on his personal blog On My Om (Om.co) as an amateur photographer and a Leica Camera enthusiast, saying that he began to learn the basics of photography—color, light and composition—by using his iPhone and learning from more experienced friends on Instagram. He got more serious about his photography in 2014 when he bought a Sony RX100 point-and-shoot camera. In 2015, he bought a digital Leica, which he carried at all times. He later wrote that the essential thing he learned about photo-taking is that "what we create is merely a reflection of what's inside us—and who we are".

The photographer and entrepreneur Christopher Michel wrote an essay portrait of Malik for the National Academies' "New Heroes" project, which "celebra[tes] the people behind our greatest scientific, medical, and technological advances" through portraiture and storytelling. He writes:

To me, he is more than a friend. He is a guide. A mirror. A constant. One of the rare people whose way of being makes everyone around him want to be better.

WordPress co-founder Matt Mullenweg, a personal friend of Malik, paid tribute to his fellow blogger, calling him "my best friend" in a post and publicly announced plans for an event in Om's honor to be held on September 29, 2026, in San Francisco, on what would have been his 60th birthday.
