= Poppy Noor =

British newspaper columnist (born c. 1991)

- Born: c. 1991
- Education: Trinity College, Cambridge; Goldsmiths, University of London
- Occupation: Columnist

Poppy Noor (born c. 1991) is an English columnist working for Guardian US. She has also written for other publications and appeared on television and radio news programmes. After a difficult childhood and a period of homelessness, Noor was admitted to Trinity College, Cambridge. She worked in local government before winning a Scott Trust bursary for postgraduate study and becoming a Commissioning Editor for The Guardian Housing Network. Her journalism covers race, social justice and community. Since late 2019 her role at Guardian US has a focus on "social news" in New York.

== Early life ==
Noor grew up in an immigrant working-class family to an English mother and Bangladeshi father. Her early life was spent in Plaistow, Newham. Her mother experienced schizophrenia and her father worked long hours as a driver, later working as a car cleaner. Noor and her two older brothers helped raise her four younger siblings; she later wrote that she has supported her family financially "for as long as (she) can remember". She was briefly taken into care, and left home at 16, sleeping on friend's sofas as she was not able to obtain her own accommodation due to not being recognised as officially homeless. After starting at a school in London Borough of Camden, She was referred to a homeless person's support team that provided bed and breakfast, and later housed in a series of hostels.

Following good first-year results in her A-levels, Noor's tutors encouraged her to apply to the University of Cambridge, and she was offered a place at Trinity College, Cambridge, to study Politics, Psychology and Sociology. She wrote in The Times in 2016 that she found it hard to adjust to life at the university, stating that "I have never forgotten the intense alienation of my first night." Whilst at Trinity, she was awarded sporting colours for football.

After graduating, Noor worked in local government in East London. She trained as a social worker, before being awarded a Scott Trust bursary for a postgraduate degree at Goldsmiths, University of London.

== Journalism career ==
Noor subsequently became a Commissioning Editor for The Guardian Housing Network. She also worked as a freelance journalist. She was a reporter in the London office of The Guardian before transferring, in late 2019 to a Guardian US role covering "social news" in New York and encompassing celebrity interviews.

Noor has also written for Vice, The Times, The Independent, The Psychologist and the British Medical Journal She has made several television appearances, including as a reporter for Channel 4 News in 2018. Her journalism often features themes around race, social justice and community.

== Awards and nominations ==
Outcome	Year	Awards	Category	Notes	Ref
Winner	2015	Women Inspiration Enterprise	Generation Award		
Winner	2017	Inspiring Leadership Trust	Inspiring Diversity Award		

== Media appearances ==
Year	Programme	Role	Notes	Ref
2014	Channel 4 News	participant		
2017	Newsnight	participant	BBC Two	
2017	Asian Network's Big Debate	participant	BBC Radio Asian Network	
2017	Channel 4 News	participant		
2018	Channel 4 News	participant		
2018	Channel 4 News	reporter		
2018	Free thinking: are we being manipulated?	participant	BBC Radio 3	
