= Janine Gibson =

Janine Gibson may refer to:

- Janine Gibson (journalist), British journalist
- Janine Gibson (politician), leader of the Green Party of Manitoba
