= Silicon Alley Reporter =

American trade publication

Silicon Alley Reporter was an American trade publication focused on New York's Silicon Alley.

Founded by Jason Calacanis in 1996, then was renamed the Venture Reporter in 2001 and was eventually sold to Dow Jones in 2003.

Rafat Ali served as Managing Editor before founding paidContent.org and its parent company ContentNext Media.

Notable contributors include Xeni Jardin, Rafat Ali and Clay Shirky. The parent company of Silicon Alley Reporter and Venture Reporter was called Rising Tide Studios.

Karol Martesko-Fenster collaborated with Jason Calacanis and Gordon Gould from 1997 to 1999 on the launch of Silicon Alley Reporter prior to joining Rising Tide Studios in April 1999. He served as President & Publisher until mid-2001.

Doug Mintz, now a Chambers-rated bankruptcy lawyer, served as editorial director in 2000-2001 and helped create the spinoff Venture Reporter.

The Silicon Alley Reporter 100, the list of the 100 most influential people in New York Technology, was published annually.
