= Rachel Cook =

Rachel Cook may refer to:

- Rachael Leigh Cook (born 1979), American actress
- Rachel Scott (women's education reformer) (1848–1905, born Rachel Susan Cook), Scottish reformer

== See also ==
- Rachel Cooke, British journalist and writer
