= John Russell Scott =

British publisher (1879–1949)

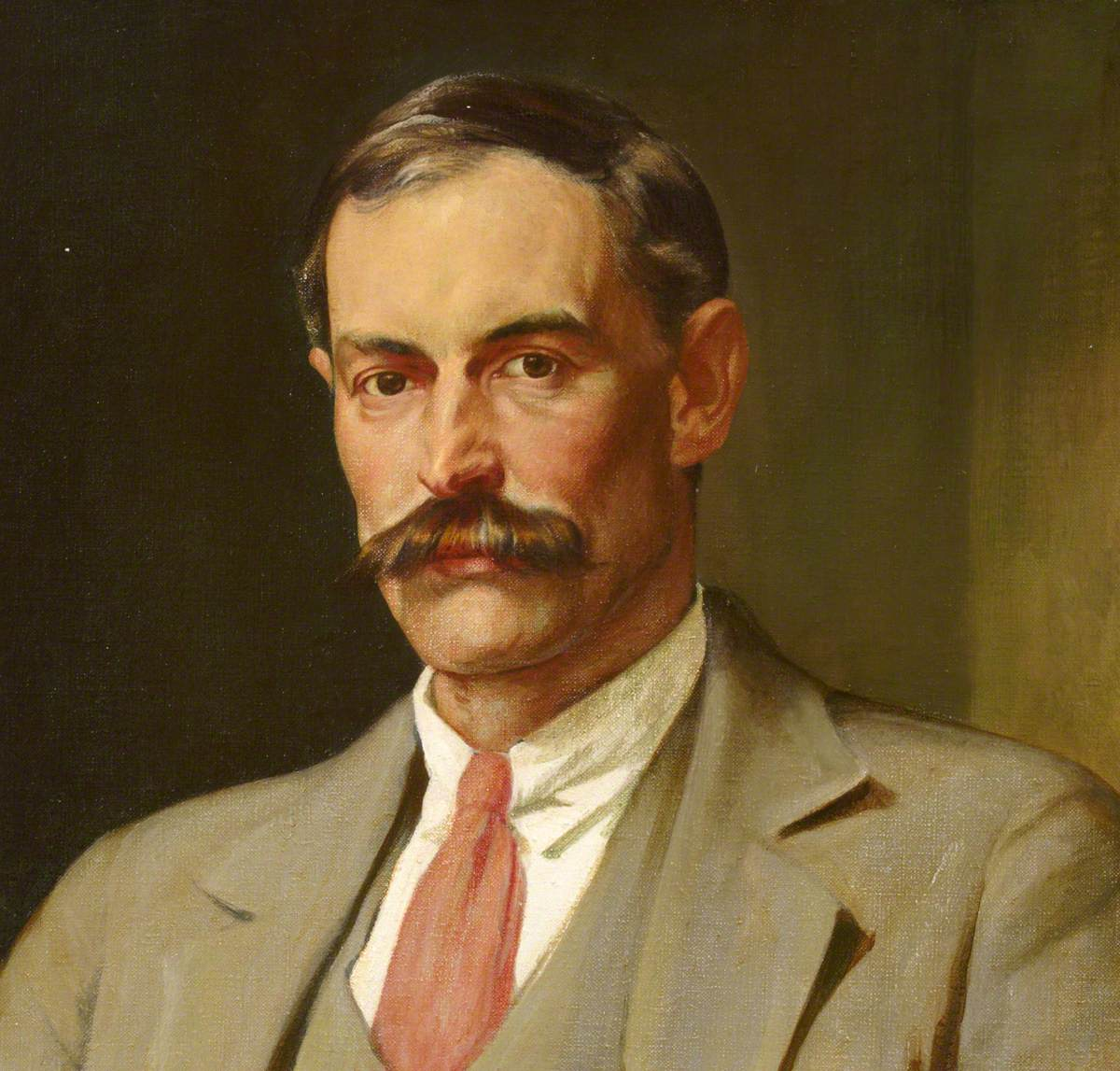
- John Russell Scott by Francis Dodd
- Born: 12 July 1879; Manchester, England
- Died: 5 April 1949 (aged 69)
- Occupation: publisher
- Known for: Managing/Chairing Manchester Guardian & Evening News Ltd; founding the Scott Trust
- Parents: Charles Prestwich Scott (father); Rachel Susan Cook (mother)

John Russell Scott (12 July 1879 – 5 April 1949) was a British publisher and media proprietor. As managing director and later chairman and governing director of The Manchester Guardian and Evening News Ltd, he oversaw the 1924 acquisition of the Manchester Evening News by the Manchester Guardian, bringing both titles under common ownership. In 1936 he created the Scott Trust to preserve the financial and editorial independence of the Guardian "as nearly as may be upon the same principles" on which it had been run before.

== Early life ==
Scott was born in Manchester, the second son and third child of editor Charles Prestwich Scott and Rachel Susan Cook. He was educated at Rugby School and studied engineering at Trinity College, Cambridge, later undertaking further engineering studies at the Massachusetts Institute of Technology.

== Career ==
At the request of his father, Scott became managing director of the Manchester Guardian in 1905. In 1924 he purchased the Manchester Evening News, reuniting the evening title with the Manchester Guardian and forming The Manchester Guardian and Evening News Ltd, of which he served as chairman and governing director.

On 1 January 1932, C. P. Scott died at the age of 85, and control passed to his son Edward Taylor Scott; however, Edward drowned four months later, whereupon John Russell Scott became the sole controlling owner of the company. He continued to run the group on restrained managerial pay and reinvested profits in the newspapers' growth and facilities.

=== Scott Trust ===
In June 1936, to prevent future death duties from forcing a sale or jeopardising independence, Scott transferred ownership of the Manchester Guardian and Manchester Evening News, valued at over £1 million, to a new trust (the Scott Trust). The trust deed required that the papers be "carried on, as nearly as may be, upon the same principles as heretofore". His close adviser and future Lord Chancellor Gavin Simonds told him: "You are trying to do something which is very repugnant to the law of England. You are trying to divest yourself of a property right."

In 1948, following legal advice that the Guardian could still be exposed to death duties on John Scott's death, the Trust was reconstituted: the beneficiaries of the 1936 deed handed their shares to the new trustees. The Scott family's power to appoint trustees ended and appointments became a collective act. The Scott Trust model — later reorganised in 2008 as Scott Trust Limited — remains the owner of Guardian Media Group and exists to secure the Guardian's financial and editorial independence in perpetuity.

== Personal life ==
In 1908 Scott married Olga Briggs. The couple had two sons and two daughters, and lived in Wilmslow, Cheshire. Of their children, the best known was their elder son, Laurence Prestwich Scott (1909–1983), who served as managing director of the publishing company from September 1947 to October 1967 and as its chairman from April 1949 to November 1973. When Guardian Newspapers Limited (GNL) was established in 1967, he became its chairman.

== Death ==
Scott died in Manchester on 5 April 1949, aged 69. He had asked that, on his death, little should be said of him, that he had been "only a businessman" and had "done nothing". The New York Times wrote that "he kept the Guardian's purpose high, its vision clear, its spirit strong and fresh". His obituary in The Guardian praised his modesty and "wise business management", crediting him with safeguarding the paper's independence through the trust structure that still underpins The Guardian's ownership.
