= Liz Forgan =

English journalist and media executive (born 1944)

Dame Elizabeth Anne Lucy Forgan DBE (born 31 August 1944), known as Liz Forgan, is an English journalist, and radio and television executive.

== Early life ==
Forgan was educated at Benenden School, Kent, and St Hugh's College, Oxford, then an all-female college. She initially worked on newspapers starting with the Teheran Journal as Arts Editor 1967–68, at the Hampstead and Highgate Express (1969–74), and on London's Evening Standard (1974–78, and later as a columnist 1997–98).

She was editor of The Guardian's women's pages from 1978 to 1982, a Guardian columnist during 1997 and 1998, becoming a non-executive director of the Guardian Media Group from 1998.

== Media management ==
Forgan was a founding commissioning editor and then Director of Programmes at the UK's Channel 4 from 1981 to 1990.

She joined the BBC in 1993 to become managing director, BBC Network Radio where she developed the format for BBC Radio 5 Live and launched the BBC's digital radio service. At its launch, the BBC's digital radio service used the obsolete DAB standard with Forgan ignoring the recommendation of BBC engineers that the launch be delayed and strongly recommending the use of the soon to be ratified DAB+ technology which had to subsequently be adopted.

She left the BBC in February 1996 over a disagreement with John Birt, then BBC Director General, over the decision to move BBC Radio News from Broadcasting House to Television Centre.

Forgan was appointed the sixth chairman of The Scott Trust in 2003, the owner of the Guardian newspapers.

== Public organisations ==
Between 2001 and 2008, Forgan was the Chair of the National Heritage Memorial Fund and Heritage Lottery Fund.

She is also board member of the Conservatoire for Dance and Drama, Trustee of the Royal Anniversary Trust, a former board member of the British Film Institute, a Trustee of the Media Trust, and Chair of the Churches Conservation Trust.

In February 2009, Forgan became Chair of Arts Council England, the first woman to head the British arts funding organisation. Appointed in the last year of a Labour Government, she was viewed with suspicion by the Conservative-Liberal Democrat coalition. In the October 2010 Government spending review, the Arts Council suffered a 29.6% funding cut, and was also ordered to halve its administrative costs.

== Honours ==
Forgan was promoted to Dame Commander of the Order of the British Empire for services to Radio Broadcasting in 2006, having previously been appointed OBE in 1998. In 2014, she was elected an Honorary Fellow of the British Academy.

== See also ==
- Jill Tweedie for details of the National Portrait Gallery Group portrait of Forgan, Tweedie, Polly Toynbee and Mary Stott (editors of Guardian's Women's Page) and Posy Simmonds.
