= Contributoria =

Former Independent journalism network

Contributoria was an independent journalism network founded by Matt McAlister, Sarah Hartley and Dan Catt. It operated as a division of Guardian Media Group, the company that owns British daily national newspaper The Guardian. It launched on 6 January 2014, and published its final issue on 1 September 2015 after running for 21 issues in print and online.

== Purpose ==
Sarah Hartley, editor and co-founder of the platform has said, "Contributoria is designed to operate like a cooperative and inspire professional writers and journalists to support each other. Finding new ways to fund quality journalism for freelance writers will help keep a diversity of published voices online. I encourage all journalists and writers to join up and help shape what could be the future of writing."

== Funding ==
The platform was initially funded as a winner of the News Innovation Contest from the International Press Institute and sponsored by Google.

== Development ==
In March 2015, Contributoria introduced a new feature called 'Topics' which allows NGOs, media outlets and commercial companies to commission stories through the platform.
