= William Percival Crozier =

British journalist and newspaper editor (1879–1944)

William Percival Crozier (1 August 1879 – 16 April 1944) was a British journalist and editor of the Manchester Guardian from 1932, when he succeeded Ted Scott, who had died in a sailing accident, until his death in 1944.

Crozier was born at Stanhope in County Durham on 1 August 1879, the youngest son of Rev. Richard Crozier, a Methodist minister, and his wife, Elizabeth Hallimond. He was educated at Manchester Grammar School and Trinity College, Oxford, where he gained a first class degree in Classics (1900).

After leaving Oxford, he spent a year as a schoolmaster in Knaresborough, before abandoning teaching for journalism, joining first The Times and then the Manchester Guardian in 1903. He made an impression with his critical analysis of the case for tariff reform, and quickly came to the attention of the Guardian's then editor, C. P. Scott, who, recognising Crozier's potential, made him his right-hand man at the paper in charge of news gathering. In 1912 Crozier was made news editor and in 1918 military critic. He also later served as foreign editor. Under Scott, Crozier reorganized the Guardian's foreign news service, increased the use of photographs and maps, encouraged new features and introduced the daily crossword in 1929. He also developed a deep commitment to Zionism and became "the leading advocate in the daily press of a Jewish national home" (Morris).

Crozier was made a member of the Manchester Guardian's board and was appointed editor in April 1932 after the death of Edward Taylor Scott. Crozier's appointment was in part intended to guarantee editorial continuity, and he maintained a close control over the paper, frequently contributing leading articles and editorials. Foreign news had always been Crozier's chief interest and his editorship coincided with the establishment of the National Socialist regime in Germany and the Second World War. Working closely with his friend and sometime German correspondent, F. A. Voigt, Crozier "considered it no less than his duty personally and persistently to expose the Nazis" (Morris) and pursued this policy with a crusading zeal until the very end. In the late 1930s his health became increasingly frail and he suffered from a perforated ulcer in 1936. In June 1936 he was elected to serve on the Liberal Party Council. In 1943 he was diagnosed with the heart condition which proved ultimately to be fatal.

Crozier died at his Manchester home on 16 April 1944, aged 64, just two months before his son Major S.F. Crozier was part of the Military Police operations overseeing logistics landings using the Mulberry Harbours at Gold Beach (Arromanche) after D-Day. He was 'mentioned in dispatches' for this work and later awarded the MBE.

== Novels ==
- Letters of Pontius Pilate: Written During His Governorship of Judea to His Friend Seneca in Rome (1928)
- The Fates are Laughing (1945; published posthumously)

Media offices
Preceded by Ted Scott	Editor of The Manchester Guardian; 1932–1944	Succeeded by Alfred Powell Wadsworth
