= Manchester Evening News =

British daily newspaper for North West England

- Manchester Evening News front page on 29 December 2017
- Type: Daily newspaper
- Format: Tabloid
- Owner: Reach plc
- Editor: Sarah Lester
- Founded: 1868; 158 years ago
- Political alignment: Labour
- Headquarters: Chadderton, Greater Manchester, England
- Circulation: 4,135 (as of 2026)
- ISSN: 0962-2276
- OCLC number: 500150526
- Website: www.manchestereveningnews.co.uk

The Manchester Evening News (MEN) is a regional daily newspaper covering Greater Manchester in North West England, founded in 1868. It is published Monday–Saturday; a Sunday edition, the MEN on Sunday, was launched in February 2019. The newspaper is owned by publishing group Reach plc (formerly Trinity Mirror).^{[2]}

Since adopting a 'digital-first' strategy in 2014, the MEN has experienced significant online growth, despite its average print daily circulation for the first half of 2021 falling to 22,107. In the 2018 British Regional Press Awards, it was named Newspaper of the Year and Website of the Year.

== History ==
=== Formation and The Guardian ownership ===
The Manchester Evening News was first published on 10 October 1868 by Mitchell Henry as part of his parliamentary election campaign, its first issue four pages long and costing a halfpenny. The newspaper was run from a small office on Brown Street, with approximately a dozen staff. Upon the newspaper's launch, Henry said: "In putting ourselves into print, we have no apology to offer, but the assurance of an honest aim to serve the public interest." Henry's quote is displayed on the entrance wall to the newspaper's modern offices.

With his Parliamentary bid unsuccessful, Henry lost interest in the business, selling the publication to John Edward Taylor Jr., the son of newspaper proprietor John Edward Taylor, founder of the Manchester Guardian (now The Guardian). The newspaper became the evening counterpart and sister title to The Manchester Guardian and the two titles began sharing an office, located on Cross Street, from 1879. Taylor brought his brother-in-law Peter Allen in as a partner in the Manchester Evening News and, after Taylor's death in 1907, the Guardian was sold to its editor C. P. Scott while the Evening News passed into the hands of the Allen family. In 1924, C. P. Scott's son John Russell Scott reunited the papers, buying out the Manchester Evening News and forming The Manchester Guardian and Evening News Ltd, which in turn later became the Guardian Media Group (GMG).

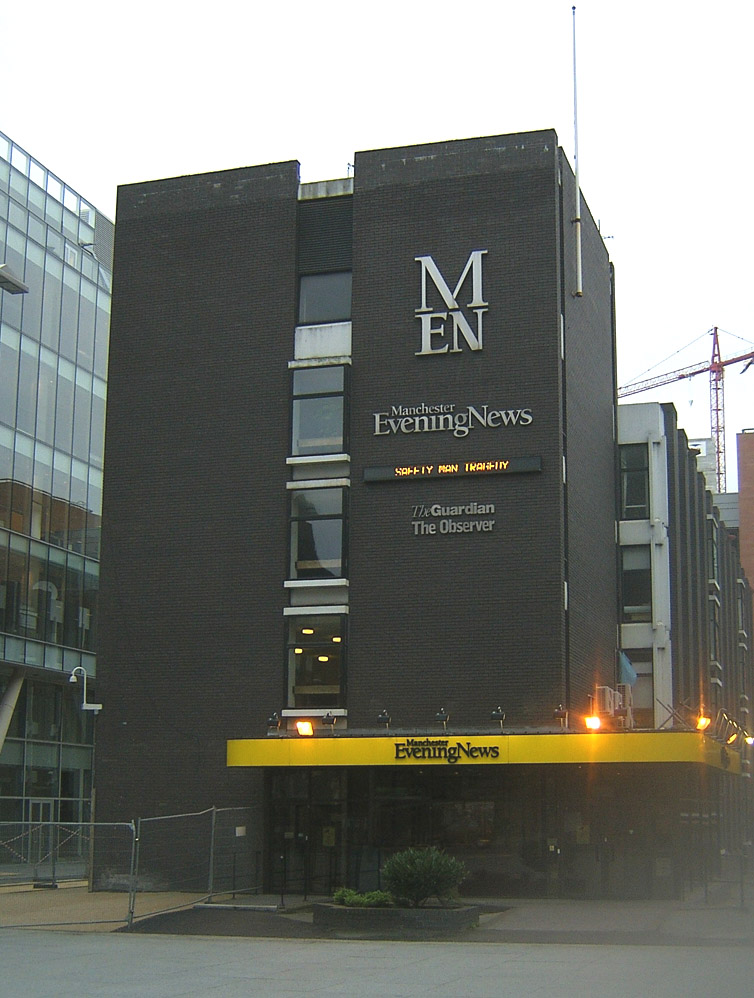
The former offices at Spinningfield

In 1936, John Russell Scott formed the Scott Trust in order to protect the company from death duties, following the deaths of his father and younger brother Ted in close succession. The contents of the original deeds were not disclosed by the company, but a copy obtained by The Independent revealed the terms compelled trustees to "use their best endeavours to procure that the [...] Manchester Guardian and Manchester Evening News [...] shall be carried on as nearly as may be upon the same principles as they have heretofore." (Note: Clause 9 of the Trust Deed states: "The Settlors whilst not purporting to impose any binding trust or obligation in that respect desire that the persons becoming entitled to the Settled Funds shall use the best of their endeavours to procure that the business of the Company shall be continued and that the Manchester Guardian and Manchester Evening News or any other paper or papers or other medium for collecting and disseminating news comment or opinion in which the Company the Company's successors or any subsidiary company of either of them shall then be interested shall be carried on as nearly as may be upon the same principles as they have heretofore been conducted and carried on while under the guidance of the said John Russell Scott and his family and the Trustees of the 1936 Settlement.")

During the editorship of William Haley (who later became the Director-General of the BBC and subsequently the editor of The Times) in the 1930s, the newspaper's circulation grew to over 200,000. By 1939 the publication was the largest provincial evening newspaper in the country. The newspaper was a cash cow for its parent company and kept its stablemate The Manchester Guardian afloat. The financial success of the Manchester Evening News was reflected in Haley's salary, which was even greater than John Scott's, with Scott himself acknowledging, "after all, you make the money we spend."

In 1961, The Manchester Guardian and Evening News Ltd bought out the Manchester Evening News's ailing rival, the Manchester Evening Chronicle, and two years later, merged the papers. Following this, the Manchester Evening News's circulation increased to over 480,000.

From 2004 until July 2009, the newspaper collaborated with Channel M to produce that Manchester-area TV station's flagship programme, the 5pm weeknight edition of Channel M News. The programme later expanded to include bulletins at breakfast, lunchtime and late evening, a weekly review programme, and also occasional live specials.

=== Trinity Mirror acquisition ===
In December 2009, GMG confirmed it had held "exploratory talks" about selling the Manchester Evening News, following a report by The Daily Telegraph which named Trinity Mirror as a potential buyer and claimed the "disposal would amount to a fire sale" due to the current value of the business. The title estimated the Manchester Evening News alone to be worth about £200 million prior to the collapse in newspaper advertising.

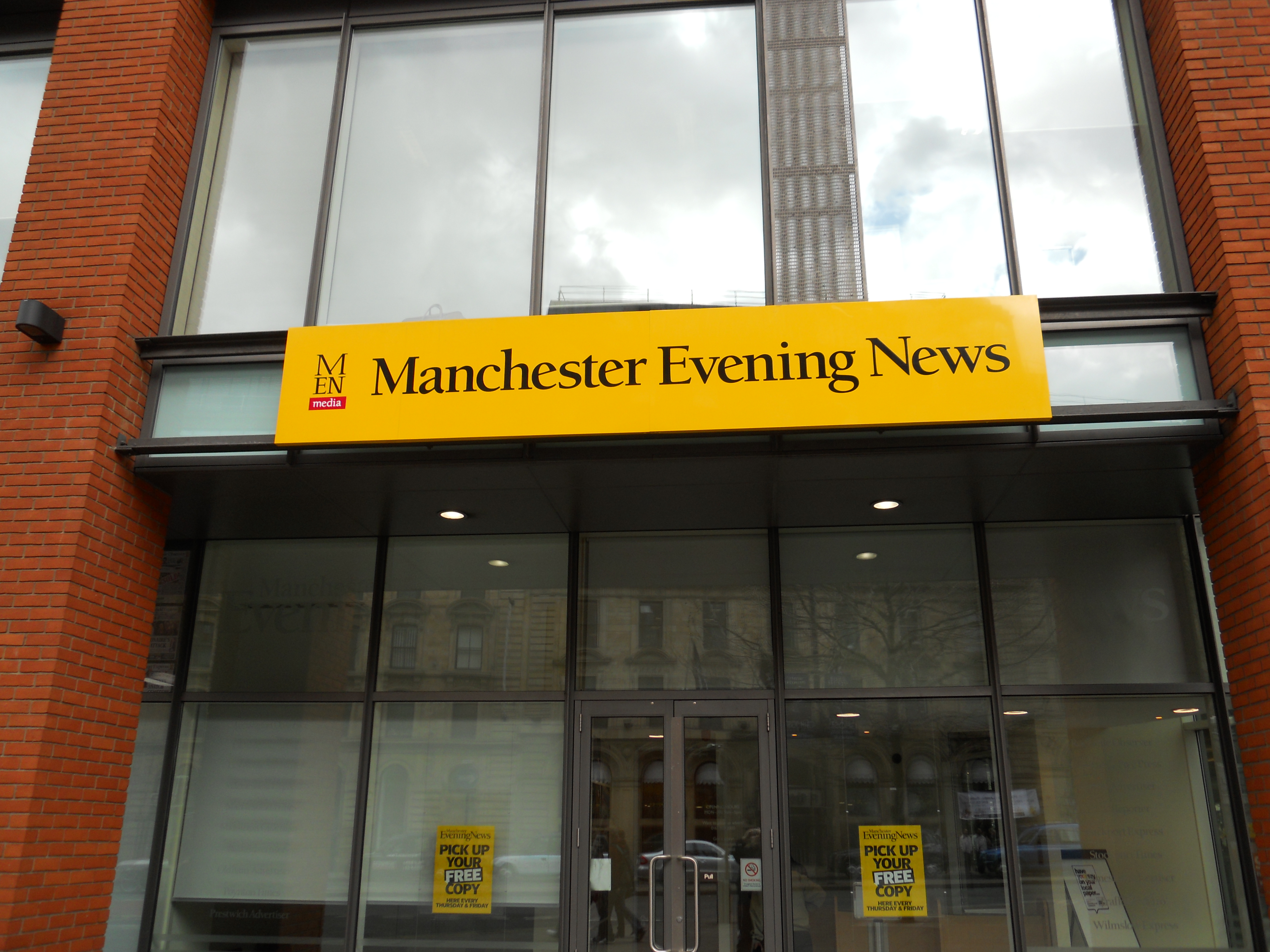
The office in Portland Street

In February 2010, the Manchester Evening News was sold along with GMG's 31 other regional titles to Trinity Mirror, severing the historic link between The Guardian and the Manchester Evening News. The sale was valued at £44.8 million: £7.4 million in cash and the remainder from GMG extricating itself from a £37.4 million decade-long contract with Trinity Mirror to print its regional titles. The sale of GMG's regional arm was negotiated to offset company losses, with The Guardian and its Sunday title Observer accruing losses of £100,000 a day. The sale was described by stockbrokers Numis as "the deal of the decade" for Sly Bailey, Trinity Mirror's chief executive, while The Guardian's Steve Busfield said the sale was indicative of the declining business value of regional media, comparing the sale to that of Johnston Press's acquisition of 53 regional titles including The Yorkshire Post eight years earlier, for £560 million.

In the year prior to the newspaper's sale, GMG had reduced the number of journalists at the newspaper to 50. Judy Gordon, the National Union of Journalists mother of the chapel, said: "The Guardian has not got any money of its own. It has only got what other people give it. We've made all those changes to stem the fact that our profits are dropping. Then they ask: 'How much can you give us now? Nothing? OK, Bye.'"

The Manchester Evening News headquarters were relocated from Scott Place in the Spinningfields area of Manchester city centre to an existing Trinity Mirror plant in Chadderton, where other Trinity Mirror titles in North West England are printed. In 2013, the title surpassed 10 million monthly online readers for the first time, recording 10,613,119 visitors.

In late 2025, The Manchester Evening News launched a paywall for the first time, but most of its content will remain accessible for free.

== Editions ==
Despite its "evening" title, the newspaper began publication of a morning edition in November 2004, a controversial move which brought union members to the brink of strike action over new work rotas.

=== "Football Green" and "Football Pink" ===
For years the paper was famous for its "Football Green" edition. After the MEN merged with the rival Manchester Evening Chronicle in the 1960s, its more popular "Sporting Pink" was adopted as the "Football Pink". The "Football Pink" was first issued in 1904 as part of the Manchester Evening Chronicle, which was owned by Manchester City chairman Sir Edward Hulton, 1st Baronet.

The "Green" and "Pink" names came from being printed in paper of those colours. In the 1970s the Saturday sports paper began using white newsprint, which had become by then the industry standard. The football results were added to a pre-printed newspaper using small presses in newspaper vans usually parked near the stadiums. The final edition of the "Football Pink" was dated 12 August 2000.

=== MEN Lite ===
In March 2005 the paper launched a cut-down afternoon version of the paper titled MEN Lite, which was distributed free to commuters within Manchester's city centre.

=== Part-free ===
On 2 May 2006 the Evening News dropped the "Lite" edition in favour of a "part-free, part-paid" distribution model for the main paper. Copies were free in Manchester city centre, while readers outside that area continued to pay for the paper.

In December 2006, the paper also began free distribution at Manchester Airport and hospitals throughout Greater Manchester.

In December 2009, the newspaper announced that as of January 2010 the paper would no longer be handed out free Monday to Wednesday in the city centre and other selected locations. Instead they would be handed out free as previously on Thursdays and Fridays, but would regain their paid-for status in these locations at all other times.

=== Manchester Weekly News ===
A free weekly version of the Manchester Evening News, the Manchester Weekly News, was launched 2 April 2015. The paper is delivered to over 265,000 homes in Greater Manchester.

=== City Life affiliation ===
City Life, originally an independent political and cultural magazine for the Manchester area, was acquired by GMG in 1989. In December 2007, City Life ceased independent publication, subsequently becoming a 20-page supplement to the Friday issue of the Manchester Evening News.

== Former journalists ==
- George Orwell (1903–1950), author of Animal Farm (1945), and Nineteen Eighty-Four (1949).
- Harold Evans (1928–2020), later editor of The Sunday Times.
- Danny Brocklehurst (born 1971), screenwriter and playwright

== See also ==
- Manchester Metro News – weekly sister paper
- Murder of Lisa Hession – local case that has received considerable coverage by the paper as it was the current chief reporter's first murder case
