= Emily Wilson (journalist) =

British magazine editor (born 1970)

- Born: 1970 (age 55–56)
- Education: University of Bristol; University of Cardiff

Emily Wilson (born 1970) is a former editor of New Scientist magazine. Appointed in early 2018, she was the first woman to become editor in the publication's 62-year history. Wilson was previously assistant editor of The Guardian newspaper and editor of Guardian Australia. She left her post at New Scientist to write full time in 2024.

== Education ==
Wilson graduated from the University of Bristol in 1991 with a first-class degree in chemistry. Afterwards, she was an English teacher in Malawi for a short time before taking a postgraduate diploma in journalism at the University of Cardiff.

== Career ==
Emily Wilson worked as a reporter at the Bristol Evening Post, then worked for the Daily Mirror and the Daily Mail. In 1999, Wilson joined The Guardian as a health editor. She became assistant features editor in 2001. Between 2012 and 2014, she was responsible for all the UK digital content and editor of the UK homepage. In 2014, Wilson was appointed editor of Guardian Australia. As assistant editor at The Guardian, Wilson was responsible for the coverage of global stories, including science, environment, health and technology.

At the beginning of February 2018, it was announced Wilson had been appointed as the 11th editor of New Scientist magazine and the first woman in this post.

In 2019, Wilson was a judge for the Voyager Media Awards in New Zealand.

== Books ==
=== The Sumerians ===
1. Inanna (2023), Titan Books, novel
2. Gilgamesh (2024), Titan Books, novel
3. Ninshubar (2025), Titan Books, novel

She is now working on a new science fiction novel, due out 2026.
