= Guardian US =

US version of The Guardian

- Website type: Online newspaper
- Available in: English
- Owner: Guardian Media Group
- Creator: The Guardian
- Revenue: Unknown
- Website: theguardian.com/us
- Commercial: Yes
- Registration: Mostly no
- Launched: 2011; 15 years ago
- Current status: Active

Guardian US is the Manhattan-based American online presence of the British print newspaper The Guardian. It launched in September 2011, led by editor-in-chief Janine Gibson, and followed the earlier Guardian America service, which was closed in 2009. Guardian US is only available online. John Mulholland was appointed in January 2018 as the editor of Guardian US. Mulholland left his post at Guardian US in 2022 and was succeeded by Betsy Reed.

== Guardian America ==
Guardian America was created in October 2007 and was highly publicized at the time of its launch on the Guardian Unlimited website. The response from Guardian Unlimited users at the time of Guardian America's creation was mixed, reflecting concern about possible changes.

On July 23, 2008 the Guardian Media Group announced that Caroline Little, the former chief executive and publisher of Washington Post and Newsweek Interactive, would join the Guardian News & Media America operation in the role of special adviser for its expansion in the United States. She also joined the board of ContentNext, the USA-based digital business news publisher that owns PaidContent.org, acquired by GNM earlier in that month. Until May 2011, the editor of Guardian America was Michael Tomasky.

The Guardian US won the American Pulitzer Prize for Public Service in 2014.

== Political stance ==
Guardian News and Media's publications/websites, including the UK parent version and Guardian US, have a broadly socially liberal political stance. The publication has also criticized their parent for publishing opinions "...that we believe promoted transphobic viewpoints, including some of the same assertions about gender that US politicians are citing in their push to eliminate trans rights."

== Ownership ==
Guardian US is controlled by Guardian News and Media (GNM). GNM is controlled by Guardian Media Group (GMG), which is controlled by the Scott Trust Limited, a company which aims to ensure the editorial independence of GMG's publications and websites.
