= Ian Gibson (businessman) =

Businessman (born 1947)

- Born: 1947 (age 78–79)
- Education: Businessman
- Spouse: Jane

Sir Ian Gibson CBE (born 1 February 1947) is a businessman who has chaired or been on the board of a number of Britain's largest companies. His previous chairmanships include British Plaster Board, Wm Morrison Supermarkets, Trinity Mirror, the owner of the Daily Mirror and other regional publications, and Deputy Chairman of ASDA plc. Gibson has also held Non-Executive Directorships at Greggs plc., GKN plc., ASDA plc. and Northern Rock plc.

Gibson's initial career was in the car industry, spending 15 years at the Ford Motor Company working in industrial relations and manufacturing management as General Operations Manager and in the UK, Germany and Spain. Then he spent 18 years with the Nissan Motor Company Ltd where he was Chief Executive in the UK and Europe and was on the Japanese Main Board. He is also a Member of Court at the Bank of England.

Gibson was made a CBE in 1990, and knighted in 1999. He currently (2014) lives in York with his wife Jane and has three children from his former marriages, one of whom is Janine Gibson, the assistant editor of the Financial Times.
