= Madeleine Chapman =

New Zealand journalist, sportsperson (born 1994)

- Chapman in 2023
- Born: 16 March 1994 (age 32); Wellington, New Zealand
- Occupations: Editor, author, journalist, cricketer, javelin thrower
- Organisation(s): The Spinoff, North & South
- Sports career
- Event: Javelin throw

Sports achievements and titles
- National finals: Javelin champion (2013, 2017)
- Personal best: 50.98 m (2017)
- Cricket career

Cricket information
- Batting: Right-handed
- Bowling: Right-arm medium
- Role: Batter

International information
- National side: Samoa (2012–2014)

Domestic team information
- Years: Team
- 2010/11–2012/13: Wellington Blaze

Madeleine Elsie Chapman (born 16 March 1994) is a New Zealand editor, journalist and author. She is the former editor of The Spinoff and North & South and co-wrote the autobiography of New Zealand professional basketball player Steven Adams and a biography of the former Prime Minister of New Zealand, Jacinda Ardern.

Chapman is a former athlete, competing as a member of the Samoa women's national cricket team and as a New Zealand domestic champion javelin thrower.

== Biography ==
=== Early life ===
Chapman grew up in the Wellington Region. Her father was born and raised in Lincoln, Nebraska, while her mother grew up on Upolu in Samoa. Chapman has Tuvaluan heritage through her maternal grandfather, and Chinese heritage through her great-grandfather. Chapman has nine siblings, and was an avid reader as a child.

Chapman received a scholarship to attend Samuel Marsden Collegiate School in Wellington, where she competed in basketball, athletics and cricket events. In 2011 she won the Norwood Award for Outstanding Girls Under 20 player of the year, and was also named the College Sport Wellington women's Cricket Player of the Year.

=== Sporting career ===
From 2010 to 2013, Chapman played cricket professionally for the Wellington Blaze. In 2012, Chapman joined the Samoa women's national cricket team, playing seven rounds in the 2012 Pepsi ICC East Asia Pacific Women's Trophy and topping the batting leader board for the competition. Chapman continued to compete for Samoa until 2014.

Representing Auckland-based North Harbour Bays Athletics, Chapman first competed in New Zealand athletics competitions as a javelin thrower in 2013. She attended the New Zealand Athletics Championships in 2013, winning two gold medals for the javelin throw. In 2014, Chapman quit athletics due to an injury.

Chapman returned to athletics competitions in late 2016 and 2017. At the Porritt Classic in 2017, Chapman was the champion women's javelin thrower (49.18 m). At the 2017 New Zealand national championships, Chapman won a gold medal with a career-best javelin throw of 50.98 metres, outcompeting national champion Tori Peeters at the competition. As of 2022, this ranks Chapman fourth in the list of record holders for New Zealand Women's javelin throw.

=== Media career ===
Chapman received a scholarship to attend the University of Auckland, where she studied education. While at university, Chapman wrote as a film critic for Craccum, the Auckland University Students' Association magazine.

In 2016, Chapman became a staff writer for online magazine The Spinoff, beginning as an intern. In the same year, Chapman was asked to ghostwrite New Zealand professional basketball player Steven Adams' autobiography, which was published in 2018. Chapman had known Adams since childhood, as both had played in Wellington regional high school basketball competitions.

While at The Spinoff, Chapman appeared on Three infotainment television programme The Spinoff TV (2018), and has written and directed Scratched: Aotearoa's Lost Sporting Legends (2019 onwards), an NZ On Air-funded documentary webseries. In 2018, Chapman won the Young Business Journalist of the Year award at the New Zealand Shareholders' Association's 2018 Business Journalism Awards, and the best opinion writer (humour/satire) award at the 2019 Voyager Media Awards. Some of Chapman's best-known works include pieces on housing unaffordability, sleep inertia aiding lamps, and ranking lists of snack foods such as biscuits and lollies. Her 2018 article exposing false country of origin practices by Denise L'Estrange-Corbet's fashion label World won the award for best (single) news story / scoop at the 2019 Voyager Media Awards.

Chapman left The Spinoff as a writer in early 2020, taking a break from journalism. During the same year, Chapman released A New Kind of Leader, a biography of New Zealand Prime Minister Jacinda Ardern she was commissioned to write in 2019. When print magazine North & South was relaunched in late 2020, Chapman became the publication's senior editor. In late 2021, Chapman became the co-editor of The Spinoff, alongside long time Spinoff staff writer Alex Casey. She stepped down as editor in late 2025, and was replaced by Veronica Schmidt.

== Bibliography ==
- Adams, Steven; Chapman, Madeleine (2018). My Life, My Fight. Auckland: Penguin. ISBN 9781525285318. OCLC 1057771816.
- Chapman, Madeleine (2020). Jacinda Ardern: A New Kind of Leader. Black Inc. ISBN 9781760641818. OCLC 1222806027.

== Achievements ==
=== Javelin throw ===
Year	Competition	Venue	Position	Notes
2013	New Zealand Athletics Championships - Senior Women	Auckland, New Zealand	1st	47.63 m
2013	New Zealand Athletics Championships – Women Under 20	Auckland, New Zealand	1st	45.89 m
2017	New Zealand Athletics Championships – Open Women	Hamilton, New Zealand	1st	50.98 m
