= Andrew Miller (executive) =

British business executive (born 1966)

Andrew Arthur Miller (born 10 July 1966) is a British accountant and business executive. He was the chief executive officer of the Guardian Media Group from 2010 to 2015. He previously served as Chief Financial Officer of the Trader Media Group from 2004 to 2009, and of the Guardian Media Group from 2009 to 2010.

Business positions
Preceded by Carolyn McCall	CEO of the Guardian Media Group; 2010 to 2015	Succeeded by David Pemsel
