= Katharine Viner =

British journalist and playwright (born 1971)

- Born: Katharine Sophie Viner; January 4, 1971 (age 55); Yorkshire, England
- Education: Pembroke College, Oxford (BA)
- Occupations: Journalist, playwright
- Title: Editor-in-chief of The Guardian
- Term: 2015–present
- Predecessor: Alan Rusbridger
- Spouse: Adrian Chiles (m. 2022)
- Website: theguardian.com/profile/katharineviner

Katharine Sophie Viner (born January 1971) is a British journalist and playwright. She became the second state-educated and first female editor-in-chief at The Guardian on 1 June 2015, succeeding Alan Rusbridger. Viner previously headed The Guardian's web operations in Australia and the United States, before being selected for the editor-in-chief's position.

== Early life and education ==
Viner was raised in Yorkshire, the daughter of teachers and she attended Ripon Grammar School where she became headgirl. Her grandfather, Vic Viner, was an able seaman involved in the Dunkirk evacuation. As a teenager, she joined the Campaign for Nuclear Disarmament (CND) and the Anti-Apartheid Movement, the nearest groups were 25 miles away, and read Spare Rib. Her first newspaper article, published in The Guardian in 1987 while she was still in school, was on the ending of the O-level examinations, which were being replaced in the UK by the General Certificate of Secondary Education (GCSE). "Cramming five years of knowledge into two and a half hours does not seem to be a fair system", she wrote. Around 1988, Viner had a period of work experience at the Ripon Gazette, her local newspaper.

After A-levels Viner studied English at Pembroke College, Oxford. Just before her finals, Viner won a competition organised by The Guardian's women's page and was advised by Louise Chunn, then Guardian women's editor, to pursue a career in journalism. "I honestly thought journalism wasn't for me, I thought it was for men in suits in London", she remembered in 2005. During her 20s, Viner spent most of her holidays in the Middle East, a region in which she has a particular interest, spending time in Lebanon, Syria, Israel, West Bank and other locations.

== Career ==
For work experience, Viner joined Cosmopolitan, a women's monthly magazine. The magazine retained her afterwards and she became features assistant, then news and careers editor; earlier, she had won another student competition involving a submission to the magazine. After three years at The Sunday Times, working as a commissioning editor and writer for its magazine, Viner joined The Guardian in 1997. Following a period on the staff of the women's page, she became editor of the Saturday Weekend supplement in 1998. She became features editor in 2006 and deputy editor in 2008 at the same time as Ian Katz. Viner edited the Saturday edition of The Guardian from 2008 to 2012.

Laura Slattery in The Irish Times, reviewing Viner's career up to March 2015, noted that she "has almost always been the person who does the commissioning, [rather than] provided the byline". Several Guardian pieces by Viner published during this period are reprinted in an anthology drawn from the Guardian archive entitled Women of the Revolution: Forty Years of Feminism (2010), edited by Kira Cochrane.

=== Australia and New York ===
In January 2013, Viner's relocation to Sydney to supervise a new Guardian digital edition in Australia was announced; this venture was launched in May 2013.

Viner delivered the A. N. Smith Lecture in Journalism at the University of Melbourne in October 2013. D. D. Guttenplan, London correspondent of the American Nation magazine, wrote in March 2015 that "there is no one on either side of the Atlantic Ocean who has thought as deeply as Viner about the relationship between readers, technology and the future of journalism". Guttenplan was not totally convinced by Viner's "eagerness to transcend print" in the move to digital media, but commenting about her 2013 speech in Australia, he wrote that "her arguments for the importance of reader engagement, and for sustained, original reporting of information that someone, somewhere, wants to keep secret are compelling and convincing".

In the summer of 2014, Viner moved to New York City and became the new head of The Guardian's American website in succession to Janine Gibson while remaining deputy editor of Guardian News & Media. While based in New York, Viner expanded Guardian US's coverage from a limited range of subjects, into areas such as the arts and sport; she also increased US staffing.

=== Editor-in-chief of The Guardian ===
In March 2015, Viner won a majority in the ballot of Guardian and Observer editorial staff as the favoured successor of Alan Rusbridger as The Guardian's editor-in-chief. Viner received 53% of first-choice votes from the 964 staff who participated, and was thus shortlisted for selection. Former deputy editor and rival, Ian Katz (editor of the BBC's Newsnight television programme 2013–2017), was also on the final shortlist of two.

Viner was appointed editor-in-chief on 20 March 2015, the first woman to be the editor of The Guardian in its 194-year history, and assumed her new post on 1 June 2015. She announced her intention to make the "media organisation" a "home for the most ambitious journalism, ideas and events", which is able to reach "out to readers all around the world".

In a column at USA Today, author and former Guardian columnist Michael Wolff suggested that another of Viner's rivals to succeed Rusbridger, Janine Gibson, suffered because of internal disquiet over the internal impact on The Guardian of the Edward Snowden revelations which Gibson edited in New York. Wolff said Gibson aligned herself with Snowden, promising more of the same, while Viner "pitched decidedly against Gibson and, in a sense, against Snowden". Peter Wilby, writing in the New Statesman, preferred a different explanation: "Viner is a more charming, more inclusive and less threatening figure than Janine Gibson, who started as the bookies' and Rusbridger's favourite."

=== Later developments ===
In March 2016, Viner and Guardian News and Media chief executive David Pemsel announced cost-cutting measures, leading to the projected loss of 250 jobs, to reduce unsustainable losses in order to break even within three years. The following month, The Times reported internal tensions within the organisation as Rusbridger prepared to become Chairman of the Scott Trust, the ultimate overseer to ensure The Guardian survives "in perpetuity". Rusbridger's expansion of the company's operations was reportedly seen by staff as responsible for the decisions which Viner and Pemsel have made. Viner and David Pemsel successfully opposed Rusbridger becoming Chair of the Scott Trust Ltd and he dropped plans to take up the post.

Appeals to readers for donations have been successful. "We now get about the same amount of money from membership and paying readers as we do from advertising", Viner told the Financial Times in May 2017. By the time The Guardian and sister title The Observer relaunched as a tabloid in January 2018, part of the cost-cutting exercise, revenue from readers exceeded advertising and the group expects to break even in 2018/19, for the first time since the 1980s, rather than continue to sustain heavy losses. As of 2018 this approach was considered successful, having brought more than 1 million subscriptions or donations, with the paper hoping to break even by April 2019. Industry specialists consulted by the Financial Times have continued to doubt whether the donation and membership model is financially viable in the long term.

In May 2021 The Daily Telegraph reported that there was serious conflict between Viner and chief executive of The Guardian Media Group Annette Thomas about finances and the direction the newspaper should take. The previous year The Guardian announced 180 job cuts. Thomas had earlier said at a media industry conference "we have quality content in spades ... the job at hand is to now go further by strengthening the growing elements of our business". Viner wanted renewed investment after better than feared financial results in 2020. On 9 June 2021, it was announced that Thomas would leave The Guardian Media Group at the end of the month.

In 2023, the New Statesman named her thirtieth most powerful left wing figure in the UK in their annual 'Left Power List'.

=== Work outside journalism ===
Viner is known for My Name Is Rachel Corrie, a play she co-edited with actor Alan Rickman from the writings and emails of Rachel Corrie, an American activist who was killed by a bulldozer operated by the Israeli Army in Rafah, Gaza in 2003. The play was first performed at the Royal Court Theatre in 2005. After Rickman died of cancer in January 2016, Viner wrote that their collaboration had been initially difficult, but "on the opening night we each admitted that we couldn't have done justice to Rachel's words without the other".

Viner was a judge in the Orange Prize for Fiction in 2004 and was on the board of the Royal Court Theatre for 13 years.

=== Political positions ===
In 2002, Viner criticised the planned invasion of Iraq and wrote that George W. Bush "bombed Afghanistan to liberate the women from their burkas (or, as he would have it, to free the "women of cover"), and sent out his wife Laura to tell how Afghans are tortured for wearing nail varnish".

Viner opposed Brexit. In 2016, she wrote: "At the end of a campaign that dominated the news for months, it was suddenly obvious that the winning side had no plan for how or when the UK would leave the EU – while the deceptive claims that carried the leave campaign to victory suddenly crumbled."

== Personal life ==
Viner married broadcaster, documentary maker and writer Adrian Chiles in 2022. Chiles, speaking on BBC Radio 4's Saturday Live, said 150 guests attended their wedding ceremony.

Media offices
Preceded by Alan Rusbridger	Editor of The Guardian; 2015–present	Incumbent
