= European Watch Company =

American luxury watch retailer founded 1993 in Boston, MA

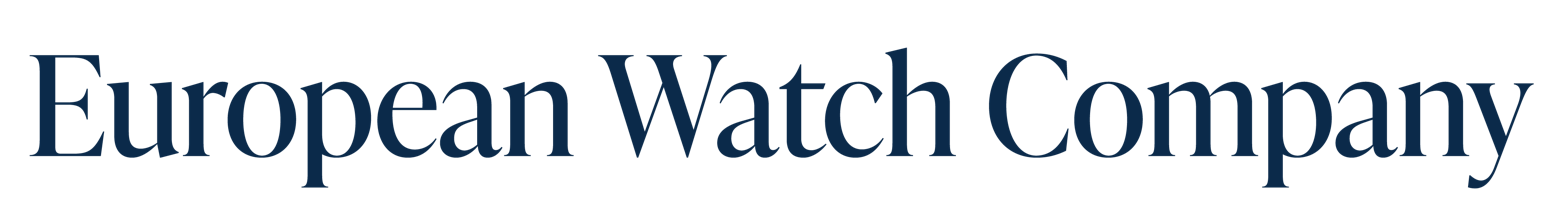
- Founded: 1993 in Boston, Massachusetts
- Headquarters: Boston, Massachusetts
- Founder: Albert Ganjei
- Industry: Retail
- Products: Luxury watches
- Website: europeanwatch.com

European Watch Company (EWC) is an American luxury watch retailer based in Boston, Massachusetts.

== History ==
The European Watch Company was founded on Newbury Street in Boston in 1993 by Albert Ganjei.

EWC sells classic and contemporary timepieces, including rare vintage models and limited editions from brands such as Patek Philippe, Rolex, Audemars Piguet, F.P. Journe, and Vacheron Constantin. Popular among watch collectors, EWC initially sold affordable watches.

In 2018, Joshua Ganjei succeeded Albert Ganjei as the chief executive officer of the company. Albert Ganjei remained the president of the company. In 2021, EWC's office and salesroom were relocated to the intersection of Clarendon and Dartmouth streets in Boston's Back Bay neighborhood.

In 2024, EWC wrote an anthology titled The Connoisseur's Guide to Fine Timepieces, which was published by Assouline, highlighting the notable watches collected and sold by the company over its history.

In October 2024, EWC acquired the digital assets of Crown & Caliber from Hodinkee.
