= Janine Gibson (journalist) =

British journalist

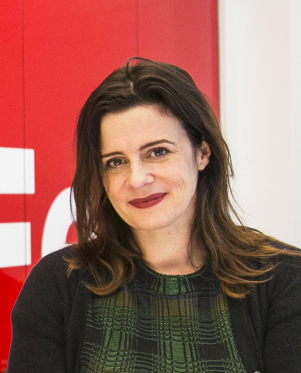
- Gibson in 2017
- Born: Janine Victoria Gibson; Germany
- Education: St John's College, Oxford
- Occupation: Journalist
- Notable credit(s): Editor-in-Chief BuzzFeed UK; Editor-in-Chief Guardian US
- Father: Ian Gibson

Janine Victoria Gibson is a British journalist who was appointed editor of the Weekend FT in 2023. Previously she was assistant editor of the Financial Times since May 2019. Before then, in the summer of 2014, she became deputy editor of Guardian News and Media and editor-in-chief of theguardian.com website in London. She was the editor-in-chief in New York City of Guardian US, the offshoot of The Guardian that won the Pulitzer Prize for Public Service in 2014. After leaving The Guardian, Gibson was editor-in-chief of the BuzzFeed UK website until she stepped down in January 2019 as the publication announced financial difficulties.

== Early life ==
The daughter of British parents, Gibson was born in Germany. Her father, the industrialist Sir Ian Gibson, was then an employee of the motor-car manufacturer Ford of Europe, and her mother a teacher. Gibson read English Literature at St John's College, Oxford.

== Career ==
Gibson began her career in the media trade press, becoming deputy editor of Televisual (1995–97) and subsequently international editor of Broadcast magazine during 1997 to 1998. She then briefly joined The Independent newspaper as a media correspondent for a few months, before taking up a similar post later in 1998 at The Guardian.

=== The Guardian ===
At The Guardian, Gibson was responsible for launching The Guardian's media website and became Media Guardian editor. In May 2003, it was announced that she in addition had been appointed editor of the Media, Society, Education and Technology G3 supplements, a newly created post.

Her appointment as editor of the guardian.co.uk website was announced in November 2008. Her immediate superiors at this time were Emily Bell, then director of digital content, and Guardian editor-in-chief Alan Rusbridger. After Bell took up an academic post in New York in April 2010, Gibson's responsibilities were expanded to include supervising all of Guardian News & Media's digital output.

=== Guardian's American website ===
After several months of discussion with Alan Rusbridger in early 2011, Gibson was formally appointed the editor of The Guardian's new American online operations, to be based in New York, in April. The newspaper's new US website was launched in September; an earlier attempt by the newspaper to relate to an American online audience, headed by Michael Tomasky in Washington DC between 2007 and 2009, had proved unsuccessful.

Glenn Greenwald brought the leaked material from Edward Snowden to Gibson's attention, and she formed the team who met Snowden in Hong Kong to analyse the material he had accumulated.

Gibson continued to be Greenwald's supervising editor during the time he was associated with The Guardian and editing Guardian US's Pulitzer Prize winning coverage of Snowdon's revelations about NSA surveillance. She is reported to have told Alan Rusbridger when informing him of the scoops Greenwald, their newspaper's columnist, had uncovered: "I’ve got a little story to chat to you about".

After returning to London, Gibson became chief of theguardian.com website during Summer 2014 becoming in addition a deputy editor of Guardian News & Media. Her place as head of The Guardian's American operations was taken by Katharine Viner.

Gibson was offered a managing editor of digital media position with The New York Times in early May 2014, but turned it down. According to one report in The New Yorker, internal politics related to her potential hiring led to the dismissal of that paper's executive editor, Jill Abramson a few weeks later. Gibson was perceived to be the most likely successor to Alan Rusbridger, who resigned as editor-in-chief in December 2014, but Katharine Viner was ultimately appointed in March 2015.

In May 2015, Gibson left The Guardian.

=== BuzzFeed UK ===
In September 2015, prior to an expansion of its activities, she was appointed as editor-in-chief of the BuzzFeed UK website.

Under Gibson's editorship, the website moved into more hard news and published an investigative series in which 14 suspicious UK deaths (and one in the US) were found to have links to the Kremlin. The series triggered Theresa May's government to commit to a full review, was a Pulitzer Prize finalist and George Clooney has picked it up for a film. In early 2018, the website also published a previously unseen Brexit analysis which stated the UK would be worse off in every scenario.

BuzzFeed UK won News Website of the Year in 2017 at the Press Awards.

FT Weekend won the London Press Club Newspaper of the Year in 2023 and the Newspaper Awards Weekend Newspaper of the Year.
