= A. P. Wadsworth =

British journalist, author, and editor of The Guardian (1890–1956)

Alfred Powell Wadsworth (26 August 1891 – 4 November 1956) was a British journalist, author, and editor of The Guardian from 1944 until his death in 1956.

Wadsworth became editor in 1944, when he succeeded William Percival Crozier.

Wadsworth died on 4 November 1956, aged 65.

Media offices
Preceded by William Percival Crozier	Editor of The Guardian; 1944–1956	Succeeded by Alastair Hetherington
