= Gigaom =

Technology news website

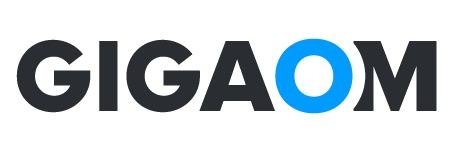
- Website type: Technology news and analysis
- Available in: English
- Headquarters: Englewood, Colorado, US
- Owner: Knowingly Corporation
- Commercial: Yes
- Launched: 2006; 20 years ago

Gigaom is a technology-focused analyst firm and media company. It was founded by Om Malik in San Francisco, California. In March 2015, it was shut down and in June 2015, its website and content were acquired by Knowingly and relaunched.

== History ==
- In 2006, Om Malik founded the company after operating a personal blog.
- In June 2006, Malik left his day job at Business 2.0 to work on Gigaom full-time.
- In April 2007, the company launched a blog focused on growing a startup.
- In July 2008, the company acquired jkOnTheRun, a mobile-focused blog.
- In 2008, Paul Walborsky was named CEO of the company. Walborsky resigned in September 2014.
- In October 2008, the company raised $4.5 million.
- In October 2010, the company raised $2.5 million.
- In May 2011, the company raised $6 million at a $40 million valuation, in a financing round led by RELX.
- On February 8, 2012, Gigaom acquired PaidContent.
- On March 9, 2015, Gigaom ceased operations due to financial difficulties. At the time, it had 6.4 million monthly readers.
- In June 2015, Gigaom was acquired by Knowingly Corp., and was relaunched August 2015. Gigaom's technology conferences were relaunched under a new company.
- In June 2020, co-founder Ben Book was appointed CEO.

== See also ==
- Gartner
