= Benjamin Clymer =

American watch expert and entrepreneur

Benjamin "Ben" Clymer
- Born: 1982 (age 43–44)
- Education: Syracuse University (BS); Columbia University (MS)
- Occupation: Executive chairman of Hodinkee
- Known for: Founder of Hodinkee, watch expert and entrepreneur

Benjamin "Ben" Clymer (born 1982) is an American businessman known as the executive chairman and founder of Hodinkee, a luxury watch and lifestyle website. He is an influencer in the world of watches.

== Education and early life ==
Clymer was born in 1982, and grew up in Brighton, New York, a suburb of Rochester. As a youth, he was an avid collector, and first became interested in mechanical watches when his grandfather gave him an Omega Speedmaster MK40.

Clymer graduated from Brighton High School in 2001. He earned his bachelor's degree at Syracuse University and his master's degree at Columbia University School of Journalism.

== Career ==
After graduating college, Clymer worked as a project manager at Swiss investment bank UBS. During the 2008 financial crisis, Clymer took a severance package from UBS and enrolled in Columbia University Graduate School of Journalism to earn a master's degree. While at Columbia, also in 2008, he founded Hodinkee as a fan site and blog for watch aficionados. In 2012, Clymer launched Hodinkee's e-commerce platform based on Shopify, and in 2013, Time named Hodinkee one of the 50 best websites in the world.

In December 2013, The New York Times dubbed Clymer "The High Priest of Horology", noting his watch and style consulting work with brands including Club Monaco and Gilt Groupe.

By 2015, Hodinkee was known as the most respected influential online resource in the traditional watch industry.

In 2018, at age 35, Clymer was named to Crain's New York Business's 40 Under 40 list. In December 2018, Clymer led the collaboration efforts on the Slim d’Hermès Limited Editions with French luxury goods company Hermes' creative director Pierre-Alexis Dumas.

In September 2020, Clymer was named to Fortune's 40 under 40 list, in the category of Media and Entertainment.

== Personal life ==
Clymer is a collector of watches and cars, and his collection has been featured in GQ and The Wall Street Journal. Through their shared passion for watches, Clymer has struck up friendships with other well known watch collectors such as musician John Mayer and actor and comedian Aziz Ansari. Clymer's vintage Porsche 356 Zagato Coupe was featured in The Wall Street Journal He is also the owner of an unrestored 1967 Porsche 911S. Clymer is married to Cara Barret, who used to work at Hodinkee, and they live near Pound Ridge in rural New York state.
