= Hodinkee =

American watch website

Hodinkee Inc.
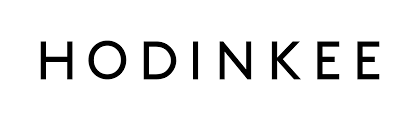
- Company type: Private company
- Available in: English, Japanese
- Founded: 2008 (incorporated 2008)
- Headquarters: New York, New York
- Founder: Benjamin Clymer
- Industry: Watches
- Products: Content about watches and accessories; watch sales and insurance; brand partnerships
- Services: Blog and e-commerce site
- Employees: 88 (2019)
- Subsidiaries: HODINKEE Japan
- Website: www.hodinkee.com; www.hodinkee.jp
- Current status: Active

Hodinkee, stylized as HODINKEE, is a New York City–based watch website, known as an influential editorial and e-commerce site for new and vintage wristwatches. Founded in 2008, the name comes from the Czech and Slovak word for wristwatch, hodinky. In 2024, global watch retailer Watches of Switzerland purchased Hodinkee for an undisclosed sum.

== History ==
Benjamin Clymer started the watch website Hodinkee in 2008. He credited his lifelong passion for watches to his grandfather's Omega Speedmaster that he loved and his grandfather let him wear. Clymer used Google Translate to find the most whimsical translation of 'wristwatch' to deal with perceived pretension in the watch industry, and settled on a variation of the Czech and Slovak word for watch, hodinky.

In July 2015, a news aggregation app focused on wristwatches called Watchville merged with Hodinkee, and its internet entrepreneur founder Kevin Rose became the chief executive of Hodinkee. In April 2017, Rose stepped down from his role as the CEO of Hodinkee to become a partner in a start-up venture firm, True Ventures.

In January 2018, the company launched Hodinkee Shop, an ecommerce site selling watches. That year, the company also expanded to include pop-up stores, with a total staff of 25.

In 2019, technology business magazine Fast Company named Hodinkee as one of its most innovative companies in the media sector.

In November 2019, Hodinkee Japan was launched in partnership with Hearst Fujin Gahō, as a Japanese language version of the website.

In December 2020, Toby Bateman, the former managing director of fashion company Mr Porter, joined the company as its new CEO, and Clymer became Executive Chairman. The company also raised $40M in a series B round, with American investment advisory firm TCG as lead investor, and other investors including French luxury giant LVMH's LVMH Luxury Ventures subsidiary, True Ventures, Grammy Award–winning musician John Mayer and six-time Super Bowl champion Tom Brady.

In February 2021, Hodinkee announced it had acquired pre-owned luxury watch specialists Crown & Caliber. The watch market faced a downturn starting in early 2022, caused in part by the war in Ukraine and collapse of the crypto industry. By April 2024, there had been multiple rounds of layoffs, including a cut of almost 20 percent of its staff around September 2023. In December 2021, Bateman stepped down as CEO.

In October 2024, Hodinkee announced it had been acquired by Watches of Switzerland, a British-based watch retailer with more than 220 stores in the U.S. and U.K. As part of the deal, Clymer returned to active management as president, saying Hodinkee would refocus on content and move its e-commerce business into Watches of Switzerland. The company also announced that it had sold the Crown & Caliber brand to European Watch Company and that staff levels, at 88 as of 2019, were now around 35.

== Business model ==
Hodinkee operates the Hodinkee.com website, providing editorial content related to watches, and Hodinkee shop, an ecommerce platform for watch enthusiasts and collectors interested in new and used luxury watches. The company sells Hodinkee-branded accessories, and also hosts pop-up events, with the goal of being a one stop online and offline shop for anyone with an interest in watches. The company sells advertising on its site, and also collaborates with luxury Swiss watchmakers to design collectible versions of their watches which are offered for sale on the Hodinkee website. Because Hodinkee partners with brands that it both reviews and advertises for sale, and because it is financed partly by the largest luxury brand owner in the world, some industry writers have suggested that the company's editorial integrity could be compromised.

Hodinkee has a large social media presence to both showcase watches and sell them. Its Instagram page has more 670,000 followers and its YouTube Page is viewed by over 80,000 people a day. On its YouTube page, Hodinkee not only examines individual watches, but also highlights the collections of prominent watch collectors.

== Collaborations ==
Hodinkee collaborates with luxury brands to create collectible watches and related accessories.

In 2013, Hodinkee partnered with Swiss luxury watchmaker ochs und junior to produce two Junior Moonphase watches to celebrate their fifth birthday. Fashion designer Todd Snyder partners with Hodinkee for its vintage watches collection.

In 2015, the company partnered with Swiss watchmaker MB&F to build a ten-piece variant of the watchmaker's Legacy Machine 101. Hermès partnered with Hodinkee to create two limited edition Slim d'Hermès watches in a special shade of “Hodinkee blue.”

In 2018, the company collaborated with Swiss luxury watchmaker Omega SA for the Omega Speedmaster Hodinkee 10th Anniversary limited edition. The Swatch Sistem51 Blue Edition for Hodinkee is a Swiss Made mechanical watch, powered by Swatch's Sistem51 automatic movement, the first mechanical movement assembled entirely by machine which has the most affordable Hodinkee Limited Edition. Also in 2018, the company collaborated with TAG Heuer on the Autavia Calibre Heuer 02 and Carrera Skipper.

In 2019, Hodinkee partnered with IWC on a ceramic/titanium pilot watch limited to a production of 500 units. Also in 2019, the company partnered with German camera company Leica on the Leica M10-P "Ghost Edition" camera. For this limited edition, the top and bottom plates were coated in a matte gray paint, the engravings were filled in white, the traditional black leather was replaced with gray cowhide leather and it was missing Leica's red dot logo. The camera's design and choice of materials was inspired by a vintage Rolex Submariner belonging to Hodinkee CEO Benjamin Clymer. In December 2019, Hodinkee also collaborated with Seiko to reissue its Alpinist, replacing the green dial and brass indices with a blue dial and silver indices.

In December 2020, Hodinkee collaborated with Japanese electronics company Casio and John Mayer on the G-SHOCK Ref: 6900 by John Mayer. The watch was inspired by Mayer’s Casiotone SK-5 sampling keyboard he played growing up in Fairfield, CT in the 1980s.

== Sponsorship ==
The company is a sponsor of the Horological Society of New York.
