= PaidContent =

Defunct online news magazine

paidContent
- Website type: News website
- Available in: English
- Owner: GigaOM
- Website: paidcontent.org
- Commercial: Yes
- Launched: 2002; 24 years ago
- Current status: Defunct

paidContent was an online media hub that covered news, information and analysis of the business of digital media. It was founded in 2002 by journalist Rafat Ali to "chronicle the economic evolution of digital content that is shaping the future of the media, information and entertainment industries".

== History ==
Funded by Alan Patricof's Greycroft Partners in 2006, Rafat Ali's umbrella company, ContentNext, formerly had offices in Santa Monica, California, and New York. ContentNext operated paidContent.org, paidContent.org:UK, mocoNews.net, which covered the business of mobile content, and contentSutra.com, which covered India's digital media markets.

In 2008, ContentNext was purchased by Guardian Media Group for a reported $30 million. It became a member of the Guardian Professional Group, though founder/editor Ali and CEO Nathan Richardson, formerly of Yahoo! Finance, continued to run the media website as an independent business.

== Acquisition ==
On February 8, 2012, paidContent was acquired by GigaOM through the acquisition of ContentNext Media. On November 12, 2013, paidContent was merged into GigaOM.
