= Scott Trust Limited =

British multinational mass media company

The Scott Trust Limited is the British limited company that owns Guardian Media Group and thus The Guardian as well as various other media businesses in the UK. It was created as a trust to acquire The Guardian in 1936, and reorganised as a limited company in 2008.

The company is responsible for appointing the editor of The Guardian (and those of the group's other main newspapers) but, apart from enjoining them to continue the paper's editorial policy on "the same lines and in the same spirit as heretofore", it has a policy of not interfering in their decisions. The arrangement tends to give editors a long tenure: for example, the last incumbent, Alan Rusbridger, held the position from 1995 until 2015.

The current chairman of the Scott Trust Board is Ole Jacob Sunde, who replaced Alex Graham in 2021. Others on the eleven-member board include the current editor-in-chief Katharine Viner, Guardian legal affairs correspondent Haroon Siddique who is the journalist director of the board, and one member of the Scott family.

The Scott Trust is a limited partner in GMG Ventures LP, founded in 2017, according to the GMG 2018 annual report, "this £42m venture capital fund is designed to contribute financial returns and to support GMG’s strategy by investing in early stage businesses focused on developing the next generation of media technology".

== History ==
=== 1936–1948 ===
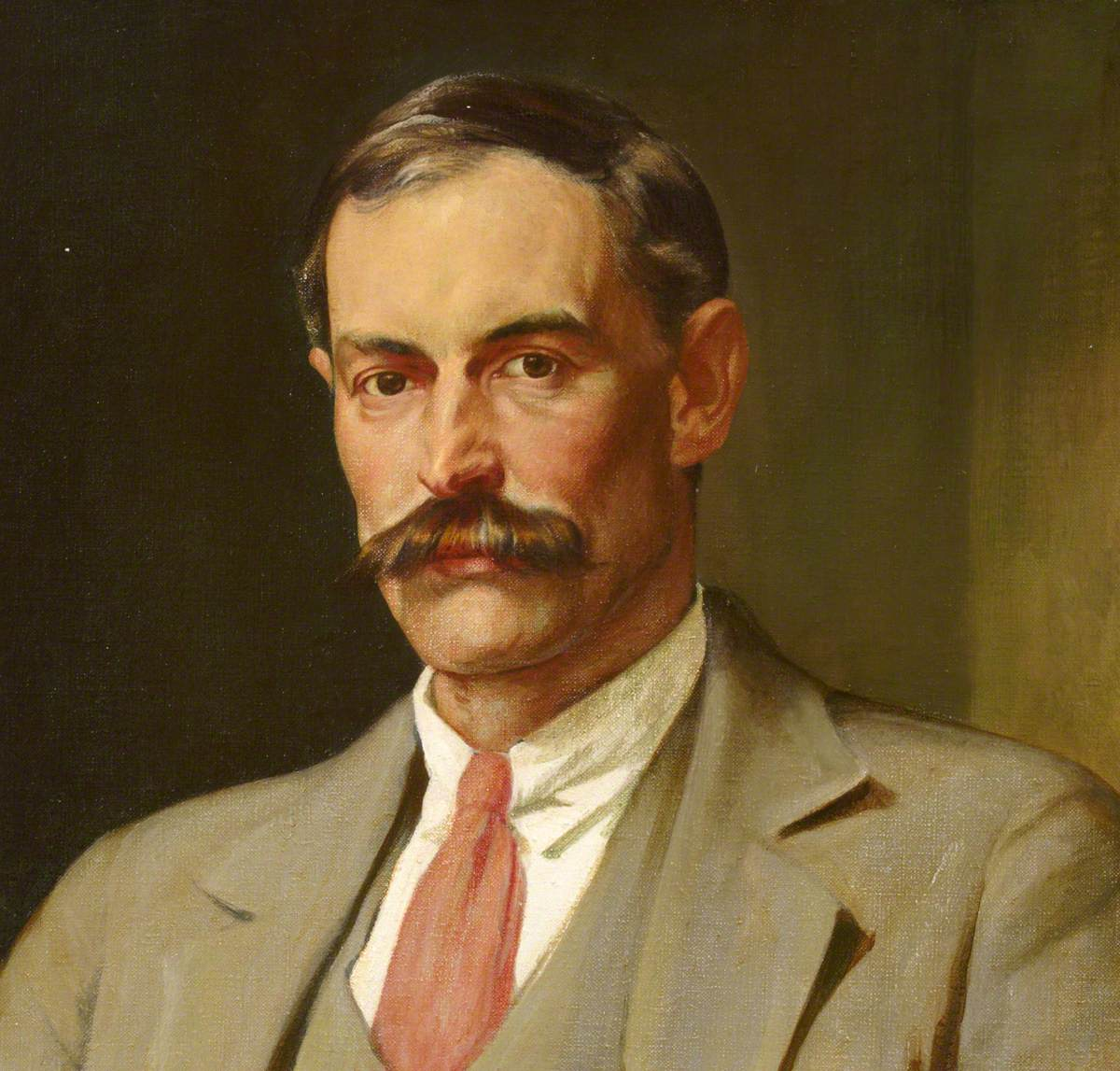
John Russell Scott by Francis Dodd

The Trust was established in 1936 by John Russell Scott, owner of the Manchester Guardian (as it then was) and the Manchester Evening News. After the deaths in quick succession of his father C. P. Scott and brother Edward, and consequent threat of death duties, John Scott wished to prevent future death duties forcing the closure or sale of the newspapers, and to protect the liberal editorial line of the Guardian from interference by future proprietors. The first and only chairman of the first Trust was John Scott.

=== 1948–2008 ===
The Trust was dissolved and reformed in 1948, as it was thought that the Trust, under the terms of the original trust deed, had become liable to tax due to changes in the law. At this time John Scott also gave up his exclusive right to appoint trustees; the trustees would henceforth appoint new members themselves. Five months after the signing of the new trust deed, John Scott died. After three years of legal argument, the Inland Revenue gave up its claim for death duty.

The eight initial trustees of the 1948 Trust were all connected with the Manchester Guardian and Evening News, Ltd., and included four of C. P. Scott's grandsons as well as the then editor of The Guardian, A. P. Wadsworth. It has become normal practice for a Guardian journalist to be a member of the trust, though they are not considered to be a "representative" of the staff, as this may result in a conflict of interests.

In 1992, the Trust identified its central objective:

"To secure the financial and editorial independence of The Guardian in perpetuity: as a quality national newspaper without party affiliation; remaining faithful to its liberal tradition; as a profit-seeking enterprise managed in an efficient and cost-effective manner."

The Trust saw its main functions as being the following:

- "To secure the Trust's own continuity by renewing its membership and by dealing with threats to its existence
- To monitor the organisation, financial management and overall strategy of the Group, holding the Board accountable for its performance
- To appoint and 'in extreme circumstances' to dismiss the editors of The Guardian, the Manchester Evening News (and The Observer after its acquisition in 1993)
- To act as a 'court of appeal' in the event of any dispute between the editorial and managerial sides of the operation."

The second Trust had five Chairmen over its 60 years: Alfred Powell Wadsworth (1948–56), Richard Farquhar Scott (1956–84), Alastair Hetherington (1984–89), Hugo Young (1990–2003) and Liz Forgan (2003–2008).

=== The Scott Trust Limited: 2008–present ===
In October 2008, it was announced that the trust was being wound up and its assets transferred to a new limited company named "The Scott Trust Limited" to strengthen the protection it offers to the Guardian and because [l]ike all non-charitable trusts, and unlike limited companies, the Scott Trust has a finite lifespan. The core purpose of the Trust was enshrined in the constitution of the limited company and "cannot be altered or amended." The new company is barred from paying dividends, and "its constitution has been carefully drafted to ensure that no individual can ever personally benefit from the arrangements."

In February 2010, the company announced the sale of its GMG Regional Media arm and its regional print titles to the Trinity Mirror Group. The regional titles comprised the Manchester Evening News and 31 others in the North West and South of England. The sale was finalised on 28 March 2010 and ended the Scott Trust's association with regional newspapers.

In 2012 the Scott Trust Limited became a co-founder of the European Press Prize.

Guardian News and Media, a subsidiary of the Scott Trust Limited, reported a loss of £30.9 million for the year to the end of April 2013.

The company via the Guardian Media Group (GMG, a subsidiary company) completed the sale for £619 million of its 50.1% stake in Auto Trader on 4 March 2014. Apax Partners, a venture capital firm, increased its share to become the sole shareholder in the business. The £619 million earned from the sale of Auto Trader added to the £253.7 million of cash and investments which GMG published in its 2013 annual report. This left an investment fund which was likely to be in excess of £850 million to underwrite Guardian losses.

In December 2014, it was announced that Alan Rusbridger, then Guardian editor-in-chief, would succeed Forgan as the chairman of the company in 2016 but he unexpectedly announced on 13 May 2016 his resignation as a director.

As of January 2016, the company's funds were £740 million, down from £838.3 million in July 2015.

As of 1 April 2018, the value of the Scott Trust Endowment Fund was £1.01 billion, down slightly from £1.03 billion in 2017.

In 2023, following independent academic research commissioned in 2020 reporting, the trust apologised for the newspaper's founders' involvement in transatlantic slavery principally through the cotton trade. It announced a £10 million ten-year programme of restorative justice.

In November 2024, Jonathan Paine was appointed to the board of the Scott Trust. Paine is a former managing director and senior adviser at Rothschild & Co.

In early December 2024, the company announced the sale of The Observer to Tortoise Media. Two weeks later the company confirmed the deal, and that it had taken a stock position in the purchaser.

== Governance ==
Scott Trust Limited was incorporated on 24 September 2008 as Scott Place 1001 Limited, and adopted its current name on 3 October 2008; its number is 06706464 and it is a company limited by shares. The Scott Trust Limited is governed according to the articles of association, set up in 2008 and filed at Companies House. The articles say that the board of directors must guard editorial independence. The board appoints itself under article 63, through an appointments committee. Neither workers at the newspapers nor readers participate in voting for board members. Such voting could be allowed with 75% approval of the existing board of directors under article 7.

== The Scott Trust Board ==
=== Current members ===
Name	Joined	Position
Ole Jacob Sunde	2015	Chairman of the Scott Trust Limited board (2021–present)
Katharine Viner	June 2015	Editor-in-chief, Guardian News and Media (June 2015 – present)
Tracy Corrigan	2022	
Margaret Simons	2022	
David Olusoga	June 2018	Historian, had also been writing for The Guardian
Russell Scott	2015	Senior Independent Director
Haroon Siddique	2022	Journalist director of the Scott Trust Limited board (2022 – present)
Matthew Ryder KC	2020	
Nabiha Syed	2023	
Jonathan Paine	2024	
Jane Martinson	2025	
Sam Gregory	2025	

=== Past members ===
Name	Position
Alex Graham	Chair of the Scott Trust Limited (2016 – 2021)
Liz Forgan	Chair of the Scott Trust (2003 – 2008); Chair of Scott Trust Limited (2008 – 2016)
Hugo Young	Chair of the Scott Trust (1989 – 2003)
Alistair Hetherington	Chair of the Scott Trust (1984 – 1989)
Richard Scott	Chair of the Scott Trust (1956 – 1984)
AP Wadsworth	Chair of the Scott Trust (1948 – 1956)
JR Scott	Chair of the Scott Trust (1936 – 1948)
Heather Stewart	Journalist director of the Scott Trust Limited board (2011 – 2016)
Nils Pratley	Journalist director of the Scott Trust Limited board (2016 – 2022)

== The Guardian Foundation ==
Besides the GMG businesses, the company has a charitable wing: The Guardian Foundation led by Executive Director Rosie Parkyn.
