= Edward Taylor Scott =

British journalist and publisher (1883–1932)

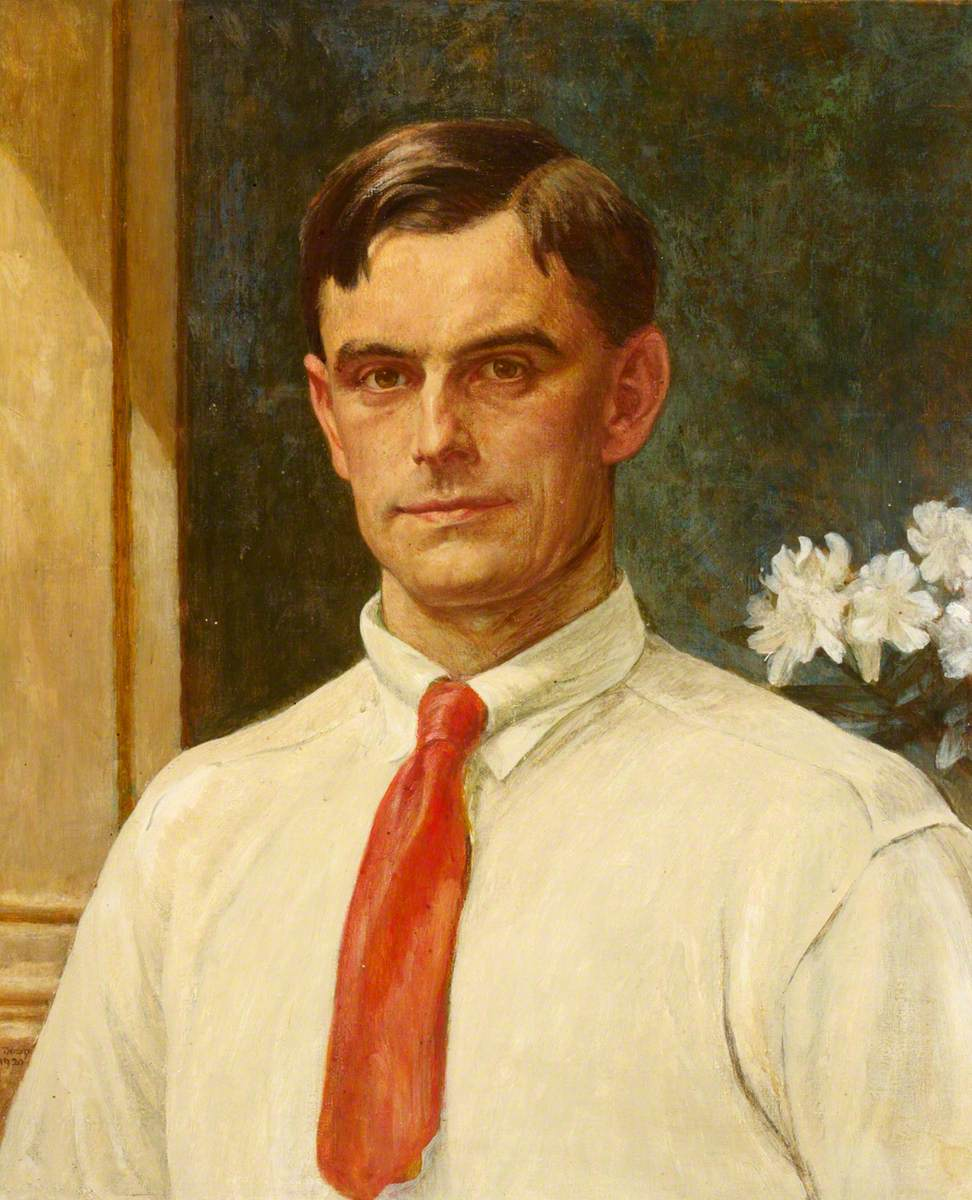
- Edward Taylor Scott by Francis Dodd
- Born: 15 November 1883
- Died: 22 April 1932 (aged 48); Windermere, England
- Occupation: journalist
- Known for: editor of the Manchester Guardian
- Parents: Charles Prestwich Scott (father); Rachel Susan Cook (mother)

Edward Taylor Scott (15 November 1883 – 22 April 1932) was a British journalist, who was editor and briefly co-owner of the Manchester Guardian, and the younger son of its editor-owner C. P. Scott.

After a brief spell at Oxford University, Ted Scott attended the London School of Economics, and eventually took a University of London external degree, having left the LSE to work as private secretary to Sidney Olivier, the governor of Jamaica. At the LSE, he lodged with the family of the economist and Guardian contributor J. A. Hobson, and he later married Hobson's daughter Mabel.

Scott joined the Manchester Guardian in 1913 and became its commercial editor and main writer of leaders on economic policy. In the spring of 1915, he joined the army to fight in World War I. In 1918, he was captured as a prisoner of war until the end of hostilities. After the war, he rejoined the paper, eventually succeeding his father as editor on 1 July 1929. Scott's most important action as editor was to move the paper from its initial position of support for Ramsay MacDonald's National Government towards the opposition.

Scott became joint owner of the Guardian with his brother John after the death of their father on New Year's Day, 1932. Less than four months later, he drowned while sailing on Windermere. His death put the future independence of the Guardian in doubt, as the Scott family struggled to pay the inheritance taxes. He was succeeded as editor by William Percival Crozier.

Media offices
| Preceded by C. P. Scott | Editor of The Manchester Guardian; 1929–1932 | Succeeded by William Percival Crozier |
