= C. P. Scott =

British journalist, publisher and politician (1846–1932)

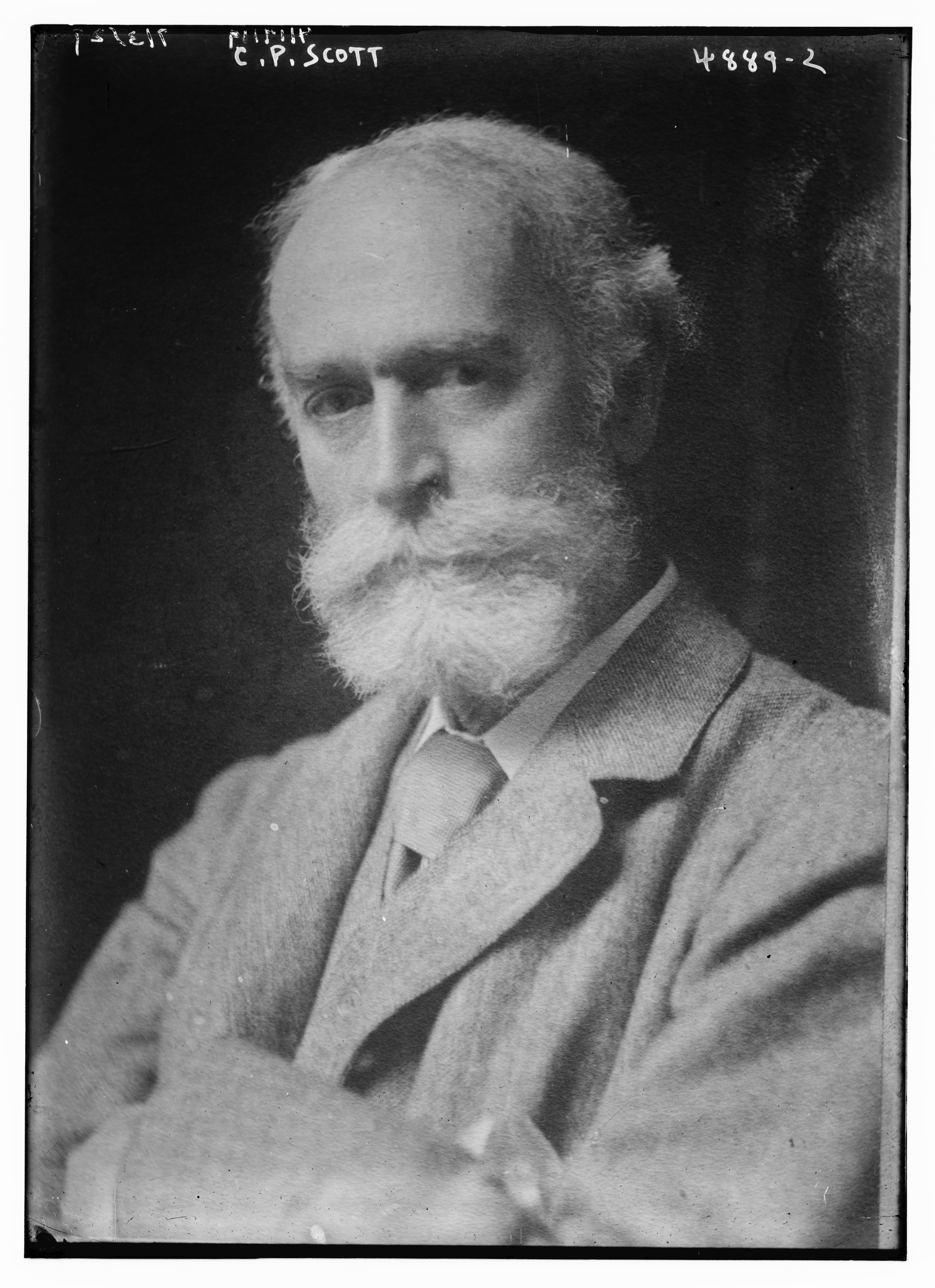
- Scott in 1919
- Born: Charles Prestwich Scott; 26 October 1846; Bath, Somerset, England
- Died: 1 January 1932 (aged 85)
- Education: Corpus Christi College, Oxford
- Occupations: Journalist, editor
- Spouse: Rachel Cook (1874–1905)
- Children: Madeline Scott; Laurence Scott; John Russell Scott; Edward Taylor Scott

Charles Prestwich Scott (26 October 1846 – 1 January 1932), usually cited as C. P. Scott, was a British journalist, publisher and politician. Born in Bath, Somerset, he was the editor of The Manchester Guardian (now The Guardian) from 1872 until 1929 and its owner from 1907 until his death. He was also a Liberal Member of Parliament and pursued a progressive-liberal agenda in the pages of the newspaper.

== Biography ==
=== Early years ===
Scott was the fourth son of the businessman Russell Scott and his wife Isabella Civil Prestwich, born at Bath, Somerset. He was educated at Hove House and Clapham Grammar School. He matriculated at Corpus Christi College, Oxford in 1865, taking a first in Greats and graduating B.A. in 1869.

Scott in 1870 went to Edinburgh to train on The Scotsman. While at Oxford, his cousin John Taylor, who ran the London office of The Manchester Guardian, decided that the paper needed an editor based in Manchester and offered Scott the post. Scott already enjoyed a familial connection with the paper; its founder, John Edward Taylor, was his uncle, and at the time of his birth Scott's father, Russell Scott, was the paper's owner, although he later sold it back to Taylor's sons under the terms of Taylor's will. Accepting the offer, Scott joined the paper as their London editor in February 1871 and became its editor on 1 January 1872.

As editor, Scott initially maintained The Manchester Guardian's well-established moderate Liberal line "to the right of the party, to the right, indeed, of much of its own special reporting". When in 1886 the Whigs led by Lord Hartington and a few Radicals led by Joseph Chamberlain split the party, formed the Liberal Unionist Party and gave their backing to the Conservatives, Scott's Manchester Guardian swung to the left and helped William Ewart Gladstone lead the party towards support for Irish Home Rule and ultimately the "new liberalism".

=== Parliamentary career ===
Parliamentary album of Scott, c. 1895

In 1886, Scott fought his first general election as a Liberal candidate, an unsuccessful attempt in the Manchester North East constituency; he stood again for the same seat in 1891 and 1892. He was elected at the 1895 UK general election as MP for Leigh, and thereafter spent long periods away in London during the parliamentary session. His combined position as a Liberal backbencher, the editor of an important Liberal newspaper, and the president of the Manchester Liberal Federation made him an influential figure in Liberal circles, albeit in the middle of a long period of opposition. He was re-elected at the 1900 UK general election despite the unpopular stand against the Boer War that the Guardian had taken, but retired from Parliament at the time of the Liberal landslide victory in the 1906 UK general election, when he was occupied with the difficult process of becoming owner of the newspaper he edited.

=== Taking ownership of The Manchester Guardian ===
In 1905, The Manchester Guardian's owner, Edward Taylor, died. His will provided that the trustees of his estate should give Scott first refusal on the copyright of the Manchester Guardian at £10,000, and recommended that they should offer him the offices and printing works of the paper on "moderate and reasonable terms". However, they were not required to sell it at all, and could continue to run the paper themselves "on the same lines and in the same spirit as heretofore". Furthermore, one of the trustees was a nephew of Taylor and would financially benefit from forcing up the price at which Scott could buy the paper, and another was The Manchester Guardian's manager, but faced losing his job if Scott took control. Scott was therefore forced to dig deep to buy the paper: he paid a total of £240,000, taking large loans from his sisters and from Taylor's widow (who had been his chief supporter among the trustees) to do so. Taylor's other paper, the Manchester Evening News, was inherited by his nephews in the Allen family. Scott made an agreement to buy the MEN in 1922 and gained full control of it in 1929.

=== Politics and relations with government ===
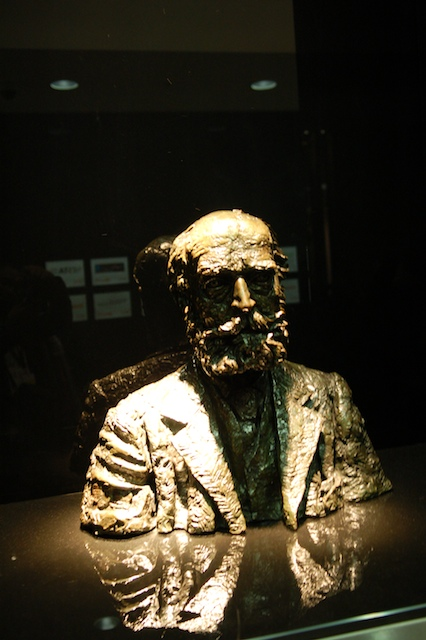
Bust of Scott in the offices of The Guardian, London

While in London, Scott stayed at the central location of Nottingham Place from where he could gather news intelligence on European developments and whether the government would declare war. Scott recorded that the German ambassador had been deceived into believing that Britain would stay outside the conflict. But liberal policy always accentuated one of "continuity" of free radicals at its heart. For Scott, the Cabinet remained too reluctant to act, too timid, clearly an indication of his movement towards MacDonald and Labour. They espoused a pacifist position in Britain, which he was warned was "pro-German". He was a friend of the radical Charles Hobhouse MP, who was not in the War Cabinet.

Scott turned his paper into a pacifist weapon against entering the war, and he lobbied the cabinet as well. His leaders denounced a "conspiracy to drag us into a war against England's interests", arguing that it would amount to a "crime against Europe" and warning that it would "throw away the accumulated progress of half a century". On Tuesday, 4 August 1914 – the day the king declared war – David Lloyd George told Scott, "Up until last Sunday only two members of the Cabinet had been in favour of our intervention in the war but the violation of Belgian territory had completely altered the situation".

Although a lifelong liberal, Scott had a troubled relationship with Lloyd George. Perhaps most instructive of his communicating skills was the introduction he made of Chaim Weizmann to Lloyd George. He struck up a remarkable friendship with the Jewish émigré, whose intellectual brilliance and business savvy was lately attracting the attention of even the Tory Press and senior ministers. Scott wrote regularly in the New Statesman dealing frankly and openly with the Samuel Memorandum; they would all come together in Downing Street for a top-level summit on the Palestine Question. But Scott also investigated Sir Roger Casement. His story was linked to Michael Collins' Dublin builder Batt O'Connor, who more than any Irishman had served to hide Collins's presence from the RIC. In Ulster Joe Devlin warned the Left of the impending violence should they not heed the warnings contained in the newspapers about the coming military occupation. The Curragh incident had profoundly shocked the establishment in Ireland; on 27 July 1916 Scott would hold just a one-off meeting with General Macready, Lord Reading and Lloyd George in the aftermath of the Easter Rising.

Scott was gregarious and frequently met at the Reform Club and with his left-wing friends at the Bath Club. His membership involved serious friendships with other editors, including G. Lowes Dickinson, but his closest political intimate was Irish leader John Dillon. They shared a socialist ambition for home rule, pacifism, conscriptionism and feminism.

=== Senior political journalist ===
Under his stewardship the Guardian continued to grow with Lloyd George's influence overseeing its place at the top table. In one such famous interview the new Prime Minister gave his "fight to the finish" speech. Scott was responsible for recruiting the correspondent Robert Dell whose role in Paris was to communicate on secret negotiations with the Quai D'Orsay and Bureau Anglais in a weekly column called "From Our Correspondent, Paris, Friday". Despite Lloyd George's objection to the reporter's anonymity there remained little chance of compromising their French colleagues in a city already renowned for prostitution. To the contrary, Thomas Spring Rice his friend suggested that it had "a most excellent effect here." Scott became friendly with Winston Churchill, at that time a Liberal, and dined with Lord Fisher but remained essentially anti-Conservative. Nonetheless, the War Office acknowledged the utility of civilians as contacts on the ground; Scott's opinion was solicited on anything from the strength of Irish war opinions to whether Churchill should be removed from office.

=== Views ===
In a 1921 essay marking the Manchester Guardian's centenary (at which time he had served nearly fifty years as editor), Scott put down his opinions on the role of the newspaper. He argued that the "primary office" of a newspaper is accurate news reporting, saying "comment is free, but facts are sacred". Even editorial comment has its responsibilities: "It is well to be frank; it is even better to be fair". A newspaper should have a "soul of its own", with staff motivated by a "common ideal": although the business side of a newspaper must be competent, if it becomes dominant the paper will face "distressing consequences".

While supporting female suffrage, Scott was hostile to militant suffragettes in his editorials, accusing them of employing "every engine of misguided fanaticism in order to wreck, if it be in their power, the fair prospects of their cause." He was just as disturbed by the General Strike of 1926, asking: "Will not the General Strike cease to be counted henceforth as a possible or legitimate weapon of industrial warfare?" He thought that Irish rebels were authors of their own destruction. On the execution of Padraig Pearse and James Connolly after the Easter Uprising in Dublin, he wrote that "it is a fate which they invoked and of which they probably would not complain". Scott was a supporter of Zionism.

=== Final years ===
Scott remained editor of the Manchester Guardian until 1 July 1929, at which time he was eighty-three years old and had been editor for exactly fifty-seven and a half years. His successor as editor was his youngest son, Ted Scott, though C. P. remained as Governing Director of the company and was at the Guardian offices most evenings. He died in the early hours of New Year's Day 1932.

=== Family ===
In 1874, Scott married Rachel Cook, who had been one of the first undergraduates of the College for Women, then at Benslow House, Hitchin, later relocated and renamed as Girton College, Cambridge. She died in 1905, in the midst of the dispute over Taylor's will. Their daughter Madeline married a long-time Guardian contributor, Charles Edward Montague. Scott's eldest son Laurence died in 1908, aged 31, after contracting tuberculosis. His middle son John became the Manchester Guardian's manager and the founder of the Scott Trust. His youngest son, Ted, who succeeded his father as editor, drowned in a sailing accident after less than three years in the post. John and Ted Scott jointly inherited the ownership of the Manchester Guardian & Evening News Ltd.; after Ted's death, John gave it to the Scott Trust.

In 1882, having built a new house in Darley Dale in Derbyshire, Sir Joseph Whitworth leased The Firs in Fallowfield in Manchester to his friend C. P. Scott. After Scott's death the house became the property of the University of Manchester, and was the Vice-Chancellor's residence until 1991. Scott used to travel into his Cross Street office by bicycle. Scott was the grandfather of Evelyn Montague (1900–1948), the Olympic athlete and journalist depicted in the film Chariots of Fire. Montague, like his grandfather, wrote for the Manchester Guardian and became its London editor.

== Honours ==
Scott was elected to membership of the Manchester Literary and Philosophical Society on 12 May 1908. He was made a Freeman of the City of Manchester in 1930.

== Bibliography ==
Primary sources

- Hammond papers
- Lloyd George papers - contains a large number of letters and correspondence - British Library (BL).

Secondary sources

- Ayerst, David (1971). The Guardian: Biography of a Newspaper. London: Collins.
- Hammond, J. L. (1934). C.P. Scott of the Manchester Guardian. London: Bell.
- Lejeune, C. A. (1964). Thank You for Having Me. London: Hutchinson. (the author's mother was a friend of Scott)
- Scott, C. P. (1946). 1846–1932: the making of the Manchester Guardian. London: Frederick Muller. (5 extracts from Scott's writings; 18 other contributions)
- Wilson, Trevor, ed. (1970). The Political Diaries of C. P. Scott, 1911–1928. London: Collins.

Parliament of the United Kingdom
Preceded by Caleb Wright	Member of Parliament for Leigh; 1895–1906	Succeeded by John Brunner
Media offices
Preceded by John Edward Taylor	Editor of The Manchester Guardian; 1872–1929	Succeeded by Edward Taylor Scott
