= Rachel Scott (women's education reformer) =

Scott [née Cook], Rachel Susan, British educationist (1848–1905)

- Born: 8 March 1848; St Andrews, Fife, Scotland
- Died: 27 November 1905 (aged 57); Fallowfield, England
- Known for: Women's education reformer
- Spouse: C. P. Scott
- Parents: John Cook (father); Rachel Susan Farquhar (mother)

Rachel Scott (born Rachel Susan Cook; 8 March 1848 – 27 November 1905) was a Scottish-born advocate for women's education and a prominent figure in Manchester's late 19th-century education reform movement. One of the earliest women to attend the institution that later became Girton College, Cambridge, she achieved honours in the Classical Tripos at a time when women's access to higher education was limited. After her marriage to journalist C. P. Scott, she became an organiser, speaker, and administrator in Manchester's growing network of girls' and women's schools.

== Early life and education ==
Rachel Susan Cook came from an academic family in St Andrews, Scotland, one of five sisters. Her paternal line included three generations of divinity professors, including a Moderator of the Church of Scotland. Her education was at St Andrew's senior school, Madras College; by a private tutor; and then as one of the first six female students enrolled at the College for Women at Benslow House in Hitchin, England, which later became the University of Cambridge's Girton College, with Louisa Innes Lumsden. At this time, such women graduates were "rather special people ... exceptionally able, determined, ambitious". In 1873, Cook "graduated" as one of the first women at the University of Cambridge with honours in the classic Tripos, at second class.

This achievement was notable given the barriers women faced in higher education during the period. Alongside Sarah Woodhead and Louisa Innes Lumsden, Cook was later described as one of the "Girton pioneers." Contemporary accounts often emphasised her personal presence as well as her intellectual abilities, though such descriptions reflect the conventions of the period rather than her educational achievements. George Eliot described her as "sylphlike", and the most beautiful woman she had ever seen, and her obituary said that "there still remains in the minds of those who knew her then a memorable picture of her uncommonness, her dramatic instinct and critical quickness, and her eagerness and radiance of mind".

== Campaign for women's education ==
After marrying Charles Scott, known as C. P. Scott, in 1874, she moved to Manchester, where she joined the governing body of the city's Girls' High School. She continued to champion women's higher education by creating a home-based university-level teaching facility, supported by sympathetic professors from Owens College. Through her efforts this became incorporated into Owens College in 1883.

Scott was also a member of the Withington Girls' School governing body, was interested in the co-educational school Lady Barn House School and took a lead role in education in the city; her eloquence at public events to raise support for education for women and girls was remarked upon on in her obituary.

Her final speech in 1900 was in the Free Trade Hall to the assembled Manchester High School for Girls community.

Publishing anonymously, Scott translated classical Latin and French texts, including two novels in Balzac's Human Comedy novel cycle, as well as a guide to pictures in the Manchester Jubilee Exhibition of 1887.

In collaboration with her husband, she contributed literary criticism and commentary to the Manchester Guardian, where she supported women's suffrage and broader social reform.

Scott's influence and contribution to the city of Manchester was recognized in her husband's obituary.
