= Guardian Media Group =

British multinational mass media company

Guardian Media Group plc
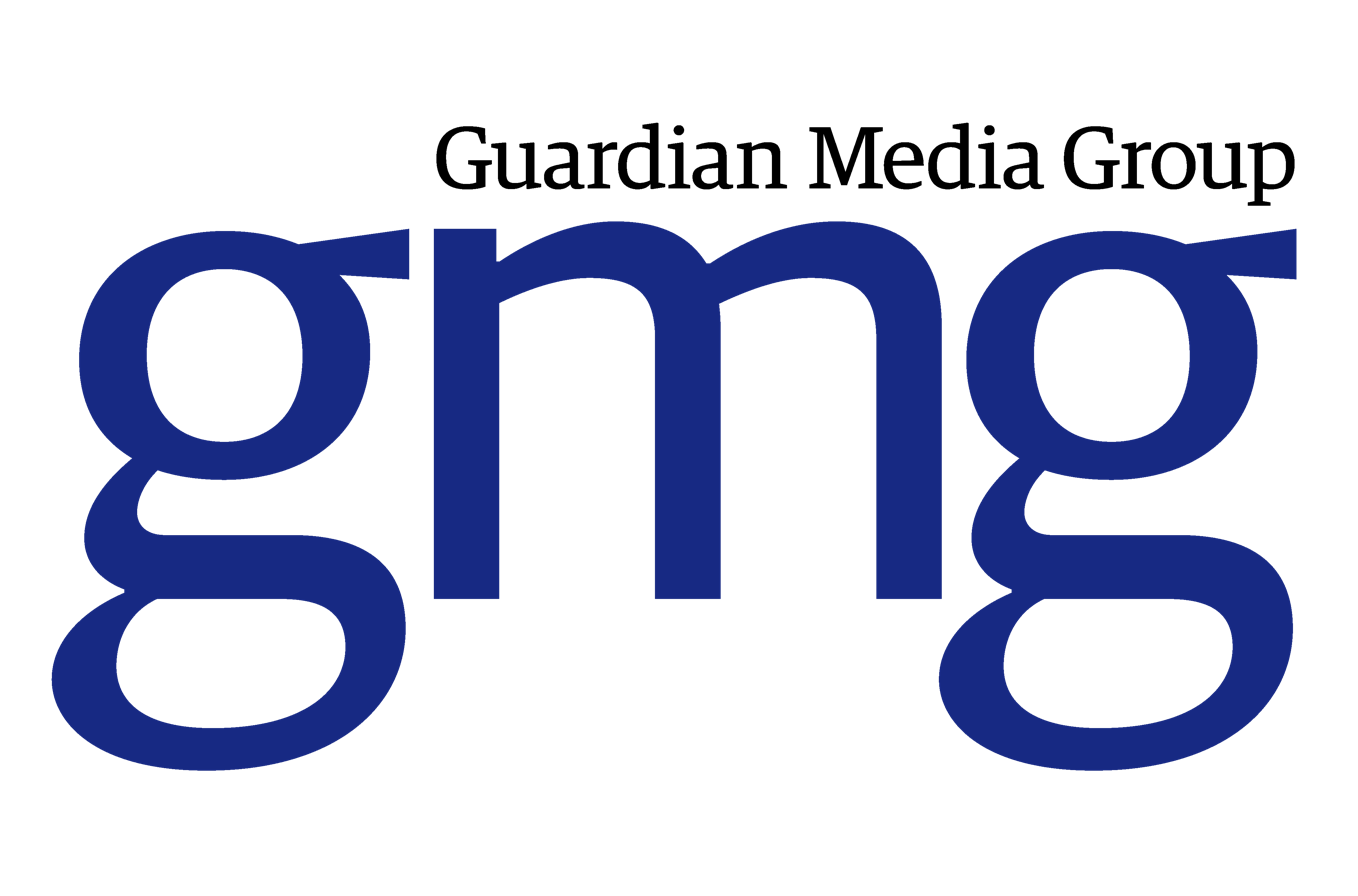
- Type: Public
- Industry: Media
- Founded: 1907; 119 years ago (Manchester Guardian); 1993 (Guardian Media Group plc)
- Founder: C. P. Scott
- Headquarters: London, England, UK
- Key people: Anna Bateson (CEO); Charles Gurassa (chair)
- Products: Newspapers, websites
- Revenue: ▲£264.4 million (2022-23)
- Operating income: ▼£-21.3 million (2022-23)
- Owner: Scott Trust Limited
- Number of employees: 1,241 (2023)
- Divisions: Guardian News & Media; Top Right Group (formerly Emap); GMG Property Services Group
- Website: www.theguardian.com/about/organisation

Guardian Media Group plc (GMG) is a British-based mass media company owning various media operations including The Guardian, and formerly The Observer. The group is wholly owned by the Scott Trust Limited, which exists to secure the financial and editorial independence of The Guardian in perpetuity.

The Group's annual report (for the year ending 2 April 2023) indicated that the Scott Trust Endowment Fund was valued at £1.24 billion, while in 2021 it was valued at £1.14 billion.

== History ==
The company was founded as the Manchester Guardian Ltd. in 1907 when C.P. Scott bought The Manchester Guardian (founded in 1821) from the estate of his cousin Edward Taylor.

It became the Manchester Guardian and Evening News Ltd when it bought out the Manchester Evening News in 1924, later becoming the Guardian and Manchester Evening News Ltd to reflect the change in the morning paper's title. It adopted its current name in 1993.

In 1991, it had a 20% stake in a consortium which included London Weekend Television (LWT), Scottish Television, The Walt Disney Company and Carlton Communications for a new ITV breakfast franchise called GMTV.

Guardian Monthly was a glossy magazine published by the Guardian Media Group for readers around the world. Launched in November 2006, it made selections from The Guardian and The Observer's magazine supplements available to an international audience of English-speakers. Issues contained interviews with cultural figures, features about world issues, and regular articles on travel, books, sport, health, fashion, food and photography. In July 2007, the Guardian Media Group announced the cancellation of the Guardian Monthly. In a letter to subscribers, Will Ricketts, Guardian Monthly's publisher, explained the reasons for the cancellation of the monthly magazine:

The company is taking a long-term strategic view of its activities and although Guardian Monthly has performed well in the busy and competitive international marketplace, we have decided that it is not the right time to continue with a global magazine offering.

In March 2007, GMG sold 49.9% of Trader Media Group to Apax Partners, in a deal that valued Trader Media Group at £1.35 billion. In December 2007, it was announced that GMG and Apax had made a successful bid to buy Emap's business-to-business arm for around £1 billion. In June 2018, GMG acquired ContentNext Media of technology blog paidContent; All Things Digital estimated the purchasing price to be up to $30 million pending certain performance goals.

In February 2010, the group sold its GMG Regional Media division (consisting of two companies MEN Media and S&B Media which operated 31 local and regional newspaper titles) to Trinity Mirror for £44.8 million. The sale eroded the connection between The Guardian and Manchester as the sale of the Manchester Evening News was included in the package. The division's local television station for Greater Manchester, Channel M, and two newspapers in Woking were not included in the sale.

GMG sold ContentNext Media's paidContent and other assets to Gigaom in February 2012. In June 2012, GMG sold its GMG Radio division, which operated Real Radio and Smooth Radio, to Global Radio.

In January 2014, GMG disposed of its remaining interest in Trader Media Group.

Carolyn McCall was the chief executive of Guardian Media Group and chair of Guardian News and Media Limited from 2006 until June 2010, when she was appointed chief executive of EasyJet. Andrew Miller, previously the chief financial officer of the Group, was chief executive from July 2010 to 2015. David Pemsel took his place in 2015.

In October 2017, the Guardian Media Group reported a plan to launch a new £42 million venture capital fund. That plan was consummated, making the Scott Trust a limited partner in GMG Ventures LP. According to the GMG 2018 annual report, "this £42m venture capital fund is designed to contribute financial returns and to support GMG's strategy by investing in early stage businesses focused on developing the next generation of media technology".

In January 2020, it was announced that Annette Thomas would become the new chief executive in March 2020. Thomas was formerly editor of Nature, MD of Nature Publishing Group and chief executive of Macmillan Science and Education. She replaced David Pemsel who left to take up a role at the Premier League.

In May 2021, The Daily Telegraph reported Guardian editor Katharine Viner and Thomas were in conflict over finances and the direction the newspaper should take. The previous year The Guardian announced 180 job cuts. Thomas had earlier said at a media industry conference "we have quality content in spades ... the job at hand is to now go further by strengthening the growing elements of our business". Viner wanted renewed investment after better than feared financial results in 2020. On 9 June 2021, it was announced that Thomas would leave the Guardian Media Group at the end of the month.

In August 2022, Anna Bateson was appointed as chief executive. Subsequently Anders Jensen, chief executive of Viaplay, resigned as a GMG non-executive director because of the appointment process, in particular the level of influence exerted by Guardian editor Katharine Viner.

In September 2024, The Guardian revealed it was in talks to sell The Observer to news website Tortoise Media. Journalists at Guardian Media Group voted to condemn the sale and passed a vote of no confidence in the newspaper's owners, accusing it of betrayal amid concerns that the sale of the paper could harm the financial security of staff members. The sale took place on 22 April 2025.

In May 2025, GMG won a defamatory lawsuit brought by a man in Afghanistan who sued the company for mistakenly using his image to illustrate an article about the murder of Hamed Sabouri (who was a gay man) in Afghanistan in August 2022. In his ruling, High Court Justice Jeremy Johnson found that being labelled a homosexual is not defamatory for common law.

== Group structure ==
GMG's core business is Guardian News & Media Limited, publisher of theguardian.com, and The Guardian newspaper. Guardian News & Media was formed as Guardian Newspapers Limited in 1967, adopting its present name in 2006.

The group has a portfolio of investments to help support its journalism. They comprise:

- Ascential: an international business-to-business digital intelligence and events business.
- An externally managed investment fund.

Guardian Media Group exists to support the core purpose of its owner, Scott Trust Limited: to secure the financial and editorial independence of The Guardian in perpetuity, but in the 2011/12 year the group lost £75.6 million, and for the three years up to June 2012, the paper itself lost £100,000 a day - leading The Economist's Intelligent Life magazine to question whether The Guardian could survive. In late 2013, GMG sold their GMG Property Services Group to private equity firm Lloyds Development Capital (rebranded to Property Software Group), citing that it would allow them to focus on investing in the core part of their business—Guardian News and Media. In 2014, The Guardian launched a membership scheme, aiming to avoid introducing a paywall and maintaining open access to the website. As of 2018, this approach was considered successful, having brought more than 1 million subscriptions or donations, with the paper hoping to break even by April 2019, a goal they achieved in May 2019.
