= Oliver Duff (British editor) =

British journalist (born 1983)

- Born: 1983 (age 42–43); Leighton Buzzard, Bedfordshire, England
- Education: Cedars Upper School; St John's College, Cambridge
- Occupation: Editor of The i Paper
- Employer: The Independent
- Title: Editor

Oliver Duff (born 1983) is a British journalist who has been the editor of The i Paper since June 2013.

Duff was formerly a reporter, gossip columnist and news editor, before becoming Executive Editor at The Independent, the i and The Independent on Sunday, controlling the newsroom.

== Early life ==
Duff was born in 1983 in Leighton Buzzard, Bedfordshire. He is an ex-student of Cedars Upper School. Brought up in Bedfordshire, Duff had early career intentions of becoming an explorer, then Arsenal goalkeeper, before finally deciding on journalism, when he started writing for his local paper, the Leighton Buzzard Observer. He read Politics at St John's College, Cambridge (2001–2004), He became editor of the student paper, Varsity in 2002.

== Career ==
Before starting work in 2002, in newspapers as an admin assistant at The Guardian, The Daily Telegraph and The Observer. Then in 2003, he got a staff job as an admin assistant on the Independent newsdesk "writing odds and sods after hours" before moving up to a staff reporter role. Simon Kelner then offered him the job of editing the "Pandora" diary column.

Duff then worked as a travel writer (which he occasionally still does), and news editor. Although he was fired as a bar critic after three weeks, he (and an investigative team of reporters) was nominated for the Cudlipp Award (by British Press Awards) for excellence in popular journalism.

He later became deputy home news editor, shortly before Roger Alton replaced Simon Kelner as Independent editor in April 2008.

Duff was a member of the team that launched the i newspaper in October 2010 and he has covered the Olympics, two general elections, the London terror attacks and the phone hacking scandal.

In 2010 Duff moved up to become news editor and after a year in that job he was made executive editor under Chris Blackhurst (who became Independent editor in July 2011).

Duff was made editor of the i at the same time that Amol Rajan became editor of The Independent, in June 2013.

Duff writes an editor's letter every day in the newspaper. Topics include nature and science, politics and diplomacy.

== Other notes ==
He lives in central London with his partner. Away from work, he is a member of the Royal Geographical Society.

He loves sharks.

Media offices
Preceded by Stefano Hatfield	Editor of i 2013–present	Incumbent
