= Paul Webster (journalist) =

British journalist

- Born: Paul Frederick Webster; 20 February 1954 (age 71)
- Occupation: Journalist
- Known for: Editor of The Observer, 2018–2024

Paul F. Webster (born 20 February 1954) is a British journalist who was the editor of The Observer from 2018 to 2024. He was previously the deputy editor of The Observer for 20 years under Will Hutton, Roger Alton, and John Mulholland, and before that, the foreign and home editor of The Guardian.

== The Observer ==
Webster became editor of The Observer as a result of his promotion by Guardian Media Group editor-in-chief Katharine Viner, who said he would be a "superb" editor. Webster said: "I am delighted and honoured to be appointed editor, especially at such an exciting time in the paper’s development as it relaunches in its new tabloid format." He succeeded John Mulholland, who took up a role as editor of Guardian US in the Manhattan-based American online presence of the British print newspaper in April 2018.

On 16 July 2024, it was announced that Webster would be retiring from his role as editor of The Observer in the autumn.

Media offices
Preceded by John Price	Deputy Editor of The Observer; 1996–2018	Succeeded by Lucy Rock
Preceded by John Mulholland	Editor of The Observer; 2018–2024	Succeeded by Lucy Rock
