= Andrew Marr =

British journalist (born 1959)

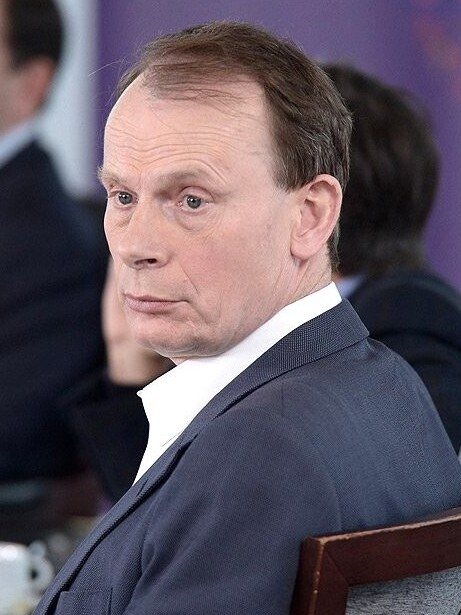
- Marr in 2014
- Born: Andrew William Stevenson Marr; 31 July 1959 (age 67); Glasgow, Scotland
- Education: Trinity Hall, Cambridge
- Occupations: Journalist, broadcaster
- Years active: 1981–present
- Television: BBC News; The Andrew Marr Show
- Spouse: Jackie Ashley (m. 1987)
- Children: 3
- Parent(s): Donald and Valerie Marr

Andrew William Stevenson Marr (born 31 July 1959) is a Scottish journalist, author, broadcaster and presenter. Beginning his career as a political commentator at The Scotsman, he subsequently edited The Independent newspaper from 1996 to 1998 and was political editor of BBC News from 2000 to 2005.

In 2002, Marr took over as host of BBC Radio 4's long-running Start the Week Monday morning discussion programme. He began hosting a political programme—Sunday AM, later called The Andrew Marr Show—on Sunday mornings on BBC One in September 2005.

In 2007, Marr presented Andrew Marr's History of Modern Britain, a BBC Two documentary series on the political history of post-war Britain, which was followed by a prequel in 2009, Andrew Marr's The Making of Modern Britain, focusing on the period between 1901 and 1945. In September 2012, Marr began presenting Andrew Marr's History of the World, a series examining the history of human civilisation.

After suffering a stroke in January 2013, Marr spent two months in hospital before returning to his role as presenter of The Andrew Marr Show in September of that year. Marr departed the BBC in December 2021, and in 2022 he launched his own regular programmes on LBC, Tonight with Andrew Marr, and Classic FM. Additionally, he became Political Editor of the New Statesman.

== Early life ==
Marr was born in Glasgow, Scotland, on 31 July 1959 to Donald Marr, an investment trust manager, and his wife, Valerie. Regarding his upbringing, he has said: "My family are religious and go to church... [a]nd I went to church as a boy". His father was an elder in the local Church of Scotland ('the Kirk'), in Longforgan, which Marr grew up in. Marr was educated in Scotland at Craigflower Preparatory School, the independent High School of Dundee; and at Loretto School, also a private school, in Musselburgh, East Lothian, where he was a member of Pinkie House and a prefect. He went on to read English at Trinity Hall, Cambridge, graduating with a first class honours degree.

== Print career ==
Marr joined The Scotsman as a trainee and junior business reporter in 1981. In 1984, he moved to London where he became a parliamentary correspondent for the newspaper, and then a political correspondent in 1986. Marr met the political journalist Anthony Bevins, who became his mentor and close friend. Bevins was responsible for Marr's first appointment at The Independent as a member of the newspaper's launch staff, also in 1986.

Marr left shortly afterwards, and joined The Economist, where he contributed to the weekly "Bagehot" political column and ultimately became the magazine's political editor in 1988. Marr has remarked that his time at The Economist "changed me quite a lot" and "made me question a lot of my assumptions".

Marr returned to The Independent as the newspaper's political editor in 1992, and became its editor in 1996 during a particularly turbulent time at the paper. Faced with price cutting by the Murdoch-owned Times, sales had begun to decline, and Marr made two attempts to arrest the slide. He made use of bold 'poster-style' front pages, and then in 1996 radically re-designed the paper along the lines of a mainland European model, with Gill Sans headline fonts, and stories being grouped together by subject matter, rather than according to strict news value. This tinkering ultimately proved disastrous. With a limited advertising budget, the re-launch struggled for attention, then was mocked for reinterpreting its original marketing slogan 'It Is – Are You?' to read 'It's changed – have you?'.

At the beginning of 1998, Marr was dismissed, according to one version of events, for having refused to reduce the newspaper's production staff to just five subeditors. According to Nick Cohen's account, the sacking was due to the intervention of Alastair Campbell, director of communications for Tony Blair. Campbell had demanded that David Montgomery, the paper's publisher, dismiss Marr over an article in which he had compared Blair with his predecessor John Major. This article had followed an earlier one by Blair published in The Sun, in which Blair had written: "On the day we remember the legend that St George slayed a dragon to protect England, some will argue that there is another dragon to be slayed: Europe." Marr's response asserted that Blair had spoken in bad faith, opportunistically championing Europe to pro-EU audiences while criticising it to anti-EU ones; and that the phrase "some will argue" was Blair's disingenuous rhetorical ruse to distance himself from the xenophobic appeal that he himself was making.

Three months later, Marr returned to The Independent. Tony O'Reilly had increased his stake in the paper and bought out owners, the Mirror Group. O'Reilly, who had a high regard for Marr, asked him to collaborate as co-editor with Rosie Boycott, in an arrangement whereby Marr would edit the comment pages, and Boycott would have overall control of the news pages.

Many pundits predicted the arrangement would not last and two months later, Boycott left to replace Richard Addis as editor of the Daily Express. Marr was sole editor again, but only for one week. Simon Kelner, who had worked on the paper when it was first launched, accepted the editorship and asked Marr to stay on as a political columnist. Kelner was not Marr's "cup of tea", Marr observed later, and he left the paper for the last time in May 1998.

Marr was then a columnist for the Daily Express and The Observer. Marr presented a three-part television series shown on BBC Two from 31 January to 2 February 2000 after Newsnight. A state-of-the-nation reflection, The Day Britain Died (2000) also had an accompanying book. Among Marr's other publications is My Trade: A Short History of British Journalism (2004).

In 2021, he joined the New Statesman as its chief political commentator.

== Broadcast career ==
=== BBC ===
==== Political editor ====
Marr was appointed the BBC's political editor in May 2000. During his time as political editor, Marr assumed various presenting roles.

Marr made cameo appearances in the Doctor Who episodes "Aliens of London" and "World War Three".

In April 2003, after Baghdad was captured by the invading forces during the Iraq War, Marr said on the BBC News at Ten: "It would be entirely ungracious, even for [Tony Blair's] critics, not to acknowledge that tonight he stands as a larger man and a stronger prime minister as a result."

Marr announced in 2005 that following the 2005 general election, he would step down as political editor to spend more time with his family. He was succeeded as political editor by Nick Robinson.

==== The Andrew Marr Show and other programmes ====
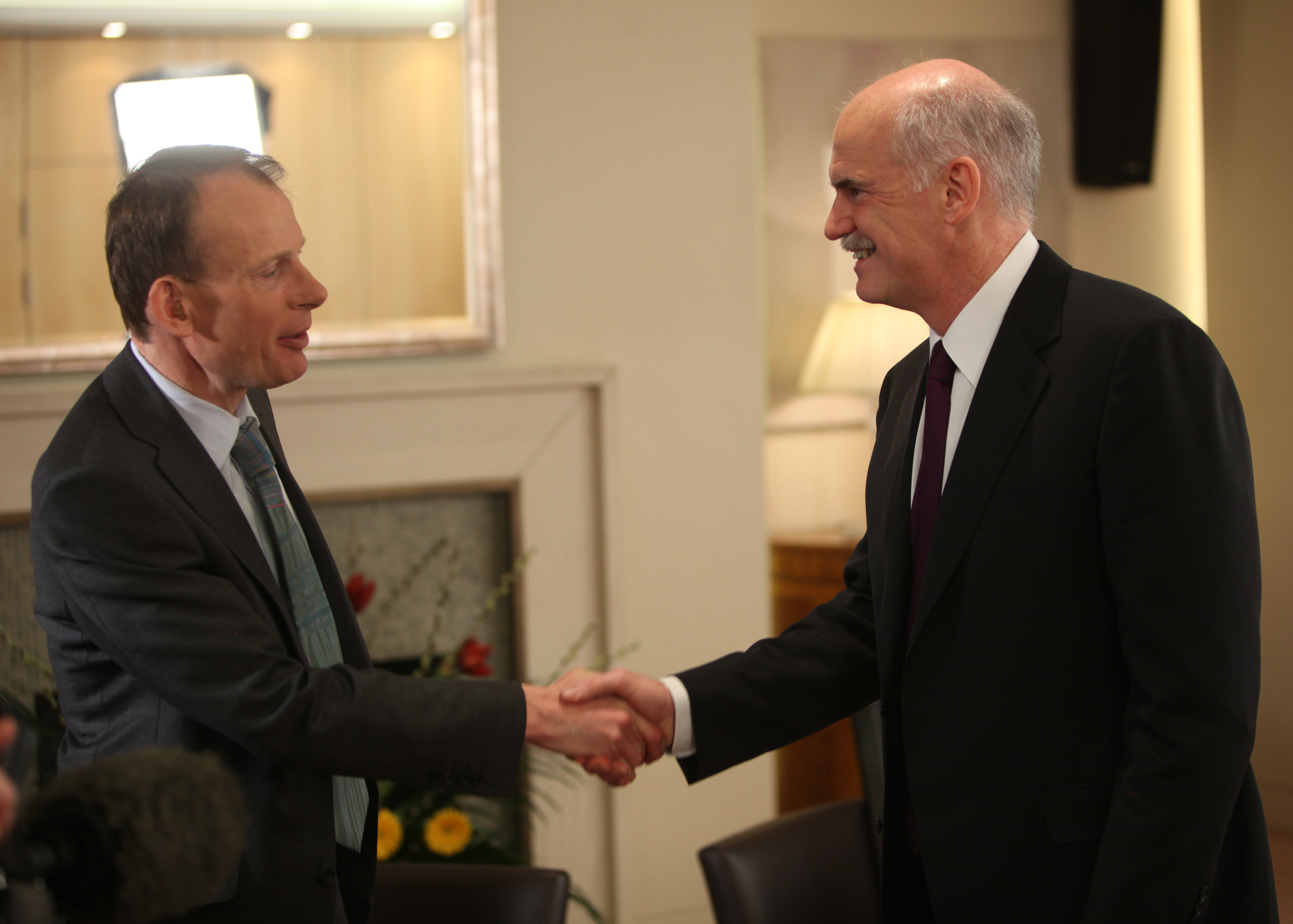
Marr (left) meeting former Greek Prime Minister George Papandreou in 2010

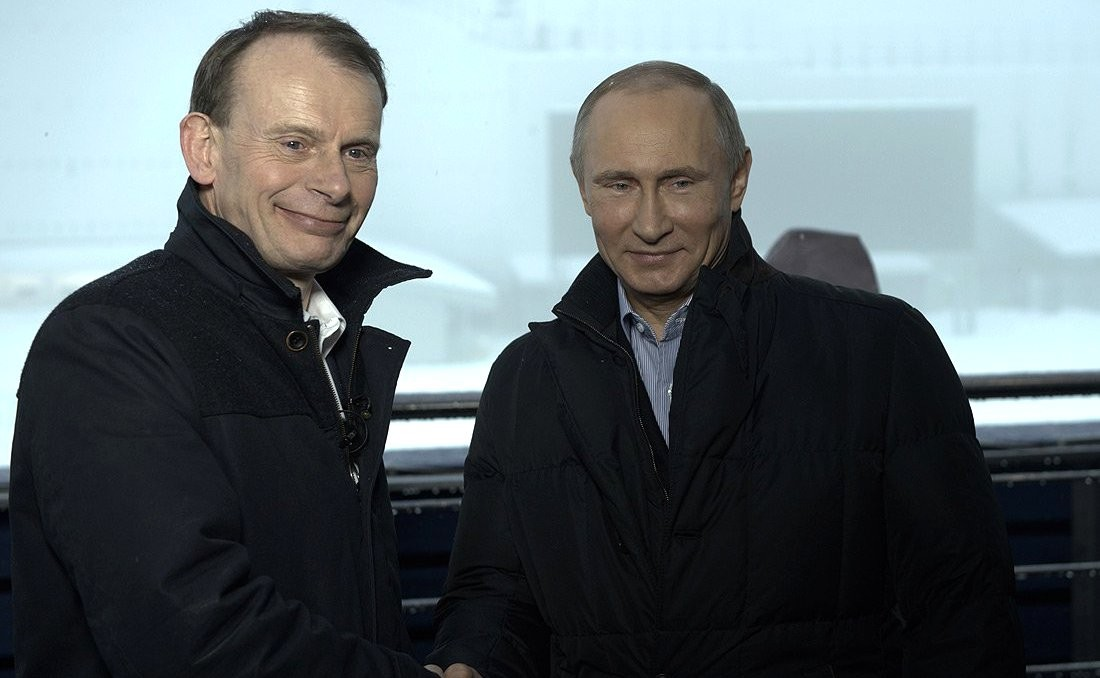
Marr interviewing Vladimir Putin ahead of the 2014 Winter Olympics in Russia

In September 2005, he moved to a new role presenting the BBC's Sunday morning flagship news programme Sunday AM, known as The Andrew Marr Show since September 2007; the slot was previously filled by Breakfast with Frost and hosted by Sir David Frost. Marr also presented the BBC Radio 4 programme Start the Week until his illness in 2013, and he returned as the programme's regular host until he left the BBC.

In May and June 2007, the BBC broadcast Andrew Marr's History of Modern Britain. He presented the series of five one-hour documentaries chronicling the history of Britain from 1945 to 2007. Unsold copies of the book of the series, a best-seller, were recalled in March 2009 by publishers Macmillan when legal action was taken over false claims that domestic violence campaigner Erin Pizzey had been a member of The Angry Brigade terrorist group. According to her own account, in a Guardian interview in 2001, Pizzey had been present at a meeting when they discussed their intention of bombing Biba, a fashion store, and threatened to report their activities to the police. Damages were paid to Pizzey and Marr's book was republished with the error removed.

In 2008, he presented the prime time BBC One series Britain From Above. The following year, he contributed a three-part series called Darwin's Dangerous Idea to the BBC Darwin Season, celebrating the bicentenary of Charles Darwin and the 150th anniversary of the publication of his theory of evolution.

In late 2009, BBC Two broadcast his six-part television series on British politics in the first half of the 20th century Andrew Marr's The Making of Modern Britain.

In September 2009 on the Sunday before the Labour Party conference in Brighton, Marr interviewed Prime Minister Gordon Brown. Towards the end of the interview, Marr told Brown he wanted to ask about:

Something everybody has been talking about in the Westminster village... A lot of people in this country use prescription painkillers and pills to help them get through. Are you one of them?

The Prime Minister responded: "No. I think this is the sort of questioning which is all too often entering the lexicon of British politics." Marr was later heavily criticised by Labour politicians, the media and fellow political journalists for what was described as a vague question which relied on its source being a single entry on a political blog. In a later interview with Krishnan Guru-Murthy of Channel 4 News, John Ward, the author of the Not Born Yesterday blog, stated that he had no proof to back up the claim.

In 2010, Marr presented a series, Andrew Marr's Megacities, examining the life, development and challenges of some of the largest cities in the world.

In early 2012, Marr presented The Diamond Queen, a three-part TV series on BBC One looking at the life and reign of Queen Elizabeth II in the run-up to the main celebrations of her Diamond Jubilee.

In 2012, Marr presented an eight-part series on BBC One entitled Andrew Marr's History of the World, in conjunction with the Open University.

Following the death of former Prime Minister Margaret Thatcher on 8 April 2013, Marr narrated a memorial documentary, Margaret Thatcher: Prime Minister.

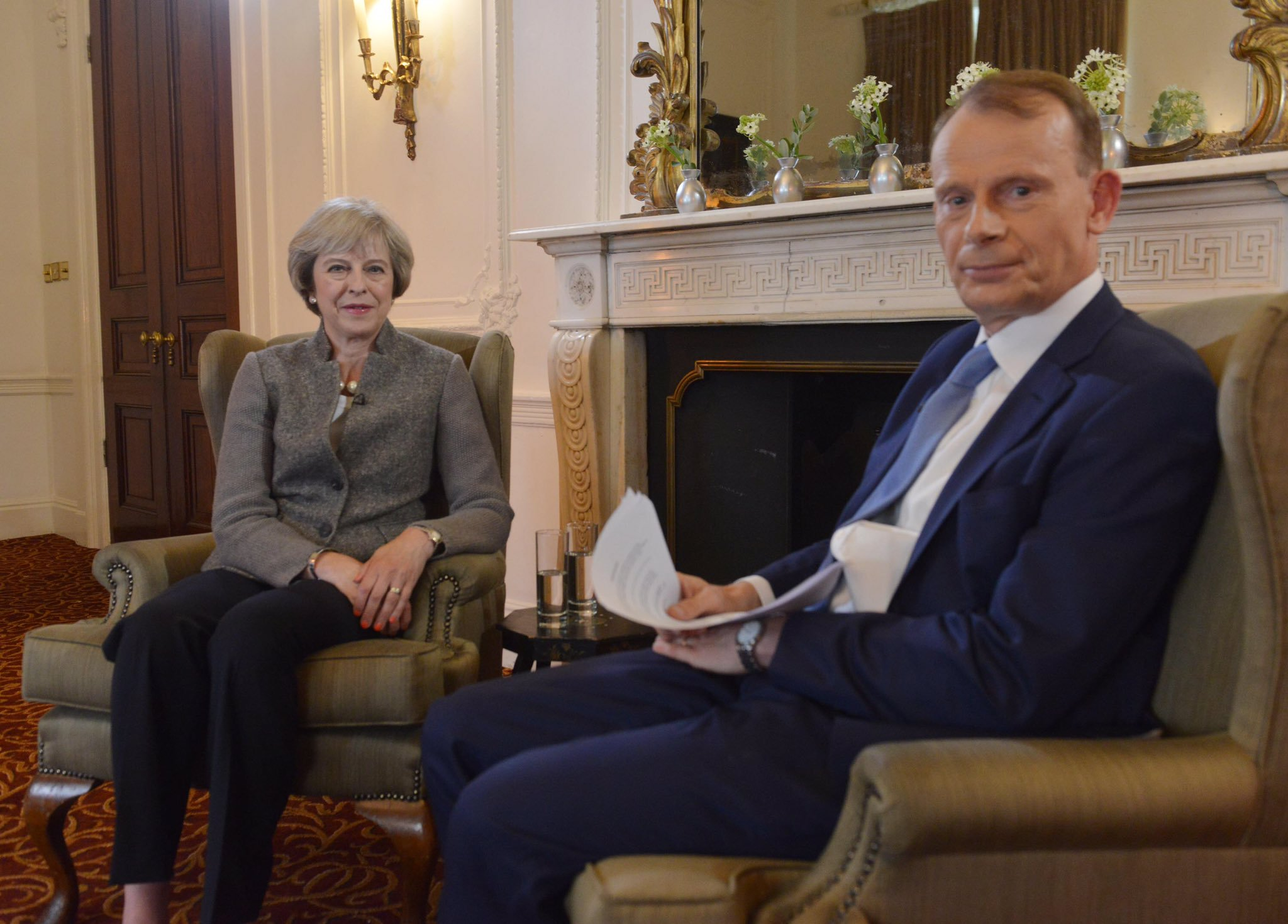
Theresa May gave her first interview as Prime Minister with Andrew Marr.

On an 8 April 2018, BBC Sunday news programme Marr said "lots of Palestinian kids" were killed by Israeli forces. The journalist and campaigner Jonathan Sacerdoti complained that the statement was misleading and false. BBC management ruled that Marr breached editorial guidelines, that the statement lacked any evidence and "risked misleading audiences on a material point".

Marr portrayed himself in the 2018 BBC series Bodyguard, interviewing Keeley Hawes' character Julie Montague, and wrote an opinion piece for The Guardian about his decision to do so.

On 1 December 2019, Marr interviewed British Prime Minister Boris Johnson and discussed Islamic terrorist Usman Khan, perpetrator of the 2019 London Bridge stabbing. Marr claimed the government had done nothing since 2010 to tighten the rules on sentencing for terrorist offences, implying that Johnson could have stopped Khan's early release. In reality, Johnson's government had lengthened the minimum early release, and in Khan's case any legislation would have needed to be retrospective anyhow. The BBC Editorial Complaints Unit therefore found that Marr had misled viewers on two counts.

In 2020, Marr presented a ten-part series called, Great Paintings of the World with Andrew Marr on Channel 5 in the UK.

=== Global ===
On 19 November 2021, Marr announced that he was leaving the BBC and joining Global in 2022 to host a new opinion programme on LBC called Tonight with Andrew Marr, host a new arts and interview programme on Classic FM, present a new weekly podcast on Global Player, and write a regular column for the LBC's website. He said, "Coming to Global gives me a new freedom to do fast-paced very regular political journalism on LBC with no filter in entirely my own voice". His first LBC show aired on 7 March 2022.

== Politics ==
Regarding his political affiliations, Marr is a former Maoist and was a member of the Socialist Campaign for a Labour Victory, a left-wing pressure group founded by Labour Party members, now known as the Alliance for Workers' Liberty. His interest in Mao Zedong began as early as age eleven, when he gave fellow Craigflower School students copies of the Little Red Book that he had requested and received from the Chinese embassy. His affinity for Maoism continued into his time at Cambridge, where Marr says he was a "raving leftie" who acquired the nickname "Red Andy".

Marr has written about the need to remain impartial and "studiously neutral" whilst delivering news reports and "convey fact, and nothing more". At an October 2006 BBC seminar discussing impartiality, Marr highlighted alleged bias within the BBC. He stated: "The BBC is not impartial or neutral. It's a publicly funded, urban organisation with an abnormally large number of young people, ethnic minorities, and gay people. It has a liberal bias, not so much a party-political bias. It is better expressed as a cultural liberal bias."

In May 2021, Marr spoke about his frustration at having to maintain his impartiality at the BBC and not being able to speak in his own voice. He said: "I think it will be very, very hard for people like me to carry on being completely neutral and completely sotto voce all the way through that ... At some point, I want to get out and use my own voice again."

In The Daily Telegraph, in 2007, he said that he was a libertarian when discussing his conflicting views on smoking bans. Writing in The Guardian in 1999, he defined himself as a "pampered white liberal" and said that:

... though teachers are the most effective anti-racist campaigners in the country, this means more than education in other religions it means a form of political education. Only people who understand the economic forces changing their world, threatening them but also creating new opportunities, have a chance of being immune to the old tribal chants. And the final answer, frankly, is the vigorous use of state power to coerce and repress. It may be my Presbyterian background, but I firmly believe that repression can be a great, civilising instrument for good. Stamp hard on certain 'natural' beliefs for long enough and you can almost kill them off. The police are first in line to be burdened further, but a new Race Relations Act will impose the will of the state on millions of other lives too.

In March 2014, Marr was criticised for allegedly expressing his own opinion on an independent Scotland's membership of the EU while interviewing Scottish politician Alex Salmond on BBC Television.

In the New Statesman during 2015, Marr expressed the opinion that the new Labour Party leader Jeremy Corbyn may be electable and that Conservative leaders recognise this. Marr wrote, "Here and now, in 2015, we know diddly-squat." At that time Marr considered a Labour election victory under Corbyn unlikely.

In an interview in 2022, Marr described himself as "a fairly centrist social democrat". In 2024 he expressed qualified support for Keir Starmer's leadership of the Labour Party.

== Other work ==
Marr has helped support Sense, the National Deafblind and Rubella Association, and was the face of a Sense direct marketing appeal. He was President of the Galapagos Conservation Trust until 2013. In 2007 and 2014, Marr supported the charity iDE UK in the BBC Radio 4 Appeal and subsequently became a patron. His novels include Head of State (2014) and Children of the Master (2015).

== Personal life ==
In August 1987, Marr married Jackie Ashley, a fellow political journalist, in Surrey. She is a daughter of the Labour life peer, Lord Ashley of Stoke (1922–2012). The couple have a son and two daughters. Marr lives in Primrose Hill in north London, having moved there from East Sheen in 2013.

When asked about his religious views, Marr has said, "Am I religious? No. Do I believe in anything? No. I just don't have that bump", and has described himself as "an irreligious Calvinist".

In 2012, Marr was the subject of gossip after tabloid pictures emerged of him kissing a woman in a London park. He later commented that the woman had been his series producer.

=== Health ===
On 8 January 2013, Marr was taken to hospital after suffering a stroke at home. He left hospital on 3 March and said he hoped to return to work later in the year. He appeared as a guest on The Andrew Marr Show on 14 April and returned twice to interview David Miliband and the prime minister, David Cameron, before it was announced that he would return to presenting the show on 1 September 2013.

In May 2018, Marr went into hospital for an operation to deal with a malignant tumour on his kidney, from which he recovered after treatment.

=== Privacy injunction ===
On 28 June 2008, Richard Ingrams reported in The Independent that Marr had been granted a High Court "super-injunction" preventing disclosure in the media of "private" information, or the existence of the injunction. Private Eye had revealed the existence of the injunction earlier in the week, having successfully challenged the need for its existence to be kept secret.

On 26 April 2011, following legal action by Private Eye editor Ian Hislop, an interview with Marr was published in the Daily Mail, in which he revealed that the super-injunction had covered the reporting of an extra-marital affair with a female journalist. Hislop had filed a court challenge earlier in April 2011, and described the super-injunction as "pretty rank".

== Awards ==
In 1995, he was named Columnist of the Year at both the What the Papers Say Awards and the British Press Awards, and received the Journalist Award in the Channel 4 Political Awards of 2001.

Marr has received two British Academy Television Awards: the Richard Dimbleby Award at the 2004 ceremony and the award for Best Specialist Factual Programme (for his History of Modern Britain) at the 2008 ceremony.

Marr was awarded an honorary doctorate from Staffordshire University in 2009.

== Selected works ==
- Andrew Marr, My trade: a short history of British journalism (London, 2004) ISBN 978-0-330-47620-1
- Andrew Marr, A history of modern Britain (London, 2007) ISBN 978-0-330-51147-6
- Andrew Marr, The making of modern Britain (London, 2009) ISBN 9781743037362
- Andrew Marr, The Diamond Queen: Elizabeth II and her people (London, 2011) ISBN 9780230760943
- Andrew Marr, A history of the world (London, 2012) ISBN 9781743299371
- Andrew Marr, Head of state (New York, 2015) ISBN 9781468311563
- Andrew Marr, We British: the poetry of a people (London, 2015) ISBN 9780008130893
- Andrew Marr, A short book about painting (London, 2017) ISBN 9781849499934

Media offices
Preceded by	Political editor of The Economist; 1988–1992	Succeeded by
Preceded by	Political editor of The Independent; 1992–?	Succeeded by
Preceded by Charles Wilson	Editor of The Independent; 1996–1998	Succeeded by Rosie Boycott
Preceded by Rosie Boycott	Editor of The Independent; 1998; With: Rosie Boycott	Succeeded by Simon Kelner
Preceded by Robin Oakley	Political editor of BBC News; 2000–2005	Succeeded by Nick Robinson
Preceded by Stephen Bush	Political editor of the New Statesman; 2022–present	Incumbent
