= Lisa Markwell =

British journalist (born 1965)

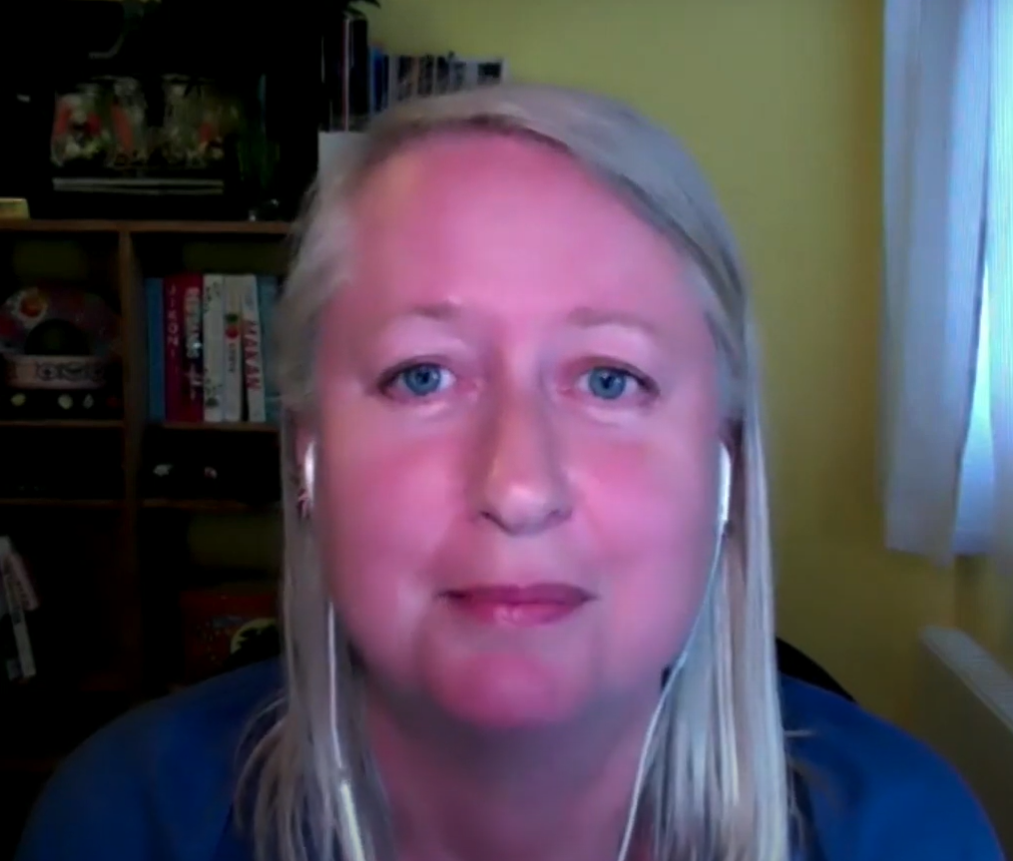
Markwell in 2021

Lisa Markwell (born 23 April) is a British journalist. She was the editor of The Independent On Sunday for three years, from April 2013 until its closure in March 2016. She was appointed by proprietor Evgeny Lebedev as the first of three new editors for his ESI Media portfolio; he announced the appointment in a tweet. From 2018 to 2021 she was the food editor of The Sunday Times. She is now the editor of The Telegraph Magazine.

== Early career ==
Markwell was born and raised in Buckinghamshire. She left Dr Challoner's High School for Girls in Little Chalfont when she was 16, working initially at Country Life magazine as a secretary before joining the (now defunct) fashion magazine Honey. She then worked at SKY and Elle magazines before joining the launch of The Sunday Correspondent in a team that included Peter Cole, Mick Brown, Ian Katz, Jonathan Freedland and Simon Kelner. After the closure of the paper, she worked as a commissioning editor for The Sunday Times and The Mail on Sunday colour supplement, You magazine. She was then recruited to edit a magazine for the department store Harvey Nichols before becoming deputy editor of the women's magazine Frank.

== The Independent ==
In 1998 the new editor of The Independent, Simon Kelner, hired Markwell to relaunch the Saturday magazine. By 2004 she was features editor in charge of the daily "Review" section, but left to launch the Condé Nast magazine, Easy Living. She rejoined The Independent in 2008, working across the paper and at one time editing "The New Review" magazine. In 2010, she became executive editor of the daily paper, helping to launch i.

== The Independent on Sunday ==
In April 2013, Markwell replaced John Mullin as editor of The Independent on Sunday when the paper embarked on an integration programme. During her editorship, Markwell highlighted the awareness of the plight of the Arctic 30 when her close friend Frank Hewetson, a Greenpeace activist, was imprisoned in Russia for attempting to occupy a drilling platform. Her decision in 2014 not to publish images or names relating to the murder of British aid worker Alan Henning led to the newspaper winning the British Press Award for Front Page of the Year. At the presentation of the award, Markwell commented that the newspaper had a full-time staff of 12. During her editorship, Markwell joined the committee of Women in Journalism, speaking publicly and taking part in panel debates about the difficulties facing women in the media.

In February 2016, it was announced that Independent Print Ltd had sold the i newspaper to the Johnston Press and were to close the print editions of The Independent and Independent on Sunday at the end of March.

== Career in food ==
After the closure of The Independent on Sunday, Markwell took a year out to train as a chef at Leiths School of Food and Wine 2017-2018, gaining a distinction level diploma. She worked as editor for a restaurant platform CODE Hospitality, and has been the food editor of both The Sunday Times and The Daily Telegraph.

== Personal life ==
Markwell lives in London and is married with two children. She has written about the adoption process and about the challenges facing children with special needs and their families. In 2009 she underwent treatment for breast cancer.

Media offices
Preceded by John Mullin	Editor of The Independent on Sunday; 2013 - 2016	Succeeded by closure of paper
