= McDonald's in the Pentagon =

Single by Silly Stu
- Released: February 25, 2025
- Genre: Ska
- Length: 1:06
- Songwriter: Anna Garcia-Daly
- Producers: Silly Stu; Spencer Vann

Silly Stu singles chronology
"McDonald's in the Pentagon" (2025)	"McDonald's in the Pentagon (Acoustic Extended Version)" (2025)

"McDonald's in the Pentagon" is a single by musician Silly Stu, released on February 25, 2025. The song gained significant traction when it went viral on the social media platform TikTok in March 2025.

== Background ==
The song references the presence of a McDonald's restaurant located within the Pentagon, which is not open to the general public. Lyrically, Silly Stu imagines what it is like to work at that location.

== Critical reception ==
Exclaim! described the song as a lighthearted and catchy ska parody, noting its humorous tone and nostalgic appeal, and compared its sound to music from Phineas and Ferb. Exclaim! also named the song a "Staff Pick." Chowhound stated the song to have a "catchy tune."

== Spread and popularity ==
Silly Stu initially posted an acoustic version of the song in early February 2025, which received over 1.8 million views on TikTok. The popularity of the song escalated with the posting of a ska version of the song on February 21, 2025, which included musician Spencer Vann. The song received massive engagement on various platforms, including a video that gained over one million likes and another that gained close to 200,000 likes. The trend sparked the development of memes, artwork, and discussions on various social platforms. According to Indy100, the song "McDonald's in the Pentagon" went viral on TikTok, amassing over 10.1 million views and being used in thousands of user‑generated videos across the platform.
