= John Mulholland (journalist) =

Irish journalist (born 1962)

John Mulholland (born 20 November 1962) is an Irish journalist who was the editor of the British Sunday newspaper The Observer for 10 years and assistant editor of The Guardian. He has worked for most of his career with the Guardian Media Group. In April 2018, he became the editor of Guardian US. He left this post in 2022.

== Early life and education ==
Mulholland was born in Ranelagh, Dublin, and has seven siblings. Mulholland received a degree in communications in 1983 from Dublin City University and he also studied for an MA in media and communications at California State University, Sacramento.

== Career ==
Mulholland worked as arts assistant at The Independent from 1987 to 1988, then briefly for London Daily News in the same role. He co-founded Listings Limited in 1988 as the deputy editor, providing arts and entertainments listings to newspapers.

He joined The Guardian as assistant editor of the arts desk in 1990, then became media editor in 1994. In 1998, he left The Guardian to manage the relaunch of Mirror Group Newspapers' Sporting Life, but his contract was ended after three months and before the launch after a disagreement over the management of the project.

=== The Observer ===
Mulholland rejoined the Guardian Media Group as deputy editor of The Observer in 1998, overseeing the magazines, sport, travel and culture sections. He developed and launched the monthly food, sport and music magazines and led the change of format to Berliner. He encouraged Nick Paton Walsh when Paton Walsh was a trainee at the newspaper, and entered his first piece into the Press Gazette's Young Journalist of the Year award in 2000, which it won.

==== Editorship ====
Mulholland succeeded Roger Alton as editor in January 2008 (announced in October 2007), having read The Observer as a teenager, and reshuffled the paper's editorial team. He closed the monthly sport, music and women's magazines in 2009, and relaunched the paper in February 2010 with four sections and a reduced staff of 70 to reduce costs.

Mulholland faced criticism and calls for his resignation due to an article by Julie Burchill published in The Observer on 13 January 2013, later withdrawn from the website, which was seen as transphobic. Mulholland responded on the comments page to what he described as "many emails protesting about this piece" and stated that he would be looking into the issue.

On 1 June 2015, Muholland additionally became an assistant editor of The Guardian in one of the first appointments made by Katharine Viner, the newly appointed editor-in-chief of Guardian News and Media. From July to Autumn 2017, Mulholland was the temporary editor of Guardian US while Lee Glendinning was on maternity leave. In April 2018, Mulholland became the editor of Guardian US, and was succeeded by his deputy, Paul Webster. On 10 February 2021 Nathan J. Robinson, editor-in-chief of Current Affairs and a former Guardian US columnist, published an article alleging that Mulholland fired Robinson from his position due to tweets critical of US military aid to Israel; in his emails to Robinson, Mulholland had suggested that Robinson had tweeted "fake news" and that, given the prevalence of anti-Semitic tropes, his tweets "were not helpful to public discourse." Mulholland left his post at Guardian US in 2022 and was succeeded by Betsy Reed.

Media offices
Preceded by Roger Alton and Jocelyn Targett	Deputy Editor of The Observer; 1998–2007 with Paul Webster	Succeeded by Paul Webster
Preceded by Roger Alton	Editor of The Observer; 2008–2018	Succeeded by Paul Webster
