= Andrew Marr's History of Modern Britain =

2007 British television documentary series

- Genre: Documentary
- Written by: Andrew Marr
- Directed by: Tom Giles (1,5); Fatima Salaria (2); Francis Whatley (3); Robin Dashwood (4)
- Presented by: Andrew Marr
- Composer: Robert Hartshorne
- Country of origin: United Kingdom
- Original language: English
- No. of series: 1
- No. of episodes: 5

Production
- Executive producer: Clive Edwards
- Producers: Chris Granlund (series); Tom Giles (1,5); Fatima Salaria (2); Francis Whatley (3); Robin Dashwood (4)
- Cinematography: Neil Harvey
- Running time: 55–60 mins
- Production company: BBC production

Original release
- Network: BBC Two
- Release: 22 May – 19 June 2007

Andrew Marr's History of Modern Britain is a 2007 BBC documentary television series presented by Andrew Marr that covers the period of British history from the end of the Second World War onwards. The series was highly praised and resulted in a follow-up series covering the period 1900 to 1945, Andrew Marr's The Making of Modern Britain. A book released by Marr accompanying the series and bearing the same name also details this period of history.

== Episodes ==
Title	Dates covered	Date of transmission	Audience figures
Advance Britannia	1945–1955	22 May 2007	3.1 million (14% share)
Britain in 1945; the country is victorious but nearly bankrupt. As Clement Attlee's Labour government sets out to build 'New Jerusalem', Britain is forced to hold out the begging bowl in Washington. Though Ealing Studios produces a series of very British comedies and there is a spirit of hope in the air, the British people's growing impatience with austerity threatens to take the country from bankruptcy to self-destruction.
The Land of Lost Content	1955–1964	29 May 2007	3.6 million
The 1950s were a period of apparent calm, order and prosperity for Britain, but much of the populace was hungry for change, many began to distrust the government and protestors and satirists led people to question and mock their rulers. In 1961, the liaison between working-class Christine Keeler and Secretary of State for War John Profumo brought the closed world of the British establishment together with the cocky new Britain growing up around it.
Paradise Lost	1964–1974	5 June 2007	3 million (14% share)
As the 1960s progress, Harold Wilson takes centre stage in a rapidly changing Britain as the country looks to modern technology and a fairer, liberated future. However, the Wilson governments presided over years of industrial conflict, stagnation and decline. As Edward Heath's government ascends to power in the 1970s, British industry is reduced to working a Three-Day Week, electricity is rationed and the country is again haunted by the shadow of wartime austerity. When Heath asks "Who governs?", the British public gave their answer.
Revolution!	1974–1990	12 June 2007	3.2 million (14% share)
Andrew examines the Britain of Margaret Thatcher, and comes to some surprising conclusions about the British national character. It was a period of extreme ideological polarisation. Imperial visions stirred again as the fleet sailed for the Falklands. Privatisation and deregulation amounted to a cultural, economic and political revolution. Heroic national rescue operation or final act of self-destruction? An exploration of the extent to which we British are all now the children of Thatcher.
New Britannia	1990–2007	19 June 2007	2.8 million (13% share)
Britain enters the uncharted waters of the post-Thatcher era. Many have done well in the end during the Thatcher years but now boom is turning to bust. Britain feels more vulnerable than ever to rapid international change – from the influence of powerful new global market forces to global warming. Just when many in post-war Britain are getting used to the good life, it seems we might have to start giving up our big cars and foreign holidays.

== Reception ==
=== Reviews ===
Fellow historian Tristram Hunt, writing in The Guardian, complimented Marr for his confrontational, argumentative, personalised history, stating that television history, done well, should be more of an ice-bath than a comforting, warm soak. Gareth McLean congratulated Marr for analysing the times in which he immerses himself, effortlessly communicating his enthusiasm, and hinting at fundamental truths of the human condition, which he stated was the future of factual programming. He was also impressed that Marr maintained his penetrating scrutiny and level of insight throughout the series. Lucy Mangan noted that the show shone a light of understanding into hitherto dark and musty corners of ignorance, but criticised the final episode for concentrating too much on Tony Blair's People's Princess speech after Princess Diana's death.

=== Complaints ===
In 2009, Marr's publisher, Macmillan Publishers, was successfully sued for libel by activist Erin Pizzey after his book A History of Modern Britain claimed she had once been part of the militant group Angry Brigade that staged bomb attacks in the 1970s. Pizzey became an opponent of the group and threatened to report their activities to the police when they discussed their intention of bombing Biba, a lively fashion store. The publisher also recalled and destroyed the offending version of the book, and republished it with the error removed.

A viewer complaint that Marr's comment on the community charge ("Unlike the old rates, it would be payable by everyone, not just homeowners") gave the inaccurate impression that householders who were tenants had not been liable for domestic rates. The BBC Editorial Complaints Unit upheld the complaint and promised the error would be corrected before any re-broadcast.

=== Awards ===
Award	Category	Result
Royal Television Society Awards 2008	Best History Series	Won
Royal Television Society Awards 2008	Best Presenter	Won (Andrew Marr)
Broadcasting Press Guild Awards 2008	Best Documentary Series	Won
Broadcasting Press Guild Awards 2008	Best TV Performer in a Non-Acting Role	Won (Andrew Marr)
British Academy Television Awards 2008	Audience Award	Nominated
British Academy Television Awards 2008	Best Special Factual	Won

== Book adaptation ==
A History of Modern Britain is a book written by Marr that coincided with his television documentary series of the same name. It was first published by Macmillan Publishers in 2007.

== See also ==
- Andrew Marr's The Making of Modern Britain
