= Stefano Hatfield =

English journalist and newspaper editor

Stefano Hatfield is a British journalist and newspaper editor. He was born in Croydon and was educated at The John Fisher School and the University of Exeter. He is a Roman Catholic of Italian descent.

Hatfield edited thelondonpaper and Campaign, before his appointment as executive editor of The Independent in 2010 with responsibility for the other national daily in the group, the then new i, In 2013, he left i to become editorial director of the London Live news and current affairs TV station owned by Evgeny Lebedev, also proprietor of The Independent.

Media offices
Preceded by Simon Kelner	Editor of i 2011–2013	Succeeded by Oliver Duff
