= Cedars Upper School =

Location
- Mentmore Road; Leighton Buzzard, Bedfordshire, LU7 2AE; England; 51.907958°N 0.673969°W

Information
- Type: Academy
- Established: 1921
- Department for Education URN: 137462 Tables
- Ofsted: Reports
- Headteacher: Mark Gibbs
- Heads of Schools: Umara Qureshi. Melanie Norman
- Staff: 111
- Gender: Coeducational
- Age: 13 to 18
- Enrolment: 1,033
- Colours: Black, Green, Navy Blue
- Publication: Prospectus
- Website: https://www.cedarsupper.org.uk/

Cedars Upper School is an upper school and sixth form with academy status, located in Leighton Buzzard, Bedfordshire, England. Former students of the school are known as Old Cedarians. The school has a Senior Leadership Team (SLT) and are a part of the Chiltern Learning Trust

== History ==
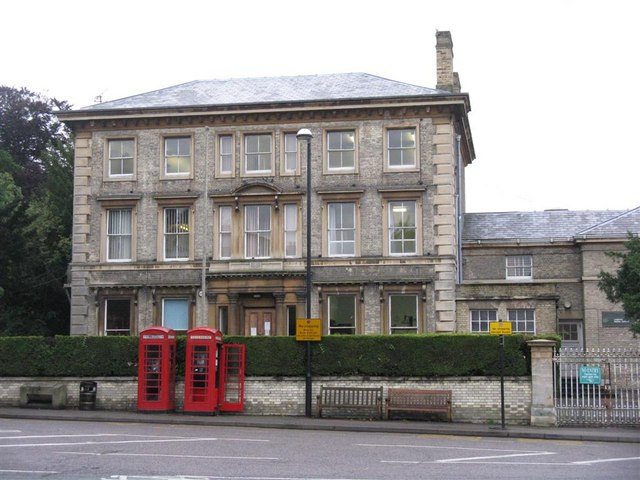
The Cedars, location of the school from 1921 to 1973

Following the Fisher Education Act in 1918, education became compulsory up to the age of 14 by state funded schools. Being an easier option most children stayed at their primary school until aged 14. The Cedars school was founded as a secondary school for boys and girls in 1921 in Church Square, Leighton Buzzard in a house formerly occupied by Mary Norton. The Bedfordshire Times reported "The Cedars School, which has been founded by the Bedfordshire Education Authority, in conjunction with the neighbouring county of Buckingham, to meet the long-felt needs of Leighton Buzzard, Linslade and the surrounding district for secondary education, was formally opened on Thursday by the High Sheriff of Bedfordshire, Mr.R.W.Allen C.B.E." The first headmaster was Fred Fairbrother. (1886–1959) He was a keen rose grower and in retirement became president of the Royal National Rose Society from 1959 to 1960. Acceptance of a pupil to attend the school followed an entrance exam taken at age 11. The brighter children could win a scholarship who were exempt from payment. This divided the school into A and B sides. The scholarship children were put in the A side and those that didn't get a scholarship but passed the entrance exam in the B side. Prior to the Certificate of Education being introduced in 1951 students wishing to go to University passed matriculation examination to matriculate.

== Grammar School ==
Following the Education Act 1944 The Cedars became a grammar school which split secondary education into two tiers. At age eleven pupils finishing their primary education were required to sit the eleven plus. The top 25% went to grammar schools and were taught an academic curriculum intended to prepare them to study academic qualifications at university. The remainder of pupils went to secondary modern schools and were taught a more skills based curriculum intended to fit them for work.

== Comprehensive ==
The Bedfordshire Times states "In 1968 the Secretary of State approved a comprehensive reorganisation of schools In 1973 the school became a comprehensive school. This prompted the school to be re-organised by the Local Education Authority, Bedfordshire County Council. This did away with selection, all pupils attending similar schools, teaching the same curriculum, based solely on age. Children aged 5 to 9 attended lower schools, those aged 9 to 13 went to a middle school and those aged 13 to 18 attended an upper school. The council affirmed its support for the scheme in 1969 and again in 1970 and in 1974 the reorganisation reached the Leighton Buzzard area. The Cedars, therefore, became an Upper School but, as the Church Square premises were too small, moved to new purpose built buildings on the old Cedars playing fields in Linslade in 1973. The old Cedars premises became Leighton Middle School. and moved to its current location on Mentmore Road. Leighton Middle School was founded at the former location."

The school became a specialist Mathematics and Computing College in September 2006, and due to the specialism, the school also became a Microsoft Sponsored School. The school then converted to academy status in September 2011. Since September 2018 the school has become a component of the multi-academy Chiltern Learning Trust.

== Houses ==
The former houses were named after the patron saints of England, Scotland, Ireland and Wales; George, Andrew, Patrick and David, in 2010, the school changed to a vertical tutoring system, having five houses named after rivers; Orinoco, Lena, Danube, Zambezi and Murray, though the Murray house was removed in September 2016.

In September 2019, the vertical tutoring system was removed and replaced with horizontal tutoring, with the houses being replaced by the year groups and upper and lower sixth being combined. Tutor groups are now named after their tutor and year group: For example if tutor named J Smith, tutor group will be known as 11JSM

In September 2024, Head of School Leah Ferguson-Moore joined nearby school Vandyke Upper School as Headteacher.

== Awards ==
- David Heather, 2006, The Guardian regional award for "Teacher of the Year in a Secondary School.

== Alumni ==
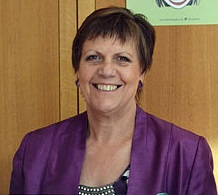
Julie Hilling, Labour MP from 2010 to 2015 for the marginal seat of Bolton West (she won by 92 votes in 2010)

- Ronald Hugh Barker (PhD, BSc(hons), FIET, FInstP ), Physicist and Inventor of Barker code, used for the efficient transmission of data, e.g. radar, space telemetry, digital speech, mobile phone, gps, ultrasound and tracking technologies, etc. Winner of the Allen Prize for Mathematics and Science combined in 1933.
- Helen Boaden, Director of BBC Radio since 2013, Director from 2004 to 2013 of BBC News, Controller from 2000 to 2004 of BBC Radio 4 (also attended school in Ipswich)
- Oliver Duff (British editor), Editor since 2013 of the i (British newspaper).
- John Gadd CBE, Chairman from 1973 to 1977 of the Eastern Gas Board, and from 1977 to 1988 of the North Thames Gas Board
- Jane Griffiths (politician), Labour MP from 1997 to 2005 of Reading East
- Julie Hilling, Labour MP from 2010 to 2015 of Bolton West
- Derek Reid, mycologist
- Martin Shirley CBE FRSB, Director from 2006 to 2010 of the Institute for Animal Health
- Ella Claridge, Cricketer
- Janice Mahoney, Camera person, ITV Studios
