= Helen Boaden =

British former broadcasting executive

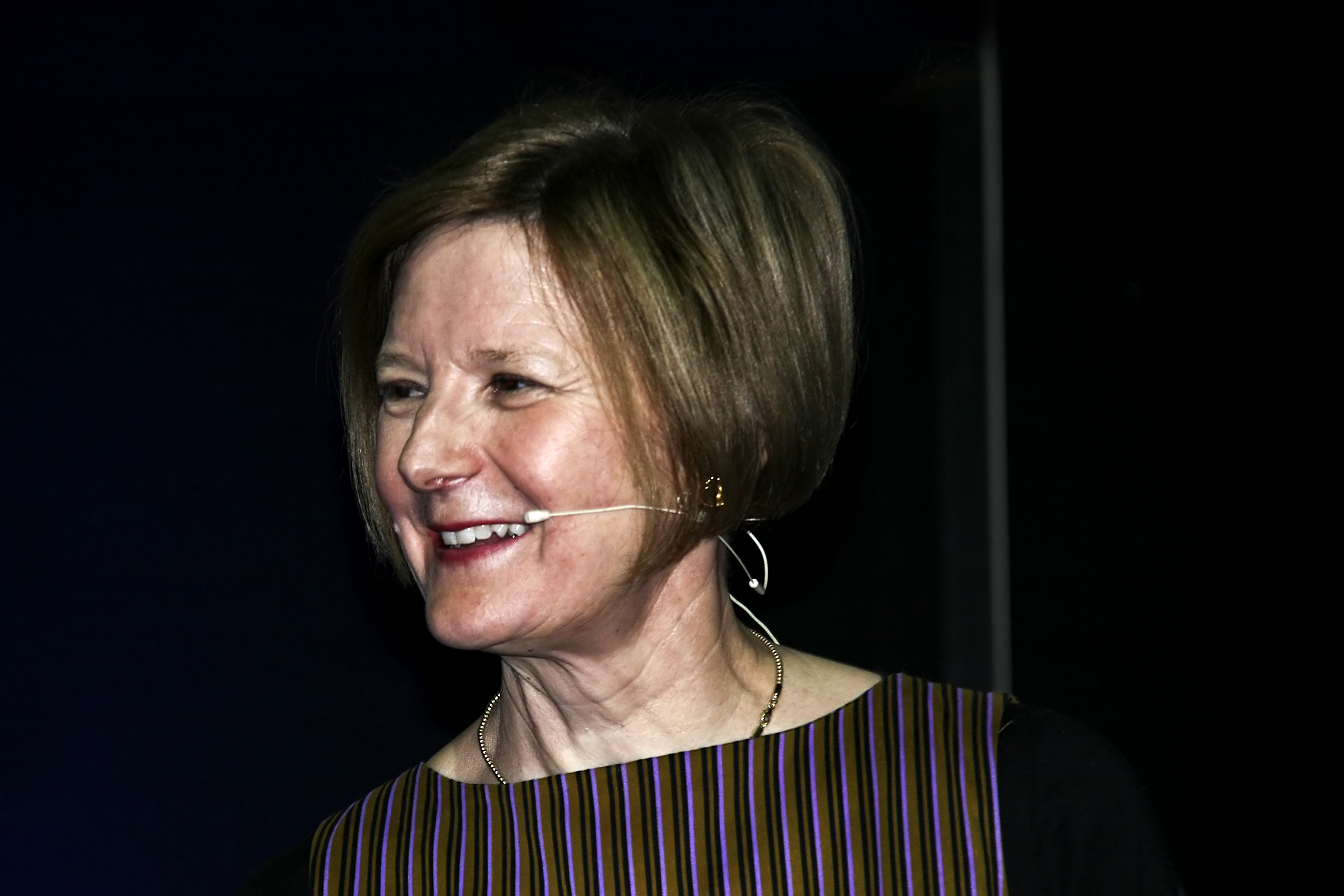
- Boaden in 2015
- Born: 1 March 1956 (age 70); Colchester, Essex, England
- Education: Northgate Grammar School, Suffolk; Cedars Grammar School, Bedfordshire; University of Sussex; Wharton School of the University of Pennsylvania; London College of Printing
- Known for: Director of BBC Radio (2013–2016); Director of BBC News (2004–2013); Controller of BBC7 (2002–2004); Controller of BBC Radio 4 (2000–2004)

Helen Boaden (born 1 March 1956) is a British former broadcasting executive who spent more than 30 years working for the BBC, including as Director of Radio between February 2013 and September 2016.

Boaden is a Fellow of The Radio Academy, and in May 2019 she joined the board of the UK Statistics Authority for a period of three years.

== Early life ==
Boaden was born on 1 March 1956 in Colchester in Essex. Her parents, William Boaden and Barbara Mary Abbott, married in 1954. They lived on Himley Green in Linslade.

Her father was a further education lecturer in geography and then worked for a teaching union. She says that she came "from one of those families where there was quite a lot of shouting and plates whizzing through the air".

Boaden says that she found school "a great relief from home life because it was calm and ordered". She was educated at Rushmere junior school and Northgate Grammar School (now Northgate High School) in the large county town of Ipswich in Suffolk, and at Cedars Grammar School (now Cedars Upper School) in the town of Leighton Buzzard in Bedfordshire, followed by the University of Sussex, where she gained a BA honours degree in English literature, and the Wharton School of the University of Pennsylvania in 1999, where she gained an MBA degree. She revisited the Cedars School in May 2002, and again in May 2003.

== Life and career ==
Boaden began her career in 1978 as a care assistant with disturbed adolescents in the London Borough of Hackney. The following year, she became a journalist with the New York City radio station WBAI. On returning to the UK, she took a course in radio journalism at the London College of Printing (now the London College of Communication). After work at Radio Tees and Radio Aire, Boaden joined the BBC in 1983 as a news producer with Radio Leeds. From there, she joined BBC Radio 4 as a reporter on the File on 4 series, then as its editor from 1991. She worked from the BBC in Manchester as a presenter for Woman's Hour and later presented other documentaries for Radio 4, and for the Brass Tacks investigative programme on BBC 2.

In 1997, Boaden became the BBC's Head of Business Programmes, then in 1998 Head of BBC Current Affairs – the first woman to hold this position. She was Controller of BBC Radio 4 from March 2000 until 20 September 2004, superseded by Mark Damazer. She became Controller of BBC7 in 2002, when the station was launched. In 2004, she succeeded Richard Sambrook as Director of BBC News.

Boaden received criticism following the 7 July terror attacks in London when she issued a memo instructing BBC staff not to refer to the perpetrators as terrorists, arguing that the term "can be a barrier rather than aid to understanding". Former BBC reporter Martin Bell was one of those who condemned the memo, accusing the BBC of being "overcautious" and noting that the attackers seemed to meet the definition of terrorists. Writing in The Spectator, Michael Vestey suggested "it's almost as if the BBC is afraid of offending suicide bombers in the Muslim world".

In December 2012, Boaden was asked to temporarily step down from her position as the Director of BBC News while the BBC awaited the results of Operation Yewtree, a wide-ranging police investigation of sexual abuse, primarily of children, by former BBC presenter Jimmy Savile (who died in 2011) and others. A second and parallel investigation, launched by the BBC into possible management failings at the corporation, called the 'Pollard Report' after the lead investigator, Nick Pollard (a former senior executive at Sky News), criticised the BBC and several executive members for continuing with plans to celebrate Savile's life, despite apparently having received advance information that Savile was being investigated for multiple cases of sexual abuse. The report explicitly criticised Boaden for having handled the matter too casually. Boaden returned to her position later the same month.

In February 2013, Boaden was appointed director of radio by incoming director-general Tony Hall. This was widely seen as a demotion. After a period with Fran Unsworth in her former post, James Harding became Director of BBC News later in 2013. Boaden resigned from the BBC in September 2016.

She is a Fellow of The Radio Academy.

In May 2019, she joined the board of the UK Statistics Authority for a period of three years.

== Awards ==
Boaden has won Sony Awards for a programme on AIDS in Africa, and bullying in Feltham Young Offenders Institution when at File on 4. Radio 4 won the Gold Award for Station of the Year in 2003 and 2004. In 1990, Boaden won awards from the Industrial Society for her work on safety standards in the oil industry. She has honorary degrees from Suffolk College, the University of Sussex, and the University of York. She is on the committee of the Sony Radio Academy. In February 2013, she was named as one of the 100 most powerful women in the United Kingdom by Woman's Hour on BBC Radio 4.

== Personal life ==
Boaden is married and owns a home in Scarborough. Her husband is a newspaper journalist.
