= Lucy Rock =

British newspaper editor

Lucy Rock is a British newspaper editor.

Rock studied at Magdalen College, Oxford, matriculating in 1988. She became a journalist, and worked in various positions at the Daily Mirror, then became deputy news editor at the Daily Express. In 2004, she was appointed as news editor at The Observer, serving until 2015. In 2015, she relocated to Seattle, writing for both The Observer and The Guardian. She returned to the UK in 2018, and was appointed as deputy editor of The Observer. In December 2024, the newspaper was sold to Tortoise Media, which appointed Rock as editor of the print edition. She became the first female editor of The Observer since Rachel Beer, more than a century earlier. In September 2025, she retired.

Media offices
Preceded by Paul Webster	Deputy Editor of The Observer; 2018–2024	Succeeded by Post vacant
Preceded by Paul Webster	Editor of The Observer; 2024–present	Succeeded by Incumbent
