= John Mullin (journalist) =

British newspaper editor (born 1963)

John Mullin (born 22 March 1963) is a British newspaper editor, who has been Consultant Editor (News) at the Daily Mail since 2020. He was formerly deputy head of sport at The Telegraph Media Group, and was BBC Scotland's referendum editor during the independence campaign in 2013-2014. He was editor of The Independent on Sunday for six years; executive editor on The Independent for four; and deputy editor of The Scotsman for two years until 2003.

== Life and career ==
Mullin was born in Bellshill. He was educated at Hutchesons' Grammar School, the University of Glasgow (where he was editor of the Glasgow University Guardian), and City University in London. His first paid job in journalism was at the Western Morning News, then in 1987 he became a business reporter at The Independent. He moved to The Guardian, where he worked for ten years, latterly as Ireland correspondent, before his appointment in 2000 as Deputy Editor of The Scotsman. He returned to The Independent in 2003 as Executive Editor, and was appointed as Editor of The Independent on Sunday in 2008.

His departure as editor of The Independent on Sunday was announced in February 2013, and he was replaced in April by Lisa Markwell.

He is played by Alec Newman in the 2025 ITV drama about the News International phone hacking scandal, The Hack.

Media offices
Preceded by Tristan Davies	Editor of The Independent on Sunday; 2008 - 2013	Succeeded by Lisa Markwell
