= Indy100 =

British news website

indy100

- Screenshot of indy100 taken on 25 April 2026
- Former name: i100
- Website type: News website
- Available in: English
- Headquarters: London, {{{location_country}}}
- Owner: ESI Media
- Key people: Christian Broughton
- Website: www.indy100.com
- Users: 1.3 million (2024)
- Launched: 17 July 2014; 12 years ago
- Current status: Active
- OCLC number: 1235831146

indy100 (formerly i100) is a British news website affiliated with The Independent, launched by ESI Media on 17 July 2014. The site is led by journalist Christian Broughton.

== History ==
On 17 July 2014, ESI Media, publisher of The Independent announced the launch of news website i100.co.uk – as on online companion for their i newspaper – describing it as a "not just another newspaper website". Users of the website can sign up using one of several social media accounts to leave comments and upvote articles. Users can receive rewards for upvoting or sharing a certain number of articles. The site republishes material from The Independent (and formerly the i newspaper) and rewrites it in a "digital-friendly" format. The site's editorial team consists of journalists and contributors from The Independent, and is led by managing director Christian Broughton. The website's content is aimed at millennials, it seeks to hire editors who resonate with Gen Z readers.

In February 2016, Evgeny Lebedev announced The Independent was moving to digital-only model and that the i newspaper would be sold to Johnston Press. The Independent would retain the i100 website, which would rebrand as indy100. Johnston Press also announced that the i newspaper would create its own news website, inews.co.uk.

In 2024, The Independent estimated that indy100 had 1.3 million monthly readers.

== Reception ==
In 2014, The Guardian described the website as a "digital incarnation of The Independent's sister title, i". Marketing Week likened the website to Buzzfeed. In 2016, Evgeny Lebedev said that the website was "hugely successful". InPublishing described the website as a "hugely successful quality news source for millennials". In 2017, Amol Rajan – media editor of BBC News and former editor of The Independent – described the website as the "most successful spin-off site of its kind", adding that it created "mobile-friendly, ultra-social, video-heavy content that young audiences lapped up."
