= Christian Broughton =

British journalist

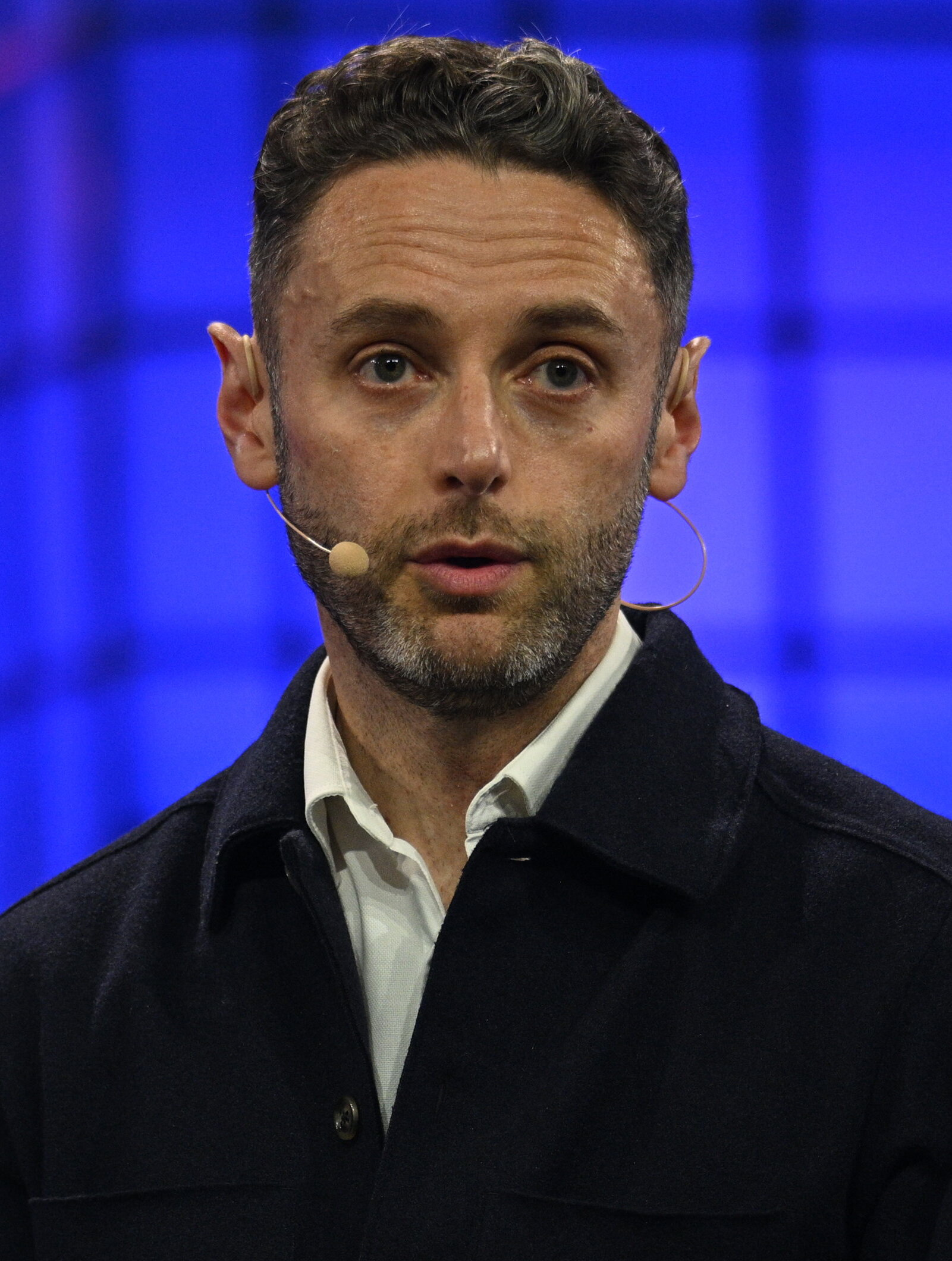
- Broughton in 2024
- Education: King's College, London
- Occupation: Managing Director
- Employer: The Independent

Christian Broughton is a British journalist. He has been the managing director of The Independent since October 2020. Previously he was the editor of the newspaper between 2016 and 2020.

== Career ==
Broughton was sports editor at The Independent between 2009 and 2010. He was appointed as assistant editor through the London Olympics, before he was promoted to digital editor in 2012 and later that year launched the sister website, indy100. He remained as digital editor after The Independent became online-only in 2016. Broughton became editor of the newspaper in 2016 and was promoted to managing director in October 2020.

Under his stewardship, the digital edition doubled the previous print number of subscribers to the paper, while The Independent again became profitable. The Independent reportedly commanded a daily readership of six million unique visitors to the website in 2018.

== Personal life ==
Broughton is married with three children.
