= Britain from Above =

- Starring: Andrew Marr
- Narrated by: Andrew Marr
- Country of origin: United Kingdom
- Original language: English
- No. of series: 1
- No. of episodes: 6

Production
- Executive producer: Nick Catliff
- Production location: UK
- Running time: 30 / 60 mins

Original release
- Network: BBC One; BBC Two; BBC Four; BBC HD
- Release: 10 August – 24 August 2008

Britain From Above is a 2008 six-part British television miniseries in which journalist Andrew Marr takes to the skies over Britain to research aspects of past and present British life and the interconnections that make Britain what it is today. The series is described by the BBC as "An epic journey revealing the secrets, patterns and hidden rhythms of our lives from a striking new perspective". According to the BBC, "Cutting edge technology allows you to see through cloud cover, navigate the landscape and witness familiar sights as never seen before."

The series was filmed in High Definition and aired on BBC One, Two and Four for three weeks starting 10 August 2008 and is repeated regularly. The official website features all the films from the programmes, exclusive material including Rewinds through time at 16 different locations, Rough Cuts of magic moments and Behind the Scenes. The site also shows aerial images by photographer Jason Hawkes.

== Episode list ==
#	Title	Subject	Airdate	Running time
1	24 Hour Britain	Andrew Marr goes on a journey through a day in the life of Britain as seen from the skies.	10 August 2008	60 mins
2	The City	Comparing exhaustive footage of London in the 40s with the city of today.	10 August 2008	30 mins
3	Man Made Britain	Andrew Marr discovers how some of Britain's greenest landscapes were shaped by humans	17 August 2008	60 mins
4	The Land	Comparing exhaustive footage of East Anglia in the 1940s with the countryside of today.	17 August 2008	30 mins
5	Untamed Britain	Andrew Marr microlights and paraglides to get a bird's eye view of our untamed landscape.	24 August 2008	60 mins
6	The Industrial Landscape	Comparing footage of Britain's industrial landscape in the 1940s with today.	24 August 2008	30 mins
