= Tristan Davies =

British newspaper editor

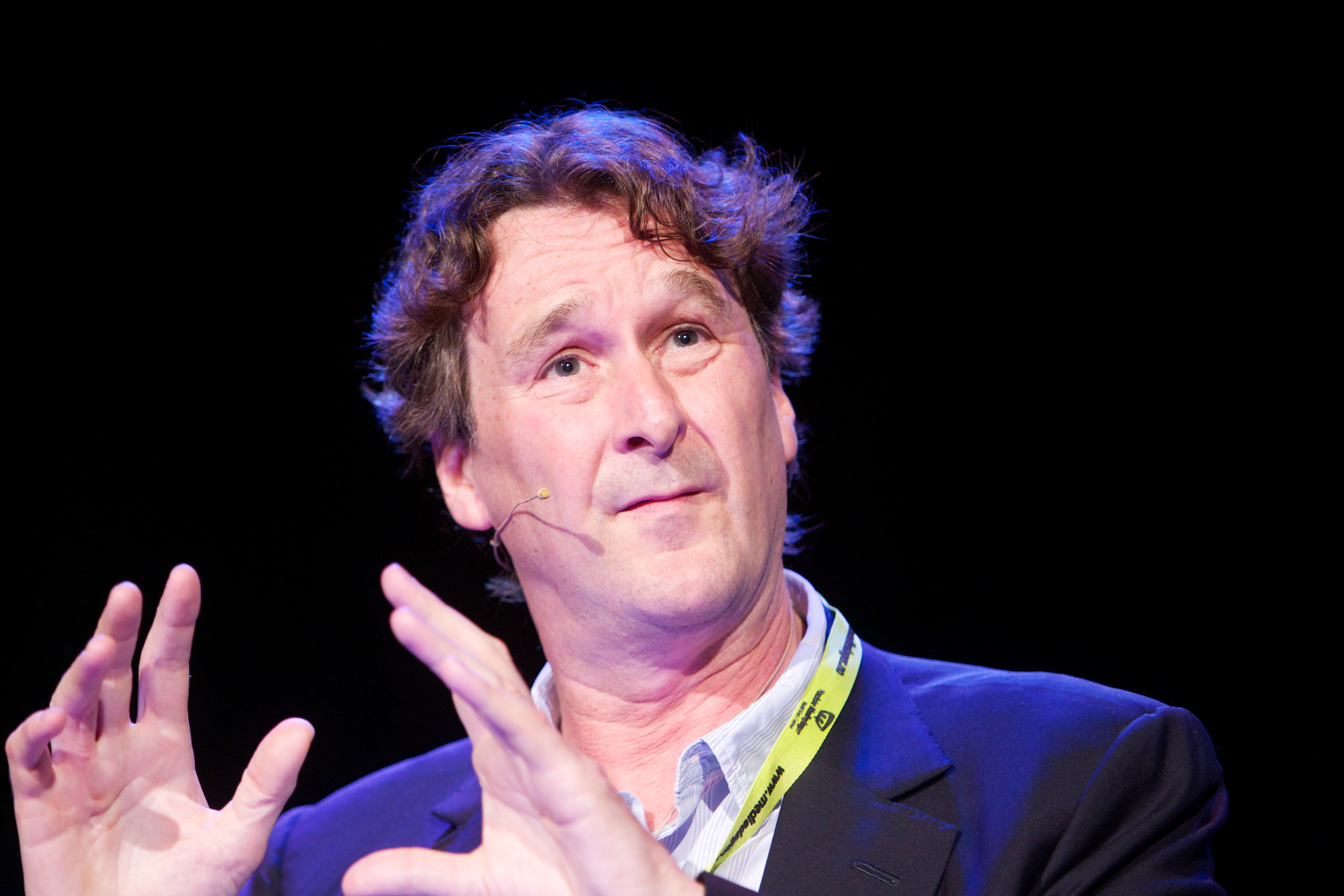
- Tristan Davies - Bergen 2011
- Education: Douai School; University of Bristol
- Occupations: newspaper executive and editor
- Employer(s): The Independent; The Mail on Sunday; Independent on Sunday; The Sunday Times

Tristan Davies is a British newspaper executive and former newspaper editor.

Davies was educated at Douai School in Woolhampton. He studied at the University of Bristol, then trained in radio journalism, but took employment for a London newspaper. He joined The Independent in 1986, soon after its launch. He initially worked on the listings section, then took various posts in arts and features. He left in the mid-1990s, to spend two years working on The Mail on Sunday's Night & Day magazine.

Davies returned to The Independent in 1998, and became editor of the Independent on Sunday in 2001 in succession to Janet Street-Porter. In 2005, he oversaw a change in format from broadsheet to tabloid, while in June 2007, he oversaw a major redesign, which saw the paper reduced to a single section, plus a magazine. He remained editor until January 2008, becoming the longest-serving editor of the Independent on Sunday. The Guardian suggested that he had resigned as he was unhappy with budget cuts imposed on the newspaper.

In February 2008, Davies became executive editor of The Sunday Times with special responsibility for design, and was launch editor of the paper’s website and digital editions.

Davies rejoined The Mail on Sunday as assistant editor in 2012, and was appointed deputy editor in August 2016, taking office that September.

Media offices
Preceded by Janet Street-Porter	Editor of the Independent on Sunday; 2001–2007	Succeeded by John Mullin
Preceded by Gerard Greaves	Deputy Editor of The Mail on Sunday; 2016–present With: Tobyn Andreae	Succeeded by Incumbent
