= Lewis Doxat =

English newspaper editor

- Born: 1778; Calcutta, India
- Died: 4 March 1871 (aged 92–93); London, England
- Occupations: Editor of The Observer; Morning Chronicle

Lewis Doxat (1778, Calcutta, India – 4 March 1871, London, England) was an English newspaper editor.

== Biography ==
Born in India, Doxat came to England as a young boy. He settled in London, where he found work at The Morning Chronicle. In 1804, he started an association with The Observer and rose to become its editor three years later. He would serve as the editor of the Sunday weekly for the next fifty years. As editor, Doxat played more of a managerial role than a journalistic one, and proudly claimed that he never penned "an article on any subject under any circumstances whatsoever." During his time, he introduced new typography and pioneered the use of woodcuts to illustrate articles. Such innovations ensured the newspaper's commercial success, though not without controversy, as some felt that the use of woodcuts to illustrate its coverage of the Radlett murder exceeded the bounds of propriety. The paper also got into trouble with the crown when it defied a government ban on reporting proceedings against the Cato Street conspirators, who planned to kill off members of parliament.

When the owner of The Observer, William Innell Clement, purchased The Morning Chronicle in 1821, he installed Doxat as the newspaper's manager. Doxat served in both positions simultaneously for the next thirteen years, returning exclusively to his duties with The Observer when Clement sold the Morning Chronicle in 1834. Doxat continued to edit The Observer, which during this time developed a reputation for exclusive information on contemporary politics, until his retirement in 1857.

Media offices
Preceded by W. S. Bourne	Editor of The Observer; 1807–1857	Succeeded by Joseph Snowe
