= Andrew Marr's The Making of Modern Britain =

2009 British television documentary series

- Genre: Documentary
- Written by: Andrew Marr
- Directed by: Robin Dashwood (1,3); Fatima Salaria (2,4); Francis Whately (5); Roger Parsons (6)
- Presented by: Andrew Marr
- Composers: Robert and Peter Hartshorne
- Country of origin: United Kingdom
- Original language: English
- No. of series: 1
- No. of episodes: 6

Production
- Executive producer: Dominic Crossley-Holland
- Producers: Chris Granlund (series); Robin Dashwood (1,3); Fatima Salaria (2,4); Francis Whately (5); Roger Parsons (6)
- Cinematography: Neil Harvey
- Running time: 59 mins
- Production company: BBC production

Original release
- Network: BBC Two
- Release: 28 October – 2 December 2009

Andrew Marr's The Making of Modern Britain is a 2009 BBC documentary television series presented by Andrew Marr that covers the period of British history from the death of Queen Victoria to the end of the Second World War. It was a follow-up to his 2007 series Andrew Marr's History of Modern Britain.

== Episodes ==
=== A New Dawn ===
Marr begins the series with the death of Queen Victoria and the Boer War. The population was "enjoying the bawdy pleasures of music hall", leading to concerns over the "physical and moral strength" of the working class. He describes the power struggles between David Lloyd George and Joseph Chamberlain, the women's suffrage movement, and the day on which Mr Rolls met Mr Royce.

=== Road to War ===
The suffragette campaign becomes violent and independence for Ireland is proposed, while dockers and miners go on strike for improved conditions and wages, and the popular press raise fears of a German invasion. As a result, Liberal Chancellor, David Lloyd George, faced the dilemma of pensions or battleships. Marr also describes technological advances such as aviation and cinema, with future Hollywood stars Charlie Chaplin and Stan Laurel touring together across Britain. The assassination of Archduke Franz Ferdinand in Sarajevo precipitates war, and Lloyd George is now in political conflict with his former ally, Winston Churchill.

=== The Great War ===
Dealing with World War I and its effects, Marr focuses on Lord Kitchener and his volunteer army and German gun-boat attacks on the north-east coast of England. Meanwhile, John Fisher, First Sea Lord disappears in strange circumstances and a sex scandal threatens the British establishment. In Belgium, Marr visits trenches of Flanders and describes the terrible conditions and gallows humour that prevailed. Back in Britain people worked tirelessly for the war effort.

=== Having a Ball ===
Following the war, Lloyd George promises "Homes Fit For Heroes", leading to a housing boom; it is the birth of radio broadcasting and the BBC is born. Michael Collins negotiates with Lloyd George over Ireland, leading to the founding of an Irish Free State; Ireland would have her own government but would remain within the British Commonwealth, this disappointing result led to the civil war. Lloyd George is involved in a cash-for-honours scandal. The 1926 General Strike and the Wall Street crash make the future of Britain uncertain.

=== Little Britain ===
The Wall Street Crash had repercussions for Britain and a national financial crisis ensued. Solutions were offered by the Greenshirts and Blackshirts, the latter led by Oswald Mosley. The rise of fascism in Europe was largely ignored while Britons enjoyed Gracie Fields's singing and the novelty of Butlins holiday camps. House building continued into "Metroland", providing mock Tudor homes for the new commuter class.

=== Britannia at Bay ===
Marr tells the story of Second World War, beginning with the defeat at Dunkirk that would become the model for the "national spirit"- everyone collaborating in whatever way they could in order to defeat Hitler. In 1940, only Britain, led by Churchill, stood against the German forces, and Churchill's rallying speeches typified "the Blitz spirit" while a Nazi invasion seemed unavoidable. The Home Guard was quickly formed, and the privations of wartime led to innovation and cooperation in novel ways.
