= Andrew Marr's History of the World =

2012 British television documentary series

- Genre: Documentary
- Written by: Andrew Marr
- Directed by: Neil Rawles (1,2); Renny Bartlett (3,4,5); Mark Radice (4); Robin Dashwood (6,7); Guy Smith (8)
- Presented by: Andrew Marr
- Composers: Robert and Peter Hartshorne
- Country of origin: United Kingdom
- Original language: English
- No. of series: 1
- No. of episodes: 8

Production
- Executive producer: Chris Granlund
- Producers: Kathryn Taylor (series); Neil Rawles (1,2); Renny Bartlett (3,4,5); Mark Radice (4); Robin Dashwood (6,7); Guy Smith (8)
- Production company: BBC/Discovery Channel/Open University Co-Production

Original release
- Network: BBC One
- Release: 23 September – 11 November 2012

Andrew Marr's History of the World is a 2012 BBC documentary television series presented by Andrew Marr that covers 70,000 years of world history from before the beginning of human civilisation, as African nomadic peoples spread out around the world and settled down to become the first farmers, up to the twentieth century, in June 1998.

The series is noted for its elaborate, Hollywood-like recreations of many of the people and events on which Marr frames his story. Great care was taken in accurate costumes and the use of the original language of those portrayed. To this are added elaborate digital effects, such as a recreation of the Palace of Knossos or the diversionary channels dug to control flooding of the Yellow River.

== Episodes ==
No.	Title	Original release date	UK viewers (millions)
1	"Survival"	23 September 2012	3.85
How the earliest humans spread around the world, adapting and surviving against the odds. Segments: anatomically modern humans leaving Africa 70,000 years ago; modern human and neanderthal contact in Europe 40,000 years ago; invention of the needle 30,000 years ago; cave painting in Europe 27,000 years ago; the agricultural revolution in Mesopotamia 12,000 years ago; Çatalhöyük 9,000 years ago; Yu the Great controlling the Yellow River in China 4,000 years ago; community life in ancient Egypt 3,200 years ago; a Minoan sacrifice at Knossos 3,700 years ago.
2	"Age of Empire"	30 September 2012	2.54
The story of the first empires which laid the foundations for the modern world. Segments: the reign of Sennacherib in the Assyrian Empire 701 BC; Phoenicians and the development of the alphabet 1050 BC; Cyrus the Great against the Lydians at Sardis 547 BC; the liberation of the Jewish people 539 BC; the life of Siddhārtha Gautama 5th century BC; development of democracy at Athens 5th century BC; the Battle of Marathon 490 BC; origins of Confucianism in Zhou dynasty China 500 BC; the conquests of Alexander the Great 336 BC; the teachings and death of Socrates 399 BC.
3	"The Word and the Sword"	7 October 2012	2.37
Charting the spiritual revolutions that shook the world between 300 BC and 700 AD. Segments: Ashoka and the rise of India's Maurya dynasty 295 BC; the rule of Ying Zheng and origin of the Qin dynasty 3rd century BC; Cleopatra and Julius Caesar at Alexandria 44 BC; Caesar's assassination 44 BC; the Fall of Cleopatra 30 BC; the spread of Christianity by Paul 30 AD; Christian martyrdom of Perpetua in Carthage 203 AD; Constantine the Great embraces Christianity 337 AD; The Year Without Sunshine 535–536 AD; the decline of the Nazca 200–600 AD; Bilal at Mecca and the spread of Islam 620 AD.
4	"Into the Light"	14 October 2012	2.6
The Middle Ages, when Vikings explored and pillaged. Segments: a Viking raid on Kiev and the foundation of the Kievan Rus' 882 AD; Vladimir the Great converts to Orthodox Christianity 898 AD; al-Khwarizmi and the Islamic Golden Age 827 AD; Caliphate of Córdoba 929–1031; Genghis Khan and the rise of the Mongol Empire 1206; Mongol conquest of the Khwarazmian Empire 1219–1221; the journey of Marco Polo 1271–1298; the Black Death 1347; the pilgrimage of Mansa Musa 1324; the Ottoman siege of Constantinople 1453; Leonardo da Vinci painting The Last Supper 1494.
5	"Age of Plunder"	21 October 2012	2.33
Europe's rise from piracy to private enterprise. Segments: Christopher Columbus landing in the Caribbean 1492; Hernán Cortés conquering the Aztecs 1521; Martin Luther and the Protestant Reformation 1517; European wars of religion 1524; the Spanish capture of Atahualpa 1532; Ivan the Terrible and the conquest of Siberia 1580; William Adams and Tokugawa Ieyasu in Japan 1600; Nathaniel Courthope vs. the Dutch on Run island 1617; tulip mania and the rise of capitalism in Holland 1637.
6	"Revolution"	28 October 2012	N/A
A time when people worldwide rose up in the name of freedom and equality. Segments: Galileo Galilei and his telescope 1609; Galileo and the Inquisition 1633; Mughal India and the construction of the Taj Mahal 1657; the reign of Aurangzeb 1658–1707; the American Revolution and the Boston Tea Party 1773–1781; the French Revolution and the execution of Louis XVI 1789–1793; the rise of Napoleon 1799–1804; the British settlement of Australia 1788; the Atlantic Slave Trade and the Haitian Revolution 1791; Edward Jenner and the development of the smallpox vaccine 1796.
7	"Age of Industry"	4 November 2012	N/A
How Britain's Industrial Revolution created the modern world. Segments: George Stephenson and the construction of the steam locomotive 1825; the Opium Wars in China 1839–1860; serfdom and Leo Tolstoy in Russia 1853; Abraham Lincoln and the Civil War 1860–1865; Commodore Perry in Japan 1854; the end of the Samurai and the development of modern Japan 1877; Henry Morton Stanley exploring the Congo 1874; Leopold II and the Scramble for Africa 1881–1914; the First World War and Arthur Zimmermann 1914–1918; the Russian Revolution 1917.
8	"Age of Extremes"	11 November 2012	N/A
The atom bomb and other developments in the twentieth century – our age Segments: Adolf Hitler and the rise of Nazi Germany 1918–1933; Margaret Sanger and the first birth control clinic 1916; Margaret Sanger and the birth control movement 1921–1960; Mahatma Gandhi and Edward Wood in India 1930; the Holocaust 1941–1945; Robert Oppenheimer and the bombing of Hiroshima 1945; Post–World War II economic expansion 1945–1973; Apollo 11 1969; Deng Xiaoping and the end of Mao Zedong's China in 1967–1976; the collapse of the Berlin Wall 1989–1990; Deep Blue vs. Garry Kasparov 1997; the Ayoreo tribe and environmental issues in Brazil 1998.

== Production ==
Producer Robin Dashwood on the BBC website provides background to how the series was made, beginning with financial limitations on travel which set them seeking one location "which would furnish us the whole world":

We found the answer in Cape Town, South Africa. Not only does it have a highly-skilled film infrastructure in place, they have a plethora of fantastic locations, all within close proximity of the city centre. When the three directors and the series producer arrived, we were astonished by what we found. With some skillful set dressing, Cape Town's Cathedral became Notre Dame and Wittenberg Cathedrals, while a car park in front of the Town Hall became revolutionary Paris; stunning beaches stood in for Australia and the Caribbean; sand dunes became the Middle East; and forests became, well, forests from every continent. Most surprisingly, a young offenders' institution became a 19th century Chinese street, complete with circling baboons.

Dashwood also notes the diversity of actors available: "Luckily Cape Town is a bit of a melting pot: African, Chinese, European, Middle Eastern you name it, they've got it [except Aborigines]." Though crowds are often shown, this was done with the help of computers: "Budgetary considerations meant we had to make a limited number of performers seem like many more – a crowd of 15 often had to stand in for a crowd of 1500. The magic of computer graphics often filled in the missing 1485 – but it was always a challenge."

== Book ==
- Marr, Andrew (2014). A History of the World. Pan Macmillan. ISBN 978-1447236825.
