= Simon Kelner =

British journalist and newspaper editor (born 1957)

Simon Kelner (born 9 December 1957) is a British journalist and newspaper editor.

Kelner studied at Bury Grammar School. His older brother is the journalist and broadcaster Martin Kelner. He is Jewish. He started work at Neath Guardian in 1976. In 1980 he moved on to the Kent Evening Post. He became assistant sports editor of The Observer in 1983. He became deputy sports editor of The Independent in 1986. In 1989 he worked on the Observer magazine and then became Daily Mail magazine editor.

Kelner was editor-in-chief of The Independent and Independent on Sunday newspapers from May 1998 to 2008, succeeding Andrew Marr and Rosie Boycott. After a stint as managing director of The Independent titles he was re-appointed editor in April 2010 by the new owner, Alexander Lebedev. Kelner won several awards during his employment at The Independent, including Editor of the Year in 2004 and 2010.

Media offices
Preceded by Rosie Boycott and Andrew Marr	Editor of The Independent; 1998–2008	Succeeded by Roger Alton
Preceded by Roger Alton	Editor of The Independent; 2010–2011	Succeeded by Chris Blackhurst
Preceded by New position	Editor of i 2010–2011	Succeeded by Stefano Hatfield
