= Will Hutton =

English journalist (born 1950)

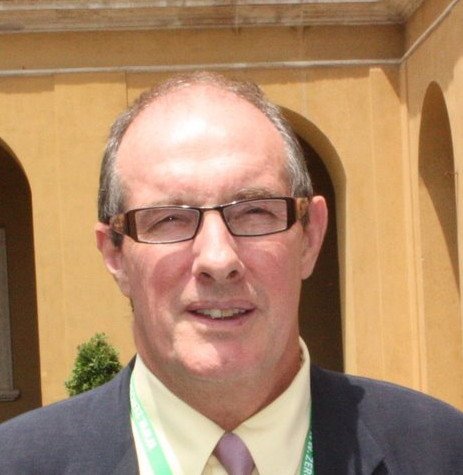
- Hutton in 2008
- Born: William Nicolas Hutton; 21 May 1950 (age 76); Woolwich, London, England

Academic background
- Education: University of Bristol, INSEAD

William Nicolas Hutton (born 21 May 1950) is an English journalist. As of 2022, he writes a regular column for The Observer, co-chairs the Purposeful Company, and is the president-designate of the Academy of Social Sciences. He is the chair of the advisory board of the UK National Youth Corps. He was principal of Hertford College, University of Oxford from 2011 to 2020, and co-founder of the Big Innovation Centre, an initiative from the Work Foundation (formerly the Industrial Society), having been chief executive of the Work Foundation from 2000 to 2008. He was formerly editor-in-chief of The Observer.

== Early life ==
Although born in Woolwich, where his father had worked at the Royal Ordnance factory (Royal Arsenal), Hutton began his education in Scotland. He went to Bishopton Primary School in Bishopton, Renfrewshire, then Paisley Grammar School when he was eight. His father moved to Bromley, then to Kent, and he attended Southborough Lane County Primary School in Petts Wood.

Hutton studied at Chislehurst and Sidcup Grammar School in Sidcup, where he was introduced to A level economics by a teacher, Garth Pinkney. He only got average marks at O-level but enjoyed the sixth form more, studying geography, history, and economics. He also organised the school tennis team. After studying sociology and economics at the University of Bristol, gaining a BSocSc (2.1), he started his career as an equity salesman for a brokerage firm, before leaving to study for an MBA at INSEAD at Fontainebleau near Paris.

== Career ==
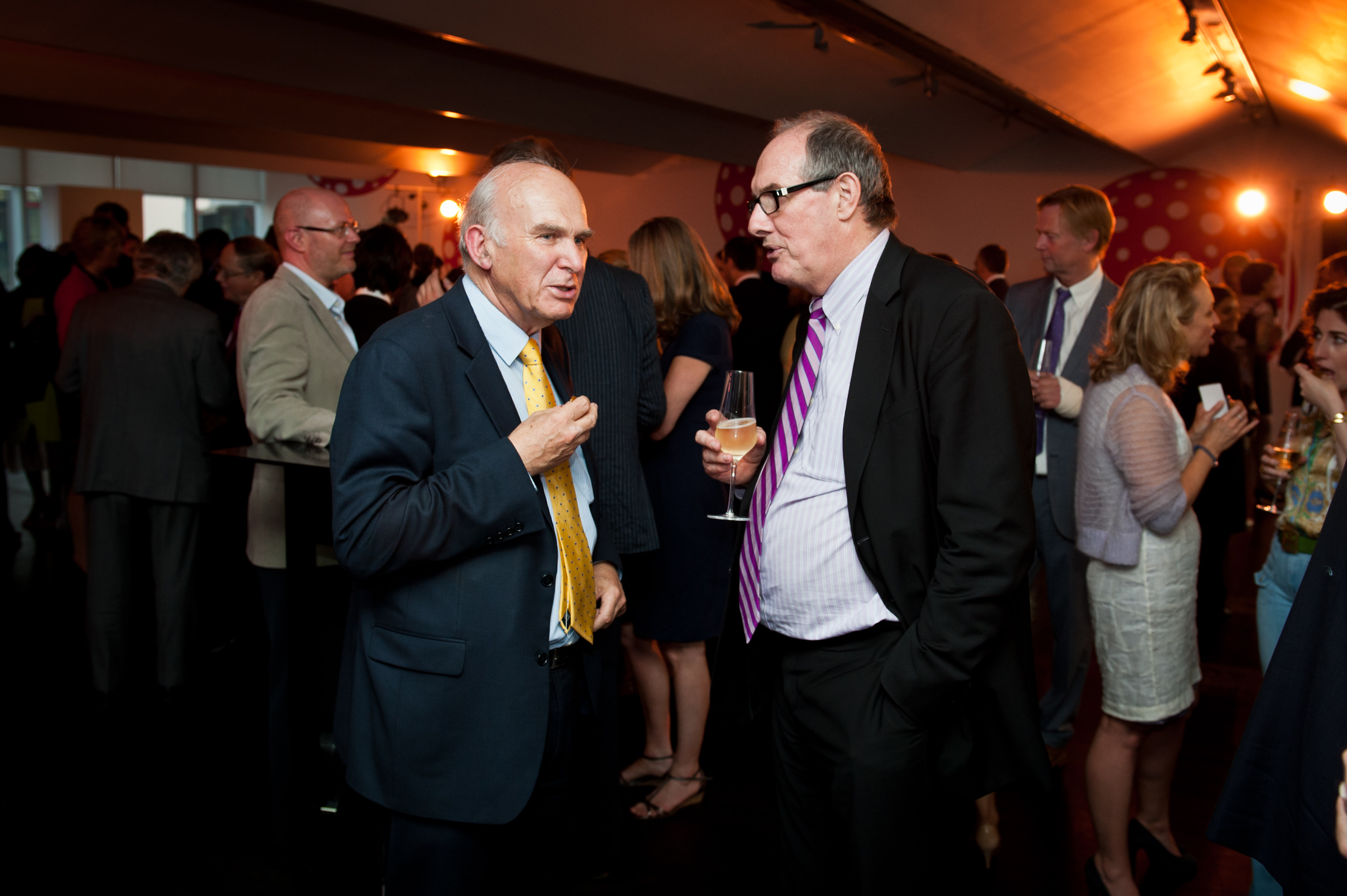
Hutton (right) with Vince Cable in 2013

Hutton moved on to work in television and radio. He spent ten years with the BBC, including working as economics correspondent for Newsnight from 1983 to 1988, where he replaced Peter Hobday. He spent four years as editor-in-chief at The Observer and director of the Guardian National Newspapers, before joining the Industrial Society, now known as The Work Foundation, as chief executive in 2000. In 2010, he was criticised for his handling of the Industrial Society by a number of publications, including The Sunday Times and Private Eye, for having used the company for campaigning purposes rather than focusing on it as a business enterprise. Under Hutton's management, The Work Foundation became insolvent and was wound up. It was then sold to Lancaster University.

As well as a columnist, author, and chief executive, Hutton is a governor of the London School of Economics, a visiting professor at the University of Manchester Business School and the University of Bristol, a visiting fellow at Mansfield College, Oxford, a shareholder of the Scott Trust Limited, which owns the Guardian Media Group, rapporteur of the Kok Group, and a member of the Design Council's Millennium Commission. In March 2011, he was appointed as Principal of Hertford College, Oxford, taking up the post later in the year and retiring in 2020. He sits on the European Advisory Board of Princeton University Press.

== Writing ==
As an author, Hutton's best-known and most influential works are The State We're In (an economic and political look at Britain in the 1990s from a social democratic point of view) and The World We're In, in which he expands his focus to include the relationship between the United States and Europe, emphasising cultural and social differences between the two blocs and analysing the UK as sitting between the two. In The World We're In, Hutton argues that many viewpoints in this book are neo-Keynesian and that it is critical of short-termism, viewing stakeholder capitalism as an alternative.

Hutton's book The Writing on the Wall was released in the UK in January 2007. The book examines Western concerns and responses to the rise of China and the emerging global division of labour, and argues that the Chinese economy is running up against a set of increasingly unsustainable contradictions that could have a damaging universal fallout. On 18 February 2007, Hutton was a featured guest on BBC's Have Your Say programme, discussing the implications of China's growth. The analysis in his books is characterised by a support for the European Union and its potential, alongside a disdain for what he calls American conservatism —defined, among other factors, as a certain attitude to markets, property, and the social contract. In 1992, he won the What the Papers Say award for Political Journalist of the Year. In 2003, he was made an honorary Doctor of Laws (LLD) by the University of Bristol.

In 2010, he published Them and Us: Changing Britain – Why We Need a Fair Society.

His latest book, How Good We Can Be: Ending the Mercenary Society and Building a Great Country, was published in 2015.

== Personal life ==
Hutton married Jane Atkinson, the daughter of a neurosurgeon, in 1978, and lives in London. They have two daughters and a son. His wife, who died in 2016, was a director of a property development company called First Premise, based in Richmond upon Thames, which she founded in 1987. Hutton calls himself an agnostic.

== Bibliography ==
=== Major works ===
- The Revolution That Never Was: An Assessment of Keynesian Economics (1986) ISBN 0-582-29603-X
- The State We're In: Why Britain Is in Crisis and How to Overcome It (1995) ISBN 0-224-03688-2
- The State to Come (1997) ISBN 0-09-977881-5
- The Stakeholding Society: Writings on Politics and Economics (1998) ISBN 0-7456-2078-7
- Global Capitalism (2000) Will Hutton (editor), Anthony Giddens (editor) ISBN 1-56584-648-6
- On the Edge: Essays on a Runaway World (2000) Anthony Giddens (editor), Will Hutton (editor) ISBN 0-224-05937-8
- The World We're In (2002) ISBN 0-316-85871-4
- A Declaration of Interdependence: Why America Should Join the World (W.W. Norton & Company, 2003) ISBN 0-393-05725-9
- The Writing on the Wall: China and the West in the 21st Century (2007) ISBN 978-0-316-73018-1
- Them and Us: Changing Britain – Why We Need a Fair Society (2010) ISBN 978-1-4087-0151-5
- How Good We Can Be: Ending the Mercenary Society and Building a Great Country (2015) ISBN 978-1408705315
- This Time No Mistakes: How to Remake Britain (2024) ISBN 978-1804549391

=== Contributions to other books ===
- Trust: From Socrates to Spin (2004) Kieron O'Hara, Will Hutton (introduction) ISBN 1-84046-531-X
- Hutton, Will (1997). "The Scene Shifts, the Legacy Remains". In Goodman, Geoffrey (ed.). The State of the Nation: The Political Legacy of Aneurin Bevan. London: Gollancz. pp. 226–232. ISBN 0-575-06308-4.

== Awards and honours ==
- 1996: Honorary Doctor of Letters, Kingston University
- 1999: Honorary Degree, Staffordshire University
- 2003: Honorary Doctor of Laws, University of Bristol
- 2003: Honorary Doctor of Laws, Glasgow Caledonian University
- 2006: Honorary Doctor of Civil Law, University of East Anglia
- 2011: Honorary Doctorate, Middlesex University
- 2011: Honorary Fellowship, University of Central Lancashire
- 2013: Honorary Doctor of Laws, University of Greenwich
- 2014: Honorary Doctor of Letters, York St John University

Media offices
Preceded by Andrew Jaspan	Editor of The Observer; 1996–1998	Succeeded by Roger Alton
Academic offices
Preceded by John Landers	Principal of Hertford College, Oxford; 2011–2020	Succeeded by Tom Fletcher
