= Galapagos Conservation Trust =

British conservation charity

- Abbreviation: GCT
- Formation: 1995
- Type: Charity
- Headquarters: London, UK
- Key people: Charmian Caines (Chair); Jen Jones (CEO)
- Website: galapagosconservation.org.uk

The Galapagos Conservation Trust (GCT) is a British conservation charity (registered number 1043470) which focuses on saving animals at risk of extinction on the Galapagos Islands. It is a member of the Friends of Galapagos Organisations (also known as the Darwin Network). It was launched in 1995 at the Royal Society in London. The charity fundraises to support conservation projects in the Islands, including the reintroduction of the Floreana giant tortoise.
