= Chris Blackhurst =

British newspaper editor

Chris Blackhurst (born 24 December 1959) is a strategic communications advisor and commentator, who is a former editor of The Independent.

For four years, he was a director of CT Partners, the international strategic communications, campaigning, and advisory firm. He also writes a column for independent.co.uk. He contributes to numerous other magazines and publications, as well as making frequent appearances on TV and Radio, and making public speeches.

From 2013 he was Group Content Director of the four titles overseen by Evgeny Lebedev. He was a newspaper columnist for the Evening Standard and Independent, and presenter of Headline Interview on London Live TV.

He’s received several awards for his journalism. Blackhurst was London Press Club’s Business Journalist of the Year, 2011.

== Early life and education ==
Born in Barrow-in-Furness, Blackhurst was educated at Barrow Grammar School for Boys, after which he went on to study law at Trinity Hall, Cambridge. He has said that his school instilled self-confidence in him and has argued for the restoration of grammar schools.

== Life and career ==
Blackhurst after graduation joined the staff of a legal magazine, International Financial Law Review. He moved to Business magazine, then to Fleet Street, where he joined The Sunday Times, working on the Business section, then the Insight investigations team. In 1990 he became City Editor of the Sunday Express, moving to The Independent on Sunday in 1992 as their Senior Business Writer, and then to The Independent in 1993 as Westminster Correspondent. He became Deputy Editor of The Independent on Sunday and The Independent then followed editor Rosie Boycott to the Daily Express in 1998, as Deputy Editor. From 2002, Blackhurst edited the City Pages of the Evening Standard, until he was appointed Editor of The Independent in 2011.

He became Group Content Director of the four titles overseen by Evgeny Lebedev in June 2013.

Media offices
Preceded by Martin Jacques	Deputy Editor of The Independent; 1996–1998	Succeeded by Ian Birrell
Preceded by Tessa Hilton	Deputy Editor of the Daily Express; 1998–2001	Succeeded by Nicola Briggs
Preceded by Simon Kelner	Editor of The Independent; 2011–2013	Succeeded by Amol Rajan
