= Gareth McLean =

Scottish journalist (born 1975)

Gareth McLean (born c.1975) is a Scottish journalist and screenwriter who has written for The Guardian newspaper and on soap operas for the Radio Times magazine.

McLean graduated with an MA (Hons) in English from the University of Aberdeen, working at The Scotsman newspaper as a Feature Writer from 1997 until he began writing as a TV critic for The Guardian in 1999. He writes the weekly soaps column in the Radio Times, and has been The Guardian's TV editor since 2003, reviewing television programmes and interviewing actors and actresses.

He also writes about current affairs, popular culture, and fashion for The Guardian, and is an infrequent contributor to attitude, a London-based gay men's lifestyle magazine. He was shortlisted for the Young Journalist of the Year Award at the British Press Awards in 1997 and 1998. He is a regular contributor to various BBC and Independent radio programmes, including BBC Radio 4's Woman's Hour and The Message, The Media Show on LBC, and The Arts Show on BBC Radio Scotland. He is also a regular contributor to MediaTalk on Guardian Unlimited.

In 2017 he wrote a monologue, Something Borrowed, part of a series of one-off dramas entitled Queers. The series was curated by Mark Gatiss to mark 50 years since the passing of the Sexual Offences Act 1967, which decriminalised homosexual acts in England and Wales. The first production was directed by Mark Gatiss and performed by Mark Bonnar at The Old Vic on 28 July 2017. Alan Cumming starred in the BBC Four television production, which was broadcast on 3 August 2017.
