= The Observer =

British weekly newspaper

- The Observer front page on 30 November 2025
- Type: Sunday newspaper (Note: If Christmas Day falls on Sunday, a special Christmas edition is instead published on Saturday, which will be Christmas Eve.)
- Format: Broadsheet (until 2006); Berliner (2006–2018); Compact (since 2018)
- Owner: Tortoise Media
- Editor: James Harding
- Founded: 4 December 1791; 234 years ago
- Political alignment: Liberal
- Language: English
- Headquarters: 22 Berners Street, London W1T 3LP
- Circulation: 136,656 (as of July 2021)
- ISSN: 0029-7712
- OCLC number: 50230244
- Website: observer.co.uk

The Observer is a British newspaper published on Sundays. First published in 1791, it is the world's oldest Sunday newspaper.

In 1993 it was acquired by Guardian Media Group Limited, and operated as a sister paper to The Guardian and The Guardian Weekly. In December 2024, Tortoise Media acquired the paper from the Scott Trust Limited, and took ownership of The Observer on 22 April 2025.

== History ==
=== Origins ===
The first issue was published on 4 December 1791 by W.S. Bourne, making The Observer the world's oldest Sunday newspaper. Believing that the paper would be a means of wealth, Bourne instead soon found himself facing debts of nearly £1,600. Though early editions purported editorial independence, Bourne attempted to cut his losses and sell the title to the government. When this failed, Bourne's brother (a wealthy businessman) made an offer to the government, which also refused to buy the paper but agreed to subsidise it in return for influence over its editorial content. As a result, the paper soon took a strong line against progressive reformers such as Thomas Paine, Francis Burdett and Joseph Priestley.

=== 19th century ===
In 1807, the brothers decided to relinquish editorial control, naming Lewis Doxat as the new editor. Seven years later, the brothers sold The Observer to William Innell Clement, a newspaper proprietor who owned a number of publications. The paper continued to receive government subsidies during this period; in 1819, of the approximately 23,000 copies of the paper distributed weekly, approximately 10,000 were given away as "specimen copies", distributed by postmen who were paid to deliver them to "lawyers, doctors, and gentlemen of the town."

Clement maintained ownership of The Observer until his death in 1852. After Doxat retired in 1857, Clement's heirs sold the paper to Joseph Snowe, who also took over the editor's chair.

In 1870, wealthy businessman Julius Beer bought the paper and appointed Edward Dicey as editor, whose efforts succeeded in reviving circulation. Though Beer's son Frederick became the owner upon Julius's death in 1880, he had little interest in the newspaper and was content to leave Dicey as editor until 1889. Henry Duff Traill took over the editorship after Dicey's departure, only to be replaced in 1891 by Frederick's wife, Rachel Beer, of the Sassoon family. She remained as editor for thirteen years, combining it in 1893 with the editorship of The Sunday Times, a newspaper that she had also bought.

=== 20th century ===
Upon Frederick's death in 1903, the paper was purchased by the newspaper magnate Lord Northcliffe. In 1911, William Waldorf Astor was approached by James Louis Garvin, the editor of The Observer, about purchasing the newspaper from Northcliffe. Northcliffe and Garvin had a disagreement over the issue of Imperial Preference, and Northcliffe had given Garvin the option of finding a buyer for the paper.

Northcliffe sold the paper to Astor, who transferred ownership to his son Waldorf Astor, 2nd Viscount Astor four years later. Astor convinced his father to purchase the paper, which William did on the condition that Garvin also agree to edit the Pall Mall Gazette, which was also a property of the Astor family. Garvin departed as editor in 1942.

Ownership passed to Waldorf's sons in 1948, with David Astor taking over as editor. He remained in the position for 27 years, during which time he turned it into a trust-owned newspaper employing, among others, George Orwell, Paul Jennings and C. A. Lejeune. In 1977, the Astors sold the ailing newspaper to US oil giant Atlantic Richfield, which then sold it to Lonrho plc in 1981.

It became part of the Guardian Media Group in June 1993, after a rival acquisition bid by The Independent was rejected.

Farzad Bazoft, a journalist for The Observer, was executed in Iraq in 1990 on charges of spying. In 2003, The Observer interviewed the Iraqi colonel who had arrested and interrogated Bazoft and who was convinced that Bazoft was not a spy.

=== 21st century ===
On 27 February 2005, The Observer Blog was launched. In addition to the weekly Observer Magazine colour supplement which is still present every Sunday, for several years each issue of The Observer came with a different free monthly magazine. These magazines had the titles Observer Sport Monthly, Observer Music Monthly, Observer Woman and Observer Food Monthly.

The Observer followed its daily partner The Guardian and converted to Berliner format on Sunday 8 January 2006.

The Observer was awarded the National Newspaper of the Year at the British Press Awards 2007. Editor Roger Alton stepped down at the end of 2007, and was replaced by his deputy, John Mulholland.

The paper was banned in Egypt in February 2008 for publishing cartoons of the Islamic prophet Muhammad.

In early 2010, the paper was restyled. An article on the paper's website previewing the new version stated that "The News section, which will incorporate Business and personal finance, will be home to a new section, Seven Days, offering a complete round-up of the previous week's main news from Britain and around the world, and will also focus on more analysis and comment."

In July 2021, Ofcom announced that The Guardian continued to be the UK's most widely used newspaper website and app for news and had increased its audience share by 1% over the preceding year. 23% of consumers, who used websites or apps for news, used The Guardian, which also then hosted The Observer online content. This compared to 22% for the Daily Mail website.

==== Sale to Tortoise Media ====
In September 2024, The Guardian revealed it was in talks to sell The Observer to news website Tortoise Media. Journalists at Guardian Media Group passed a vote to condemn the sale and passed a vote of no confidence in the newspaper's owners, accusing it of betrayal amid concerns that the sale of the paper could harm the financial security of staff members.

On 6 December 2024, it was announced that, despite 48 hours of strikes by journalists, the Observer deal with Tortoise was agreed in principle and would go ahead. The agreement included the Trust taking a significant stock position in the purchaser. The final sale price has not been disclosed.

At the time of sale on 6 December 2024, The Observer was described as a centre-left newspaper.

On 18 December 2024, Guardian Media and Tortoise Media closed the sale. A new website was launched on 25 April 2025 and the first print edition under the new owners appeared on 27 April 2025.

It was announced that Lucy Rock, previously the paper's deputy editor, would be the new editor of The Observer. It was later clarified she is editor (print) reporting to the editor-in-chief, founder and major shareholder James Harding. In September 2025, she retired.

=== 2026 restructuring ===
In March 2026, The Observer announced a programme of voluntary redundancies across its workforce of around 140 staff, less than a year after its acquisition by Tortoise Media. The move was reported to reflect ongoing challenges around the newspaper’s digital strategy and financial sustainability.

== Supplements and features ==
After the paper was rejuvenated in early 2010, the main paper came with only a small number of supplements – Sport, The Observer Magazine, The New Review and The New York Times International Weekly, an 8-page supplement of articles selected from The New York Times that has been distributed with the paper since 2007. Every four weeks the paper includes The Observer Food Monthly magazine, and in September 2013 it launched Observer Tech Monthly, a science and technology section which won the Grand Prix at the 2014 Newspaper Awards.

Previously, the main paper had come with a larger range of supplements including Sport, Business & Media, Review, Escape (a travel supplement), The Observer Magazine and various special interest monthlies, such as The Observer Food Monthly, Observer Women monthly which was launched in 2006, Observer Sport Monthly and The Observer Film Magazine.

== The Newsroom ==
The Observer and its then-sister newspaper The Guardian opened The Newsroom, an archive and visitor centre in London, in 2002. The centre preserved and promoted the histories and values of the newspapers through its archive, educational programmes and exhibitions. The Newsroom's activities were all transferred to Kings Place in 2008. Now known as The Guardian News & Media archive, the archive preserves and promotes the histories and values of The Guardian and The Observer newspapers by collecting and making accessible material that provides an accurate and comprehensive history of the papers. The archive holds official records of The Guardian and The Observer, and also seeks to acquire material from individuals who have been associated with the papers. As well as corporate records, the archive holds correspondence, diaries, notebooks, original cartoons and photographs belonging to staff of the papers. This material may be consulted by members of the public by prior appointment. An extensive Manchester Guardian archive also exists at the University of Manchester's John Rylands University Library, and there is a collaboration programme between the two archives. Additionally, the British Library has a large archive of The Manchester Guardian available in its British Library Newspapers collection, in online, hard copy, microform, and CD-ROM formats.

In November 2007, The Observer and The Guardian made their archives available over the Internet. The current extent of the archives available is 1791 to 2003 for The Observer and 1821 to 2003 for The Guardian.

== Editors ==
- W. S. Bourne & W. H. Bourne (1791–1807)
- Lewis Doxat (1807–1857)
- Joseph Snowe (1857–1870)
- Edward Dicey (1870–1889)
- Henry Duff Traill (1889–1891)
- Rachel Beer (1891–1904)
- Austin Harrison (1904–1908)
- James Louis Garvin (1908–1942)
- Ivor Brown (1942–1948)
- David Astor (1948–1975)
- Donald Trelford (1975–1993)
- Jonathan Fenby (1993–1995)
- Andrew Jaspan (1995–1996)
- Will Hutton (1996–1998)
- Roger Alton (1998–2007)
- John Mulholland (2008–2018)
- Paul Webster (2018–2024)
- Lucy Rock (2024–2025)
- James Harding (2025–)

== Photographers ==
- Jane Bown (resident from 1949 until her death in 2014)
- Stuart Heydinger (1960–1966)
- Antonio Olmos (freelance)
- Harry Borden (freelance)
- Michael Peto (freelance)
- Colin Jones (freelance)
- Dean Chalkley (freelance)
- Don McCullin (freelance)
- Philip Jones Griffiths (freelance)
- Giles Duley (freelance)

== Awards ==
The Observer was named the British Press Awards National Newspaper of the Year for 2006. Its supplements have three times won "Regular Supplement of the Year" (Sport Monthly, 2001; Food Monthly, 2006, 2012).

Observer journalists have won a range of British Press Awards, including

- "Interviewer of the Year" (Lynn Barber, 2001; Sean O'Hagan, 2002; Rachel Cooke, 2005; Chrissy Iley (freelance for Observer and Sunday Times magazine), 2007)
- "Critic of the Year" (Jay Rayner, 2005; Philip French, 2008; Rowan Moore, 2013)
- "Food & Drink Writer of the Year" (John Carlin, 2003)
- "Travel Writer of the Year" (Tim Moore, 2004)

== See also ==
- Observer Mace – debating tournament, now known as the John Smith Memorial Mace

== Bibliography ==
- Marion Miliband ed. (1966), The Observer of the Nineteenth Century, 1791-1901, Longmans, London. Introduction by Asa Briggs.
- Richard Cockett (1990), David Astor and The Observer, André Deutsch, London. 294 pp. with index. ISBN 0-233-98735-5. Has endpapers that are facsimiles of The Observer, with other black-and-white photographic plates of personnel linked to the newspaper.
- Jane Bown (2015), A Lifetime of Looking, Faber & Faber Ltd.ISBN 1-783-35088-1. Contains the most iconic photos she took for The Observer from 1949 to the last photo she took a few months before her death in December 2014. Photos include The Beatles, Mick Jagger, Queen Elizabeth II, John Betjeman and Björk.
