= Roger Alton =

English journalist (born 1947)

- Born: 20 December 1947 (age 78); Oxford, England
- Education: Clifton College; Exeter College, Oxford
- Occupation: Journalist
- Employer(s): The Independent, The Observer, The Times

Roger Alton (born 20 December 1947) is an English journalist. He was formerly editor of The Independent and The Observer, and executive editor of The Times.

== Early life and education ==
He was educated at Clifton College and Exeter College, Oxford.

== Career ==
He joined the Liverpool Post on graduation, moving to The Guardian five years later as a sub-editor.

=== The Observer ===
He was the editor of the British national Sunday newspaper The Observer from 1998 to 2007. Under his editorship, The Observer's editorial view supported the invasion of Iraq, a stance that Alton, speaking to Stephen Sackur on the BBC's HARDtalk (22 August 2008) has since admitted may have been incorrect.

He resigned on 24 October 2007 after "a bitter falling-out with senior figures at the title's sister paper, The Guardian", and left The Observer at the end of 2007. Previously he was arts editor and G2 editor of The Guardian. He oversaw a rise in circulation during his editorship and introduced the award-winning Observer Sports, Food, and Music Monthlies.

=== The Independent ===
In April 2008, Alton was confirmed as the new editor of The Independent, beginning work on 1 July 2008. Joining at the start of the recession, The Independent's circulation and advertising revenues fell sharply. He also wrote a fortnightly sport column in the Spectator. Alton resigned from The Independent in April 2010 when the paper reverted to its former editor, Simon Kelner.

=== The Times ===
On 24 May 2010, Alton was appointed executive editor of The Times, succeeding Alex O’Connell, who was appointed arts editor. Alton began at his new paper on 28 June 2010. Alton left The Times in 2015.

== Personal life ==
Alton was briefly married to Helen Lederer, with whom he has a daughter.

== Views ==
In July 2011, Roger Alton gave an interview with Channel 4 News in which he lambasted members of the website Mumsnet for campaigning against the News of the World. Some members of the website had campaigned against the newspaper after it was revealed that the News of the World employees had hacked mobile phone voicemail messages, including those of murdered teenager Milly Dowler and, allegedly, victims of the 7 July 2005 London bombings. Alton turned his anger on members of the public who campaigned against these practices, labelling the Mumsnet members "fair trade tea"-drinking, "organic shortbread"-eating "yummy mummies." The interview received a lot of views on YouTube.

Media offices
Preceded by Adrian Hamilton	Deputy Editor of The Observer; 1994–1998 with Jocelyn Targett	Succeeded by John Mulholland and Paul Webster
Preceded by Will Hutton	Editor of The Observer; 1998–2007	Succeeded by John Mulholland
Preceded by Simon Kelner	Editor of The Independent; 2008–2010	Succeeded by Simon Kelner
Preceded by Alex O’Connell	Executive Editor of The Times; 2010–2015	Succeeded by Jeremy Griffin
