= The i Paper =

British daily newspaper

- Impartial news and intelligent debate
- Logo since December 2024

- Front page of the 4,401st edition of The i Paper on 31 December 2024
- Type: Daily newspaper
- Format: Compact
- Owners: Independent Digital News & Media Ltd (2010–2016); Johnston Press (2016–2018); JPIMedia (2018–2019); DMG Media (2019–present)
- Publisher: Independent Digital News & Media Ltd (2010–2016); Johnston Press (2016–2018); JPIMedia (2018–2019); DMG Media (2019–present)
- Editor: Oliver Duff
- Founded: 26 October 2010; 16 years ago
- Political alignment: Non-partisan
- Language: English
- Headquarters: Northcliffe House
- City: London
- Country: United Kingdom
- Circulation: 116,446 (as of September 2025)
- ISSN: 2051-3755
- Website: inews.co.uk

The i Paper, known as i until December 2024, is a British national newspaper published in London by DMG Media and distributed across the United Kingdom. It is aimed at "readers and lapsed readers" of all ages and commuters with limited time. It was launched in 2010 as a sister paper to The Independent.

The i was acquired by Johnston Press in 2016 after The Independent shifted to a digital-only model. The i came under the control of JPIMedia a day after Johnston Press filed for administration on 16 November 2018. The paper and its website were bought by DMG Media – part of the Daily Mail and General Trust group (DMGT) – on 29 November 2019, for £49.6 million. On 6 December 2019, the Competition and Markets Authority served an initial enforcement order on DMGT and DMG Media, requiring the paper to be run separately pending investigation.

The paper is classified as a "quality" in the UK market but is published in the standard compact tabloid-size format. Since its inception, The i Paper has expanded its layout and coverage, adding special sections for notable events and revamping its weekend edition. The paper had an average daily circulation of 302,757 in March 2013, significantly more than The Independent – its sister paper at the time – though that figure declined and had dropped to 116,446 by September 2025.

Politically, The i Paper intends to be non-partisan; it has refused to endorse any political party in every general election since 2015, claiming to be the only national paper of the UK to do so.

== History ==
=== Founding ===
A press statement released on the website of The Independent on 19 October 2010 announced the launch of the i. Also in October 2010, Independent Print Limited launched an advertising campaign to promote the new publication. The first issue of the i went on sale for 20p on 26 October 2010, along with a new-look version of The Independent.

Starting on 7 May 2011, a Saturday edition was published, with more pages and at the price of 30p. This increased to 40p in January 2014, with the weekday edition rising to 30p. In September 2016, the price was raised to 60p, with the weekday edition rising to 50p. At the start of September 2017, the price rose once again, to 60p for the weekday edition and 80p for the relaunched i weekend beginning later that month. The paper cited the rising cost of materials needed to print the paper and the increasingly difficult environment in which print journalism found itself.

=== 2016–2018 ===
On 11 February 2016, it was revealed that regional publisher Johnston Press, which owned The Yorkshire Post and The Scotsman, were in the advanced stages of talks to buy the i for around £24 million. The acquisition was completed before The Independent became a digital-only publication, and a "significant number" of staff joined the team from The Independent. The new editorial team was announced in April 2016.

On 30 September 2017, a new, redesigned, version of the weekend edition of the i went on sale, costing 80p. This relaunch of the weekend paper saw circulation rise by around 30,000, to around 290,000 of the first edition of the redesigned paper being sold. By August 2018, the weekend edition had become the strongest day of trading for the i.

In December 2017, the owners of the i, Johnston Press, announced the newspaper was bringing in a monthly profit of around £1 million. They stated that this was the result of: "Johnston Press management's strategy of investing in improved content under editor Olly Duff's clear leadership, increased brand awareness, distribution, and advertiser solutions, while delivering efficiencies". A February 2018 trading update from parent company Johnston Press stated that the paper held a 20% market share of the 'Quality' weekday market.

The i website, inews.co.uk, was reported to attract around two million unique viewers at the start of 2018; that figure had grown 457% by November, with Comscore reporting unique visitors to the website then stood at 5.2 million, surpassing the reach of The Times and Huffington Post UK.

=== 2018 ===
In November 2018, ownership of the i alongside the other assets of Johnston Press were transferred in a pre-packaged administration deal to JPIMedia, a company set up by the bondholders of Johnston Press, after several attempts to restructure the debt or sell the business were unsuccessful.

=== 2019–present ===
On 14 September 2019, The iweekend price rose from £1 to £1.20. On 29 November 2019, it was announced that JPIMedia had sold the i newspaper and website to the Daily Mail and General Trust (DMGT), which owns the Mail on Sunday and MailOnline. Lord Jonathan Harmsworth of Rothermere, the chair of DMGT, said that the paper would maintain its politically independent editorial style.

In March 2021, the i broke the story that Pontins holiday parks used a list of common Irish surnames as an internal document to prevent bookings by "undesirable guests". In December 2021, DMGT announced that both i and the DMGT-owned New Scientist magazine would be moved to a new division of the company, to be called Harmsworth Media.

In December 2024, the i was renamed The i Paper. A new masthead, "Impartial news and intelligent debate", was also adopted by the paper. Editor Oliver Duff explained that the rebrand was made "to reflect how we are talked about in conversation, in newsagents and on television. Our commitment to impartial journalism has only strengthened. These values are popular with our audience and motivate journalists in our newsroom".

== Format ==
The i is tabloid-size and stapled, and the first issue contained 56 pages. The i prides itself on having no supplements, something common in many other quality British newspapers, saying they want to give readers the best experience without supplements that "clog up" recycling bins. The newspaper contains "matrices" for news, business and sports — small paragraphs of information which are sometimes expanded upon in full articles further on in the paper. The title also includes a features section titled iQ, Arts and Business sections, puzzles and a television and radio guide. The managing director of The Independent stated several days before the newspaper went into print that the publication is designed for people who do not have much time to read a newspaper.

== Political stance ==
The i is known for having a neutral political stance, although it has also been described as having a centre-left political outlook. In 2015, the paper's editor Oliver Duff said it pursued "political impartiality". In 2019, Duff said it would report "without fear or favour", with the intention of being "tougher" than the BBC on maintaining impartiality while remaining "fair" in its reporting. The paper aims to present opinions from all parts of the political spectrum with the goal of encouraging its readership to form their own fact-based opinions. Ahead of the 2015 UK general election, Duff said the paper would remain neutral and refrain from endorsing a vote for any political party. In the 2017, 2019 and 2024 UK general elections, the i continued to refuse endorsing any political parties to maintain political neutrality. Explaining the paper's continued neutrality in 2024, Duff said the i was the only national paper to "never" support a political party and added that it "never will", stating that it gives "no one […] an easy ride. Not the Tories, Labour or Nigel Farage."

Nick Clegg, former UK Deputy Prime Minister and former leader of the Liberal Democrats, a centrist party, was a fortnightly columnist for the i from 2017, after leaving parliament; however, he has not written for i since 2018. His column usually featured in the "My View" comment section of the paper. During an interview for the i in December 2017, then Labour leader Jeremy Corbyn declared himself to be a dedicated reader of the i, saying that its compact size and concise articles suited his busy lifestyle as Leader of the Opposition. During the 2016 UK European Union membership referendum, held in June 2016, the paper chose not to declare for either "Leave" or "Remain", unlike a majority of other British newspapers who came out for either side of the debate.

== Reputation ==
The i was named National Newspaper of the Year at the 2015 News Awards. At the 2017 Press Awards, the i secured six nominations. Katy Balls was a finalist alongside Stephen Bush for Political Commentary of the Year, Yasmin Alibhai-Brown for Broadsheet Columnist of the Year, Alice Jones for Critic of the Year, Steve Connor for Science Editor of the Year, Kim Sengupta for Foreign Reporter of the Year, Sam Cunningham for Sports Journalist of the Year, while the paper was nominated for Best News Site of the Year. At the 2017 British Sports Journalism Awards, Hugo Lowell was nominated for Young Sports Writer of the Year.

At the 2018 British Media Awards, the i won gold in the Launch of the Year category for i weekend and Editorial Campaign of the Year category for its coverage of NHS cuts. The paper was also runner-up for both Print Product of the Year and Media Brand of the Year. The i was found in a 2018 poll to be the second-most trusted news brand in the UK after The Guardian. In March 2019, the i overtook The Guardian to become the most trusted digital news brand on-line, and third in print. The two then tied as most trusted national newsbrand for their paper editions in 2020; the i was third on-line. At the 2019 British Media Awards, the i won Gold in the Media Brand of the Year category, Silver for the Digital Product of the Year, and Bronze in the Print Product of the Year category.

Following its renaming in December 2024, the associated website redesign earned inews.co.uk the "Website of the Year" award at the 2025 Press Awards.

== Editors and contributors ==
=== Editors ===
- Simon Kelner (2010)
- Stefano Hatfield (2011)
- Oliver Duff (2013)

=== Regular contributors ===
- Yasmin Alibhai-Brown
- Katy Balls
- Ian Birrell
- Stephen Bush
- Simon Calder
- Patrick Cockburn
- Ian Dunt
- Stefano Hatfield
- Ayesha Hazarika
- Tom Kerridge
- Shaparak Khorsandi
- Lucy Mangan
- Stuart J. Ritchie
- Alexander McCall Smith
- Sarah Sands
- Mark Steel
- Janet Street-Porter

=== Sport writers ===
- Kevin Garside (chief sports correspondent)
- Sam Cunningham (chief football correspondent)
- Neville Southall (weekend columnist)
- Daniel Storey (chief football writer)
- Dylan Hartley (2023 Rugby World Cup columnist)
