= The Independent =

British online daily newspaper

- Homepage of The Independent in July 2021
- Type: Print newspaper (1986–2016); Online only newspaper (2016–present)
- Format: Broadsheet (1986–2003); Compact (2003–2016); Online only (2016–present)
- Owner(s): Evgeny Lebedev (41%); Sultan Muhammad Abuljadayel (30%); Justin Byam Shaw (26%); Minor shareholders (3%)
- Publisher: Independent Digital News & Media Ltd
- Editor: Geordie Greig
- Founded: 7 October 1986; 40 years ago
- Ceased publication: 26 March 2016 (print)
- Political alignment: Liberalism
- Headquarters: Alphabeta Building, 14–18 Finsbury Square, EC2A 1AH, London
- Sister newspapers: The Independent on Sunday (1990–2016); The i Paper (2010–2013); Online only indy100 (2013–present)
- ISSN: 1741-9743 (print); 0951-9467 (web)
- OCLC number: 185201487
- Website: independent.co.uk the-independent.com

The Independent is a British online newspaper, often nicknamed the Indy. It was established in 1986 as a national morning printed paper, beginning as a broadsheet and changing to compact format in 2003. The last printed edition was published on Saturday 26 March 2016, leaving only the online edition.

== History ==
=== 1980s ===
Launched in 1986, the first issue of The Independent was published on 7 October in broadsheet format. It was produced by Newspaper Publishing plc and created by Andreas Whittam Smith, Stephen Glover and Matthew Symonds. All three partners were former journalists at The Daily Telegraph who had left the paper towards the end of Lord Hartwell's ownership. Marcus Sieff was the first chairman of Newspaper Publishing, and Whittam Smith took control of the paper.

The paper was created at a time of a fundamental change in British newspaper publishing. Rupert Murdoch was challenging long-accepted practices of the print unions and ultimately defeated them in the Wapping dispute. Consequently, production costs could be reduced which created openings for more competition. The Independent attracted some of the staff from the two Murdoch broadsheets who had chosen not to move to his company's new headquarters. Launched with the advertising slogan "It is. Are you?", and challenging both The Guardian for centre-left readers and The Times as the newspaper of record, The Independent reached a circulation of more than 400,000 by 1989.

=== 1990s ===
When The Independent launched The Independent on Sunday in 1990, sales were less than anticipated, partly due to the launch of the Sunday Correspondent four months prior, although this direct rival closed at the end of November 1990.

In the 1990s, The Independent was faced with price cutting by the Murdoch titles, and started an advertising campaign accusing The Times and The Daily Telegraph of reflecting the views of their proprietors, Rupert Murdoch and Conrad Black. It featured spoofs of the other papers' mastheads with the words The Rupert Murdoch or The Conrad Black, with The Independent below the main title.

Newspaper Publishing had financial problems. A number of other media companies were interested in the paper. Tony O'Reilly's media group and Mirror Group Newspapers (MGN) had bought a stake of about a third each by mid-1994. In March 1995, Newspaper Publishing was restructured with a rights issue, splitting the shareholding into O'Reilly's Independent News & Media (43%), MGN (43%), and Prisa (publisher of El País) (12%).

In 1996, there was further refinancing, and Andrew Marr was appointed editor of The Independent. In 1998, O'Reilly bought the other shares of the company for £30 million, and assumed the company's debt, and Rosie Boycott also became editor.

Boycott left in April 1998 to join the Daily Express, and Marr left in May 1998, later becoming the BBC's political editor. Simon Kelner was appointed as the editor. By this time, the circulation had fallen below 200,000. Independent News spent heavily to increase circulation, and the paper went through several redesigns. While circulation increased, it did not approach the level which had been achieved in 1989, or restore profitability. Job cuts and financial controls reduced the morale of journalists and the quality of the product.

=== 2000s ===
Ivan Fallon, on the board since 1995 and formerly a key figure at The Sunday Times, replaced Hopkins as head of Independent News & Media in July 2002. By mid-2004, the newspaper was losing £5 million per year. A gradual improvement meant that by 2006, circulation was at a nine-year high.

In November 2008, following further staff cuts, production was moved to Northcliffe House, in Kensington High Street, the headquarters of Associated Newspapers. The two newspaper groups' editorial, management and commercial operations remained separate.

=== 2010s ===
On 25 March 2010, Independent News & Media sold the newspaper to a new company owned by the family of Russian oligarch Alexander Lebedev for a nominal £1 fee and £9.25 million over the next 10 months, choosing this option over closing The Independent and The Independent on Sunday, which would have cost £28 million and £40 million respectively, due to long-term contracts. Alexander's son Evgeny became chairman of the new company, with Alexander becoming a board director. In 2009, Lebedev had bought a controlling stake in the London Evening Standard. Two weeks later, editor Roger Alton resigned.

In July 2011, The Independent's columnist Johann Hari was stripped of the Orwell Prize he had won in 2008 after claims, to which Hari later admitted, of plagiarism and inaccuracy. In January 2012, Chris Blackhurst, editor of The Independent, told the Leveson inquiry that the scandal had "severely damaged" the newspaper's reputation. He nevertheless told the inquiry that Hari would return as a columnist in "four to five weeks". Hari later announced that he would not return to The Independent. Jonathan Foreman contrasted The Independent's reaction to the scandal unfavourably with the reaction of American newspapers to similar incidents such as the Jayson Blair case, which led to resignations of editors, "deep soul-searching", and "new standards of exactitude being imposed". The historian Guy Walters suggested that Hari's fabrications had been an open secret among the newspaper's staff and that their internal inquiry was a "facesaving exercise".

The Independent and The Independent on Sunday endorsed "Remain" in the Brexit referendum.

In March 2016, The Independent closed its print edition to become a pure play digital media company. The last printed edition was published on Saturday 26 March 2016. The Independent on Sunday published its last edition on 20 March 2016 and was closed.

In 2017, Sultan Muhammad Abuljadayel bought a 30% stake in The Independent. Independent Arabia was launched in October 2018. It is published under licence, and owned and managed by Saudi Research and Media Group (SRMG), a major publishing organisation with close ties to the Saudi royal family.

=== 2020s ===
In September 2020, The Independent launched Independent en Español, a wholly owned and operated Spanish language edition.

Geordie Greig was appointed The Independent's Editor-in-Chief in January 2023. He oversaw a period of editorial investment. Later that year, Chief Executive Zach Leonard moved to the United States as Global COO and President (North America), and former Editor Christian Broughton was appointed Chief Executive. Louise Thomas was appointed US Editor in March 2024.

In January 2026, The Independent was in talks to take commercial and digital control of The Evening Standard. The partnership was agreed in April 2026, with The Evening Standard staying as a separate company and The Independent also taking control of print advertising.

== Content ==
=== Format and design ===
The Independent began publishing as a broadsheet, in a series of celebrated designs. The final version was designed by Carroll, Dempsey and Thirkell following a commission by Nicholas Garland who, along with Alexander Chancellor, was unhappy with designs produced by Raymond Hawkey and Michael McGuiness – on seeing the proposed designs, Chancellor had said: "I thought we were joining a serious paper." The first edition was designed and implemented by Michael Crozier, who was Executive Editor, Design and Picture, from pre-launch in 1986 to 1994.

From September 2003, the paper was produced in both broadsheet and tabloid-sized versions, with the same content in each. The tabloid edition was termed "compact" to distance itself from the more sensationalist reporting style usually associated with "tabloid" newspapers in the UK, preferring to remain focused on hard news (similarly to the tabloid-size edition of The Times). The smaller format appeared gradually throughout the UK. Soon afterwards, Rupert Murdoch's Times followed suit, introducing its own tabloid-sized version. Prior to these changes, The Independent had a daily circulation of around 217,500, the lowest of any major national British daily, a figure that climbed by 15% as of March 2004 (to 250,000). Throughout much of 2006, circulation stagnated at a quarter of a million. On 14 May 2004, The Independent produced its last weekday broadsheet, having stopped producing a Saturday broadsheet edition in January. The Independent on Sunday published its last simultaneous broadsheet on 9 October 2005, and thereafter followed a compact design until the print edition was discontinued.

On 12 April 2005, The Independent redesigned its layout to a more European feel, similar to France's Libération. The redesign was carried out by a Barcelona-based design studio. The weekday second section was subsumed within the main paper, double-page feature articles became common in the main news sections, and there were revisions to the front and back covers. A new second section, "Extra", was introduced on 25 April 2006. It is similar to The Guardian's "G2" and The Times's "Times2", containing features, reportage and games, including sudoku. In June 2007, The Independent on Sunday consolidated its content into a news section which included sports and business, and a magazine focusing on life and culture. On 23 September 2008, the main newspaper became full-color, and "Extra" was replaced by an "Independent Life Supplement" focusing on different themes each day.

Three weeks after the acquisition of the paper by Alexander Lebedev and Evgeny Lebedev in 2010, the paper was relaunched with another redesign on 20 April. The new format featured smaller headlines and a new pullout "Viewspaper" section, which contained the paper's comment and feature articles.

=== Front pages ===
Following the 2003 switch in format, The Independent became known for its unorthodox and campaigning front pages, which frequently relied on images, graphics or lists rather than traditional headlines and written news content. For example, following the Kashmir earthquake in 2005, it used its front page to urge its readers to donate to its appeal fund, and following the publication of the Hutton Report into the death of British government scientist David Kelly, its front page simply carried the word "Whitewash?" In 2003, the paper's editor, Simon Kelner, was named "Editor of the Year" at the What the Papers Say awards, partly in recognition of, according to the judges, his "often arresting and imaginative front-page designs". In 2008, as he was stepping down as editor, he stated that it was possible to "overdo the formula" and that the style of the paper's front pages perhaps needed "reinvention".

Under the subsequent editorship of Chris Blackhurst, the campaigning, poster-style front pages were scaled back in favour of more conventional news stories.

=== Online presence ===
The Independent's original website launched in 1996. On 23 January 2008, The Independent relaunched its online edition.

From 2009, the website started carrying short video news bulletins provided by the Al Jazeera English news channel.

The Independent launched Independent TV in 2020 to increase video journalism, which was a growth area for the business. In March 2023, The Independent released The Body in the Woods, a feature-length documentary by its Chief International Correspondent, Bel Trew, about the Ukraine war. Video content can be viewed on their website, smart TV app, and on their mobile app.

== Political views ==
The Independent is generally described as centrist, centre-left, and liberal-left. When the paper was established in 1986, the founders intended its political stance to reflect the centre of the British political spectrum and thought that it would attract readers primarily from The Times and The Daily Telegraph. It has been seen as leaning to the left wing of the political spectrum, making it more a competitor to The Guardian; however, The Independent tends to take a liberal, pro-market stance on economic issues. At the first two UK general elections it covered, in 1987 and 1992, The Independent did not endorse a party, but at the 1997 general election it endorsed the Labour Party, and continued to make endorsements at subsequent elections. In a 12 June 2007 speech, British Prime Minister Tony Blair called The Independent a "viewspaper", saying it "was started as an antidote to the idea of journalism as views not news. That was why it was called The Independent. Today it is avowedly a viewspaper not merely a newspaper".

An Ipsos MORI poll estimated that in the 2010 United Kingdom general election, 44% of regular readers voted Liberal Democrat, 32% voted Labour, and 14% voted Conservative, compared to 23%, 29%, and 36%, respectively, of the overall electorate. In the 2010 general election, The Independent called for tactical voting to stop the Conservatives from winning seats and supported the idea of a Labour and Liberal Democrat coalition. Before the 2015 United Kingdom general election, The Independent said that a continuation of the Conservative and Liberal Democrat coalition after the general election would be a positive outcome.

At the end of July 2018, The Independent led a campaign it called the "Final Say", a change.org petition by its then editor Christian Broughton, for a binding referendum on the Brexit deal between the UK and the European Union.

Geordie Greig, who was appointed as editor in 2023, has been described as a "Notting Hill Tory" with international and pro-European views. The newspaper endorsed Labour in the 2024 United Kingdom general election, although added what it termed as a warning that the party "must turn its promises into policies that benefit the hardworking and hopeful people of this country".

== Personnel ==
=== Editors ===
The Independent:

1986: Andreas Whittam Smith
1994: Ian Hargreaves
1995: Charles Wilson
1996: Andrew Marr
1998: Rosie Boycott
1998: Andrew Marr and Rosie Boycott
1998: Simon Kelner
2008: Roger Alton
2010: Simon Kelner
2011: Chris Blackhurst
2013: Amol Rajan
2016: Christian Broughton
2023: Geordie Greig

The Independent on Sunday:

1990: Stephen Glover
1991: Ian Jack
1995: Peter Wilby
1996: Rosie Boycott
1998: Kim Fletcher
1999: Janet Street-Porter
2002: Tristan Davies
2008: John Mullin
2013: Lisa Markwell

There have also been various guest editors over the years, such as Elton John on 1 December 2010, The Body Shop's Anita Roddick on 19 June 2003 and U2's Bono in 2006.

=== Writers and columnists ===
Predominantly in The Independent

- Yasmin Alibhai-Brown
- Bruce Anderson
- Paul Arden
- Archie Bland
- Thom Brooks
- Andrew Brown (writer)
- Cooper Brown
- Michael Brown
- Simon Calder
- Ben Chu
- Alexa Chung
- Rob Cowan
- Sloane Crosley
- Tracey Emin
- Nigel Farage
- Mitch Feierstein
- Andrew Feinberg
- Helen Fielding
- Robert Fisk
- Eric Garcia
- Chris Gulker
- Ian Hamilton
- Howard Jacobson
- Alex James
- Peter Jenkins
- Owen Jones
- Andrew Keen
- John Rentoul
- Alan Rusbridger
- Kim Sengupta
- Jon Sopel
- Mark Steel
- Rebecca Thomas
- Bel Trew
- Dominic Lawson
- John Lichfield
- Philip Llewellin
- Laura Lyons
- Andy McSmith
- Donald MacIntyre
- Serena Mackesy
- Tracey MacLeod
- Rhodri Marsden
- Jan McGirk
- Deborah Orr
- Christina Patterson
- Peter Popham
- Simon Read
- Steve Richards
- Lizzie Dearden
- Ash Sarkar
- Alexei Sayle
- Will Self
- L. J. K. Setright
- Boyd Tonkin
- Catherine Townsend
- Paul Vallely
- Brian Viner
- Lynne Walker
- Andreas Whittam Smith
- Claudia Winkleman

Predominantly The Independent on Sunday

- Janet Street-Porter—Editor-at-Large
- Kate Bassett—Theatre
- Patrick Cockburn, John Rentoul, Joan Smith, Paul Vallely, and Alan Watkins—"Comment & Debate"
- Peter Cole—"On the Press"
- Rupert Cornwell—"Out of America"
- Hermione Eyre—Reviews
- Jenny Gilbert—Dance
- Christopher Hirst and Lucinda Rogers—"The Weasel" (weekly illustrated column 1995–2008)
- Dom Joly—"First Up" in The Sunday Review
- Tim Minogue and David Randall—"Observatory"
- Cole Moreton—"News Analysis" (Regular double-spread)
- Anna Picard—Opera and Classical
- Simon Price—Rock and Pop

== Longford Prize ==
The Independent sponsors the Longford Prize, meant to recognise those who have helped the lives of current or former prisoners, in memory of Lord Longford.

== Related publications ==
The Independent on Sunday
- Type: Sunday newspaper
- Format: Broadsheet
- Publisher: Independent Print Limited
- Editor: Lisa Markwell
- Founded: 1990; 36 years ago
- Ceased publication: 20 March 2016
- Circulation: 155,661
- Sister newspapers: The Independent; The i Paper (2010–2013); indy100
- ISSN: 0958-1723
- OCLC number: 500339994

=== The Independent on Sunday ===
The Independent on Sunday (IoS) was the Sunday sister newspaper of The Independent. It ceased to exist in 2016, the last edition being published on 20 March.

=== The i Paper ===
In October 2010, the i, a compact newspaper, was launched. The i is a separate newspaper but uses some of the same editorial staff. It was later sold to regional newspaper company Johnston Press, before being sold again. It currently belongs to Daily Mail and General Trust.

=== Indy100 ===
The online news site was originally called i100 and launched in 2014. It was renamed to indy100 in February 2016.

=== The (RED) Independent ===
The Independent supported U2 lead singer Bono's Product RED brand by creating The (RED) Independent, an occasional edition that gave half the day's proceeds to the charity. The first edition was in May 2006. Edited by Bono, it drew high sales.

A September 2006 edition of The (RED) Independent, designed by fashion designer Giorgio Armani, drew controversy due to its cover shot, showing model Kate Moss in blackface for an article about AIDS in Africa.

=== The Pride List ===
The Pride List started out as The Pink List in 2000, before becoming The Rainbow List. It celebrates prominent LGBT people in the UK. It became The Pride List in 2023 when The Independent became Pride in London's exclusive news partner.

=== BuzzFeed and HuffPost ===
With the aim of becoming "Britain's biggest publisher network for gen Z and millennial audiences", in March 2024 The Independent took over BuzzFeed and HuffPost in the UK, agreeing a multi year licensing deal.

== Awards and nominations ==
The Independent and its journalists have won and been nominated for a range of British Press Awards, including:

- The Independent was awarded "National Newspaper of the Year" for 2003
- In January 2013, The Independent was nominated for the Responsible Media of the Year award at the British Muslim Awards
- The Independent on Sunday was awarded "Front Page of the Year" for 2014's "Here is the news, not the propaganda", printed on 5 October 2014
- Barbara Blake-Hannah Award, Kuba Shand-Baptiste, British Journalism Awards, 2020
- "Best Use of Data", "Best Diversification of Commercial Strategy", and "Rising Star (Emily Robinson)", AOP Digital Publishing Awards, 2021
- "Publisher of the Year" and "Branded Content team of the Year", The Drum Awards for Online Media, 2022
- "Best Research/Insight Project", "Best Use of Data", "Product Development Team of the Year", and "Best Digital Consumer Publishing Company 'Grand Prix'" AOP Digital Publishing Awards, 2022
- "Best Writer, Lifestyle", Harriet Hall, BSME Awards 2022
- "Breaking Travel News", Simon Calder, Broadcast Programme of the Year", Simon Calder, "National Consumer Feature of the Year", Sian Lewis; "Sustainability Travel feature of the Year", Mike MacEacheran, Travel Media Awards 2022
- Black Talent Awards, "Marketing, Media and Creative", Nadine White, 2022
- "The Change-Maker Award", Beth Gordon, Global Women in Marketing Awards, 2022
- The Independent won the Brand of the Year Award in The Drum Awards for Online Media 2023
- "Foreign Reporter of the Year", Bel Trew, The Press Awards, 2023
- "Brand of the Year", The Drum Awards for Online Media, 2023
- "Campaign of the Year" (with the Evening Standard) SOE Media Freedom Awards, 2023
- "The Marie Colvin Award", Bel Trew, British Journalism Awards, 2023
- "The Bill Murray Award for Outstanding Contribution to Digital Publishing", Jo Holdaway, AOP Digital Publishing Awards, 2024
- "Corporate and Utilities", Campaign Media Awards, 2024
- "Best Digital Publishing Company 2025" at the Association of Publishers' annual awards competition

== See also ==
- Independent Foreign Fiction Prize
- Brett Straub incident
