= We not only saved the world =

Statement by UK prime minister Gordon Brown

Prime Minister Gordon Brown replies "we not only saved the world" in response to a question by Leader of the Opposition, David Cameron at Prime Minister's Questions

"We not only saved the world" is a statement uttered by the prime minister of the United Kingdom, Gordon Brown, during Prime Minister's Questions at the House of Commons in December 2008. It has since been interpreted as evidence of Brown's pride in his actions since the 2008 financial crisis.

The statement was a slip of the tongue; Brown had actually intended to say that "we had not only saved the banks and led the world", referring to the British government's actions during the 2008 financial crisis and its bank rescue package in 2008.

== Background ==
Brown had attracted international praise for his actions during the 2008 financial crisis and the subsequent 2008 United Kingdom bank rescue package. The first line of an opinion piece by economist Paul Krugman published in The New York Times on 12 October 2008 was "Has Gordon Brown, the British prime minister, saved the world financial system?" with Krugman stating that Brown and the chancellor of the exchequer, Alistair Darling, had "...defined the character of the worldwide rescue effort, with other wealthy nations playing catch-up".

== Context ==
The comment occurred during an exchange with the Leader of the Opposition, David Cameron, in which Cameron asked Brown about the resumption of lending to British businesses during Prime Minister's Questions on 10 December 2008.

Cameron asked whether Brown accepted that "his recapitalisation has failed" following Governor of the Bank of England Mervyn King's recent statement that the purpose of the recapitalisation of British banks was not "merely to protect the banks" but to ensure that "the flow of lending to the real economy could continue at normal rates". Brown replied that "The first point of recapitalisation was to save banks that would otherwise have collapsed. We not only saved the world..." before he was interrupted by laughter from opposition MPs. After the interruption, Brown continued, saying that "Not only did we work with other countries to save the world's banking system, but not one depositor actually lost any money in Britain", concluding that "The Opposition may not like the fact that we led the world in saving the banking system, but we did". Cameron replied that "Well, it is now on the record. The Prime Minister is so busy talking about saving the world that he has forgotten about the businesses in the country that he is supposed to be governing" before talking further about issues with recapitalisation."

== Aftermath ==
The BBC's political correspondent David Thompson wrote that "It was only a slip of the tongue...The problem is, a lot of people suspect Gordon Brown might actually believe it" and that the comment gave Cameron "a priceless opportunity to accuse [Brown] of being more concerned with grandstanding on the global stage than dealing with the fears of small businesses and homeowners". The parliamentary sketch writer Ann Treneman wrote in The Times the following day Brown "seems increasingly distracted these days and yesterday, as he scanned his briefing papers, he looked unprepared" and Brown's comment "...brought screams of joy from the Tories. The PM looked irritated. A Mexican wave of hysteria was engulfing the Commons while Gordon Brown stood, as stony faced as a statue. The Cabinet was doing its best not to laugh". Sketch writer Simon Hoggart wrote in The Guardian that the comment may have been a Freudian slip, and added that Brown was buried under a "sudden, overwhelming mountainous avalanche of laughter" and "hooting derision, chortling, spluttering, screeching and general mayhem filled the Chamber like oil in a lava lamp, bubbling and swirling". The laughter lasted for 21 seconds which Hoggart described as "an age in Parliament" and that Brown tried to plough his way through but was "hopeless at snappy comebacks".

The Liberal Democrat MP Susan Kramer said that her fellow parliamentarians "roared with laughter" at the comment because "you can practically see him [Brown] getting into the Superman outfit" before he enters the House of Commons. The Labour Party MP Patricia Hewitt said that the comment would "[excite] people in Westminster" for a couple of hours and that Brown himself had been smiling after it. Hewitt also described Brown as a "commanding figure" and that the British public like their Prime Ministers to "perform well" on the 'world stage'.

The economic journalist Anatole Kaletsky wrote that "Gordon Brown has saved the world yet again" in an article praising Brown for his appearance at the World Economic Forum of 2009 in Davos, Switzerland.

The economist William Keegan titled his 2012 book about Brown Saving the World? - Gordon Brown Reconsidered.
