= Van der Zee =

Van der Zee is a Dutch toponymic surname meaning "from the sea". It is relatively common in the province of Friesland. Notable people with the surname include:

- Age van der Zee (1903–1982), Dutch pole vaulter
- Anouska van der Zee (born 1976), Dutch cyclist
- Bibi van der Zee (born 1970s), British journalist
- Hans van der Zee (born 1956), Dutch football manager
- Hein van der Zee (1929–1991), Dutch boxer
- Hendrik van der Zee (born 1967), Dutch checkers/draughts player
- James Van Der Zee (1886–1983), American photographer
- Jim van der Zee (born 1995), Dutch singer
- Karen Van der Zee (born 1947), pseudonym of Dutch romance novelist Windela Kilmer
- Reece Vander Zee (born 2005), American football player

== See also ==
- C. Van Der Zee House, historic home in Albany, New York
