= Victor Keegan =

British journalist (born 1940)

Victor Keegan (born 1940) is a British journalist and author focusing on economics and technology issues. Born in London, he attended Wimbledon College and Brasenose College, Oxford. After which, he spent most of his working life at The Guardian as reporter, financial correspondent, deputy financial editor, economics editor, business editor, duty editor, Chief Leader Writer, Assistant Editor and Online Editor.

== Career ==
For 11 years Keegan was a member of the Scott Trust, owner of the Guardian Media Group. He formerly wrote a weekly column about the internet and personal technology (see link below), and contributed to both The Guardian's website and its blog Comment is Free. He was curator of the "SLart Gallery" in the virtual world Second Life from 2008 to 2012. With his colleague Neil McIntosh he introduced The Guardian's first blogs (Technology and Games).

In 2001 he started the first-ever text message poetry competition for The Guardian and in August 2003 he started kickAAS one of the first dedicated political blogs, campaigning to help developing countries by abolishing agriculture subsidies. He wrote a fortnightly column on economics and industry for more than 20 years, followed by a weekly column about consumer technology until his retirement, aged 70. From 2008 to 2012 he was chair of a not-for-profit start-up, World Film Collective (WFC), which encourages young people in very poor countries to make and edit films on their mobile phones. Since 2017 Keegan has been Chair of the Safer Parks Panel for St James's Park and the Green Park.

Keegan blogs extensively about London on LondonMyLondon.co.uk + OnLondon.co.uk, and on English and Welsh vineyards at victorkeegan.com and victorkeegan.wordpress.com

Keegan has written six books of poems: Crossing the Why, Big Bang, Remember to Forget, Alchemy of Age, London My London and Restrictive Memories. They are available on Kindle. {https://www.amazon.co.uk/s?k=Victor+keegan&ref=nb_sb_noss_2} In January 2021 he published "Vic Keegan's Lost London" https://www.bookdepository.com/Lost-London-Vic-Keegan/9780954076276

== Family ==
He is married to Rosie Keegan and has two sons, Dan and Chris. His older brother, William Keegan, used to be economics editor of The Observer and is still a columnist on that paper.

== Bibliography ==
- The New Europe (Fourth Estate, 1993) co-edited with Martin Kettle.
- The Guardian Year, 1999 (Fourth Estate, 1999); ISBN 1-84115-231-5 (editor)
- Crossing the Why (Shakespearesmonkey, 2001); ISBN 0-9540762-0-6
- Best Text Poems: The cream of the Guardian's text message poetry competitions (Adlibbed, 2006); ISBN 1-897312-02-4

(editor)

- Big Bang, (Lulu.com) 2007; ISBN 0-9540762-1-4 Poems about the start of life and onwards
- "Remember to Forget" Poems about early life and real life published at Lulu.com (2010); ISBN 978-0-9540762-2-1

Vic Keegan's Lost London https://www.bookdepository.com/Lost-London-Vic-Keegan/9780954076276
