= Sean Smith (photojournalist) =

British photographer and filmmaker

Sean Smith is a British photographer and filmmaker. He has covered conflicts and wars in Iraq, Afghanistan, Lebanon and Democratic Republic of the Congo. He has been on staff at The Guardian newspaper since 1988. His work in the UK has dealt with inner-city disturbances of the 1980s, heroin users and the lives of professional wrestlers, among other subjects.

Smith's video reports have appeared on the Newsnight program, Channel 4 News and the United States' ABC News.

In September, 2011, Random House published Frontlines, a book with an introduction by journalist Jon Snow, documenting the invasion of Iraq and its aftermath, as well as wars in Afghanistan, Congo and Lebanon. A selection of the photographs in the book were exhibited in Kings Place, London, and Northumbria University, Newcastle upon Tyne.

His pictures have also appeared in Five Thousand Days: Press Photography in a Changing World and Decade.

== Awards and recognition ==
- 2006: The Press Photographer’s Year Photograph of the Year.
- 2007: The Press Photographer’s Year Photograph of the Year.
- 2007: The Press Photographer’s Year First Place News.
- 2007: DAYS Japan International Special Jury Prize.
- 2008: Royal Television Society Award Best International News for Iraq: Apache Company, made by GuardianFilms and Channel 4 News ITN. It was the first time a newspaper won such an award.
- 2008: The Press Photographer’s Year First Prize Multimedia
- 2010: The Press Photographer's Year Sports Features.
- 2010: Shortlisted for a Foreign Press Association Award and the Royal Television Society Independent Award.
- 2010: Hilary Mantel’s photograph of the decade.
- 2010: Geoff Dyer’s photograph of the decade.

== Exhibitions ==
- 2013: Sean Smith: On the Margins, The Dissenters' Gallery, Kensal Green Cemetery.
- 2013: Iraq: Photographs by Sean Smith, Imperial War Museum North.
