= Emma Brockes =

British journalist and writer (born 1975)

- Born: 1975 (age 49–50); Camborne, Cornwall, United Kingdom
- Education: St Edmund Hall, Oxford University

Emma Brockes (born 1975) is a British author and a contributor to The Guardian and The New York Times. She lives in New York.

== Biography ==
The daughter of a South-African-born mother, Brockes studied English at St Edmund Hall, Oxford University, graduating in 1997 with a first. At Oxford, she was editor of the student newspaper Cherwell and won the Philip Geddes prize for journalism for her work. She worked briefly as feature writer on The Scotsman, before joining The Guardian in 1997. She has been recognised by the British Press Awards three times, winning the "Young Journalist of the Year" award in 2001 and the "Feature Writer of the Year" award in 2002. She was nominated as "Interviewer of the Year" in 2006.

In 2005, an interview by Brockes in The Guardian was described by its subject Noam Chomsky as a "scurrilous piece of journalism". The Guardian later withdrew the article from the website, acknowledging "Ms Brockes's misrepresentation of Prof Chomsky's views on Srebrenica", and offering "an unreserved apology to Prof Chomsky" for Brockes's suggestion that Chomsky denied Srebrenica to be a massacre.

An external ombudsman review determined that the "Readers' Editor was right to conclude that an apology and correction was deserved", though adding that "the removal of the original interview from the website was unnecessary and over responsive", a view that Chomsky himself shared. The text of the original can now be found on Chomsky's official website.

Brockes's first book, What Would Barbra Do?, was published in 2007. The New York Times Book Review responded: "Spirited, articulate and utterly devourable ... If I could offer [Brockes] any advice, it would be ... to write as many books on as many subjects as she can, as fast as is reasonably possible." Another book by Brockes, She Left Me the Gun: My Mother's Life Before Me (London: Faber), appeared in 2013 and featured as BBC Radio 4's Book of the Week.

Brockes is now a freelance writer, but continues to write profiles of major public figures for The Guardian, as well as contributing her own work to The New York Times and other publications.
