= Raed Jarrar =

Iraqi architect

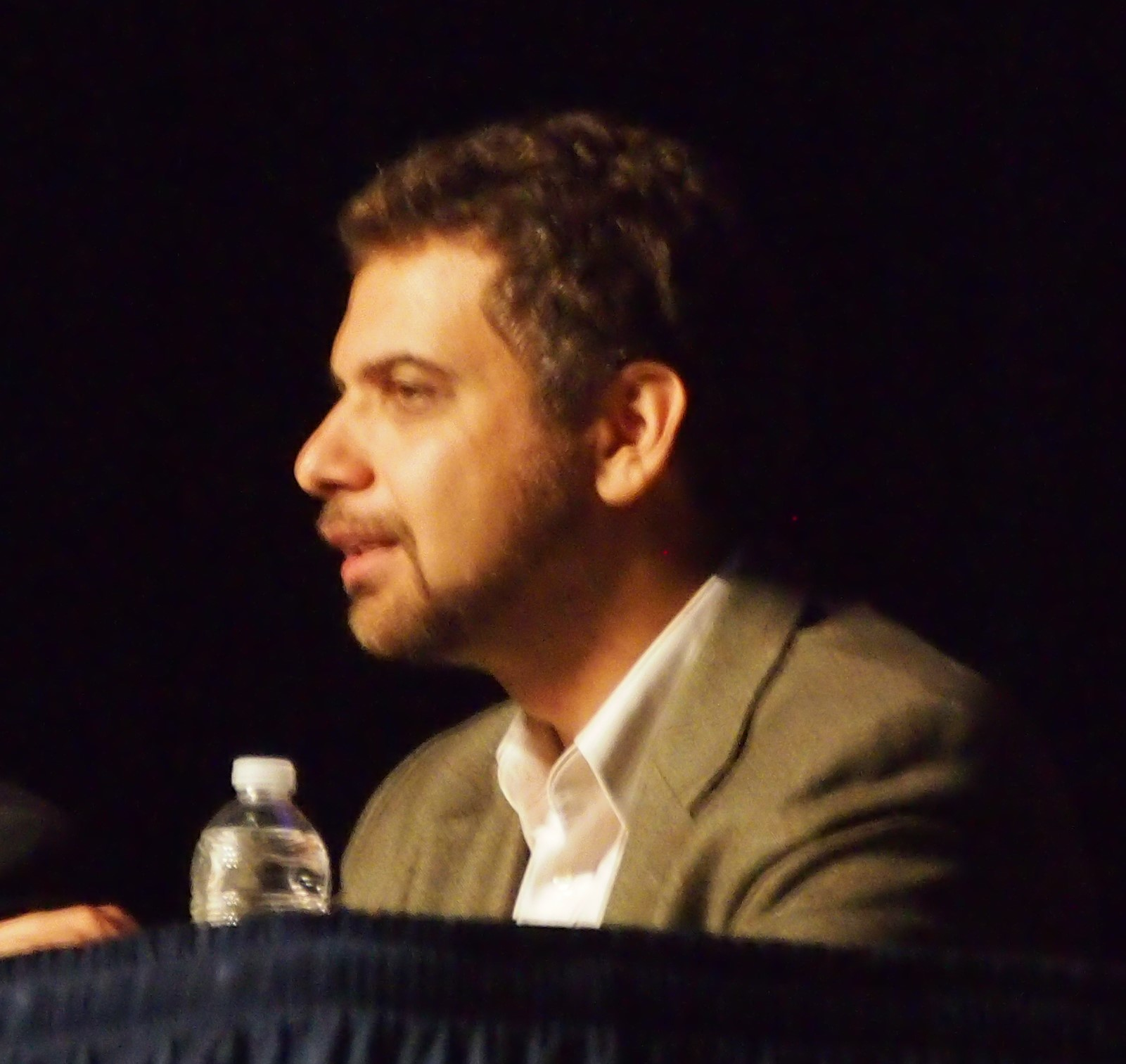
- Education: University of Baghdad, University of Jordan

Raed Jarrar (Arabic: رائد جرار) is a Palestinian Arab-American architect, blogger, and political advocate based in the U.S. Capital Washington, DC.

== Life ==
Jarrar was born in Iraq, and raised in Jordan, Saudi Arabia and Iraq. He is half Iraqi and half Palestinian. He holds a degree in architecture from the University of Baghdad, and a master's degree in Architectural Engineering, specialized in post-war reconstruction, from the University of Jordan.

While attending the University of Baghdad, he met the fellow architecture student later known as Salam Pax.

Jarrar first gained prominence as the person referenced in the title of the blog "Where is Raed?", written and maintained by Salam Pax, to which Jarrar himself made infrequent posts. This blog received widespread media coverage during the 2003 invasion of Iraq and afterwards.

Jarrar, along with his family, compiled their blogs into The Iraq War Blog, An Iraqi Family's Inside View of the First Year of the Occupation, which was published in June 2008. The book explores, through their words, how their lives were affected as terrorist activities, as well as the American military and coalition allies response, devastated the city. They persevered through night attacks and daytime missile strikes that often wreaked destruction to their home by blowing doors off hinges and breaking windows. The Jarrar family, while chronicling their daily lives amid the destruction, also provides descriptive analysis of the political climate that resulted from the American occupation of the country.

After the fall of Baghdad in 2003, Jarrar worked as the country director of CIVIC Worldwide, the only door-to-door civilian casualties survey in Iraq since 2003. He also founded Emaar, an NGO that carried out humanitarian and reconstruction work in Baghdad and southern Iraq. By 2017, Jarrar was Middle East and North Africa advocacy director for Amnesty International, United States. That year, he was denied entry by Israel to mourn his recently deceased father, in his father's hometown of Jenin. In 2020 Jarrar became advocacy director at DAWN.

== JetBlue incident ==
Jarrar's T-shirt slogan, "we will not be silent" in Arabic and English.

Jarrar later gained attention after an incident on August 12, 2006 at John F. Kennedy International Airport. Raed had attempted to board a JetBlue flight from New York City to Oakland, California while wearing a black T-shirt with the text "We will not be silent" in English and Arabic. The shirts were produced by The Critical Voice, an anti-war group; the text was inspired by the German phrase Wir schweigen nicht ("We will not be silent"), the slogan of the White Rose, the "subversive" German antifascist anti-Nazi organization. As Jarrar himself related:

"So I went to the airport in the morning, and I was prevented to go to my airplane by four officers, because I was wearing this t-shirt that says 'We Will Not Be Silent' in both Arabic and English. And I was told by one of the officials that wearing a t-shirt with Arabic script in an airport now is like going to a bank with a t-shirt that reads, 'I am a robber'."

After a lengthy exchange with airport staff, Jarrar was persuaded to cover his T-shirt with another T-shirt bought for him by JetBlue staff from an airport gift shop.

On August 13, 2007, the American Civil Liberties Union filed a lawsuit against JetBlue alleging illegal discrimination against Jarrar. In January 2009 JetBlue paid Jarrar $240,000 to settle the case.

Nusrat Jahan Choudhury, an expert in Constitutional law at the American Civil Liberties Union who followed the trial, noted: "neither the TSA officials involved nor JetBlue could identify a single passenger who had supposedly been 'concerned' by Mr. Jarrar's t-shirt. Nor had they inquired whether the nature of any purported 'concern' was based on a legitimate reason or an illegitimate racial bias, perhaps grounded in the stereotyping of Mr. Jarrar as a "terrorist" simply because he is Arab and wore a shirt with Arabic script."

== See also ==
- Marla Ruzicka
- Jarrar family
