= Ian Cobain =

British journalist (born 1960)

- Born: 1960 (age 65–66); Liverpool, England
- Occupation: Journalist

Ian Cobain (born 1960) is a British journalist. Cobain is best known for his investigative journalism into human rights abuses committed by the British government post-9/11, the secrecy surrounding the British state and the legacy of the Northern Ireland's Troubles.

== Early life ==
Ian Cobain was born in 1960 in Liverpool, England, and lives with his wife and two children in London.

== Journalism ==
A journalist since the early 1980s, Cobain was the senior investigative reporter for British newspaper The Guardian until August 2018.

He has reported on six wars, including the war in the Gulf, and the wars in Afghanistan and Iraq. In September 2005, he revealed that the British government had been supporting the CIA's "extraordinary rendition" programme. In 2006, he joined the BNP as part of an undercover investigation, and ended up being appointed central London organiser for the party, a position he swiftly resigned.

Cobain published a book in 2012, Cruel Britannia, which documented the British government's use of torture in the last 70 years. David Hare described it as "one of the most shocking and persuasive books of the year", Peter Oborne in The Spectator said, "Carefully researched and well-written… [Cobain] should be congratulated for addressing a subject which much of the rest of Fleet Street has been determined to ignore", and the Sunday Times identified it as a "must-read" and declared it, "a fine study of the role Britain has played in the business of torture". The book won the Paddy Power/Total Politics Debut Political Book of the Year award.

Throughout his journalistic career, Cobain has taken a close interest in the Troubles and the legacy of the conflict. As a result, in 2012, he was retained as an expert witness by lawyers seeking to overturn the murder conviction of Liam Holden, who had been the last man to be sentenced to hang in Britain before his sentence was commuted to life. Also in 2012, Cobain investigated allegations of collusion between Northern Irish police and Loyalist paramilitary gunmen who had shot dead six men in a bar in the village of Loughinisland in 1994. A subsequent report by the Police Ombudsman for Northern Ireland, Al Hutchinson, confirmed the findings of Cobain. In 2014, Cobain drew upon contemporary police records, witness statements and pathologists' reports to reconstruct the events of the Ballymurphy shootings in west Belfast in August 1971. A fresh inquest into the deaths was held between late 2018 and early 2020, and on 11 May 2021, this coroner's inquest found that the 10 civilians killed were innocent, and that the use of lethal force by the British Army was "not justified". The 11th death was not part of the inquest.

As of 2019, Cobain was a journalist at the Middle East Eye.

== Rejection from the DSEI ==
Cobain was rejected from attending the 2019 DSEI international arms sales fair in London Docklands, on the grounds that he tweeted messages unfavourable to the arms trade and DSEI, and because it was "[suspected that] he [would] not write anything positive about DSEI".

== Prizes ==
Cobain has been shortlisted for the Orwell Prize for journalism and won the Martha Gellhorn Prize and the Paul Foot Award for investigative journalism, as well as two Amnesty International journalism awards, and, with fellow Guardian journalist, Richard Norton-Taylor, a Human Rights Campaign of the Year Award from Liberty, for their "investigation into Britain's complicity in the use of torture".

== Works ==
- Cruel Britannia: A Secret History of Torture, Portobello Books, 2012. ISBN 184627334X
- The History Thieves: Secrets, Lies and the Shaping of a Modern Nation, Portobello Books, 2016. ISBN 1846275830
- Anatomy of a Killing: Life and Death on a Divided Island, Granta Books, 2020. ISBN 9781846276408
