= Salam Pax =

Iraqi blogger

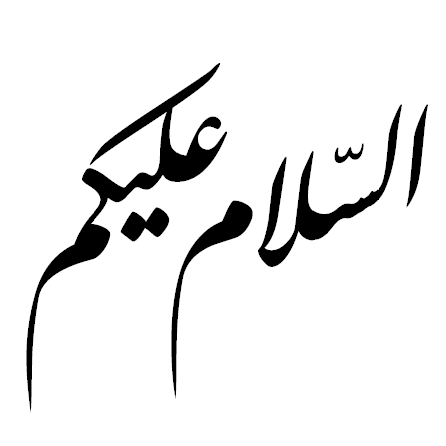
- "Peace be upon you" (Arabic)
- Born: Salam al-Janabi; 1973 (age 52–53); Baghdad, Iraq
- Other name: Salam Abdulmunem
- Education: Vienna International School; University of Baghdad (Architecture); City University London (Journalism)
- Occupation: UNICEF
- Years active: 2003–2009
- Notable credit(s): Pre- and post-invasion blogs from Iraq (2003); RTS Television Journalism Award - Innovation (2004)
- Title: Communications Officer
- Family: Adnan al-Janabi (father)
- Website: Salam Pax, the Baghdad Blogger

Salam Pax is the pseudonym of Salam Abdulmunem (Arabic: سلام عبد المنعم), aka Salam al-Janabi (Arabic: سلام الجنابي), under which he became the "most famous blogger in the world" during and after the 2003 invasion of Iraq. Along with a massive readership, his site "Where is Raed?" received notable media attention. The pseudonym consists of the word for "peace" in Arabic (salām) and in Latin (pax). His was one of the first instances of an individual's blog having a wide audience and impact.

== Biography ==
Salam Abdulmunem (the name he uses now, based on Abd al-Munim) was born to a well-to-do secular family in Baghdad in 1973. His father Adnan Abd al-Munim al-Janabi, a Sunni, worked for OPEC, his mother was a Shi'ite, while Salam himself became skeptical of religion. He travelled to Vienna, Austria, with his parents when he was 5, the family returned to Baghdad five years later. At 16 years old Salam returned to Austria alone in order to study at the Vienna International School where he became fluent in English in addition to German and his native Arabic.

When he went through his yearly allowance from back home in a month, his family brought him to Iraq in 1995, where Salam continued his study of architecture at the University of Baghdad. He described the first two years as the most difficult period in his life:

I felt lost somewhere between the East and the West. I did not know where I belonged for a long time.

After graduation, he worked for the Baghdad office of a Beirut, Lebanon, architectural consultancy and as an occasional interpreter for foreign journalists before and during the invasion of Iraq, when he became a successful English-language blogger under the name Salam Pax and a contributor to The Guardian beginning from 4 June 2003. He moved to London in 2007, where he took up journalism at City University London, and then lived in Beirut. Salam Abdulmunem returned to Baghdad in 2009 and started working as Communications Officer for UNICEF in Iraq in 2010.

== Where is Raed? ==
In his blog, Salam discussed his friends, disappearances of people under the government of Saddam Hussein, the 2003 invasion of Iraq, and his work as an interpreter for journalist Peter Maass. The title of Salam's site referred to his friend Raed Jarrar, who was working on his master's degree in Jordan at that time. Raed did not respond promptly to e-mails, so Salam set up the weblog for him to read. Salam continued to post updates to the site even after it was temporarily blocked in Iraq. During the war, he gave accounts of bombings and other attacks from his suburb of Baghdad until his Internet access (and the electrical grid) was interrupted. Salam remained offline for weeks, writing his diary entries on paper in order to post them later.

Putting an end to earlier doubts and speculations about the blog's authenticity, The Guardian newspaper tracked its author down in May 2003 and printed a story confirming that the person behind the pseudonym Salam Pax indeed lived in Iraq, that Salam was his real first (given) name, and that he was a 29-year-old architect. Subsequent entries discussed the chaotic postwar economy, and a June 1, 2003, post appeared to celebrate an anarchist effort, centered in the western Al-Adel Neighborhood of Baghdad, to provide free Internet access to all of Iraq. It turned out not to be instigated by political anarchists, but by Iraqis who ran the prewar Internet cafes in Baghdad for Uruknet, the former government ISP.

== The Baghdad Blog and other reporting ==
In 2003 Atlantic Books, in association with The Guardian, published a book based on "Where is Raed?" under the title The Baghdad Blog (ISBN 1-84354-262-5). It comprises Salam's blog entries from September 2002 to June 2003 with footnotes.

In August 2004, after not having updated his previous blog for several months, Pax started a second blog titled "shut up you fat whiner!" He also worked as a journalist for The Guardian, writing columns and featured articles. In October 2004 he was sent to the United States by The Guardian to report on the American presidential race and current thought there on the subject of Iraq.

In February 2005 a series of filmed reports by Salam Pax, produced by Guardian Films and transmitted by the BBC's Newsnight television programme, won the Royal Television Society Award for Innovation. In his Newsnight report broadcast in October 2005, he interviewed Iraqi Member of Parliament Adnan al-Janabi, a Sunni moderate who served as vice-chair of the constitutional committee, about the proposed Iraqi constitution and revealed that al-Janabi was his father. Salam also mentioned that his mother was Shia, and described his family as being secular in political orientation.

== Quotes ==
- "23/3 8:30pm (day4) we start counting the hours from the moment one of the news channels report that the B52s have left their airfield. It takes them around 6 hours to get to Iraq. On the first day of the bombing it worked precisely. Yesterday we were a bit surprised that after 6 hours bombs didn't start falling. The attacks on Baghdad were much less than two days ago. We found out today in the news that the city of Tikrit got the hell bombed out of it. Today the B52s took off at 3pm, in half an hour we will know whether it is Baghdad tonight or another city."
- "One day, like in Afghanistan, those journalists will get bored and go write about Syria or Iran; Iraq will be off your media radar. Out of sight, out of mind. Lucky you, you have that option. I have to live it."
- "There were days when the Red Crescent was begging for volunteers to help in taking the bodies of dead people off the city street and bury them properly. The hospital grounds have been turned to burial grounds.."
- "You can follow the trail of the foreigners by how much things cost in a certain district."
- "Anyway, all that doesn't matter now. Saddam is gone, thanks to you. Was it worth it? Be assured it was. We all know that it got to a point where we would have never been rid of Saddam without foreign intervention; I just wish it would have been a bit better planned."

== See also ==
- Riverbend (blogger)
