= William Keegan =

British journalist

William James Gregory Keegan, CBE (born 3 July 1938) is a British journalist and a fiction and non-fiction author. He was economics editor of The Observer from 1977 to 2003, and continues to contribute to the paper as a columnist.

== Education and early life ==
Keegan was educated at Wimbledon College and Trinity College, Cambridge. He completed his national service in the Royal Tank Regiment from 1957 to 1959.

== Career ==
Keegan became a journalist at the Financial Times in 1963; he moved to the Daily Mail in 1964, then returned for a nine-year spell at the Financial Times in 1967. He then worked in the Bank of England Economics Intelligence Department, and as assistant to the Bank's Governor, from 1976 to 1977.

From 1977 to 2003 he was economics editor of The Observer; after reaching the age of 65 he continued there as a Senior Economics Commentator.

He has sat on a number of committees and advisory boards, beginning in 1981 on the BBC Advisory Committee on Business and Industrial Affairs. Keegan has authored two fiction books, in 1974 and 1976, and eight books on economics and politics, between 1978 and 2012.

In 1989 he became a visiting professor of journalism at the University of Sheffield, and in 2012 a visiting professor of economics at Queen Mary University of London. He is also a visiting professor at the Policy Institute, King's College London, and is involved in The Strand Group seminar series there.

In 2009 Keegan received a CBE for services to journalism.

As of 2024, William Keegan is a columnist for The Observer.

== Views ==
In an article in November 2022, Keegan wrote that the Organisation for Economic Co-operation and Development states of "20 leading economies, only Russia is performing worse than the UK." In Keegan's opinion the UK was known as the "sick man of Europe" before joining the European Union and is known that way again after leaving the EU. Keegan wrote that Brexit was not the cause of all the UK's problems, but Brexit has magnified them. In March 2024, he wrote in favour of the UK re-joining the EU.

== Personal life ==
Keegan is married to a barrister. They live in Islington, London. He has seven children, including four from a previous marriage.

His brother Victor Keegan was a journalist at The Guardian, and a member of the Scott Trust which owns the Guardian Media Group.

== Works ==
Fiction

- Consulting Father Wintergreen (Unknown, 1974).
- A Real Killing (St Martins Pr, 1977).

Non-Fiction

- (with Rupert Pennant-Rea), Who Runs the Economy? Control and Influence in British Economic Policy (London: Temple Smith, 1979).
- Mrs. Thatcher's Economic Experiment (London: Allen Lane, 1984; 2nd ed. 1985).
- Britain Without Oil (London: Harmondsworth, 1985).
- Mr. Lawson's Gamble (London: Hodder & Stoughton, 1989).
- The Spectre of Capitalism (Radius, 1992).
- 2066 and All That: Britain and Europe Sort it Out (Iynx Publishing, 2000).
- The Prudence of Mr. Gordon Brown (John Wiley & Sons, 2003).
- Saving the World? - Gordon Brown Reconsidered (Searching Finance Ltd, 2012).
- Mr Osborne's Economic Experiment (Searching Finance Ltd, 2014).
- (with David Marsh and Richard Roberts), Six Days in September: Black Wednesday, Brexit and the making of Europe (OMFIF Press, 2017).
