= Robert Parry (journalist) =

American investigative journalist (1949–2018)

- Born: Robert Earle Parry; June 24, 1949; Hartford, Connecticut, United States
- Died: January 27, 2018 (aged 68); Arlington County, Virginia, United States
- Education: Colby College
- Occupation: Investigative journalist
- Employers: Middlesex Daily News (pre-1974); Associated Press (1974–1987); Newsweek (1987–1990); PBS (1990, 1991, 1992); Consortium News (1995–2018)
- Known for: Reporting on: Iran–Contra affair; CIA/Contra drug trafficking in U.S.; 1980 October Surprise theory
- Spouse: Diane Duston
- Children: 4
- Awards: George Polk Award (1984); I. F. Stone Medal for Journalistic Independence (2015); Martha Gellhorn Prize for Journalism (2017)
- Website: consortiumnews.com

Robert Earle Parry (June 24, 1949 – January 27, 2018) was an American investigative journalist. He covered the Iran–Contra affair for the Associated Press (AP) and Newsweek, and was known for breaking controversial stories in the 1980s and '90s, including an alleged CIA-Contra partnership to traffic cocaine in the U.S., a CIA-provided assassination manual used by the Nicaraguan Contras, and the "October Surprise" theory regarding the 1980 U.S. presidential election.

He was awarded the George Polk Award for National Reporting in 1984 and the I.F. Stone Medal for Journalistic Independence by Harvard's Nieman Foundation in 2015. Parry was the editor of Consortium News from 1995 until his death in 2018.

== Life and career ==
Born in Hartford, Connecticut, Parry received a B.A. in English in 1971 from Colby College in Waterville, Maine. He began his journalism career in Framingham, Massachusetts working for his father's newspaper, The Middlesex Daily News. He joined the Associated Press (AP) in 1974, moving to its Washington, D.C. bureau in 1977. Following the 1980 presidential election, he was assigned to AP's Special Assignment (investigative reporting) unit. Among the areas he covered were the revolutionary upheavals in El Salvador and Nicaragua.

Parry was a finalist for the 1985 Pulitzer Prize for National Reporting, and won the George Polk Award for National Reporting in 1984 for his AP work on the Iran-Contra affair where, among other disclosures, he revealed that the CIA had provided an assassination manual, Psychological Operations in Guerrilla Warfare, to the Contras. In mid-1985, he wrote the first article on Oliver North's involvement in the Iran-Contra affair and, together with Brian Barger, made a controversial claim in late 1985 that the CIA and Contras were trafficking cocaine in the U.S. to finance secret military operations in Nicaragua. This reporting prompted Senator John Kerry to launch a Congressional investigation into Iran–Contra. AP had initially refused to publish the drug trafficking story, and only relented when its Spanish-language newswire service accidentally printed a translated version of it.

Barger and Parry continued to press their investigation of North even as most of the media declined to pursue it. The two journalists eventually published a detailed story in mid-1986, based on 24 sources, which led to a Congressional committee asking questions of North. After North denied the allegations, Barger was pushed out of the AP, and Parry was unable to publish any follow-ups to the story until Eugene Hasenfus' plane (Corporate Air Services HPF821) was shot down in Nicaragua in October 1986, which revived national concern with covert actions being carried out against the Sandinista government. After learning his boss had been "conferring with [Oliver] North on a regular basis", Parry left AP in 1987 to join Newsweek, where he remained until 1990. Later, when journalist Gary Webb published his explosive 1996 newspaper series "Dark Alliance", alleging the Reagan administration had let the Contras sell crack cocaine in the U.S. to fund anti-Sandinista activities, Parry offered words of support to Webb who was receiving heavy criticism from the mainstream media.

In August 1990, the PBS Frontline program asked Parry to research the rumored October Surprise theory about the 1980 U.S. presidential election. This resulted in him making several Frontline documentaries, which aired in 1991 and 1992. When commenting on Parry's investigative work, Salon wrote, "his continuing quest to unearth the facts of the alleged October Surprise has made him persona non grata among those who worship at the altar of conventional wisdom."

In 1995, Parry founded the Consortium for Independent Journalism Inc. (CIJ), a non-profit, U.S.-based independent news service that publishes the Consortium News website. He also edited the investigative publication, I.F. Magazine.

In October 2015, Parry received the I.F. Stone Medal for Journalistic Independence by Harvard's Nieman Foundation for Journalism, "for his career distinguished by meticulously researched investigations, intrepid questioning, and reporting that has challenged mainstream media." In June 2017, he was awarded the Martha Gellhorn Prize for Journalism.

Parry died on January 27, 2018, following a series of strokes caused by undiagnosed pancreatic cancer that he had been living with for the previous 4-5 years.

== Publications ==
=== Books ===
- Fooling America: How Washington Insiders Twist the Truth and Manufacture the Conventional Wisdom. William Morrow, 1992.
- Trick or Treason: The October Surprise Mystery. Sheridan Square Press, 1993. ISBN 978-1879823082. OCLC 28294820.
- The October Surprise X-Files: The Hidden Origins of the Reagan-Bush Era. 1996.
- Lost History: Contras, Cocaine, the Press & Project Truth. Media Consortium, 1999.
- Secrecy & Privilege: Rise of the Bush Dynasty from Watergate to Iraq. Media Consortium, 2004.
- Neck Deep: The Disastrous Presidency of George W. Bush, with Sam and Nat Parry. Media Consortium, 2007.
- America's Stolen Narrative: From Washington and Madison to Nixon, Reagan and the Bushes to Obama. 2012.

=== Articles ===
- "Iran-Contra's Untold Story." Foreign Policy, no. 72 (Autumn 1988), pp. 3–30. doi:10.2307/1148818. JSTOR 1148818.
- "Contra-Cocaine: Big Media's Big Mistakes." I.F. Magazine (July/August 1997), pp. 9–12.
- US House Admits Nazi Role in Ukraine. Consortium News, June 12, 2015.
