= Neil McIntosh (journalist) =

British journalist (born 1974)

Neil McIntosh (born 16 February 1974 in Glasgow, Scotland) is a Scottish journalist who was announced on 10 February 2021 as the next editor of The Scotsman newspaper.

McIntosh was educated at Dunoon Grammar School, Argyll and Napier University, Edinburgh. He has an MBA from the Open University Business School.

An early advocate of blogging in journalism, he introduced the Guardian's Online Blog with Jack Schofield and Victor Keegan in 2001, and later became assistant editor of Guardian Unlimited in 2004. He set up a network of weblogs for the Guardian, including Comment is free, and later established audio and video services for the site.

Later he was Managing Editor of BBC Online. Previously, he worked for the Wall Street Journal, as Editor of Europe.WSJ.com at the site's launch on 9 February 2009. Prior to that, he was head of editorial development at Guardian Unlimited, The Guardian newspaper's website.

== Bibliography ==
- McIntosh, Neil (2002) "Cyber Crime". Heinemann. (ISBN 0-431-16144-5).
- As contributor, (2005) "2005: Blogged" Friday (ISBN 0-9548318-3-7).
