= Hala Jaber =

Lebanese-British journalist

Hala Jaber is a Lebanese-British journalist. She was born in West Africa and writes for The Sunday Times.

== Work ==
Her first book, Hezbollah: Born With a Vengeance, was published in 1997. The book describes the rise and political agenda of Hezbollah against the background of Lebanese history from 1970 to 1997. Her second book, The Flying Carpet to Baghdad: One Woman's Fight for Two Orphans of War, was published in 2009. The book chronicles her efforts to help two girls during the Iraq War.

Jaber was awarded the Amnesty International Journalist of the Year Award in 2003. She won Foreign Correspondent of the Year at the British Press Awards in 2005 and 2006 for her coverage of the Iraq War, and in 2012 for her coverage of the Libyan uprising. She co-won the Martha Gellhorn Prize for Journalism for her work in Iraq in 2007.

In May 2015, NOW News, a defunct Lebanon-based news website, published a trove of leaked emails from the Syrian government of President Bashar al-Assad. The leaked emails revealed that she had contacted and sought to protect George Chaoui, an EU sanctioned Christian Syrian citizen, and alleged member of the Syrian Electronic Army. Additional emails have noted that she is seen as one of a handful of "favorable" journalists to the government; due to her contacts with Syrian officials, and having interviewed President Assad twice during the course of the Syrian Civil War.

== Personal life ==
Hala Jaber was married to award-winning news photographer Steve Bent until his death on Christmas Day 2011.

== Publications ==
- Hezbollah: Born with a Vengeance (New York, NY: Columbia University Press, 1997). ISBN 978-0231108348.
- The Flying Carpet to Baghdad: One Woman's Fight for Two Orphans of War (London: Macmillan, 2009). ISBN 978-0-230-71485-4. UK edition

The Flying Carpet of Small Miracles: A Woman's Fight to Save Two Orphans (New York, NY: Riverhead Books, 2009). ISBN 978-0-670-06961-3. US edition

== Articles ==
- http://www.statewatch.org/cia/documents/ST-terror-reborn-in-falluja-ruins-18-12-05.pdf
- The Times
- The Times
