= Martha Gellhorn Prize for Journalism =

- Description: Reporting that penetrates established versions of events
- Country: United Kingdom
- Presented by: Martha Gellhorn Trust
- Reward: £5,000
- Website: www.marthagellhorn.com

The Martha Gellhorn Prize for Journalism, named for the war correspondent, Martha Gellhorn, was established in 1999 by the Martha Gellhorn Trust. The Trust is a UK-registered charity.

The award is founded on the following principles:

The award will be for the kind of reporting that distinguished Martha: in her own words "the view from the ground". This is essentially a human story that penetrates the established version of events and illuminates an urgent issue buried by prevailing fashions of what makes news. We would expect the winner to tell an unpalatable truth, validated by powerful facts, that exposes establishment conduct and its propaganda, or "official drivel", as Martha called it. The subjects can be based in this country or abroad.

The prize is awarded annually to journalists writing in English whose work has appeared in print or in a reputable internet publication.

Alexander Matthews was the chair of the Martha Gellhorn Trust Prize Committee in 2011. According to its website, the prize committee includes James Fox, Jeremy Harding, Cynthia Kee, Sandy Matthews, Shirlee Matthews and John Pilger.

== Previous winners ==
- 1999: Nick Davies (The Guardian)
- 2000: Jeremy Harding (London Review of Books)
- 2001: Geoffrey Lean (The Independent)
- 2002: Robert Fisk (The Independent)
- 2003: Chris McGreal (The Guardian)
- 2004: Patrick Cockburn (The Independent)
- 2005: Ghaith Abdul-Ahad (The Guardian); Jonathan Steele (The Guardian) received a special award for his distinguished career as a reporter.
- 2006: Hala Jaber (The Sunday Times) and Michael Tierney (The Glasgow Herald)
- 2007:
- 2008: Dahr Jamail (unembedded, Inter Press Service, IPS) and Mohammed Omer (unembedded, Inter Press Service, IPS)
- 2009: Ian Cobain (The Guardian) for the prize, and Marie Colvin (Sunday Times) for the "Martha Gellhorn Special Award for Journalism"
- 2010: Johann Hari (The Independent)
- 2011: Julian Assange (WikiLeaks) for the prize, and Umar Cheema, Charles Clover, and Jonathan Cook for the "Martha Gellhorn Special Award for Journalism"
- 2012: Gareth Porter (Inter Press Service, IPS)
- 2013: Chris Woods, Alice Ross and Jack Serle (The Bureau of Investigative Journalism)
- 2014: Iona Craig (Freelance: Al Jazeera America, The Times)
- 2015: not awarded
- 2016: not awarded
- 2017: Robert Parry (Freelance: Consortium News)
