= Chris McGreal =

British journalist and author

Chris McGreal is a reporter for The Guardian.

He is the author of American Overdose: The Opioid Tragedy in Three Acts published by Public Affairs in the US and Guardian Faber in the UK.

== Career ==
McGreal is a foreign correspondent for The Guardian who has covered Africa, the Middle East and Central America. He is now based in the US. He has won awards for his coverage of Africa, Israel and the U.S. A former merchant seaman, he began his career in journalism in 1982 with BBC local radio. He worked as a producer at the BBC World Service in London before moving to Venezuela in 1985 as a reporter on the English-language Daily Journal in Caracas and as a correspondent for the BBC.

In 1987 McGreal moved to Mexico City for the BBC and, later, The Independent. In 1990, he became The Independent on Sunday's first South Africa correspondent following the release of Nelson Mandela from jail. He joined The Guardian in 1992 and remained based in Johannesburg to report on the transition from apartheid as well travelling widely in Africa to cover the Angolan Civil War, the Rwandan genocide, the invasion of Zaire and fall of Mobutu Sese Seko, and military rule in Nigeria.

McGreal won the 1995 Amnesty International national print award for an article about the organisers of the Rwandan genocide. He was awarded the 2002 James Cameron Prize for his coverage of Africa and "work as a journalist that has combined moral vision and professional integrity". The judges praised his "even-handed reporting and analysis of sub-Saharan Africa - without allowing his judgment to be affected by sentimentality or historical guilt".

McGreal was appointed The Guardian's Jerusalem correspondent in 2002 at the height of the second Palestinian uprising. In 2004 he won the Martha Gellhorn Award (London), for reporting of Israel & Palestinian territories that "penetrated the established version of events and told an unpalatable truth".

In 2006, McGreal returned to South Africa. He made repeated undercover trips to Zimbabwe to report on the political violence of President Robert Mugabe's regime. He was runner up in the 2006 British Media Award by the Foreign Press Association in London for his Zimbabwe coverage. In 2009 he was appointed The Guardian's Washington correspondent. He was runner up in the Foreign Press Association award for Print/Web Feature Story of the Year for a series retracing route of The Grapes of Wrath to report on economic depression in modern America. He has continued to report from the Middle East at times, including the Egyptian and Libyan revolutions in 2011.

== Awards ==
- 1995: Amnesty International print reporter of the year for reporting of Rwandan genocide.
- 1996: Foreign Press Association, London. Runner up British Media Award for Africa coverage
- 2002: James Cameron prize, London, for Africa coverage for "work as a journalist that has combined moral vision and professional integrity".
- 2004: Martha Gellhorn Prize for Journalism, London, for reporting of Israel & Palestinian territories that "penetrated the established version of events and told an unpalatable truth".
- 2006: Foreign Press Association, London. Runner up British Media Award for Zimbabwe coverage
- 2009: Foreign Press Association, Runner Up, Print/Web Feature Story of the Year for a series retracing route of "Grapes of Wrath" to report on economic depression in modern America

== Works ==
- American Overdose: The Opioid Tragedy in Three Acts, Public Affairs, 2018, ISBN 9781610398619. Shortlisted for the J. Anthony Lukas Book Prize 2019. Longlisted for the 2019 Orwell Prize for Political Writing.
