= Adnan al-Janabi =

Iraqi politician, tribal leader and economist

Adnan Abd al-Munim al-Janabi (Arabic: عدنان عبد المنعم الجنابي) is an Iraqi politician, tribal leader and economist, as a Minister of State in the Iraqi Interim Government, June 2004–January 2005

== Life and career ==
Al-Janabi was born in Musayyib, south of Baghdad, to a Sunni Arab family. His brother was a senior official in the government of Saddam Hussein.

Earning a B.Sc. in economics from the University of London and an M.Sc. petroleum technology in economics from Loughborough University He worked in the government-controlled oil industry of Iraq in the 1970s and 1980s. In 1996 he was elected to Iraq's National Assembly. After the overthrow of the government of Saddam Hussein, al-Janabi served as minister of state without portfolio in the Iraqi Interim Government. He was campaign manager of the Iraqi List for the Iraqi legislative election of January 2005. He resigned in January 2005 in protest against being handcuffed by U.S. troops at a roadblock.

He was elected to the Council of Representatives of Iraq in the January 2005 elections and became the deputy chairman of the Committee set up by the Iraqi Transitional Government to draft a permanent constitution of Iraq. Adnan Al-Janabi was re-elected to the Council of Representatives in the election of march 7th 2010. He was among the leading candidates of the"IRAQIA" list for Baghdad province.

In 2014, Aljanabi was re-elected in the Iraqi parliament.

Al-Janabi is president of Iraq Centre For Research And Studies. He is the chief sheikh of Al-Janabi tribe, one of the most important tribes of Iraq.

Adnan al-Janabi is the father of Salam al-Janabi, better known as Salam Pax, whose English-language weblog "Where is Raed?" became famous at the time of the 2003 invasion of Iraq.

== Professional experience ==
- 2018 Retired, Head of the Iraqi Research and Studies Center (MOBDII)
- 2014 Re-elected to the Council of Representatives from Babylon
- 2010 Member of the Council of Representatives. Chairman of Oil and Energy Committee
- 2006 President of the Iraq Center for Research and Studies
- 2005–2006 Member of The National Assembly, Chairman of the Finance Committee, Vice Chairman of the Constitution Drafting Committee
- 2004–2005 Minister of State, Government of Iraq
- 1996–2003 Independent Member of the National Assembly (Parliament) of Iraq
- 1997–2003 External lecturer in the National Institute for Administrative Development, Iraq. • 1990-1995 Independent Consultant in Vienna & Baghdad
- 1988–1990 Resident Consultant in Vienna, with Center for Global Energy Studies, London
- 1982–2003 C.E.O. and partner in several companies in the private sector
- 1981–1982 Director of Foreign Relations and Investment, Ministry of Oil, Iraq
- 1976–1981 Head of Economics and Finance Dept. OPEC, Vienna
- 1975–1976 Adviser, Ministry of Oil, Iraq
- 1974–1976 Part-time lecturer, Chemical Engineering Dept, Baghdad University
- 1972–1974 Head of Crude Oil Marketing, INOC
- 1970–1972 Head of Crude Oil Transportation Section, INOC
- 1969–1970 Study leave in UK
- 1967–1969 Economist, Iraq National Oil Company
- 1965–1967 Central Bank of Iraq, Research Dept, in charge of relations with IMF and World Bank
- 1964–1965 Iraqi News Agency, Editor of economic Bulletin and Oil Bulletin

== Publications ==
Papers on the theory and practice of oil pricing and production, and exhaustible resources etc. in US, UK, European and Arab-world technical journals •2013: The Rentier State and dictatorship (in Arabic) •2013: The Need For Cooperation Between, Producers & Consumers, with Dr Luay Al-Khateeb •2015: Launched IRAQIPEDIA, the Iraqi open encyclopedia •2016, published Getting Rid of the Rentier State (in Arabic)

== Energy highlights ==
- After joining INOC in 1967, worked with the oil sector planning committee as coordinator and as head of transport section overseeing the purchase of the first five tankers and establishment of the Iraq Tanker Company; member of the board of ITC and the Arab Tanker Company
- Took part in negotiations with IPC in 1971 that led to the 1972 nationalization; headed Crude Oil Marketing, later SOMO; took part in all OPEC ministerial conferences, 19681981.
- After a confrontation with Saddam Hussein in 1975 over marketing policy, went to Vienna in 1976 and joined the OPEC Secretariat as Head of Economics and Finance, overseeing the creation of the OPEC Fund.
- Returned to Iraq in 1981 as DG of Foreign Relations and Investments, but soon fell out with the Baathist regime and resigned with no pension.
- Helped to establish the Vienna branch of the Centre for Global Energy Studies, headed by Sheikh Ahmad Zaki Yamani and directed by Dr. Fadhil Al-Chalabi.
- Continued research and publishing and participation in conferences on energy matters. Lecturer on oil matters at Baghdad University and the Institute of Management for senior officials in the Ministry of Planning
- Minister and member of the Ministerial Oil and Gas Council in the Interim Government headed by Dr Allawi
- In the National Assembly, Vice Chairman of the Constitution Drafting Committee and Head of Finance Committee
- In the 2010–2014 Parliament, headed the Oil and Energy Committee.
- Took part in drafting INOC law passed on 5 March 2018.
