= Iona Craig =

British-Irish journalist

- Born: 1976 (age 49–50)
- Education: City University London
- Occupation: Journalist
- Writing career
- Notable awards: Martha Gellhorn Prize for Journalism, Orwell Prize for Journalism, George Polk Awards for Foreign Reporting
- Website: www.ionacraig.com

Iona Craig (born 1976) is a British-Irish freelance journalist. Since 2010 her reporting has focused on Yemen and the Arabian Peninsula.

She is the great-granddaughter of Sir James Craig, an Independent TD, and a cousin of Jeremy Craig, former Irish Ambassador to Lebanon.

== Career ==
Craig was raised in Gloucestershire, United Kingdom, and attended City University in London. Previous to her study and work as a journalist, Craig was a horse trainer and jockey. She was Assistant Trainer to Champion Trainer Nicky Henderson.

As a BBC intern, Craig studied Arabic, and moved to Sanaa, Yemen, in 2010 to become an editor at the Yemen Times. As the Yemeni revolution began in February 2011 she left the Yemen Times to concentrate on freelance reporting including as Yemen correspondent for The Times of London. In 2014 she was the recipient of the Martha Gellhorn prize for her reporting on U.S. drone strikes in Yemen including the 12 December 2013 bombing of a wedding convoy.

On 27 February 2013, Craig survived an assassination attempt when the taxi she was travelling in was ambushed and came under fire outside the Ministry of Defense headquarters in Sanaa. The taxi driver also survived. His quick thinking likely saved Craig's life.

The last accredited Western journalist living in the country, she left in 2014. Since then she has repeatedly returned to report on the Yemen civil war, human rights abuses and the country's humanitarian crisis from both sides of the frontlines for radio, print and TV. In 2017, she reported on the United States Navy SEALs Yakla raid, for which she won the Foreign Reporting prize at the 2018 George Polk Awards.

Her work has appeared in The Times, The Sunday Times, The Irish Times, USA Today, Al Jazeera America, Time (magazine), Foreign Policy, Los Angeles Times, GlobalPost, Index on Censorship, The Intercept, National Geographic, The New Statesman and Vice, amongst others.

Craig is also the volunteer spokesperson for the Yemen Data Project.

== Awards and accolades ==
- 2014 Martha Gellhorn Prize for Journalism - winner. Judges wrote of her work: “Often alone, and risking her life, Iona has for almost four years given voice to the ordinary people of Yemen, especially the families of the victims of America’s ‘war on terror’."
- 2014 Frontline Club Award - print winner. Craig won the award for her investigation into a US drone attack that left 12 civilians dead. To write the piece, she courageously travelled undercover to the strike site six days after the bombing of a wedding convoy in remote central Yemen.
- 2016 The Orwell Prize for journalism - winner.
- 2016 Kurt Schork Memorial Awards - international journalism winner. Craig was commended for the undercover stories from Yemen.
- 2017 International Media Awards - winner. Craig won the Cutting Edge Award for her work on the Yemeni Crisis. The award is given to journalists who have recently risen to prominence due to the outstanding quality of their work.
- 2018 George Polk Award for Foreign Reporting - winner.
- 2018 James Foley Medill Medal for Courage in Journalism runner-up
- 2018 Overseas Press Club of America Awards, Roy Rowan Award runner-up.
