= Bibi van der Zee =

Bibi van der Zee (born 1970s, London) is a political activist and journalist.

Van der Zee is the daughter of the Dutch journalist and author Henri van der Zee (1935–2013) and the British journalist Barbara Griggs. She is a regular columnist for New Statesman and The Guardian.

== Bibliography ==
- Green Business: Sustainability, Resources, People, Planet, Profit (Essential Managers) (2008)
- Rebel, Rebel: The Protestor's Handbook (2008)
- The Protestor's Handbook (2010)
