= C. Van Der Zee House =

Historic house in New York, United States

- U.S. National Register of Historic Places
- Location within New York Location within the United States
- Location: NY 143 at Blossom Hill Rd., Coeymans Hollow, New York
- Coordinates: 42°28′11″N 73°52′46″W
- Area: 10 acres (4.0 ha)
- Built: 1850
- Architectural style: Greek Revival
- NRHP reference No.: 01001434
- Added to NRHP: January 11, 2002

C. Van Der Zee House is a historic home located at Coeymans Hollow in Albany County, New York. It was built about 1850 and is a rectangular, two story heavy timber frame dwelling on a random coursed rubblestone foundation. It has a one-story gable roofed wing. It has a Greek Revival style recessed entry door. Also on the property are a barn (c. 1850), fruit barn (c. 1870), barn foundation (c. 1850), shed (c. 1870), and a chicken coop (c. 1870).

It was listed on the National Register of Historic Places in 2002.
