= The Guardian =

British national daily newspaper

- Front page on 26 December 2025
- Type: Daily newspaper
- Format: Broadsheet (1821–2005); Berliner (2005–2018); Compact (since 2018)
- Owner: Guardian Media Group
- Founder: John Edward Taylor
- Publisher: Guardian Media Group
- Editor-in-chief: Katharine Viner
- Founded: 5 May 1821; 205 years ago (as The Manchester Guardian, renamed The Guardian in 1959)
- Political alignment: Centre-left
- Language: English
- Headquarters: Kings Place, London
- Country: United Kingdom
- Circulation: 105,134 (as of July 2021)
- Sister newspapers: The Observer (1993–2025); The Guardian Weekly
- ISSN: 0261-3077 (print); 1756-3224 (web)
- OCLC number: 60623878
- Website: theguardian.com

The Guardian is a British daily newspaper. It was founded in Manchester in 1821 as The Manchester Guardian and changed its name in 1959, followed by a move to London. Along with its sister paper, The Guardian Weekly, The Guardian is part of the Guardian Media Group, owned by the Scott Trust Limited. The trust was created in 1936 to "secure the financial and editorial independence of The Guardian in perpetuity and to safeguard the journalistic freedom and liberal values of The Guardian free from commercial or political interference". The trust was converted into a limited company in 2008, with a constitution written so as to maintain for The Guardian the same protections as were built into the structure of the Scott Trust by its creators. Profits are reinvested in its journalism rather than distributed to owners or shareholders. It is considered a newspaper of record in the UK.

The editor-in-chief Katharine Viner succeeded Alan Rusbridger in 2015. Since 2018, the paper's main newsprint sections have been published in tabloid format. In July 2021, the latest month for which figures are available, its print edition had a daily circulation of 105,134. The newspaper is available online; it lists UK, US (founded in 2011), Australian (founded in 2013), European, and International editions, and its website has sections for World, Europe, US, Americas, Asia, Australia, Middle East, Africa, New Zealand, Inequality, and Global development. It is published Monday–Saturday, though from 1993 to 2025 The Observer served as its Sunday sister paper.

The paper's readership is generally on the centre-left of British political opinion. In an Ipsos MORI research poll in September 2018 designed to interrogate the public's trust of specific titles online, The Guardian scored highest for digital-content news, with 84% of readers agreeing that they "trust what [they] see in it". A December 2018 report of a poll by the Publishers Audience Measurement Company stated that the paper's print edition was found to be the most trusted in the UK in the period from October 2017 to September 2018. It was also reported to be the most-read of the UK's "quality newsbrands", including digital editions; other "quality" brands included The Times, The Daily Telegraph, The Independent, and The i Paper. While The Guardian's print circulation is in decline, the report indicated that news from The Guardian, including that reported online, reaches more than 23 million UK adults each month.

Chief among the notable "scoops" obtained by the paper was the 2011 News International phone-hacking scandal—and in particular the hacking of the murdered English teenager Milly Dowler's telephone. The investigation led to the closure of the News of the World, the UK's best-selling Sunday newspaper and one of the highest-circulation newspapers in history. In June 2013, The Guardian broke news of the secret collection by the Obama administration of Verizon telephone records, and subsequently revealed the existence of the surveillance program PRISM after knowledge of it was leaked to the paper by the whistleblower and former National Security Agency contractor Edward Snowden. In 2016, The Guardian led an investigation into the Panama Papers, exposing then-prime minister David Cameron's links to offshore bank accounts. It has been named "newspaper of the year" four times at the annual British Press Awards, most recently in 2023.

== History ==
=== 1821 to 1972 ===
==== Early years ====
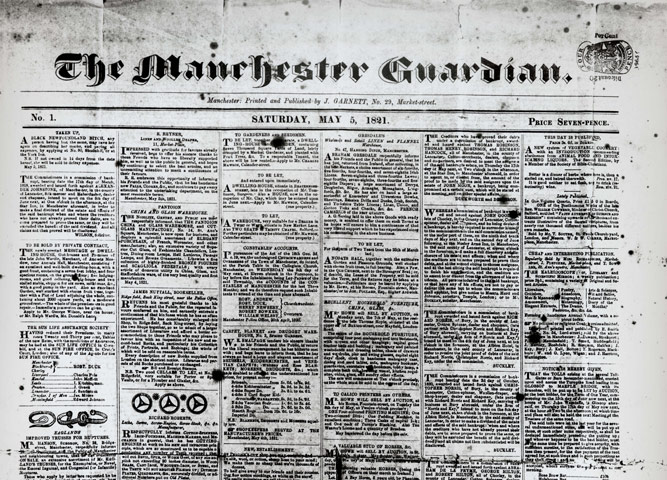
Manchester Guardian Prospectus, 1821

The Manchester Guardian was founded in Manchester in 1821 by cotton merchant John Edward Taylor with backing from the Little Circle, a group of non-conformist businessmen. They launched the paper, on 5 May 1821 (by chance the very day of Napoleon's death) after the police closure of the more radical Manchester Observer, a paper that had championed the cause of the Peterloo massacre protesters. Taylor had been hostile to the radical reformers, writing: "They have appealed not to the reason but the passions and the suffering of their abused and credulous fellow-countrymen, from whose ill-requited industry they extort for themselves the means of a plentiful and comfortable existence. They do not toil, neither do they spin, but they live better than those that do." When the government closed down the Manchester Observer, the mill-owners' champions had the upper hand.

The influential journalist Jeremiah Garnett joined Taylor during the establishment of the paper, and all of the Little Circle wrote articles for the new paper. The prospectus announcing the new publication proclaimed that it would "zealously enforce the principles of civil and religious Liberty ... warmly advocate the cause of Reform ... endeavour to assist in the diffusion of just principles of Political Economy and ... support, without reference to the party from which they emanate, all serviceable measures". In 1825, the paper merged with the British Volunteer and was known as The Manchester Guardian and British Volunteer until 1828.

The working-class Manchester and Salford Advertiser called The Manchester Guardian "the foul prostitute and dirty parasite of the worst portion of the mill-owners". The Manchester Guardian was generally hostile to labour's claims. Of the 1832 Ten Hours Bill, the paper doubted whether in view of the foreign competition "the passing of a law positively enacting a gradual destruction of the cotton manufacture in this kingdom would be a much less rational procedure." The Manchester Guardian dismissed strikes as the work of outside agitators, stating that "if an accommodation can be effected, the occupation of the agents of the Union is gone. They live on strife ... ."

In March 2023, an academic review commissioned by the Scott Trust determined that John Edward Taylor and nine of his eleven backers had links to the Atlantic slave trade through their interests in Manchester's textile industry.

==== Slavery and the American Civil War ====
The newspaper opposed slavery and supported free trade. An 1823 leading article on the continuing "cruelty and injustice" to slaves in the West Indies long after the abolition of the slave trade with the Slave Trade Act 1807 wanted fairness to the interests and claims both of the planters and of their oppressed slaves. It welcomed the Slavery Abolition Act 1833 and accepted the "increased compensation" to the planters as the "guilt of slavery attaches far more to the nation" rather than individuals. Success of the Act would encourage emancipation in other slave-owning nations to avoid "imminent risk of a violent and bloody termination". However, the newspaper argued against restricting trade with countries that had not yet abolished slavery.

Complex tensions developed in the United States. When the abolitionist George Thompson toured, the newspaper said that "[s]lavery is a monstrous evil, but civil war is not a less one; and we would not seek the abolition even of the former through the imminent hazard of the latter". It suggested that the United States should compensate slave-owners for freeing slaves and called on President Franklin Pierce to resolve the 1856 "civil war", the Sacking of Lawrence due to pro-slavery laws imposed by Congress.

In 1860, The Observer quoted a report that the newly elected president Abraham Lincoln was opposed to abolition of slavery. On 13 May 1861, shortly after the start of the American Civil War, the Manchester Guardian portrayed the Northern states as primarily imposing a burdensome trade monopoly on the Confederate States, arguing that if the South was freed to have direct trade with Europe, "the day would not be distant when slavery itself would cease". Therefore, the newspaper asked "Why should the South be prevented from freeing itself from slavery?" This hopeful view was also held by the Liberal leader William Ewart Gladstone.

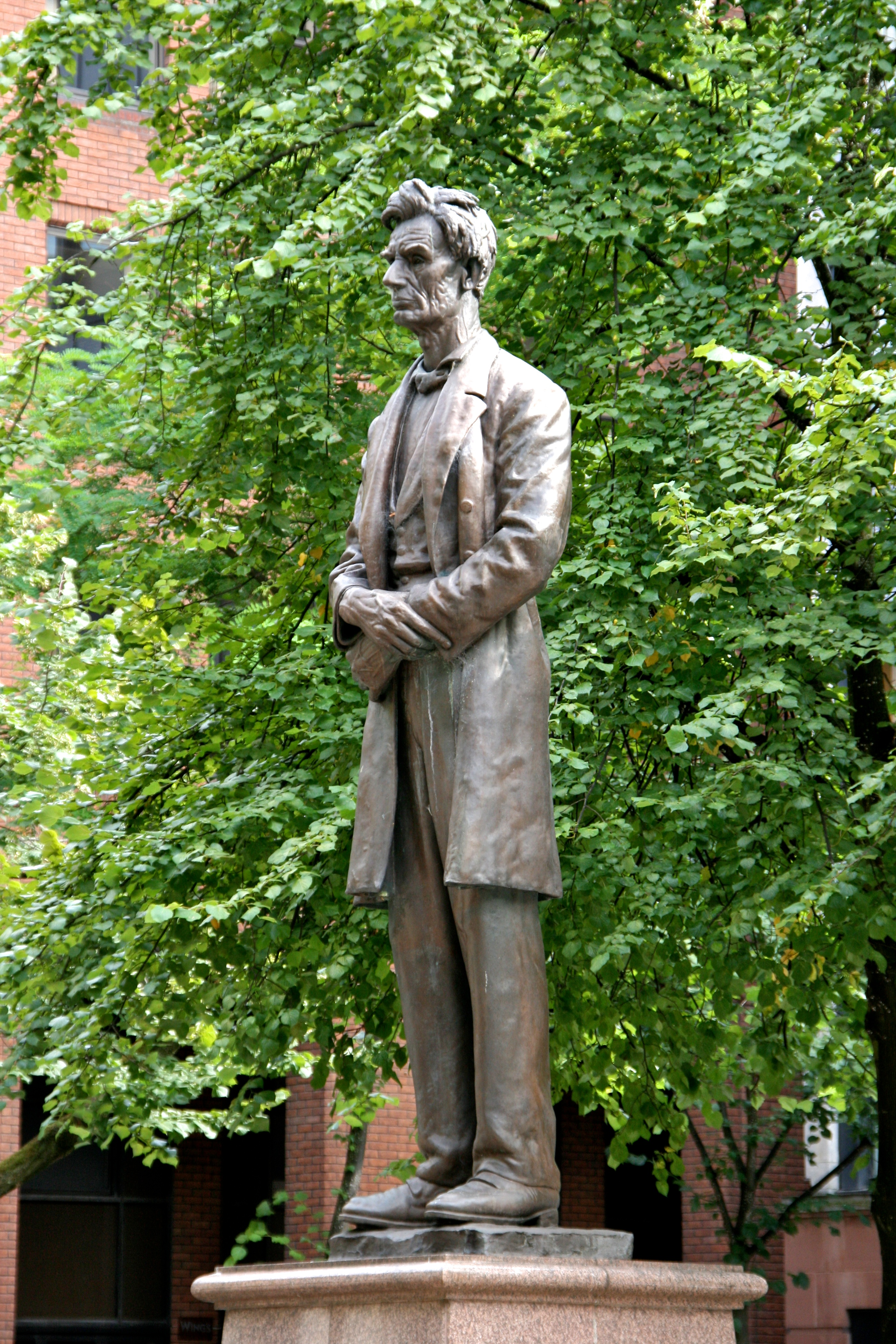
Statue of Abraham Lincoln in Manchester, with extracts from the working men's letter and his reply on its base

There was division in Britain over the Civil War, even within political parties. The Manchester Guardian had also been conflicted. It had supported other independence movements and felt it should also support the rights of the Confederacy to self-determination. It criticised Lincoln's Emancipation Proclamation for not freeing all American slaves. On 10 October 1862, it wrote: "It is impossible to cast any reflections upon a man so evidently sincere and well-intentioned as Mr Lincoln but it is also impossible not to feel that it was an evil day both for America and the world, when he was chosen President of the United States". By then, the Union blockade was causing suffering in British towns. Some including Liverpool supported the Confederacy as did "current opinion in all classes" in London. On 31 December 1862, cotton workers held a meeting at the Free Trade Hall in Manchester which resolved "its detestation of negro slavery in America, and of the attempt of the rebellious Southern slave-holders to organise on the great American continent a nation having slavery as its basis". There was a comment that "an effort had been made in a leading article of the Manchester Guardian to deter the working men from assembling together for such a purpose". The newspaper reported all this and published their letter to President Lincoln while complaining that "the chief occupation, if not the chief object of the meeting, seems to have been to abuse the Manchester Guardian". Lincoln replied to the letter thanking the workers for their "sublime Christian heroism" and American ships delivered relief supplies to Britain.

The newspaper reported the shock to the community of the assassination of Abraham Lincoln in 1865, concluding that "[t]he parting of his family with the dying President is too sad for description", but in what from today's perspective looks an ill-judged editorial wrote that "[o]f his rule we can never speak except as a series of acts abhorrent to every true notion of constitutional right and human liberty", adding: "it is doubtless to be regretted that he had not the opportunity of vindicating his good intentions".

According to Martin Kettle, writing for The Guardian in February 2011: "The Guardian had always hated slavery. But it doubted the Union hated slavery to the same degree. It argued that the Union had always tacitly condoned slavery by shielding the southern slave states from the condemnation they deserved. It was critical of Lincoln's emancipation proclamation for stopping short of a full repudiation of slavery throughout the US. And it chastised the president for being so willing to negotiate with the south, with slavery one of the issues still on the table."

==== C. P. Scott ====
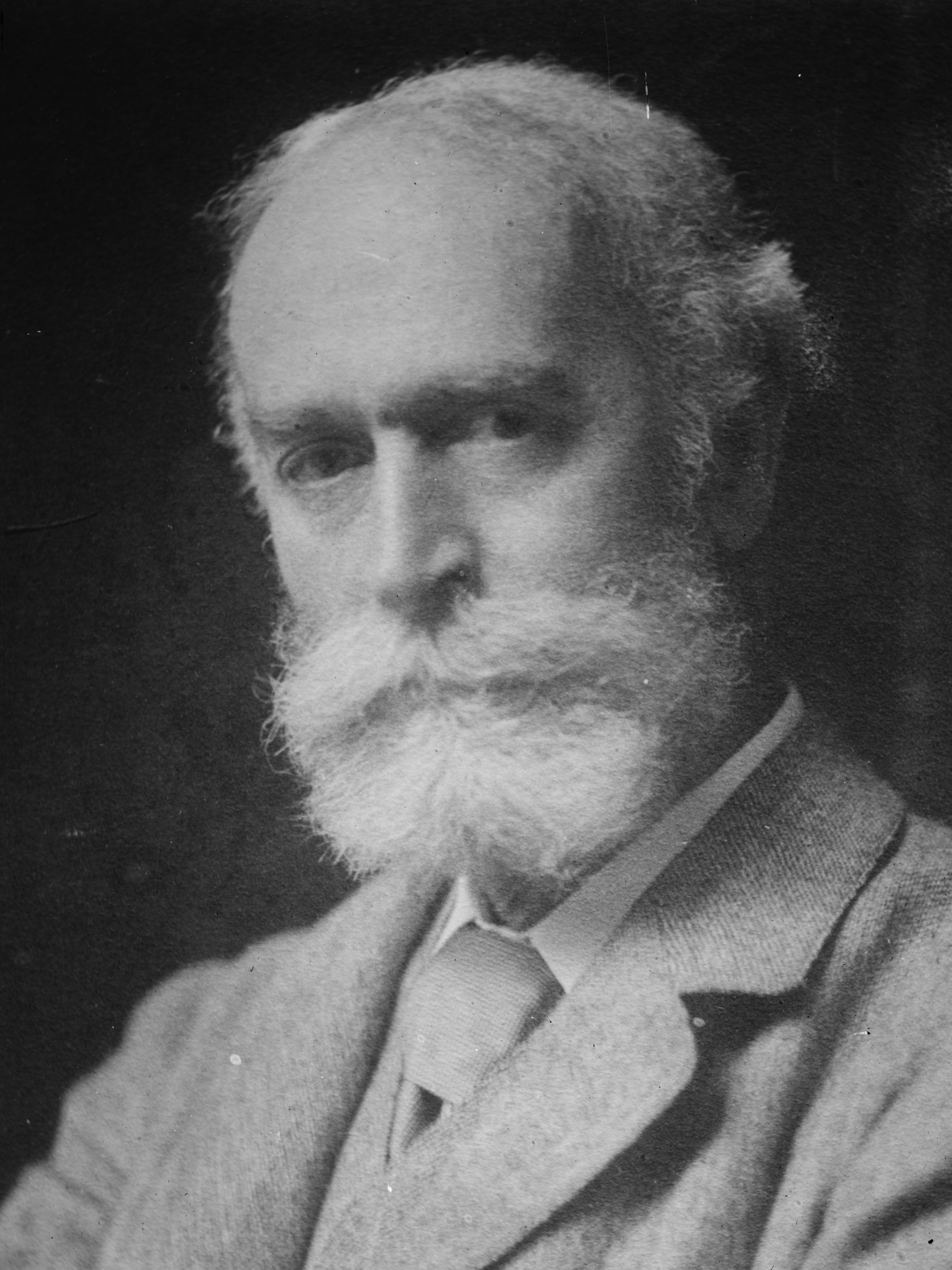
C. P. Scott in 1919

C. P. Scott made the newspaper nationally recognised. He was editor for 57 years from 1872, and became its owner when he bought the paper from the estate of Taylor's son in 1907. Under Scott, the paper's moderate editorial line became more radical, supporting William Gladstone when the Liberals split in 1886, and opposing the Second Boer War against popular opinion. Scott supported the movement for women's suffrage, but was critical of any tactics by the suffragettes that involved direct action: "The really ludicrous position is that Mr Lloyd George is fighting to enfranchise seven million women and the militants are smashing unoffending people's windows and breaking up benevolent societies' meetings in a desperate effort to prevent him." Scott thought the Suffragettes' "courage and devotion" was "worthy of a better cause and saner leadership". It has been argued that Scott's criticism reflected a widespread disdain, at the time, for those women who "transgressed the gender expectations of Edwardian society".

Scott commissioned J. M. Synge and his friend Jack Yeats to produce articles and drawings documenting the social conditions of the west of Ireland; these pieces were published in 1911 in the collection Travels in Wicklow, West Kerry and Connemara.

Scott's friendship with Chaim Weizmann played a role in the Balfour Declaration. In 1948 The Manchester Guardian was a supporter of the new State of Israel.

Ownership of the paper passed in June 1936 to the Scott Trust (named after the last owner, John Russell Scott, who was the first chairman of the Trust). This move ensured the paper's independence.

From 1930 to 1967, a special archival copy of all the daily newspapers was preserved in 700 zinc cases. These were found in 1988 while the newspaper's archives were deposited at the University of Manchester's John Rylands University Library, on the Oxford Road campus. The first case was opened and found to contain the newspapers issued in August 1930 in pristine condition. The zinc cases had been made each month by the newspaper's plumber and stored for posterity. The other 699 cases were not opened and were all returned to storage at The Guardian's garage, owing to shortage of space at the library.

==== Spanish Civil War ====
Traditionally affiliated with the centrist to centre-left Liberal Party, and with a northern, non-conformist circulation base, the paper earned a national reputation and the respect of the left during the Spanish Civil War (1936–1939). George Orwell wrote in Homage to Catalonia (1938): "Of our larger papers, the Manchester Guardian is the only one that leaves me with an increased respect for its honesty". With the pro-Liberal News Chronicle, the Labour-supporting Daily Herald, the Communist Party's Daily Worker and several Sunday and weekly papers, it supported the Republican government against General Francisco Franco's insurgent nationalists.

==== Post-war ====
The paper's then editor, A. P. Wadsworth, so loathed Labour's left-wing champion Aneurin Bevan, who had made a reference to getting rid of "Tory Vermin" in a speech "and the hate-gospellers of his entourage" that it encouraged readers to vote Conservative in the 1951 general election and remove Clement Attlee's post-war Labour government.

The Manchester Guardian strongly opposed military intervention during the 1956 Suez Crisis: "The Anglo-French ultimatum to Egypt is an act of folly, without justification in any terms but brief expediency. It pours petrol on a growing fire. There is no knowing what kind of explosion will follow."

On 24 August 1959, The Manchester Guardian changed its name to The Guardian. This change reflected the growing prominence of national and international affairs in the newspaper. In September 1961, The Guardian, which had previously only been published in Manchester, began to be printed in London. Nesta Roberts was appointed as the newspaper's first news editor there, becoming the first woman to hold such a position on a British national newspaper.

=== 1972 to 2000 ===
==== The Troubles ====
During the early period of the Troubles in Northern Ireland, The Guardian supported British state intervention to quell disturbances between Irish Catholics and Ulster loyalists. After the 1969 Battle of the Bogside between Catholic residents of Derry and the Royal Ulster Constabulary (RUC), The Guardian called for the British Armed Forces to be deployed to the region, arguing that their deployment would "present a more disinterested face of law and order" than the RUC. The Army was deployed from 1969.

On 30 January 1972, troops from the 1st Battalion, Parachute Regiment opened fire on a Northern Ireland Civil Rights Association march, killing fourteen people in an event that came to be known as Bloody Sunday. In response to the incident, The Guardian argued that "Neither side can escape condemnation... The organisers of the demonstration, Miss Bernadette Devlin among them, deliberately challenged the ban on marches. They knew that stone throwing and sniping could not be prevented, and that the IRA might use the crowd as a shield." The Guardian further stated that "It is certainly true that the army cordons had endured a wanton barrage of stones, steel bars, and other missiles. That still does not justify opening fire so freely."

After the events of Bloody Sunday, John Widgery, Baron Widgery was appointed the head of a tribunal to investigate the killings. The resulting tribunal, known as the Widgery Tribunal, largely exonerated the actions of the soldiers involved in the incident. The Guardian published an article on 20 April 1972 which supported the tribunal and its findings, arguing that "Widgery's report is not one-sided". In response to the introduction of internment without trial in Northern Ireland, The Guardian argued that "Internment without trial is hateful, repressive and undemocratic. In the existing Irish situation, most regrettably, it is also inevitable... To remove the ringleaders, in the hope that the atmosphere might calm down, is a step to which there is no obvious alternative."

==== Sarah Tisdall ====
In 1983, the paper was at the centre of a controversy surrounding documents regarding the stationing of cruise missiles in Britain that were leaked to The Guardian by civil servant Sarah Tisdall. The paper eventually complied with a court order to hand over the documents to the authorities, which led to a six-month prison sentence for Tisdall. "I still blame myself", said Peter Preston, who was the editor of The Guardian at the time, but he went on to argue that the paper had no choice because it "believed in the rule of law". In a 2019 article discussing Julian Assange and the protection of sources by journalists, John Pilger criticised the editor of The Guardian for betraying Tisdall by choosing not to go to prison "on a fundamental principle of protecting a source".

==== The Observer ====
The Guardian Media Group acquired the Sunday newspaper The Observer in June 1993, after a rival acquisition bid by The Independent was rejected. This extended the Guardian's publishing to 7 days a week. While the Observer continued to operate as a separate published newspaper with its own editorial team and journalists, over time its digital content became part of The Guardian's online presence. The Observer was sold to Tortoise Media, effective from April 2025.

==== Alleged penetration by Russian intelligence ====
In 1994, KGB defector Oleg Gordievsky identified Guardian literary editor Richard Gott as "an agent of influence". While Gott denied that he received cash, he admitted he had had lunch at the Soviet Embassy and had taken benefits from the KGB on overseas visits. Gott resigned from his post.

Gordievsky commented on the newspaper: "The KGB loved The Guardian. It was deemed highly susceptible to penetration."

==== Jonathan Aitken ====
In 1995, both the Granada Television programme World in Action and The Guardian were sued for libel by the cabinet minister Jonathan Aitken, for their allegation that Harrods owner Mohamed Al Fayed had paid for Aitken and his wife to stay at the Hôtel Ritz in Paris, essentially a bribe to Aitken. Aitken publicly stated that he would fight with "the simple sword of truth and the trusty shield of British fair play". The court case proceeded, and in 1997 The Guardian produced evidence that Aitken's claim of his wife paying for the hotel stay was untrue. In 1999, Aitken was jailed for perjury and perverting the course of justice.

==== Connection ====
In May 1998, a series of Guardian investigations exposed that a much-garlanded ITV documentary The Connection produced by Carlton Television was mostly fabricated.

The documentary purported to film an undiscovered route by which heroin was smuggled into the United Kingdom from Colombia. An internal inquiry at Carlton found that The Guardian's allegations were in large part correct, and the regulator Independent Television Commission (ITC) punished Carlton with a record £2 million fine for multiple breaches of the UK's broadcasting codes. The scandal led to an impassioned debate about the accuracy of documentary production. In June 1998 The Guardian revealed further fabrications in another Carlton documentary by the same director.

==== Kosovo War ====
The paper supported NATO's military intervention in the Kosovo War in 1998–1999. The Guardian stated that "the only honourable course for Europe and America is to use military force". Mary Kaldor's piece was headlined "Bombs away! But to save civilians, we must get in some soldiers too."

=== Since 2000 ===
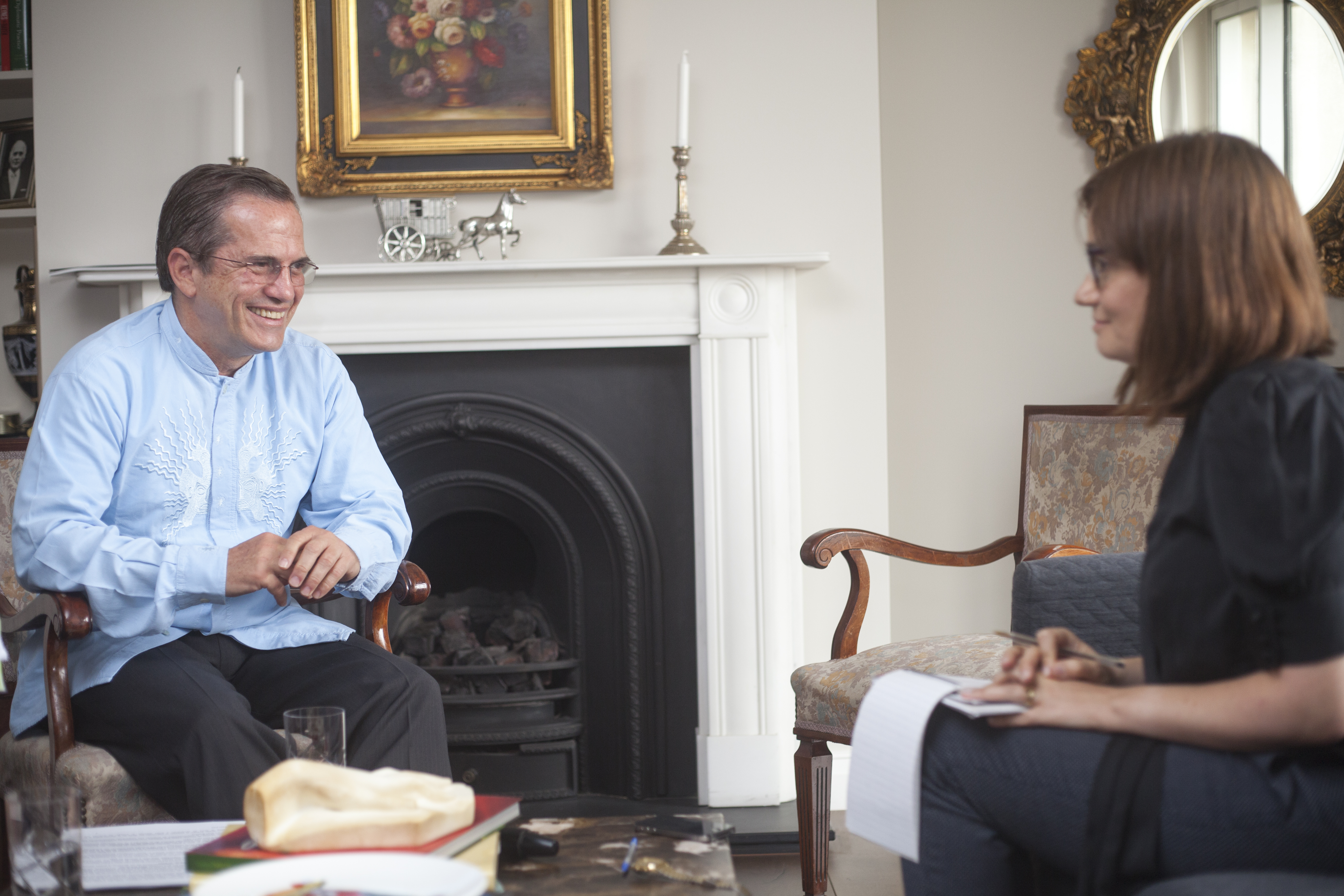
The Guardian senior news writer Esther Addley interviewing Ecuadorian foreign minister Ricardo Patiño for an article relating to Julian Assange in 2014

In the early 2000s, The Guardian challenged the Act of Settlement 1701 and the Treason Felony Act 1848. In October 2004, The Guardian published a humorous column by Charlie Brooker in its entertainment guide, the final sentence of which was viewed by some as a call for violence against US President George W. Bush; after a controversy, Brooker and the paper issued an apology, saying the "closing comments were intended as an ironic joke, not as a call to action".

Following the 7 July 2005 London bombings, The Guardian published an article on its comment pages by Dilpazier Aslam, a 27-year-old British Muslim and journalism trainee from Yorkshire. Aslam was a member of Hizb ut-Tahrir, an Islamist group, and had published a number of articles on their website. According to the newspaper, it did not know that Aslam was a member of Hizb ut-Tahrir when he applied to become a trainee, though several staff members were informed of this once he started at the paper. The Home Office said that the group's "ultimate aim is the establishment of an Islamic state (Caliphate), according to Hizb ut-Tahrir via non-violent means". The Guardian asked Aslam to resign his membership of the group and, when he did not do so, terminated his employment.

In early 2009, The Guardian started a tax investigation into a number of major UK companies, including publishing a database of the tax paid by the FTSE 100 companies. Internal documents relating to Barclays Bank's tax avoidance were removed from The Guardian website after Barclays obtained a gagging order. The newspaper played a pivotal role in exposing the depth of the News of the World phone hacking affair. The Economist's Intelligent Life magazine opined that:

As Watergate is to [The] Washington Post, and thalidomide to [The] Sunday Times, so phone-hacking will surely be to The Guardian: a defining moment in its history.

==== Israeli-Palestinian conflict coverage ====
In recent decades, The Guardian has been accused of biased criticism of Israeli government policy and of bias against the Palestinians. In December 2003, columnist Julie Burchill cited "striking bias against the state of Israel" as one of the reasons she left the paper for The Times.

Responding to these accusations, a Guardian editorial in 2002 condemned antisemitism and defended the paper's right to criticise the policies and actions of the Israeli government, arguing that those who view such criticism as inherently anti-Jewish are mistaken. Harriet Sherwood, then The Guardian's foreign editor and later its Jerusalem correspondent, has also denied that The Guardian has an anti-Israel bias, saying that the paper aims to cover all viewpoints in the Israeli–Palestinian conflict.

On 6 November 2011, Chris Elliott, The Guardian's readers' editor, wrote that "Guardian reporters, writers and editors must be more vigilant about the language they use when writing about Jews or Israel", citing recent cases where The Guardian received complaints regarding language chosen to describe Jews or Israel. Elliott noted that, over nine months, he upheld complaints regarding language in certain articles that were seen as anti-Semitic, revising the language and footnoting this change.

The Guardian's style guide section referred to Tel Aviv as the capital of Israel in 2012. In 2012, media watchdog HonestReporting filed a complaint with the Press Complaints Commission (PCC) after The Guardian ran a correction apologising for "wrongly" having called Jerusalem as Israel's capital. After an initial ruling supporting The Guardian, the PCC retracted its original ruling, leading to the newspaper's acknowledgement that it was wrong to call Tel Aviv Israel's capital.The Guardian later clarified: "In 1980, the Israeli Knesset enacted a law designating the city of Jerusalem, including East Jerusalem, as the country's capital. In response, the UN Security Council issued resolution 478, censuring the 'change in character and status of the Holy City of Jerusalem' and calling on all member states with diplomatic missions in the city to withdraw. The UN has reaffirmed this position on several occasions, and almost every country now has its embassy in Tel Aviv. While it was therefore right to issue a correction to make clear Israel's designation of Jerusalem as its capital is not recognised by the international community, we accept that it is wrong to state that Tel Aviv – the country's financial and diplomatic centre – is the capital. The style guide has been amended accordingly."

On 11 August 2014 the print edition of The Guardian published a pro-Israeli advocacy advert during the 2014 Israel–Gaza conflict featuring Elie Wiesel, headed by the words "Jews rejected child sacrifice 3,500 years ago. Now it's Hamas' turn." The Times had decided against running the ad, although it had already appeared in major American newspapers. One week later, Chris Elliott expressed the opinion that the newspaper should have rejected the language used in the advert and should have negotiated with the advertiser on this matter.

In October 2023, The Guardian stated it would not renew the contract of cartoonist Steve Bell after he submitted a cartoon featuring Netanyahu, with his shirt open, wearing boxing gloves and holding a scalpel over a dotted shape of the Gaza Strip on his stomach. The caption read: "Residents of Gaza, get out now." Due to what has been seen by some as a reference to Shakespeare's Shylock's "pound of flesh", it prompted accusations that it was antisemitic. Bell said that he was inspired by the 1960s "Johnson's Scar" cartoon by David Levine of US president Lyndon B Johnson within the context of the Vietnam War.

==== Clark County ====
In August 2004, for the US presidential election, the daily G2 supplement launched an experimental letter-writing campaign in Clark County, Ohio, an average-sized county in a swing state. Editor Ian Katz bought a voter list from the county for $25 and asked readers to write to people listed as undecided in the election, giving them an impression of the international view and the importance of voting against President George W. Bush. Katz admitted later that he did not believe Democrats who warned that the campaign would benefit Bush and not his opponent, John Kerry. The newspaper scrapped "Operation Clark County" on 21 October 2004 after first publishing a column of responses—nearly all of them outraged—to the campaign under the headline "Dear Limey assholes". Some commentators suggested that the public's dislike of the campaign contributed to Bush's victory in Clark County.

==== International editions ====
In 2007, the paper launched Guardian America, an attempt to capitalise on its large online readership in the United States, which at the time stood at more than 5.9 million. The company hired former American Prospect editor, New York magazine columnist and New York Review of Books writer Michael Tomasky to head the project and hire a staff of American reporters and web editors. The site featured news from The Guardian that was relevant to an American audience: coverage of US news and the Middle East, for example.

Tomasky stepped down from his position as editor of Guardian America in February 2009, ceding editing and planning duties to other US and London staff. He retained his position as a columnist and blogger, taking the title editor-at-large.

In October 2009, the company abandoned the Guardian America homepage, instead directing users to a US news index page on the main Guardian website. The following month, the company laid off six American employees, including a reporter, a multimedia producer and four web editors. The move came as Guardian News and Media opted to reconsider its US strategy amid a huge effort to cut costs across the company. In subsequent years, however, The Guardian has hired various commentators on US affairs including Ana Marie Cox, Michael Wolff, Naomi Wolf, Glenn Greenwald and George W. Bush's former speechwriter Josh Treviño. Treviño's first blog post was an apology for a controversial tweet posted in June 2011 over the second Gaza flotilla, the controversy which had been revived by the appointment.

Guardian US launched in September 2011, led by editor-in-chief Janine Gibson, which replaced the previous Guardian America service. After a period during which Katharine Viner served as the US editor-in-chief before taking charge of Guardian News and Media as a whole, Viner's former deputy, Lee Glendinning, was appointed to succeed her as head of the American operation at the beginning of June 2015.

The Guardian later launched Australian and "International" digital editions in 2013 and 2015 respectively. In September 2023, a European digital edition was launched, part of the newspaper's efforts to be "even more European in its perspective, not less" after Brexit. Ten journalists and four columnists were initially hired for the edition. After a year, European readership increased 15%, with Ireland, Germany, France, Spain, and the Netherlands providing the editions biggest audiences.

==== Gagged from reporting Parliament ====
In October 2009, The Guardian reported that it was forbidden to report on a parliamentary matter, a question recorded in a Commons order paper, to be answered by a minister later that week. The newspaper noted that it was being "forbidden from telling its readers why the paper is prevented—for the first time in memory—from reporting parliament. Legal obstacles, which cannot be identified, involve proceedings, which cannot be mentioned, on behalf of a client who must remain secret. The only fact The Guardian can report is that the case involves the London solicitors Carter-Ruck." The paper further stated that this case appeared "to call into question privileges guaranteeing free speech established under the 1689 Bill of Rights".

The only parliamentary question mentioning Carter-Ruck in the relevant period was by Paul Farrelly MP, in reference to legal action by Barclays and Trafigura. The part of the question referencing Carter-Ruck relates to the latter company's September 2009 gagging order on the publication of a 2006 internal report into the 2006 Côte d'Ivoire toxic waste dump scandal, which involved a class action case that the company only settled in September 2009 after The Guardian published some of the commodity trader's internal emails. The reporting injunction was lifted the next day, as Carter-Ruck withdrew it before The Guardian could challenge it in the High Court. Alan Rusbridger attributed the rapid back-down by Carter-Ruck to postings on Twitter, as did a BBC News Online article.

==== Edward Snowden leaks and intervention by the UK government ====
In June 2013, the newspaper broke news of the secret collection of Verizon telephone records held by Barack Obama's administration and subsequently revealed the existence of the PRISM surveillance program after it was leaked to the paper by former NSA contractor Edward Snowden. The Guardian said a DSMA-Notice had been sent to editors and journalists on 7 June after the first Guardian story about the Snowden documents. It said the DSMA-Notice was being used as an "attempt to censor coverage of surveillance tactics employed by intelligence agencies in the UK and US".

The newspaper was subsequently contacted by the British government's Cabinet Secretary, Sir Jeremy Heywood, under instruction from Prime Minister David Cameron and Deputy Prime Minister Nick Clegg, who ordered that the hard drives containing the information be destroyed. The Guardian's offices were then visited in July 2013 by agents from the UK's GCHQ, who supervised the destruction of the hard drives containing information acquired from Snowden. The Guardian said it had destroyed the hard drives to avoid threatened legal action by the UK government that could have stopped it from reporting on US and British government surveillance contained in the documents.

In June 2014, The Register reported that the information the government sought to suppress by destroying the hard drives related to the location of a "beyond top secret" internet monitoring base in Seeb, Oman, and the close involvement of BT and Cable & Wireless in intercepting internet communications. Julian Assange criticised the newspaper for not publishing the entirety of the content when it had the chance. Rusbridger had initially covered the Snowden documents without the government's supervision, but subsequently sought it, and established an ongoing relationship with the Defence Ministry. The Guardian coverage of Snowden later continued because the information had already been copied outside the United Kingdom, earning the company's US website, The Guardian US, an American Pulitzer Prize for Public Service in 2014. Rusbridger and subsequent chief editors would sit on the government's DSMA-Notice board.

==== Treatment of Julian Assange ====
The Guardian published the US diplomatic cables files and the Guantanamo Bay files in collaboration with Julian Assange and WikiLeaks. When some of the diplomatic cables were made available online in unredacted form, WikiLeaks blamed Guardian journalists David Leigh and Luke Harding for publishing the encryption key to the files in their book WikiLeaks: Inside Julian Assange's War on Secrecy. The Guardian blamed Assange for the release of the unredacted cables.

Journalist Glenn Greenwald, a former contributor to The Guardian, accused The Guardian of publishing false claims about Assange in a report about an interview Assange gave to Italian newspaper La Repubblica. The Guardian article had claimed that Assange had praised Donald Trump and criticised Hillary Clinton and also alleged that Assange had "long had a close relationship with the Putin regime". Greenwald wrote: "This article is about how those [Guardian's] false claims—fabrications, really—were spread all over the internet by journalists, causing hundreds of thousands of people (if not millions) to consume false news". The Guardian later amended its article about Assange to remove the claim about his connection to the Russian government. While Assange was in the Ecuadorian embassy, The Guardian published a number of articles pushing the narrative that there was a link between Assange and the Russian government.

In a November 2018 Guardian article, Luke Harding and Dan Collyns cited anonymous sources which stated that Donald Trump's former campaign manager Paul Manafort held secret meetings with WikiLeaks founder Julian Assange inside the Ecuadorian embassy in London in 2013, 2015, and 2016. The name of a third author, Fernando Villavicencio, was removed from the online version of the story soon after publication. The title of the story was originally "Manafort held secret talks with Assange in Ecuadorian embassy". A few hours after publication, "sources say" was added to the title, and the meeting became an "apparent meeting". One reporter characterised the story, "If it's right, it might be the biggest get this year. If it's wrong, it might be the biggest gaffe." Manafort and Assange both said they had never met, with the latter threatening legal action against The Guardian. Ecuador's London consul Fidel Narváez, who had worked at Ecuador's embassy in London from 2010 to July 2018, said that Manafort had not visited Assange.

Serge Halimi said Harding had a personal grievance against Assange and stated that Manafort's name does not appear in the Ecuadorian embassy's visitors' book and there were no pictures of Manafort entering or leaving "one of the most surveilled and filmed buildings on the planet". The Guardian has neither retracted nor apologised for the story about the meeting. Stella Moris, Assange's wife, said The Guardian failed in its responsibility to Assange and its "negligence has created such a problem that if Julian dies or is extradited, that will forever blot the reputation of the Guardian".

==== Joseph Mayton ====
In 2016 The Guardian took down from its website 13 articles written by freelance journalist Joseph Mayton that it believed to include fabricated information, and apologised to its readers and to those people "whose words were misrepresented or falsified".

==== Alleged WhatsApp backdoor ====
After publishing a story on 13 January 2017 claiming that WhatsApp had a "backdoor [that] allows snooping on messages", more than 70 professional cryptographers signed on to an open letter calling for The Guardian to retract the article. On 13 June 2017, readers' editor Paul Chadwick released an article detailing the flawed reporting in the original January article, which was amended to remove references to a backdoor.

==== Spanish-language edition ====
In January 2021 the Mexican La Lista Web portal started publishing content from The Guardian, translated into Spanish, on a three-year licence. The press release announcing this pointed out that The Guardian often criticised Mexican president Andrés Manuel López Obrador.

==== 2022 cyber-attack ====
In December 2022 it was reported that The Guardian had suffered a significant cyber-attack on its office systems, thought to be ransomware. Staff were directed to work from home and were able to continue publishing to the website despite the loss of some internal systems. The print edition also continued to be produced. On 4 January 2023, UK staff were informed of a security breach and that the Information Commissioner's Office had been notified, as required by GDPR. It was indicated that staff would continue working from home until at least 23 January. The newspaper confirmed on 11 January that personal details of all UK staff had been accessed by criminals.

==== Cyprus Confidential ====
In November 2023, the Guardian joined with the International Consortium of Investigative Journalists, Paper Trail Media and 69 media partners including Distributed Denial of Secrets and the Organized Crime and Corruption Reporting Project (OCCRP) and more than 270 journalists in 55 countries and territories to produce the 'Cyprus Confidential' report on the financial network which supports the regime of Vladimir Putin, mostly with connections to Cyprus, and showed Cyprus to have strong links with high-up figures in the Kremlin, some of whom have been sanctioned. Government officials including Cyprus president Nikos Christodoulides and European lawmakers began responding to the investigation's findings in less than 24 hours, calling for reforms and launching probes.

==== Quitting X (Twitter) ====
On 13 November 2024, a week after Donald Trump was elected as US president for the second time, The Guardian announced that it would no longer post content on X, due what it perceived as the overwhelming amount of misinformation, far-right conspiracy theories and racism on the social media platform, especially during the latest election. The Guardian said that readers would still be able to share articles on the platform and reporters would be able to continue using it for 'news-gathering purposes'.

==== Sale of the Observer ====
In September 2024, The Guardian revealed it was in talks to sell The Observer to news website Tortoise Media. Journalists at Guardian Media Group passed a vote to condemn the sale and passed a vote of no confidence in the newspaper's owners, accusing it of betrayal amid concerns that the sale of the paper could harm the financial security of staff members. On 6 December 2024, it was announced that, despite 48 hours of strikes by journalists, the Observer deal with Tortoise was agreed in principle and would go ahead. The agreement included the Trust taking a significant stock position in the purchaser. The final sale price has not been disclosed.

On 18 December 2024, Guardian Media and Tortoise Media closed the sale. A new Observer website was launched on 25 April 2025, and the first print edition under Tortoise appeared on 27 April 2025.

==== UK anti-trans movement ====
In May 2026, a report by Amnesty International found that The Guardian was one of the primary newspapers – along with The Daily Telegraph, The Times/The Sunday Times, and The Sun – involved in manufacturing the British anti-transgender movement, via a years-long campaign designed to frame transgender people as "involved in controversy, demanding or aggressive and with a propensity to be offended" while simultaneously minimizing the impact of transgender voices and magnifying the impact of anti-trans figures and groups.

=== Publication of official history ===
Two volumes of the official history of The Guardian have so far been published, researched and written by Ian Mayes. Witness in a Time of Turmoil: Inside the Guardian's Global Revolution, Volume 1, 1986–1995 was published in May 2025, when historian Joe Moran stated in a review: "Covering nine years in more than 300 pages, this book has all the comprehensiveness of an official history. ...But Mayes enlivens his narrative throughout with humorous touches and compelling character sketches." The second volume, Witness in a Time of Trial: Inside the Guardian's Global Revolution Volume Two: 1995–2009, was published in January 2026.

== Ownership and finances ==
The Guardian is part of the Guardian Media Group (GMG) of newspapers, radio stations and print media. GMG components include The Guardian Weekly and TheGuardian.com. All were owned by The Scott Trust, a charitable foundation existing between 1936 and 2008, which aimed to ensure the paper's editorial independence in perpetuity, maintaining its financial health to ensure it did not become vulnerable to takeovers by commercial media groups. At the beginning of October 2008, the Scott Trust's assets were transferred to a new limited company, The Scott Trust Limited, with the intention being that the original trust would be wound up. Dame Liz Forgan, chair of the Scott Trust, reassured staff that the purposes of the new company remained the same as under the previous arrangements.

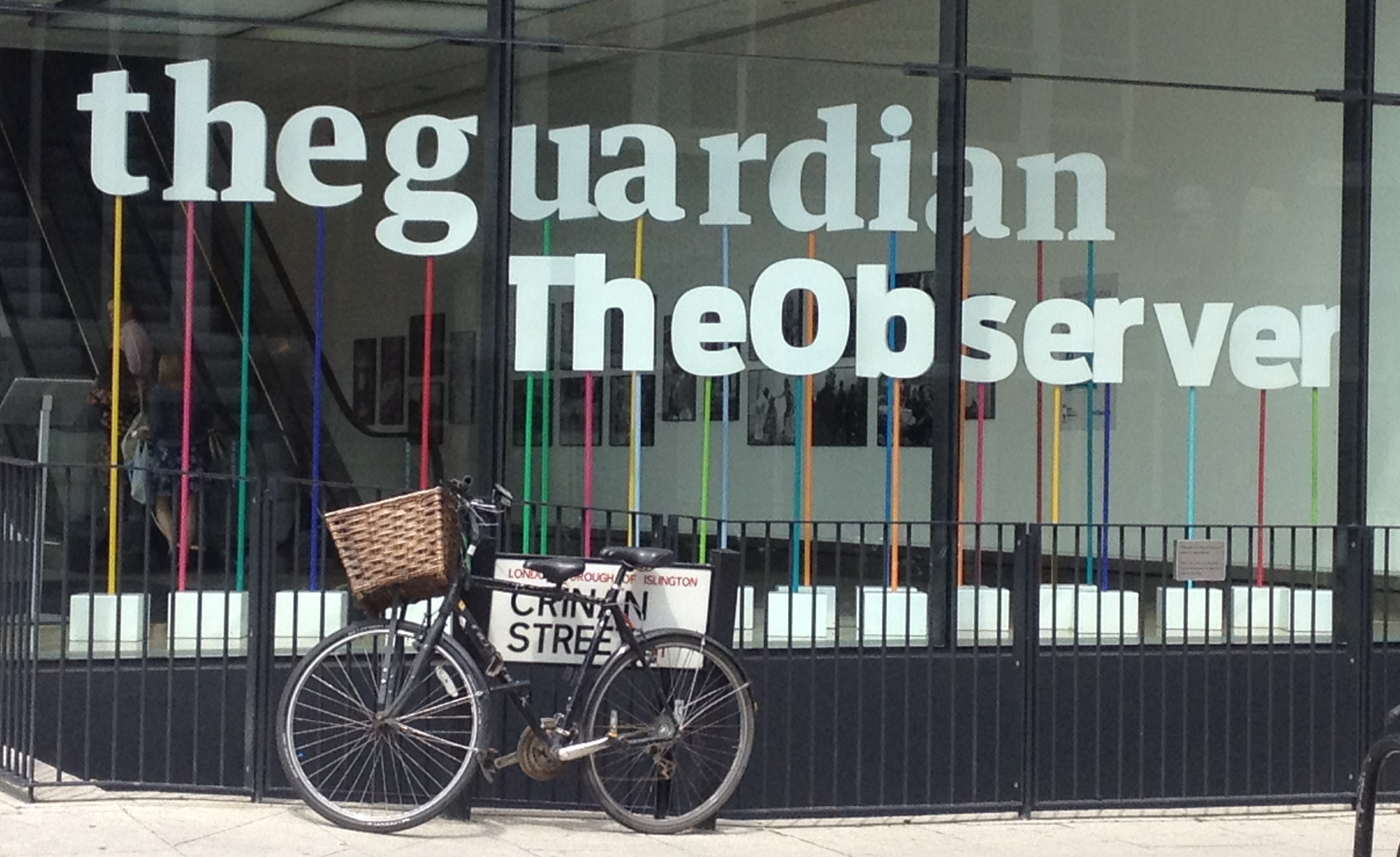
The Guardian's headquarters in London

The Guardian is the only British national daily to conduct (since 2003) an annual social, ethical and environmental audit in which it examines, under the scrutiny of an independent external auditor, its own behaviour as a company. It is also the only British national daily newspaper to employ an internal ombudsman (called the "readers' editor") to handle complaints and corrections.

The Guardian and its parent groups participate in Project Syndicate and intervened in 1995 to save the Mail & Guardian in South Africa; GMG sold the majority of its shares of the Mail & Guardian in 2002.

The Guardian was consistently loss-making until 2019. The National Newspaper division of GMG, reported operating losses of £49.9 million in 2006, up from £18.6 million in 2005. The paper was therefore heavily dependent on cross-subsidisation from profitable companies within the group.

The continual losses made by the National Newspaper division of the Guardian Media Group caused it to dispose of its Regional Media division by selling titles to competitor Trinity Mirror in March 2010. This included the flagship Manchester Evening News, and severed the historic link between that paper and The Guardian. The sale was to safeguard the future of The Guardian newspaper as is the intended purpose of the Scott Trust.

In June 2011 Guardian News and Media revealed increased annual losses of £33 million and announced that it was looking to focus on its online edition for news coverage, leaving the print edition to contain more comments and features. It was also speculated that The Guardian might become the first British national daily paper to be fully online.

For the three years up to June 2012, the paper lost £100,000 a day, which prompted Intelligent Life to question whether The Guardian could survive.

Between 2007 and 2014 The Guardian Media Group sold all their side businesses, of regional papers and online portals for classifieds, and consolidated into The Guardian as sole product. The sales let them acquire a capital stock of £838.3 million as of July 2014, supposed to guarantee the independence of the Guardian in perpetuity. In the first year, the paper made more losses than predicted, and in January 2016 the publishers announced that The Guardian would cut 20 per cent of staff and costs within the next three years. The newspaper is rare in calling for direct contributions "to deliver the independent journalism the world needs."

The Guardian Media Group's 2018 annual report (year ending 1 April 2018) indicated significant changes. Its digital (online) editions accounted for over 50% of group revenues by that time; the loss from news and media operations was £18.6 million, 52% lower than during the prior year (2017: £38.9 million). The Group had cut costs by £19.1 million, partly by switching its print edition to the tabloid format. The Guardian Media Group's owner, the Scott Trust Endowment Fund, reported that its value at the time was £1.01 billion (2017: £1.03 billion). In the following financial report (for the year 2018–2019), the group reported a profit (EBITDA) of £0.8 million before exceptional items, thus breaking even in 2019.

To be sustainable, the annual subsidy must fall within the £25 million of interest returned on the investments from the Scott Trust Endowment Fund.

=== "Membership" subscription scheme ===
In 2014, The Guardian launched a membership scheme. The scheme aims to reduce the financial losses incurred by The Guardian without introducing a paywall, thus maintaining open access to the website. Website readers can pay a monthly subscription, with three tiers available. As of 2018 this approach was considered successful, having brought more than 1 million subscriptions or donations, with the paper hoping to break even by April 2019.

=== Foundation funding ===
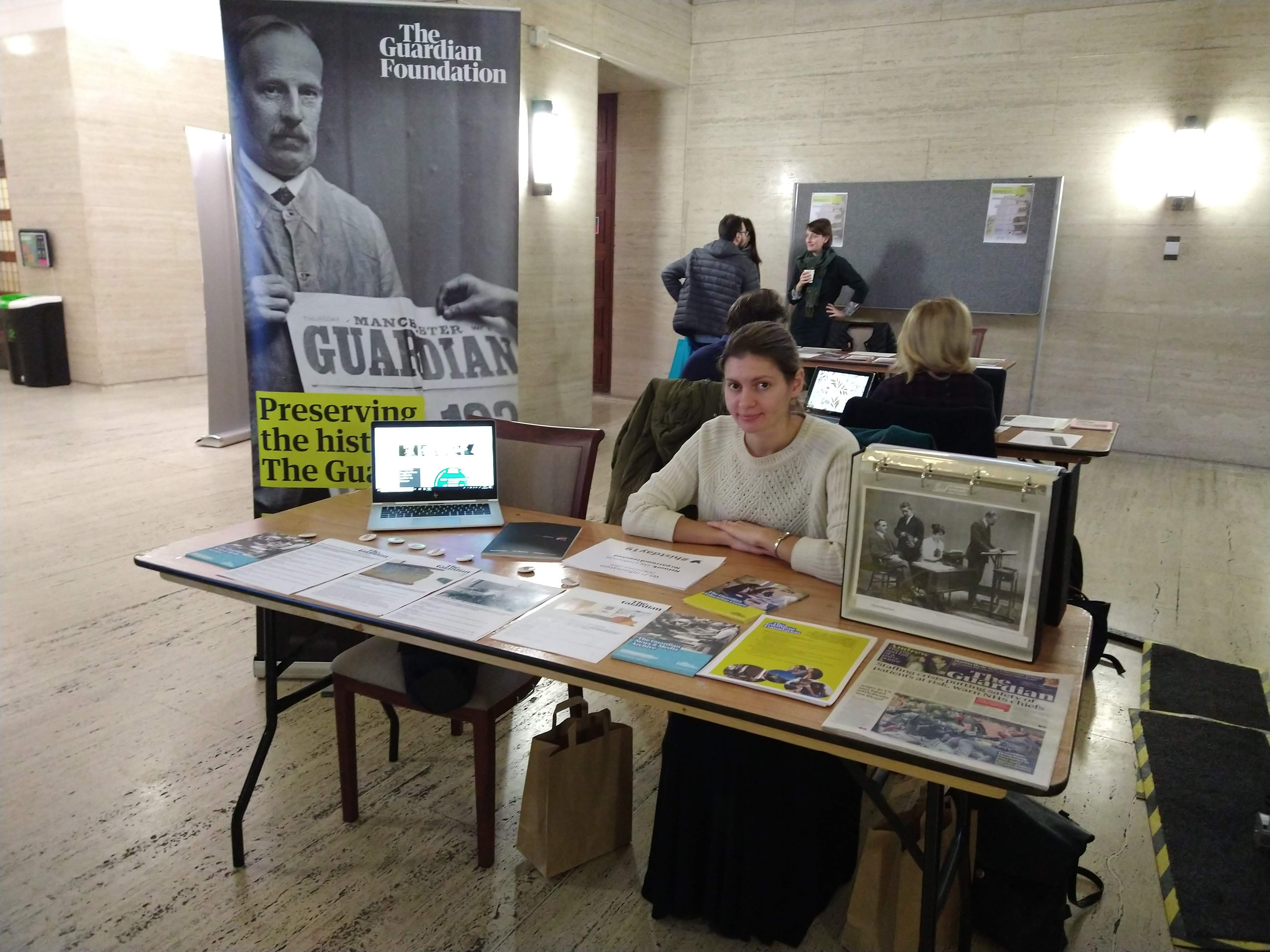
The Guardian Foundation at the Senate House History Day, 2019

In 2016, the company established a US-based philanthropic arm to raise money from individuals and organisations including think tanks and corporate foundations. The grants are focused by the donors on particular issues. By the following year, the organisation had raised $1 million from the likes of Pierre Omidyar's Humanity United, the Skoll Foundation, and the Conrad N. Hilton Foundation to finance reporting on topics including modern-day slavery and climate change. The Guardian has stated that it has secured $6 million "in multi-year funding commitments" thus far.

The new project developed from funding relationships which the paper already had with the Ford, Rockefeller, and Bill and Melinda Gates Foundation. Gates had given the organisation $5 million for its Global Development webpage.

As of March 2020, the journal claims to be "the first major global news organisation to institute an outright ban on taking money from companies that extract fossil fuels."

== Political stance and editorial opinion ==
Founded by textile traders and merchants, in its early years The Guardian had a reputation as "an organ of the middle class", or in the words of C. P. Scott's son Ted, "a paper that will remain bourgeois to the last". Associated at first with the Little Circle and hence with classical liberalism as expressed by the Whigs and later by the Liberal Party, its political orientation underwent a decisive change after World War II, leading to a gradual alignment with Labour and the political left in general.

The Scott Trust describes one of its "core purposes" to be "to secure the financial and editorial independence of the Guardian in perpetuity: as a quality national newspaper without party affiliation; remaining faithful to its liberal tradition". The paper's readership is generally on the mainstream left of British political opinion: a MORI poll taken between April and June 2000 showed that 80 per cent of Guardian readers were Labour Party voters; according to another MORI poll taken in 2005, 48 per cent of Guardian readers were Labour voters and 34 per cent Liberal Democrat voters. The term "Guardian reader" can be used to imply a stereotype of modern liberal, left-wing or "politically correct" views. In 2022, Suella Braverman blamed disruptive protests on the "Guardian-reading, tofu-eating wokerati".

Although the paper is often considered to be "linked inextricably" to the Labour Party, three of The Guardian's four leader writers joined the more centrist Social Democratic Party on its foundation in 1981. The paper was enthusiastic in its support for Tony Blair in his successful bid to lead the Labour Party, and to be elected Prime Minister. On 19 January 2003, two months before the 2003 invasion of Iraq, an Observer Editorial said: "Military intervention in the Middle East holds many dangers. But if we want a lasting peace it may be the only option. ... War with Iraq may yet not come, but, conscious of the potentially terrifying responsibility resting with the British Government, we find ourselves supporting the current commitment to a possible use of force." The Guardian, however, opposed the war, along with the Daily Mirror and The Independent.

Then Guardian features editor Ian Katz asserted in 2004 that "it is no secret we are a centre-left newspaper". In 2008, Guardian columnist Jackie Ashley said that editorial contributors were a mix of "right-of-centre libertarians, greens, Blairites, Brownites, Labourite but less enthusiastic Brownites, etc.", and that the newspaper was "clearly left of centre and vaguely progressive". She also said that "you can be absolutely certain that come the next general election, The Guardian's stance will not be dictated by the editor, still less any foreign proprietor (it helps that there isn't one) but will be the result of vigorous debate within the paper". The paper's comment and opinion pages, though often written by centre-left contributors such as Polly Toynbee, have allowed some space for right-of-centre voices such as Sir Max Hastings and Michael Gove. Since an editorial in 2000, The Guardian has favoured abolition of the British monarchy. "I write for the Guardian," said Max Hastings in 2005, "because it is read by the new establishment," reflecting the paper's then-growing influence.

In the run-up to the 2010 general election, following a meeting of the editorial staff, the paper declared its support for the Liberal Democrats, due in particular, to the party's stance on electoral reform. The paper suggested tactical voting to prevent a Conservative victory, given Britain's first-past-the-post electoral system. At the 2015 United Kingdom general election, the paper switched its support to the Labour Party. The paper argued that Britain needed a new direction and Labour "speaks with more urgency than its rivals on social justice, standing up to predatory capitalism, on investment for growth, on reforming and strengthening the public realm, Britain's place in Europe and international development".

Assistant Editor Michael White, in discussing media self-censorship in March 2011, says: "I have always sensed liberal, middle class ill-ease in going after stories about immigration, legal or otherwise, about welfare fraud or the less attractive tribal habits of the working class, which is more easily ignored altogether. Toffs, including royal ones, Christians, especially popes, governments of Israel, and U.S. Republicans are more straightforward targets."

In a 2013 interview for NPR, The Guardian's Latin America correspondent Rory Carroll stated that many editors at The Guardian believed and continue to believe that they should support Hugo Chávez "because he was a standard-bearer for the left".

In the 2015 Labour Party leadership election, The Guardian supported Blairite candidate Yvette Cooper and was critical of left-winger Jeremy Corbyn, the successful candidate. Although the majority of Guardian columnists were against Corbyn winning, Owen Jones, Seumas Milne, and George Monbiot wrote supportive articles about him. Despite the critical position of the paper in general, The Guardian endorsed the Labour Party while Corbyn was its leader in the 2017 and 2019 general elections – although in both cases they endorsed a vote for opposition parties other than Labour, such as the Liberal Democrats and the Scottish National Party in seats where Labour did not stand a chance.

In the 2016 United Kingdom European Union membership referendum, The Guardian endorsed remaining in the EU, and in the 2019 European election invited its readers to vote for pro-EU candidates, without endorsing specific parties.

== Circulation and format ==
Circulation grew rapidly in the early years. It was 4,700 in 1837 and had grown to 10,300 by 1854.

The Guardian had a certified average daily circulation of 204,222 copies in December 2012 — a drop of 11.25 per cent in January 2012 — as compared to sales of 547,465 for The Daily Telegraph, 396,041 for The Times, and 78,082 for The Independent. In March 2013, its average daily circulation had fallen to 193,586, according to the Audit Bureau of Circulations. Circulation has continued to decline and stood at 161,091 in December 2016, a decline of 2.98 per cent year-on-year. In July 2021, the circulation was 105,134; later that year, the publishers stopped making circulation data public.

=== Publication history ===
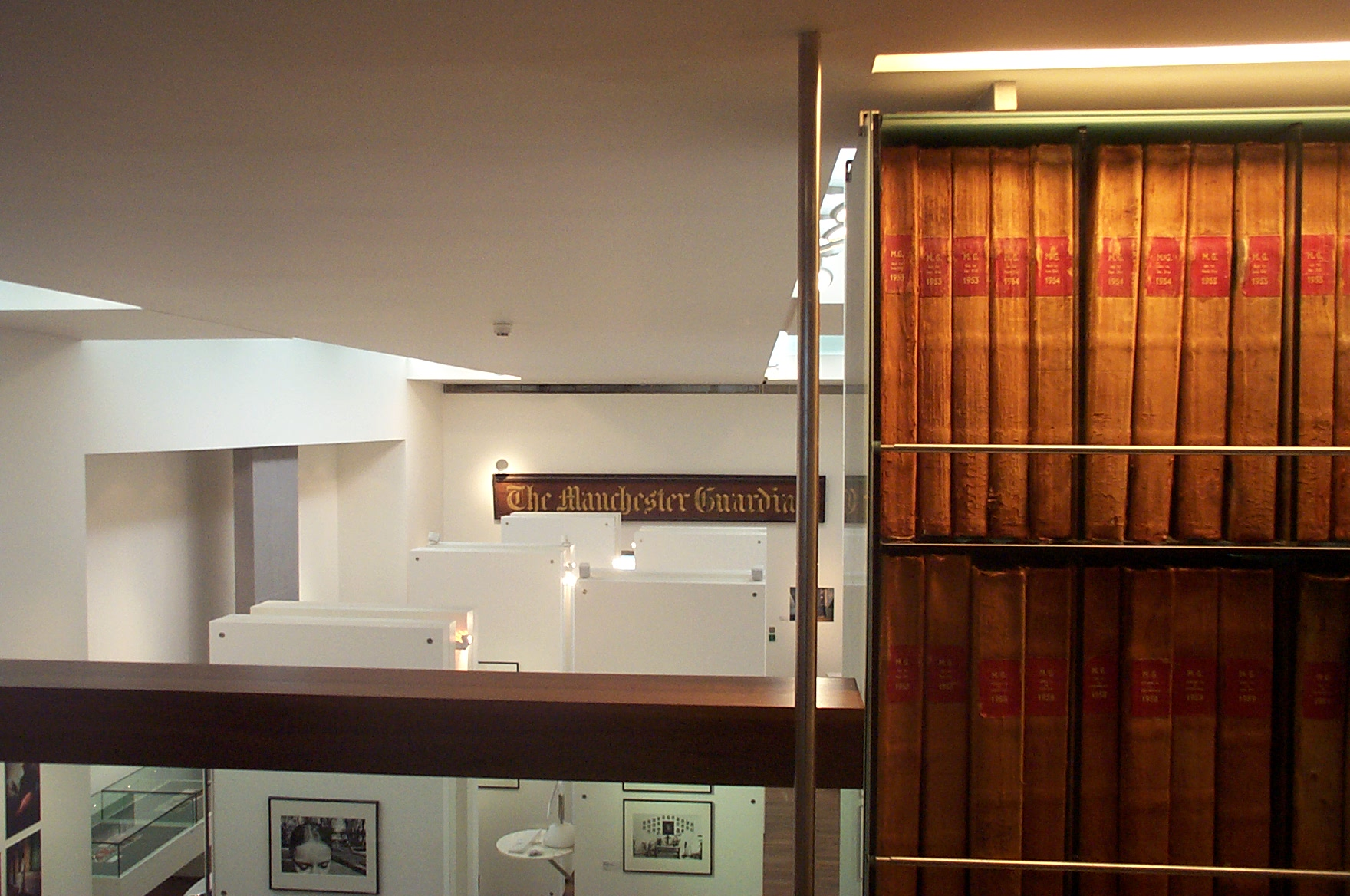
The Guardian's Newsroom visitor centre and archive (No 60), with an old sign with the name The Manchester Guardian

The first edition was published on 5 May 1821, at which time The Guardian was a weekly, published on Saturdays and costing 7d; the stamp duty on newspapers (4d per sheet) forced the price up so high that it was uneconomic to publish more frequently. When the stamp duty was cut in 1836, The Guardian added a Wednesday edition and with the abolition of the tax in 1855 it became a daily paper costing 2d.

In October 1952, the paper took the step of printing news on the front page, replacing the adverts that had hitherto filled that space. Then-editor A. P. Wadsworth wrote: "It is not a thing I like myself, but it seems to be accepted by all the newspaper pundits that it is preferable to be in fashion."

Following the closure of the Anglican Church Newspaper, The Guardian, in 1951, the paper dropped "Manchester" from its title in 1959, becoming simply The Guardian. In 1964 it moved to London, losing some of its regional agenda but continuing to be heavily subsidised by sales of the more downmarket but more profitable Manchester Evening News. The financial position remained extremely poor into the 1970s; at one time it was in merger talks with The Times. The paper consolidated its centre-left stance during the 1970s and 1980s.

On 12 February 1988, The Guardian had a significant redesign; as well as improving the quality of its printers' ink, it also changed its masthead to a juxtaposition of an italic Garamond "The", with a bold Helvetica "Guardian", that remained in use until the 2005 redesign.

In 1992, The Guardian relaunched its features section as G2, a tabloid-format supplement. This innovation was widely copied by the other "quality" broadsheets and ultimately led to the rise of "compact" papers and The Guardian's move to the Berliner format. In 1993 the paper declined to participate in the broadsheet price war started by Rupert Murdoch's The Times. In June 1993, The Guardian bought The Observer from Lonrho, thus gaining a serious Sunday sister newspaper with similar political views.

Its international weekly edition is now titled The Guardian Weekly, though it retained the title Manchester Guardian Weekly for some years after the home edition had moved to London. It includes sections from a number of other internationally significant newspapers of a somewhat left-of-centre inclination, including Le Monde and The Washington Post. The Guardian Weekly was also linked to a website for expatriates, Guardian Abroad, which was launched in 2007 but had been taken offline by 2012.

=== Moving to the Berliner paper format ===
Front page of 6 June 2014 edition in the Berliner format

The Guardian is printed in full colour, and was the first newspaper in the UK to use the Berliner format for its main section, while producing sections and supplements in a range of page sizes including tabloid, approximately A4, and pocket-size (approximately A5).

In 2004, The Guardian announced plans to change to a Berliner or "midi" format, similar to that used by Die Tageszeitung in Germany, Le Monde in France and many other European papers. At 470×315 mm, this is slightly larger than a traditional tabloid. Planned for the autumn of 2005, this change followed moves by The Independent and The Times to start publishing in tabloid (or compact) format. On Thursday, 1 September 2005, The Guardian announced that it would launch the new format on Monday 12 September 2005. Sister Sunday newspaper The Observer also changed to this new format on 8 January 2006.

The format switch was accompanied by a comprehensive redesign of the paper's look. On Friday, 9 September 2005, the newspaper unveiled its newly designed front page, which débuted on Monday 12 September 2005. Designed by Mark Porter, the new look includes a new masthead for the newspaper, its first since 1988. A typeface family designed by Paul Barnes and Christian Schwartz was created for the new design. With just over 200 fonts, it was described as "one of the most ambitious custom type programs ever commissioned by a newspaper". Among the fonts is Guardian Egyptian, a slab serif that is used in various weights for both text and headlines, and is central to the redesign.

The switch cost Guardian Newspapers £80 million and involved setting up new printing presses in east London and Manchester. This switch was necessary because, before The Guardian's move, no printing presses in Britain could produce newspapers in the Berliner format. There were additional complications, as one of the paper's presses was part-owned by Telegraph Newspapers and Express Newspapers, contracted to use the plant until 2009. Another press was shared with the Guardian Media Group's north-western tabloid local papers, which did not wish to switch to the Berliner format.

==== Reception ====
The new format was generally well received by Guardian readers, who were encouraged to provide feedback on the changes. The only controversy was over the dropping of the Doonesbury cartoon strip. The paper reported thousands of calls and emails complaining about its loss; within 24 hours the decision was reversed and the strip was reinstated the following week. G2 supplement editor Ian Katz, who was responsible for dropping it, apologised in the editors' blog saying, "I'm sorry, once again, that I made you—and the hundreds of fellow fans who have called our helpline or mailed our comments' address—so cross." However, some readers were dissatisfied as the earlier deadline needed for the all-colour sports section meant coverage of late-finishing evening football matches became less satisfactory in the editions supplied to some parts of the country.

The investment was rewarded with a circulation rise. In December 2005, the average daily sale stood at 380,693, nearly 6 per cent higher than the figure for December 2004. However, by December 2012, circulation had dropped to 204,222. In 2006, the US-based Society for News Design chose The Guardian and Polish daily Rzeczpospolita as the world's best-designed newspapers—from among 389 entries from 44 countries.

=== Tabloid format since 2018 ===
In June 2017, Guardian Media Group (GMG) announced that The Guardian and The Observer would relaunch in tabloid format from early 2018. The Guardian confirmed the launch date for the new format to be 15 January 2018. GMG also signed a contract with Trinity Mirror – the publisher of the Daily Mirror, Sunday Mirror, and Sunday People – to outsource printing of The Guardian and The Observer.

The format change was intended to help cut costs as it allowed the paper to be printed by a wider array of presses, and outsourcing the printing to presses owned by Trinity Mirror was expected to save millions of pounds annually. The move was part of a three-year plan that included cutting 300 jobs in an attempt to reduce losses and break even by 2019. The paper and ink are the same as previously and the font size is fractionally larger.

An assessment of the response from readers in late April 2018 indicated that the new format had led to an increased number of subscriptions. The editors were working on changing aspects that had caused complaints from readers.

In July 2018, the masthead of the new tabloid format was adjusted to a dark blue.

== Online media ==
The Guardian and its former Sunday sibling The Observer publish all their news online, with free access both to current news and an archive of three million stories. A third of the site's hits are for items over a month old. As of May 2013, it was the most popular UK newspaper website with 8.2 million unique visitors per month, just ahead of Mail Online with 7.6 million unique monthly visitors. In April 2011, MediaWeek reported that The Guardian was the fifth most popular newspaper site in the world. Journalists use an analytics tool called Ophan, built entirely in-house, to measure website data around stories and audience. However, the number of online readers had drastically dropped by July 2021.

The Guardian launched an iOS mobile application for its content in 2009. An Android app followed in 2011. In 2018, the newspaper's apps and mobile website were redesigned to coincide with its relaunch in tabloid format.

The Comment is Free section includes columns by the paper's journalists and regular commentators, articles from guest writers, and readers' comments and responses to articles. The section includes all the opinion pieces published in the paper itself and many others that only appear online. Censorship is exercised by moderators who can ban – with no right of appeal –posts that they feel have overstepped the mark. The Guardian has taken what they call a very "open" stance in delivering news, and have launched an open platform for their content. This allows external developers to easily use Guardian content in external applications, and even to feed third-party content back into the Guardian network. The Guardian also had a number of talkboards that were noted for their mix of political discussion and whimsy until they were closed on 25 February 2011 after settlement of a libel action brought after months of harassment of a Conservative Party activist. They were spoofed in The Guardian's own regular humorous Chatroom column in G2. The spoof column purported to be excerpts from a chatroom on permachat.co.uk, a real URL that pointed to The Guardian's talkboards.

In August 2013, a webshow titled Thinkfluencer was launched by Guardian Multimedia in association with Arte.

In 2004 the paper also launched a dating website, Guardian Soulmates. On 1 July 2020, Guardian Soulmates was closed down with the explanation: "The online dating world is a very different place to when we first launched online in July 2004. There are so many dating apps now, so many ways to meet people, which are often free and very quick."

An American version of the Guardian Unlimited website titled Guardian America was intended to win more US-based readers, but was abandoned in October 2009.

The Guardian launched an .onion version of its website on the Tor network in May 2022, with assistance from Alec Muffett.

In 2025 The Guardian, in collaboration with the University of Cambridge, implemented a Secure Messaging feature in its mobile app to enable journalistic sources to communicate securely with the newspaper. Messaging is made indistinguishable from other data exchanged with millions of app users, so that not only the content of messages but the fact that messaging is taking place is hidden from investigators, to protect whistleblower sources who could be endangered if their communication becomes known to authorities. The source code has been published under the Apache License 2.0, with detailed information on its operation.

=== Podcasts ===
The paper entered podcasting in 2005 with a twelve-part weekly podcast series by Ricky Gervais. In January 2006, Gervais' show topped the iTunes podcast chart, having been downloaded by two million listeners worldwide, and was scheduled to be listed in the 2007 Guinness Book of Records as the most downloaded podcast.

The Guardian offers several regular podcasts made by its journalists. One of the most prominent is Today in Focus, a daily news podcast hosted by Anushka Asthana launched on 1 November 2018. It was an immediate success and became one of the UK's most-downloaded podcasts.

== GuardianFilms ==
In 2003 The Guardian started the film production company GuardianFilms, headed by journalist Maggie O'Kane. Much of the company's output is documentary made for television – and it has included Salam Pax's Baghdad Blogger for BBC Two's daily flagship Newsnight, some of which have been shown in compilations by CNN International, Sex on the Streets and Spiked, both made for the UK's Channel 4 television.

GuardianFilms has received several broadcasting awards. In addition to two Amnesty International Media Awards in 2004 and 2005, The Baghdad Blogger: Salam Pax won a Royal Television Society Award in 2005. Baghdad: A Doctor's Story won an Emmy Award for Best International Current Affairs film in 2007. In 2008 photojournalist Sean Smith's Inside the Surge won the Royal Television Society award for best international news film – the first time a newspaper has won such an award. The same year, The Guardian's Katine website was awarded for its outstanding new media output at the One World Media awards. Again in 2008, GuardianFilms' undercover video report revealing vote rigging by Robert Mugabe's ZANU–PF party during the 2007 Zimbabwe election won best news programme of the year at the Broadcast Awards.

In 2026, Guardian Films produced NAZA, a documentary film directed by Yuval Abraham and Rachel Szor and co-produced with James Wilson of JW Films. Jonathan Glazer served as executive producer. The film received the Special Jury Prize at the 83rd Venice International Film Festival.

== References in popular culture ==
The paper's nickname The Grauniad (sometimes abbreviated as "Graun") originated with the satirical magazine Private Eye. This anagram played on The Guardian's early reputation for frequent typographical errors, including misspelling its own name as The Gaurdian.

The first issue of the newspaper contained a number of errors, including a notification that there would soon be some goods sold at atction instead of auction. Fewer typographical errors are seen in the paper since the end of hot-metal typesetting. One Guardian writer, Keith Devlin, suggested that the high number of observed misprints was due more to the quality of the readership than the misprints' greater frequency. The newspaper was printed in Manchester until 1961 and the fact that the prints sent to London by train were the early, more error-prone, prints may have contributed to this image as well. When John Cole was appointed news editor by Alastair Hetherington in 1963, he sharpened the paper's comparatively "amateurish" setup.

Employees of The Guardian or The Observer have been depicted in the films The Fifth Estate (2013), Snowden (2016) and Official Secrets (2019), while Paddy Considine played a fictional Guardian journalist in the film The Bourne Ultimatum (2007). Keira Knightley played a fictional Guardian journalist in the film The Woman in Cabin 10 (2025).

The term "Guardian reader" is sometimes used to describe a person with progressive, left-wing or "politically correct" views.

== Awards ==
=== Received ===
The Guardian was awarded the National Newspaper of the Year award in 1998, 2005, 2010 and 2013 by the British Press Awards, and Front Page of the Year in 2002 ("A declaration of war", 12 September 2001). It was also co-winner of the World's Best-designed Newspaper as awarded by the Society for News Design (2005, 2007, 2013, 2014).

Guardian journalists have won a range of British Press Awards, including:

- Reporter of the Year (Nick Davies, 2000; Paul Lewis, 2010; Rob Evans & Paul Lewis, 2014);
- Foreign Reporter of the Year (James Meek, 2004; Ghaith Abdul-Ahad, 2008);
- Scoop of the Year (Milly Dowler phone hacked, 2012)
- Young Journalist of the Year (Emma Brockes, 2001; Patrick Kingsley, 2013);
- Columnist of the Year (Polly Toynbee, 2007; Charlie Brooker, 2009);
- Critic of the Year (Marina O'Loughlin, 2015);
- Feature Writer of the Year (Emma Brockes, 2002; Tanya Gold, 2009; Amelia Gentleman, 2010);
- Cartoonist of the Year (Steve Bell, 2003);
- Political Journalist of the Year (Patrick Wintour, 2006; Andrew Sparrow, 2010);
- Science & Health Journalist of the Year (Sarah Boseley, 2016);
- Business & Finance Journalist of the Year (Ian Griffiths, 2005; Simon Goodley, 2014);
- Interviewer of the Year (Decca Aitkenhead, 2008);
- Sports Reporter of the Year (David Lacey, 1997, 2002);
- Sports Photographer of the Year (Tom Jenkins, 2003, 2005, 2006, 2015);
- Website of the Year (guardian.com/uk, 1999, 2001, 2007, 2008, 2015, 2020);
- Digital Journalist of the Year (Dan Milmo, 2001; Sean Smith, 2008; Dave Hill, 2009)
- Supplement of the Year (Guardian's Guides to..., 2007; Weekend Magazine, 2015)
- Special Supplement of the Year (World Cup 2010 Guide, 2010)

Other awards include:

- Bevins Prize for investigative journalism (Paul Lewis, 2010);
- Martha Gellhorn Prize for Journalism (Nick Davies, 1999; Chris McGreal, 2003; Ghaith Abdul-Ahad, 2005; Ian Cobain, 2009).

The excellence of GUARDIAN environmental reporting has been recognised with numerous SEAL Environmental Journalism Awards: (Damian Carrington, 2017, 2018; Johnathan Watts, 2018, 2019; Fiona Harvey, 2019, 2020; George Monbiot, 2017; and Richa Syal, 2022).

The Guardian, Observer and its journalists have also won numerous accolades at the British Sports Journalism Awards:

- Sports Writer of the Year (Daniel Taylor, 2017)
- Sports News Reporter of the Year (David Conn, 2009, 2014)
- Football Journalist of the Year (Daniel Taylor, 2015, 2016, 2017)
- Sports Interviewer of the Year (Donald McRae, 2009, 2011)
- Diarist of the Year (David Hills, 2009)
- Sports Feature Writer of the Year (Donald McRae, 2017, 2018)
- Specialist Correspondent of the Year (Sean Ingle, 2016, 2017)
- Scoop of the Year (Daniel Taylor 2016; Martha Kelner and Sean Ingle, 2017)
- Sports Newspaper of the Year (2017)
- Sports Website of the Year (2014, 2015, 2016, 2017)
- Sports Journalists' Association Sports Portfolio of the Year (Tom Jenkins, 2011)

The guardian.co.uk website won the Best Newspaper category three years running in 2005, 2006 and 2007 Webby Awards, beating (in 2005) The New York Times, The Washington Post, The Wall Street Journal and Variety. It has been the winner for six years in a row of the British Press Awards for Best Electronic Daily Newspaper. The site won an Eppy award from the US-based magazine Editor & Publisher in 2000 for the best-designed newspaper online service.

In 2007, the newspaper was ranked first in a study on transparency that analysed 25 mainstream English-language media vehicles, which was conducted by the International Center for Media and the Public Agenda of the University of Maryland. It scored 3.8 out of a possible 4.0.

The Guardian US and The Washington Post shared the 2014 Pulitzer Prize for public service reporting for their coverage of the worldwide electronic surveillance program of the NSA and GCHQ, and the document leaks by whistleblower Edward Snowden.

=== Given ===
The Guardian is the sponsor of two major literary awards: The Guardian First Book Award, established in 1999 as a successor to the Guardian Fiction Award, which had run since 1965, and the Guardian Children's Fiction Prize, founded in 1967. In recent years the newspaper has also sponsored the Hay Festival in Hay-on-Wye.

The annual Guardian Student Media Awards, founded in 1999, recognise excellence in journalism and design of British university and college student newspapers, magazines and websites.

In memory of Paul Foot, who died in 2004, The Guardian and Private Eye jointly set up the Paul Foot Award, with an annual £10,000 prize fund, for investigative or campaigning journalism.

The newspaper produces The Guardian 100 Best Footballers in the World. Since 2018 it has also co-produced the female equivalent, The 100 Best Female Footballers in the World.

In 2016, The Guardian began awarding an annual Footballer of the Year award, given to a footballer regardless of gender "who has done something truly remarkable, whether by overcoming adversity, helping others or setting a sporting example by acting with exceptional honesty."

=== Best books lists ===
- The Guardian's 100 best novels is a list of the best English-language novels as selected by Robert McCrum.
- The Guardian's 100 greatest non-fiction book list has come out in 2011 and in 2017, as selected by Robert McCrum.

== Editors ==
#	Name	Term	Notes
1	John Edward Taylor	1821–1844	
2	Jeremiah Garnett	1844–1861	Served jointly with Russell Scott Taylor from 1847 to 1848
2	Russell Scott Taylor	1847–1848	Served jointly with Jeremiah Garnett
4	Edward Taylor	1861–1872	
5	Charles Prestwich Scott	1872–1929	
6	Ted Scott	1929–1932	
7	William Percival Crozier	1932–1944	
8	Alfred Powell Wadsworth	1944–1956	
9	Alastair Hetherington	1956–1975	
10	Peter Preston	1975–1995	
11	Alan Rusbridger	1995–2015	
12	Katharine Viner	2015–present	

== Notable regular contributors (past and present) ==
Columnists and journalists:

- David Aaronovitch
- James Agate
- Ian Aitken
- Decca Aitkenhead
- Brian Aldiss
- Tariq Ali
- Araucaria
- John Arlott
- Claire Armitstead
- Mark Arnold-Forster
- Jackie Ashley
- Dilpazier Aslam
- Harriet Baber
- Nancy Banks-Smith
- Leonard Barden
- Laura Barton
- Catherine Bennett
- Marcel Berlins
- Michael Billington
- Ian Black
- Heston Blumenthal
- Sidney Blumenthal
- Boutros Boutros-Ghali
- Frankie Boyle
- Mark Boyle
- Lloyd Bradley
- Russell Brand
- Emma Brockes
- Charlie Brooker
- Thom Brooks
- Guy Browning
- Alex Brummer
- Inayat Bunglawala
- Madeleine Bunting
- Julie Burchill
- Simon Callow
- James Cameron
- Duncan Campbell
- Neville Cardus
- Alexander Chancellor
- George Chidi
- Kira Cochrane
- Mark Cocker
- Alistair Cooke
- G. D. H. Cole
- John Cole
- Rosalind Coward
- Gavyn Davies
- Robin Denselow
- Beth Ditto
- Tim Dowling
- Terry Eagleton
- Larry Elliott
- Matthew Engel
- Edzard Ernst
- Harold Evans
- Evelyn Flinders
- Paul Foot
- Liz Forgan
- Brian J. Ford
- John Fordham
- Dawn Foster
- Nigel Fountain
- Ebenezer Fox
- Michael Frayn
- Jonathan Freedland
- Hadley Freeman
- Timothy Garton Ash
- Tanya Gold
- Ben Goldacre
- Victor Gollancz
- Richard Gott
- A. C. Grayling
- Roy Greenslade
- Germaine Greer
- A. Harry Griffin
- Ben Hammersley
- Clifford Harper
- Mehdi Hasan
- Max Hastings
- Roy Hattersley
- David Hencke
- Georgina Henry
- Isabel Hilton
- L. T. Hobhouse
- J. A. Hobson
- Tom Hodgkinson
- Will Hodgkinson
- Simon Hoggart
- Stewart Holden
- Clare Hollingworth
- Will Hutton
- Marina Hyde
- C. L. R. James
- Erwin James (pseudonym)
- Waldemar Januszczak
- Simon Jenkins
- Stanley Johnson
- Owen Jones
- Alex Kapranos
- Saeed Kamali Dehghan
- Victor Keegan
- Martin Kelner
- Emma Kennedy
- Maev Kennedy
- Martin Kettle
- Arthur Koestler
- Aleks Krotoski
- David Lacey
- Mark Lawson
- David Leigh
- Rod Liddle
- Sue Limb (as Dulcie Domum)
- Maureen Lipman
- Joris Luyendijk
- John Maddox
- Derek Malcolm
- Dan McDougall
- Johnjoe McFadden
- Melanie McFadyean
- Neil McIntosh
- David McKie
- Gareth McLean
- Ian Mayes
- Anna Minton
- David Mitchell
- George Monbiot
- C. E. Montague
- Suzanne Moore
- Malcolm Muggeridge
- James Naughtie
- Richard Norton-Taylor
- John O'Connor Power
- Maggie O'Kane
- Susie Orbach
- Greg Palast
- David Pallister
- Michael Parkinson
- 'Salam Pax'
- Jim Perrin
- Melanie Phillips
- Helen Pidd
- John Pilger
- Anna Politkovskaya
- Peter Preston
- Tim Radford
- Arthur Ransome
- Adam Raphael
- Andrew Rawnsley
- Brian Redhead
- James H Reeve
- Gillian Reynolds
- Simon Rogers
- Jon Ronson
- Rhik Samadder
- Ash Sarkar
- Jack Schofield
- Mike Selvey
- Norman Shrapnel
- Frank Sidebottom
- Posy Simmonds
- Howard Spring
- Jean Stead
- David Steel
- Jonathan Steele
- Mary Stott
- Allegra Stratton
- John Sutherland
- R. H. Tawney
- A. J. P. Taylor
- Arnold Toynbee
- Polly Toynbee
- Jill Tweedie
- Bibi van der Zee
- F. A. Voigt
- Ed Vulliamy
- Hilary Wainwright
- Martin Walker
- Hank Wangford
- Jim Waterson
- Jonathan Watts
- Francis Wheen
- Brian Whitaker
- Estelle White
- Michael White
- Ann Widdecombe
- Martyn Huw Williams
- Zoe Williams
- Ted Wragg
- Hugo Young
- Gary Younge
- Xue Xinran
- Tony Zappone
- Jack Massarik
- Slavoj Žižek
- Victor Zorza

Cartoonists:

- David Austin
- Steve Bell
- Joe Berger
- Berke Breathed
- Biff
- Peter Clarke
- Les Gibbard
- John Kent
- Jamie Lenman
- David Low
- Martin Rowson
- Posy Simmonds
- Garry Trudeau

Satirists:

- John Crace
- Jeremy Hardy
- Armando Iannucci
- Terry Jones
- Craig Brown as "Bel Littlejohn"
- John O'Farrell
- Mark Steel

Experts:

- Tim Atkin
- Matthew Fort
- Malcolm Gluck
- Tim Hayward
- Fiona Beckett

Photographers and picture editors:

- Herbert Walter Doughty (The Manchester Guardian's first photographer, July 1908)
- Eamonn McCabe
- Sean Smith

== Guardian News and Media archive ==
The Guardian and its then-sister newspaper The Observer opened The Newsroom, an archive and visitor centre in London, in 2002. The centre preserved and promoted the histories and values of the newspapers through its archive, educational programmes and exhibitions. The Newsroom's activities were all transferred to Kings Place in 2008. Now known as The Guardian News & Media archive, the archive preserves and promotes the histories and values of The Guardian and The Observer newspapers by collecting and making accessible material that provides an accurate and comprehensive history of the papers. The archive holds official records of The Guardian and The Observer, and also seeks to acquire material from individuals who have been associated with the papers. As well as corporate records, the archive holds correspondence, diaries, notebooks, original cartoons and photographs belonging to staff of the papers. This material may be consulted by members of the public by prior appointment. An extensive Manchester Guardian archive also exists at the University of Manchester's John Rylands University Library, and there is a collaboration programme between the two archives. Additionally, the British Library has a large archive of The Manchester Guardian available in its British Library Newspapers collection, in online, hard copy, microform, and CD-ROM formats.

In November 2007, The Guardian and The Observer made their archives available over the internet via DigitalArchive. The current extent of the archives available are 1821 to 2003 for The Guardian and 1791 to 2003 for The Observer:

The Newsroom's other components were also transferred to Kings Place in 2008. The Guardian's Education Centre provides a range of educational programmes for students and adults. The Guardian's exhibition space was also moved to Kings Place, and has a rolling programme of exhibitions that investigate and reflect upon aspects of news and newspapers and the role of journalism. This programme often draws on the archive collections held in the GNM archive.

== See also ==
- Guardian Monthly
- The Guardian Weekly
