= List of heads of houses of the University of Oxford =

This is a list of current heads of houses of colleges, permanent private halls, and other related organisations of the University of Oxford.

== Colleges ==
| College | Title | Head of house | Since |
|---|---|---|---|
| All Souls | Warden | Sir John Vickers | 2008 |
| Balliol | Master | Seamus Perry | 2026 |
| Brasenose | Principal | Alyson King | 2026 |
| Christ Church | Dean | Sarah Foot | 2023 |
| Corpus Christi | President | Helen Moore | 2018 |
| Exeter | Rector | Major General John Roe | 2024 |
| Green Templeton | Principal | Sir Michael Dixon | 2020 |
| Harris Manchester | Principal | Beth Breeze | 2025 |
| Hertford | Principal | Alexandra Freeman, Baroness Freeman of Steventon | 2026 |
| Jesus | Principal | Lindsay Skoll | 2026 |
| Keble | Warden | Dame Sarah Whatmore | 2026 |
| Kellogg | President | Jonathan Michie | 2007 |
| Lady Margaret Hall | Principal | Christine Gerrard | 2025 |
| Linacre | Principal | Nick Brown | 2010 |
| Lincoln | Rector | Nigel Clifford | 2024 |
| Magdalen | President | Dinah Rose | 2020 |
| Mansfield | Principal | Helen Mountfield | 2018 |
| Merton | Warden | Jennifer Payne | 2023 |
| New College | Warden | Sir Robin Niblett | 2026 |
| Nuffield | Warden | Dame Julia Black | 2024 |
| Oriel | Provost | Neil Mendoza, Baron Mendoza | 2018 |
| Pembroke | Master | Sir Ernest Ryder | 2020 |
| Queen's | Provost | Paul Johnson | 2025 |
| Reuben | President | Lionel Tarassenko, Baron Tarassenko | 2019 |
| St Anne's | Principal | Helen King | 2017 |
| St Antony's | Warden | Roger Goodman | 2017 |
| St Catherine's | Master | Jude Kelly | 2025 |
| St Cross | Master | Kate Mavor | 2023 |
| St Edmund Hall | Principal | Katherine Willis, Baroness Willis of Summertown | 2018 |
| St Hilda's | Principal | Dame Sarah Springman | 2021 |
| St Hugh's | Principal | Michele Acton | 2025 |
| St John's | President | Sue Black, Baroness Black of Strome | 2022 |
| St Peter's | Master | Judith Buchanan | 2019 |
| Somerville | Principal | Catherine Royle | 2025 |
| Trinity | President | Sir Robert Chote | 2025 |
| University | Master | Valerie Amos, Baroness Amos | 2020 |
| Wadham | Warden | Robert Hannigan | 2021 |
| Wolfson | President | Sir Tim Hitchens | 2018 |
| Worcester | Provost | David Isaac, Baron Isaac | 2021 |

== Permanent private halls ==
| Hall | Title | Head of house | Since |
|---|---|---|---|
| Blackfriars | Regent | The Revd John O’Connor | 2020 |
| Campion Hall | Master | The Revd Nicholas Austin | 2018 |
| Regent's Park College | Principal | Sir Malcolm Evans | 2023 |
| Wycliffe Hall | Principal | The Revd Michael Lloyd | 2013 |

== Other ==
| Body | Title | Head | Since |
|---|---|---|---|
| The Oxford Centre for Buddhist Studies | Academic director | Richard Gombrich | 2004 |
| The Oxford Institute for Energy Studies | Director | Bassam Fattouh | 2014 |
| Maison française d'Oxford | Director | Pascal Marty | 2020 |
| The Oxford Centre for Hebrew and Jewish Studies | President | Judith Olszowy-Schlanger | 2018 |
| The Oxford Centre for Hindu Studies | Director | Shaunaka Rishi Das | 1997 |
| The Oxford Centre for Islamic Studies | Director | Farhan Nizami | 1985 |
| Ripon College Cuddesdon | Principal | The Revd Humphrey Southern | 2015 |
| St Stephen's House | Principal | The Revd Canon Robin Ward | 2006 |
| Rhodes House | Warden | Elizabeth Kiss | 2018 |
