= List of wardens of All Souls College, Oxford =

The head of All Souls College, University of Oxford, is the Warden. The current Warden is Sir John Vickers who was elected in October 2008.

== List of Wardens of All Souls College ==
Name	From	To	Notes
Richard Andrew	1437	1442	
Roger Keys	1442	1445	
William Kele	1445	1459	
William Potman	1459	1466	
John Stokes	1466	1494	
Thomas Hobbs	1499	1504	
William Broke	1504	1524	
John Cole	1524	1527	
Robert Woodward	1527	1534	
Roger Stokeley	1534	1536	
John Warner	1536	1555	
Seth Holland	1555	c. 1558	Removed from the wardenship and died in prison
John Pope	1558	1558	Died in office
John Warner (again)	1558	1565	
Richard Barber	1565	1570	Also Archdeacon of Leicester
Robert Hovenden	1571	1614	Died in office
Richard Mocket	1614	1618	Died in office
Richard Astley	1618	1636	Died in office 23 February 1635/36
Gilbert Sheldon	1636	1648	Archbishop of Canterbury (1663-1677)
John Palmer	1648	1660	
Gilbert Sheldon (again)	1660	1661	Also Bishop of London (1660-1663)
John Meredith	1661	1665	
Thomas Jeames	1665	1687	
Leopold William Finch	1687	1702	"Pseudo-Custos" until position legalised in 1698. Characterised as "an extravagant man, deeply in debt".
Bernard Gardiner	1702	1726	
Stephen Niblett	1726	1766	
John Tracy, 7th Viscount Tracy	1766	1793	
Edmund Isham	1793	1817	Died in office
Edward Legge	1817	1827	Also Bishop of Oxford (1816–1827)
Lewis Sneyd	1827	1858	
Francis Leighton	1858	1881	
Sir William Anson, 3rd Baronet	1881	1914	
Francis William Pember	1914	1932	
Frederic Thesiger, 1st Viscount Chelmsford	1932	1933	Died in office
William George Stewart Adams	1933	1945	
Benedict Humphrey Sumner	1947	1951	
Sir Hubert Douglas Henderson	1951	1952	
John Hanbury Angus Sparrow	1952	1977	
Patrick Neill	1977	1995	
John Davis	1995	2008	
Sir John Vickers	2008		Incumbent
