= List of principals of Lady Margaret Hall, Oxford =

The head of Lady Margaret Hall, University of Oxford, is the principal. The current principal is Professor Christine Gerrard, since October 2025.

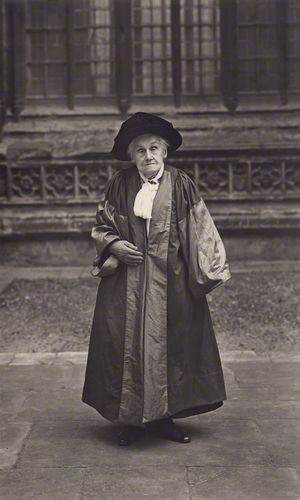
Founding principal Elizabeth Wordsworth in 1928

Name	Birth	Death	Principal between	Notes
Dame Elizabeth Wordsworth	1840	1932	1879 – 1909	Novelist and founding principal, also the founder of St Hugh's College
Henrietta Jex-Blake	1869	1953	1909 – 1921	Violinist and school headmistress prior to joining LMH
Lynda Grier	1880	1967	1921 – 1945	Economist
Dame Lucy Sutherland	1903	1980	1945 – 1971	Historian
Sally Chilver	1914	2014	1971 – 1979	Historian, political scientist and anthropologist
Duncan Stewart	1930	1996	1979 – 1995	Fellow of Wadham College and university administrator
Sir Brian Fall	1937		1995–2002	Diplomat
Dame Frances Lannon	1945		2002–2015	Historian
Alan Rusbridger	1953		2015–2021	Journalist and newspaper editor
Christine Gerrard	1959		2021–2022	Interim Principal; Professor of English Literature
Stephen Blyth	1967		2022–2025	Professor of the Practice of Statistics at Harvard University
Christine Gerrard	1959		2025-	Professor of English Literature
