= Mendillo =

Mendillo is a surname. Notable people with the surname include:

- Ernie Mendillo (born 1959), American musician
- Jane Mendillo, American chief executive
- Michael Mendillo, American astronomer and physicist
- Stephen Mendillo (1940–2025), American actor

== See also ==
- 77136 Mendillo, a main-belt asteroid named after Michael Mendillo
