= Horizons for Homeless Children =

Non-profit organization in Massachusetts, US

- Formation: 1988; 38 years ago
- Founders: Linda A. Mason, Roger H. Brown, and Michael R. Eisenson
- Type: 501(c)(3) organization
- Tax ID no.: 22-2915188
- Headquarters: 1785 Columbus Ave; Roxbury, Massachusetts
- Location: Boston, Massachusetts, U.S.
- Website: horizonschildren.org

Horizons for Homeless Children is a 501(c)(3) nonprofit organization in Massachusetts which provides early education and services for children and families experiencing homelessness.

Horizons for Homeless Children provides spaces for children experiencing homelessness to play and learn. The organization operates an early childhood education center in Roxbury, in addition to "playspaces" installed in shelters for families experiencing homelessness across Massachusetts. The organization also assists parents with job searching and goal setting.

== History ==
Congresswoman Ayanna Pressley, Boston Mayor Michelle Wu, and others in a 2024 group photo celebrating $1 million in federal funding for the organization's programs

Linda A. Mason and Roger H. Brown, co-founders of child-care provider Bright Horizons, along with Michael R. Eisenson, founded the organization in 1988 to serve the needs of homeless children in the Greater Boston area.

Kate Barrand currently serves as the president and CEO of the organization. She plans to step down from her role and retire in the fall of 2026.

== Programs ==
=== Early education center ===
The early education center serves 225 children who are currently experiencing homelessness or have recently experienced homelessness. Serving children between the ages of two months to five years old, each classroom is led by a bilingual teacher and support staff. Each classroom includes three teachers/staff to maintain a low child-to-staff ratio. The education center operates year-round, and all of the organization’s programs are free for families.

The center's curriculum integrates STEM programming, including engineering and coding, to provide students with early exposure to science and technology.

=== Playspace program ===
The Playspace Program installs rooms in family homeless shelters across Massachusetts which provide safe environments for children experiencing homelessness to play. Playspaces are staffed by volunteers. Many Playspaces are located in hotels and motels which have been converted into emergency shelters for families experiencing homelessness.

=== Family Partnerships program ===
The Family Partnerships Program provides "Family Advocates" who assist parents with transitioning out of homelessness and leaving the shelter system. The program also provides classes in financial literacy and parenting.

== Partners and funders ==
Horizons for Homeless Children is funded by the federal and Massachusetts state government, as well as private and corporate donors. In the past, the organization has received funding from the federal government for emergency childcare support for families experiencing homelessness in Boston.

Horizons for Homeless Children partners with many organizations. These partners include the DevTech Research Group at Boston College which provides curriculum and support for early coding and robotics for children. The organization's engineering programming is also supported by the Museum of Science.

The organization also works with Boston Public Schools through their Universal Pre-K program to assist with Kindergarten placements.

In 2023, the organization partnered with Cradles to Crayons and Neighborhood Villages to provide children in shelters with winter coats, hats, gloves, diapers, books, school supplies, and play kits.

== Events ==
=== Annual breakfast ===
Horizons for Homeless Children hosts an annual breakfast event to raise funds and awareness for the organization. Notable guest speakers include Maya Angelou, Tara Westover, Angie Thomas, Leigh Anne Tuohy, and Nia Vardalos. Typical attendance for the event is over 1000 guests.

=== Annual gala ===
The organization also hosts an annual gala event. Notable guests include Joe Kennedy III, Charlie Baker, Walter McCarty, Emily Rooney, Jonathan Lavine

Previous sponsors of the event include MFS Investment Management and the Boston Celtics Shamrock Foundation.
