= Harvard University endowment =

American investment management company

Harvard Management Company, Inc.
- Type: Private
- Industry: Investment management
- Founded: 1974
- Headquarters: Boston, Massachusetts, U.S., U.S.
- Key people: N.P. "Narv" Narvekar (CEO); Sanjeev Daga (COO)
- AUM: ▲US$68.0 billion (FY 2026)
- Owner: Harvard University
- Website: www.harvard.edu www.hmc.harvard.edu

The Harvard University endowment, valued at $68.0 billion as of June 30, 2026, is the largest academic endowment in the world. Its value increased in fiscal year 2024, ending the year with its largest sum in history. Along with Harvard's pension assets, working capital, and non-cash gifts, the endowment is managed by Harvard Management Company, Inc. (HMC), a Harvard-owned investment management company.

== Harvard Management Company ==
HMC employs financial professionals to manage the approximately 14,000 funds that constitute the endowment. HMC is a 501(c)(3) non-profit entity exempt from federal income taxation and led by a management team of N.P. "Narv" Narvekar (chief executive officer), Rick Slocum (chief investment officer), and Sanjeev Daga (chief operating officer).

=== Management history ===
Jack Meyer managed HMC from 1990 to September 30, 2005, beginning with an endowment worth $4.8 billion and ending with a value of $25.9 billion (including new contributions). During the last decade of his tenure, the endowment earned an annualized return of 15.9%. In part after compensation disagreements, a number of HMC managers including Meyer himself left to form their own investment management firms. Bloomberg in 2011 reviewed a group of the resultant firms—Adage Capital Management LP, Charlesbank Capital Partners LLC, Convexity Capital Management LP (Meyer's), Highfields Capital Management LP and Regiment Capital Advisors LLC—which at that time between them managed $43 billion in assets.

The university hired Mohamed El-Erian to succeed Meyer as HMC's next president and CEO. He came from the bond trading company PIMCO and pledged to "rebuild and reinvent" the company. He announced his leaving September 12, 2007, to return to PIMCO after guiding the endowment to a one-year return of 23%.

Jane Mendillo was named the new head of HMC, effective July 1, 2008. She had been Wellesley College’s chief investment officer since 2002. Prior to that, she served as vice president for external management at HMC. A 1984 graduate of Yale University followed by an MBA from Yale School of Management, Mendillo first joined HMC as an equities analyst in 1987. Her tenure was largely shaped by the Great Recession, with a cash squeeze in University operation and endowment performance, a shrinkage of endowment asset value, and errant interest rate, financial derivatives and leveraged positions, according to a Feb. 2009 news report. Staff of HMC was trimmed 25%, or by about 50 people, in line with shrinkage of about $8 billion (about 22%). A source for the report said that some of the positions in the endowment which had to be liquidated were in hedge funds run by Meyer's Convexity Capital and Seth Klarman's Baupost Group.

Stephen Blyth became the CEO of HMC on January 1, 2015. Blyth joined the firm in 2006, and previously held roles as Head of Internal Management and Head of Public Markets, responsible for investments in public equity, credit and fixed income markets. An alumnus of Cambridge University and Harvard University, Blyth has also served as a Professor of the Practice of Statistics at Harvard University.

Marc Seidner joined HMC as vice president for domestic fixed income in an effort to revamp the company's bond division in 2006. Mr. Seidner was previously the director of active core strategies at Standish Mellon Asset Management. The Wall Street Journal reported on June 23, 2009, that Seidner was departing from the organization. On August 14, 2009 PIMCO announced that it had hired Seidner as an executive vice president and portfolio manager to manage a range of fixed-income portfolios.

On September 30, 2016, N.P. "Narv" Narvekar was appointed as CEO. In January 2017, Narvekar announced the company would be laying off about half of the 230-employee staff by outsourcing some positions and closing all its internally managed hedge funds by the end of the 2017 fiscal year. In 2019, Narvekar was paid $9.3 million compensation.

=== Controversies ===
In 2002, Harvard Management Company was linked to George W. Bush's Harken Energy scandal. Specifically, Michael R. Eisenson, who would later found private equity firm Charlesbank Capital Partners was the Harvard representative on the Harken Energy board when Harvard made a $30 million investment into the ill-fated oil company venture. At the time, employees were accused of improperly investing their own money into Harken but Harvard deemed those investments appropriate.

From 2004 to 2015 Harvard University acquired 33,600 hectares (83,000 acres) of Romanian forest land. In 2015 they abruptly sold their entire holding to a subsidiary of Ikea. These holdings have since faced significant legal challenge as many were acquired corruptly during Romania's post-Communist restitution process.

=== Ending investments in fossil fuels ===
In September 2021, after years of pressure from student and outside groups, Harvard announced that it will stop investments in fossil fuels. The university's public announcement cited "the need to decarbonize the economy and our responsibility as fiduciaries" in explaining its decision. Climate activists on campus had waged a multi-year campaign for full divestment, including bringing lawsuits, storming the field of the 2019 Harvard-Yale football game, organizing on-campus protests, and other strategies.

== See also ==
- List of colleges and universities in the United States by endowment
- List of wealthiest charitable foundations
