= Hunter Monroe =

American economist

- Born: March 29, 1962 (age 64); Chapel Hill, North Carolina
- Education: Davidson College (BS); University of Oxford (M.Phil., D.Phil.)
- Occupation: Economist
- Years active: 1987–present
- Organization: International Monetary Fund
- Awards: Rhodes Scholar

Hunter Monroe (born March 29, 1962) is an American economist, serving with the United States Congress Joint Economic Committee, Peterson Institute for International Economics, and International Monetary Fund. He was the IMF's representative to Georgia (1996–99) and Honduras (2005–06). He has published in the areas of crypto-assets, central bank digital currencies, natural gas markets, Ponzi schemes, and Caribbean economies, and outside of economics on computational complexity and theoretical physics. He was a Rhodes scholar and term member of the Council on Foreign Relations.

== Background and personal life ==
Born in Chapel Hill, NC, Monroe graduated from Chapel Hill High School (Chapel Hill, North Carolina) in 1980, and went on to study mathematics at Davidson College as a Stuart Scholar. He then obtained his D.Phil. in Economics from Oxford University, studying under Prof. John Vickers, examining systems versus components competition in the computer industry.

== Career ==
Monroe worked on the staff of the United States Congress Joint Economic Committee during 1987–90, focusing on European integration. He subsequently worked at the Peterson Institute for International Economics, co-authoring a book on the U.S. current account deficit.

At the IMF, Monroe led Article IV and technical assistance missions to a range of countries, including Dominica, El Salvador, Georgia, Honduras, the Kyrgyz Republic, Myanmar, Paraguay, Sri Lanka, and Turkmenistan. His work examined subjects including fintech, spillovers within currency unions, Ponzi schemes, offshore financial centers, remittances, natural gas markets, and migration. He worked on teams delivering $3.5 billion debt relief to Bolivia, Honduras, and Zambia. He led development of the IMF's Financial Sector Stability Review, which has become the key tool guiding technical assistance to countries aiming to improve their financial stability, and helped raised $25 million from donor countries for the supporting Financial Sector Stability Fund. He served as IMF Representative to Georgia and Honduras.

Monroe also served as an adjunct professor at George Washington University's Elliott School for International Affairs, leading graduate seminars on the Economics of Natural Gas; at Stanford University's Washington program, on international economics for undergraduates; at the University of Maryland, on macroeconomics; at George Mason University, on exchange rates; and at Marymount University, on Artificial Intelligence Applications for Business and on Economics for Managers.

He has also published in fields outside of economics. In the area of computational complexity, he examined the relationship between computational problems with no fastest algorithm, such as matrix multiplication,. In theoretical physics, he has examined whether closed timelike curves are undesirable in a physical model. This paper "Are Causality Violations Undesirable?" was co-winner of the Queen Mary University of London Essay Prize on Closed Timelike Curves.
