= Hugh Lindley-Jones =

English cricketer

Personal information
- Full name: Hugh Mawdesley Lindley-Jones
- Born: 22 June 1920; Bromley, Kent, England
- Died: 10 August 2015 (aged 95); Chislehurst, Kent, England
- Batting: Right-handed

Domestic team information
- Years: Team
- 1942/43: Europeans

Career statistics
Competition	First-class
Matches	1
Runs scored	3
Batting average	3.00
100s/50s	–/–
Top score	3
Catches/stumpings	1/–
- Source: ESPNcricinfo, 16 November 2022

Hugh Mawdesley Lindley-Jones (22 June 1920 — 10 August 2015) was an English first-class cricketer.

The son of Francis Lindley-Jones, he was born at Bromley in June 1920. He was educated at Radley College until 1938, after which he trained to become a chartered accountant. Lindley-Jones served in the British Army during the Second World War, being commissioned into the Royal Artillery as a second lieutenant in April 1941. He was present during the Malayan campaign, as Japanese forces pushed British forces back to Singapore. In his capacity as a gun control officer, he based at Fort Canning. As the Japanese advanced into Singapore, he came under heavy Japanese artillery bombardment while attempting to retrieve a field gun, while on another occasion he assisted Chinese workers in emptying hundreds of bottles of whiskey to ensure they didn't fall into enemy hands. He was one of the first to learn of the Surrender of Singapore and decided to disobey orders to surrender by escaping with around a dozen other soldiers. Near the Raffles Hotel, they commandeered a small boat, hoping to sail out to a junk. While attempting to reach the junk, the small boat was holed, necessitating the need to swim the remaining half a mile to the junk; Lindley-Jones was among those who made it to the anchored junk, though others turned back and one man drowned. Once aboard the junk, they started its engine and set sail for Sumatra. He served throughout the war in the Royal Artillery, reaching the rank of major.

While serving in British India, Lindley-Jones made a single appearance in first-class cricket for the Europeans cricket team against the Indians in a Madras Presidency Match at Madras in December 1942. Playing as a lower-middle order batsman in the Europeans side, he was dismissed for 3 runs in their first innings by C. R. Rangachari, while in their second innings he was not required to bat. Following the war, he became a publisher and was a member of the Worshipful Company of Turners. He became Master of the Company in 1965 and was a member of it for 74 years; at the time of his death he was the Father of the company, being succeeded by Sir Brian Neill. Lindley-Jones died at Chislehurst in August 2015.
