= Catherine Neill =

British physician

Photograph of Neill, provided by the Johns Hopkins Children's Center

Catherine Annie Neill (3 September 1921 – 23 February 2006) was a British pediatric cardiologist who spent the majority of her career at the Johns Hopkins Children's Center in Baltimore, where she worked alongside Helen B. Taussig. Her primary interest was congenital heart defects; she discovered one type of defect, scimitar syndrome, in 1960.

Over the course of her career, Neill co-directed the Baltimore Washington Infant Study of the 1980s, contributed to 100 journal articles and 40 book chapters, and co-authored two books. In 1970, she was elected a Fellow of the Royal College of Physicians. She retired twice, first in 1989 before returning to work and being promoted to professor of pediatrics and senior consultant for pediatric cardiology, and then again in 1993, though she continued to volunteer in the Hopkins medical archives. Her teaching and mentorship ability held her in esteem among colleagues and trainees; according to Edward Clark from the University of Utah, at the time, “a place for women in medicine was hard to find," and Neill's "quiet mentoring and support was one of the reasons so many women chose pediatric cardiology, because they had such a strong role model and mentor.” Neill died in 2006 at 84 years old in nursing home care while visiting family in Wimbledon, London.

== Early life ==
Catherine Neill was born on 3 September 1921 in London. She was the eldest of four children born to Sir Thomas Neill, a health insurance executive, and his wife Annie Strachan Neill (née Bishop). One of her three younger brothers was Patrick Neill, Baron Neill of Bladen, who would become a barrister. Her other brothers were Brian and Desmond. Other members of her family worked mostly in law and literature, but Neill's interest in medicine was likely shaped by her father's contributions to the movement for passing the National Insurance Act 1911 and her mother's aspiration to study medicine (which was never fulfilled).

Catherine was educated at Channing School and attended the Royal Free Hospital School of Medicine from 1938 until her graduation in 1944. She was awarded a Diploma in Child Health in 1946 and an MD in 1947.

== Career ==
Neill began her medical career as a pediatric registrar at London's Queen Elizabeth Hospital for Children, where she worked alongside Helen Mackay and developed an interest in congenital heart defects, frequently going out of her way to admit patients with polycythemia, a disease state in which the hematocrit (the volume percentage of red blood cells in the blood) is elevated.

She travelled to Canada in 1950 to pursue a fellowship in pediatric cardiology at The Hospital for Sick Children in Toronto, where she worked with John Keith, and she moved to the United States the following year. She took up a post at the Johns Hopkins Hospital in Baltimore as an assistant to Helen B. Taussig, the founder of the field of pediatric cardiology and one of the originators of the Blalock–Taussig shunt, a lifesaving procedure to treat certain heart defects. While in Baltimore, Neill also studied cardiac embryology at the Carnegie Institution for Science, and a planned one year fellowship with Taussig became a three-year post. She returned to London in 1954 as a consultant at the Queen Elizabeth Hospital, where she worked with cardiologist John Maurice Hardman Campbell to study the natural history of adults with congenital heart defects, but in 1956 she requested to return to Baltimore; she remained at Johns Hopkins for the rest of her career and was appointed a professor of pediatrics at Johns Hopkins University in 1964. With Charlotte Ferencz, she co-directed the Baltimore Washington Infant Study of the 1980s, which studied the genetic and environmental factors in 5000 infants with congenital heart defects, also studying malformations in pulmonary veins. She contributed to many of the early articles on surgical procedures for pediatric cardiac abnormalities and early descriptive publications on cholesterol abnormalities among pediatric patients.

Neill discovered and named scimitar syndrome, in which blood is returned from the lungs to the wrong side of the heart, in 1960. According to Edward Clark, then chair of pediatrics at the University of Utah, Neill's 1956 publication in the Journal of Pediatrics, which detailed the embryological development of the pulmonary veins, was still cited as the best description of the topic 50 years later. She co-authored two books: The Heart of a Child: What Families Need to Know About Heart Disorders in Children (1992), aimed at parents, and The Developing Heart — A "History" of Pediatric Cardiology (1995). She also wrote 40 book chapters and 100 journal articles throughout her career. She was elected a Fellow of the Royal College of Physicians in 1970.

Neill first retired in 1989 after working at Hopkins for the better part of six decades, but she returned to work during a period of great clinical demand, receiving a promotion to professor of pediatrics and senior consultant for pediatric cardiology. She again retired in 1993 but continued to volunteer at Johns Hopkins, organizing papers in the institutional medical archives.

=== Selected publications ===
- Neill, Catherine A. (December 1956). "Development of the pulmonary veins with reference to the embryology of anomalies of pulmonary venous return". Pediatrics. 18 (6): 880–7. doi:10.1542/peds.18.6.880. PMID 13378917. S2CID 245103567.
- Neill, Catherine A.; Ferencz, Charlotte S.; Sabiston, David C.; Sheldon, Huntington (July 1960). "The familial occurrence of hypoplastic right lung with systemic arterial supply and venous drainage "scimitar syndrome"". Bulletin of the Johns Hopkins Hospital. 107: 1–21. PMID 14426379.
- Ferencz, Charlotte; Rubin, Judith D.; McCarter, Robert J.; Brenner, Joel I.; Neill, Catherine A.; Perry, Lowell W.; Hepner, Seymour I.; Downing, John W. (January 1985). "Congenital heart disease: prevalence at livebirth: the Baltimore-Washington Infant Study". American Journal of Epidemiology. 121 (1): 31–36. doi:10.1093/oxfordjournals.aje.a113979. PMID 3964990.
- Ferencz, Charlotte; Neill, Catherine A.; Boughman, Joann A.; Rubin, Judith D.; Brenner, Joel I.; Perry, Lowell W. (January 1989). "Congenital cardiovascular malformations associated with chromosome abnormalities: An epidemiologic study". The Journal of Pediatrics. 114 (1): 79–86. doi:10.1016/S0022-3476(89)80605-5. PMID 2521249.
- Neill, Catherine A. (1995). Clark, E. P. (ed.). The Developing Heart: A 'History' of Pediatric Cardiology (Developments in Cardiovascular Medicine). Springer Science & Business Media. ISBN 978-0792333753.
- Neill, Catherine A.; Clark, Edward B.; Clark, Carleen (2003). The Heart of a Child: What Families Need to Know about Heart Disorders in Children (2 ed.). Johns Hopkins University Press. ISBN 978-0801866357.

== Personal life and legacy ==
Neill was noted for her dry sense of humor. She was shy and fond of traveling. She never married.

Neill died in nursing home care in Wimbledon, London from cancer on 23 February 2006 while visiting family. She was 84 years old.

Neill was remembered by trainees for her teaching and mentorship ability. Edward Clark from the University of Utah noted that at the time, “a place for women in medicine was hard to find," and that he believed that "her quiet mentoring and support was one of the reasons so many women chose pediatric cardiology, because they had such a strong role model and mentor.” George Dover, a former Pediatrician-in-Chief at the Johns Hopkins Children's Center, commented that Neill was "probably more famous as a clinician and an educator than as a strict scientist." An obituary in The Lancet quoted Helen Taussig referring to Neill as "among the ablest I have ever trained". In its obituary for Neill, The Times referred to her as "a pioneer in open-heart surgery for children born with congenital defects" and "for decades a leading and influential figure in the field of pediatric cardiology." Richard S. Ross, then the Dean Emeritus of Johns Hopkins University's School of Medicine, wrote that Neill was "first and foremost a skillful and wise physician." She was posthumously listed in the Johns Hopkins Children's Center's list of influential faculty.
