= Adage (disambiguation) =

Adage may refer to:

- Proverb, a short expression of popular wisdom
- Adage, Inc., a defunct American computer company
- Adage Capital Management, an American investment management firm

== See also ==
- Ad Age
- Saw (saying)
- Saying
