= Richard Astley =

Richard Astley may refer to:

- Rick Astley (born Richard Paul Astley, 1966), British singer
- Richard Astley (Warden of All Souls) (c. 1625–1688), of the Astley baronets
