= Alan Rusbridger =

Newspaper journalist and editor (born 1953)

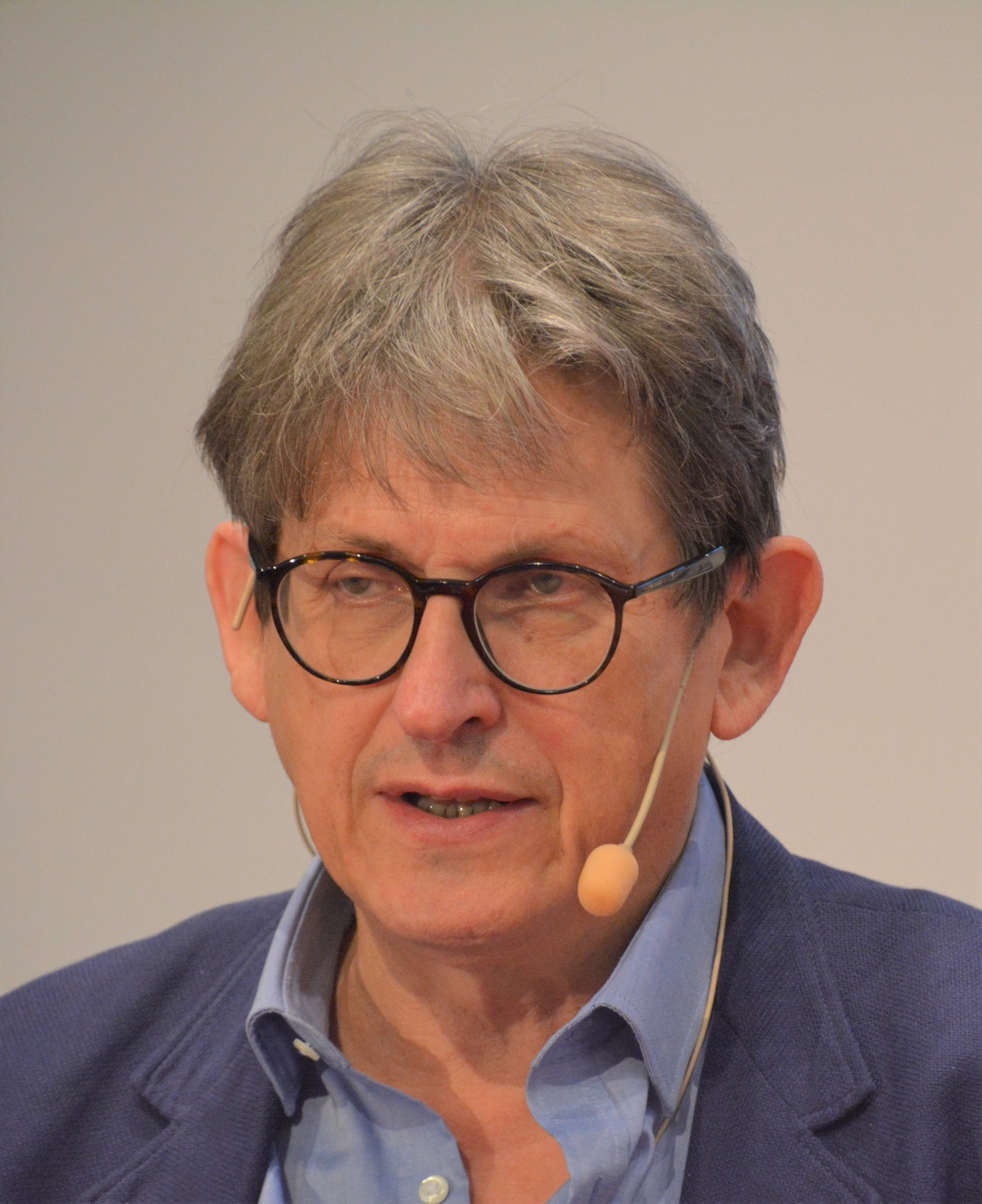
- Rusbridger in 2018
- Born: Alan Charles Rusbridger; 29 December 1953 (age 72); Lusaka, Northern Rhodesia
- Education: Magdalene College, Cambridge
- Occupation: Journalist
- Notable credit: Former editor of The Guardian
- Title: Editor, The Guardian Editor, Prospect
- Term: 1995–2015
- Predecessor: Peter Preston
- Successor: Katharine Viner
- Spouse: Lindsay Mackie (m. 1982)
- Children: 2, including Bella Mackie
- Relatives: Greg James (son-in-law)
- Awards: Right Livelihood Award

Alan Charles Rusbridger (born 29 December 1953) is a British journalist who served as editor-in-chief of The Guardian from 1995 to 2015, and Prospect magazine from 2022 to 2025. He was also the principal of Lady Margaret Hall, Oxford.

Rusbridger became editor-in-chief of The Guardian in 1995, having been a reporter and columnist earlier in his career. Rusbridger stood down from the post at the end of May 2015 and was succeeded by Katharine Viner.

From 2015 to 2021, Rusbridger was principal of Lady Margaret Hall in the University of Oxford. He was appointed chair of the university's Reuters Institute for the Study of Journalism in 2016. In 2020, Rusbridger was announced as one of the first members of the Oversight Board created by Facebook, with his appointment as the incoming editor of Prospect magazine announced in July 2021. He is an amateur pianist and published Play It Again, a book about his story of rediscovering the joy of performing Chopin Ballade No. 1 later in his life.

== Life and career ==
=== Early career ===
Rusbridger was born in Lusaka, Northern Rhodesia, a British protectorate (now Zambia). He is the son of B. E. (née Wickham) and G. H. Rusbridger, the director of education of Northern Rhodesia. When Rusbridger was five, the family returned to Britain and he was educated at Lanesborough Prep School, Guildford, where he was also a chorister at Guildford Cathedral, and Cranleigh School, a boys' public (independent and fee-paying) school in Surrey. At Magdalene College, Cambridge, he read English Literature. During the vacations of his first two years at university, he worked for the Cambridge Evening News as an intern, and accepted a job offer from the newspaper after graduation. He stayed with the Evening News until 1979.

He then joined The Guardian as a reporter, and subsequently wrote the paper's diary column and later became a feature writer. In November 1985, Rusbridger had a brief stint as a Royal reporter following the Prince and Princess of Wales around Melbourne. Fascinated by gadgets, at this stage he was already using a Tandy word processor and an early (slow) modem to file stories back to London. He left in 1986 to become TV critic of The Observer, then an entirely separate newspaper, before moving to America to be the Washington editor of the short-lived London Daily News in 1987.

After returning to The Guardian, he launched the "Weekend" supplement in 1988, followed by the paper's "G2" section. He became features editor in 1994.

=== Editor of The Guardian ===
==== Appointment and early years ====
Rusbridger was appointed as the editor of The Guardian by the Scott Trust in late January 1995 after a decisive vote of the National Union of Journalists chapel, management and trustees in an electoral college.

As editor, he defended the paper against a number of high-profile defamation suits, including those from the Police Federation and the Conservative MPs, Neil Hamilton and Jonathan Aitken. In the case involving Hamilton and the lobbyist Ian Greer, he said: "They weren't going to fight us in the court so they tried to do it through the TV studio." Rusbridger countered them by being available for TV interviews over three days to ensure that their version of events did not gain precedence. Hamilton's case collapsed shortly before a court hearing, while Aitken was demonstrated to have perjured himself, and served a prison sentence as a result.

Seen early in his editorship as a modernising new broom, he commented in June 1997 shortly after the election of Tony Blair's first New Labour government that the "old" Guardian: "opposed lots of things the Tories did which we'd now think weren't terribly bad in retrospect ... I mean, a lot of the trade union stuff doesn't seem as horrendous now as it seemed at the time." From around 1997, he oversaw the launch and development of the newspaper's website, initially known as Guardian Unlimited.

==== Berliner, digital and corporate ====
In September 2005, The Guardian responded to the tabloid re-launches of The Times and The Independent by moving from a broadsheet format to the "Berliner" format, which is common in the rest of Europe. The print edition of the newspaper still accounted for about 75% of the company's revenue around 2012. In a profile of Rusbridger though, published in the New Statesman at the end of May 2012, former newspaper editor Peter Wilby cast doubt on whether Rusbridger's enthusiasm for online journalism, freely available without a paywall, and the large amount of money invested by the group, would ever gain a return or ensure the long-term survival of the newspaper.

Until May 2016, he was a member of the board of Guardian News and Media, of the main board of the Guardian Media Group and of the Scott Trust, which owns The Guardian and The Observer, of which he was executive editor. Rusbridger received £471,000 in pay and benefits in 2008–2009, but then volunteered to a series of pay cuts, bringing his revenue to £395,000 in the fiscal year 2012.

He expanded the publishing bases of the paper, opening American and Australian editions.

==== WikiLeaks and Snowden disclosures ====
As editor-in-chief, in August 2013 Rusbridger took the decision to destroy hard drives containing information leaked to The Guardian by Edward Snowden, rather than comply with a government demand to hand over the data. An alternative action was agreed and in the presence of the authorities the drives were destroyed. Rusbridger described performing the task as "slightly pointless": "Given that there were other copies, I saw no reason not to destroy this material ourselves." Rather than cease publication of the Snowden material, Rusbridger transferred the editing operation to New York, sharing the material with The New York Times. He believed that the US First Amendment protection would make it harder for the government to intervene.

The Guardian shared the 2014 Pulitzer Prize for Public Service with The Washington Post. The Pulitzer committee praised The Guardian for its "revelation of widespread secret surveillance by the National Security Agency, helping through aggressive reporting to spark a debate about the relationship between the government and the public over issues of security and privacy". Edward Snowden said his actions in leaking the documents that formed the basis of the reporting "would have been meaningless without the dedication, passion, and skill of these newspapers".

On 3 December 2013, Rusbridger gave evidence before a Home Affairs Select Committee hearing on counterterrorism at the UK Parliament with regard to the publication of information leaked by Snowden. In its report, the Committee said that Rusbridger gave "open and transparent evidence", while National Security Adviser and MI5 officials declined.

In the film The Fifth Estate (2013), about The Guardian's former association with the WikiLeaks founder Julian Assange, Rusbridger was portrayed by Peter Capaldi. In Oliver Stone's 2016 movie, Snowden, Rusbridger played a cameo part of a TV interviewer.

==== Resignation ====
In December 2014, Rusbridger announced he would step down as editor of The Guardian in the summer of 2015. On 20 March 2015, The Guardian announced Katharine Viner as Rusbridger's successor.

Rusbridger was to have succeeded Dame Liz Forgan as chair of the Scott Trust in September 2016, but announced on 13 May 2016 that he would not take up the post. The expansion in the later years of Rusbridger's editorship led to unsustainable losses and several hundred job cuts were planned. According to a report in The Times in April 2016, staff were opposed to Rusbridger returning. Viner and chief executive David Pemsel were also opposed to Rusbridger becoming chair of the Scott Trust.

=== Principal of Lady Margaret Hall ===
On 17 December 2014, a week after it was published that Rusbridger was stepping down as editor of The Guardian, it was announced that Rusbridger had been elected principal of Lady Margaret Hall (LMH), a constituent college of Oxford University. He stepped down as principal in 2021.

==== Foundation Year ====
In January 2016, Rusbridger led Lady Margaret Hall to explore starting a Foundation Year for young people from under-represented backgrounds. It was based on a 20-year project at Trinity College, Dublin.

Announcing the scheme, Rusbridger wrote: "there are groups of young people today who are markedly under-represented at Oxford, even if it is not quite right to call them "excluded". They are as bright, resourceful and determined as anyone who has succeeded in getting here, but many things may have conspired to stop them even considering Oxford as an option."

The move was welcomed by the Vice Chancellor of Oxford, Louise Richardson. She told The Guardian: "One of the many advantages of the collegiate system is that it allows us to engage in a small scale pilot like this to help us identify innovative ways to recruit under-represented groups. I wish the programme at Lady Margaret Hall every success."

The fully funded scheme was launched in October 2016 with the first 10 students, and each year since between 8 and 10 years students have taken part.

Cambridge University announced it would be starting its own fully-funded Foundation year scheme. The first 42 students were admitted in October 2022. Oxford University announced it would also be starting a Foundation Year, involving 10 colleges, to start in 2023.

==== The Times Investigation ====
In April 2022, The Times released an investigation into Rusbridger's conduct while college Principal. A student said she was made to sign a gagging order contained within a separate agreement by Rusbridger and his administration after she accused another student of sexually assaulting her. Ostensibly outlining precautionary safety arrangements, the agreement also stipulated the student must "not make any information about the allegations, the police investigation or Lady Margaret Hall safeguarding arrangements available to any form of public media" under threat of expulsion from the college. Rusbridger denied it was a gagging order but said the college "asked both parties to refrain from public comment while the case was active". Once the student sought legal help, she said Rusbridger "tried desperately to convince her not to complain". The college, under Rusbridger's successor, later settled the personal injury claim, paying the student's damages and legal costs.

The Times article also details the accounts of eight other students whose experiences corroborate that of the original student. Repeated failures are detailed by the students who felt let down by the college's welfare and safeguarding systems and the responses of staff to allegations of sexual assault while Rusbridger was Principal.

The-then Acting Principal of Lady Margaret Hall, Christine Gerrard, said "LMH has recognised that there is scope for improvement in our non-academic disciplinary procedures, which includes how the college deals with allegations of sexual assault and harassment. We have established a working party, with external members, which is currently reviewing these procedures" and agreed to become the first Oxford University college to sign the government backed Can't Buy My Silence pledge to not use non-disclosure agreements (NDAs).

In response to the article, the Charity Commission announced it was in urgent contact with the college over its failure, as a registered charity, to make a "serious incident report" when the original assault was reported. Michelle Donelan, then Minister of State for Higher and Further Education, said the college's decision was "morally bankrupt" and Lady Margaret Hall should be "ashamed".

=== Other activities ===
He is visiting Fellow of Nuffield College, Oxford, and visiting professor of history at Queen Mary, University of London. Between 2004 and 2013, he was chair of the National Youth Orchestra of Great Britain. He is a governor of the Ditchley Foundation, an organisation which exists to promote international relations, and 10:10, a British climate change campaign for a 10% reduction in carbon emissions in 2010.

He is an amateur pianist and performed Chopin's Ballade No. 1 for the television channel More4 in "Rusbridger vs Chopin", where he speaks about the difficulties of taking on a piece considered by many professional pianists as daunting.

Rusbridger appears in the 2016 film Snowden, with a cameo role as a meeting moderator.

He has written three children's books, as well as being the co-author (with Ronan Bennett) of a BBC drama, Fields of Gold.

In 2014, he received the Special Award from the European Press Prize for his leading role in the NSA revelations. In 2020, he joined its panel of judges.

In 2020 Rusbridger was appointed to the oversight board of Meta Platforms, the parent company of prominent social media companies, including Facebook and Instagram.

On 29 September 2020, the office of the Irish Taoiseach announced that Rusbridger was to be a member of Ireland's Future of Media Commission, a body to make recommendations about the future of the country's news media. Máiría Cahill called upon Rusbridger to resign from this position because in October 2014 The Guardian carried an article critical of her claims to have been a victim of sexual abuse by a former IRA member. The reporter was Roy Greenslade who, at the time, had not acknowledged that he was an IRA supporter who wrote under the pseudonym 'George King' for the newspaper An Phoblacht for many years. Rusbringer said: "I did not read this piece either before or after publication" but his company email address had responded to complaints about the article which Rusbringer said was a "managing editor" acting on his behalf; there was no mention of such an editor in a single email from his address. Rusbridger announced his resignation from the commission on 14 March 2021.

Rusbridger is played by Toby Jones in the 2025 ITV drama about the News International phone hacking scandal, The Hack.

=== Personal life and honours ===
In 1982, he married the educationalist Lindsay Mackie, daughter of the politician and farmer George Mackie, Baron Mackie of Benshie. She helped found the educational charity FILMCLUB. They have two daughters, including Isabella Rusbridger (born 28 July 1983), a journalist and author, who is known professionally as Bella Mackie to distinguish herself from her father. Her novel How to Kill Your Family, released in June 2021, became a Sunday Times bestseller and sold over a million copies. She is married to BBC Radio 1 presenter Greg James.

Rusbridger received an Honorary Doctorate of Letters from the University of Lincoln in September 2009, from the University of Kingston in January 2010 and from the University of Oslo in September 2014.

He was one of the 2014 recipients of the Right Livelihood Award.

== Bibliography ==
- A concise history of the sex manual, 1886-1986 (1986) ISBN 0571135196
- The Guardian Year (1994) edited by Alan Rusbridger ISBN 1-85702-265-3
- The Coldest Day in the Zoo (2004) ISBN 0-14-131745-0
- The Wildest Day at the Zoo (2005) ISBN 0-14-131933-X
- The Smelliest Day at the Zoo (2007) ISBN 0-14-132068-0
- Play It Again: An Amateur Against the Impossible (2012) ISBN 0224093770
- Breaking News: The Remaking of Journalism and Why It Matters Now (6 September 2018) ISBN 978-1786890931
- News: And How to Use It (26 November 2020) ISBN 9781838851613

Academic offices
Preceded by Frances Lannon	Principal of Lady Margaret Hall, Oxford; 2015–2021	Succeeded by Stephen Blyth
Media offices
Preceded by Jonathan Fenby	Deputy Editor of The Guardian; 1993–1995	Succeeded by Georgina Henry
Preceded by Peter Preston	Editor of The Guardian; 1995–2015	Succeeded by Katharine Viner
