= Aprio =

Accounting and business advisory firm

- Formerly: Habif Arogeti & Wynne
- Industry: Professional Services
- Founded: 1952; 74 years ago
- Headquarters: Atlanta, Georgia, United States
- Area served: Worldwide
- Key people: Richard Kopelman (Chief Executive Officer)
- Services: Accounting Services, audit, tax, financial Advisory
- Number of employees: 1,500 (2024)
- Website: www.aprio.com

Aprio (formerly Habif Arogeti & Wynne) is an American accounting and business advisory firm headquartered in Atlanta, Georgia.

The firm's services include advisory, audit, tax, outsourcing and private client services. The firm provides advisory, audit, tax, wealth management, and private client services in all fifty states and over 50 countries.

== History ==
Isaac Habif and Jimmy Arogeti founded the firm in 1952. Merrill Wynne later joined the firm in 1962, becoming a Partner in 1970.

In late 2013, the firm added commercial real estate tax consulting to its services and announced it was merging with JRZ, LLC, an Atlanta-based real estate tax firm.

In 2015, HA&W began a re-brand to the name Aprio, LLP.

Between 2017 and 2023, Aprio completed more than 20 mergers and acquisitions including Henderson & Godbee, Leaf Saltzman, RINA, and Ladd Robbins. In 2022, Aprio was the 35th largest US firm by revenue according to Inside Public Accounting.

In 2023, Aprio finalized a strategic combination with Washington D.C.–based Aronson, LLC, marking the firm’s largest transaction to date. Also in 2023, a federal judge considered certifying a class action lawsuit in a case involving the alleged promotion of syndicated conservation easements.

Due to its rapid expansion, Aprio was ranked as the fastest growing firm in the United States by Accounting Today. In 2024, Aprio was one of the largest 30 accounting firms in the United States and the fifth largest accounting firm in Atlanta. In June 2024, private equity firm Charlesbank Capital Partners announced its intentions and ultimately acquired a substantial stake in Aprio, though the exact terms were not disclosed.

In May 2025, firm partner Lexy Kessler was elected to chair the upcoming term of the AICPA.

== Locations ==
As of 2023, Aprio had 24 offices in the United States, and international offices in the Philippines and Colombia. The firm has offices located in New York, Washington D.C., California, New Jersey, North Carolina, Georgia, Alabama, Massachusetts, Colorado, Arizona, and Florida.

Aprio’s headquarters are located in Atlanta, Georgia.

== Operations ==
Aprio’s services include advisory, audit, tax, staffing, wealth management, and private client services. The firm serves clients in industries including Manufacturing and Distribution, Non-Profit, Professional Services, Real Estate, Construction, Retail, Franchise and Hospitality, Government Contracting, and Technology and Blockchain.

In 2025 the group established its legal practice with the acquisition of an Arizona-based law firm to form a new law firm, Aprio Legal.

The firm serves clients in all 50 states and over 50 countries worldwide.
