= Michael R. Eisenson =

American money manager

- Education: Williams College; Yale University
- Occupation: Private equity investor
- Employer: Charlesbank Capital Partners

Michael R. Eisenson is a managing director and co-chairman of Charlesbank Capital Partners, LLC, a private equity investment firm based in Boston and New York. Eisenson co-founded the firm in 1998 and served as its CEO until 2017. Charlesbank raised its most recent fund, Charlesbank Equity Fund IX, in 2017, with $2.75 billion of investor commitments.

== Education ==
Eisenson earned a BA in economics summa cum laude from Williams College, where he now serves as chairman of the Board of Trustees, and a JD/MBA (1981) from Yale University.

== Career ==
Eisenson previously managed certain assets of Harvard Management Company, where he worked from 1986 until the founding of Charlesbank, ultimately rising to managing director. From 1986 to 1988, Eisenson worked with a branch of Harvard Management Company, Harvard Private Capital Group, Inc., which solely managed the investment portfolio of Harvard University. Prior to his tenure at Harvard Management Company, Eisenson was with the management consulting firm, Boston Consulting Group.

While at Harvard Management Company, Eisenson was the Harvard representative on the Board of Harken Energy when Harken purchased Spectrum VII, the oil company venture founded by George W. Bush. Harvard ultimately made a small profit on the transaction.

A private equity firm, Charlesbank focuses on leveraged buyouts involving middle-market companies, companies with enterprise values of between $150 million and $1.5 billion. The firm has more than $5 billion in total assets. Charlesbank invests on behalf of pension funds, foundations, and endowments. Eisenson has said that he knows he is not always investing in the most glamorous industries, but said, "What we’re looking for are businesses that are undervalued by other people. Our hope is to find the $20 bill that looks like $5 to other people." Eisenson has also said that he will not make money "off misery and poor people," by investing in things like collections agencies.

The name of the firm, Charlesbank, refers both to the Charles River that flows through Boston as well as the firm's history and connection to Harvard University, situated on the Charles. When the company was Harvard Management Company, the group managed a portfolio only for Harvard. Today, the firm has offices in New York City as well as Boston.

== Personal life ==
Eisenson is on the board of directors of Penske Auto Group and StoneCastle Partners. In 2017, he received the Myra H. Kraft Award for Non-Profit Leadership from the National Association for Corporate Directors. In 2011, he was recognized by the Outstanding Directors Exchange for his significant boardroom contributions. Eisenson is a trustee of The Boston Foundation, chairman of the Board of Williams College, trustee of the Dana–Farber Cancer Institute and Vice Chairman of the Board of Berklee College of Music. He is a founding director of Horizons for Homeless Children and was the 2013 recipient of the James J. Pallotta Award, given by Big Brothers Big Sisters of Massachusetts Bay in recognition of his significant contributions to help at-risk children.

Eisenson and his wife Barbara live in Boston and have four adult children.

Eisenson is Jewish and has pledged support to the Ruderman Family Foundation, which focuses on investing in the Jewish community and educational opportunities in Greater Boston.

Eisenson has contributed to the political campaigns of Barack Obama, Martha Coakley, John Kerry, and Mitt Romney, among others.

He enjoys skiing, travel, tennis, and music.
