= Scimitar syndrome =

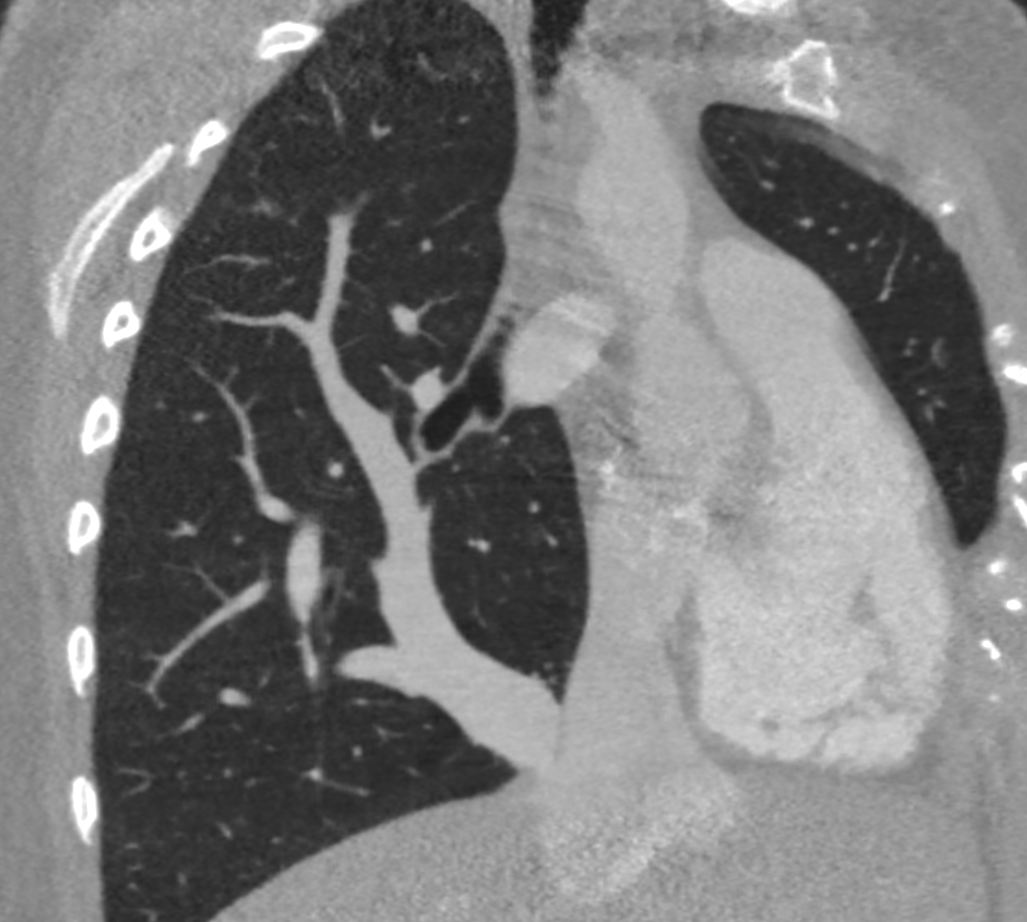
- Scimitar syndrome chest CT
- Specialty: Medical genetics

Scimitar syndrome, or congenital pulmonary venolobar syndrome, is a rare congenital heart defect characterized by anomalous venous return from the right lung (to the systemic venous drainage, rather than directly to the left atrium). This anomalous pulmonary venous return can be either partial (PAPVR) or total (TAPVR). The syndrome associated with PAPVR is more commonly known as Scimitar syndrome after the curvilinear pattern created on a chest radiograph by the pulmonary veins that drain to the inferior vena cava. This radiographic density often has the shape of a scimitar, a type of curved sword. The syndrome was first described by Catherine Neill in 1960.

== Presentation ==
The anomalous venous return forms a curved shadow on chest x-ray such that it resembles a scimitar. This is called the Scimitar Sign. Associated abnormalities include right lung hypoplasia with associated dextroposition of the heart, pulmonary artery hypoplasia and pulmonary sequestration. Incidence is around 1 per 100,000 births.

== Diagnosis ==
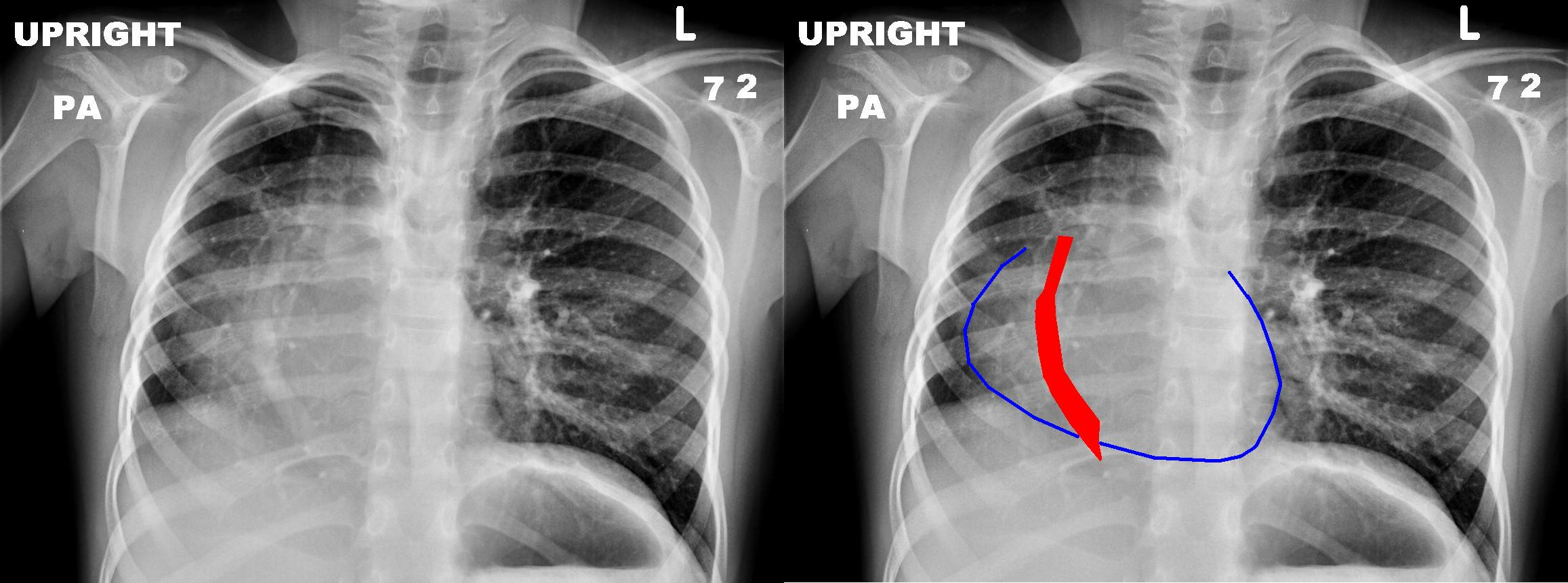
Chest x-ray of a five-year-old girl with Scimitar syndrome. The heart (blue outline) is shifted into the right half of the chest, and the anomalous pulmonary venous return (red) has a shape reminiscent of a Scimitar.

The diagnosis is made by transthoracic or transesophageal echocardiography and selective pulmonary angiography. More recently by CT angiography or MR Angiography.

Pulmonary angiography demonstrates anomalous arterial supply to right lower lobe.

== Treatment ==
Surgical correction should be considered in the presence of significant left to right shunting (Qp:Qs ≥ 2:1) and pulmonary hypertension. This involves creation of an inter-atrial baffle to redirect the pulmonary venous return into the left atrium. Alternatively, the anomalous vein can be re-implanted directly into the left atrium.

== History ==
Scimitar syndrome was first described by George Cooper and Raoul Chassinat in 1836 regarding a rare syndrome that has an abnormal pulmonary vein that drains into inferior vena cava below the diaphragm instead of draining into the left atrium.
