= Brian Fall =

British diplomat

Sir Brian James Proetel Fall GCVO KCMG (born 13 December 1937) is a retired British diplomat who was the UK's Special Representative for the South Caucasus 2002–2012.

== Education ==
Brian Fall was educated at St Paul's School, London, Magdalen College, Oxford, and the University of Michigan Law School.

== Career ==
After National Service in the British Army 1955–57, he continued as a reserve officer of the Royal Military Police. He entered the Diplomatic Service in 1962 and was appointed an established officer of the Service in 1965. He served in Moscow and Geneva before a year as Course Director at the Civil Service College 1970–71. After serving in the Foreign Office and as consul at New York he spent a year as a visiting fellow at the Center for International Affairs at Harvard University.

After another period in Moscow, 1977–79, Fall was head of the Energy, Science and Space Department at the Foreign and Commonwealth Office (FCO) 1979–80 and then head of the Eastern European and Soviet Department 1980–81. He then spent three years as Principal Private Secretary to the Secretary of State for Foreign and Commonwealth Affairs, serving three Foreign Secretaries, Lord Carrington, Francis Pym and Sir Geoffrey Howe. He then worked for Lord Carrington again as Director of the Private Office of the Secretary General of NATO before being appointed Assistant Under Secretary of State (Defence) at the FCO 1986–88. He was then Minister and Deputy Head of Mission at the British Embassy in Washington 1988–89, High Commissioner to Canada 1989–92 and Ambassador to Russia 1992–95. As Ambassador to Russia just after the break-up of the Soviet Union, Fall was also accredited to nine Post-Soviet states until they received their own ambassadors.

After retiring from the Diplomatic Service in 1995, Sir Brian Fall was principal of Lady Margaret Hall, Oxford, from 1995 to 2002. He was also an adviser to Rio Tinto Group and a governor of St Mary's School (Calne).

In 2002 Sir Brian was appointed the UK's Special Representative for Georgia, becoming a member of the "Group of Friends of the UN Secretary General on Georgia". This appointment was later expanded to cover the whole of the South Caucasus.

== Honours ==
Brian Fall was appointed CMG in the Queen's Birthday Honours of 1984, knighted KCMG in the New Year Honours of 1992 and received the additional knighthood of GCVO in 1994. He was elected an honorary Fellow of Lady Margaret Hall, Oxford, on retiring as Principal. He was awarded an honorary doctorate by York University, Toronto, in 2002.

== Offices held ==
Diplomatic posts
Preceded by George Walden	Principal Private Secretary to the Foreign Secretary; 1982–1984	Succeeded by Leonard Appleyard
Preceded by Sir Alan Urwick	High Commissioner to Canada; 1989–1992	Succeeded by Nicholas Bayne
Preceded by Sir Rodric Braithwaite	Ambassador to Russia; 1992–1995	Succeeded by Sir Andrew Wood
Academic offices
Preceded by Duncan Stewart	Principal of Lady Margaret Hall, Oxford; 1995–2002	Succeeded by Frances Lannon
