= Thomas Neill (insurance executive) =

Irish businessman (1856–1937)

Sir Thomas Neill
- Born: January 1856; Cookstown, County Tyrone, Ireland
- Died: 31 May 1937 (aged 81)
- Occupation: Insurance executive
- Known for: Pioneer of National Health Insurance in the United Kingdom
- Children: Catherine Neill (1921–2006); Sir Brian Neill (1923–2017); Patrick Neill, Baron Neill of Bladen (1926–2016)

Sir Thomas Neill (January 1856 – 31 May 1937) was an Irish insurance executive and pioneer of National Health Insurance in the United Kingdom.

Neill was born in Cookstown, County Tyrone, the son of a land agent. He first became a railway booking clerk, and then an insurance agent in Ballymena. In 1894 he became general manager of the London, Edinburgh and Glasgow Insurance Company and joined the board of directors of the Pearl Insurance Company when it took over the former company in 1910.

When the National Health Insurance scheme came into force in 1911, Neill was appointed one of the three Insurance Commissioners. In 1915 he resigned to become chairman of the National Amalgamated Approved Society, holding the post until his retirement in 1936.

He campaigned for the introduction of a Ministry of Health, which was founded in 1918, after which he became chairman of the Ministry's Consultative Council on Health Insurance Approved Societies until 1924. For this work, he was knighted in the 1920 New Year Honours.

He had four children, including the paediatrician Catherine Neill (1921–2006), the judge Sir Brian Neill (1923–2017) and the barrister Patrick Neill, Baron Neill of Bladen (1926–2016).
