= Thomas Hobbs (priest) =

Thomas Hobbs (died 1509) was a Dean of Windsor from 1507 to 1509.

== Career ==
He was appointed:

- King's Clerk and Chaplain 1494–1509
- Warden of All Souls College, Oxford 1499
- Northern Proctor 1491–1492
- Dean of St Stephen's Westminster 1504
- Prebendary of Oxgate in St Paul's until 1509

He was appointed to the eighth stall in St George's Chapel, Windsor Castle in 1502 and held the canonry until 1507, when he was appointed Dean of Windsor, and he held this until he died.
