= Benedict Humphrey Sumner =

English historian

Benedict Humphrey Sumner, FBA (8 August 1893 – 25 April 1951), usually known as Humphrey Sumner, was an English historian. He was a fellow of Balliol College, Oxford (1925–44), professor of history at the University of Edinburgh (1944–45) and warden of All Souls College, Oxford (1945–51).

== Biography ==
The son of the artist Heywood Sumner and his wife Agnes (a sister of Lord Charnwood), he attended Winchester College and Balliol College, Oxford. He served as an officer in France in the First World War until 1917 and then worked in the War Office, the Paris Peace Conference, and then the International Labour Office from 1920 to 1922. By that time he had already been appointed a fellow of All Souls College, Oxford (in 1919) and, after his spell in the ILO ended in 1922, he was appointed a tutor at Balliol College; he was elected to a fellowship there in 1925. He remained there until 1944, when he was appointed professor of history at the University of Edinburgh, but the following year was appointed warden of All Souls College, in which office he remained until his death in 1951.

As a historian, Sumner specialised in diplomacy and international relations and was involved in the creation of the Institute of International Affairs. He was also a pioneering expert in Russian history and combined his two interests by advancing British scholarship on the study of diplomacy in Slavonic Europe. He delivered the Raleigh Lecture at the British Academy in 1940 and was elected a fellow of the academy in 1945.

== Bibliography ==
- Russia and the Balkans, 1870–80 (Oxford: Clarendon Press, 1937)
- Tsardom and Imperialism in the Far East and Middle East, 1880-1914, Raleigh Lecture on History, read 7 May 1940 (London: Humphrey Milford, 1940)
- A Short History of Russia (New York: Reynal and Hitchcock, 1943)
- Survey of Russian History (London: Duckworth, 1944)
- War and History (Edinburgh: Oliver and Boyd, 1945)
- Anglo-Russian Relations, Montague Burton Lecture on International Relations, no. 6 (Leeds: University of Leeds, 1948)
- Peter the Great and the Ottoman Empire (London: Blackwell, 1949)
- Peter the Great and the Emergence of Russia (London: Blackwell, 1950)
