= Patrick Neill, Baron Neill of Bladen =

British barrister and peer (1926–2016)

The Right Honourable The Lord Neill of Bladen QC
- Neill in 2012

Vice-Chancellor of the University of Oxford
- In office 1985–1989
- Chancellor: Harold Macmillan; Roy Jenkins
- Preceded by: Sir Geoffrey Warnock
- Succeeded by: Sir Richard Southwood

Warden of All Souls College, Oxford
- In office 1977–1995
- Preceded by: John Hanbury Angus Sparrow
- Succeeded by: John Davis

Member of the House of Lords
- Lord Temporal
- Life peerage 28 November 1997 – 18 May 2016

Personal details
- Born: Francis Patrick Neill; 8 August 1926 London, England
- Died: 28 May 2016 (aged 89) Briantspuddle, Dorset, England
- Party: Crossbencher
- Spouse: Caroline Susan Debenham (m. 1954; died 2010)
- Children: 6
- Parent: Sir Thomas Neill (father)
- Education: Highgate School
- Alma mater: Magdalen College, Oxford

Francis Patrick Neill, Baron Neill of Bladen, QC (8 August 1926 – 28 May 2016) was a British barrister and a crossbench member of the House of Lords.

== Early life and education ==
A son of Sir Thomas Neill, Patrick Neill was born in Hampstead in 1926. He was educated at Highgate School and Magdalen College, Oxford. From 1944 to 1947, he served in the Rifle Brigade and became a captain.

=== Legal career ===
He became a barrister in 1951 and took silk in 1966. After heading One Hare Court, he became head of chambers of Serle Court in Lincoln's Inn when the two merged in 1999. He worked alongside Henry Fisher, Roger Parker, Gordon Slynn, and Richard Southwell QC. Lord Neill left Serle Court in 2008 to join his elder brother Sir Brian Neill, a former Court of Appeal judge, at 20 Essex Street.

== University of Oxford ==
He was Warden of All Souls College, Oxford, from 1977 until 1995, and appointed an Honorary Fellow in 1995. He was Vice-Chancellor of Oxford University from 1985 until 1989, and played a major part in the University's decision to undertake The Campaign for Oxford. He was an unsuccessful candidate in the 2003 University of Oxford Chancellor election.

== Family life ==
Neill was the younger brother of the paediatrician Catherine Neill (1921–2006) and of the judge Sir Brian Neill (1923–2017). In 1954 he married Caroline Susan Debenham (died 2010), daughter of Sir Piers Kenrick Debenham. They had six children.

Neill owned homes in London, in Perthshire, and in Briantspuddle, Dorset. He died at home in Briantspuddle on 28 May 2016, at the age of 89.

== Honours ==
Having been knighted in 1983, Neill was made a Life Peer as Baron Neill of Bladen, of Briantspuddle in the County of Dorset, on 28 November 1997. He sat in the House of Lords as a crossbencher until 18 May 2016, ten days before his death, at which point he ceased to be a member pursuant to section 2 of the House of Lords Reform Act 2014, having failed to attend during the whole of the 2015–16 session without being on leave of absence.

Coat of arms of Patrick Neill, Baron Neill of Bladen

Crest
A mount Vert thereon between two harps Or an oak tree Proper fructed Or.
Escutcheon
Gyronny of six Or and Sable three cinquefoils two and one Gules and three lilies one and two Argent slipped and seeded Or.
Motto
Respice Finem

Media offices
Preceded by Hartley Shawcross	Chairman of the Press Council; 1978–1983	Succeeded by Zelman Cowen
Academic offices
Preceded by John Hanbury Angus Sparrow	Warden of All Souls College, Oxford; 1977–1995	Succeeded by John Davis
Preceded by Geoffrey Warnock	Vice-Chancellor of Oxford University; 1985–1989	Succeeded by Richard Southwood
Government offices
Preceded by The Lord Nolan	Chairman of the Committee on Standards in Public Life; 1997–2001	Succeeded by Sir Nigel Wicks
