= Worshipful Company of Turners =

Livery company of the City of London

The Worshipful Company of Turners is one of the Livery Companies of the City of London.

The Turners' Company is one of the oldest Livery Companies in the City of London. Its origins go back to early medieval times: the first reference to a London turner dates to 1189, though the charter is dated 1155. The medieval Company was a trade guild, set up to protect the interests of its members, whose skill was to turn and shape wooden objects on a lathe. They laid down standards for their products; they had a strict system of apprenticeship; they restricted competition from outsiders; and they collected for charity and funeral expenses. Unlike the richer Livery Companies the Turners were craftsmen, not merchants. Yet at a time when many everyday necessities, like chairs, cups and plates, were turned products, successful London turners could make a good living by the standards of the day.

The contemporary Turners' Company reflects many of the traditions of earlier days. Its main objective remains to promote the craft of turning, which, in the 21st century, encompasses a broad spectrum of styles from the traditional and practical to the intricate and ornate right through to large statement pieces and avant garde works of art. Both professional turners and amateurs are members of the Company.

The Company promotes the craft of turning by running a major exhibition, known as "Wizardry in Wood", every four years. It holds turning competitions, and offers prizes and bursaries to established and aspirant turners. It supports the Register of Professional Turners, which gives details of leading turners and what they make.

The Company received its royal charter from King James 1st in 1604, and is 51st in the order of precedence of City Livery Companies.

The company motto is By Faith I Obteigne, or, in Modern English, By Faith I Obtain.

== Masters of the Turners' Company ==
- 1783: Onesimus Ustonson
- 1818: John Ustonson
- 1965: Hugh Lindley-Jones
- 1980–1981: Sir Brian Neill
- 1987–1988: Sir Leonard Atkinson

== Arms ==
Coat of arms of Worshipful Company of Turners
Crest On a wreath Or and azure, The figure of St. Catherine crowned Or, wearing a mantle azure furred ermine, holding in the dexter hand a Catherine Wheel Or and in the sinister a sword argent, hilted Or, the point downwards, [dressed in a pink gown beneath her azure mantle, with a gold girdle about the waist and a nimbus around her crowned head]. Mantled gules, doubled argent. Escutcheon Azure, a Catherine Wheel between two columns Or, in chief an imperial crown Or and in base a hatchet fessewise to the sinister, head downwards, argent, handled Or. Motto By faith I obteigne.
