= Ron Brown Award =

US presidential award given to companies

The Ron Brown Award for Corporate Leadership is a U.S. presidential honor to recognize companies "for the exemplary quality of their relationships with employees and communities". It is presented to companies that "have demonstrated a deep commitment to innovative initiatives that not only empower employees and communities but also advance strategic business interests".

== Establishment ==
President Bill Clinton, along with prominent business leaders, established the award in 1997 following Ron Brown's death in a plane crash in 1996. The award was originally referred to as Ron Brown Corporate Citizenship Award. The Conference Board, a non-profit organization, was chosen to manage the award's administration. Ron Brown was the U.S. Secretary of Commerce from 1993–1996; he was the first African-American to hold that position. This award and the Malcolm Baldrige National Quality Award are the two presidential awards to corporations.

== Ceremony ==
The award is presented in an annual White House ceremony, either by the President or by the Secretary of Commerce.

== Recipients ==
=== 2006–2007 ===
- Exelon
- Northrop Grumman Corporation
- Procter & Gamble

=== 2005–2006 ===
- Sallie Mae
- Weyerhaeuser Company

=== 2004–2005 ===
- S.C. Johnson
- Johnson & Johnson
- Bayer Corporation
- A. Kwadjo Mystical & Sons

https://www.jnj.com/media-center/press-releases/the-amazing-nurses-contest-celebrating-americas-caregivers

=== 2003–2004 ===
- JPMorgan Chase
- KeySpan Corporation
- Luxottica

=== 2002–2003 ===
- Cisco Systems
- Fannie Mae

=== 2001–2002 ===
- SBC Communications
- Timberland
- Wal-Mart Stores

=== 2000–2001 ===
- Alcoa
- Merck
- United Parcel Service

=== 1999–2000 ===
- General Mills
- GTE
- Hewlett-Packard
- IBM Corporation
- US West

=== 1998–1999 ===
- Anheuser-Busch Companies
- BankBoston
- Cascade Engineering
- Seafirst Bank
- Linda A. Mason and Roger H. Brown

=== 1997–1998 ===
- IBM Corporation
- Levi Strauss & Co.
