= Roger H. Brown =

American businessman and academic administrator (born 1956)

Roger Brown

President of Berklee College of Music
- In office 2004–2021

Personal details
- Born: 1956 (age 69–70) Gainesville, Georgia, U.S.
- Spouse: Linda A. Mason
- Education: Davidson College (BA); Yale University (MBA)

Roger H. Brown (born 1956) is an American businessman, philanthropist, and academic administrator and a former president of Berklee College of Music. Brown is also the co-founder of Bright Horizons and founder and chairman of the Salt Lick Incubator.

== Early life and education ==
Brown was born in Gainesville, Georgia in 1956. Brown graduated Phi Beta Kappa from Davidson College with a degree in physics and public policy in 1978. He then spent a year teaching science and math in Kenya before returning to the United States to attend the Yale School of Management, where he earned his MBA.

== Career ==
After his first year at Yale, he and his wife, Linda A. Mason, co-directed Land Bridge, a famine relief program on the Cambodia-Thailand border. Working under the auspices of CARE and UNICEF, the program served as many as 25,000 people a day and was the largest emergency food distribution effort ever attempted. He then returned to Yale, earning a Masters in Public and Private Management in 1982. He and Mason wrote a book about their experiences in Cambodia, Rice, Rivalry, and Politics.

After graduating, Brown took a job with Boston management consulting firm, Bain and Company, but left in January 1985 to co-direct famine relief efforts in Sudan for Save the Children. The program developed by Brown and Mason established many local food distribution centers, rather than a few centralized ones.

Returning to Boston, Brown and Mason co-founded Bright Horizons, which provided on-site child care for client-company employees, in 1986. Under their leadership, the company grew into a publicly traded company which employs 33,000 people (2019). Brown was chief executive officer until January 2002. He and Mason also co-founded the Horizons Initiative, now Horizons for Homeless Children, which provide services for homeless children, and the Bright Horizons Foundation for Children, which creates safe, enriching, and nurturing spaces in homeless shelters, domestic violence shelters, and other agencies. In July, 2012 Brown assumed the role of Chairman of the Board for Boston After School and Beyond. He is the recipient of the White House's Ron Brown Award for Corporate Leadership and the Ernst & Young/USA Today Entrepreneur of the Year Award.

=== Berklee ===
Brown assumed the presidency of Berklee College of Music in 2004. He is the third president of the college and the first non-member of the Berk family. A music enthusiast and avocational drummer, Brown had produced CDs of children's music featuring Ziggy Marley and Arlo Guthrie, among others, as a fund-raiser for the Bright Horizons Foundation for Children. Under his leadership, Berklee has achieved successive record enrollments and has also grown its online educational offerings through Berklee Online, becoming the world’s largest online music institution. This includes massive open online courses, and online undergraduate, graduate, and certificate programs. Brown also expanded the college’s reach to attract students from more than 100 countries, and created Berklee's Presidential Scholars and Africa Scholars programs to provide full scholarships to talented musicians. Since he became president, the college has also initiated educational institutes that offer focused areas of study, including Africana Studies, the Berklee Global Jazz Institute, Berklee Institute for Creative Entrepreneurship (ICE), Effortless Mastery Institute, American Roots Music, Popular Music Institute (BPMI), Berklee Institute of Jazz and Gender Justice, and Mediterranean Music Institute. Berklee’s City Music Program, which provides free music education to underserved youth, has expanded the Berklee City Music Network, which has partners across the U.S., Canada, and Latin America. During Brown’s tenure, Berklee has instituted a more selective admissions policy. All applicants are required to have an audition and interview, an effort that sends admissions staff to cities around the globe on the Berklee World Tour searching for talented musicians. Under Brown’s leadership, the amount of scholarship and financial aid available to Berklee students has increased by over 500%, growing from $9 million to over $70 million annually.

Brown has led the college to augment the student experience by establishing semester-abroad programs and by expanding the Boston campus through the construction of a new 16-story facility at 160 Massachusetts Avenue with dorm rooms, practice rooms, common areas, a fitness center, a dining hall/performance venue, and a music production complex. Brown negotiated with the city of Valencia, Spain, and the Generalitat Valenciana to create a Berklee campus in the Spanish city that offered the college’s first graduate degree programs as well as a study abroad program.

Brown launched the institution’s first-ever capital campaign, Giant Steps in 2011, which raised $54.5 million. The institution’s second campaign, Soundbreaking, closed in 2019, raising over $160 million.

In 2016, he oversaw Berklee's merger with the Boston Conservatory. The merger created an institution with comprehensive and dynamic training for music, dance, theater, and related professions. In 2017, a landmark public-private-nonprofit partnership brought together Berklee, the City of New York, and private donor to revitalize the historic Power Station recording studio in Hell’s Kitchen, which the college has renamed Power Station at BerkleeNYC.

On October 17, 2019, Brown announced that he will be stepping down as Berklee’s president in May 2021.

In the spring of 2022, Brown founded the Salt Lick Incubator, a 501(c)(3) non-profit organization and its associated YouTube channel, Salt Lick Sessions, to support diverse, emerging musicians with grants and collaborative opportunities to bolster their careers.

== Awards ==
- The Cruz de Honor from the provincial government of Valencia, Spain
- The March of Dimes Franklin Delano Roosevelt Humanitarian Award
- Honorary Doctor of Laws degree, Williams College
- Boston Arts Academy Foundation honor
