= Linda A. Mason =

American charity executive

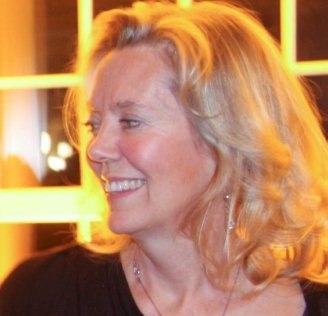
- Occupation: Business executive
- Known for: Humanitarian work
- Website: Bright Horizons site

Linda Mason is an American charity executive and chairwoman and co-founder of Bright Horizons Family Solutions.

== Education ==
Mason studied at the Sorbonne and the Conservatoire Rachmaninoff in Paris. Mason has a bachelor of arts degree from Cornell University and a master of business administration degree from the Yale School of Management.

== Career ==
Mason co-founded, with future husband Roger H. Brown, Bright Horizons, a provider of employer-sponsored child care, emergency back-up care for children and adults/elders, educational advising, and global work/life consulting. The company employs approximately 33,350 people globally and operates about 1,100 child care centers in the United States, Canada, UK, Netherlands, and India.

She is the author of The Working Mother’s Guide to Life, released in November 2002 by Random House. Publishers Weekly in its review noted that Mason "draws on her strong background in employer-based work-site childcare as well personal experience to outline steps working mothers can take to make their lives easier."

Mason has written and spoken in such venues as NPR, the MIT Sloan School of Management Leadership Series, and the Harvard Business Review, on early education and the issues of corporate work/life policies and challenges, including participating on White House work/life panels and initiatives during the Clinton administration.

Mason, with Brown, co-founded the Horizons Initiative, now Horizons for Homeless Children, a Boston-based organization that serves the needs of homeless children throughout New England, and the Bright Horizons Foundation for Children, which creates safe, enriching, and nurturing spaces in homeless and domestic violence shelters.

=== International work ===
Mason is chair of Mercy Corps, an international relief and development agency headquartered in the U.S. Humanitarian work with Mercy Corps has taken her to the Middle East, Africa and Southeast Asia.

Mason served as co-country director of Save the Children's emergency program in Sudan during the African famine of 1984–85, creating a national program that served 400,000 Sudanese famine victims. Mason also directed a feeding program for malnourished children in Cambodian refugee camps along the Thai border after the Vietnamese invasion of Cambodia of 1979. She co-authored the book Rice, Rivalry, and Politics (University of Notre Dame Press, 1983), which looked at the politics and the challenges of the Cambodian relief operation.

=== Non-profit work ===
Mason has held leadership positions on the boards of non-profit institutions, including chair of Mercy Corps, co-founder of Horizons for Homeless Children, trustee of Yale University, chair of the Yale School of Management Advisory Board, trustee of the Carnegie Endowment for International Peace, and trustee of the Packard Foundation.

== Awards ==
Mason was one of five corporate recipients of the Ron Brown Award for Corporate Leadership presented by President Bill Clinton.

She was the 1996 recipient of the Ernst & Young Entrepreneur of the Year Award.

She was one of Business Week's 1997 "Best Entrepreneurs". Bright Horizons was selected by FORTUNE magazine in January 2014 for the 15th time as one of the 100 Best Companies to Work For in America.” Bright Horizons partnered with First Lady Michelle Obama on her national “Let's Move!” child anti-obesity campaign.
