= Francis Leighton (priest) =

English academic and priest (1806–1881)

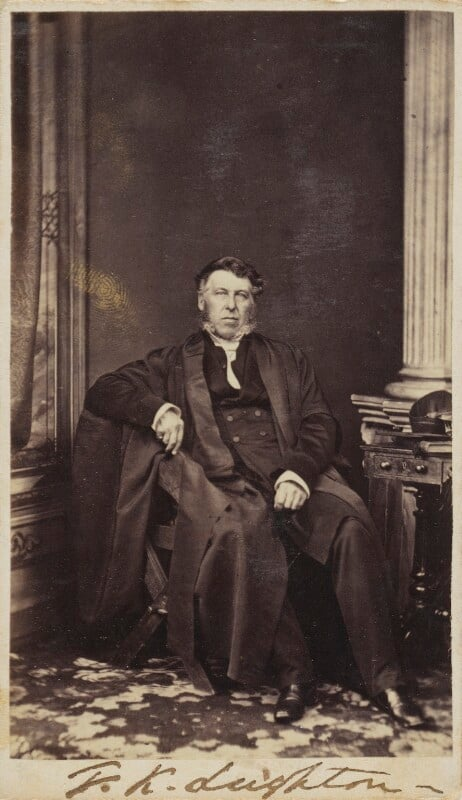
Leighton in the 1860s–70s

Francis Knyvett Leighton (2 July 1806 – 13 October 1881) was an English academic and priest, who was Warden of All Souls College, Oxford, from 1858 until his death.

== Life ==
Leighton was educated at the University of Oxford, matriculating as a member of Trinity College on 24 June 1823 at the age of 16. He was a demy (scholar) at Magdalen College from 1823 to 1829, obtaining a second-class BA degree in 1828, and winning a prize for Latin verse in 1826. He was elected to a Fellowship at All Souls College in 1829, which he held until 1843. He was ordained as a priest in the Church of England and served as Rector of Cardeston, Shropshire, and then as vicar of St Chad's, Shrewsbury, and rector of Harpsden, Oxfordshire. He was elected Warden of All Souls in 1858, holding the position until his death on 13 October 1881; as Warden, he was also rector of Lockinge in Oxfordshire. He was Vice-Chancellor of the University of Oxford from 1866 to 1870 (a post in which he was "distinguished by his courtesy and hospitality", according to his obituary in The Times), and a residentiary canon of Westminster Abbey from 1868 onwards. He died in the Warden's Lodgings at the college, aged 75, after a "long and lingering illness". He was described as being "distinguished by an amiable and refined, but genial courtesy".

Academic offices
Preceded by Lewis Sneyd	Warden of All Souls College, Oxford; 1858–1881	Succeeded by Sir William Reynell Anson
Preceded by John Prideaux Lightfoot	Vice-Chancellor of Oxford University; 1866–1870	Succeeded by Henry George Liddell
