= Stephen Blyth =

British mathematician

Principal of Lady Margaret Hall, Oxford
- In office 1 October 2022 – 30 September 2025
- Preceded by: Alan Rusbridger

President and CEO of the Harvard Management Company
- In office January 2015 – July 2016
- Preceded by: Jane Mendillo
- Succeeded by: N. P. Narvekar

Personal details
- Born: Stephen James Blyth
- Education: Christ's College, Cambridge; Harvard University

Stephen James Blyth (born September 1967) is a British mathematician and academic. From October 2022 to September 2025 he was Principal of Lady Margaret Hall, Oxford. He had been Professor of the Practice of Statistics at Harvard University since 2012, and was also chief executive officer of the Harvard Management Company between January 2015 and July 2016.

== Biography ==
Blyth matriculated into Christ's College, Cambridge, in 1985 to study the Mathematical Tripos. He graduated with a first class honours Bachelor of Arts (BA) degree, and was the 3rd wrangler in that year. He then moved to the United States, where he studied statistics at Harvard University. He was awarded a Master of Arts (AM) degree in 1989. His doctoral dissertation was titled "Local Regression Coefficients and the Correlation Curve" and his advisor was Kjell Doksum. His Doctor of Philosophy (PhD) degree was awarded in 1992.

After graduating with his PhD, he returned to England and was a lecturer in the Department of Mathematics at Imperial College London from 1992 to 1994. He then moved into the financial industry, working at HSBC, Morgan Stanley and Deutsche Bank. In 2006, he returned to Harvard University where he joined the faculty. He taught statistics in the Harvard Faculty of Arts and Sciences, rising to become Professor of the Practice of Statistics in 2012. He also worked with the Harvard Management Company (HMC) which manages Harvard University's endowment and related financial assets. By 2014, he was managing director and head of public markets. In September 2014, he was announced as the next president and chief executive officer of the Harvard Management Company: he took up the post on 1 January 2015. He took medical leave from 23 May 2016, and stepped down as CEO on 27 July 2016.

In December 2021, Blyth was announced as the next Principal of Lady Margaret Hall, Oxford. He took up the post on 1 October 2022 and was installed during a service in the College Chapel on 7 October 2022.

In September 2025 it was announced that he would in Autumn 2025 join the Financial Policy Committee of the Bank of England, to serve a three year term. On 23 October the Treasury Committee of the House of Commons approved his appointment.

== Selected works ==
- Blyth, Stephen (2013). Introduction to Quantitative Finance. Oxford: Oxford University Press. ISBN 978-0199666591.

Business positions
Preceded by Jane Mendillo	CEO of Harvard Management Company; January 2015 to July 2016	Succeeded by N. P. Narvekar
Academic offices
Preceded by Alan Rusbridger	Principal of Lady Margaret Hall, Oxford; October 2022 to September 2025	Succeeded by Professor Christine Gerrard
