= Christine Gerrard =

Principal of Lady Margaret Hall, Oxford
- Incumbent
- Assumed office 2025
- Preceded by: Stephen Blyth

Personal details
- Education: St Hilda's College, Oxford

Christine Gerrard is a British literary scholar specialising in poetry, political literature and women's writing of the long eighteenth century. Since 2025, she has been principal of Lady Margaret Hall, Oxford (LMH).

== Biography ==
She was educated at St Hilda's College, Oxford. She held a Thouron Fellowship at the University of Pennsylvania.

Gerrard was elected a fellow of LMH in 1990. She was director of The Oxford Research Centre in the Humanities (TORCH) from 2023 to 2025. In addition to her college role, she has been Professor of English Literature in the Faculty of English, University of Oxford since 2014.

== Selected works ==
- Gerrard, Christine (1994). The patriot opposition to Walpole: politics, poetry, and national myth, 1725-1742. Oxford: Clarendon Press. ISBN 978-0198129820.
- Fairer, David; Gerrard, Christine, eds. (1999). Eighteenth-century poetry: an annotated anthology. Oxford; Malden, MA: Blackwell. ISBN 978-0631206248.
- Gerrard, Christine, ed. (2006). A companion to eighteenth-century poetry. Malden, MA: Blackwell Publishing. ISBN 978-1405113168.
