= The Guardian Year =

Book on The Guardian

The Guardian Year (sometimes worded as the Guardian Year) is an annual, non-fiction, current affairs anthology book of what the editor considers the best content from The Guardian newspaper in the last year.

The book usually comes out in November of that year and includes a variety of topics, such as commentary on politics, art critiques, and editorials, as well as stories reported in Britain or internationally. The editor of the book varies from year to year, and — depending on the year and bookseller — the book can be found as a paperback or hardcover and is usually around 300 pages in length. The Guardian Year is usually published by Atlantic Books, and sometimes by Guardian Books or another book publishing company. The Guardian Year 2005 is the latest copy as of August 2006, and The Guardian Year 2006 has yet to be released.
