= Adage Capital Management =

American investment management firm

Adage Capital Management, L.P.
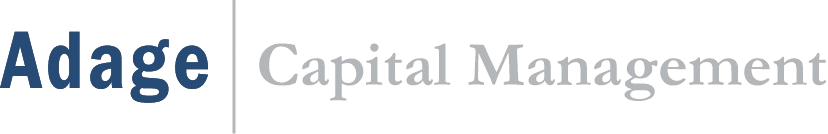
- Company type: Private
- Industry: Investment Management
- Founded: 2001; 25 years ago
- Founders: Phillip Gross; Robert Atchinson
- Headquarters: 200 Clarendon Street, Boston, Massachusetts, U.S.
- AUM: US$46 billion (June 2023)
- Number of employees: 53 (2023)
- Website: www.adagecapital.com

Adage Capital Management (Adage) is an American investment management firm based in Boston.

== Background ==
Phillip Gross and Robert Atchinson met as investment analysts at the Harvard University endowment in the mid-1980s. In the 1990s, some Harvard faculty and alumni criticized the institution for paying multi-million dollar performance bonuses to some Harvard Management employees. In part due to such scrutiny, the pair left Harvard to form their own firm, Adage Capital Management. They took with them an 18-person team and a $1.8 billion day-one investment from Harvard in exchange for an initial agreement (now expired) to pay ten percent of Adage's earnings to the university.

Adage invests primarily in the S&P 500 equity market universe, based on fundamental analysis.

Adage pays partial rebates of prior year fees to its investors when the fund's performance fails to outperform the S&P 500 benchmark. The firm has only had to refund its fees on a few occasions.

Adage has made private equity investments in startups and early stage companies, including Forter, GitLab, Gopuff, HawkEye 360 and Tanium.

Adage manages assets primarily for tax-exempt institutions.

In 2015, Adage was reported to be one of the world's top 10 largest hedge funds after its assets under management doubled in the last four years. It had an annualized return of 9.7% since inception which was higher than S&P 500 benchmark of 6.4%. However the next year for the first time it significantly underperformed the S&P 500 benchmark for a fiscal year with a return of 1.1% for the 12 months ending in June.

Adage was ranked third among all major hedge funds in the Institutional Investor 2016 Hedge Fund Report Card citing strong scores in Alpha generation, risk management, alignment of interest, infrastructure and independent oversight. However Adage received poor scores for transparency and investor relations as the firm was noted to be extraordinarily secretive and did not give out much information to investors or the media.
