= Bright Horizons =

United States–based child-care provider

Bright Horizons Family Solutions Inc.
- Type: Public
- Traded as: NYSE: BFAM; Russell 1000 component; S&P 600 component
- Founded: 1986; 40 years ago
- Founder: Linda A. Mason; Roger H. Brown
- Headquarters: Newton, Massachusetts, U.S.
- Website: brighthorizons.com

Bright Horizons Family Solutions Inc. is a United States–based child-care provider and is the largest provider of employer-sponsored child care. It also provides back-up child care and elder care, tuition program management, education advising, and student loan repayment programs. It is headquartered in Newton, Massachusetts.

Notable acquisitions since 2006 include College Coach, EdAssist Solutions, EdLink, the nursery operators Kidsunlimited and Asquith Court and the childcare group Teddies Nurseries, Sittercity, an online marketplace for family solutions, and GP Strategies.

== History ==
Bright Horizons Children's Centers, Inc. was founded in 1986 by Linda A. Mason and Roger H. Brown. Mason and Brown's Cambridge home was used as the company headquarters.

In 1987, the first two Bright Horizons child care centers were opened at the Prudential Center in Boston and at One Kendall Square in Cambridge, both on the same day.

Bright Horizons expanded to California in 1993 after acquiring Cornerstone West.

Founders Roger Brown and Linda Mason were named “Entrepreneur of the Year” by Ernst & Young in 1996.

In 1997, the company conducted a successful IPO and went public as BRHZ.

In 1998, Bright Horizons merged with Corporate Family Solutions (founded by former U.S. Secretary of Education and Tennessee Governor Lamar Alexander and Bob Keeshan, best known as TV's Captain Kangaroo) to form Bright Horizons Family Solutions, and changed their NASDAQ ticker symbol from BRHZ to BFAM. The company is named to FORTUNE Magazine’s list of the “100 Best Companies to Work for in America” for the first time, and would go on to make the list a total of 18 times between 1998 and 2019.

In 2000, the company moved its headquarters to Watertown, Massachusetts. That same year, London-based Nurseryworks and Dublin-based Circle of Friends were acquired by Bright Horizons, expanding its global presence.

The 500th center opened in 2003 – the Child Care Center at Citibank Service Center in San Antonio, Texas.

Bright Horizons began offering center-based back-up child care in 1992 with the first standalone back-up child care center for Chase Manhattan Bank. In 2006, the Back-Up Care Advantage program was established to provide in-home back-up child, and elder care.

In 2006, college advising company College Coach was acquired by Bright Horizons. College Coach founder and CEO Stephen Kramer joins the Bright Horizons executive team. Kramer becomes CEO of Bright Horizons in 2018.

In 2000, Mary Ann Tocio was named president and chief operating officer of BH. She retired in July 2015 and remains on the Board of Directors. Today, the company’s internal training platform – Mary Ann Tocio University (MATU) – is named after her.

David Lissy served for 17 years as chief executive officer beginning in 2002. He became executive chairman in January 2018. During his tenure as CEO, he was responsible for the company’s international expansion.

In 2008, the company returned to its roots as a private company in partnership with Bain Capital.

In 2010, the company launched Tuition Advisory Services, an employer solution working with employers to take a more strategic approach to their tuition reimbursement programs.

In 2013, Bright Horizons went public for the second time on the New York Stock Exchange, with stock symbol BFAM

In 2020, Priya Krishnan joined Bright Horizons' executive team. She was founder and CEO of India's largest childcare company, KLAY Schools.

== Notable Acquisitions ==
In 2006, Bright Horizons acquired College Coach, a college advising company.

In April 2009, the British-based childcare group Teddies Nurseries was bought from Bupa.

In 2011, the company acquired EdAssist, Inc. to expand the existing Tuition Advisory Services group, which would later be re-branded as the EdAssist Solutions group.

Also in 2011, Bright Horizons bought a majority stake in Dutch company Kindergarten.

In 2013, the company acquired EdLink, LLC out of Chicago, IL to further expand the EdAssist Solutions group

In 2013, Bright Horizons acquired kidsunlimited, which included 64 nurseries.

In 2016, Bright Horizons bought out the Asquith Court Group adding a further 100 nurseries to its care.

In 2019, the company acquired the tuition program management business at GP Strategies to further expand the EdAssist Solutions group

In 2020, the company acquired Sittercity, an online marketplace for family solutions out of Chicago, IL

== Deaths and Child Abuse Incidents ==
Bright Horizons operates more than 1,000 child care centers worldwide, including more than 700 in the United States and Canada, more than 300 in the UK and Netherlands and two in India. Bright Horizons employs over 30,000 people.

In January, 2021, the company was convicted of breaching Scottish health and safety legislation, and fined £800,000 at Edinburgh Sheriff Court; an unsupervised 10-month boy had died by choking two years earlier, a casualty that the court investigation blamed on inadequate staff training.

In July 2025, three Bright Horizons employees at the New York Columbus Circle location were arrested for child abuse. Incidents included covering a child’s nose and mouth with tape so that the child could not breathe, hitting children with metal, spraying a child in the face with bleach, and dragging a child by her hair from room to room. In October 2025, employees at the same location served a bleach and water solution to the children.

Vincent Chan is a former nursery worker from north London who was convicted of multiple child sexual abuse offences committed while employed in childcare settings. In 2026, he was sentenced to 18 years’ imprisonment after pleading guilty to more than 50 charges, including sexual assault of young children, making and possessing indecent images of children, voyeurism, and related offences. Investigators found extensive digital evidence on numerous electronic devices, including large volumes of illegal images and videos, some depicting contact abuse. The offences involved very young victims, and police subsequently contacted more than a thousand families whose children may have attended settings where Chan worked. The case prompted public scrutiny of safeguarding practices in nurseries and led to support measures for affected families. He worked for Bright Horizons for 7 years.

== Bright Horizons Foundation for Children ==
In 1988, the Horizons Initiative was founded to serve the needs of homeless children throughout Greater Boston.

In 1999, the Bright Horizons Foundation for Children was formed. Through the Foundation, Bright Horizons supports nonprofit organizations with a focus on programs for children and families. The Foundation is headquartered in Newton, Mass. Bright Spaces, the Foundation's main program, creates play rooms for children in crisis located in nonprofit and community agencies.
