= Jane Mendillo =

- Born: New Britain, Connecticut, U.S.
- Education: Yale University (BA, MBA)
- Occupation: Endowment manager
- Years active: 1987-
- Known for: Managing the endowments of Wellesley College and Harvard University

Jane L. Mendillo is an American endowment fund manager. She was the president and chief executive officer of the Harvard Management Company, charged with managing Harvard University's endowment. She led the investment team from 2008 to 2014, when the endowment was valued at $36.4 billion, having recovered fully from the 2008 financial crisis. Prior to leading the company, from 1987 to 2002, she was in charge of managing the endowment's domestic equities, venture capital, natural resources investments and charitable trusts.

After 15 years in various investment positions at Harvard Management Company, in 2002 she was tapped to be the chief investment officer at Wellesley College. She left Wellesley in 2008, leaving the endowment at $1.67 billion (up from its 2002 market value of $1.03 billion). In the summer of 2008, she returned to Harvard Management as President and CEO. Her time at Harvard was marked by 2008 financial crisis, during which the University was under severe financial strain, and the endowment came under significant pressure to provide substantial liquidity and perform.

In 2009, Forbes Magazine's 100 Most Powerful Women List placed Mendillo as number 37, before Margaret Chan and after Hillary Clinton.

== Early life and education ==
Jane Mendillo was born in New Britain, Connecticut. She earned a BA in English from Yale College in 1980 and an MBA from the Yale School of Management in 1984.

== Investment career ==
=== Harvard beginnings ===
Jane was employed by the Harvard Management Company from 1987 to 2001. She occupied various roles, including vice president of external management, in which she had investment responsibility for $7 billion in Harvard assets, including $6 billion in externally managed investments for the Harvard endowment, and $1 billion in Harvard pension and related accounts. Jane's other positions at Harvard Management included domestic equities investment, venture capital investment, and the management and investment of charitable trusts and gifts.

=== Wellesley's endowment ===
After fifteen years at Harvard she was tapped by Wellesley College in 2002 to create and lead their investment team. She was the chief investment officer at Wellesley College from 2002 to 2008 and was responsible for the investment policy and management of the College's endowment. During her tenure the college's endowment increased from $1.03 billion to $1.67 billion USD.

=== Return to Harvard's endowment ===
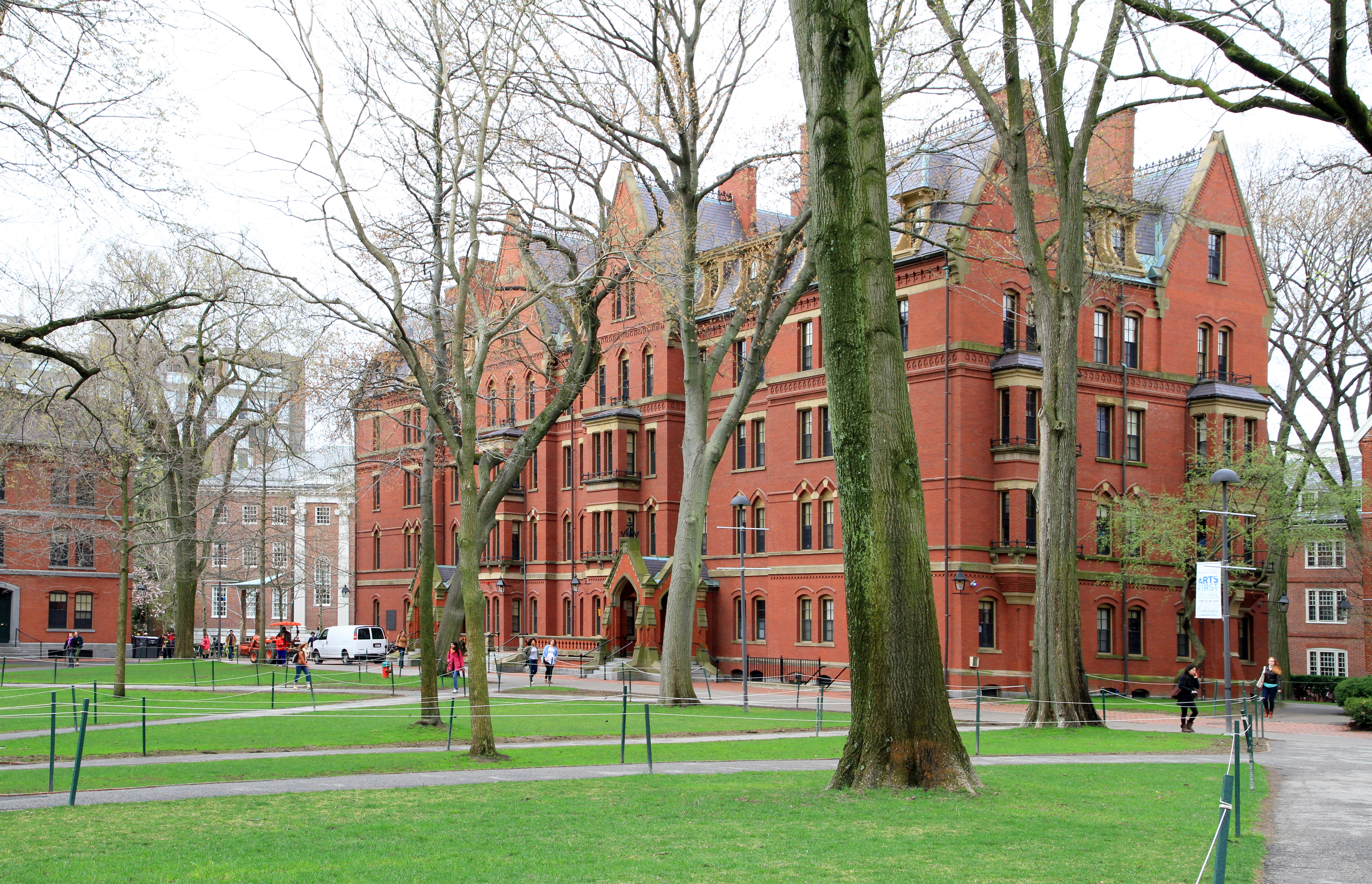
Mendillo spent 21 years at the Harvard Management Company, leaving in 2014 as its chief executive officer.

She returned to Harvard as its president and chief executive officer on July 1, 2008 and was responsible for directing its $36.9 billion endowment. She assumed leadership of the endowment management team just before the 2008 financial crisis and is credited with keeping the university's liquidity above water, although the investments suffered a sharp 27.3% decrease in market value in her first year at the helm.

As the markets recovered in 2010 and 2011, the endowment posted positive returns of 11%, and 21%, respectively. At the end of fiscal year 2011, as reported by the college's magazine, the endowment had recovered substantially, increasing from $27.6 billion to $32.0 billion, while simultaneously providing hundreds of millions of dollars to the University's budget.

After the 2014 fiscal year, the endowment posted a gain of +15.4%, increasing its value to $36.4 billion, the largest in among all US Universities. The endowment over her tenure exceeded both the University's long-term target returns and its market benchmarks. It was reported that her compensation from 2008 to 2014 rose significantly, starting at approximately $2.5 million, eventually leading to a compensation package of $13.8 million in 2014.

She retired from managing Harvard's endowment in 2014.

== Personal life ==
Jane lives in Concord, Massachusetts with her husband, Ralph Earle III, and their two children, Elizabeth and Thomas. Mendillo is a member of the Council on Foreign Relations and also a member of the boards of directors of General Motors and Lazard. She was previously a member of the Yale University Investment Committee, Rockefeller Foundation Investment Committee, the Mellon Foundation Board and Investment Committee, and the chair of the investment committees of Partners Healthcare System and The Investment Fund for Foundations (TIFF).

Forbes Magazine included Mendillo in the 100 Most Powerful Women list of 2009.

Business positions
Preceded by Mohamed A. El-Erian	Chief executive officer of Harvard Management Company, Inc. July 1, 2008 – December 31, 2014	Succeeded by Stephen Blyth
