= John Davis (academic) =

British anthropologist

- Born: 9 September 1938; London, England
- Died: 15 January 2017 (aged 78)
- Education: London School of Economics
- Scientific career
- Fields: Social anthropology

John Horsley Russell Davis FBA FRAI (9 September 1938 – 15 January 2017) was a British anthropologist, ex-Warden of All Souls College, Oxford, and Professor of Social Anthropology in the University of Oxford.

== Education ==
Davis was educated at University College, Oxford (BA Modern History 1961, MA) and the London School of Economics (PhD Social Anthropology 1968).

== Career ==
He was elected a Fellow of the British Academy in 1988.

He was appointed Professor of Social Anthropology in the University of Oxford and Fellow of All Souls College, Oxford in 1990 and was elected Warden of All Souls in 1995 (until 2008).

He was Chairman of the European Association of Social Anthropologists 1993/94 and President of the Royal Anthropological Institute from 1997 until 2001.

He nominated his immediate predecessor as Warden, Patrick Neill, Baron Neill of Bladen, for the office of Chancellor of the University of Oxford.

== Principal publications ==
- (1973) Land and family in Pisticci
- (1987) Libyan politics: tribe and revolution
- (1992) Exchange
