= Frances Lannon =

British academic and educator

Dame Frances Lannon DBE FRHistS
- Born: 22 December 1945 (age 80); Newcastle-upon-Tyne, England
- Occupations: Academic and educator

Academic background
- Education: Lady Margaret Hall, Oxford; St Antony's College, Oxford
- Thesis: Catholic Bilbao from restoration to republic: a selective study of educational institutions, 1876-1931 (1975)
- Doctoral advisor: Raymond Carr

Dame Frances Lannon DBE FRHistS (born 22 December 1945) is a retired British academic and educator. She was Principal of Lady Margaret Hall, Oxford.

Born in Newcastle-upon-Tyne, she was educated at Lady Margaret Hall (BA) and at St Antony's College (DPhil). After teaching at Queen Mary University of London and holding a Fellowship at the Woodrow Wilson International Center for Scholars, she was in 1977 appointed Fellow and Tutor in Modern History at Lady Margaret Hall. She was Vice-Principal 1992–97 and became Principal in 2002. She retired on 30 September 2015 and was subsequently elected an Honorary Fellow.

As Principal, Lannon oversaw a buildings project entitled the 'New Era Campaign' to increase Lady Margaret Hall's accommodation and seminar room space. The first phase of new buildings, Pipe Partridge, was completed in 2010 and enabled the college to offer all undergraduates the opportunity to live in college for three years. Further building works for the Clore Graduate Centre and the Donald Fothergill Building were completed in 2017.

Lannon is a Fellow of the Royal Historical Society. In 2006, she was a visiting scholar at the Australian National University Research School of Social Sciences and Australian Consortium for Social and Political Research Incorporated Centre for Social Research.

Lannon was appointed Dame Commander of the Order of the British Empire (DBE) in the 2016 Birthday Honours for services to higher education.

== Publications ==
- Frances Lannon, Catholic Bilbao from Restoration to Republic: a Selective Study of Educational Institutions, 1876–1931 (University of Oxford DPhil thesis 1975)
- Frances Lannon, Privilege, Persecution, and Prophecy: the Catholic Church in Spain, 1875–1975 (Oxford: Clarendon Press, 1987)
- Frances Lannon and Paul Preston (editors) Elites and Power in Twentieth-Century Spain: Essays in Honour of Sir Raymond Carr (Oxford: Clarendon Press, 1990)
- Frances Lannon, 'Women and Images of Women in the Spanish Civil War', Transactions of the Royal Historical Society 6th series, 1 (1991), 213–228
- Frances Lannon, 1898 and the Politics of Catholic Identity in Spain, in Austen Ivereigh, ed., The Politics of Religion in an Age of Revival (London: Institute of Latin American Studies, 2000)
- Frances Lannon, The Spanish Civil War, 1936–1939 (Oxford: Osprey, 2002)
- Frances Lannon, Lady Margaret Hall, Oxford: the First 125 Years, 1879–2004 (Oxford: Lady Margaret Hall, 2004)

Academic offices
Preceded by Brian Fall	2002–2015; Principal of Lady Margaret Hall, Oxford	Succeeded by Alan Rusbridger
