= Michael Mendillo =

Space physicist

- Born: Providence, Rhode Island
- Education: Providence College, Boston University
- Scientific career
- Workplaces: Boston University
- Doctoral advisor: Michael D. Papagiannis
- Website: http://sirius.bu.edu/people/mendillomain.html

Michael Mendillo is a professor of astronomy at Boston University. His primary research interests include space physics, planetary atmospheres, observations and models. He is a Fellow of the American Geophysical Union and a longtime member of the American Astronomical Society.

== Biography ==
In 1966, Mendillo received his B.S. in physics from Providence College. In 1971, Mendillo received his Ph.D. from Boston University in physics and astronomy.

Mendillo became a professor of astronomy at Boston University in 1985, where he presently works.

== Research ==
Mendillo leads a research group that has developed new imaging techniques for observations of emissions from the atmospheres of the Earth, other planets and moons. With the help of his research group, Mendillo led the discoveries of extraordinary large, tenuous atmospheres of sodium gas on Jupiter, on the Moon and in comet Hale–Bopp. He is also known for his work on Active Experiments, the research technique of introducing known gaseous perturbations into space plasmas, observing the effects, and deriving the basic physical processes that govern the system.

== Selected publications ==
- Mendillo, M (2006). "Storms in the Ionosphere: Patterns and Processes for Total Electron Content". Reviews of Geophysics. 47 (4) 2005RG000193. Bibcode:2006RvGeo..44.4001M. doi:10.1029/2005RG000193. S2CID 17109411.
- Martinis, Carlos; Mendillo, Michael; Aarons, J (2005). "Toward a synthesis of equatorial spread-F (ESF) onset and suppression during geomagnetic storms" (PDF). Journal of Geophysical Research. 110 (A7) 2003JA010362. Bibcode:2005JGRA..110.7306M. doi:10.1029/2003JA010362.
- Mendillo, Michael; Laurent, Sophie; Wilson, Jody; Baumgardner, Jeffrey; Konrad, Janusz; Karl, W (2007). "The sources of sodium escaping from Io revealed by spectral high definition imaging". Nature. 448 (7151): 330–332. Bibcode:2007Natur.448..330M. doi:10.1038/nature06000. PMID 17637664. S2CID 4363671.
- Mendillo, Michael; Withers, Paul; Hinson, David; Rishbeth, Henry; Reinisch, Bobo (2006). "Effects of solar flares on the ionosphere of Mars". Science. 311 (5764): 1135–1138. Bibcode:2006Sci...311.1135M. doi:10.1126/science.1122099. PMID 16497929. S2CID 8164778.
- Mendillo, Michael; Baumgardner, Jeffrey (1995). "Contraints on the origin of the Moon's atmosphere from observations during a solar eclipse". Nature. 377 (6548): 404–406. doi:10.1038/377404a0. PMID 7566115. S2CID 4332773.
- Mendillo, M (2005). "Effects of ring shadowing on the detection of electrostatic discharges at Saturn" (PDF). Geophysical Research Letters. 32 (5) 2004GL021934. Bibcode:2005GeoRL..32.5107M. doi:10.1029/2004GL021934. S2CID 17506190.
- Schmidt, Carl; Wilson, Jody; Baumgardne, Jeffrey; Mendillo, Michael (2010). "Orbital effects on Mercury's escaping sodium exosphere". Icarus. 207 (1): 9–16. Bibcode:2010Icar..207....9S. doi:10.1016/j.icarus.2009.10.017.
