= Lewis Sneyd =

Warden of All Souls College, Oxford

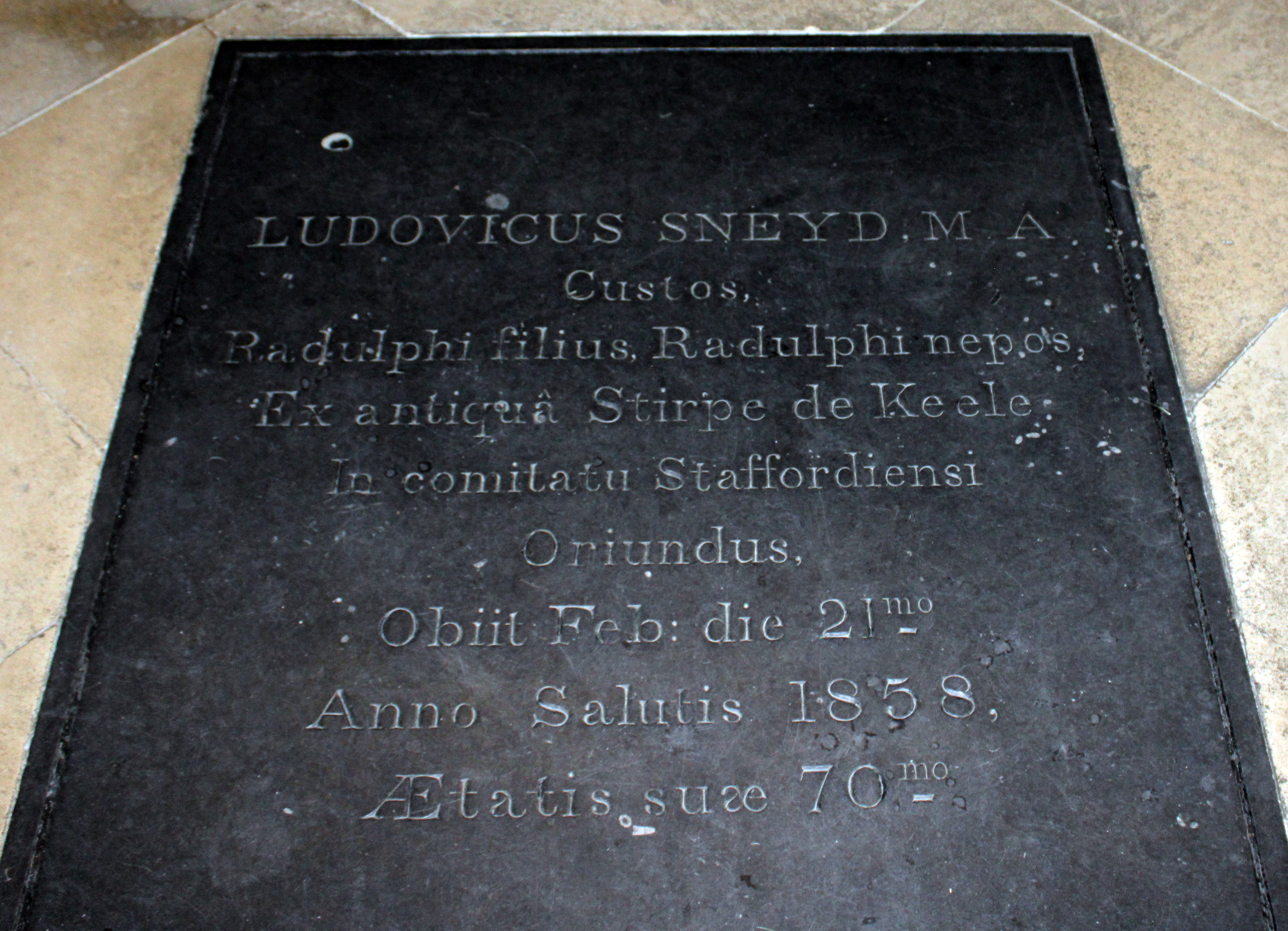
Inscription at the top of the black marble floor slab over the burial place of Lewis Sneyd in the antechapel of All Souls College, Oxford

Lewis Sneyd (14 July 1788 – 21 February 1858) was a clergyman, Warden of All Souls College, Oxford and curator of what is now the Ashmolean Museum.

== Life ==
Sneyd was born in London on 14 July 1788 and baptised at St Marylebone Parish Church on 10 August. His parents were the Revd Ralph Sneyd of the family of Keele Hall in Staffordshire and Penelope Moore.

On 24 October 1805 at the age of 17, Lewis was matriculated at the University of Oxford by Christ Church, and took the degree of B.A. in 1809.

Lewis Sneyd was ordained Deacon at Oxford on 25 May 1812 and Priest at Coventry & Lichfield on 20 September the same year. He was Vicar of Wolstanton, Staffordshire from 21 September 1812 to 9 August 1824 (and also appointed Domestic Chaplain to Other Windsor, 6th Earl of Plymouth on 20 May 1813). He was also Rector of Headley, Surrey from 12 January 1819 to 24 February 1830.

From 1809 to 1827 he was a Fellow of All Souls College, Oxford (where his father had also been a Fellow before his marriage) and in 1827 he was appointed Warden.

From 1827 he was also Rector of East Lockinge in Berkshire. Throughout the 31 years he held the Rectory he made it his duty to reside a certain proportion of each year in that parish, and hence the 1841 census lists him in the Rectory at East Lockinge, while the 1851 census lists him at the Warden’s house at 32 High Street in Oxford.

There are two portraits of Lewis Sneyd: one by Thomas Barber the Elder at Hardwick Hall in Derbyshire and one by John Bridges at All Souls College

In 1845 on the completion of the University Galleries building for painting and sculpture (now the Ashmolean Museum) he was appointed one of its curators. It was said of him “The Rev. gentleman never took any active part in the affairs of the University, and, with the exception of Curator of the University Galleries, we believe held no official appointment.”

After a long illness he was making arrangements to retire from both his positions, having bought a house in St Giles’ Street in Oxford for his new home, when he died at the Warden’s Lodgings in the High Street, Oxford at the age of 69 on 21 February 1858, and his funeral at All Souls College five days later was a private one. He was buried in the antechapel of All Souls College, where he has an inscribed black marble floor slab and also a stained-glass window in his memory at the west end.
