= Duncan Stewart (academic) =

New Zealand academic administrator (1930–1996)

Duncan Stewart (1930–1996) was a British academic administrator, and the principal of Lady Margaret Hall, Oxford, from 1979 to 1995. He was educated at Canterbury University College, New Zealand, and Queen's College, Oxford, as a Rhodes Scholar.
