= Charlesbank Capital Partners =

American private equity investment firm

- Type: Private
- Industry: Private Equity
- Founded: 1998; 28 years ago
- Headquarters: New York City and Boston (United States)
- Key people: Michael R. Eisenson, Michael Choe
- Products: Private equity funds, Leveraged buyouts, Recapitalizations, Growth capital
- Total assets: $23 Billion
- Number of employees: 180
- Website: www.charlesbank.com

Charlesbank Capital Partners is an American private equity investment firm based in Boston and New York City that specializes in the middle market. The firm has $23B of total assets across three investment strategies: flagship middle market private equity, lower middle market technology private equity and middle market opportunistic credit.

== Background ==
The founders of Charlesbank came together as Harvard Private Capital Group to manage the private equity investment portfolio for the Harvard University endowment. In 1998, they left the endowment to launch Charlesbank Capital Partners as an independent firm.

In 2016 Charlesbank established a credit investment strategy, and in 2019, it added a technology opportunities strategy. Michael Choe succeeded Michael Eisenson, a founding partner, as CEO in 2017.

== Funds ==
Across its three complementary strategies the firm has over $22 billion in Total Assets and employs over 180 people.

Flagship Private Equity Fund X – closed in January 2021, at its hard cap of $4.1B

Credit Opportunities Fund III – closed in January 2024, above its target at $1.5B

Technology Opportunities Fund II – closed in June 2024, surpassing its initial hard cap at $1.275 B

== Portfolio ==
Since its 1998 inception, Charlesbank has developed middle market experience and specific sector expertise with a focus on: Business & Consumer Services, Healthcare, Industrial, and Technology & Technology Infrastructure. Investments include Aprio and Front Row Group for the Flagship strategy, Learfield for Credit Opportunities, and Implan Group for Technology Opportunities.
