= Richard Astley (Warden of All Souls) =

Former warden of All Souls College, Oxford

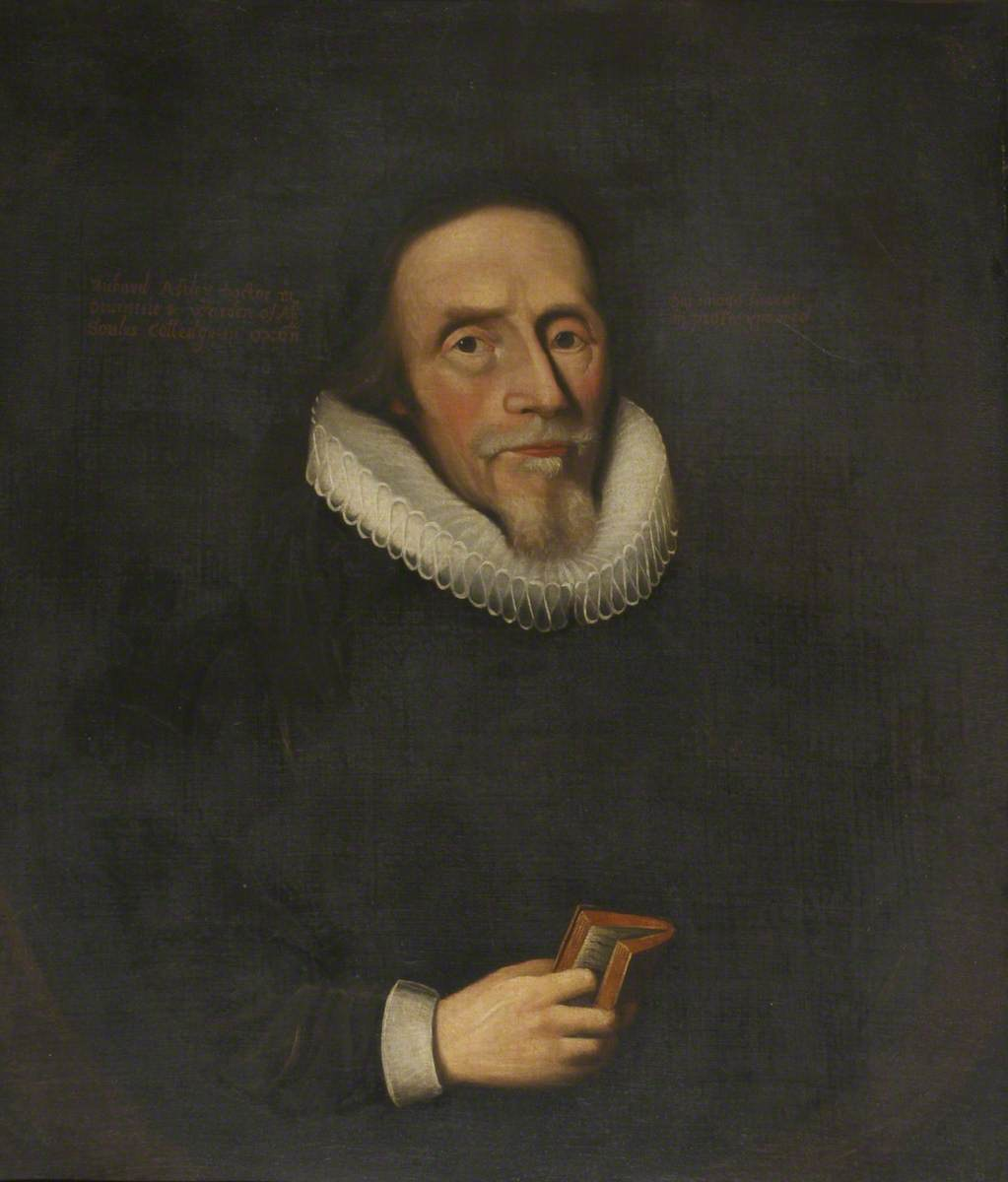
- Died: 23 February 1636
- Alma mater: Lincoln College; All Souls College

Richard Astley, D.D. (died 23 February 1636) was warden of All Souls College, Oxford, from 1618 until his death.

Astley graduated B.A. from Lincoln College, Oxford on 3 February 1593; M.A. from All Souls College on 9 November 1596; and B.D. on 19 November 1606. He is buried in the chapel at All Souls, and his will was proved at Oxford 27 April 1636.
