= John Vickers =

British economist

Sir John Stuart Vickers
- Born: 7 July 1958 (age 68)
- Awards: Knight Bachelor (2005)

Academic background
- Education: Oriel College, Oxford
- Thesis: Patent races and market structure (1985)
- Doctoral advisor: James Mirrlees

Academic work
- Discipline: Economics
- Institutions: Oxford University; London Business School; Princeton University; Harvard University

Sir John Stuart Vickers (born 7 July 1958) is a British economist and the Warden of All Souls College, Oxford.

== Education ==
Vickers studied at Eastbourne Grammar School and Oriel College, Oxford. He graduated with a DPhil from the University of Oxford.

== Career ==
After starting a profession in the oil industry, Vickers left and began teaching economics at Oxford University. From 1991 to 2008, Vickers was the Drummond Professor of Political Economy. In 2008, Sir John Vickers was elected as Warden of All Souls College, Oxford. His visiting academic posts have included the London Business School, the Woodrow Wilson School at Princeton University, and Harvard Kennedy School at Harvard University. From 2003 until 2007, Vickers was President of the Institute for Fiscal Studies and then became President for the Royal Economic Society from 2007 to 2010.

In 1998, Vickers became chief economist at the Bank of England for two years. He was also notably a member of the Monetary Policy Committee. From 2000 to 2005, he became the chairman of the Office of Fair Trading.

In June 2010, Vickers became chair of the Independent Commission on Banking (ICB) founded in the United Kingdom. The ICB's task is to consider both structural and non-structural reforms to the UK banking sector to promote financial stability and competition (in the aftermath of the banking crisis of 2008). The commission made its final recommendations to the UK government in September 2011, namely the introduction of the ring fencing of retail from investment banking in order to protect against financial riskiness.

=== Research and publications ===
Vickers has written on a number of varying economic topics. His current economic research focuses on competition and regulation.

== Honours ==
Vickers was knighted in 2005.

In 2012, he was awarded the President's Medal by the British Academy.

He was made a Fellow of the Royal Economic Society in May 2025.
