= Brian Neill =

British jurist

The Right Honourable Sir Brian Neill

Lord Justice of Appeal

Justice of the High Court

Sir Brian Thomas Neill PC (2 August 1923 – 24 December 2017) was a British barrister and judge.

== Biography ==
He was the son of Sir Thomas Neill, JP and the elder brother of Patrick Neill, Baron Neill of Bladen. He was educated at Highgate School, where he later served as a Governor for 21 years.

After serving as a captain in the Rifle Brigade in World War II he attended Corpus Christi College, Oxford, where he was later elected an Honorary Fellow in 1986. He was called to the Bar at the Inner Temple in 1949, eventually becoming a Queen's Counsel in 1968. In 1972 he became a Recorder of the Crown Court. From 1980 to 1981 he served as Master of the Turners' Company.

As is customary with such judicial appointments, Neill became a Knight Bachelor in 1978 on being named to the High Court of Justice, Queen's Bench Division and was sworn of the Privy Council of the United Kingdom in 1985 on being named a Lord Justice of Appeal.

From 1985 to 1992 he was president of the Society for Computers and Law and from 2009 to 2012 chairman of the Slynn Foundation.

On concluding his service on the Court of Appeal in 1996 he joined the Judiciary of Gibraltar, becoming a Lord Justice, in 1997, and President, in 1998, of the Court of Appeal there before retiring in 2003.

In 2015 he was appointed a Chevalier of the Légion d'honneur.

== Reading ==
- Essays in Honour of Sir Brian Neill: The Quintessential Judge, edited by Lord Saville and Richard Susskind, foreword by Lord Woolf and Lord Bingham, LexisNexis Butterworths, 2003.
- Telegraph obituary (subscription required)
