= Dennis Hackett =

British newspaper editor (1929–2016)

Dennis Hackett (5 February 1929 – 23 August 2016) was a British magazine and newspaper editor.

Hackett grew up in Sheffield, England, where he attended De La Salle College, then entered journalism with the Sheffield Telegraph in 1945. He spent 1947 to 1949 in national service with the Royal Navy, then resumed his career, joining the Daily Herald in 1954, then moved to Illustrated, where he was Deputy Editor. In 1958, he moved again to the Daily Express, then the Daily Mail, before becoming Art Editor on The Observer.

Joining the magazine Queen as Deputy Editor in 1962, Hackett later served as Editor, but in 1965 was poached by Nova,. Together with art director Harri Peccinotti, he established Nova for the people of Swinging London.

He stood down in 1969 to become a director of the International Publishing Corporation (IPC Newspapers), where the chief title was the Daily Mirror, then Britain’s biggest-selling red-top tabloid at 5 million copies daily. Hackett’s task was to launch a midweek colour supplement. The Mirror was not only a left-wing daily paper, but also in Hugh Cudlipp's view, "the first quality popular paper". Within that decade, only quality newspapers had launched free glossy colour supplements (Sunday Times, Sunday Telegraph, Observer), all of which had delivered boosts to their papers’ circulations.

Mirror Magazine published on Wednesdays, its October 1969 launch issue deciding on a future with the Butlins Redcoats for the 21-year-old Prince of Wales. Hackett hired an editorial team led by Mike Molloy, who went on to edit the Mirror itself. Others who made their reputations here included Eve Pollard on fashion (later editor of the Sunday Mirror and Sunday Express), Jeffrey Bernard, Delia Smith in her first writing role as cook, playwright Keith Waterhouse likewise writing his first columns, as well as screenwriter Arthur Hopcraft and the astrologer Patric Walker.

The magazine closed one year after launch because of faulty budgeting from the outset. At 5 million copies, this was the longest magazine run in the country using gravure presses. It had not been foreseen that those four-colour copper cylinders printing on the machines at Odhams Press in Watford would wear out halfway through the run. From the start, this doubled the weekly engraving bill in what was then the luxury printing process. Mirror Magazine closed in 1970 with a loss of £7million – a miscalculation by Hugh Cudlipp's company.

Hackett held numerous positions during the 1970s, including an associate editorship of the Daily Express, while writing books on the Bemrose Corporation and Ford Motor Company.

In the 1980s, Hackett became a television critic, working first at The Times, then for The Tablet. As a consultant, he organised the launch of You, the Mail on Sunday's colour supplement, then moved to Today, acting as Editor-in-Chief for a period in 1987. He called for tactical voting in the 1987 general election to benefit the Social Democratic Party. However, he soon left to become editor of M, The Observer's' colour supplement, then in the early 1990s was editor of Management Today.

Hackett died on 23 August 2016 at the age of 87. He is survived by his wife, Jacquie and their daughter; he also had a daughter and son from his marriage to Agnes, which ended in divorce.

Media offices
Preceded by Beatrix Miller	Editor of Queen; 1964–1965	Succeeded by ?
Preceded by Harry Fieldhouse	Editor of Nova; 1965–1968	Succeeded by Bill Smithies
Preceded by Bill Smithies	Editor of Nova; 1968–1969	Succeeded by Peter Crookston
Preceded by Brian MacArthur	Editor of Today; 1987	Succeeded by David Montgomery
