= Brendon Parsons =

British newspaper editor

Brendon Parsons is a former British national newspaper editor.

He edited both The People and The Sunday Mirror titles after six years as deputy editor of the Daily Mirror, the last two alongside Piers Morgan.

== Career ==
=== Early career ===
Parsons was trained at The Wimborne and Ferndown Journal in Dorset, moved to the Portsmouths News and Fleet Street News Agency in London before joining the Brighton Evening Argus in 1977, where he became crime reporter. He won the regional Senior Journalist of the Year Award at the age of 21 and rose to become assistant chief sub-editor before leaving newspapers to read law at Sussex University. Tempted back into newspapers by becoming the first journalist hired in two years at the Daily Mirror in mid 80s at a time when the paper was considered "the mink lined coffin" - so highly regarded and so well paid that no-one ever left.

=== Today ===
Parsons left two years later when headhunted by Today newspaper, the first ever colour newspaper. As chief sub-editor on Today during the late 1980s, he more than coped with a general shortage of trained subs in the industry and aided the achievement of Newspaper of The Year under editorship of David Montgomery. Many of Parsons' subs went on to senior positions on other papers including Daily Mail and The Sun. Today suffered in cutbacks and became part of the Murdoch operation at Wapping. Under editor Martin Dunn Parsons became Features Editor at Today, which he later described as his most difficult role in Fleet Street, though he managed to outfox most of the paper's competitors, with the exception of a young pop columnist named Piers Morgan, who visited from the adjoining office of The Sun and stood over a video copying machine, refusing to be distracted and preventing Parsons from bagging the exclusive new Wham release for Today exclusively.

=== Mirror Group senior roles ===
He returned to Mirror Group as head of production on Sunday Mirror under Colin Myler before moving to Daily Mirror as night editor and then deputy editor. Two years with Piers Morgan saw the paper regain much of its former regard within industry, breaking many scoops with highlights such as Parsons legendary return to UK of the 1996 World Cup football (front page showed ball being kissed by Geoff Hurst under heading It's His Now, a ref to iconic commentary at end of win over Germany as Hurst scored third goal: "They think it's all over..it is now".) The pair almost lost their jobs over the infamous front Page "Achtung Surrender" which declared "football war" on Germany during the 1996 European Cup. Fortunately for them, the German captain Jürgen Klinsmann saw the funny side. Parsons served as judge in the industry newspaper awards in 1996.

At the start of 1997, Parsons was editor of The People, when he moved to become editor of the Sunday Mirror. He subsequently became deputy editor of the Daily Mirror, in which role he introduced the Mandy Capp cartoon, derived from its existing Andy Capp strip.

In December 1997, Parsons was due to move posts again, being re-appointed as editor of The People. However, he was soon granted compassionate leave, and six months later his Sunday Mirror role was given to former editor Colin Myler. In 2000, Parsons stepped in to run Worldsport.com during its final months, while Alan Callan was unwell.

== Retirement ==
He retired to Lewes in East Sussex, where he recovered from a long spell in hospital. A divorcee, he re-married in 2009. He continues to engage with community, providing stories to local media and founding charity regatta on the River Ouse, for which he was named Lewes Man of the Year in 2016. He is Chairman of Lewes Rowing Club.

Media offices
Preceded by Bridget Rowe	Editor of The People; 1996–1997	Succeeded by Len Gould
Preceded by Bridget Rowe	Editor of the Sunday Mirror; 1997	Succeeded by Colin Myler
Preceded by Paul Connew?	Deputy Editor of the Daily Mirror; 1997–1998	Succeeded by Tina Weaver
