= All Saints Catholic High School, Sheffield =

All Saints Catholic High School

Location
- Granville Road; Sheffield, South Yorkshire, S2 2RJ; England; 53°22′24″N 1°27′26″W

Information
- Type: Academy
- Motto: Fortis in Fide
- Religious affiliation: Roman Catholic
- Established: 1976
- Specialist: Sports
- Department for Education URN: 138337 Tables
- Ofsted: Reports
- Headteacher: Sean Pender
- Staff: ≈ 182
- Gender: Coeducational
- Age: 11 to 18
- Enrolment: 1347
- Houses: Fortitude; Belief; Endeavour; Perseverance; Courage
- Diocese: Hallam
- Public Transit: B P Granville Road
- Website: http://www.allsaints.sheffield.sch.uk/

All Saints Catholic High School is a Roman Catholic secondary school with academy status in Sheffield, South Yorkshire, England.

== Admissions ==
The All Saints Catholic High School serves boys and girls between the ages of eleven and eighteen.

== History ==
De la Salle College was a direct grant grammar school from 1946 until 1976. It was located on Scott Road, in the suburb of Pitsmoor. The area is now a housing estate, featuring names that remember the past use of the site such as College Close and De la Salle Drive. The college was used in the war by the Royal Air Force as a barrage balloon unit headquarters for defending Sheffield from aerial attack.

The school in its present form was founded in September 1976 with the merger of De la Salle College (a grammar school) and St. Paul's school (on the current site). In 1983, the De la Salle site was closed and, along with the closure of St. Peter's RC School, many pupils and staff moved to the All Saints site.

The school's headteachers have been J. P. Kelly (1976–c. 2001), Robert Sawyer (c. 2001–2013), Clare Scott (2013–2017), and Sean Pender (2017 – present).

All Saints Catholic High School is currently situated on Granville Road (A6135), next to The Sheffield College in Sheffield.

=== February 2025 murder ===
At 12:17 GMT on 3 February 2025, police were called to the school after 15-year-old student Harvey Willgoose was fatally stabbed with a hunting knife. Emergency medical responders, including an air ambulance, attended at the school, which was in lockdown and had been cordoned off by police. Willgoose died shortly before 16:00.

On 28 April, 15-year-old Mohammed Umar Khan admitted killing Willgoose, but denied murder. He was found guilty of murder on 8 August. On 22 October, Mrs Justice Ellenbogen sentenced Khan to life imprisonment with a minimum term of 16 years, while also lifting reporting restrictions that had prohibited his identification.

== Mass ==
The school, which has a chapel and a chaplaincy team, holds Catholic Mass once a term.

== Facilities ==
The school has been awarded a Sports College status and is home to one of the biggest sporting facilities in England. A new sports hall was built in the summer of 2007. There are also nine AstroTurf pitches available.

As of 2011, a new school has been expanded (co-located) on the grounds, accommodating the needs of Special Educational Needs and Disability (SEND) students. This new extension is called the "Seven Hills School".

== Academic performance ==
It is one of six state schools in Sheffield that has a sixth form. Most schools that offer sixth form education are also former grammar schools. Sheffield College, which is located next door, also offers A levels.

== Notable alumni ==
Alumni of All Saints are entitled to refer to themselves as 'Old Toussainters', in line with the school's origins as De La Salle Grammar, founded by French monks.

- Matt Dickins, former Lincoln City and Blackburn Rovers goalkeeper
- Lisa Downing, academic
- Mark Gasser, concert pianist
- Jonathan Marray, tennis player; 2012 Wimbledon men's doubles winner
- Catherine Pickford, Church of England archdeacon

=== De La Salle College ===
- Martin Flannery, Labour MP for Sheffield Hillsborough from 1974 to 1992
- Dennis Hackett, former editor of Queen, Nova and Today
- Patrick McGoohan, writer, director, actor Danger Man, The Prisoner
- Andrew Pinder CBE, chairman of Becta from 2006 to 2009

== OFSTED report ==
=== Academy ===
An OFSTED Short Inspection Report was published in 2018, confirming the 2014 Full Inspection rating of Good, with aspects of the school's work needing improvement.

=== Pre-academy ===
A report at the beginning of 2011, before the school became an academy, showed an improvement in the school, which was rated "outstanding" by Ofsted.

== Construction 2010–11 ==
In 2010, the school began to undergo construction to build new facilities and an entirely new building. The work was due to finish in September 2011. When completed, the school would be able to accommodate an additional 100–200 pupils from Seven Hills. The reason for this was that the school agreed to let Seven Hills' new school be built, meaning All Saints and Seven Hills would both have new equipment.
