= Richard Stott =

British journalist and editor (1943–2007)

- Born: 17 August 1943
- Died: 30 July 2007 (aged 63)
- Occupations: Newspaper editor, journalist
- Spouse: Penny Scragg (1970–his death)
- Children: Three

Richard Keith Stott (17 August 1943 – 30 July 2007) was a British journalist and editor.

Born in Oxford, he attended Clifton College in Bristol. He began his career in journalism with the Bucks Herald, aged 19. After the Great Train Robbery that year, he was the only journalist to interview the driver of the train that pulled the hijacked one off the main line. As a result of this interview, it was realised that the cash haul was a great deal more than had at first been estimated.

Stott is the only man to have edited two British national newspapers twice: the Daily Mirror from 1985 to 1989 and again from 1991 to 1992, and the Sunday People from 1984 to 1985 and again (by then known as The People) from 1990 to 1991. He was one of the few journalists who could call Robert Maxwell's bluff during the time he was editor, and sometimes refused to meet Maxwell's demands. "I considered myself to be working for the Mirror, not for Maxwell", Stott wrote. "I believed in what the Mirror stood for – social justice, decent and honest standards in public life and the right for people with small voices to be heard loud and clear".

Stott's Mirror headline commemorating Maxwell the day after he died ("The Man Who Saved The Mirror") was mocked, but soon afterwards Stott was covering Maxwell's plundering of the company pension funds. After Stott headed a failed management attempt at a buyout, the new chief executive of Mirror Group David Montgomery fired him. At the suggestion of owner Rupert Murdoch, Stott edited the Today newspaper from 1993 to November 1995, when the paper ceased publication. During this time, he appointed Anne Robinson and Alastair Campbell to work for Today. Subsequently, Stott was a columnist for the News of the World (1997–2000) and the Sunday Mirror (2001–7).

Among many interests, he enjoyed buying paintings by modern artists and building a fine collection of books. The younger brother of the actor Judith Stott, his brother-in-law for nearly twenty years was the comedian Dave Allen. Stott's memoir, Dogs and Lampposts, was published in 2002 by Metro.

Stott spent much of his last year editing Alastair Campbell's book The Blair Years. He was married to his wife Penny and had three children. Stott died in London, aged 63, of pancreatic cancer.

Media offices
Preceded by Nicholas Lloyd	Editor of The People; 1984–1985	Succeeded by Ernie Burrington
Preceded by Michael Molloy	Editor of the Daily Mirror; 1985–1989	Succeeded by Roy Greenslade
Preceded by Ernie Burrington	Editor of The People; 1990–1991	Succeeded by Bill Hagerty
Preceded by Roy Greenslade	Editor of the Daily Mirror; 1991–1992	Succeeded by David Banks
Preceded by Martin Dunn	Editor of Today; 1993–1995	Succeeded by Ceased publication
