= Nicholas Lloyd =

British newspaper editor and broadcaster (born 1942)

Sir Nicholas Lloyd
- Born: Nicholas Markley Lloyd; 9 June 1942 (age 83); Luton, Bedfordshire, England
- Education: Bedford Modern School
- Alma mater: St Edmund Hall, Oxford; Harvard University
- Occupations: Newspaper editor, broadcaster
- Spouse: Eve Pollard (m. 1979)
- Children: 4

Sir Nicholas Markley Lloyd (born 9 June 1942) is a British former newspaper editor and broadcaster.

== Early life ==
Nicholas Markley Lloyd was born on 9 June 1942 in Luton, Bedfordshire, the son of Walter and Sybil Lloyd. He was educated at Bedford Modern School, St Edmund Hall, Oxford, and Harvard for the Advanced Management Program.

== Career ==
Lloyd started his career as a reporter at the Daily Mail in 1964. He was made Education Correspondent at The Sunday Times in 1966 and was made its Deputy News Editor in 1968. In 1970 he moved to The Sun where he was made News Editor and, in 1972, became Assistant Editor at the News of the World.

In 1976, Lloyd returned to The Sun where he was made Assistant Editor before joining the Sunday Mirror in 1980 as Deputy Editor. Lloyd edited the Sunday People from 1982 to 1983, then moved to edit the News of the World for a year from 1984, and finally edited the Daily Express from 1986 to 1995.

Lloyd received a knighthood in the 1990 Prime Minister's Resignation Honours. He presented a breakfast show on LBC 97.3, a London radio station, from 1997 to 1999. Since 2010, he has been the chairman of the public relations consultancy BLJ London.

== Family life ==
Lloyd married journalist Eve Pollard in 1979; the couple have a son, Oliver. He also has three children from his previous marriage: Justin, Rachael and James Lloyd. Pollard's daughter from a previous marriage, television presenter Claudia Winkleman, is his step-daughter.

Media offices
Preceded by ?	Deputy Editor of the Sunday Mirror; 1980–1982	Succeeded by ?
Preceded by Geoffrey Pinnington	Editor of the Sunday People; 1982–1983	Succeeded by Richard Stott
Preceded by Derek Jameson	Editor of the News of the World; 1984–1985	Succeeded by David Montgomery
Preceded by Larry Lamb	Editor of the Daily Express; 1986–1995	Succeeded by Richard Addis
