= Tina Weaver =

British journalist

Tina Weaver is a British journalist and former National Newspaper editor.

Weaver began her journalism career at the South West News Service before joining the Sunday People in 1989. During her time there she became Chief Reporter. After a brief period at the Daily Mirror. she moved to the national newspaper Today. In 1994, she was named Reporter of the Year for her investigative reporting of Michael Jackson's relationship with young boys. After Today closed, Weaver returned to the Daily Mirror as Head of Features under editor Piers Morgan. She was promoted to deputy editor in 1998. In 1999 she launched and edited the Mirror''s magazine, M. which quickly received industry recognition, winning Newspaper Supplement of the Year for its 'innovative and highly targeted editorial style'.

In April 2001, Weaver became editor of the Sunday Mirror, becoming one of the most senior women in publishing. During her editorship she oversaw the title through a period of significant change in the British newspaper industry.

Alongside her editorial career, Weaver played a prominent tole in the media industry organisations. She served as Chair of Women In Journalism in 2005, supporting initiatives aimed at increasing the representation and advancement of women in the media. In 2008 she was appointed to the board of the Press Complaints Commission.

Following a restructuring that saw the merger of the Daily & Sunday Mirror editorial operations, Weaver left the company in May 2012. After leaving national newspaper editing, Weaver moved into the charity sector.

In 2013, Weaver was among several former Mirror journalists arrested as part of Operation Weeting, a Metropolitan Police investigation into historical allegations of phone hacking relating to the early 2000s. She strongly denied wrongdoing and after a three-year investigation police concluded there was no evidence to bring charges against her.

Weaver married her long-time partner, former Daily Mirror editor Richard Wallace at Aynhoe Park, Oxon, in June 2016.

In May 2023, during court proceedings involving Mirror Group Newspapers, former Mirror reporter, Dan Evans alleged that Weaver had demonstrated voicemail access techniques to journalists while Weaver was editor of the Sunday Mirror. Weaver has not been charged with any offence.

Media offices
Preceded by Brendon Parsons	Deputy Editor of the Daily Mirror; 1997–2001	Succeeded by Des Kelly
Preceded by Colin Myler	Editor of the Sunday Mirror; 2001–2012	Succeeded by Alison Phillips
