= Colin Myler =

British journalist

Colin Myler is a US-based British journalist.

== Early life ==
Myler grew up in the Hough Green area of Widnes, Cheshire. He was raised Catholic, served as an altar boy and attended SS John Fisher and Thomas More Roman Catholic High School, at the time a secondary modern school, in Widnes.

== Career ==
Myler started his career working for the Catholic Pictorial in Liverpool, before joining West Lancs Press Agency in Southport The Sun and later the Daily Mail. He was appointed news editor of the Sunday People, then moved to Today in 1985, before its launch, again as news editor. He was later appointed as Deputy Editor of the Sunday Mirror.

In 1992, he succeeded his boss Bridget Rowe as editor of the Sunday Mirror. In 1994, he moved to edit the Daily Mirror. He was made managing director of both the Daily and Sunday Mirror in 1995, but soon left to run Super League of Europe, the rugby league marketing body. He returned to the Sunday Mirror in 1998, but resigned in 2001 after Judge David Poole ruled that an article he had published regarding accusations of assault against Leeds United F.C. footballers Lee Bowyer and Jonathan Woodgate risked prejudicing their trial.

Shortly after, Myler moved to the United States and was appointed executive editor of the New York Post. He returned to London in 2007 to become editor of the News of the World and remained in post until the paper ceased publication on 10 July 2011.

On 22 July 2011, Myler and former News of the World lawyer, Tom Crone, wrote to the Parliamentary Select Committee to clarify evidence given by James Murdoch in respect of the News International phone hacking scandal which had resulted in the closure of the News of the World. They appeared before the Committee to answer further questions on 6 September 2011.

In January 2012, Myler was appointed editor-in-chief of the New York City Daily News.

== Personal ==
Myler is a practising Catholic and a second cousin of rugby player Frank Myler.

Media offices
Preceded by Bill Hagerty	Deputy Editor of the Sunday Mirror; 1990–1992	Succeeded by ?
Preceded by Bridget Rowe	Editor of the Sunday Mirror; 1992–1994	Succeeded by Paul Connew
Preceded by David Banks	Editor of the Daily Mirror; 1994–1995	Succeeded by Piers Morgan
Preceded by Brendon Parsons	Editor of the Sunday Mirror; 1998–2001	Succeeded by Tina Weaver
Preceded by Andy Coulson	Editor of the News of the World; 2007–2011	Succeeded by Publication closed
