= Amanda Platell =

Australian journalist

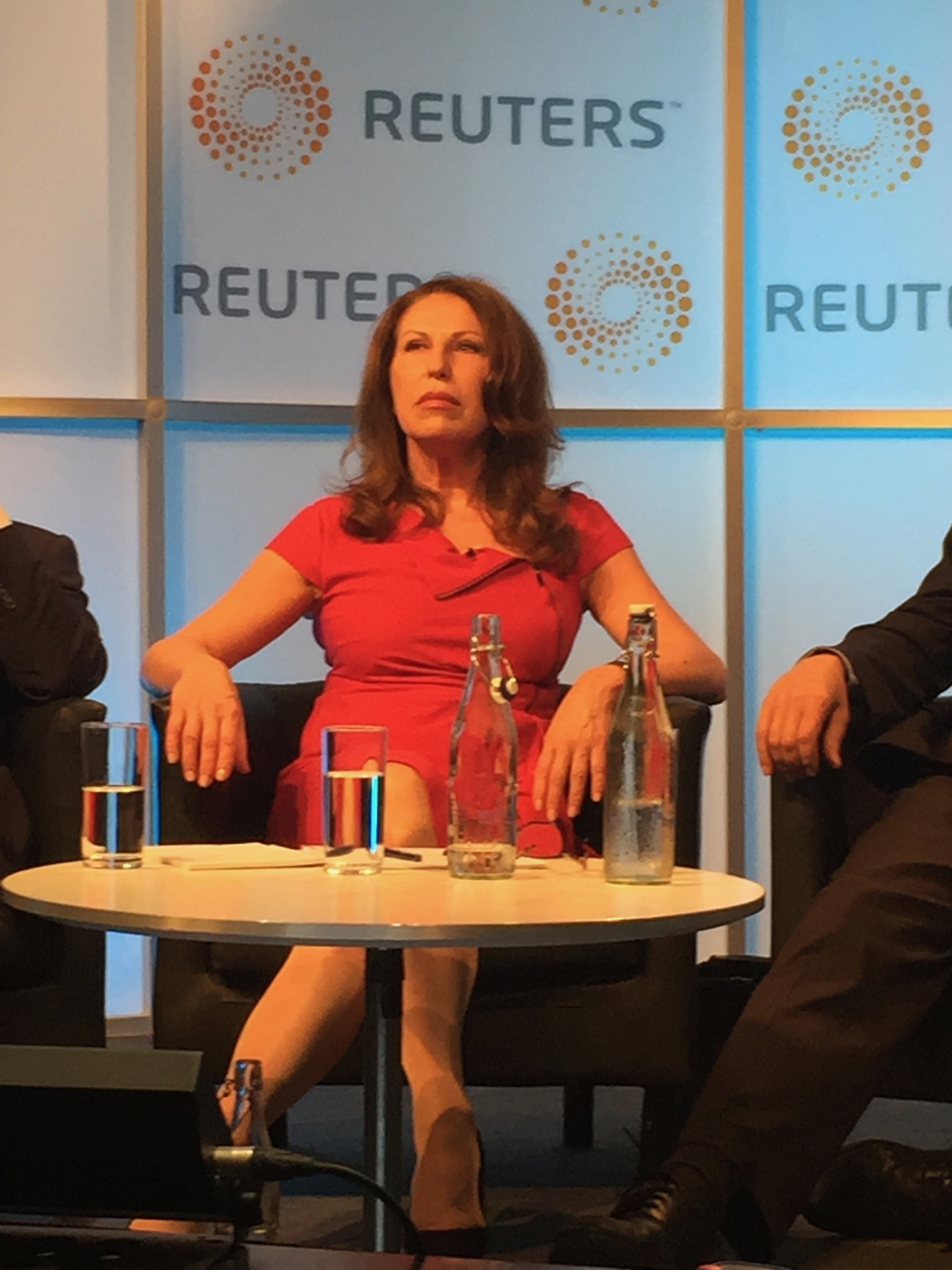
- In 2017 at a London Press Club event
- Born: Amanda Jane Platell; 12 November 1957 (age 69); Perth, Western Australia
- Occupations: Journalist and television presenter
- Spouse: John Chenery (div)

Amanda Jane Platell (born 12 November 1957) is an Australian journalist. Between 1999 and 2001 she was the press secretary to William Hague, the then leader of the British Conservative Party. She is currently based in the UK.

== Early and personal life ==
Platell was born in Perth, Western Australia. Her father was a journalist working for The West Australian newspaper and her mother was a secretary.

Platell graduated with an Honours Degree in Politics and Philosophy from the University of Western Australia.

Her first job was in 1978 when she joined the Perth Daily News.

She has lamented that for medical reasons she has been unable to have children.

== Career ==
After a backpacking tour of the world with her then fiancé John Chenery, she arrived in London in 1985. Aiming to earn enough money to return home she worked as a freelancer for publications including The Observer and the Sunday Express.

After being part of the start-up team of Today, she then joined Robert Maxwell's short-lived London Daily News, before returning under Today editor David Montgomery in 1987 as deputy editor. In 1993 she was appointed managing editor of the Mirror Group, and then moved in the same year to The Independent, initially as marketing director and then managing director.

In 1996 she joined the Sunday Mirror as acting editor, where she was the superior of Labour party's later director of communications, Alastair Campbell. In 1998 she was appointed acting editor of the Sunday Express, a position she was sacked from by Rosie Boycott following the publication of details of Peter Mandelson's gay relationship with his Brazilian partner.

In 1999, Platell published a novel Scandal, about women in the newspaper industry. "Two editors, one paper, may the best woman win" was how the cover summarised the plot.

From 1999 to 2001, Platell moved into politics to become the Conservative Party's head of media, during which she supported William Hague, advising him to just "be yourself" as it was at these times he was his strongest. In her role, Platell made an important contribution to Hague's reversion from a modernising agenda to a 'core vote' strategy pursued during the 1999 European Elections, in which the Conservatives gained the most votes, as well as the 2001 General Election campaign. Hague, however, only managed to make a net gain of 1 seat in 2001, forcing his resignation shortly after the General Election.

Since 2002, Platell has contributed as a freelancer to the Daily Mail. On 21 November 2011, at the Leveson Inquiry into the culture, practice and ethics of the British press, Hugh Grant accused Platell of a "hatchet job" on his recent fatherhood following an article she wrote for the Daily Mail. In 2020 the Daily Mail paid damages of £25,000 to the Cambridge academic Professor Priyamvada Gopal and agreed to pay her legal costs after Platell libellously claimed, citing fake tweets, that she was "attempting to incite an aggressive and potentially violent race war".

== Television ==
- Unspin: Amanda Platell's Secret Video Diary – Channel 4 (2001)
- Morgan & Platell – Channel 4 (2004–2005)
- Prime Ministers Spouses – Channel 4 (2005)
- Crisis Command: Could You Run The Country? – BBC Two (2004)
- Bee in Your Bonnet – BBC Two (2004)
- How Euro Are You? – BBC Two (2005)
- Richard & Judy – Channel 4 (2001–07), regular commentator
- The Daily Politics – BBC Two
- Question Time – BBC One (1993, 2001, 2003, 2004, 2006, 2007, 2008, 2010, 2013 and 2014), panellist
- The Apprentice: You're Fired! – BBC Two (2008, 2009, 2010), guest panellist
- The Andrew Marr Show – BBC One (2005–2021), regular newspaper reviewer
- The Alan Titchmarsh Show – ITV (2007–2014), occasional discussion contributor
- This Morning – ITV (2009–), occasional newspaper reviewer
- Dan Wootton Tonight – GB News (2021–), weekly panellist
- Press Preview – Sky News (2023–), weekly panellist

Media offices
Preceded by Jonathan Holborow	Deputy Editor of Today; 1987–1992	Succeeded by ?
Preceded by Tessa Hilton	Acting Editor of the Sunday Mirror; 1996–1997	Succeeded by Bridget Rowe
Preceded by Richard Addis	Editor of the Sunday Express; 1998–1999	Succeeded by Michael Pilgrim
