= David Banks (journalist) =

British newspaper editor (1948–2022)

Arthur David Banks (13 February 1948 – 22 February 2022) was a British newspaper editor and broadcaster.

== Early life ==
Banks was born in Warrington on 13 February 1948. He attended the local Boteler Grammar School.

== Career ==
Banks worked in journalism through the 1970s, and developed a friendship with Kelvin MacKenzie. By 1979, Banks was assistant chief sub-editor at the Daily Mirror, then went to work with MacKenzie at the New York Post. In 1981, Mackenzie returned to the UK, and Banks became managing editor of the Post, but in 1983 followed MacKenzie back to work at The Sun as assistant editor. He led strikebreakers during the Wapping dispute.

In 1986, Banks returned to New York as editor of the Daily News but, the following year, he moved on to become deputy editor of The Australian, then in 1988 editor of the Sydney Daily Telegraph. In 1992, he returned to the UK to become editor of the Mirror, then in 1994 became editorial director of the Mirror Group, consultant editor of the Sunday Mirror.

Later in the 1990s, Banks presented breakfast shows on LBC and then Talk Radio UK. In the 2000s, he wrote a regular column for the Press Gazette.

== Personal life and death ==
Banks married Gemma Newton in 1975 in Wales. The couple had a daughter (born 1978) and a son (born 1982). Banks died from pneumonia on 22 February 2022, days after his 74th birthday.

Media offices
Preceded by Richard Stott	Editor of the Daily Mirror; 1992–1994	Succeeded by Colin Myler
