= Fenchurch =

Fenchurch could refer to:

- Fenchurch Street, a street in the city of London
  - Fenchurch Street railway station, a railway station on that street
- Fenchurch (clothing), a clothing brand named after the railway station
- Fenchurch, one of the oldest working locomotives, built by William Stroudley and painted in his Improved Engine Green

== Fictional entities ==
- Fenchurch CID, a fictional police department in the British TV series Ashes to Ashes
- Fenchurch St Paul, a fictional village in which the novel The Nine Tailors by Dorothy L. Sayers is mainly set
- Fenchurch (The Hitchhiker's Guide to the Galaxy), a character from The Hitchhiker's Guide to the Galaxy, named after the Fenchurch Street railway station
