= Bill Hagerty (journalist) =

British journalist and editor (1936–2025)

William John Gell Hagerty (23 April 1939 – 26 December 2025) was a British newspaper editor and the chairman emeritus of British Journalism Review.

== Life and career ==
Born in Ilford, Hagerty attended Beal Grammar School, where he developed an interest in journalism, although his headteacher was dismissive of the idea. Despite this, he entered journalism with local newspapers before joining Reynolds News, soon to become the Sunday Citizen, in 1962. He then moved to the Daily Sketch and then the Mirror group, where he worked for many years that included periods as assistant editor of the Daily Mirror, Sunday Mirror and The People.

Hagerty left the Mirror group in 1985, joining Today as managing editor and, from 1987, editor of Sunday Today. He returned to the Mirror group to become deputy editor of the Sunday Mirror in 1988, then deputy editor and subsequently acting editor of the Daily Mirror in 1990, before becoming editor of The People the following year. This last move was a surprise to Hagerty, who had believed that, already in his fifties, he would not be appointed to the editorship of a major national newspaper.

In 1992, following the death of proprietor Robert Maxwell, Hagerty was among many journalists in the company sacked from their editorial posts and then had a variety of positions, including the theatre and film critic for Today, and subsequently other publications, before becoming theatre critic of The Sun. He was appointed editor of British Journalism Review in 2002, and chairman of the journal a decade later.

Hagerty was interviewed by National Life Stories (C638/13) in 2007 for the Oral History of the British Press collection held by the British Library.

In 2011–12 he was chairman of the Journalists' Charity, of which he remained a trustee, and was a director of the London Press Club. He edited eight volumes of Alastair Campbell's diaries for publication and wrote a centenary history of the Daily Mirror, Read All About It.

In October 2023, he was awarded the Journalist Laureate prize by the London Press Club. It was awarded for his lifetime of work both as a journalist and in his role as an active and passionate ambassador for journalism. He was married to the journalist Liz Vercoe.

Hagerty died on 26 December 2025, at the age of 86.

Media offices
Preceded by Peter McKay	Editor of Sunday Today; 1986–1987	Succeeded by Newspaper closed
Preceded by John Parker	Deputy Editor of the Sunday Mirror; 1988–1990	Succeeded by Colin Myler
Preceded by Phil Walker	Deputy Editor of the Daily Mirror; 1990–1991	Succeeded by Phil Swift
Preceded by Richard Stott	Editor of The People; 1991–1992	Succeeded by Bridget Rowe
Preceded by Geoffrey Goodman	Editor of British Journalism Review; 2002–2012	Succeeded by Kim Fletcher
