= Wendy Henry =

Former British journalist and newspaper editor

Wendy Henry is a former British journalist and newspaper editor.

== Early life ==
Henry was born in Lancashire, England, in 1951, and with her twin sister Sara left their mother's house in St Annes on Sea in the late 1960s to move to Manchester to live with their father, a Jewish market trader. By the age of eighteen, she had become a mother during a short-lived marriage.

In their youth, Henry and her sister were active in the International Socialists. In 1972, she was given an absolute discharge after being accused of attempting to throw a carton of milk at Edward Heath when he visited Salford. Her involvement in radical activism at the University of Manchester was spotted by Brian Whittle, Brian Taylor and Peter Reece, who took her on at the Manchester News Service.

== Career in journalism ==
In 1975, Henry was appointed to a six-month trial with the Daily Mail in Manchester, but was not given a permanent position. "I didn’t dress properly; they thought I was too scruffy," she told a Press Gazette interviewer in 2002. During her early career as a freelance, she did manage to gain a scoop in 1976, an interview with Geraldine Ellis, the daughter of Ruth Ellis, the last woman to be hanged in Britain, which she managed to sell to the News of the World. For three years, she worked as an unattached freelance for the News of the World, then become features editor of Woman. She joined The Sun in 1981 as the newspaper's books reader identifying those suitable for potential serialisation, then assistant editor (features), as the deputy of Roy Greenslade. Unlike most of her colleagues, Henry was inclined to stand up to editor Kelvin MacKenzie. She was the first journalist to report that Princess Margaret was having a relationship with Roddy Llewellyn.

According to Greenslade, during the Falklands War, when she heard that the General Belgrano had been sunk, she joked "Gotcha", which was used by editor Kelvin MacKenzie as a Sun headline. She was suspended for a month in June 1985 on full-pay by MacKenzie, who was aware of Murdoch's displeasure, for her involvement in the fabrication of an interview with the seriously injured Falklands veteran Simon Weston. He had refused to be interviewed by The Sun and publicly complained, a story which was taken up by the rival Daily Mirror.

== Newspaper editor ==
Henry was then promoted to editor of the News of the World's Sunday magazine, before being appointed editor of the newspaper in 1987. She managed to increase the circulation of the News of the World by 400,000, but by means which even MacKenzie was reported to have found excessive. The tabloids were then under official pressure for their excesses. "Sales aren't everything, Wendy", proprietor Rupert Murdoch is reported to have told her. She resigned rather than modify her editorial policy.

In 1988, Henry was appointed by Robert Maxwell as editor of the Sunday People, where she was able to have more input into the leading articles. Whilst there she became known for publishing controversial pictures, including victims of the Sioux City air crash in July 1989, which apparently led to a first warning about her future from Maxwell. It was for publishing a photograph of an ailing Sammy Davis Jr (showing scars he had from his treatment for throat cancer), and another of seven-year-old Prince William urinating in public, both in the issue of 19 November 1989, for which she was sacked. According to Joe Haines, Maxwell could not remember the reason he had sacked Henry, for both photographs or which one of them. However, Maxwell told Hugo Young, that it was the picture of Davis which had led to Henry's sacking. In 1990, she moved to the United States to become editor of The Globe, remaining at the title until 1993.

Although she has been described as the first female Fleet Street editor, she was preceded by Delarivier Manley (1711), Rachel Beer (1891–1904) and Mary Howarth (1903).

== Later career ==
In the mid-1990s, she produced A Current Affair on Fox. She went on to edit the "Spotlight" supplement of the New York Daily News from its launch, and then Successful Slimming before returning to London to launch a British edition. She next worked for Parkhill Publishing alongside Eve Pollard, and spent a year editing Real Homes, during this period circulation increased by 7%.

Henry became Press Officer for Battersea Dogs Home in 1997, and was later secretary to several committees at the centre. In 2002, she began working for them as a full-time dog re-socialiser. In 2004, she joined noSWeat journalism training as a professor of Anecdotes.

Media offices
| Preceded by David Montgomery | Editor of the News of the World; 1987–1988 | Succeeded by Patsy Chapman |
| Preceded by Patsy Chapman | Deputy Editor of The Sun; 1988–1989 | Succeeded by Martin Dunn |
| Preceded by John Blake | Editor of the Sunday People; 1989 | Succeeded by Ernie Burrington |
| Preceded by ? | Editor of The Globe; 1990–1993 | Succeeded by ? |
