= Patrick Chapman (disambiguation) =

Patrick Chapman (born 1968) is an Irish poet, writer and screenwriter.

Patrick or Pat Chapman may also refer to:

- Pat Chapman (food writer) (Patrick Chapman), English food writer, broadcaster and author
- Pat Chapman (footballer) (Patricia Chapman), England women's international footballer

== See also ==
- Patsy Chapman, British newspaper editor
