= Tessa Hilton =

British magazine executive and editor (born 1951)

- Born: February 18, 1951 (age 75)
- Occupations: Journalist and editor

Tessa Hilton (born 18 February 1951) is a British magazine executive and former newspaper editor.

After failing to start a career in acting, Hilton trained as a journalist with the Daily Mirror before becoming a news reporter with the Sunday Mirror. She took several years out of the media when her children were born, but started freelancing articles about parenthood for magazines, then wrote the Great Ormond Street Book of Child Health.

In 1985, Hilton returned to regular employment at Mother magazine, then in 1987 she moved to the Today newspaper. She was promoted to Features Editor and then to Assistant Editor before moving to become editor the "Femail" section of the Daily Mail.

Hilton became Assistant Editor at The Sun in 1994, then Editor of the Sunday Mirror briefly in 1995, before moving to become Deputy Editor of the Daily Express. At the Express, she launched the Saturday magazine, then the Sunday Boulevard magazine. In 1999, she became Editor-at-Large at Woman & Home magazine.

Media offices
Preceded by Paul Connew	Editor of the Sunday Mirror; 1995–1996	Succeeded by Amanda Platell
Preceded by ?	Deputy Editor of the Daily Express; 1996–1998	Succeeded by Chris Blackhurst
