= Robert Clark (businessman) =

British naval officer and businessman

Sir Robert Clark DSC
- Born: 6 January 1924
- Died: 3 January 2013 (aged 88)
- Spouse: Marjorie Lewis
- Military career
- Allegiance: United Kingdom
- Branch: Royal Navy
- Service years: 1942–1946
- Rank: Lieutenant
- Units: Royal Naval Volunteer Reserve; Special Operations Executive
- Conflicts: Second World War: Battle of the Atlantic; Battle of the Mediterranean; Italian Campaign

Sir Robert Anthony Clark DSC (6 January 1924 – 3 January 2013) was a British naval officer and businessman. Clark attended King's College, Cambridge, before leaving at the age of 18 to join the Royal Naval Volunteer Reserve during the Second World War. Discovered to be colour blind he was relegated to non-seagoing posts, a prospect he found unappealing. He volunteered for service with the Special Operations Executive and saw active service in Italy, first on amphibious missions and later as a liaison officer with partisans in the Piedmont Mountains. Clark was captured by the Germans, and was later awarded the Distinguished Service Cross for his gallantry.

A chance meeting after the war led to a position at the law firm of Slaughter & May, where he was soon made a partner. He switched career to become a merchant banker with Hill Samuel, where he developed an expertise in company mergers and acquisitions. Clark acted as chairman or director for numerous firms and sat on many governments bodies and committees. Clark met Robert Maxwell in 1969 when Maxwell attempted to outbid Rupert Murdoch for the News of the World, starting a lifelong acquaintance. He led Hill Samuel through their takeover by TSB before Maxwell brought him on as a non-executive director at his Mirror Group of media companies.

Clark became embroiled in the scandal at the Mirror Group that unfolded after Maxwell's death in 1991. Clark claimed to be ignorant of Maxwell's £492 million defrauding of the company and its pension scheme, and faced a non-confidence vote by the shareholders. He survived to be made chairman of the group and to rebuild it after the scandal.

== Early life ==
Bob Clark was born on 6 January 1924 in Finchley, London. His parents were Gladys and Jack Clark, his father being a mechanical engineer who was once apprenticed to Sir Charles Parsons. Clark attended Highgate School in London and was evacuated with the school to Westward Ho! in Devon on the outbreak of the Second World War. Clark was a keen football player and was captain of the Highgate team as well as being head boy of the school. He went up to King's College, Cambridge, to study modern languages. Whilst there he gained a blue in football, the first from the college in 20 years, and played against their rivals at Oxford University.

== Navy career ==
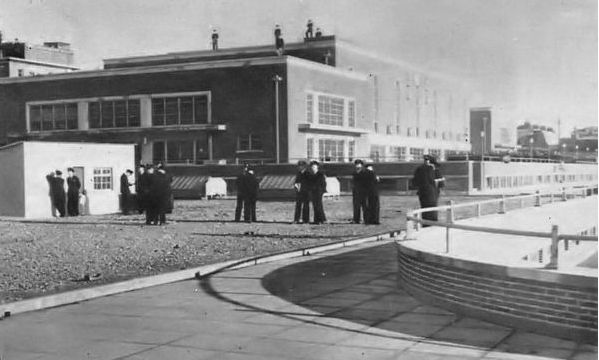
HMS King Alfred, where Clark trained as a naval officer

Clark left Cambridge at the age of 18 to join the Royal Naval Volunteer Reserve as an officer. During initial training at HMS Collingwood, near Portsmouth, Clark discovered that he was colour blind and only passed the medical examination by persuading the man sitting behind him to whisper the answers to him. Clark served aboard HMS Fleetwood on convoy escort operations in the Atlantic and Mediterranean before attending HMS King Alfred at Hove. Whilst there his colour blindness was discovered and he was banned from seagoing postings.

Frustrated at not being able to fight the enemy directly, Clark volunteered for service with the Special Operations Executive (SOE), an irregular warfare unit, in June 1943, having claimed to have had experience working with small boats. He undertook commando training at Arisaig in the Scottish Highlands and further SOE training at Helford in Cornwall. After completing his training, Clark was dispatched to Algeria in September 1943 and thence to Monopoli in south-east Italy in December. He was attached to the SOE's No 1 Special Force and undertook amphibious sabotage, reconnaissance operations and running of agents into enemy-held beaches by canoe. His wireless operator for these missions was Marjorie Lewis, his future wife, who had joined the First Aid Nursing Yeomanry (FANY; often used as a cover for women who joined SOE) in 1943. On 1 March 1944 Clark, who had previously only held the acting rank of sub-lieutenant, was confirmed in a substantive (though temporary) rank.

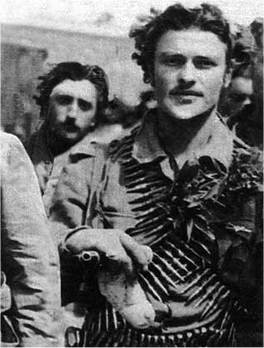
Italian partisans of the Second World War

Clark volunteered for parachute training with SOE and was subsequently allocated to Operation Clarion, the designation for British assistance provided to anti-German partisans in northern Italy. He parachuted into the Piedmont Mountains, south of Turin, in November 1944 with a radio operator, Petty Officer Edward Cauvain, to act as liaison officer to the partisans there. When Clark made his parachute jump he had Falla, his childhood teddy bear, inside his battledress for comfort and good luck. Despite this, he landed 50 miles (80 km) off course and into a tree, breaking two ribs. Clark was rescued by a local partisan, Sergio Curetti of the 3rd Division of Italian partisans.

Clark set about arming the resistance and training them in methods of warfare. He had been instructed to avoid arming the communists where possible, his superiors fearing for their actions after the war, but finding the communists to be the most organised and well-motivated group in his area proceeded to arm them anyway. He arranged an air drop of arms and explosives, and led the partisans on several railway sabotage expeditions. Clark later recalled that "blowing up railway engines was very great fun". For his work with the partisans he was awarded the Distinguished Service Cross, the third-highest award for gallantry in the Royal Navy. Clark was betrayed and captured by a German patrol in December 1944 whilst trying to hide in a haystack with four partisans.

Clark managed to avoid summary execution at the hands of the Germans and was held in several Italian prisons where he was interrogated frequently. He was later transferred to the Marlag und Milag Nord prisoner of war camp near Bremen. Marjorie Lewis did not know that Clark was still alive until he sent her an uncoded message, strictly against standing SOE orders, reading "Bob sends love to Marjorie". After the camp was liberated Clark returned to London, sending ahead a telegram to Marjorie, stating: "Arriving London from Germany. Meet me". They met and the two shook hands; they were later married in 1949. Clark's teddy bear Falla, which he had had since the age of two, had accompanied him throughout his time as a prisoner and is thought to be the only teddy bear to have parachuted behind enemy lines and survived as a prisoner of war. Clark served in the Pacific Theatre and was promoted to lieutenant on 1 March 1946 before he was demobilised later that year.

== Post-war ==
Clark intended to move to Sudan after the war but a chance meeting with his old commanding officer, Hilary Scott, in St James's led to him being offered a position as a clerk at the law firm of Slaughter & May. Clark later said of the meeting: "I knew nothing about the law, but I accepted. And luck worked." He proved to be skilled at arranging mergers of companies and within six years of joining the firm was made a partner, at the age of 29 years. At Slaughter & May, Clark worked exclusively for the firm's merchant bank clients and was involved in the bitter takeover of Millspaugh by Hadfield. In 1957 Clark became a director of Marchwiel Holdings, better known as Alfred McAlpine the civil engineering firm, and would remain on their board until 1996.

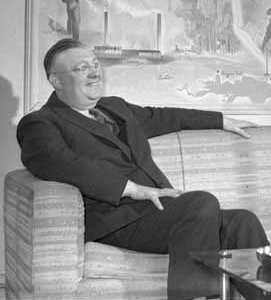
Lord Thompson, to whom Clark helped sell The Times

Through his work Clark became acquainted with the partners of the Philip Hill, Higginson, Erlanders merchant bank (later known as Hill Samuel), one of the two largest in the country. The three men were all over 6 feet 4 inches (1.93 m) tall, "frightfully clever" and looking for a fourth partner. Clark, a tall man himself, fitted their apparent criteria and in 1961 accepted the fourth partnership at the bank; he retired from his partnership at Slaughter & May on 30 September 1961. At Hill Samuel he headed the issues and mergers department and advised on some of the largest company mergers in British history. Clark handled the General Electric Company plc's takeovers of Associated Electrical Industries and English Electric under Arnold Weinstock, and the expansions of Racal, Beecham Group and Courtaulds. He also worked to win the firm business abroad. In 1967 he acted for the Astor family in the sale of The Times newspaper to Lord Thomson of Fleet. With the parties deadlocked and the final price disputed by £50,000, Clark successfully reached an agreement by flipping a coin. He correctly called the fall and won the Astors the additional £50,000. Clark kept the half-crown he had used as a memento and had it mounted on a silver stand. Clark helped to draft the 1968 City Takeover Code that remains in force and regulates how takeovers are carried out in British companies. He chaired the National Film Finance Corporation from 1969 to 1976 and sat on a committee to represent Rolls-Royce's creditors during the nationalisation process. Clark worked with Robert Maxwell when he attempted to purchase the News of the World in 1969. Maxwell was beaten by his rival, Rupert Murdoch (whom Clark sued for libel during the course of the bid), but became friends with Clark and retained him as banker to his British Printing Corporation.

Clark chaired the government's Industrial Development Advisory Board from 1973 to 1980. In this position he found himself frustrated by Secretary of State for Industry Tony Benn's decision to ignore the board's advice and found workers' co-operative schemes at struggling firms Triumph Engineering and Fisher-Bendix in the early 1970s. Clark decided not to resign but to stay on and try to restrain Benn in the future. Benn bore him no ill-will for this and in 1974 asked him to join the government committee into the future of ailing car-makers Austin and British Leyland. He agreed to take the chair of Leyland in 1976 as a stop-gap measure but ended up holding the post for more than a year before the company, beset with strikes, nationalised and he handed the chair to Michael Edwardes. Clark remained a board member and in 1986 undertook discussions with General Motors in an attempt to get an increased bid for Leyland Vehicles, a bid later stopped by public outcry over the inclusion of the Land Rover name.

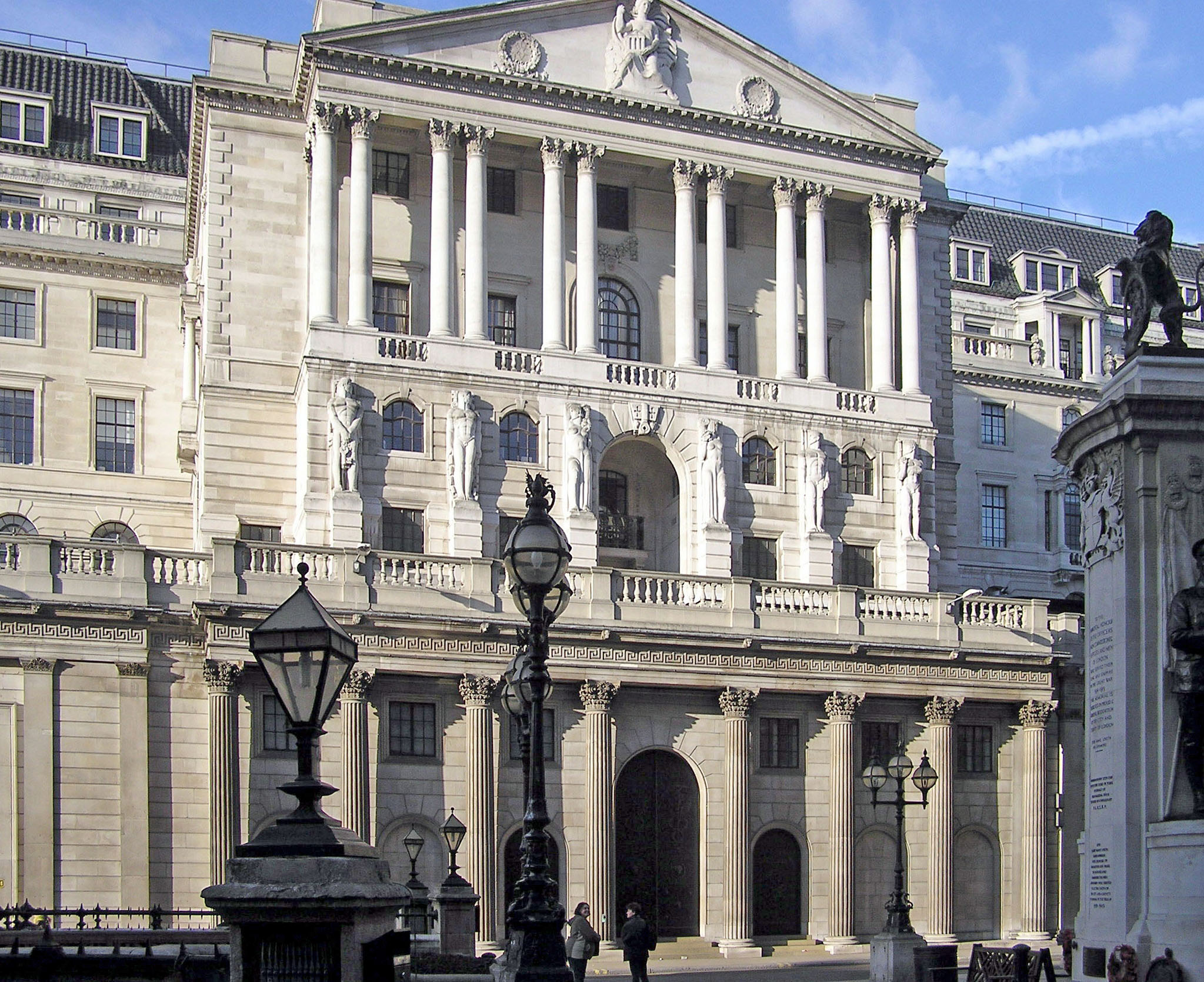
Bank of England headquarters

Clark became chairman of Hill Samuel Bank in 1974, a post he would hold until 1987. He was knighted on 10 February 1976, receiving the honour from the Queen at Buckingham Palace, and became a director of the Bank of England on 4 June, following the death of Sir John Norman Valette Duncan. He was subsequently reappointed director for the four-year terms beginning 1 March 1977 and 1 March 1981.

Clark was appointed chief executive officer of the Hill Samuel holding group in 1976 and was chairman from 1980 to 1988. Clark refused a takeover by Merrill Lynch, but after deregulation in 1986 he was convinced that Hill Samuel was not large enough to compete and, facing hostile takeovers from Kerry Packer and FAI Insurance, arranged takeover talks first with UBS and then with TSB. TSB acquired Hill Samuel in 1988, and Clark became a director in 1987 and then deputy chairman in 1989 for two years. He was on the boards of many other companies, holding directorships at Eagle Star (1976 to 1987) Royal Dutch Shell (1982 to 1994), Vodafone (1988 to 1998), IMI (1981 to 1989) and Marley (1985 to 1989) – he later became the first non-family chairman of the latter. He served on the Review Body on Doctors' and Dentists' Remuneration from 1979 to 1986 and was a trustee of the Charing Cross and Westminster Medical School from 1981 to 1995. In 1982 he received an honorary Doctorate of Science from the Cranfield Institute of Technology. Clark was appointed vice-chairman of pharmaceutical firm SmithKline Beecham in 1987, a post he held for eight years. He was also chairman of the United Drapery Stores, where he was responsible for refusing a takeover bid from Heron Foods before accepting one made by Hanson plc.

== Mirror Group ==
Maxwell bought the Mirror Group in 1986 and floated it in May 1991, appointing Clark to the board of directors. Maxwell claimed that the offer he made Clark would appeal to even a "one-eyed Bulgarian peasant". Clark claimed that he tried to make Maxwell follow conventional business practices and remained convinced that "until quite close to the end, he never did anything I asked him not to do". It was only after Maxwell's unusual death on 5 November 1991 that financial mismanagement of the Mirror Group came to light. There was evidence of 29 unusual payments of £230 million from Mirror to other Maxwell companies within one year in a fraud that eventually cost the company, and its pension fund, £492 million. Clark claimed that there had been no evidence for the directors to act on against Maxwell, telling the shareholders at an extraordinary general meeting (EGM) that "No system of internal control, however elaborate, can stop fraudulent collusion by a group of individuals holding authority and trust. None of us [directors] would have taken on the job had we thought Maxwell was a crook. How many can stand up and say: 'We said he was a crook a year ago'?" Clark's position was disputed by the Department of Trade and Industry, which determined that the two non-executive directors, Clark and Alan Clements, should have questioned the payments. At the EGM Clark almost lost his usual polite nature when he was accused of being a Maxwell "crony" by Rupert Allason and had to rule a no-confidence vote as out of order.

The liquidators of the Mirror asked him to stay on to clean up the company, and he was made chairman and Clements became deputy chairman. Clark brought in David Montgomery as chief executive officer and Lord Hollick as a director to rebuild the company. Hollick remained for just five months before he fell out with Clark, who said: "He mistook politeness for weakness. It is always a big mistake."

Clark eventually stabilised the company and left as chairman in 1998. He co-founded the RP&C International (Rauscher Pierce & Clark) investment bank in 1993 and remained a director until his death. He raised enough for a 25% stake and partnered with a Texas bank to provide the rest. Clark was also deputy chairman of Fenchurch from 1992 to 1995 and remained on its board until 1998. He chaired insurance broker Lownes Lambertin, formerly part of Hill Samuel, in 1995.

== Personal life ==
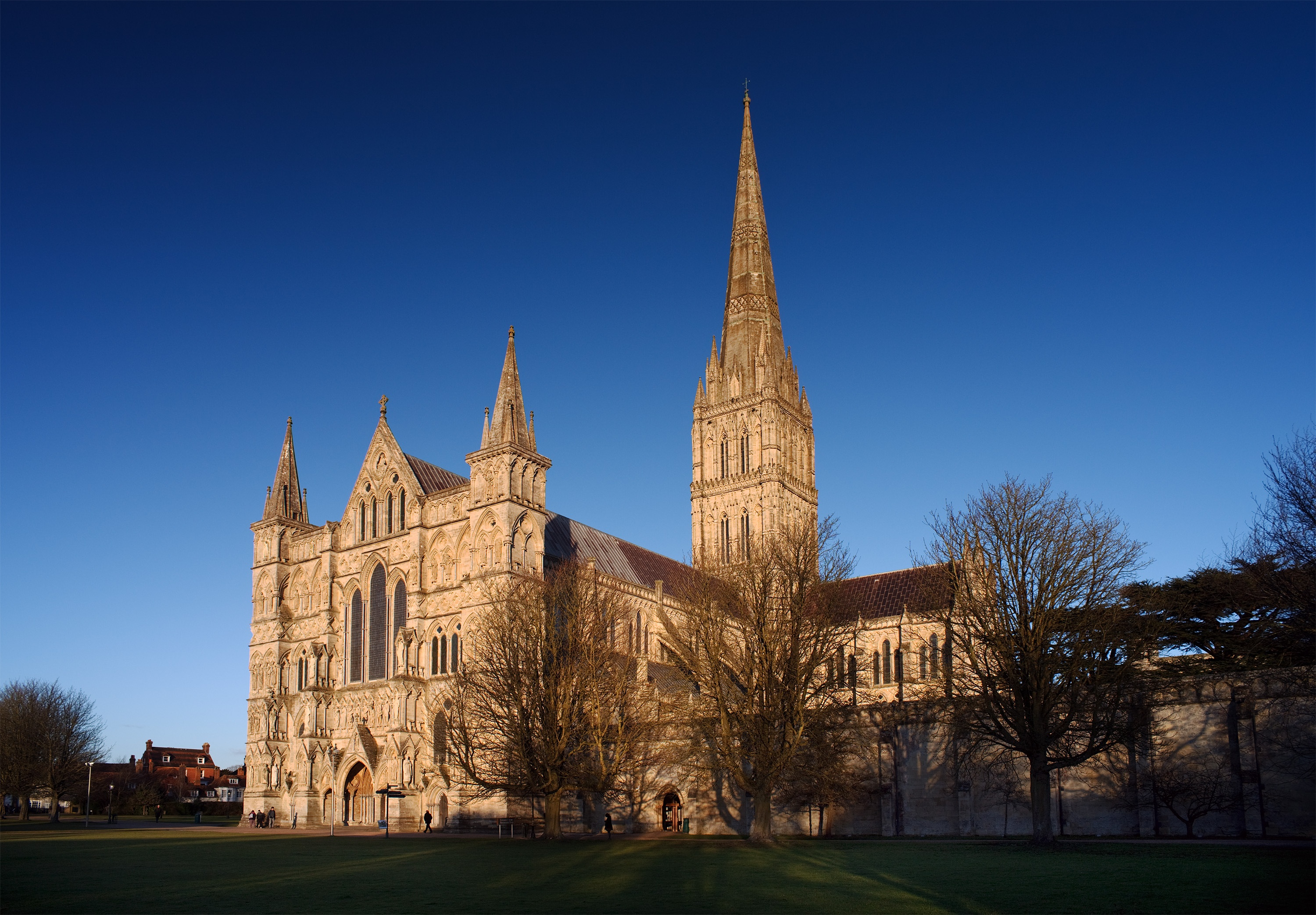
Clark was on the board of the Salisbury Cathedral spire appeal

Clark and his family lived for almost 50 years at a house in Surrey, the former home of horticulturist Gertrude Jekyll, that had been designed by Edwin Lutyens and which Clark described as "the best investment I ever made". Clark was a keen antiquarian, collecting old books and keeping a record of each one that he read. He maintained an interest in sport as well as the opera, having acted as director of the English National Opera from 1983 to 1987. He collected teddy bears, having more than 300 in total (including Falla), and was also interested in the life of Captain Cook, retracing one of his voyages himself. Clark was vice-chairman of the Salisbury Cathedral spire appeal. He was contacted in 1991 by Curetti, the Italian partisan who first helped him out of a tree in the war, and the pair visited each other regularly thereafter. Clark died on 3 January 2013. His son told listeners to BBC Radio4's Saturday Live that his father was cremated with Falla, his Teddy.
