= Ernie Burrington =

British newspaper editor

Ernest Burrington (13 December 1926 – 23 March 2018) was a British newspaper editor, who resided at Dene Park in Kent.

Burrington began his journalistic career in 1941, at the Oldham Chronicle. He served in the Army from 1944 to 1947, before returning to the Oldham Chronicle, then moving into sub-editing, this taking him to the Bristol Evening World and then the Daily Herald. He remained with the paper as it became The Sun, but moved to the Daily Mirror as assistant editor in 1970, then to the Sunday People as deputy editor in 1971, associate editor the following year, and finally editor from 1985 to 1988, and again for a year from 1989. He subsequently held numerous posts within the Mirror group, then later worked for Atlantic Media.

Media offices
Preceded by ?	Deputy Editor of the Sunday People; 1971	Succeeded by Alan Jenkins
Preceded by Richard Stott	Editor of the Sunday People; 1985–1988	Succeeded by John Blake
Preceded by Wendy Henry	Editor of the Sunday People; 1989–1990	Succeeded by Richard Stott
Preceded by Ian Maxwell	Chairman of Mirror Group Newspapers; 1991-1992	Succeeded by Sir Robert Clark
