= The Insider: The Private Diaries of a Scandalous Decade =

Book by Piers Morgan

- Author: Piers Morgan
- Language: English
- Publisher: Ebury Press
- Publication date: 2005
- Pages: 484
- ISBN: 0-09-190506-0

The Insider: The Private Diaries of a Scandalous Decade is a book written in diary form by Piers Morgan documenting his time as editor of the News of the World and Daily Mirror. It was serialised by the Daily Mail.

Although the book is presented as a diary, many reviewers expressed scepticism that the diaries were actually composed during Morgan's tenure as a tabloid editor. Andrew Anthony of The Observer noted the use of the phrase "axis of evil" in an entry two months prior to its use by George W. Bush in his 2002 State of the Union address. The phrase was removed from the subsequent paperback version. Most reviewers were of the opinion that the book was written after the fact at the suggestion of his literary agent and is, consequently, of little use to historians. Sam Leith of The Spectator called the conversations, in particular, "imaginatively reconstructed – as betrayed in some very weird dialogue". David Smith of The Observer felt that the book's contents should "never...be swallowed without a spoonful of salt".

The Insider begins with an account of the story that ultimately resulted his dismissal from Daily Mirror, namely the publication, in 2004, of several photographs purporting to show the abuse of Iraqi prisoners by British troops but which were subsequently found to have been faked. Morgan also recounts a commiseratory dinner marking the paper's decision which was hosted by the Prime Minister and his wife at which Morgan was a guest. Other entries include an account of the theft of text from fellow News International paper, The Sunday Times, by Rebekah Wade and Morgan's later attempted theft of a leaked copy of the Hutton Report that was in the possession of Ms Wade. There are also accounts of various vendettas and feuds with which Morgan was involved. Andy McSmith in The Independent felt that the entries concerning Rupert Murdoch and the functioning of his media empire were "some of the best passages in the book". Andy McSmith notes that Morgan "he does not spare himself or indulge in pointless self-justification" with regard to the mistakes that he made during his tenure as a tabloid editor, a view which was shared by Greg Dyke writing in The Guardian.

In his Guardian review, Dyke said that the lack of detail about Morgan's own private life, particularly with regard to his family set-up, is a limitation of the book. Sam Leith of The Spectator similarly lamented the absence of information concerning Marina Hyde, a journalist with whom Morgan is rumoured to have had an affair. Leith regards David Yelland's firing of Hyde from The Sun to be an important part of Morgan's subsequent feud with the editor. Hyde is thanked in the acknowledgments of the book for her proof reading and companionship.

The Insider was well received by critics. Sam Leith of The Spectator called the stories "funny as hell and as morally discriminating as a rutting polecat". Andy McSmith called it "grippingly readable", while Andrew Anthony in The Observer said it was "cheerfully vitriolic". Sam Leith of The Spectator said of the book, "His memoir is historically negligible, analytically null, morally rudderless, sloppily edited, hopelessly written, boastful, whining, sentimental, thuggish and with all the fascination of a horrible accident. Just like a red-top newspaper on a good day."

An entry detailing the method alleged to have used by journalists at News of the World to hack into the phones of unsuspecting victims was quoted by the MP Louise Mensch during the questioning of Rupert and James Murdoch by the Culture, Media and Sport Select Committee in 2011. Ms Mensch then stated that Piers Morgan had not only engaged in phone hacking but had boasted that it had won him an award. Bloomberg Businessweek suggested that Mensch had "confuse[d] her source". Adding that the passage referred to Morgan's fear of having been hacked. Piers Morgan asked for Mensch to retract her comments calling them an "absolute, blatant lie". He further stated that "in my time at the News of the World and the Mirror, I have never hacked a phone, told anyone to hack a phone, or published any stories based on the hacking of a phone". After initially refusing, Mensch subsequently apologised saying that she had misread a newspaper article published in the Daily Telegraph which covered similar accusations against Morgan made by the political blogger Paul Staines.
