= Paul Connew =

British former newspaper editor

Paul Norman Connew was a British former newspaper editor.

Born in Coventry, Connew attended King Henry VIII Grammar School, an independent school in the city, followed by the LSE. He entered journalism working for the Coventry Express, then moved to the Coventry Evening Telegraph. He later moved to London to work for the Daily Mirror and was the Mirror Group's US Bureau chief until joining the Murdoch organisation in the US before returning to London. He became Deputy Editor of the News of the World before returning to the Mirror as Deputy Editor. He edited the Sunday Mirror for a short period starting in 1994, and subsequently worked as a consultant for Express Newspapers and Talksport.

Connew was formerly married to television presenter Lowri Turner during which period he became a house husband, but the couple, who have two sons, separated after 10 years in 2002, and divorced in 2004. Connew subsequently worked as Director of Communications for the Sparks charity, and as a judge for the British Press Awards.

Paul Connew died on 3 July 2026 aged 79.

Media offices
Preceded by Martin Dunn and Phil Wrack	Deputy Editor of the News of the World; 1989–1994	Succeeded by Phil Hall
Preceded by ?	Deputy Editor of the Daily Mirror; 1994	Succeeded by Brendon Parsons?
Preceded by Colin Myler	Editor of the Sunday Mirror; 1994–1995	Succeeded by Tessa Hilton
Preceded by Rebekah Wade	Deputy Editor of the News of the World? 1998–2000	Succeeded by Andy Coulson
