= Gavin Hewitt =

British journalist and presenter (born 1951)

Gavin Hewitt (born 1951, Penge, London) is a British journalist and presenter, currently BBC News's News Editor. He was formerly its Europe Editor, a post he held between September 2009 to the autumn of 2014, and became News Editor to cover a wider brief.

== Early life and education ==
Son of Rev. Thomas Hewitt (died 1964), of Worthing, West Sussex, and Daffodil Anne (died 2007), née Thorne, Hewitt was educated at the independent school St John's School in Leatherhead, Surrey and St John's College, University of Durham where he reported for a live student programme on BBC Radio Durham entitled University Termtime. His sister, Anne, married Rev. Anthony Proctor-Beauchamp, son of Sir Ivor Proctor-Beauchamp, 8th Baronet. His brother is Garth Hewitt, the singer-songwriter, Anglican priest and social justice advocate.

== Career ==
Prior to his work at the BBC, Hewitt lived in Toronto and worked as a correspondent for the Canadian Broadcasting Corporation.

Hewitt joined the BBC's Panorama as a presenter in 1984 and was in East Berlin when the Berlin Wall came down. He conducted the first British television interview with Oliver North after the Iran Contra scandal, and later wrote a book about the hostage crisis in the Lebanon. While working at Panorama, Hewitt made "The Case Of India One" which led to an investigation into police corruption. He also made the film "Escape From Tiananmen", which broke the story of Operation Yellow Bird - the underground network used to smuggle student leaders and others out of China.

He has been the BBC's Washington Correspondent on several occasions, and has made three films about President Bill Clinton, including All The President's Women, and The Shaming Of The President. In 2003 he was one of three reporters to use David Kelly as a source for the BBC story claiming that the British Government had "sexed up" a dossier describing Iraq's weapons of mass destruction. He later gave evidence on the affair to the Hutton Inquiry.

In 2008 Hewitt covered the United States Presidential Election primaries and Democratic Nominee for President Barack Obama's visit to the Middle East and Europe in the summer of 2008. Hewitt also covered Barack Obama's campaign for President during the autumn of that year, broadcasting from Grant Park when Obama was elected the first African American President of the United States on Tuesday 4 November 2008 working with Senior Producer Ian Sherwood and Picture Correspondent Rob Magee He then also covered Obama's Inauguration on 20 January 2009.

During the War in Georgia in August 2008 Hewitt, senior producer Ian Sherwood and picture correspondent Rob Magee came under fire from a Russian fighter plane whilst covering the War on the front line.

== Awards ==
Hewitt won the Royal Television Society Award in 2001 for his coverage of the Oldham riots and also won the Broadcast Award for "England's Shame", an investigation into football hooliganism at Euro 2000. His report on the Madrid bombings also won a Bafta award..

== Other work ==
In 1997 Hewitt wrote and presented the BBC One tribute to Princess Diana and in 1998 made Charles: A Life in Waiting - a portrait of Prince Charles at 50 for Panorama and the US Arts and Entertainment channel. He has also worked for the BBC's Natural History Unit making two programmes about the Land Of The Tiger, and wrote and presented Another Silent Spring about the effect of pesticides on wildlife.

In 2004 he presented Crisis Command - Could you run the country? - a BBC TV show where three people are given the chance to take ministerial decisions in a real-time dramatisation of a potential national emergency (flooding, terrorist attack etc.). He has written A Soul on Ice - a book about his time as a journalist.

Media offices
| Preceded by Mark Mardell | Europe Editor: BBC News; 2009-2014 | Succeeded by Katya Adler |
| Preceded by New position | Global News Editor: BBC News; 2014- | Succeeded by Incumbent |
