= Bridget Rowe =

British newspaper editor (1950–2021)

Bridget Rowe (16 March 1950 – 12 January 2021) was a British newspaper editor.

== Life and career ==
Rowe worked for a succession of magazines: 19, Petticoat, Club, Look Now and Woman's World, before becoming Assistant Editor of The Sun, then editor of "Sunday", the News of the World's magazine. In 1986, Rowe became editor of Woman's Own, then left to become editor of TV Times.

Rowe edited the Sunday Mirror from 1991 to 1992, then moved to edit The People. In 1993 The People published a photo of Sonia Sutcliffe taken by a freelance photographer that breached Press Complaints Commission code of conduct on privacy. Her refusal to accept respsponsibility for the actions of the photographer was described by the PCC as "lamentable".

In 1995, she became managing director of both newspapers, and in 1997 she returned to editing the Sunday Mirror for a year. After this she served as the Director of Communications for the National Magazine Company, and later was the content director of Yava until it closed in 2001. She was a panelist on the first series of Loose Women in 1999.

A friend of UK Independence Party (UKIP) leader Nigel Farage, Rowe registered as the leader of Libertas UK with the United Kingdom Electoral Commission in December 2008, in order to prevent Declan Ganley's political party Libertas from fielding candidates in the UK's European Parliament elections in 2009 under that name. Rowe worked as public relations chief for the businessman and UKIP donor Arron Banks.

Rowe died from COVID-19 in Farnborough on 12 January 2021, at the age of 70, during the COVID-19 pandemic in the United Kingdom.

Media offices
Preceded by Eve Pollard	Editor of the Sunday Mirror; 1991–1992	Succeeded by Colin Myler
Preceded by Bill Hagerty	Editor of The People; 1992–1996	Succeeded by Len Gould
Preceded by Amanda Platell	Editor of the Sunday Mirror; 1997–1998	Succeeded by Brendon Parsons
