= Patric Walker =

British writer of astrology columns

- Born: Patric William Walker; 25 September 1931; Hackensack, New Jersey, United States
- Died: 8 October 1995 (aged 64)
- Occupation: Astrologer
- Years active: 1965—1995
- Partner: Martyn Thomas

Patric William Walker (25 September 1931 – 8 October 1995) was an American-born, British astrologer. Walker's columns, famed for their literary style, appeared in numerous publications throughout the world, leading to claims that he had a readership of one billion.

Raised in Whitby, England, Walker did his national service with the Royal Air Force before working as an accountant and a property developer, among other jobs. A chance meeting at a dinner party led to Walker learning astrology from Helene Hoskins. Hoskins later recommended Walker to Nova, for whom he worked as an astrologer from the magazine's launch in March 1965 until taking over Hoskins' 'Celeste' column in Harpers & Queen in 1974. He later moved to the Daily Mirror then, in 1976, to Associated Newspapers, for whom he wrote astrology columns in the Evening Standard and The Mail on Sunday until the 1990s.

Walker enjoyed the London social scene of the 1970s and counted Elton John and The Beatles as friends, but grew tired of partying and fame and moved to Lindos on the Greek island of Rhodes in 1982, while maintaining an apartment in London. Having left The Mail on Sunday in 1992, Walker fell ill and died of food poisoning in his London apartment in October 1995. He remained a bachelor and had no children. Walker was succeeded at the Evening Standard by Shelley von Strunckel, who he had mentored.

== Early life ==
Patric Walker was born on 25 September 1931 in Hackensack, New Jersey, United States to British parents, who had emigrated from Yorkshire, England. The family returned to Yorkshire when Walker was four, settling in Whitby. Walker's mother died when he was seven, an event about which he later said "nothing could ever happen to me in life that would be greater than that loss." His father married again and had three children with his second wife. Walker attended Whitby Grammar School, before performing national service with the Royal Air Force, where he was posted to India and Pakistan and learned accountancy.

== Career ==
Walker moved to London and tried various careers, including accountancy, a short spell at ICI, running a club in Pimlico, being a waiter and bartender and a property developer, the lattermost after being gifted winnings his aunt made on a sweepstake. It was only after meeting American astrologer Helene Hoskins (who would later write as Celeste in Harpers & Queen) at a dinner party around the end of the 1950s/start of the 1960s that Walker turned to astrology, with Hoskins enlisting Walker as her apprentice. Walker subsequently began writing an astrology column under the name Novalis for glossy women's magazine Nova on its launch in March 1965 after a recommendation from Hoskins, who would later say of Walker "I knew [he] would be good, but not this good".

In 1974 Walker took over Hoskins' 'Celeste' column in Harpers & Queen before moving to The Daily Mirror then, in 1976, to Associated Newspapers, for whom he wrote columns in the Evening Standard and The Mail on Sunday as Celeste, using his own name from 1991. He produced four astrology supplements a year for The Mail on Sunday, with the release of each supplement raising the paper's circulation by a quarter of a million copies for the issue they were contained in, before leaving in 1992 to be replaced by Jonathan Cainer. He was reported to have earned over £500,000 for his Evening Standard column. A daily column written by Walker appeared in over 100 American and Canadian newspapers, including The New York Times, with a weekly column appearing in the TV Guide and a monthly column in Mirabella magazine.

Walker's columns were also syndicated in South America, the Middle East and Asia and he was responsible for a number of astrological phone-lines, which users could ring at the rate of 49p per minute, as well as writing The Patric Walker Birthday Book for children, with profits going to the National Society for the Prevention of Cruelty to Children. His readership was estimated to be one billion worldwide. Walker acted as a mentor to Shelley von Strunckel, who covered for Walker when he fell ill in 1991 and took over the astrology column in Walker's old newspaper, the Evening Standard, in December 1995. Walker was a pioneer of the 900 number phone business in the U.S. partnering with News America, a subsidiary of News Corp., to provide his popular extended weekly horoscopes through numerous magazines and newspapers across the country.

Writing for The New York Times, William Grimes described Walker's horoscope columns as having "a literary sense and an urbane outlook on life rare for the genre". He has also been described as "the world's greatest astrologer" and, by Justine Picardie writing for The Independent, as "the Henry James of horoscope writers [...] the man who'd made the trade respectable". Walker denied having any special astrological abilities, stating that "even if one has them, I don't think it's something one should be aware of. Whatever these personal gifts are, they are not to be exploited or boasted about".

== Personal life ==
Walker was active in the London social scene in the 1970s, wearing expensive clothes and jewellery and counting Elton John and The Beatles, whom he became acquainted with when they were beginning their careers in the early 1960s, as friends. He grew tired of partying and fame however, stating that it was "extremely hard to be perceived as someone who is always right [...] I was expected to be infallible, and it made me start drinking", and moved to Lindos on the Greek island of Rhodes in 1982 after falling in love with the village during a visit in 1979. Walker spent much of the year in Lindos, where he wrote his astrology columns, and also maintained a property in London. As part of his 1992 television travel series, Pole to Pole, Michael Palin visited Walker at his Lindos home.

Because the hospital his mother attended in Hackensack did not record the time of his birth, Walker was unable to produce his own horoscope.

== Death ==
Walker died of food poisoning in his London apartment on 8 October 1995. His two sisters and his brother were present at his death. Walker remained a bachelor and was not survived by any children.

== Bibliography ==
- "Patric Walker, Astrologer with Worldwide Following, Dies at 64". Associated Press. 10 October 1995. Archived from the original on 21 October 2020.
- Brompton, Sally (10 October 1995). "Obituaries: Patric Walker". The Independent. Archived from the original on 23 April 2018.
- Byrne, Ciar (11 January 2004). "Stars in their editors' eyes". The Guardian. Archived from the original on 1 January 2016.
- "Astrologist Patric Walker, 64; Wrote Clever Daily Horoscopes". Chicago Tribune. 14 October 1995.
- "Jonathan Cainer: Millionaire astrologer whose predictions were read by 12 million people". The Times. 6 May 2016.
- Grimes, William (10 October 1995). "Patric Walker, 64, Astrologer With an International Following". The New York Times. Archived from the original on 29 December 2017.
- Hillman, David (1993). Nova 1965-1975. Pavilion Books.
- McIntosh, Fiona (25 September 2002). "Meet our new star astrologer". Evening Standard. Archived from the original on 13 October 2015.
- Palin, Michael (1992). Pole to Pole. BBC Books.
- Picardie, Julie (3 December 1995). "Spinning after Patric's Star". Independent on Sunday. Archived from the original on 22 October 2020.
- "Walker, 64, astrologer for millions of readers". Tampa Bay Times. 4 October 2005. Archived from the original on 22 October 2020.
- Walker, Esther (22 October 2005). "Cover girls: 300 years of women's magazines". The Independent. Archived from the original on 28 June 2018.
- Watson, Pam (11 October 1995). "Patric Walker: Signs of His Time". The Guardian. p. 17.
