= Charles Shoebridge =

Writer and broadcaster

Charles Shoebridge (born 1961) is a writer, broadcaster, and Russia Today commentator on security, intelligence, terrorism, and crime issues.

Charles Shoebridge worked in counter-terrorism with the British Army and the Metropolitan Police until he retired in 2000. He ultimately won three separate employment tribunal cases against the Metropolitan Police, the last being for "victimising" him by interfering with his media work.

After retirement he worked as a pundit, making TV, radio and newspaper contributions, including as one of the host presenters of the television series Crisis Command.

Shoebridge repeatedly spoke out about the war in Syria, suggesting that the White Helmets were a UK propaganda unit.
