= Piers Morgan =

English journalist and television host (born 1965)

- Morgan in 2026
- Born: Piers Stefan O'Meara; 30 March 1965 (age 61); Guildford, Surrey, England
- Education: Harlow College
- Occupations: Broadcaster; journalist; writer; media personality
- Years active: 1985–present
- Employers: News of the World (1994–1995); Daily Mirror (1995–2004); First News (2006–2007); CNN (2011–2014); MailOnline (2014–2021); ITV (2007–2021); The Sun (1989–1994, 2022–); TalkTV (2022–2024)
- Spouses: Marion Shalloe (m. 1991; div. 2008) Celia Walden (m. 2010)
- Children: 4
- Relatives: George Walden (father-in-law); Rebecca Loos (second cousin)

Piers Stefan Pughe-Morgan (Note: /pɪərz/) (né O'Meara; born 30 March 1965) is an English broadcaster, journalist, television personality, and writer. He began his career in 1988 at the tabloid The Sun. In 1994, at the age of 29, he was appointed editor of the News of the World by Rupert Murdoch, which made him the youngest editor of a British national newspaper in more than half a century. From 1995 Morgan edited the Daily Mirror, until he was sacked in 2004, for publishing faked photographs of British soldiers inflicting brutality on Iraqi prisoners of war. He was the editorial director of First News from 2006 to 2007. In 2014, he became the first editor-at-large of the MailOnline website's American operation.

As a television presenter, Morgan hosted the ITV talk show Piers Morgan's Life Stories (2009–2020), the CNN talk show Piers Morgan Live (2011–2014), and co-presented the ITV Breakfast programme Good Morning Britain (2015–2021) alongside Susanna Reid. He has been a judge on the television talent shows America's Got Talent (2006–2011) and Britain's Got Talent (2007–2010). In 2008 Morgan won The Celebrity Apprentice, appearing with the future United States president Donald Trump. He was a presenter for TalkTV (now known as Talk), hosting the programme Piers Morgan Uncensored from 2022 to 2024, before leaving the network and moving the programme to YouTube. Since September 2025 a weekly highlights show from YouTube episodes of the show has aired on Channel 5.

Morgan was the editor of the Daily Mirror during the period in which the paper was implicated in the phone hacking scandal. In 2011 Morgan denied having ever hacked a phone and stated that he had not, "to [his] knowledge published any story obtained from the hacking of a phone". The following year, he was criticised in the findings of the Leveson Inquiry by chair Brian Leveson, who stated that comments made in Morgan's testimony about phone hacking were "utterly unpersuasive" and "that he was aware that it was taking place in the press as a whole and that he was sufficiently unembarrassed by what was criminal behaviour that he was prepared to joke about it". Mr Justice Fancourt, the judge in the 2023 court case against Mirror Group Newspapers found truthful evidence that Morgan knew about private phone hacking from a reporter, shared a method of phone hacking with a media professional while being questioned about a reporting scoop, and that Morgan played another's private phone message in the newsroom he had received from another tabloid editor.

Morgan's outspoken views and controversial comments on Good Morning Britain led Ofcom to adjudicate on multiple occasions. In March 2021, Morgan left the programme with immediate effect, following his criticism of the Oprah with Meghan and Harry interview. Ofcom received over 57,000 complaints from viewers, including a complaint from Meghan, Duchess of Sussex, herself; Morgan was subsequently cleared of wrongdoing by Ofcom.

== Early life and education ==
Morgan was born Piers Stefan O'Meara on 30 March 1965 in Guildford, Surrey, the son of Vincent Eamonn O'Meara, an Irish dentist, and Gabrielle Georgina Sybille (née Oliver), an Englishwoman who raised Morgan as a Catholic. A few months after his birth the family moved to Newick, East Sussex. His father died when Morgan was 11 months old; his mother later married Glynne Pughe-Morgan, a Welsh pub landlord who later worked in the meat distribution business, and he took his stepfather's surname. He was educated at the independent fee-paying Cumnor House prep school, between the ages of seven and 13, then Chailey School, a comprehensive secondary school in Chailey, followed by Priory School, Lewes, for sixth form. After nine months at Lloyd's of London, Morgan studied journalism at Harlow College, joining the Surrey and South London Newspaper Group in 1985.

== Press career ==
=== At the Murdoch titles (1988–1995) ===
Morgan began to work as a freelance at The Sun in 1988, at this point dropping his double-barrelled name. He told Hunter Davies in December 1994 that he was personally recruited by the Sun editor Kelvin MacKenzie to work on the newspaper's show business column "Bizarre", his first high-profile post. Although he was not a fan of pop music, he was considered skilled at self-publicity and became the column's main writer. "I became the Friend of the Stars, a rampant egomaniac, pictured all the time with famous people – Madonna, Stallone, Bowie, Paul McCartney, hundreds of them. It was shameless, as they didn't know me from Adam", he told Davies.

During 1993 and 1994 Morgan was the pop group Take That's official biographer, releasing the books Take That: Our Story and Take That: On The Road having exclusive access to document their meteoric rise and impact.

In January 1994 he became editor of the News of the World after being appointed to the job by Rupert Murdoch. Initially an acting editor, he was confirmed in the summer, becoming at 29 the youngest national newspaper editor in more than half a century. In this period, the newspaper led with a series of scoops for which Morgan credited a highly efficient news desk and the publicist Max Clifford.

Morgan left this post in 1995 shortly after publishing photographs of Catherine Victoria Lockwood, then wife of Charles, Earl Spencer, leaving an addictive disorders clinic in Surrey. This action ran against the editors' code of conduct, a misdemeanour for which the Press Complaints Commission upheld a complaint against Morgan. Murdoch was reported as having said that "the boy went too far" and publicly distanced himself from the story. Fearful of a privacy law action if he had not criticised one of his employees, Murdoch is said to have apologised to Morgan in private.

The incident was reported to have contributed to Morgan's decision to leave for the Daily Mirror editorship. Morgan's autobiography The Insider states that he left the News of the World for the Mirror of his own choice. It asserts he was an admirer of the former Conservative prime minister Margaret Thatcher for most of her period of office, making the appointment surprising as the Mirror is a Labour-supporting title.

=== Daily Mirror editor ===
As editor of the Daily Mirror, Morgan apologised on television for the headline (rendered in upper case) "ACHTUNG! SURRENDER; For you, Fritz, ze Euro 96 Championship is over" on 25 June 1996, a day before England met Germany in a semi-final of the UEFA Euro 1996 football championships. The headline was accompanied by an open letter from Morgan parodying Neville Chamberlain's declaration of war on Germany in 1939. "It was intended as a joke, but anyone who was offended by it must have taken it seriously, and to those people I say sorry," he said. Germany won the match and went on to win the championship final at Wembley Stadium, London.

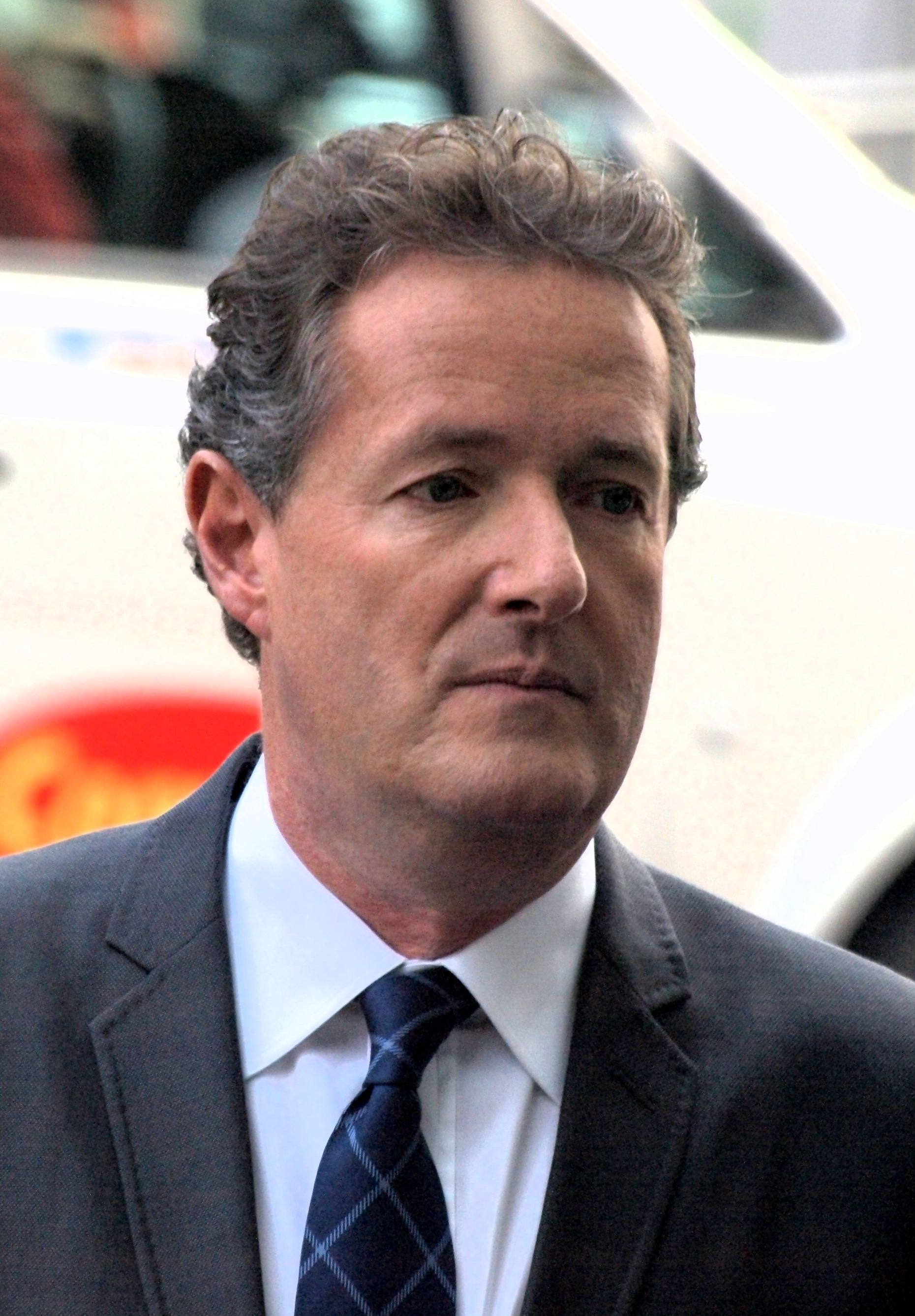
Morgan in 2011

Under Morgan's leadership, the Daily Mirror spent £16 million on a rebranding project, including the dropping of "Daily" from the masthead in February 1997, which was later reversed. Roy Greenslade wrote in August 1999 that Morgan's editorship "has made a huge difference: his enormous enthusiasm, determination and focus is a major plus".

Morgan was the subject of an investigation in 2000 after Suzy Jagger wrote an article for The Daily Telegraph revealing that he had bought £20,000 worth of shares in the computer company Viglen soon before the Mirror's "City Slickers" column tipped Viglen as a good buy. Morgan was found by the Press Complaints Commission to have breached the Code of Conduct on financial journalism, but kept his job. The "City Slickers" columnists, Anil Bhoyrul and James Hipwell, were both found to have committed further breaches of the Code and were sacked before the inquiry concluded. Further enquiry by the Department of Trade and Industry in 2004 cleared Morgan of any charges. On 7 December 2005, Bhoyrul and Hipwell were convicted of conspiracy to breach the Financial Services Act. During the trial it emerged that Morgan had bought £67,000 worth of Viglen shares, emptying his bank account and investing under his (first) wife's name as well.

The Mirror attempted to move mid-market in 2002, eschewing the more trivial stories of show-business and gossip, and appointed Christopher Hitchens as a columnist, but sales declined. In October 2003, journalist and television personality Jeremy Clarkson emptied a glass of water over Morgan during the last flight of Concorde in response to some photographs published in the Mirror. In March 2004, at the British Press Awards, Clarkson punched Morgan three times during another argument. In Campbell v MGN Ltd, the Law Lords in May 2004 found in favour of model Naomi Campbell on privacy grounds after the Mirror had published a photograph of her entering a Narcotics Anonymous clinic. Morgan was critical of the judgement saying it was "a good day for lying, drug-abusing prima donnas who want to have their cake with the media and the right to then shamelessly guzzle with their Cristal champagne."

In the wake of the Abu Ghraib torture scandal, Morgan was sacked as editor of the Daily Mirror "with immediate effect" on 14 May 2004, after refusing to apologise to Sly Bailey, then head of Trinity Mirror, for authorising the newspaper's publication of fake photographs. The photos were alleged to show Iraqi prisoners being abused by British Army soldiers from the Queen's Lancashire Regiment. Within days the photographs were shown to be crude fakes. According to official British sources, the photographs were apparently taken in North-West England. Under the headline "SORRY..WE WERE HOAXED", the Mirror responded that it had fallen victim to a "calculated and malicious hoax" and apologised for the publication of the photographs. However, Morgan refused to admit that the photographs were faked, and stated that the abuse shown in the photographs is similar to the sort of abuse that was happening in the British Army in Iraq at the time.

==== Phone hacking allegations ====
During Morgan's tenure as editor, the Daily Mirror was advised by Steven Nott that voicemail interception was possible by means of a standard PIN code. Despite staff initially expressing enthusiasm for the story it did not appear in the paper, although it did subsequently feature in a South Wales Argus article and on BBC Radio 5 Live in October 1999. On 18 July 2011, Nott was visited by officers of Operation Weeting.

He came under criticism for his "boasting" about phone hacking from Conservative MP Louise Mensch, who has since apologised for these accusations.

In July 2011, in a sequence of articles, political blogger Paul Staines alleged that while editor of the Daily Mirror in 2002 Morgan published a story concerning the affair of Sven-Göran Eriksson and Ulrika Jonsson while knowing it to have been obtained by phone hacking.

On 20 December 2011, Morgan appeared as a witness by satellite link from the United States at the Leveson Inquiry. While he said he had no reason to believe that phone hacking had occurred at the Mirror while he was in charge there, he admitted to hearing a recording of an answerphone message left by Paul McCartney for Heather Mills, but refused to "discuss where that tape was played or who made [it] – it would compromise a source." Appearing as a witness at the same Inquiry on 9 February 2012, Mills was asked under oath if she had ever made a recording of McCartney's phone call or had played it to Morgan; she replied: "Never". She said that she had never authorised Morgan, or anybody, to access or listen to her voicemails. Mills told the inquiry that Morgan, "a man that has written nothing but awful things about me for years", would have relished telling the inquiry if she had played a personal voicemail message to him.

On 23 May 2012, the Newsnight presenter Jeremy Paxman was a witness at the Leveson Inquiry. He recalled a lunch with the Mirror editor in September 2002 at which Morgan outlined the means of hacking [or accessing] a mobile phone voicemail, using the SIM card network's default security code.

On 28 November 2012, the Channel 4 documentary Taking on the Tabloids, fronted by the actor and phone hacking victim Hugh Grant, showed footage from a 2003 interview with Morgan by the singer and phone hacking victim Charlotte Church, during which he explained to her how to avoid answerphone messages being listened to by journalists. He said: "You can access ... voicemails by typing in a number. Now, are you really telling me that journalists aren't going to do that?"

On 29 November 2012 the official findings of the Leveson Inquiry were released, in which Lord Justice Leveson said that Morgan's testimony under oath on phone hacking was "utterly unpersuasive". He stated: "[The] evidence does not establish that [Morgan] authorised the hacking of voicemails or that journalists employed by TMG [Trinity Mirror Group] were indulging in this practice ... What it does, however, clearly prove is that he was aware that it was taking place in the press as a whole and that he was sufficiently unembarrassed by what was criminal behaviour that he was prepared to joke about it."

On 6 December 2013, Morgan was interviewed, under caution, by police officers from Operation Weeting investigating phone hacking allegations at Mirror Group Newspapers during his tenure as editor.

On 24 September 2014, the Trinity Mirror publishing group admitted for the first time that some of its journalists had been involved in phone hacking and agreed to pay compensation to four people who sued for the alleged hacking of voicemails. Six other phone-hacking claims had already been settled. The BBC reported that it had seen legal papers showing that although the alleged hacking could have taken place as early as 1998, the bulk of the alleged wrongdoing took place in the early 2000s when Morgan was the Daily Mirror editor. The admissions by Trinity Mirror came whilst the Metropolitan Police were investigating into the phone hacking allegations. Morgan has always denied any involvement in the practice.

In June 2023, during his case against Morgan's former employer, Mirror Group Newspapers (MGN), Prince Harry accused Morgan of attacking himself and his wife, Meghan, Duchess of Sussex, to dissuade him from his legal action and of hacking his phone and that of his mother Diana, Princess of Wales. On 15 December 2023 Harry was awarded £140,600 by the High Court in damages against MGN, after 15 out of 33 sample articles about him in his claim were ruled as being the product of phone hacking or other unlawful information gathering. In the ruling, Mr Justice Fancourt said Morgan and other editors knew about the phone hacking at their publications and were involved in it. In a statement made in response to the ruling, Morgan denied that he was involved in any phone hacking and reviled Harry. His statement was met with widespread criticism including from the former chair of the Independent Press Standards Organisation Alan Moses.

As a result of the judge's ruling, the pressure group Hacked Off called for the police to open an investigation into possible perjury committed by senior staff members at The Mirror, during the Leveson Inquiry.

=== Post-Mirror press activities ===
In partnership with Matthew Freud, he gained ownership in May 2005 of Press Gazette, a media trade publication together with its "cash cow", the British Press Awards, in a deal worth £1 million. This ownership was cited as one of the reasons many major newspapers boycotted the 2006 awards. Press Gazette entered administrative receivership toward the end of 2006, before being sold to a trade buyer.

First News was launched by Morgan on 4 May 2006. A weekly paper aimed at seven to 14-year-olds, he said at its launch that the paper was to be "Britain's first national newspaper for children". Morgan was editorial director at First News, responsible for bringing in celebrity involvement. He referred to the role as "editorial overlord and frontman".

In 2012, following the revelation of Jimmy Savile's sexual abuse against children, Morgan said he had "never met" Savile in his lifetime, contradicting a 2009 piece he wrote in The Mail on Sunday's Night & Day magazine saying that "As I left, Jimmy Savile came up to me. 'Your TV shows are BRILLIANT!, he exclaimed. ... I've always loved Jimmy Savile."

In September 2014 Morgan became the first editor-at-large of the MailOnline website's US operation and wrote several columns a week.

== Television career ==
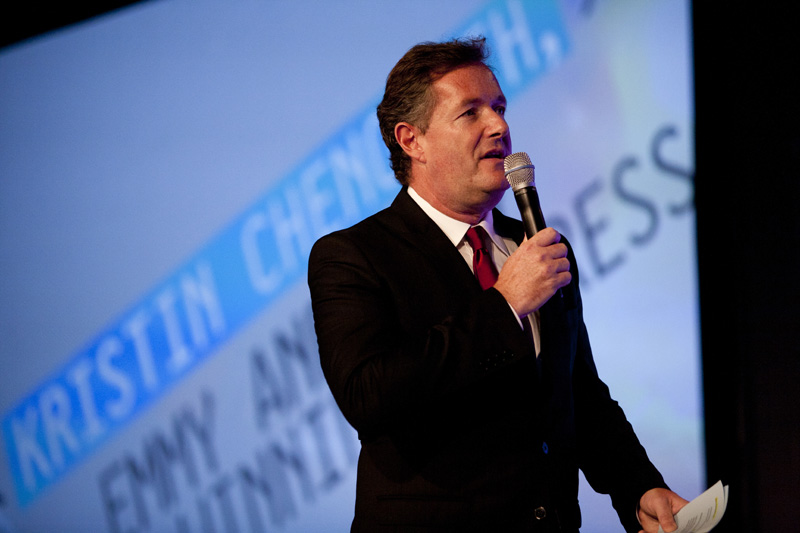
Morgan in 2012

Morgan's career expanded into television presenting before he left the Daily Mirror. He presented a three-part television documentary series for the BBC titled The Importance of Being Famous (2003), about fame and the manner in which celebrities are covered by modern media. At the annual Pride of Britain Awards broadcast on ITV, Morgan chaired a panel of prominent people who had chosen the recipients of the awards from 1999 to 2006. He co-hosted a current affairs interview show on Channel 4 with Amanda Platell, Morgan and Platell. Morgan and Platell were put together because of their opposing political viewpoints; Platell interrogated guests from the right wing, Morgan from the left wing. The show was dropped after three series reputedly because of poor viewing figures, although Channel 4 chairman Luke Johnson was reported not to like the programme.

Throughout 2006 Morgan appeared as a judge on the television show America's Got Talent alongside Brandy Norwood and David Hasselhoff on NBC. Morgan was chosen by Simon Cowell as a replacement for himself because of the conditions of his American Idol contract. Morgan appeared as a celebrity contestant on Comic Relief Does The Apprentice in 2007 to raise money for the BBC charity telethon Comic Relief. After his team lost, Morgan was selected by Alan Sugar as the contestant to be fired. In 2007, Morgan appeared as a judge for the second season of America's Got Talent and also appeared as a judge on Britain's Got Talent on ITV with Amanda Holden and Simon Cowell. He also presented You Can't Fire Me, I'm Famous on BBC One. He fronted a three-part documentary about Sandbanks for ITV entitled Piers Morgan on Sandbanks in January 2008. In 2008, Morgan signed a two-year "golden handcuffs" deal with ITV in May, reportedly worth £2 million per year. As part of the deal, he would continue as a judge on Britain's Got Talent for at least two more series and front a new chat show. He also made some interview specials, plus three more documentaries from various countries. Morgan's golden handcuffs deal was the first signing by ITV's new director of television, Peter Fincham.

In February 2009 he began a three-part series, Piers Morgan On..., which saw him visit Dubai, Monte Carlo and Hollywood. The programme returned for a second series in 2010 when Morgan visited Las Vegas in one episode. In 2009 Morgan also began hosting Piers Morgan's Life Stories on ITV, with Sharon Osbourne as the subject of the first episode. Other guests on the programme included Cheryl and the then Prime Minister Gordon Brown. On 17 January 2011 Morgan replaced Larry King in CNN's evening line-up with his show, Piers Morgan Live. After poor ratings, the show was cancelled in February 2014 and ended its run in March 2014. Commenting on the viewing figures, Morgan said that he was "a British guy debating American cultural issues, including guns, which has been very polarizing, and there is no doubt that there are many in the audience who are tired of me banging on about it."

From 13 to 17 April 2015, Morgan guest-hosted five episodes of Good Morning Britain on ITV and became a permanent co-host in November 2015, appearing alongside Susanna Reid and Charlotte Hawkins. He often clashed with Reid, who said of her colleague: "You can't help but go into battle with him every morning". Morgan left the series in March 2021 following a controversy over his remarks about Oprah with Meghan and Harry, which included a heated on-air argument with Alex Beresford.

From 2016 to 2017, Morgan interviewed female murderers on the TV series Killer Women with Piers Morgan. He also presented Serial Killer with Piers Morgan, as part of the 2017 Crime & Punishment season on ITV. In October 2018, Morgan appeared as a cameo on Hollyoaks.

=== Donald Trump ===
Morgan was the winner of the US celebrity version of The Apprentice in 2008. He was eventually the overall winner, being named Celebrity Apprentice by its host, Donald Trump, on 27 March, ahead of his fellow finalist, the American country music star Trace Adkins, and having raised substantially more cash than all the other contestants combined. Morgan was called "ruthless, arrogant, evil and obnoxious" by Trump in the final. Morgan stated he personally would not vote for Trump in the 2016 United States presidential election (though as a permanent resident of the United States, not a citizen, he is not qualified to vote). He predicted Trump's election as President of the United States and described himself as a close friend. Morgan interviewed Trump on Good Morning Britain in March 2016. Morgan appeared on ITV's Loose Women panel show in late January 2017, and was challenged to repudiate Trump. He stated that he disagreed with him on many issues including gun control, climate change, abortion and the "Muslim travel ban". On the latter he stated that Donald Trump had "singled out seven countries that are undeniably war-torn, and he said we need to be very careful who we let into America from these countries", adding that he found "the principle of what [Trump] is doing understandable", but that he disagreed with "the way [Trump] has gone about it".

Nearly a fortnight later, on the American talk show Real Time with Bill Maher, Morgan said "There is no Muslim ban", as "85% of the world's Muslims are allowed in the country". Another participant in the discussion, Australian comedian Jim Jefferies, immediately swore at Morgan and criticised his defence of Trump. After the novelist J. K. Rowling tweeted "Yes, watching Piers Morgan being told to fuck off on live TV is *exactly* as satisfying as I'd always imagined", the two began an exchange of words on the social media site. Morgan criticised Trump after Trump had retweeted Jayda Fransen, deputy leader of the small far-right fascist party Britain First, in late November 2017. He tweeted to Trump: "What the hell are you doing retweeting a bunch of unverified videos by Britain First, a bunch of disgustingly racist far-right extremists? Please STOP this madness & undo your retweets".

In January 2018 Morgan presented President Trump – The Piers Morgan Interview for ITV, which many thought of as "sycophantic" and a "love-in" for Trump. Of respondents to a Radio Times Twitter poll, 88% viewed Morgan as being not "tough enough" on Trump. Morgan interviewed Trump again in July 2018 during his official visit to the UK, this time on Air Force One during an internal flight, in a TV special entitled Piers, The President and Air Force One. In December 2018 Morgan wrote a letter to Trump formally applying to become White House Chief of Staff. During Trump's state visit to the United Kingdom in June 2019, Morgan once again interviewed Trump, this time at the Churchill War Rooms.

In April 2020, during the COVID-19 pandemic, Morgan wrote a highly critical article of Trump's handling of the crisis in his column for MailOnline. Morgan particularly took issue with Trump's suggestion of looking into "ingesting" disinfectant as a possible solution, describing it as "batshit crazy". In response to the criticism, Trump unfollowed Morgan on Twitter. In the aftermath of the January 6 United States Capitol attack, Morgan stated that Trump was "mentally unfit" to remain as president. He claimed that the pandemic and Trump's election loss that followed had "sent him nuts". In response to whether he regretted his support of Trump, Morgan said "No question. I never thought he was capable of this."

In April 2022 Trump sat down with Morgan for an interview. Morgan told Trump that he had lost a free and fair election, Trump responded with calling him a fool and later walking out of the interview, calling Morgan "dishonest". In 2023 Morgan expressed support for Ron DeSantis against Trump, saying "Republicans, do you want more drama and chaos and baggage, or do you want someone who is fresh, young, nearly half Trump's age, who doesn't have the baggage and believes in doing government a different way? Straightforward choice." Trump criticised both DeSantis and Morgan, posting "Ron DeSanctimonious is not working for the people of Florida as he should be, he is too busy chatting with a Ratings Challenged TV Host from England".

=== Meghan, Duchess of Sussex ===
Morgan was briefly a friend of Meghan Markle before she became the Duchess of Sussex, but said she cut him off early in her relationship with Prince Harry. He has been a regular critic of the couple since then, alleging they are hypocrites and claiming the Duchess is a social climber.

When the couple stepped away from conducting official royal duties early in 2020, Morgan described them as being "the two most spoiled brats in history". Ten days later, he said: "Only surprised it took her so long to get Harry to ditch his family, the monarchy, the military and his country. What a piece of work." In a segment of Good Morning Britain on 13 January, Morgan interviewed Afua Hirsch, who accused parts of the British media of behaving in a racist manner towards the Duchess, an interpretation that Morgan said was "completely and grotesquely wrong". InfluencHers, a group of 100 African Caribbean women, advocated an advertisers' boycott of Good Morning Britain. The campaigners described the programme as "sanctioning bullying and blatant unapologetic disrespect of women" in allowing Morgan's treatment of Hirsch.

When challenged by Decca Aitkenhead of The Sunday Times in May 2020 over "his vendetta" against the Duchess, with Aitkenhead suggesting he had gone too far, Morgan said: "I think that's a perfectly fair criticism. It's probably not wise, if you're a columnist, to make things too personal. Have I taken things a bit too far? Probably. Do I think that will govern and temper how I talk about them going forward? Absolutely."

On Good Morning Britain on 8 and 9 March 2021, Morgan said he doubted the accuracy of the account given by the Duchess of Sussex, in the interview Oprah with Meghan and Harry with Oprah Winfrey, in which she spoke of her mental health issues, which included suicidal thoughts, and she and Harry alleged racist comments from the extended family. A tense on-air argument with his co-host Alex Beresford on 9 March led him to walk off the set of the show. Beresford was highly critical of Morgan's attitude towards the Duchess, saying "She's entitled to cut you off if she wants to. Has she said anything about you after she cut you off? I don't think she has, But yet you continue to trash her". Later in the day, Morgan quit the programme. The UK's mental health charity Mind expressed "disappointment" in Morgan's comments and said individuals with experience of mental health issues should be "treated with dignity, respect and empathy". ITV plc's chief executive, Carolyn McCall, defended the veracity of the Duchess's comments, adding "importantly everyone should".

ITV News reported the Duchess had complained directly to ITV's CEO about Morgan's comments about mental health, although the broadcaster was not officially commenting on these reports. Ofcom received a complaint from her.

Morgan issued a statement on Twitter, saying, "On Monday, I said I didn't believe Meghan Markle in her Oprah interview. I've had time to reflect on this opinion, and I still don't. Freedom of speech is a hill I'm happy to die on." Broadcaster Andrew Neil described his departure as "a pity" for ITV because he had brought "energy, dynamism and controversy" to its morning broadcast schedule, adding "it had always lagged way behind the BBC breakfast time show and people tuned in because of him." Neil expressed interest in Morgan joining GB News instead. However, Neil later said that talks were affected by a disagreement: "he's [Morgan] got his own idea of what he is worth and we [GB News] have a slightly different idea of what he's worth". In Morgan's last week, Good Morning Britain surpassed the ratings of BBC Breakfast for the first time, and ITV lost almost £200m in market value following his departure.

The actor and comedian Steve Coogan, a prominent supporter of press regulation, described Morgan as "symptomatic of the problem" with the British tabloid media and accused him of "bullying behaviour" regarding his attitude to the Duchess.

On 29 November 2023 Morgan used his Piers Morgan Uncensored show to reveal the names of two members of the British royal family who had allegedly had conversations about the skin colour of Meghan's baby, mentioned during an interview with Oprah Winfrey in March 2021. Both Prince Harry and Meghan had refused to elaborate on who had made these claims. The journalist Omid Scobie named the royals in the Dutch version of his book Endgame, despite other versions not containing the names, and the book was pulled from sale. After Morgan had named the royals, a source for the family said they were "considering all options." Morgan defended his comments the following night, saying it was "entirely lawful" to name the royals.

=== Ofcom complaints ===
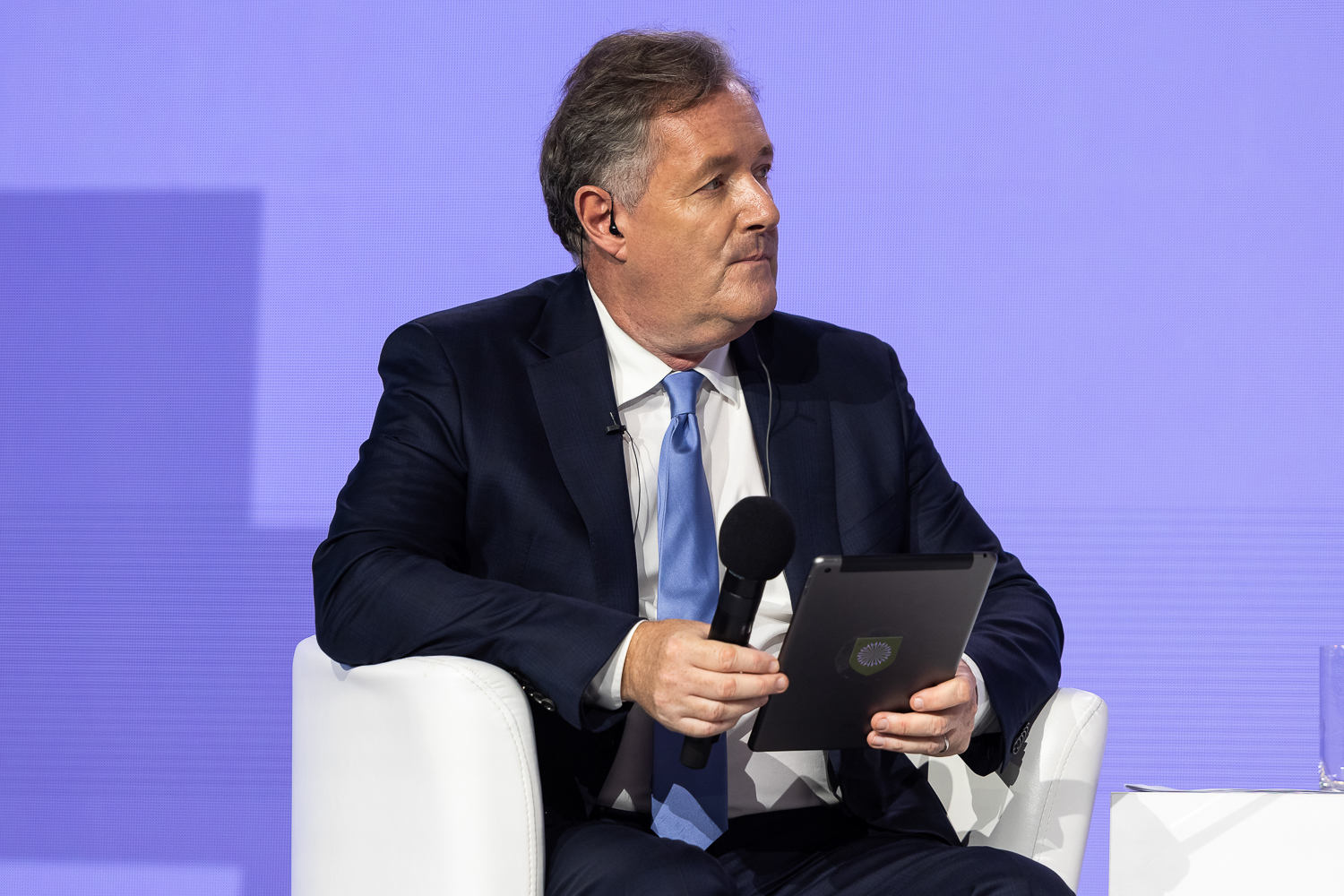
Morgan in 2022

Morgan's comments during his tenure at Good Morning Britain resulted in thousands of complaints to the British media watchdog Ofcom.

In 2015 Morgan was criticised by Ofcom for laughing as a guest repeatedly used the word 'fucking' live on air. Although Ofcom did not take action as his co-presenter Susanna Reid quickly apologised, the watchdog expressed concern at his behaviour.

In 2016 Ofcom received 70 complaints in relation to comments made by Morgan during an interview with the Christian magistrate Richard Page about gay marriage, comments that viewers felt "implied Christians were homophobic". Ofcom confirmed on 13 April 2016 that Morgan would not be investigated for his comments.

On 21 January 2020 Morgan was accused of racism and received 1,095 Ofcom complaints for his comments relating to a Chinese dairy advert in which he said "He's using ching chong ching milk". Morgan also spoke over the advert, saying "ching chang cho jo". He was accused online of using language that is used to antagonise Chinese people and of mocking the Chinese language.

After receiving 41,015 complaints, Ofcom launched an investigation on 9 March 2021 into the remarks Morgan made about the Duchess of Sussex's mental health on Good Morning Britain. The regulator confirmed on 12 March that the Duchess of Sussex had complained as well. On 17 March, it was reported that complaints against Morgan had reached 57,000, breaking Ofcom's record. Morgan remained defiant, stating "Only 57,000? I've had more people than that come up and congratulate me in the street for what I said. The vast majority of Britons are right behind me." Ofcom cleared ITV of any wrongdoing in September 2021 and added that restricting Morgan's views would be a "chilling restriction" on freedom of speech but criticised his "apparent disregard" for the subject of suicide. Morgan described the ruling as "a resounding victory for free speech and a resounding defeat for Princess Pinocchios."

=== Feuds and banned television guests ===
A feud between Morgan and A. A. Gill began when Morgan described Gill's partner Nicola Formby as a sex kitten on whom the mists of time had taken their toll and said she had shown him "porn shots" of herself. Gill said Morgan had made this up and called him a "pretty objectionable self-publicist".

In May 2011 Morgan banned the actor Hugh Grant from his shows on CNN and ITV after Grant spoke out against the need for the tabloid press. On Twitter he responded: "Hugh Grant is now banned, in perpetuity, from @PiersTonight and Life Stories and anything else I ever do. Tedious little man."

In 2014, Digital Spy reported that Morgan had an "ongoing feud" with Madonna and that she was "banned" from all TV shows that he works on.

In September 2012 it was reported that Morgan had also banned the actor Kelsey Grammer. Morgan himself said, "Kelsey Grammer saw a photo of his ex-wife Camille in the open of our show and legged it." TVGuide reported, "All plans were still a go for the segment until Grammer actually got in the hot seat and saw the footage the producers had planned to peg to the segment, including a picture of his ex-wife". The Huffington Post reported that "before the interview was scheduled, it was made clear that Grammer would answer all questions, including those about [his ex-wife]. His sole request was not to show any images of her."

On 4 February 2014 the transgender rights activist Janet Mock appeared as a guest on Piers Morgan Live to discuss her memoir, Redefining Realness. After the interview aired, Mock sent a series of tweets criticising Morgan for describing Mock as being "formerly a man". Morgan responded that he had "never been treated in such a disgraceful manner" by a guest. On 5 February, Mock appeared as a guest again to debate the dispute.

Morgan has repeatedly clashed with the actor and comedian John Cleese. In 2015, Cleese stated that he "truly detested" Morgan and had avoided him in a restaurant. He also said he thought Morgan was "in jail", erroneously stating that Morgan had "admitted" to authorising phone-hacking. Morgan responded that the "revulsion" between them was "mutual". When Cleese's tweet about detesting Morgan became his most popular to date, Cleese said "clearly I must insult the slimy, attention-seeking little prole more often". Morgan joked that he was glad to have been able to make Cleese "popular again". In 2017, Cleese told Radio Times: "I always thought he was an awful creep [...] I just didn't want to have an encounter with him, and since then, he's been after me and I've been after him." In 2025, Morgan accused Cleese of hypocrisy for taking money from a company owned by Rupert Murdoch.

Morgan strongly objected to the Women's March on Washington on 21 January 2017, the day after Trump's inauguration, describing protesters as "rabid feminists" and the multiple protests as being "vacuous". The actor Ewan McGregor disagreed with Morgan's statements on the Women's March and pulled out of appearing on Good Morning Britain the following Tuesday after discovering Morgan would be interviewing him, along with Reid. Morgan accused McGregor of being a "paedophile-loving hypocrite" for his past support of Roman Polanski.

=== Piers Morgan Uncensored ===
On 16 September 2021, News UK announced its new channel TalkTV would launch in 2022, with Morgan being the first name signed up. Morgan presented Piers Morgan Uncensored weeknights from 25 April 2022, the first and second episodes contained a new interview with Donald Trump. Within a week of the first broadcast, estimated audiences had declined by 80 percent, from 316,800 to 61,700 average viewers of Morgan's show. On 7 March 2023, he won the Scoop of the Year award at the British Sports Journalism Awards for his interview with Cristiano Ronaldo in November 2022. In June 2023, he won the TRIC award for the Interview of The Year award for the same broadcast. In February 2024, Morgan announced that Piers Morgan Uncensored would no longer be broadcast on TalkTV and would instead be shown exclusively on YouTube. Since September 2025, a weekly highlights show from YouTube episodes of the show has aired on Channel 5.

During the Gaza war, Morgan was criticised by Mehdi Hasan, Bassem Youssef and others, for his frequent use of the question "Do you condemn Hamas?" at the beginning of interviews with pro-Palestinian guests.

== Personal life ==
Morgan married Marion Shalloe, a hospital ward sister, in 1991. The couple had three sons, and separated in 2004 before divorcing in 2008. On 24 June 2010 he married his second wife, the journalist Celia Walden, daughter of the former Conservative MP George Walden in Swinbrook, Oxfordshire. They have a daughter. He lives in Kensington and has two other properties in Newick and Beverly Hills, California.

In 2007, Morgan was filmed falling off a Segway, breaking three ribs. Simon Cowell outspokenly mocked Morgan's previous comment in 2003, in a Mirror headline after the former US president George W. Bush fell off a Segway: "You'd have to be an idiot to fall off wouldn't you, Mr President". On 18 January 2026, Morgan posted to Instagram that he had fallen in a London restaurant, breaking his femoral neck, which necessitated hip replacement surgery.

Morgan is a supporter of the Premier League football club Arsenal. He was an outspoken critic of the former Arsenal manager Arsène Wenger and called for his sacking on many occasions. Speaking in defence of Wenger in 2015, the former Arsenal goalkeeper Bob Wilson labelled Morgan an "incredibly pompous individual". When the Arsenal midfielder Aaron Ramsey met Morgan on 26 April 2015, Ramsey refused to shake his hand due to the criticism he received from Morgan during the 2012–13 season. Morgan has responded by calling Ramsey 'whatshisname'.

Morgan identified as a supporter of the Conservative Party in a 1994 interview, saying he was "still basically a Tory", but expressed admiration for the recently elected Labour Party leader Tony Blair, saying "he's not radical, speaks well and makes sense". Morgan voted for the Animal Welfare Party in the 2015 general election due to his low opinion of all the main party leaders. He voted against Brexit in the 2016 EU referendum but voted for the Kensington Conservative candidate in the 2019 general election because of Boris Johnson's commitment to honour the result of the referendum. Morgan has also previously voted for the Labour Party. Following Labour's victory in the 2024 general election, he called its leader Keir Starmer "a good, decent, hard-working, self-made man". In November 2024 he identified as a centrist, adding "woke liberals are too loony-left for me".

Morgan is of Irish Catholic descent. He has often spoken of his Catholic faith and believes in an afterlife, but does not "go to confession, probably because it would take [him] too long". Morgan has stated he disagrees with several Church teachings, including that he supports the ordination of women.

Following a threat of litigation from Morgan, in September 2026, Earl Spencer issued an apology to Morgan for including an "incorrect assumption" in his newly published memoir, Swan Song: Diana, My Sister, that when Morgan was the editor of the Mirror, they had acquired and published intrusive gym photographs of Diana, Princess of Wales. Morgan, pointed out that he was working for The Sun at the time of the intrusion in 1993, and had not joined the Daily Mirror until he was appointed editor in 1995, by which time the litigation had been settled between the parties.

== Filmography ==
=== Television ===
Year	Title	Role	Notes
1996	Have I Got News for You	Himself	2 episodes
1999–2019	Question Time	Guest Panelist	21 episodes
2003	The Importance of Being Famous	Presenter	Three-part documentary
2003	Trust Me – I'm a Politician	Presenter	Documentary
2003–2004	Tabloid Tales	Presenter	2 series
2003–2005	The Wright Stuff	Guest Presenter	8 episodes
2004–2005	Morgan and Platell	Co-presenter	With Amanda Platell
2005	Death of Celebrity	Presenter	Documentary
2006–2007	You Can't Fire Me, I'm Famous	Presenter	Chat show
2006, 2007, 2020	Who Wants to Be a Millionaire	Celebrity Contestant	3 episodes
2006–2009	Hell's Kitchen	Himself	7 episodes
2006–2011, 2015	America's Got Talent	Judge	Main judge on Season 1–6 Guest judge on Season 10
2007–2010	Britain's Got Talent	Judge	Series 1–4
2007	Comic Relief Does The Apprentice	Celebrity Contestant	
2007	The Dame Edna Treatment	Himself	Guest; 1 episode
2007	The Tonight Show with Jay Leno	Himself	Alongside David Hasselhoff & Sharon Osbourne
2007	Royal Variety Performance 2007	Guest Announcer	Alongside Simon Cowell & Amanda Holden
2008–2015	The Celebrity Apprentice	Himself	21 episodes
2008	Piers Morgan on Sandbanks	Presenter	Three-part documentary
2008	The Dark Side of Fame with Piers Morgan	Presenter	1 series
2008	Al Murray's Happy Hour	Himself	Guest; 1 episode
2008–2016	Ant & Dec's Saturday Night Takeaway	Himself	5 episodes
2009–2010	Piers Morgan On...	Presenter	2 series
2009–2021	Piers Morgan's Life Stories	Presenter	
2010	When Piers Met Lord Sugar	Presenter	Documentary
2011–2014	Piers Morgan Live	Presenter	Talk show
2012	The Apprentice: You're Fired!	Himself	Special guest; 1 episode
2012	The Talent Show Story	Himself	5 episodes
2013	2 Broke Girls	Himself	1 episode
2015	Being Kevin Pietersen	Himself	Documentary
2015–2019	This Week	Guest Presenter	8 episodes
2015–2021	Good Morning Britain	Co-presenter	Monday–Wednesday with Susanna Reid
2016	Celebrity Juice	Himself	Guest; 3 episodes
2016	Second Chance	Himself	Cameo appearance; 1 episode
2016	Alan Carr: Chatty Man	Himself	Guest; 1 episode
2016	21st National Television Awards	Presenter	
2016–2017	Killer Women with Piers Morgan	Presenter	7 episodes
2017–2023	Real Time with Bill Maher	Himself	Guest; 4 episodes
2017–2018	Confessions of a Serial Killer with Piers Morgan	Presenter	4 episodes
2018	President Trump – The Piers Morgan Interview	Presenter	Television special
2018	Hollyoaks	Himself	Cameo appearance; 1 episode
2018	Piers, the President and Air Force One	Presenter	Documentary
2018–2022	Tucker Carlson Tonight	Guest Panelist	10 episodes
2019	Psychopath with Piers Morgan	Presenter	Documentary
2019	Cristiano Ronaldo Meets Piers Morgan	Presenter	Television special
2019	Soccer Aid	Himself	Assistant Manager to World XI squad
2019	The Celebrity Chase	Himself	Contestant; Good Morning Britain Special
2021	60 Minutes	Himself	1 episode
2022	Fox & Friends	Fox Nation Host	6 episodes
2022	Gutfeld!	Guest Panelist	2 episodes
2022	The Five	Guest Host	7 episodes
2022–present	Piers Morgan Uncensored	Presenter	Originally on TalkTV in UK; shown on Sky News Australia and Fox Nation in America. Now on YouTube.

=== Film ===
Year	Title	Role	Notes
2012	Flight	Himself	Cameo appearance
2012	The Campaign	Himself	Cameo appearance
2013	World War Z	Himself	Cameo appearance
2013	One Chance	Himself	Cameo appearance
2015	Entourage	Himself	Cameo appearance
2016	Criminal	Himself	Cameo appearance
2020	The Accidental President	Himself	Cameo appearance

== Bibliography ==
- Morgan, Piers; John Sachs (1991). Secret Lives. Blake. ISBN 0-905846-95-8.
- Morgan, Piers; John Sachs (1991). Private Lives of the Stars. Angus and Robertson. ISBN 0-207-16941-1.
- Morgan, Piers (1992). To Dream a Dream: Amazing Life of Phillip Schofield. Blake. ISBN 1-85782-006-1.
- Morgan, Piers (1993). "Take That": Our Story. Boxtree. ISBN 1-85283-839-6.
- Morgan, Piers (1994). "Take That": On the Road. Boxtree. ISBN 1-85283-396-3.
- Morgan, Piers (2004). Va Va Voom!: A Year with Arsenal 2003–04. Methuen. ISBN 0-413-77451-1.
- Morgan, Piers (2005). The Insider: The Private Diaries of a Scandalous Decade. Ebury Press. ISBN 0-09-190849-3.
- Morgan, Piers (2007). Don't You Know Who I Am?. Ebury Press.
- Morgan, Piers (2009). God Bless America: Misadventures of a Big Mouth Brit. Ebury Press. ISBN 978-0-09-191393-9.
- Morgan, Piers (2013). Shooting Straight: Guns, Gays, God, and George Clooney. Gallery Books. ISBN 978-1-4767-4505-3.
- Morgan, Piers (2020). Wake Up: Why the World Has Gone Nuts. Harper Collins. ISBN 978-0008392598.
- Morgan, Piers (2025). Woke Is Dead: How Common Sense Triumphed in an Age of Total Madness. Harper Collins. ISBN 978-0008555498.

== Notes ==
Media offices
Preceded by Sean Fletcher and John Stapleton	Main presenter of Good Morning Britain; 2015–2021	Succeeded by TBD
Preceded by Patsy Chapman	Editor of the News of the World; 1994–1995	Succeeded by Phil Hall
Preceded by Colin Myler	Editor of the Daily Mirror; 1995–2004	Succeeded by Richard Wallace
