= Martin Dunn (journalist) =

British journalist and editor

Martin Dunn (born 26 January 1955) is a British journalist and former newspaper editor.

Dunn attended Dudley Grammar School, then started his journalistic career on the Dudley Herald. In 1977, he moved to the Birmingham Evening Mail, then the Birmingham Post, and the Daily Mail. After a period as a freelance, he joined The Sun in 1983, as the papers' New York correspondent. In 1988, he became the Deputy Editor of the News of the World, and the following year, Deputy Editor of The Sun.

He left the News International group in 1991 to take up a post as Editor of Today, where he spent two years, before moving to become Editor of the Boston Herald, and almost immediately editor-in-chief of the New York Daily News. In 1996, he moved on to Channel One Television, then worked for DMG New Media and DMG Front of Mind. In 2003, he again became editor-in-chief of the New York Daily News, leaving in 2010 after his wife, Debbie Hickman, had become ill with cancer. Hickman died in January 2014.

Media offices
Preceded by Phil Wrack	Deputy Editor of the News of the World; 1988–1989 with Phil Wrack	Succeeded by Paul Connew
Preceded by Wendy Henry	Deputy Editor of The Sun; 1989–1991	Succeeded by Stuart Higgins
Preceded by David Montgomery	Editor of Today; 1991–1993	Succeeded by Richard Stott
