= Crisis Command =

British interactive drama documentary

- Presented by: Gavin Hewitt
- No. of episodes: 4

Original release
- Network: BBC Two
- Release: 3 February – 14 September 2004

Crisis Command – Could You Run the Country? is a BBC Two role-playing interactive drama documentary which was based on realistic scenarios and dramatised situations that Britain could face one day. All episodes were first aired in 2004.

The programme gave three people the chance to run the country during a potential disaster. The crises included terror attacks on London, flood, plague and hostage taking. Viewers were able to make decisions interactively at the same time as the studio players. The programmes were filmed in real time and edited down to one-hour programmes. Each scenario was played once on BBC Two, and then redone with a different set of "Ministers" on BBC Four immediately afterwards.

They receive advice from military, police and communication experts, but the final decisions are down to them alone. Presented by Gavin Hewitt, Crisis Command – Could You Run The Country? was a test of confidence and the ability to prioritise and keep calm in a tense and rapidly evolving situation.

It examined the dilemmas ministers face when dealing with crisis, and the hard decisions necessary to make to save lives.

Against the clock, the participants were able to call upon three advisors: military advisor Lord Tim Garden, communications adviser Amanda Platell and emergency services advisor Charles Shoebridge.

== Cast and crew ==
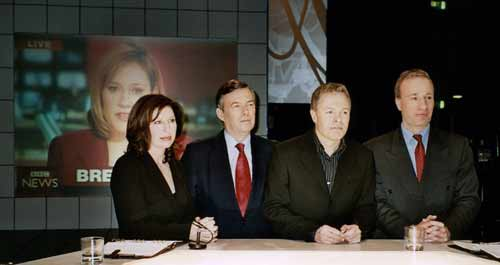
Crisis Command cast

- Gavin Hewitt, host
- Sir Tim Garden, military expert and co-host
- Amanda Platell, communications expert and co-host
- Charles Shoebridge, emergency services expert and co-host
- Peter Burnell, inventor

== Episodes ==
No. overall	No. in series	Title	Original release date
1	Pilot	"Hijack: Pilot"	3 February 2004
2	1	"Plague"	5 September 2004
3	2	"Hostage"	7 September 2004
4	3	"Flood"	14 September 2004
