= Shelley von Strunckel =

American astrologer

Shelley von Strunckel (born 15 July 1946) is a California-born sun sign astrologer with newspaper columns widely published in Europe, the Middle East, Australia and Asia.

After working in fashion merchandising in the USA, von Strunckel became a consulting astrologer. In 1992, the editor of The Sunday Times, Andrew Neil invited her to create the first ever astrological column in a British broadsheet newspaper. In addition to the Sunday Times, she has written columns for Hong Kong's South China Morning Post, the Gulf News, English, French and Chinese Vogue. and the Times of India. She also appeared on a special "Paranormal Edition" episode of the game show The Weakest Link, In which she was the 6th one voted off.
