= Colour supplement =

Magazine with full-colour printing packaged with a newspaper

A colour supplement or colour magazine is a magazine with full-colour printing, typically printed on glossy paper, that is packaged with a newspaper. Some colour supplements are Sunday magazines, but may also be included with a daily newspaper.

The Sunday Times Magazine (originally called the Sunday Times Colour Section) was the first colour supplement to be published as a supplement to a British newspaper in 1962, and its arrival "broke the mould of weekend newspaper publishing".

The success of the Sunday Times Magazine led to other newspapers, both broadsheet and tabloid, adding their own colour supplements, beginning in 1964 with The Daily Telegraph and The Observer colour supplements, the Observer Magazine and Weekend Telegraph (later the Telegraph Magazine).

The Daily Mirror started to include a colour supplement in 1969.

== See also ==
- Sunday comics
