= Patsy Chapman =

British newspaper editor

Patsy Chapman (born 3 May 1948) is a former British newspaper editor.

Chapman grew up in Romford and worked on the magazine Boyfriend before becoming a reporter with the Romford Times. She then joined The Sun and was gradually promoted to become Deputy Editor. In 1988, she swapped jobs with Wendy Henry to become Editor of the News of the World.

In 1990, Chapman chaired the group which drew up the code of conduct that the Press Complaints Commission subsequently enforced. She was then a member of the first Commission.

Chapman stepped down as editor of News of the World in 1993 due to illness.

Media offices
Preceded by ?	Deputy Editor of The Sun; 1986–1988	Succeeded by Wendy Henry
Preceded by Wendy Henry	Editor of the News of the World; 1988–1994	Succeeded by Piers Morgan
