= Nova (UK magazine) =

Defunct glossy monthly magazine

- Categories: Women's magazine
- Frequency: Monthly
- First issue: March 1965; 60 years ago
- Final issue: October 1975
- Company: IPC
- Country: United Kingdom
- Based in: London
- Language: English
- ISSN: 0029-4977

Nova was a British glossy magazine that was published from March 1965 to October 1975. It was described by The Times as "a politically radical, beautifully designed, intellectual women's magazine." Nova covered such once-taboo subjects as abortion, cancer, the birth control pill, race, homosexuality, divorce and royal affairs. It featured stylish and provocative cover images.

== History ==
Founded by the magazine publishing company George Newnes, part of the International Publishing Corporation (known informally as IPC), Nova was initially edited by Harry Fieldhouse and described itself as "A new kind of magazine for the new kind of woman". From its seventh edition Dennis Hackett took over as editor with Kevin d'Arcy as assistant editor, Harri Peccinotti as art editor, Alma Birk as editorial adviser, with Penny Vincenzi and later Molly Parkin and Caroline Baker as fashion editors. David Gibbs's comprehensive anthology of Nova pages and images says of Parkin, who trained as a painter: "A dynamic sense of colour and design was all she needed to guide her. Unfettered by the accepted wisdom of the fashion system, she introduced an unconventional and startling view of what women could wear... always teasing the edges of taste... She set the standard."

At Nova, Peccinotti became one of the first professional photographers to use black models extensively in his fashion shoots. He stated in an interview: “Nova started as an experiment. The thinking behind it came from the fact that there were no magazines at the time for intelligent women... The women’s liberation movement was strong and there were a lot of good female writers. Nova’s aim was to talk about what women were really interested in: politics, careers, health, sex. George Newnes threw some money in, just to see if anyone was interested in a magazine like that, and so it started.”

The distinctive Nova headline font, adapted by Pentagram from a vintage woodcut typeface, became a formative influence on typography for many years. As part of a revolution in graphic design led by the progenitors Town, Queen, Elle and The Sunday Times Magazine, Nova took specific inspiration from the universally admired German magazine Twen. At Nova between 1966 and 1969 Derek Birdsall, John Blackburn and Bill Fallover continued expanding the role of a magazine art director who on some titles assumed a role as powerful as its editors.

Long-form contributors to Nova included such notable and disparate writers as Graham Greene, Lynda Lee-Potter, Christopher Booker, Susan Sontag, Kenneth Allsop, Robert Robinson, Elizabeth David, with agony aunt Irma Kurtz and astrologer Patric Walker making his name as Novalis. Nova also published the autobiographical writing of Arthur Hopcraft, later expanded into his 1970 book The Great Apple Raid and Other Encounters of a Tin Chapel Tiro. In the early 1970s it featured experimental "impressionistic" fashion photographs by Helmut Newton, Don McCullin, Hans Feurer and Terence Donovan. Illustrators included Mel Calman and Stewart Mackinnon.

Nova's radical approach to female liberation aroused men's curiosity too and it became famous in publishing circles as a woman's magazine that had more male readers than female, which was an aspect of its financial decline during the economic crisis of the 1970s.

The magazine was revived in May 2000, but it lasted just 13 issues, closing with its June 2001 issue.

Hillman and Peccinotti’s history of the magazine, Nova 1965-75, was reissued in September 2019 with a new introduction.

== In popular culture ==
In 2024, Guy Chambers released a track entitled 'Nova' marking the content and existence of the magazine.
