= Fenchurch (clothing) =

Defunct English clothing company

Fenchurch International Ltd.
- Type: Distributor and wholesaler
- Industry: Consumer goods
- Founded: 2000
- Headquarters: London, England
- Products: Apparel clothing
- Net income: USD $5-10M
- Number of employees: 0
- Parent: JD Sports
- Website: www.fenchurch.com

Fenchurch was a skater clothing company based in Acton, London, England.

== History ==
Fenchurch was founded in 2000, and the brand name is derived from Fenchurch Street railway station in the City of London. The brand launched in 2001, and its marketing on a team of sponsored professional skateboarders and BMXers. A year after opening its flagship store, Fenchurch was included in Time Out London's list of "London's 50 best boutiques" Fenchurch products went on sale in 2002 and sales expanded into continental Europe during 2003. In 2005, they opened a store on Earlham Street in Covent Garden.

== Products ==
Fenchurch produced male and female skateboarding fashion collections, accessories, shoes and luggage. In 2007, the company produced a bag made from drink can ring pulls in association with the HIV/AIDS charity Bottletop. The collection includes T-shirts embroidered with the Fenchurch stitch. Fenchurch also produces a Fenchurch Friendly collection of organic and fair trade clothing. A capsule collection in collaboration with the Baguette Fingers was planned for the Spring/Summer 2021, including oversized cargo pants, cropped cycling shorts, and pop socks.

== Administration ==
After one of its founding directors, Marc Ball, left the company due to internal disagreements, it was announced in February 2011 that Fenchurch International Limited was insolvent and seeking investment. On 18 March 2011, it was announced that JD Sports had bought Fenchurch and made all staff redundant, except the Creative Director, Chris Isherwood.
