= Eve Pollard =

English journalist and author (born 1943)

Eve Pollard OBE
- Born: Evelyn Pollak; 25 December 1943 (age 82); Paddington, London, England
- Occupations: Journalist; editor
- Spouses: Barry Winkleman (m. 1968; div. 1975) Nicholas Lloyd (m. 1979)
- Children: 2, including Claudia Winkleman
- Website: www.eve-pollard.co.uk

Evelyn, Lady Lloyd (née Pollak, formerly Winkleman, born 25 December 1943) is an English author and journalist, and has been the editor of several tabloid newspapers.

== Early life and education ==
Pollard was born Evelyn Pollak in Paddington, London.

In her early years Pollard (then known as Pollak) lived in Maida Vale, London, with her Jewish parents Izzo and Martha; and younger twin brothers, Peter and Ralph Pollak, who now live in Southern California in the United States. Her mother had left Austria in 1938 and her Hungarian father arrived with the Free French in 1940.

She attended a girls' grammar school in London where she developed a love of journalism.

== Career ==
Her career began at Honey magazine, where she eventually became fashion editor in 1967. She moved to the Daily Mirror the following year.

In 1985, Pollard was launch editor-in-chief of Elle magazine in the US and edited Sunday magazine for the News of the World and You magazine for the Mail on Sunday. She edited the Sunday Mirror between 1987 and 1991, and then the Sunday Express from 1991 to 1994. She has also worked in television as features editor of TV-am (1982–1983) and devised Frocks on the Box, which ran for two 13-part series in the 1980s, for the ITV contractor TVS. She has often appeared on radio and TV and was a regular participant in Through the Keyhole. In 2003 Pollard was a guest panellist on the talk show Loose Women.

In 1992, she founded Women in Journalism. She was the first Chair and is still the Honorary President of the organisation, which advises members on networking, campaigning and training. In 2003, she became the Vice-Chairman of Wellbeing of Women, a charity dedicated to improving the health of women and babies in the UK.

In 2016, she was appointed the first Chair of Reporters without Borders in the UK. In June 2019, she was awarded the prestigious Journalist Laureate prize by the London Press Club. She was given the accolade for being an inspirational editor and broadcaster.

She has been a member, appointed in 1999, of the Competition Commission’s Newspaper Takeover Panel. Her publications include Jackie, a biography of Jacqueline Kennedy Onassis (1971), and she has jointly written four novels: Splash (1995), Best of Enemies (1996), Double Trouble (1997) and Unfinished Business (1998). She was set up in the Brass Eye episode "Science" in 1997.

== Honours ==
Pollard was appointed Officer of the Order of the British Empire (OBE) in the 2008 Birthday Honours List for services to journalism.

== Personal life ==
She married Barry Winkleman (born 1939) in Hendon, north London, in 1968. They have a daughter, TV presenter Claudia Winkleman. Their marriage ended in divorce in 1975.

In April 1979 in Islington, London, Pollard married Nicholas Lloyd, a former editor of the Daily Express (1986–95); the couple have a son.

Media offices
Preceded by Michael Molloy	Editor of the Sunday Mirror; 1988–1991	Succeeded by Bridget Rowe
Preceded by Robin Morgan	Editor of the Sunday Express; 1991–1994	Succeeded by Brian Hitchen
