= David Montgomery (newspaper executive) =

British media executive (born 1948)

David Montgomery (born November 6, 1948) is a British media executive, proprietor and media investor. He has also edited two tabloid newspapers during the course of his career.

== Early life and career ==
Montgomery was born in Penrith, New South Wales, Australia, and attended Bangor Grammar School and Queen's University in Belfast, where he studied history and politics and edited the student magazine The Gown.

In 1973 he joined the staff on the Daily Mirror, one of the UK's large-circulation tabloids. He became chief sub-editor in 1978. two years later he moved over to the rival publication, The Sun.

== Newspaper editor ==
Montgomery was later editor of News of the World from 1985 to 1987. He then became director of News UK, a subsidiary of News International owned by Rupert Murdoch's News Corporation. Between 1987 and 1991, Montgomery was editor of the Today newspaper, by then owned by Murdoch.

Between 1992 and 1999 he was chief executive of Mirror Group plc—publishers of the Daily Mirror and other national titles and a range of regional titles—following the death of its previous owner Robert Maxwell in 1991. During his tenure as Mirror Group CEO Montgomery oversaw a number of changes, including taking a stake in The Independent and its sister-paper The Independent on Sunday. At the time, he was nicknamed "Rommel" by staff because "Montgomery was on our side".

Early in 1999 Montgomery stepped down from the Mirror Group CEO role after some well-publicised running disagreements with the boardroom and the non-executive chairman Sir Victor Blank, and after a period for the company described by some commentators as "crisis-hit".

== Later career ==
In 2000 Montgomery founded Mecom Group, a London-based investment company that would specialise in mergers and acquisitions of newspaper and media companies in continental Europe. Mecom embarked on a series of European magazine and newspaper acquisition deals, including the 2005 purchase of Berliner Verlag, publisher of Berliner Zeitung and Berliner Kurier. The acquisition was made in partnership with the American private equity firm and media broker Veronis Suhler Stevenson, part-financed with credit loans. Montgomery and his equity partners thereby became the first foreign owners of a German publishing group. The sale generated a degree of controversy among some German media observers, with a number of journalists and staff at Berliner Verlag's titles protesting against the sale and voicing concerns over the direction the new shareholders would take the publications.

In 2012, Montgomery formed Local World Limited, and acquired a number of regional papers which were later sold to Trinity Mirror (now known as Reach plc), with Montgomery going on to form a new company called National World.

In 2020, Montgomery's National World company bought JPIMedia, publisher of The Scotsman and The Yorkshire Post, in a £10m deal which also included many other local newspapers.

In 2021, Montgomery (as chairman of Local Television Limited) launched a rival to channel 7 Freeview service That's TV in Manchester on channel 99 and outlined plans for a new 'Northern TV Network' which would include Local TV's channels in Liverpool, Leeds and Newcastle.

== Personal life ==
Montgomery is married to the painter Hon. Sophie Montgomery. She is the daughter of The 3rd Baron Birdwood and ex-wife of The 3rd Earl of Woolton.

== Notes ==
Media offices
Preceded by Nicholas Lloyd	Editor of the News of the World; 1985–1987	Succeeded by Wendy Henry
Preceded by Dennis Hackett	Editor of Today; 1987–1991	Succeeded by Martin Dunn
