= Today (UK newspaper) =

National newspaper in the United Kingdom

- Type: Daily newspaper
- Format: Tabloid
- Owner(s): Eddy Shah (1986); Lonrho (1986–1987); News International (1987–1995)
- Founded: 4 March 1986
- Ceased publication: 17 November 1995
- Headquarters: Wapping, London

Today was a national newspaper in the United Kingdom that was published between 1986 and 1995. It was an early adopter of electronic production and colour printing.

== History ==
Today, with the American newspaper USA Today as an inspiration, launched on Tuesday 4 March 1986, with the front-page headline, "Second Spy Inside GCHQ". The staff included Jane Reed who had transformed Woman's Own in the 1970s. She joined before the launch and was a managing editor looking after features.

At 18p (equivalent to 54p in 2025), it was a middle-market tabloid, a rival to the long-established Daily Mail and Daily Express. It pioneered computer photo-typesetting and full-colour offset printing at a time when national newspapers were still using Linotype machines, letterpress and could only reproduce photographs in black and white. The colour was initially crude, produced on equipment which had no facility for colour proofing, so the first view of the colour was on the finished product. However, it forced the conversion of all UK national newspapers to electronic production and colour printing. The newspaper's motto, hung in the newsroom, was "propa truth, not propaganda".

Launched by regional newspaper entrepreneur Eddy Shah, it was bought by Tiny Rowland's conglomerate Lonrho within four months. Shah subsequently launched the short-lived, unsuccessful national tabloid The Post in 1988. Alastair Campbell was political editor and his partner, Fiona Millar, was news editor.

Alongside the daily newspaper, a Sunday edition was launched. Sunday Today suffered from having three editors in less than a year, and was closed early in 1987 as a cost-saving measure.

The newspaper began a sponsorship of the English Football League at the start of 1986–87, but withdrew after a season. Today was sold to Rupert Murdoch's News International in 1987. Today was based in 70 Vauxhall Bridge Road, Pimlico, London, prior to moving to Wapping.

Today ceased publication on 17 November 1995, the first long-running national newspaper title to close since the Daily Sketch in 1971. The last edition's headline was 'Goodbye, it's been great to know you". The editorial said: "Now we are forced into silence by the granite and unforgiving face of the balance sheet".

Richard Stott was editor when Today ceased publication. Other journalists at the close included Peter Prendergast (city editor), Anne Robinson (columnist), Barry Wigmore (US editor, based in New York), Olga Craig, Chris Hutchins, David McMaster (managing editor) and the MP Tony Banks (football correspondent).

== Controversies ==
In the immediate aftermath of the 1995 Oklahoma City bombing, the paper showed a fireman carrying the body of a young girl under the headline "In the name of Islam", however it was found that the bombing had been perpetrated by two anti-government white supremacists.

In 1996, Hugh Grant won damages from News UK over what his lawyers called a "highly defamatory" article in January 1995. The newspaper had falsely claimed that Grant verbally abused a young extra with a "foul-mouthed tongue lashing" on the set of The Englishman Who Went Up a Hill But Came Down a Mountain.

== Editors of Today ==
1985: Brian MacArthur
1987: Dennis Hackett
1987: David Montgomery
1991: Martin Dunn
1993: Richard Stott

== Editors of Sunday Today ==
1986: Anthony Holden
1986: Peter McKay
1986: Bill Hagerty
