= Sunday Mirror =

UK Sunday national newspaper

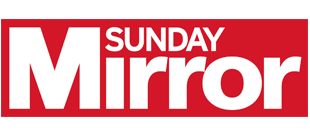

- Front page of the Sunday Mirror on 4 September 2016, alleging that Labour MP Keith Vaz had solicited male prostitutes. He resigned as chairman of the Home Affairs Select Committee days later.
- Type: Weekly newspaper
- Format: Tabloid
- Owner: Reach plc
- Editor: Chloe Hubbard
- Founded: 1915
- Political alignment: Labour
- Headquarters: One Canada Square, London, United Kingdom
- Circulation: 125,704 (as of September 2025)
- ISSN: 9975-9950
- OCLC number: 436610738
- Website: mirror.co.uk

The Sunday Mirror is the Sunday sister paper of the Daily Mirror. It began life in 1915 as the Sunday Pictorial and was renamed the Sunday Mirror in 1963. (Note: The UK-based parent company, Reach plc also owns the Sunday People.) In 2016 it had an average weekly circulation of 620,861, dropping markedly to 505,508 the following year. Competing closely with other papers, in July 2011, on the second weekend after the closure of the News of the World, more than 2,000,000 copies sold, the highest level since January 2000.

== History ==
=== Sunday Pictorial (1915–1963) ===
The paper launched as the Sunday Pictorial on 14 March 1915.

Lord Rothermere – who owned the paper – introduced the Sunday Pictorial to the British public with the idea of striking a balance between socially responsible reporting of great issues of the day and sheer entertainment.

The first editor of the Sunday Pictorial, or the Sunday Pic as it was commonly known, was F.R Sanderson.

His launch edition led with three stories on the front page, two of which reported from the front line of the war: "THE TASK OF THE RED CROSS" and "ALL THAT WAS LEFT OF A BIG GUN".

From day one the paper was a huge success, and within six months of launch the Sunday Pictorial was selling more than one million copies.

One of the reasons for this early success was due to a series of articles written by Winston Churchill. In 1915, Churchill, disillusioned with government, resigned from the Cabinet. The articles he then wrote for the Sunday Pictorial attracted such high levels of interest that sales lifted by 400,000 copies every time his stories appeared.

A further reason for the paper's success was its political influence. As a popular paper that always spoke its mind, the Sunday Pictorial struck a chord with millions.

Sport was also a key ingredient of the Sunday Pictorial's success. Football, even then, made it onto the front pages, and for many of the same reasons it does today: "WEMBLEY STADIUM STORMED BY EXCITED CUP FINAL CROWDS" dominates a front page from 1923.

Although the paper's early life started with a flourish, by the mid-1930s its success began to flounder. That, however, all changed when the editorship was given to 24-year-old Hugh Cudlipp in 1937. Within three years of taking over he saw the circulation of the paper rise to more than 1,700,000 by the time he went to fight in World War II in 1940.

On resuming the editorship in 1946, (Note: After a distinguished war service, see Hugh Cudlipp) Cudlipp successfully developed the Sunday Pic to reflect the greater social awareness of the post-war years. In all, Cudlipp edited the title for three long spells. After his final editorship in 1953 he became editor-in-chief and then editorial director of Mirror Group, where he pushed the daily title, the Daily Mirror, to a circulation in excess of five million copies.

=== Sunday Mirror (1963 to date) ===
In 1963 the newspaper's name was changed to the Sunday Mirror.

One of the earliest stories covered by the newly named paper was the Profumo affair, which was catastrophic for the government of the day. While frontbenchers involved in sleaze scandals exposed in the British press have often led to reshuffles, contemporary accounts and later research has credited the coverage, associating the involved young socialite to a Russian senior attaché, for triggering the replacement of the Conservative prime minister with another, Alec Douglas-Home. This leader was less popular, and alongside many press reports of scandals in the Macmillan Ministry, this led to the party's election defeat of 1964 and to the establishment of the second Labour government after World War II led by two-time prime minister Harold Wilson.

In 1974, following a succession of editors, Robert Edwards took the chair and within a year, circulation rose to 5.3 million. Edwards remained for a record 13 years, and ended as deputy chairman of Mirror Group in 1985.

By the end of his time in charge Edwards oversaw the introduction of colour to the paper (in 1988). The paper also introduced the Sunday Mirror Magazine which had an extra-large format and was printed on glossy paper. It had the best of big name stories, star photographs, money-saving offers and glittering prizes for competition winners. Today's incarnation of the magazine is Notebook.

In 2001 Tina Weaver was appointed editor of the Sunday Mirror, a position she held for 11 years until her dismissal. Since its launch the paper has had 25 editors in total including current editor-in-chief Lloyd Embley.

In 2012 the Sunday Mirror broke the world exclusive that one of the two Moors murderers, (Note: Also described in the paper as Britain's most notorious prisoner) Ian Brady, had died but been resuscitated, brought back to life against his will.

A former Sunday Mirror investigations editor, Graham Johnson, pleaded guilty to intercepting voicemail messages in 2001. Johnson is the first Mirror Group Newspapers journalist to admit to phone hacking. He voluntarily contacted police in 2013.

== Editors ==
The Sunday Pictorial

1915: F. R. Sanderson
1921: William McWhirter
1924: David Grant
1928: William McWhirter
1929: David Grant
1938: Hugh Cudlipp
1940: Stuart Campbell
1946: Hugh Cudlipp
1949: Philip Zec
1952: Hugh Cudlipp
1953: Colin Valdar
1959: Lee Howard
1961: Reg Payne

The Sunday Mirror

1963: Michael Christiansen
1972: Bob Edwards
1984: Peter Thompson
1986: Mike Molloy
1988: Eve Pollard
1991: Bridget Rowe
1992: Colin Myler
1994: Paul Connew
1995: Tessa Hilton
1996: Amanda Platell (acting)
1997: Bridget Rowe
1998: Brendon Parsons
1998: Colin Myler
2001: Tina Weaver
2012: Alison Phillips
2016: Gary Jones
2018: Peter Willis
2020: Paul Henderson
2021: Gemma Aldridge
2024: Caroline Waterston
