= Ink (2026 film) =

Film by Danny Boyle

- British teaser poster
- Directed by: Danny Boyle
- Screenplay by: James Graham
- Based on: Ink by James Graham
- Produced by: Tracey Seaward; Danny Boyle; Tessa Ross; Michael Ellenberg
- Starring: Jack O'Connell; Guy Pearce; Claire Foy
- Cinematography: Alwin H. Küchler
- Edited by: Fin Oates
- Music by: Daniel Pemberton
- Production companies: House Productions; Media Res
- Distributed by: StudioCanal (France and United Kingdom); Netflix (United States)
- Release dates: 2 September 2026 (Venice); 11 December 2026 (United States); 6 January 2027 (France); 8 January 2027 (United Kingdom)
- Running time: 116 minutes
- Countries: France; United Kingdom; United States
- Language: English

Ink is a 2026 biographical drama film directed by Danny Boyle from a screenplay by James Graham adapted from his 2017 stage play. A co-production of the United Kingdom, France, and the United States, its plot follows Larry Lamb (Jack O'Connell) as he accepts Rupert Murdoch's (Guy Pearce) offer to be the editor of the British tabloid newspaper The Sun.

Ink had its world premiere as the opening film of the 83rd Venice International Film Festival on 2 September 2026, where it competed for the Golden Lion. It is scheduled to be released in select cinemas in the United States on 11 December 2026, before its streaming debut by Netflix on 8 January 2027. It will also be theatrically released by StudioCanal in France on 6 January 2027 and in the United Kingdom on 8 January. The film received generally positive reviews from critics, who praised Boyle's direction.

== Cast ==
- Jack O'Connell as Larry Lamb, the Yorkshire-born editor for The Sun and former Northern editor for The Daily Mirror
- Guy Pearce as Rupert Murdoch, an Australian businessman and newspaper magnate who becomes The Sun's new owner
- Claire Foy as Jules Davies, a reporter for The Sun and Larry's mistress; Jules is a fictional character who is an amalgam of various female reporters who worked on Fleet Street at the time
- Blake Harrison as Ray, chief subeditor for The Sun
- Patrick Kennedy as Bernard Shrimsley, deputy editor for The Sun
- Angus Imrie as Beverley Goodway, house photographer of Page 3 girls for The Sun
- Brian Gleeson as Brian, news reporter for The Sun
- Bertie Carvel as Hugh Cudlipp, editor-in-chief for The Mirror and Larry's former boss; Carvel originated the role of Rupert Murdoch in the original play
- Jonathan Hyde as Sir Alick McKay, Murdoch's deputy and senior executive at News Limited
- Lucy Russell as Muriel McKay, Alick's wife
- Christopher Fulford as Frank, sports editor for The Sun

== Production ==
The film is adapted by James Graham from his own stage play Ink. It is directed by Danny Boyle and produced by StudioCanal, Media Res, and House Productions. Boyle is also a producer, alongside Tessa Ross, Michael Ellenberg and Tracey Seaward, with Alwin H. Küchler as director of photography.

In August 2025, Guy Pearce and Jack O'Connell joined the cast in the roles of Rupert Murdoch and Larry Lamb.

Principal photography began in London in October 2025, with additional scenes filmed in Saltaire, Yorkshire. That month, filming also took place in Hebden Bridge and Halifax, West Yorkshire. Claire Foy joined the cast in October.

The film uses an estimated 30 seconds of generative AI, including mice scurrying around on the newsroom floor and animated photographs.

== Release ==
Ink had its world premiere as the opening film at the 83rd Venice International Film Festival on 2 September 2026. It had its North American premiere at the 53rd Telluride Film Festival, and its UK premiere at the 70th BFI London Film Festival. It was also selected for the 2026 Toronto International Film Festival. It was programmed as a surprise film at the 74th San Sebastián International Film Festival.

In July 2026, Netflix acquired U.S. and Latin American distribution rights to the film.

The film is scheduled to be released in select theatres in the United States on 11 December 2026, before releasing on Netflix on 8 January 2027 in the United States and Latin America. StudioCanal will theatrically release the film in France on 6 January 2027, and in the United Kingdom and Ireland on 8 January. Wanda programmed a 6 January 2027 theatrical release in Spain.

== Reception ==
=== Critical response ===
On the review aggregator website Rotten Tomatoes, 73% of 66 critics' reviews are positive, with an average rating of 7/10. The website's consensus reads: "Capturing the amoral thrill of "if it bleeds, it leads" with all the stylistic prowess director Danny Boyle can marshal, Ink's is an erratic media indictment that's ably anchored by Jack O'Connell's superb performance." Metacritic, which uses a weighted average, assigned the film a score of 78 out of 100, based on 21 critics, indicating "generally favorable" reviews.

In a positive review David Rooney of The Hollywood Reporter described the film as "a rise-and-fall story, played with aggressive self-determination but not monomaniacal monstrousness by O’Connell", praising the film's nature in reporting "a chronicle of the degradation of what passes for news reporting".

British critic Peter Bradshaw gave the film 3 out of 5 stars in The Guardian, praising Jack O'Connell's performance, calling it "resoundingly tough and confident", finding, however, that "the film is perhaps unsure exactly how much prominence to give this horrible affair in the midst of the bleary, knowing and lenient black comedy that governs everything else", pointing out that "perhaps the kidnapping should occupy a more central dramatic position".

=== Accolades ===
Award	Date of ceremony	Category	Recipient(s)	Result	Ref.
Gotham Film Awards	30 November 2026	Director Tribute	Danny Boyle	Won	
Middleburg Film Festival	18 October 2026	Distinguished Composer Award	Daniel Pemberton (Note: Also for Project Hail Mary)	Honored	
Middleburg Film Festival	18 October 2026	Spotlight Actor Award	Jack O’Connell	Honored	
Montclair Film Festival	19 October 2026	Performer Award	Jack O’Connell	Honored	
Venice Film Festival	12 September 2026	Golden Lion	Danny Boyle	Nominated	
Venice Film Festival	12 September 2026	Soundtrack Stars Award – Special Prize	Daniel Pemberton	Won	
