= Cudlipp =

Cudlipp is a surname. Notable people with the surname include:

- Hugh Cudlipp (1913–1998), Welsh journalist and newspaper editor
- Jodi Cudlipp (née Hyland; 1913–1998), British journalist and magazine editor
- Percy Cudlipp (1905–1962), Welsh journalist
- Reg Cudlipp (1910–2005), Welsh newspaper editor
- Thelma Cudlipp (1891–1983), American artist and book illustrator
