= Donlan =

Donlan may refer to:

== Places ==
- Donlan, West Virginia

== People with the name Donlan ==
- C. Josh Donlan
- Gretchen Donlan
- James Donlan
- Kenneth Donlan
- Steve Donlan
- Stuart Donlan
- Yolande Donlan
