= Arthur Brittenden =

British newspaper editor

Charles Arthur Brittenden (23 October 1924 – 25 April 2015) was a British newspaper editor. A career journalist, he worked for Yorkshire Post, Daily Express and Daily Mail, before joining News International, where he helped to make The Sun the UK's top selling daily newspaper.

== Biography ==
Brittenden was born in Leeds on 23 October 1924. His father Tom Edwin Brittenden was a cashier at a wool mill and his mother was Caroline Margaret Scrivener. His father would die when Brittenden was two, and the following year his mother married engineer William Esam. Brittenden attended Leeds grammar school until the age of 16, where he joined the Yorkshire Post where he remained for ten years, with a break for national service.

Brittenden married three times, first to Sylvia Penelope Cadman in 1953, then in 1966 to Ann Patricia Kenny, the royal correspondent for The Daily Telegraph. His third marriage was on 24 October 1975, to Valerie Arnison, who he remained with until she died in 2002. Brittenden himself died on 25 April 2015 at the age of 90.

== Career ==
Upon leaving the Post, Brittenden spent six years at News Chronicle before joining Sunday Express, rising first to chief reporter then foreign editor in 1959. Three years later, in the early 1960s, he become Assistant Editor for the north of the Daily Express. In 1966, he moved to become Editor of the Daily Mail. He held the post until 1971, when the paper merged with the Daily Sketch, and he was replaced by Sketch editor David English. Brittenden later moved to News International, and from 1981 to 1987, he served as its Director of Corporate Relations. He worked with Larry Lamb and Bernard Shrimsley on making The Sun the UK's highest circulating daily newspaper. Rupert Murdoch, owner of The Sun, would put Brittenden in charge of corporate relations for News International during the Wapping dispute in 1981, before moving him to editorial manager for Times Newspapers until his retirement in 1987. After leaving the print industry, he went on to serve as a public relations consultant to Bell Pottinger.

Media offices
Preceded by ?	Deputy Editor of the Sunday Express; 1963–1964	Succeeded by ?
Preceded by Mike Randall	Editor of the Daily Mail; 1966–1971	Succeeded by David English
Preceded by Peter Stephens	Deputy Editor of The Sun; 1972–1981	Succeeded by ?
