= Reg Cudlipp =

British newspaper editor (1910–2005)

Reginald Cudlipp (11 December 1910 – 21 January 2005) was a British newspaper editor.

Cudlipp was born in Cardiff and was the second of three brothers. He followed his older brother, Percy, to become a journalist on the Penarth News, before joining the Western Mail as a sub-editor. In 1938, he became a sub-editor on the News of the World, based in London.

Cudlipp joined the Royal Artillery during World War II. He spent much of his time in the Army as associate editor of Phoenix Magazine. At the end of the war became the News of the World's New York City correspondent. He returned to London in 1948, and was promoted to become editor in 1953. Both Percy and his younger brother Hugh had already edited national newspapers.

As editor, Cudlipp maintained the paper's reputation for reporting on sex scandals and serialising romantic novels. However, circulation fell from eight million to six-and-a-half million copies per issue, and he resigned in 1959. In 1961, he became director of the Anglo-Japanese Economic Institute and edited Japan, its journal. He remained director until 1986, and in 1982 was the first Briton to be awarded the Order of the Sacred Treasure.

Media offices
Preceded by ?	Deputy Editor of the News of the World; 1950–1953	Succeeded by Stafford Somerfield?
Preceded by Arthur Waters	Editor of the News of the World; 1953–1959	Succeeded by Stafford Somerfield
