= Emsley Carr =

British newspaper editor

Carr in the c1930s.

Sir William Emsley Carr (1 May 1867 – 5 August 1941) was a British newspaper editor, who edited the News of the World for more than fifty years.

Carr was born and raised in the Hunslet district of Leeds. His uncle, Henry Lascelles Carr, was a founder and editor of the Western Mail, based in Cardiff, and he saw promise in Emsley, and summoned him to work as a journalist on the newspaper. In 1891, Lascelles Carr was part of a syndicate which purchased the News of the World, a London-based Sunday newspaper with a small circulation, and he decided to appoint his nephew as its new editor.

Emsley married Lascelles' daughter, Jenny Lascelles Carr, in 1895, and worked closely with George Riddell to build up sales of the News of the World. This was highly successful; by 1900, the paper was selling more than one million copies of each issue. Carr also continued to write for the Western Mail, acting as its chief political correspondent until the 1930s, using his membership of the Parliamentary lobby to obtain stories.

During World War I, Carr undertook extensive charity work, in support of captured Welsh soldiers. He also undertook several trips to see the war for himself, visiting France and Scapa Flow, and reporting on the Paris Peace Conference. In the 1918 New Year Honours, he was knighted for his wartime efforts.

After the war, the News of the World continued to gain sales, reaching more than four million by 1940. Carr served as High Sheriff of Glamorgan in 1938, as Chairman of the Press Gallery at Parliament in 1930/1, and President of the Institute of Journalists in 1932/3. He also sponsored various sporting events, the Emsley Carr Mile being named in his honour some years after his death. His son, Harry, was a cricketer who also worked alongside his father as a journalist at the News of the World.
