= Ink (play) =

2017 play by James Graham

- Original language: English
- Written by: James Graham
- Subject: The Sun
- Genre: Drama

Premiere
- Date: June 2017
- Place: Almeida Theatre

Ink is a 2017 play by James Graham. The play follows the controversial rise of the British tabloid newspaper The Sun following its purchase by Rupert Murdoch and its leadership under editor Larry Lamb.

Ink premiered on the West End at the Duke of York's Theatre in September 2017, before transferring to Broadway at the Samuel J. Friedman Theatre in April 2019. Rupert Goold was the director for both runs. For his performance as Murdoch in both the West End and Broadway runs, Bertie Carvel won the Laurence Olivier Award for Best Actor in a Supporting Role and the Tony Award for Best Featured Actor in a Play.

A film adaptation written by Graham and directed by Danny Boyle is scheduled to premiere on 11 December 2026 in the United States and 8 January 2027 in the United Kingdom.

== Plot ==
=== Act I ===
In October 1969, Australian businessman Rupert Murdoch is in negotiations to purchase the failing British daily newspaper The Sun from its parent paper The Mirror. He approaches the Daily Mail's Northern editor Larry Lamb and asks him to be the editor of The Sun for its re-launch. Lamb, a Yorkshire native and former sub-editor for The Mirror, is frustrated over his lack of progress in his career, which he attributes to his working-class background. Reluctantly, he accepts Murdoch's offer.

Murdoch and Lamb meet with Mirror chairman Hugh Cudlipp to finalise the sale. The contract stipulates that publication must continue uninterrupted after the handover, giving Lamb mere weeks to assemble the first issue. Cudlipp privately reveals to Lamb that he is selling The Sun (as opposed to shutting it down) only to avoid angering local unions. He expects the paper to fail and discourages Lamb from taking the job. Murdoch declares his intent to prioritise profits and proposes that Lamb strive to overtake sales of The Mirror within one year of the re-launch. Murdoch grants Lamb full freedom on the condition that he make the paper "loud", encouraging him to compete aggressively with other papers.

On Fleet Street, Lamb frantically recruits new staff members for The Sun, the former staff having been laid off or re-absorbed into The Mirror. While brainstorming with the new staff, Lamb designs the paper's new logo and proposes new features, several of which are blatant pastiches of The Mirror. He also hires Stephanie Rahn and other models to pose in lingerie for the paper.

At the London Press Club, Lamb encounters Cudlipp, who mocks The Sun's lowbrow content and attempts to copy The Mirror. Convinced that The Mirror does not reflect the mood or interests of common people, Lamb pushes the re-launch of The Sun in a more populist direction that includes frank discussions of sexuality, a television section, and weekly giveaways.

The evening before the re-launch, last-minute problems plague the staff, including a lack of enough "E" keys for the full headline and an interviewee's death. Murdoch and his wife Anna visit the office alongside his deputy Sir Alick McKay and his wife Muriel. A power outage delays printing and prevents that day's distribution in the north. Despite the limited distribution and rushed nature of the issue, the paper is an unprecedented success, worrying Cudlipp.

=== Act II ===
In a televised interview, Murdoch defends The Sun's outrageous content as a manifestation of the will of the masses. At a meeting, Lamb explains to Murdoch how the paper's newfound success has sown hostility in its competitors.

While the Murdochs are visiting Australia, Muriel is kidnapped for ransom. The staff realise that Anna Murdoch was the kidnappers' intended target; the mistake arose after they stalked a Rolls-Royce the Murdochs had lent to the McKays while they were in Australia. Lamb insists on covering the incident in The Sun and publishing the ransom notes, in doing so defying the wishes of his staff, union leaders, and Murdoch himself. Two brothers are arrested for Muriel's abduction and presumed murder. The Sun is widely criticised for its treatment of the tragedy, though sales surge. In a last-ditch effort to take down The Sun, Cudlipp offers to make Lamb editor of The Mirror, but he refuses.

As the one-year anniversary of The Sun's re-launch approaches, sales remain behind that of The Mirror. Lamb asks Rahn to secretly pose for a fully-nude photo shoot, to be printed on Page 3 of The Sun. After some discussion, Rahn consents. The anniversary issue sparks public outrage, ruins Rahn's reputation, and infuriates Murdoch, but successfully outsells The Mirror. Conceding defeat, Cudlipp begins planning his retirement.

Despite his own disapproval and Lamb's reservations, Murdoch allows the Page 3 feature to continue. At a dinner with Lamb, Murdoch proposes that The Sun start appealing to the new conservative government, confident that the paper has the power to sway public opinion. He also tells Lamb his plans to purchase an American television network and relocate The Sun's office off of Fleet Street. He concludes the dinner saying, "People like stories." Lamb imagines that Murdoch will outlive him and someday publish his obituary in The Sun.

== Productions ==
=== Off-West End (2017) ===
Directed by Rupert Goold, the play began previews at the Almeida Theatre on 17 June 2017, with an official opening night on 27 June. It played a limited run to 5 August. The cast included Bertie Carvel as Rupert Murdoch and Richard Coyle as the editor of The Sun, Larry Lamb. Reviews were generally favorable.

=== West End (2017) ===
The production transferred to the West End at the Duke of York's Theatre, again led by Carvel and Coyle, officially opening on 19 September 2017 following previews from 9 September. It concluded its run on 6 January 2018.

=== Broadway (2019) ===
The play made its Broadway premiere on 2 April 2019 (previews), officially on 24 April 2019, produced by the Manhattan Theatre Club at the Samuel J. Friedman Theatre. Bertie Carvel reprised his role as Murdoch and Jonny Lee Miller played Larry Lamb. Rupert Goold returned as director. The play closed on 7 July 2019. According to Graham, Rupert Murdoch saw the play in both its West End and Broadway runs, though Graham said that Murdoch was "very good at sort of not really giving anything away" as a reaction.

== Cast and characters ==
Character	Off-West End	West End	Broadway
Character	2017		2019
Rupert Murdoch	Bertie Carvel	Bertie Carvel	Bertie Carvel
Larry Lamb	Richard Coyle	Richard Coyle	Jonny Lee Miller

== Reception ==
Michael Billington of The Guardian gave the West End production four out of five stars, writing that it "fairly whizzes along and captures the dizzy excitement of the hot metal era" and "[W]hat makes this such a good and gripping piece of theatre is that it doesn’t preach us sermons about press ethics but leaves us to draw our own conclusions from the known facts." Susannah Clapp was similarly positive in her review, singling out Carvel's performance for praise. Matt Trueman of Variety noted how the production used tabloid tactics in its storytelling.

Reviewing the Broadway production, The Hollywood Reporter's David Rooney praised the play's resonance with modern audiences and energy, but criticized tonal inconsistencies in the second act. He wrote, "Everything from editorial content to headline-writing to layout and even distribution is depicted with rollicking energy and humor." Ben Brantley of The New York Times praised the cast, writing that, "The show’s most potent chemistry is, as it should be, between Mr. Miller’s Lamb, as he becomes increasingly drunk on the thrill of success at all costs, and Mr. Carvel’s exquisitely manipulative Murdoch."

== Awards and nominations ==
=== Original London production ===
Year	Award	Category	Nominee	Result
2017	Evening Standard Theatre Award	Best Play		Nominated
2017	Evening Standard Theatre Award	Best Actor	Bertie Carvel	Nominated
2017	Evening Standard Theatre Award	Best Design	Bunny Christie	Nominated
2018	Laurence Olivier Award	Best New Play		Nominated
2018	Laurence Olivier Award	Best Actor in a Supporting Role	Bertie Carvel	Won
2018	Laurence Olivier Award	Best Director	Rupert Goold	Nominated
2018	Laurence Olivier Award	Best Set Design	Bunny Christie	Nominated

=== Original Broadway production ===
Year	Award	Category	Nominee	Result
2019	Tony Awards	Best Play		Nominated
2019	Tony Awards	Best Performance by an Actor in a Featured Role in a Play	Bertie Carvel	Won
2019	Tony Awards	Best Direction of a Play	Rupert Goold	Nominated
2019	Tony Awards	Best Scenic Design of a Play	Bunny Christie	Nominated
2019	Tony Awards	Best Lighting Design of a Play	Neil Austin	Won
2019	Tony Awards	Best Sound Design of a Play	Adam Cork	Nominated
2019	Outer Critics Circle Awards	Outstanding New Broadway Play		Nominated
2019	Outer Critics Circle Awards	Outstanding Director of a Play	Rupert Goold	Nominated
2019	Outer Critics Circle Awards	Outstanding Set Design	Bunny Christie	Nominated
2019	Outer Critics Circle Awards	Outstanding Lighting Design	Neil Austin	Nominated
2019	Outer Critics Circle Awards	Outstanding Featured Actor in a Play	Bertie Carvel	Nominated

== Film adaptation ==
In August 2025, Deadline Hollywood reported that Danny Boyle would direct a film adaptation of the play with James Graham returning as the screenwriter. Guy Pearce and Jack O'Connell are set to portray Murdoch and Lamb respectively. Filming began in October.
