= Gordon McKenzie =

Gordon McKenzie may refer to:

- Gordon McKenzie (athlete) (1927–2013), American athlete
- Gordon McKenzie (journalist) (1917–1998), British journalist and editor
- Gordon Mackenzie (1937–2014), American baseball player, manager, coach and scout
