= Mail Men: The Unauthorized Story of the Daily Mail =

2017 history book by Adrian Addison

- Author: Adrian Addison
- Language: English
- Genre: History
- Publisher: Atlantic Books
- ISBN: 978 1 78239 970 4

Mail Men: The Unauthorized Story of the Daily Mail is a history book written by Adrian Addison and published by Atlantic Books in 2017. It covers the history of the Daily Mail newspaper, from its original creation through to the modern day. It largely focuses on the figures behind the paper, such as Lord Northcliffe, Sir David English and Paul Dacre.

== Reception ==
The Irish Times found that there was "not a lot new to see here" in regards to the paper's early days, but was overall quite positive, highlighting the anecdotes rather than the overarching narrative as the key strength of the book. The Guardian, while noting that the earlier parts of the book featured "nothing much worth the 'unauthorised' tag", concluded that it was a "rollicking, often compelling account". The Dublin-based Hot Press criticised the earlier parts of the book as "quite tedious", but found the coverage of Paul Dacre's editorship "riveting" and concluded that it was "undoubtedly one of the non-fiction books of the year".
