= Bristol Channel =

Large inlet to the river Severn in southwest Great Britain

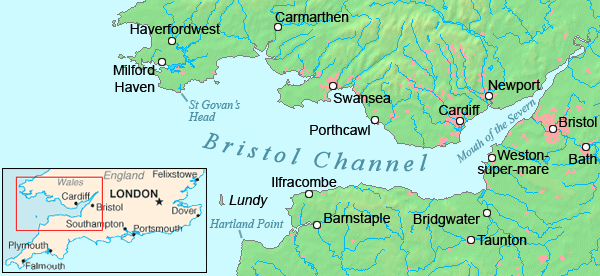

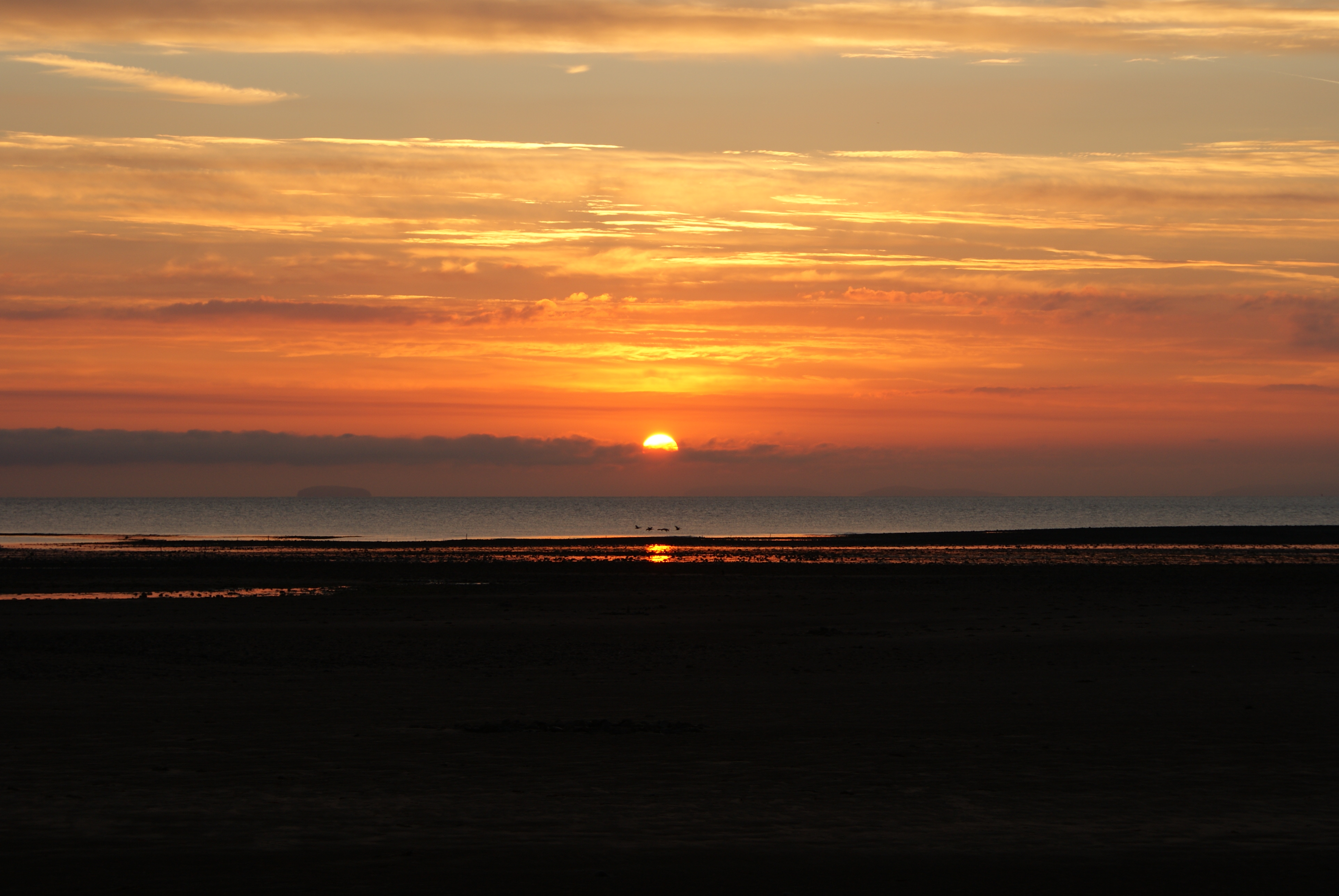
Sunrise viewed from Minehead, showing Steep Holm and Brean Down

The Bristol Channel (Welsh: Môr Hafren, lit. 'Severn Sea') is a major inlet in the island of Great Britain, separating South Wales (from Pembrokeshire to the Vale of Glamorgan) and South West England (from Devon to North Somerset). It extends from the smaller Severn Estuary of the River Severn (Welsh: Afon Hafren) to the North Atlantic Ocean. It takes its name from the English city and port of Bristol.

Long stretches of both sides of the coastline are designated as Heritage Coast. These include Exmoor, Bideford Bay, the Hartland Point peninsula, Lundy Island, Glamorgan, Gower Peninsula, Carmarthenshire, South Pembrokeshire and Caldey Island.

Until Tudor times the Bristol Channel was known as the Severn Sea, and it is still known as this in both Welsh: Môr Hafren and Cornish: Mor Havren.

== Geography ==
The International Hydrographic Organization (IHO) defines the offshore western limit of the Bristol Channel as "a line joining Hartland Point in Devon (51°01′N 4°32′W) to St. Govan's Head in Pembrokeshire (51°36′N 4°55′W)". Western and northern Pembrokeshire, north Cornwall and that part of Devon west of Hartland Point are outside the IHO defined limits of the Bristol Channel, and are considered part of the seaboard of the Atlantic Ocean, specifically the Celtic Sea. Lundy lies on the boundary between the Bristol Channel and the Atlantic. In common usage, the distinction between the Bristol Channel and Celtic Sea is less clearly defined, with the name Bristol Channel sometimes applied to areas of the Celtic Sea.

Upstream, the distinction between the Bristol Channel and Severn Estuary is more ambiguous, with no official boundary between them. Some sources consider the Bristol Channel to encompass the estuary, or draw no distinction between them. The Severn Estuary Partnership encompasses an area upstream of Hurlstone Point and Nash Point, while the Living Levels Partnership draw the line between Lavernock Point and Sand Point, marked by Steep Holm and Flat Holm islands. Lavernock Point is also used as the boundary between Marine Character Areas 28 and 29, named Bristol Channel and Severn Estuary. In common usage, the term Bristol Channel is often applied to areas upstream of these lines.

The Bristol Channel–Severn Estuary system extends eastward inland to the limit of tidal influence, at Gloucester Docks. The channel shoreline alternates between resistant and erosional cliff features, interspersed with depositional beaches backed by coastal sand dunes; in the Severn Estuary, a low-lying shoreline is fronted by extensive intertidal mudflats. The Severn Estuary and most of the embayments around the channel are less than 30 ft (9 m) deep. Within the channel, however, there is an east–west valley 65–100 ft (20–30 m) deep, which is thought to have been formed by fluvial run-off during Pleistocene phases of lower sea level. Along the margins of the Bristol Channel are extensive linear tidal sandbanks, which are dredged for aggregates. In the outer Bristol Channel, off the Welsh coast, are the OBel Sands, an extensive area of sand waves up to 62 ft (19 m) high, covering more than 400 mi^{2} (1,036 km^{2})).

== Ecology ==
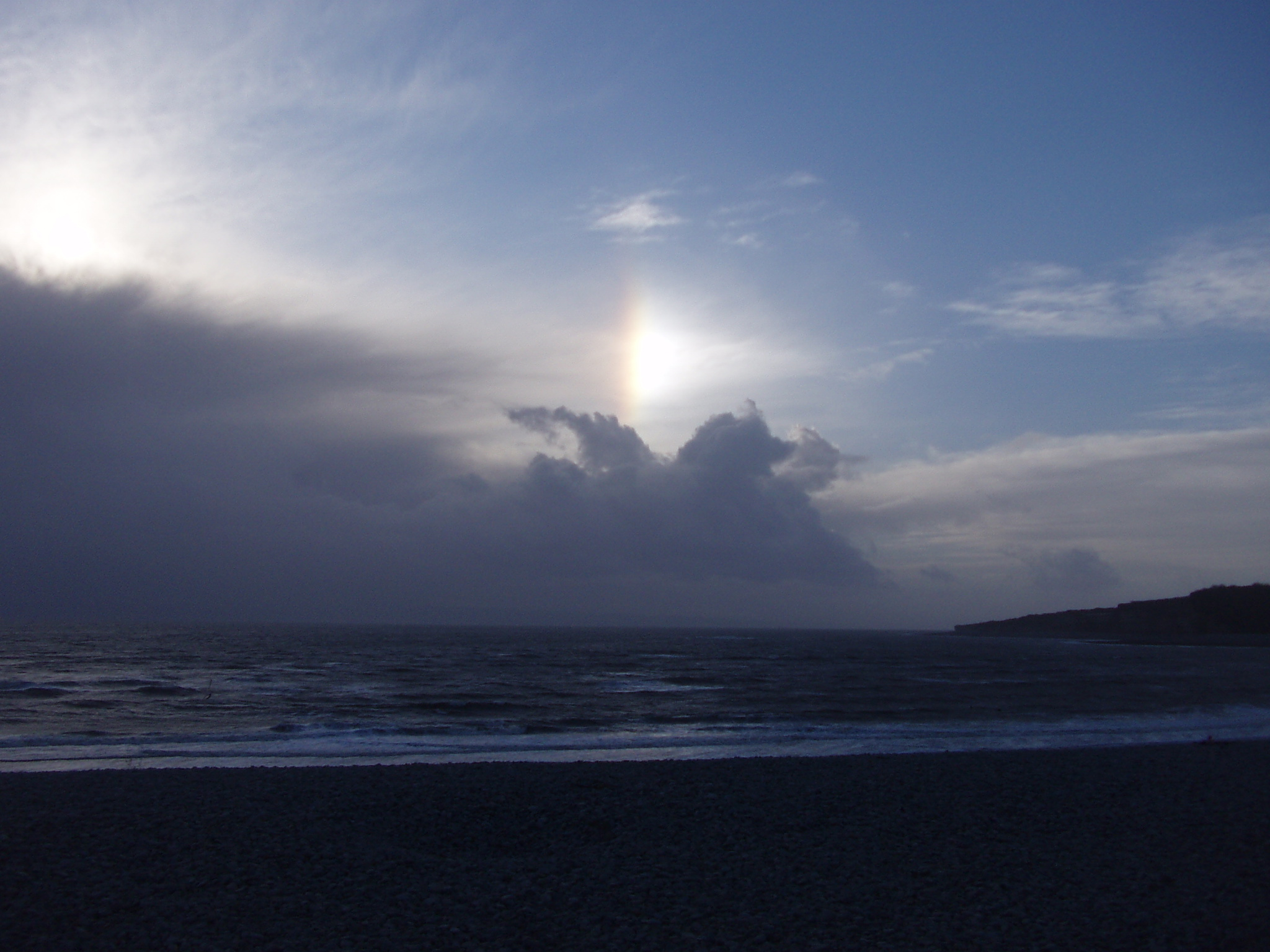
The channel as seen from Barry, Wales

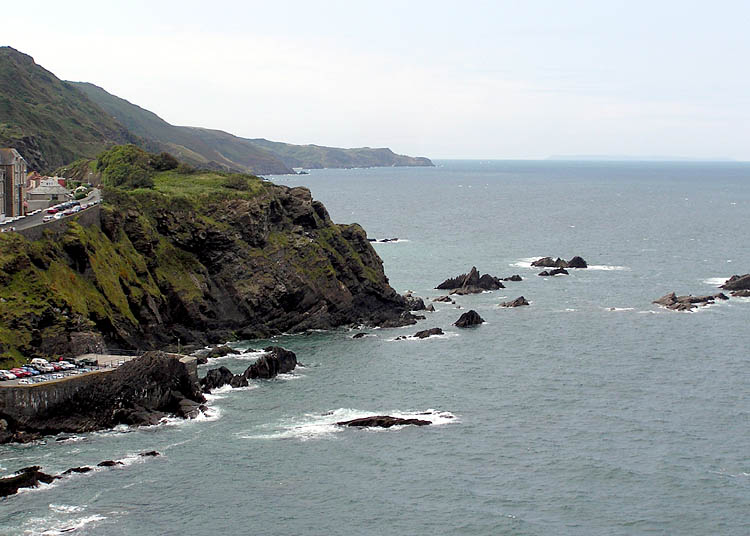
The Bristol Channel coast at Ilfracombe, North Devon, looking west towards Lee Bay, with Lundy in the distance

The Bristol Channel is an important area for wildlife, in particular waders, and has protected areas, including national nature reserves such as Bridgwater Bay at the mouth of the River Parrett. At low tide large parts of the channel become mud flats due to the tidal range of 43 ft (13 m), frequently stated to be second only to the Bay of Fundy in Eastern Canada but smaller than those at Ungava Bay, also in Canada. Development schemes have been proposed along the channel, including an airport and a tidal barrier for electricity generation, but conservation issues have so far managed to block such schemes.

The largest islands in the Bristol Channel are Lundy, Steep Holm and Flat Holm, which are mostly uninhabited and protected as nature reserves, and are home to some unique wild flower species. In 1971 a proposal was made by the Lundy Field Society to establish a marine reserve. Provision for the establishment of statutory Marine Nature Reserves was included in the Wildlife and Countryside Act 1981, and on 21 November 1986 the Secretary of State for the Environment announced the designation of a statutory reserve at Lundy. There is an outstanding variety of marine habitats and wildlife, and a large number of rare and unusual species in the waters around Lundy, including some species of seaweed, branching sponges, sea fans and cup corals.

The Bristol Channel has some extensive and popular beaches and spectacular scenery, particularly on the coasts of Exmoor and Bideford Bay in North Devon and the Vale of Glamorgan and Gower Peninsula on the Glamorgan coast. The western stretch of Exmoor boasts Hangman cliffs, the highest cliffs in mainland Britain, culminating near Combe Martin in the "Great Hangman", a 1,043 ft (318 m) 'hog-backed' hill with a cliff-face of 820 ft (250 m); its sister cliff the "Little Hangman" has a cliff-face of 716 ft (218 m). On the Gower Peninsula, at its western extremity is the Worms Head, a headland of Carboniferous Limestone which is approachable on foot at low tide only. The beaches of Gower (at Rhossili, for example) and North Devon, such as Croyde and Woolacombe, win awards for their water quality and setting, as well as being renowned for surfing. In 2004, The Times "Travel" magazine selected Barafundle Bay in Pembrokeshire as one of the twelve best beaches in the world. In 2007, Oxwich Bay made the same magazine's Top 12 best beaches in the world list, and was also selected as Britain's best beach for 2007.

== Coastal cities and towns ==
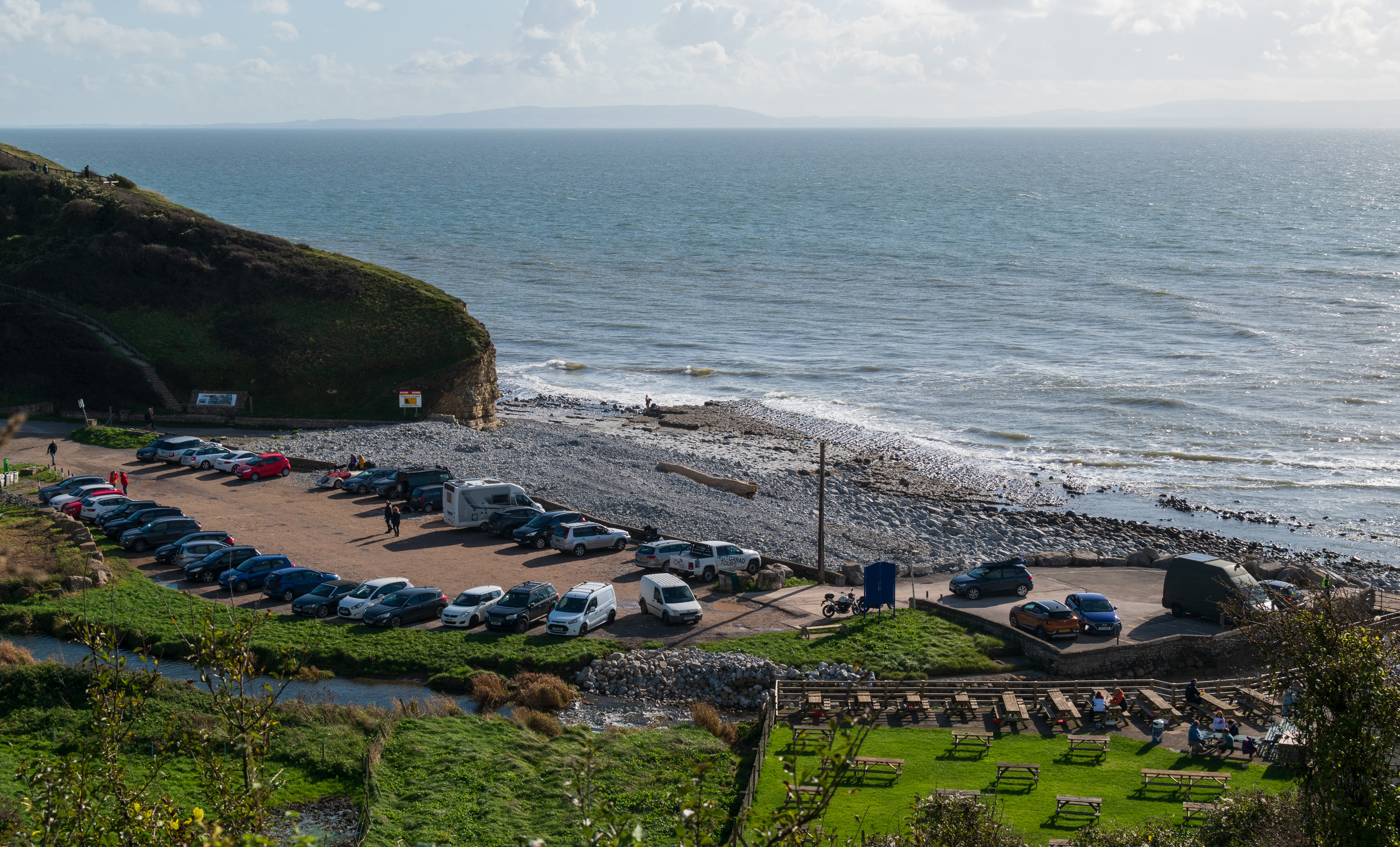
The Bristol Channel looking south from Llantwit Major near Barry on the Glamorgan coast

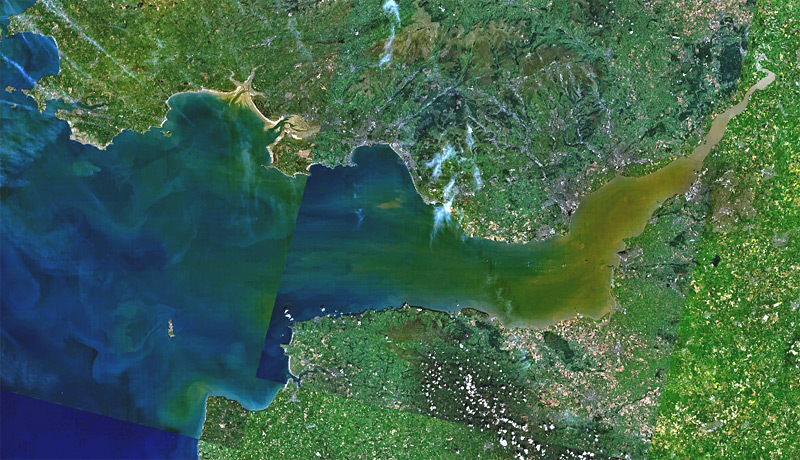
Satellite view of the Bristol Channel

The city of Swansea is the largest settlement on the Welsh coast of the Bristol Channel. Other major built-up areas include Barry (including Barry Island), Port Talbot and Llanelli. Smaller resort towns include Porthcawl, Mumbles, Saundersfoot and Tenby. The cities of Cardiff and Newport adjoin the Severn estuary.

On the English side, the resort towns of Weston-super-Mare, Burnham-on-Sea, Watchet, Minehead and Ilfracombe are located on the Bristol Channel. Barnstaple and Bideford are sited on estuaries opening onto Bideford Bay, at the westernmost end of the Bristol Channel. Within the Severn Estuary, are Clevedon, Portishead and the city of Bristol. The Port of Bristol, originally established inland on the River Avon in the centre of the city, but now with larger commercial deep water docks on the Severn Estuary, is one of the busiest ports in Britain.

== Navigation ==
There are no road or rail crossings of the Bristol Channel so direct crossings are necessarily made by sea or air, or less directly by the road and rail crossings of the Severn estuary. The Channel can be a hazardous area of water because of its strong tides and the rarity of havens on the north Devon and Somerset coasts that can be entered in all states of the tide. Because of the treacherous waters, pilotage is an essential service for shipping. A specialised style of sailing boat, the Bristol Channel Pilot Cutter, developed in the area.

=== Paddle steamers ===
P & A Campbell, based in Bristol, was the main operator of pleasure craft, particularly paddle steamers, from the mid-19th century to the late 1970s, together with the Barry Railway Company. These served harbours along both coasts, such as Ilfracombe and Weston-super-Mare.

This tradition is continued each summer by the PS Waverley, the last seagoing paddle steamer in the world, built in 1947. The steamer provides pleasure trips between the Welsh and English coasts and to the islands of the channel. Trips are also offered on the MV Balmoral, also owned by Waverley Excursions.

=== Marine rescue services ===
The Burnham-on-Sea Area Rescue Boat (BARB) uses a hovercraft to rescue people from the treacherous mud flats on that part of the coast. A hovercraft was recently tested to determine the feasibility of setting up a similar rescue service in Weston-super-Mare. There are also RNLI lifeboats stationed along both sides of the Channel. In the Severn Estuary, in-shore rescue is provided by two independent lifeboat trusts, the Severn Area Rescue Association (SARA) and the Portishead and Bristol Lifeboat Trust.

== Renewable energy ==
The Bristol Channel and Severn Estuary have the potential to generate more renewable electricity than any other in the UK. It has been stated that it would contribute significantly to UK climate change goals and European Union renewable energy targets. Earlier studies of a possible Severn Barrage included estimates of bed load transport of sand and gravel by tidal ebb and flood that would be interrupted if a solid dam were built across the Channel. More recently, the Severn Tidal Power Feasibility Study was launched in 2008 by the British Government to assess all tidal range technologies, including barrages, lagoons and others. The study will look at the costs, benefits and impacts of a Severn tidal power scheme and will help Government decide whether it could or could not support such a scheme. Some of the options being looked at may include a road crossing downstream of the existing crossings of the estuary.

== 1607 flood ==
On 30 January 1607 (New style) thousands of people were drowned, houses and villages swept away, farmland inundated and flocks destroyed when a flood hit the shores of the Channel. The devastation was particularly bad on the Welsh side, from Laugharne in Carmarthenshire to above Chepstow on the English border. Cardiff was the most badly affected town. There remain plaques up to 8 ft (2.4 m) above sea level to show how high the waters rose on the sides of the surviving churches. It was commemorated in a contemporary pamphlet "God's warning to the people of England by the great overflowing of the waters or floods."

The cause of the flood is uncertain and disputed. It had long been believed that the floods were caused by a combination of meteorological extremes and tidal peaks, but research published in 2002 showed some evidence of a tsunami in the Channel. Although some evidence from the time describes events similar to a tsunami, there are also similarities to descriptions of the 1953 floods in East Anglia, which were caused by a storm surge. It has been shown that the tide and weather at the time were capable of generating such a surge.

== Religion ==
In 1835 John Ashley was on the shore at Clevedon with his son who asked him how the people on Flat Holm could go to church. For the next three months Ashley voluntarily ministered to the population of the island. From there he recognised the needs of the seafarers on the four hundred sailing vessels in the Bristol Channel and created the Bristol Channel Mission. He raised funds and in 1839 a specially designed mission cutter was built with a main cabin which could be converted into a chapel for 100 people; this later became first initiative of the Mission to Seafarers.

== Recreation ==
=== Surfing ===
Much of the coastline at the western end of the Bristol Channel faces west towards the Atlantic Ocean. The heritage coasts of the Vale of Glamorgan, Bideford Bay and Gower are, along with the Atlantic coasts of Pembrokeshire and Cornwall, prominent areas for surfing across the whole of Britain. Although overshadowed by the Atlantic coasts of North Cornwall and West Pembrokeshire, both Gower and Bideford Bay have several breaks, notably Croyde in Bideford Bay and Langland Bay on Gower.

=== Windsurfing across the channel ===
The first known crossing of the Bristol Channel (from Swansea to Woody Bay, near Lynton, Devon) by a windsurfer was Adam Cowles in April 2006, apparently accidentally. Other windsurfers have reported making the crossing as a training exercise (Hugh Sim Williams) or as part of a windsurf around Britain (e.g. Jono Dunnett). The coastguard has stated that windsurf crossings of the channel are dangerous and should not be attempted without appropriate preparations.

=== Walking ===
The high quality of the landscape of much of both coasts of the Bristol Channel means that they are popular destinations for walkers. Sections of two national trails; the South West Coast Path and the Pembrokeshire Coast Path follow these shores, and the West Somerset Coast Path extends eastwards from the South West Coast Path to the mouth of the River Parrett. A continuous coastal path, the Wales Coast Path, was opened in May 2012 along the entire Welsh shore under the auspices of the Countryside Council for Wales.

=== Swimming records ===
==== First person to swim across the Bristol Channel ====
The first person to swim across the Bristol Channel was Kathleen Thomas, a 21-year-old woman from Penarth who swam to Weston-super-Mare on 5 September 1927. She completed the swim, nominally 11 miles but equivalent to 22 miles because of tidal flows, in 7 hours 20 minutes. In 2007 the achievement was marked by a plaque on the seafront at Penarth. There is also a plaque at Anchor Head in Weston-super-Mare.

==== Youngest person to swim across the Bristol Channel ====
In 1929, Edith Parnell, a 16-year-old schoolgirl, emulated Kathleen Thomas's swim from Penarth to Weston-super-Mare in 10 hours 15 minutes. Edith later became the first wife of Hugh Cudlipp the Welsh journalist and newspaper editor.

==== Ilfracombe to Swansea ====
The first person to swim the 30.5 nmi (56.5 km; 35.1 mi) from Ilfracombe to Swansea was Gethin Jones, who achieved the record on 13 September 2009, taking nearly 22 hours.

==== Penarth to Clevedon ====
The youngest person to swim from Penarth to Clevedon is Gary Carpenter, who in August 2007 at the age of 17, completed the crossing in 5 hours 35 minutes. He held the record for the fastest swim across the Bristol Channel until 2020. Carpenter's coach, Steve Price, was the first person to swim from Penarth to Clevedon, in 1990. In 2020 Joanne Jones swam from Penarth to Clevedon in a time of 5 hours, 27 minutes. Joanne was the first woman to swim this route, and holds the current record for fastest time.
