= Edith Parnell =

Welsh swimmer and journalist (1913–1938)

- Born: 1913; Penarth, Vale of Glamorgan, Wales
- Died: 13 November 1938 (aged 24–25); London, England
- Occupation: Journalist
- Known for: Youngest person to swim across the Bristol Channel (1929)

Edith Parnell (1913 – 13 November 1938), known to friends as Bunny, was a Welsh swimmer and journalist. In 1929 she became the youngest known person to swim across the Bristol Channel.

== Early life and the Bristol Channel ==
Edith Gertrude Parnell was the daughter of Mr and Mrs F. R. Parnell of Penarth.

In 1928, Parnell was already known as a distance swimmer, supporting other young women on attempts to cross the Bristol Channel. On 15 August 1929, at age 16, she became the second person to swim the Bristol Channel, swimming from Penarth to Weston-super-Mare in 10 hours, 15 minutes. She remains the youngest person ever to have made the crossing.

== Journalism and advertising ==
She later became the first woman reporter for the Reuters News Agency in Paris and London, and the first woman editor of a Sunday newspaper. She was later editorial manager of Higham's advertising agency. She handled publicity for Higham clients, including Coty, Imperial Chemical Industries, and the "Bread for Energy" campaign. She attended a convention of the Advertising Federation in Boston in 1936, and was the only woman delegate at the convention, representing the London-based Regent Advertising Club. She also spoke to the Rotary Club of Montreal in 1936, on the topic "Public Relations from a Woman's Standpoint."

== Personal life ==
Parnell married the Welsh journalist Hugh Cudlipp in April 1936, though the marriage was not a success. She was simultaneously in love with Tom Darlow, editor of John Bull, and kept up an affair with him. She died on 13 November 1938, aged 25 years, after complications from a Caesarean section in a Harley Street clinic.

Parnell's story partly inspired the novel Wonder Girls (2012) by Catherine Jones.
