= Eileen Ascroft =

British journalist and writer (1914–1962)

Eileen Ascroft (1914 – 29 April 1962) was a British journalist and writer.

Ascroft worked as a journalist at the Daily Mirror, where she met her second husband, Hugh Cudlipp; the couple married in 1945. (Her first husband was the film director Alexander Mackendrick.)

In her book about Cudlipp, Newspapermen, Ruth Dudley Edwards describes Ascroft as "blonde, talented and ambitious". Ascroft was sacked from the Mirror by the Editorial Director, Harry Guy Bartholomew, for using his oak office door as a dartboard.

Ascroft was responsible for starting the women's page at the Evening Standard. She and Hugh went on to become the most powerful couple on Fleet Street: "The combined power of Mr and Mrs Cudlipp over the livelihoods of hundreds, maybe thousands, of newspaper men and woman [sic], even benevolently exercised as they have always been, are going to be immense and terrifying". According to an obituary notice in The Times, "she could also pilot an aeroplane, having learnt to do so in an idle spell in Australia".

Ascroft died in April 1962, aged 47. At an inquest, her death was ruled to accidental, from an unintended overdose of sleeping pills. Her book, The Magic Key to Charm (1938), is a collection of her journalism for women published by the Mirror.
