= Henry Lascelles Carr =

British businessman (1841–1902)

- Born: Henry Lascelles Carr; 1841; Knottingley, England
- Died: 5 October 1902 (aged 60–61); Hyères, France
- Citizenship: British
- Education: St Aiden's Anglican College; Kingswood School, Bath
- Occupations: Journalist and newspaper proprietor
- Board member of: Royal Hotel Company
- Spouses: Mary Ann; Helen Jackson
- Children: Loftus Lascelles Carr; Ettie Carr, Jennie Carr, Mattie Carr
- Parent: Rev James B Carr and
- Relatives: Emsley Carr (son in law and nephew)

Henry Lascelles Carr (1841 – 5 October 1902), known as Lascelles Carr, was a British newspaper proprietor and businessman. Born in Yorkshire, Carr relocated to South Wales where he became a journalist. Carr became editor of the Western Mail and later its owner, before buying the London-based News of the World. Carr was also the Chairman of the Cardiff-based Royal Hotel Company and was a city councillor.

== Career ==
Carr was born in the town of Knottingley, Yorkshire in 1841 a son of Reverend James B. Carr, a Wesleyan minister. He was educated at Kingswood School in Bath, and as an adult trained firstly as an accountant before spending a single year at Richmond College where he served as the editor of the college magazine. From Richmond he entered St Aidan's Anglican training College, but upon graduating Carr decided to follow a path as a journalist rather than entering the priesthood. He then worked for a few years as a journalist for the Liverpool Daily Post. By 1869 Carr was living in Wales, and when John Crichton-Stuart, 3rd Marquess of Bute founded the Western Mail in Cardiff that year, he made Carr its first sub-editor. The 1871 Census records Carr as living in Roath while married to Mary Ann Carr, who had been born in County Westmeath, Ireland; they had a single child, Loftus Lascelles, a son aged six, who had been born in Dublin.

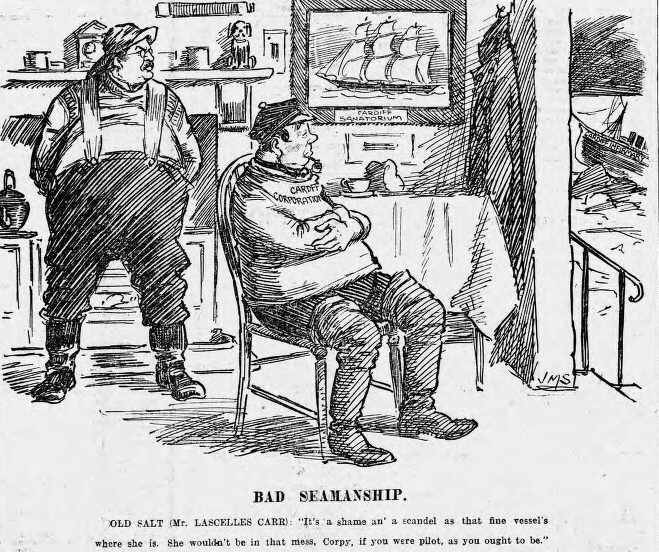
Carr making an editorial opinion in a Western Mail cartoon by J. M. Staniforth

In 1877 Lord Bute sold the Western Mail to Carr and Daniel Owen. By 1881, Carr had remarried, to Helen sister of Sir Charles James Jackson, and the 1881 Census records that they had three daughters. In 1884, Carr and Owen formed the Daniel Owen and Co. Ltd as a joint stock company.

As well as his work in the press, Carr served as a town councillor of Cardiff (for the West ward) and as a Justice of the Peace.

In 1891 Carr, as part of a syndicate, bought the London Sunday paper, News of the World and placed his nephew Emsley Carr as its editor. Emsley would later marry Carr's eldest daughter, Jenny. Around this period Carr branched into the hotel business, becoming Chairman of the Royal Hotel Company, which owned the Royal Hotel on St Mary's Street in the centre of Cardiff.

On the night of Saturday 3 June 1893 the premises of the Western Mail burnt to the ground, but Carr managed to set up an office and printing presses overnight in nearby Newport, which allowed the paper to report its own fire in the Monday morning edition.

Ill health caused Carr to retire as editor of the Western Mail in 1901. He died on 5 October 1902 aged 62 while staying in Hyères in the south of France.

His eldest daughter, Ettie, organised a Christmas 'feast' for poor children in Cardiff. The first was in 1893 in Park Hall, Cardiff for 1000 children up to the age of 12. As well as a meal with musical entertainment, the children were given gifts of food, toys, 3 pennies and clothes to take away that had partly been donated by the public and partly bought from donated money. Tickets for attendance were available from religious leaders and charity workers and the event was always very over-subscribed. The numbers increased so that in later years the event lasted for 2 days, one for 1000 girls and one for 1000 boys. The organisation was successively taken on by Ettie's younger sisters Jennie and Mattie as each got married. These feasts ended by the start of the 20th century.
