= Arthur Waters =

British newspaper editor (1888–1953)

Arthur George Waters (27 February 1888 – 17 November 1953) was a British newspaper editor.

Waters grew up in Barry, Vale of Glamorgan, and began his career in journalism with the Barry Dock News. He subsequently became a sub-editor at the Western Mail and the Evening Express in Cardiff, then joined the News of the World in 1914. He gradually rose through the ranks, and was appointed as editor of the paper in 1947, serving until his sudden and unexpected death in 1953. By then, the newspaper was selling more than 8,000,000 copies per issue.
