= Mike Randall (journalist) =

British newspaper editor

Michael Bennett Randall (12 August 1919 – 10 December 1999), known as Mike Randall, was a British newspaper editor.

== Life ==
Randall was educated at St Peter's School, Seaford, and Canford School.

He worked as a shipping clerk in Brazil in his youth, then returned to the United Kingdom at the start of the Second World War and took a job as a journalist at the Daily Sketch. In 1941, he moved to the Sunday Graphic, rising to become its editor in 1953. However, he soon left to become an assistant features editor with the Daily Mirror, and in 1956 moved on to the News Chronicle. This paper merged with the Daily Mail, when Randall joined the Mail, and he became its editor in 1963, after serving as deputy editor.

Randall aimed to take the Mail upmarket, introducing more investigative journalism and attract younger readers with a more liberal position. However, the paper lost readers, and Randall was replaced as editor in 1966 while he was on sick leave. He joined the Sunday Times as Managing Editor (News), assisting Editor Harold Evans and co-ordinating investigations. In 1969, Robert Maxwell asked Randall to edit The Sun if he was successful in purchasing it, but the deal did not go ahead, and Randall instead retired from the Sunday Times in 1979.

In semi-retirement, Randall worked as a fruit picker and on a mushroom farm, while involving himself in the launch of the Sunday Standard.

Media offices
Preceded by Philip Brownrigg	Editor of the Sunday Graphic; 1953	Succeeded by Gordon McKenzie
Preceded by William Hardcastle	Editor of the Daily Mail; 1963–1966	Succeeded by Arthur Brittenden
