= Peter Stephens (journalist) =

Peter Norman Stuart Stephens (19 December 1927 – 27 August 2016) was a British journalist and newspaper editor.

Stephens grew up in Nottingham, where he attended the Mundella Grammar School. He became a journalist at the end of World War II, working successively at the Newark Advertiser, the Northern Echo, the Daily Dispatch and the Daily Mirror, then in 1957 becoming assistant editor of the Newcastle Journal. In 1962, he moved to become assistant editor of the Evening Chronicle, being made editor in 1962, then editor of the Newcastle Journal in 1966. In 1970, he moved to London to become assistant editor of The Sun, briefly serving as deputy editor before moving to the News of the World in 1973, where he was associate editor for a year, then editor from 1974 to 1975. He then finished his career as associate editor of The Sun until 1981.

In retirement, Stephens wrote several books on the history of Newark, Nottinghamshire, and an autobiography, P. S. on a life in newspapers.

Media offices
Preceded by Bernard Shrimsley	Deputy Editor of The Sun; 1973	Succeeded by Arthur Brittenden
Preceded by Cyril Lear	Editor of the News of the World; 1974–1975	Succeeded by Bernard Shrimsley
