= Tracey Seaward =

English film producer

- Born: 1965 (age 60–61); Willerby, East Riding of Yorkshire, England
- Occupation: Film producer
- Years active: 1992—

Tracey Seaward (born 1965) is an English film producer.

Seaward was educated at Wolfreton School and Hull College, before studying film and cultural studies at Trinity College, Leeds. She has produced the Stephen Frears-directed films Dirty Pretty Things (2002), Mrs Henderson Presents (2005), The Queen (2006), Chéri (2009) and Tamara Drewe (2010). The Queen was awarded the BAFTA Award for Best Film in 2007, which Seaward shared with the other two producers.

In 2008 Seaward was presented with an honorary degree from the University of Hull.

In 2012 Seaward was the Producer of the Summer Olympics opening ceremony in London.

== Filmography ==
- 1968. Szczesliwego Nowego Roku (1992) — Assistant producer
- Widows' Peak (1994) — Co-producer
- Nothing Personal (1995) — Producer
- The Serpent's Kiss (1997) — Co-producer
- Babymother (1998) — Co-producer
- eXistenZ (1999) — Head of production
- Nora (2000) — Producer
- Dirty Pretty Things (2002) — Producer
- The Good Thief (2002) — Co-producer
- Millions (2004) — Co-producer
- The Constant Gardener (2005) — Co-producer
- Mrs Henderson Presents (2005) — Line producer
- The Queen (2006) — Producer
- Eastern Promises (2007) — Producer
- Chéri (2009) — Producer
- Tamara Drewe (2010) — Producer
- War Horse (2011) — Co-producer
- Isles of Wonder (2012) — Co-executive producer
- Happy and Glorious (2012) — Co-executive producer
- Philomena (2013) — Producer
- Genius (2016) — Co-producer
- Florence Foster Jenkins (2016)
- Victoria & Abdul (2017)
- The Two Popes (2019)
- Ink (2027)

== Awards ==
- 2003 — Alexander Korda Award for Best British Film, Dirty Pretty Things (Nominated)
- 2003 — European Film Award, Dirty Pretty Things (Nominated)
- 2007 — BAFTA Award for Best Film, The Queen (Won)
- 2007 — Alexander Korda Award for Best British Film, The Queen (Nominated)
- 2007 — Academy Award for Best Film, The Queen (Nominated)
- 2007 — PGA Award for Motion Picture Producer of the Year, The Queen (Nominated)
