= News of the World =

British tabloid newspaper (1843–2011)

- Front page of the final issue
- Type: Weekly newspaper
- Format: Tabloid
- Owner(s): News Group Newspapers (News International)
- Editor: Colin Myler
- Founded: 1 October 1843; 183 years ago
- Ceased publication: 10 July 2011; 15 years ago
- Political alignment: Conservative
- Headquarters: Wapping, London
- Circulation: 2,606,397 (April 2011)
- Sister newspapers: The Sun, The Times, The Sunday Times
- Website: newsoftheworld.co.uk (inactive, no longer updated)

The News of the World was a weekly national "red top" tabloid newspaper published every Sunday in the United Kingdom from 1843 to 2011. It was at one time the world's highest-selling English-language newspaper and at closure still had one of the highest English-language circulations. It was established as a broadsheet by John Browne Bell, who identified crime, sensation, and vice as the themes that would sell most copies. The Bells sold to Henry Lascelles Carr in 1891; in 1969, it was bought from the Carrs by Rupert Murdoch's media firm News Limited. In 1984, as News Limited reorganised into News International, a subsidiary of News Corporation, the newspaper transformed into a tabloid and became the Sunday sister paper of The Sun.

The News of the World concentrated in particular on celebrity scoops, gossip and populist news. Its somewhat prurient focus on sex scandals gained it the nickname Screws of the World. In its last decade it had a reputation for exposing celebrities' drug use, sexual peccadilloes, or criminal acts, by using insiders and journalists in disguise to provide video or photographic evidence, and covert phone hacking in ongoing police investigations. Sales averaged 2,812,005 copies per week in October 2010.

From 2006, allegations of phone hacking began to engulf the newspaper. These culminated in the revelation on 4 July 2011 that a private investigator hired by the newspaper had intercepted the voicemail of missing British teenager Milly Dowler, who was later found murdered.

Amid a public backlash and the withdrawal of advertising, News International announced the closure of the newspaper on 7 July 2011. The scandal deepened when the paper was alleged to have hacked into the phones of families of British service personnel killed in action. Senior figures on the newspaper have been held for questioning by police investigating the phone hacking and corruption allegations, alongside former Daily Mirror editor Piers Morgan. Arrested on 8 July 2011 were former editor Andy Coulson and former News of the World royal editor Clive Goodman, the latter jailed for phone hacking in 2007. The former executive editor Neil Wallis was arrested on 15 July 2011 and former editor Rebekah Brooks, the tenth person held in custody, on 17 July 2011.

During a visit to London on 17 February 2012, Murdoch announced he was soon to launch a Sunday edition of The Sun, which acted as a replacement to the News of the World. On 19 February 2012, it was announced that the first edition of The Sun on Sunday would be printed on 26 February 2012. It would employ some former News of the World journalists.

== History ==
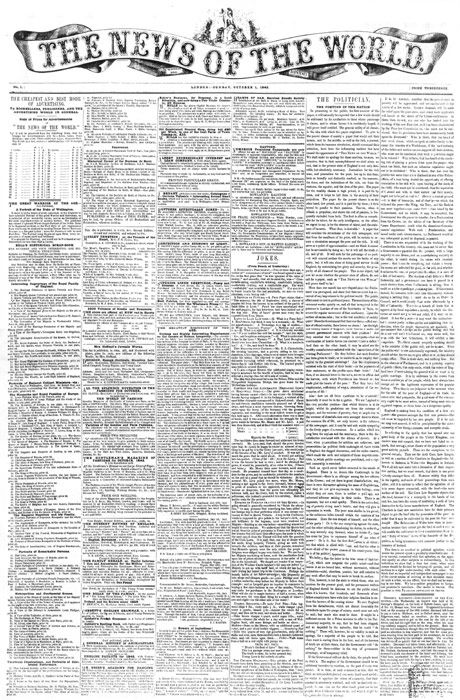
Front-page of the first issue

=== 1843 to 1968 ===
The newspaper was first published as The News of the World on 1 October 1843, by John Browne Bell in London. Priced at three pence (equal to £1.37 in 2025), even before the repeal of the Stamp act (1855) or paper duty (1861), it was the cheapest newspaper of its time and was aimed directly at the newly literate working classes. It quickly established itself as a purveyor of titillation, shock, and criminal news. Much of the source material came from coverage of vice prosecutions, including lurid transcripts of police descriptions of alleged brothels, streetwalkers, and "immoral" women. In 1924 the newspaper sponsored the 1924 Women's Olympiad held at Stamford Bridge in London.

Before long, the News of the World established itself as the most widely read Sunday paper, with initial sales of around 12,000 copies a week. Circulation had grown to 24,100 by 1845 and was 109,100 in 1854. Sales then suffered because the price was not cut following the abolition of newspaper taxes and the paper was soon no longer among the leading Sunday titles, selling around 30,000 by 1880, a greater number but a smaller proportion, as newspaper sales had grown hugely. The title was sold by the Bell family in 1891 to Henry Lascelles Carr who owned the Welsh Western Mail. As editor, he installed his nephew Emsley Carr, who held the post for 50 years. The real engine of the paper's now quick commercial success, however, was George Riddell, who reorganised its national distribution using local agents. Matthew Engel, in his book Tickle the Public: One Hundred Years of the Popular Press (Gollancz, 1996), says that the News of the World of the 1890s was "a very fine paper indeed". The paper was not without its detractors, though. As one writer later related:

Frederick Greenwood, editor of The Pall Mall Gazette, met in his club one day Lord Riddell, who died a few years ago, and in the course of conversation Riddell said to him, "You know, I own a paper."

"Oh, do you?" said Greenwood, "what is it?"

"It's called the News of the World—I'll send you a copy", replied Riddell, and in due course did so. Next time they met Riddell said, "Well Greenwood, what do you think of my paper?"

"I looked at it", replied Greenwood, "and then I put it in the waste-paper basket. And then I thought, 'If I leave it there the cook may read it'—so I burned it!"

By 1912, the circulation was two million and around three million by the early 1920s. Sales reached four million by 1939. This success encouraged other similar newspapers, of which The Sunday People, the Daily Mail, the Daily Express and the Daily Mirror are still being published.

In 1928, the paper began printing in Manchester on the presses of the News Chronicle in Derby Street, moving in 1960 into Thomson House, Withy Grove (formerly known as Kemsley House) when the News Chronicle closed. The move to Thomson House led to the immediate closure of the Empire News, a paper printed there and mainly circulating in the North of England and Wales with a circulation of about 2.5 million. Officially the Empire News and News of the World merged but Thomson House was already printing the Sunday Pictorial (to become the Sunday Mirror) and Sunday Times and did not have any further capacity with the News of the World arriving.

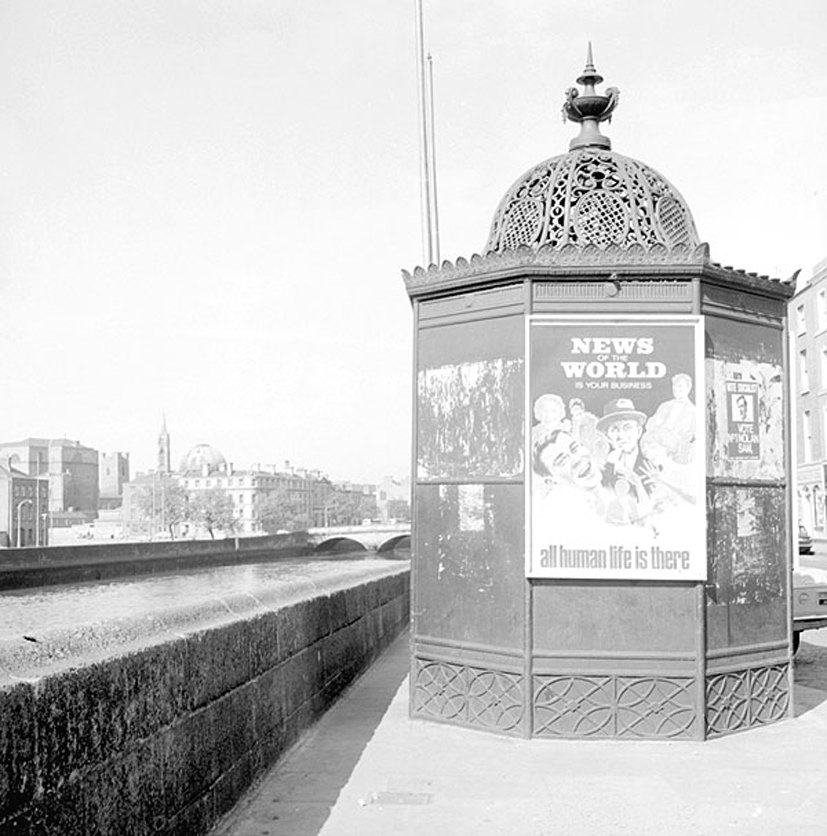
An advert for the News of the World in Dublin in 1969

The paper's motto was "All human life is there". The paper's name was linked with sports events as early as 1903 when the golfing tournament The News of the World Match Play Championship began (now under British PGA auspices). The News of the World Darts Championship existed from 1927 on a regional basis and became a national tournament from 1947 to 1990. There was also a News of the World Championship in snooker from 1950 to 1959 which eclipsed the official professionals' competition for a number of years. In athletics, the Emsley Carr Mile race was started in 1953 in memory of the former editor, and is still run annually. The paper's Football Annual was a long-standing publication (sponsoring it until 2008), and a Household Guide and Almanac was also published at one time.

By 1950, the News of the World had become the biggest-selling newspaper in the world with a weekly sale of 8,441,000 and individual editions sold over 9 million copies.

As with other Sunday newspapers, the News of the World was published on Saturday whenever Christmas Day fell on Sunday.

=== Murdoch ownership ===
The newspaper passed into the hands of Rupert Murdoch's News Ltd. in 1969, following a year-long struggle with Robert Maxwell's Pergamon Press. Maxwell's Czech origin, combined with his political opinions, provoked a hostile response to his bid from the Carrs and from the editor of the News of the World, Stafford Somerfield, who declared in an October 1968 front page leading article attacking Maxwell that the paper was "as British as roast beef and Yorkshire pudding".

News Ltd. arranged to swap shares in some of its minor ventures with the Carrs and by December it controlled 40% of the NOTW stock. Maxwell had been supported by the Jackson family (25% shareholders), but Murdoch had gained the support of the Carr family (30%) and then-chairman William Carr.

In January 1969, Maxwell's bid was rejected at a shareholders' meeting where half of those present were company staff, temporarily given voting shares. It was Murdoch's first Fleet Street acquisition. Maxwell accused Murdoch of employing "the laws of the jungle" to acquire the paper and said he had "made a fair and bona fide offer... which has been frustrated and defeated after three months of [cynical] manoeuvring." Murdoch denied this, arguing the shareholders of the News of the World Group had "judged [his] record in Australia." Illness removed Sir William Carr from the chairmanship in June 1969, and Murdoch succeeded him.

Murdoch came under severe criticism in a television interview with David Frost after the newspaper published extracts, in late summer 1969, from the memoirs of Christine Keeler. Keeler had been a central figure in the Profumo scandal which had emerged to public scrutiny in 1963. Murdoch regretted agreeing to the interview with Frost. In February 1970, Stafford Somerfield was dismissed as editor after coming into conflict with Murdoch, whose takeover he had opposed.

During the four decades of Murdoch's ownership, the newspaper had to frequently defend itself against libel charges as well as complaints to the Press Council (later the Press Complaints Commission) on accusations of certain news-gathering techniques, such as entrapment, and contentious campaigns. Some of the better-known of these were the "Bob and Sue" case with reporter Neville Thurlbeck, and various cases involving journalist Mazher Mahmood.

The newspaper, which had generally supported the Conservative Party throughout its history (endorsing Edward Heath in the 1970 and both 1974 elections), maintained its political posture during the early years of the Murdoch era, whereas its weekday sister The Sun did not have a definitive allegiance, (supporting Harold Wilson's Labour Party in 1970, Heath in February 1974 and Jeremy Thorpe's Liberal Party in October 1974) until the late 1970s when it became a strong supporter of the Conservative Party. Both newspapers later endorsed Tony Blair's New Labour during the late 1990s and early 2000s before switching back to the Conservatives during David Cameron's leadership.

Starting in 1981, a magazine supplement (Sunday) was included with the paper and, in 1984, the newspaper changed from broadsheet to tabloid format. The paper was printed in Hertfordshire, Liverpool, Dinnington near Sheffield, Portsmouth, Glasgow and Dublin, with a separate edition produced in Belfast. It was also printed at a number of sites abroad including Madrid, Brussels, Cyprus and Orlando in Florida, US.

In 1985, the News of the World moved out of Thomson House when the building was bought by the tycoon Robert Maxwell (and renamed Maxwell House) and, after a short spell on the Daily Express presses in Great Ancoats Street, moved to a new plant at Knowsley on Merseyside.

In 2011 the then editor, Colin Myler, described it as "the greatest newspaper in the world" as it had won four awards at the British Press Awards. The award for News Reporter of the Year, went to Mazher Mahmood, the "fake sheikh" who hides his identity, for his exposé of corruption in the cricketing world. The paper also won top show-business reporter and magazine of the year.

=== End of publication ===
It was announced on 7 July 2011 that, after 168 years in print, the newspaper would print its final edition on 10 July 2011 following revelations of the ongoing phone hacking scandal, with the loss of 200 jobs. The paper announced that all profits from the final edition – 74 pence out of the £1 cover price – would go to "good causes", and advertising space would be given to charities; the remaining 26 pence for each copy went to retailers selling the paper and to wholesalers. Shutting the newspaper cost News Group Newspapers around £240m.

The government of the United Kingdom said it had no role in the decision. James Murdoch claimed that the company was fully co-operating with ongoing police investigations.

The edition of 10 July 2011 of the News of the World carried its final headline, "Thank You & Goodbye", superimposed on top of a collage of past front pages. The back cover featured a quote from George Orwell's Nineteen Eighty-Four that mentions the paper, and a recent quote from a NotW reader. The final edition also included a 48-page pullout documenting the history of the paper. On 9 July 2011, after production of the final edition wrapped, editor Colin Myler led the staff out of the building, where he held a press conference thanking the staff and its readers, concluding, "In the best tradition, we are going to the pub." The paper's final, and unattributed, editorial, stated that "Phones were hacked, and for that this newspaper is truly sorry... there is no justification for this appalling wrongdoing." The final edition sold 3.8 million copies, about a million more than usual.

News International launched a Sunday edition of The Sun to replace the News of the World on 26 February 2012 following speculation. The domain names sunonsunday.co.uk, thesunonsunday.co.uk and thesunonsunday.com were registered on 5 July 2011 by News International Newspapers Limited.

== Editors ==
- 1843: John Browne Bell
- 1855: John William Bell
- 1877: Walter John Bell and Adolphus William Bell
- 1891: Emsley Carr
- 1941: David Percy Davies
- 1946: Robert Skelton
- 1947: Arthur Waters
- 1953: Reg Cudlipp
- 1960: Stafford Somerfield
- 1970: Cyril Lear
- 1974: Peter Stephens
- 1975: Bernard Shrimsley
- 1980: Kenneth Donlan
- 1981: Barry Askew
- 1981: Derek Jameson
- 1984: Nicholas Lloyd
- 1985: David Montgomery
- 1987: Wendy Henry
- 1988: Patsy Chapman
- 1993: Stuart Higgins
- 1994: Piers Morgan
- 1995: Phil Hall
- 2000: Rebekah Wade
- 2003: Andy Coulson
- 2007: Colin Myler

== Notable contributors ==
- Bob Bird – final Scottish News of the World editor
- Victoria Newton – final deputy editor
- Neville Thurlbeck – mainly responsible for the Beckham/Loos story
- Dan Wootton – showbusiness
- Bertie Ahern – former Irish taoiseach
- Philip Wrack – deputy editor 1970–1989, later ombudsman
- Unity Tanzier Hall – the agony aunt
- Stuart Kuttner – assistant editor from 1980, managing editor 1987–2009

== Controversies ==
=== Imprisonment of Mick Jagger and Keith Richards (1967) ===
In early 1967, the newspaper ran a three-part feature entitled "Pop Stars and Drugs: Facts That Will Shock You". The series described alleged LSD parties hosted by the Moody Blues and attended by top stars including the Who's Pete Townshend and Cream's Ginger Baker, and alleged admissions of drug use by leading pop musicians. The first article targeted Donovan (who was raided and charged soon after); the second installment (published on 5 February) targeted the Rolling Stones. A reporter who contributed to the story spent an evening at the exclusive London club Blaise's, where a member of the Rolling Stones allegedly took several Benzedrine tablets, displayed a piece of hashish and invited his companions back to his flat for a "smoke". The article claimed that the member was singer Mick Jagger, although the reporter had in fact been eavesdropping on guitarist Brian Jones.

On 10 May 1967, Jagger, Keith Richards, and their friend art dealer Robert Fraser were arrested at Richards' Redlands estate in West Wittering and charged with possession of cannabis and amphetamines, while bandmate Jones' London house was also raided by police and he was arrested and charged with cannabis possession along with his friend Stanislas "Stash" Klossowski, son of French artist Balthus. Jagger and Richards were tried at the end of June. On 29 June, Jagger was sentenced to three months' imprisonment for possession of four amphetamine tablets; Richards was found guilty of allowing cannabis to be smoked on his property and sentenced to one year in prison. Both Jagger and Richards were imprisoned at that point, but were released on bail the next day pending appeal.

The News of the World was rapidly identified by the hippy counterculture as the prime culprit for the imprisonments, which were seen as an attempt by the establishment to send a collective message to a hedonistic young generation. International Times and activist and musician Mick Farren organised protests outside the Fleet Street offices of the newspaper. Protesters informed the paper's staff that their objective was "freeing the fucking Stones and closing down the fucking News of the World". Farren later credited his colleague Sue Miles with identifying the paper as a target for protest because, as she put it, "they were the bastards who started this" (with their feature on drugs in music). Farren reported that a second night of protests was broken up by officers from City of London Police, who beat him up and made a number of arrests.

Criticism of the sentences also came from the News of the World's future sister publication The Times, which ran an editorial entitled "Who breaks a butterfly on a wheel?" in which conservative editor William Rees-Mogg surprised his readers by his unusually critical discourse on the sentencing, pointing out that Jagger had been treated far more harshly for a minor first offence than "any purely anonymous young man". On 31 July, the appeals court overturned Richards' conviction, and Jagger's sentence was reduced to a conditional discharge. Brian Jones' trial took place in November 1967; in December, after appealing the original prison sentence, Jones was fined £1,000, put on three years' probation and ordered to seek professional help.

Commenting on the closure in 2011 of the newspaper against which he had led protests 44 years earlier, Farren was in triumphant mood:

The British counterculture and The News Of The World have had an adversarial relationship that goes back for almost half a century. I recall, way back in 1967, being beaten bloody by police outside the NOTW offices in London's Fleet Street while protesting the newspaper's part in the jailing of Keith Richards and Mick Jagger after the Redlands drug bust. And then there were the regular stamp-out-these-hippie-dope-fiends "exposés" that fueled the dangerous red-faced ire of all the saloon bar tweed blowhards who "only read the paper for the sports" and not the weekly catalogue of rape cases. And then, of course, the whole game was played all over again against John Rotten and his ilk in the punk era. Rupert Murdoch has closed down his disgusting organ and I hope its memory will yellow and decay. Unfortunately, I suspect the NOTW will soon be replaced by something equally loathsome like The Sunday Sun.

=== "Chequebook" journalism ===
The paper became notorious for chequebook journalism, as it was often discovered attempting to buy stories, typically concerning private affairs and relationships, of people closely involved with figures of public interest such as politicians, celebrities and high-profile criminals. With this intention, the paper on occasion paid key witnesses in criminal trials such as the 1966 Moors murders case, and the 1999 trial of Gary Glitter on charges of assaulting an underage teenage fan.

=== Anti-paedophile campaign (2000) ===
The paper began a controversial campaign to name and shame alleged paedophiles in July 2000, following the abduction and murder of Sarah Payne in West Sussex. During the trial of her killer Roy Whiting, it emerged that he had a previous conviction for abduction and sexual assault against a child. The paper's decision led to some instances of action being taken against those suspected of being child sex offenders, which included several cases of mistaken identity, including one instance where a paediatrician had her house vandalised, and another where a man was confronted because he had a neck brace similar to one a paedophile was wearing when pictured. The campaign was labelled "grossly irresponsible" journalism by the then-chief constable of Gloucestershire, Tony Butler.

=== Phone hacking scandal ===
From the nineties until the newspaper's demise in 2011, reporters at the paper used private investigators to illegally gain access to hundreds of mobile phone voicemail accounts held by a variety of people of interest to the newspaper. In 2007 the paper's royal correspondent, Clive Goodman, pleaded guilty to illegal interception of personal communication and was jailed for four months; the paper's editor, Andy Coulson, had resigned two weeks earlier. In 2009/2010, further revelations emerged on the extent of the phone hacking, and how it was common knowledge within the News of the World and its News International parent. According to a former reporter at the paper, "Everyone knew. The office cat knew", about the illegal activities used to scoop stories.

On 17 January 2011, The Guardian reported that Glenn Mulcaire, a private investigator paid by the paper, testified that he had been asked by the newspaper's leadership to hack voicemail accounts on its behalf. In April 2011, attorneys for the victims alleged that as many as 7,000 people had their phones hacked by the News of the World; it was further revealed that the paper's owner, Rupert Murdoch, had attempted to pressure Prime Minister Gordon Brown and Labour Party MPs to "back away" from investigating the scandal. Three journalists on the newspaper were initially arrested: Ian Edmondson and Neville Thurlbeck on 5 April and James Weatherup on 14 April. The newspaper "unreservedly" apologised for its phone hacking activities during April 2011. On 4 July 2011, it was disclosed that potential evidence had been deleted in spring 2002 from the hacked voicemail account of Milly Dowler, then missing, but later found to have been murdered.

=== 2006 reward for information on murders ===
On 13 December 2006, the newspaper announced that it was offering a record-breaking reward of £250,000 for information leading to the arrest and conviction of the person or persons responsible for the murders of five prostitutes around Ipswich, Suffolk. The reward went unclaimed; Steve Wright was arrested on suspicion of murder six days later following the use of unrelated information to link him to the murders. He was found guilty of all five murders at his trial 14 months later and sentenced to life imprisonment.

=== The Victoria Beckham 'kidnap plot' ===
In 2002, Mazher Mahmood, an undercover reporter working for the News of the World, also known as the Fake Sheikh, allegedly exposed a plot to kidnap Victoria Beckham. Five men were arrested but the trial later collapsed when it emerged the News of the World had paid its main witness Florim Gashi £10,000 to work with Mazher Mahmood. Florim Gashi later admitted working with Mahmood to set up the kidnap plot. This led to an investigation by Scotland Yard on the News of the World called Operation Canopus.

=== "Fake sheikh" cricket scandal ===
In August 2010, Mahmood posed as the "Fake Sheikh" to expose a cricket bookie named Mazhar Majeed who claimed Pakistani cricketers had committed spot-fixing during Pakistan's 2010 tour of England. In November 2011, Salman Butt and Mohammad Asif were found guilty by a London court on criminal charges relating to spot-fixing. Mohammad Amir and Majeed had entered guilty pleas on the same charges.

=== Links to police corruption ===
In a September 2010 interview broadcast on 7 July 2011 on the BBC Radio 4 news programme The World at One, former News of the World features editor Paul McMullan made an admission relating to police corruption. He told of having used material obtained by a colleague's bribery of a police officer as the basis of a series of articles published over several years on Jennifer Elliott, the daughter of the actor Denholm Elliott. The articles described Jennifer Elliott's destitute situation and stated that she had worked as a prostitute. She took her own life in 2003. In 2011, the paper knowingly used private investigators to gain stories from corrupt police officers.

=== Libel actions ===
Max Mosley won damages for the newspaper's invasion of privacy and incorrect assertion about the Nazi theme in Mosley v News Group Newspapers Limited.

- In 1988, the parents of actor David Scarboro, who played Mark Fowler on the BBC soap opera EastEnders, commenced libel proceedings with solicitor Michael Shelton due to the alleged hounding of Scarboro whilst he suffered from mental illness. During this time the News of the World and its sister paper The Sun published negative stories about Scarboro and suggested that he took cocaine. According to the parents of David Scarboro this escalated Scarboro's depression resulting in his suicide on 27 April 1988. Due to the suicide the libel action was forced to cease.
- In 2005, British television personality Ahmed Aghil won an apology from the News of the World in a libel case.
- In 2005, England footballer David Beckham and his wife Victoria brought a legal action against the paper seeking libel damages over an article that carried the headline "Posh and Becks on the Rocks"; suggesting that their marriage was under pressure. The legal action was withdrawn in 2006 and "resolved on a confidential basis", according to the couple's spokeswoman Jo Milloy.
- In April 2006, England footballer Wayne Rooney received £100,000 in damages from the publishers of the News of the World and its sister paper The Sun over articles falsely reporting he had slapped his fiancée Coleen McLoughlin.
- In June 2006, England footballer Ashley Cole received an estimated minimum £100,000 in damages from the publishers of the News of the World and its sister paper The Sun. The News of the World had published a false story about two footballers having a gay orgy with a DJ; while not naming any of them, it used a pixelated photograph of Cole to illustrate the story.
- In July 2006, Scottish politician Tommy Sheridan initiated a libel case against the News of the World in Edinburgh. Sheridan denied allegations, made by the newspaper in November 2004 and January 2005, that he had an affair, engaged in group sex and attended a swinger's club in Manchester. Sheridan won the case and was awarded £200,000 in damages. The newspaper appealed against the jury's decision, and refused to pay out the money; Sheridan and his wife Gail were charged with perjury; the court case commenced on 4 October 2010. Charges against Gail Sheridan were dropped and she was acquitted on 17 December 2010. Sheridan was subsequently convicted on 23 December 2010. The case was the longest perjury trial in Scottish history.
- In 2008 in the invasion of privacy case Mosley v News Group Newspapers Limited the President of the FIA Max Mosley challenged the News of the World which had alleged on 30 March 2008 that he had been involved in a sadomasochistic sex act involving several female prostitutes, when they published a video of the incident recorded by one of the women, and published details of the incident. The case resulted in Mosley being awarded £60,000 in damages.
- In 2009 Barry George, a man who had been falsely convicted of murdering television presenter Jill Dando, won a libel claim filed against the publisher of the News of the World after the paper fabricated quotes to suggest he had stalked other women.
- In January 2010, Norwich City Football Club started legal proceedings against the News of the World after they published an article, "Canaries on Brink" on 24 January 2010 claiming that the club had begun the processes of going into administration.
- In February 2010, actor Brad Pitt and his partner, actress Angelina Jolie made plans to sue the News of the World after it published allegations about their relationship.
- In June 2011, the UK Press Complaint Commission (PCC) gave Yasir Hameed, a Pakistani cricketer, a victory by ordering the News of the World to remove a video and story about him from its website.
- Also in 2011, Polish footballer Artur Boruc won an out-of-court settlement against the News of the World after the newspaper made false allegations that he was unfaithful to his girlfriend. Boruc was paid £70,000 and a full apology was issued.

== Awards ==
The British Press Awards:

- "Newspaper of the Year" (2005)
- "Scoop of the Year" (2000, 'Archer quits'; 2005, 'Beckham's secret affair'; 2011, 'Cricket corruption')
- "Front Page of the Year" (2004, 'Huntley in his cell')
- "Reporter of the Year" (Gary Jones, 1995, Mazher Mahmood, 1999, 2011)

== See also ==
- Sun On Sunday
- News media phone hacking scandal reference lists
- Metropolitan police role in phone hacking scandal
- Rebekah Brooks (Current CEO of News UK)
- Operation Weeting
- Junk food news
