= Murder of Muriel McKay =

British murder and kidnapping in 1969

Muriel McKay
- Born: 4 February 1914; Adelaide, South Australia, Australia
- Died: c. 31 December 1969 (aged 55); Rooks Farm, Stocking Pelham, Hertfordshire, England
- Spouse: Alick McKay
- Children: 3

On 29 December 1969, Muriel Freda McKay, a 55‑year‑old Australian woman, was kidnapped in London in a case that became one of the United Kingdom's earliest murder convictions without a body. She was abducted after being mistaken for Anna Murdoch, the then‑wife of media proprietor Rupert Murdoch. McKay was married to Alick McKay (sometimes referred to as Alex), an executive at News Limited and Murdoch's deputy. Two Indo‑Trinidadian brothers, Arthur and Nizamodeen Hosein, were convicted of her kidnapping and murder in September 1970.

== Disappearance ==
Muriel McKay and her husband, Alick, were born and raised in Adelaide, South Australia. They moved to London in 1958 for Alick's job as a newspaper executive with Rupert Murdoch's News Limited and lived in St Mary's House on Arthur Road, Wimbledon. Their three adult children, Jennifer, Dianne and Ian, also lived in the United Kingdom.

On 29 December 1969, intruders entered the McKay home and abducted her while her husband was at work. When Alick returned at 7:45 pm, he found the front door unlocked, the telephone torn from the wall, the contents of McKay's handbag scattered on the stairs, and the house empty. He reported her missing at 8 pm. The incident was troubling given that jewellery had been stolen in a burglary three months earlier, after which McKay had become increasingly cautious about her personal safety.

== Investigation ==
When police arrived, the burglary case was quickly upgraded to a kidnapping after investigators found several items that were foreign to the house: Elastoplast, twine, a newspaper, and a billhook. After the telephone was repaired at 1 am, a caller identifying himself as "M3" (said to stand for Mafia 3) contacted the house and demanded a £1 million ransom. Over the next 40 days, M3 made 18 further calls, asked to speak to either Alick or their children, and sent three letters (postmarked in Tottenham or Wood Green) demanding the money while repeatedly threatening to kill McKay. Five letters written by McKay and pleading for compliance were enclosed as "proof" that she was alive, as were three pieces cut from her clothing.

Two attempts to deliver half of the ransom money were unsuccessful. The first, on the A10 road on 1 February 1970, was abandoned due to a large police presence in the area.

For the second attempt on 6 February, the kidnappers asked for Dianne to make the drop-off, as she had been at the forefront of communication with the McKay family. Following M3's detailed instructions, two disguised police officers (instead of Dianne) placed the ransom, consisting of two lots of £500,000 (primarily composed of fake banknotes), in two suitcases and left them at a telephone box in Church Street in Tottenham, where they were to await further instructions. At 4 pm, M3 rang and instructed them to take the money to a second phone box in Bethnal Green. There, M3 rang again and directed the officers to take the London Underground to Epping, where they were to proceed to another phone box. Upon their arrival in Epping, M3 rang and instructed them to take a taxi to a used car yard with a garage in Bishop's Stortford, where they were told to leave the cases next to a minivan that would be parked on the forecourt.

Police surveillance in the area noted that a blue Volvo with a broken tail-light, bearing registration XGO 994G and carrying a single occupant, passed the garage slowly four times between 8 pm and 10.30 pm. At 10.47 pm it passed again, this time carrying two men. However, a local couple noticed the suitcases and became concerned. The woman kept watch while her husband reported the cases to the local police, who were unaware of the drop-off and took them to Epping police station.

The investigation soon shifted to the Volvo, which was registered to a man at Rooks Farm near Stocking Pelham, Hertfordshire. Reviewing earlier reports, police noted that witnesses had described seeing a dark-coloured Volvo saloon driving near Arthur Road in the hours before McKay's disappearance, and another had reported it parked in the McKay driveway at around 6 pm. Police had also observed the Volvo acting suspiciously during the first drop-off attempt but had assumed it belonged to undercover officers or a local resident.

Rooks Farm, which covered eleven acres (4.5 ha) and was considerably run down, was raided by police at 8 am on 7 February. The owners were Trinidad-born Arthur Hosein and his German-born wife, Elsa. Their two children and Arthur's youngest sibling, Nizamodeen, who had worked as a labourer on the farm since August, also lived there. A notebook was found with torn pages that matched the tear patterns in McKay's letters. Twine and a matching roll of tape were recovered, and the billhook was identified as belonging to a neighbour. The brothers' physical descriptions matched those of the men seen in the Volvo, and Arthur's fingerprints matched those found on the ransom letters and on a newspaper recovered from the McKay house. Similarly, Nizamodeen's voice matched recordings of M3 when tested on a telephone. No trace of McKay was found at the farm, even after several weeks of searching.

== Trial ==
Based on the evidence, the Hosein brothers were arrested and sent to trial on 14 September 1970, with the prosecution led by Peter Rawlinson. At trial it emerged that Arthur, a tailor in Hackney, had been experiencing financial difficulty after buying Rooks Farm in May 1968. The Hoseins decided to kidnap Anna Murdoch after watching her husband being interviewed on television about his recent purchase of the News of the World and The Sun newspapers on 3 October 1969. Confusion arose when the brothers followed Murdoch's chauffeured Rolls-Royce to the house in Arthur Road, which they assumed to be the Murdoch family residence, but which was in fact the home of the McKays. Murdoch had lent the car to Alick for a few weeks while he and his wife were in Australia.

Throughout the case, each brother attempted to place responsibility on the other, although it was soon established that Arthur was the dominant sibling. The Hoseins were charged with murder, kidnap, and blackmail, and were convicted at the Old Bailey on 6 October 1970. When imposing life sentences on both men, plus 25 years in Arthur's case and 15 in Nizamodeen's, the trial judge, Mr Justice Shaw, said their "conduct was cold-blooded and abominable". Despite extensive investigation, it was never established what happened to McKay's remains, although there was speculation that the brothers had disposed of them by feeding them to their guard dogs or pigs.

== Aftermath ==
The Hosein brothers were sent to prison, where they attempted to appeal their sentences in March 1971. In November 1987 and September 1994, Arthur unsuccessfully applied for parole. He died at Ashworth Secure Hospital in 2009, whereas Nizamodeen served 20 years and was deported to Trinidad following his release.

The nature of the case led to widespread media coverage, along with numerous hoaxes, prank letters, and phone calls to the McKay home. The Dutch psychic Gerard Croiset, who had participated in several high‑profile missing person investigations, also became involved, although the accuracy of his information has been widely overstated. Because of the notoriety of the case, likenesses of the Hosein brothers were displayed in the Chamber of Horrors at Madame Tussauds, alongside those of murderers Donald Neilson and Graham Young.

In 2017, Kelvin MacKenzie's review of Ink, a play about the history of The Sun, described the section concerning McKay's kidnapping as its "most dramatic moment". Jane Martinson, in her review for The Guardian, described the same portion as the play's "most uncomfortable moment".

The incident left Anna Murdoch, the kidnappers' originally intended target, feeling isolated and unsettled, eventually prompting the Murdoch family to return to Australia. Anna, who later served on the board of News Corporation, died on 17 February 2026, aged 81.

In 2026, McKay's kidnapping was referenced in Dynasty: The Murdochs, a four‑part documentary series about the Murdoch family's media empire and internal dynamics, which premiered on Netflix on 13 March 2026. The series explored aspects of the family's history, including the impact of the McKay case on Anna Murdoch and the broader Murdoch narrative. Additionally, the Channel 5 true‑crime documentary series A Killer Makes a Call featured an episode on McKay's kidnapping from her Wimbledon home, detailing the telephone calls made by Arthur and Nizamodeen as part of the ransom demands and police investigation. This episode was released on 10 March 2026.

=== Searches for McKay's body ===
An initial search for McKay was carried out at Rooks Farm following the arrest of the Hosein brothers in February 1970, but progress was hampered by hardened ground caused by cold weather, and no trace of her was found.

In 2021, it was reported that Nizamodeen had told a QC that McKay died of a heart attack shortly after the kidnapping and had provided details of the location of her body at Rooks Farm, which in the intervening years had been renamed Stocking Farm. Although he denied any knowledge of the kidnapping in the Sky News documentary The Wimbledon Kidnapping, his account prompted a second search in 2022. When that search proved unsuccessful, he alleged that police had excavated the wrong area, a view later shared by McKay's family. In November 2023, he asked to be allowed to return to the United Kingdom to show where he had buried McKay. He signed a £40,000 settlement with the McKay family to reveal the burial site but later declined the money and freely described how and where Muriel had died. In December 2023, McKay's daughter Dianne urged the Metropolitan Police to cooperate with Nizamodeen to ensure the recovery of her mother's body.

In January 2024, the Home Office refused to allow Nizamodeen to return to Britain to identify the burial site. Dianne and her son, Mark, subsequently travelled to Trinidad on 27 January with The Times and Sky News to interview him over two days. They stated that he had disclosed the exact location of the burial and had asked to return to Britain to point it out. On 29 January, Detective Superintendent Katherine Goodwin of Scotland Yard contacted Dianne by telephone and agreed that she could provide recordings of the meeting. In March 2024, Goodwin told the family that investigators were due to interview him in Trinidad, with the intention of using the interview to support a renewed Home Office request for his temporary return to Britain. The interview lasted three days. Afterwards, Goodwin texted the family to say that Nizamodeen had been "unable to provide a location with any consistency". Dianne said that the family felt "completely let down by the police" and had warned that a formal, police‑station interview with a male officer would go badly. The family had also asked that the senior investigating officer not be sent to Trinidad, following a failed videolink interview during the 2022 search in which Nizamodeen became unresponsive and required hospital treatment. The same officer had previously been the subject of a complaint by the family after an incident during the 2022 search in which he was alleged to have shouted at Dianne.

In May 2024, Scotland Yard contacted the family to confirm that Stocking Farm would be searched within six weeks. In June 2024, he met Detective Superintendent Goodwin at the farm to agree the search area. The search began on 15 July 2024, with police allowing between seven and ten days to complete it. The area to be examined was three times the size of the original search zone. On 22 July, police announced that the search had been unsuccessful and no remains had been recovered. McKay's family expressed dissatisfaction with the conduct of the search and insisted that Nizamodeen should have been brought to the farm to pinpoint the location. Police stated that he had been inconsistent in his accounts and had incorrectly recalled certain events.

In October 2024, the family said they were willing to buy Stocking Farm for more than £1,000,000 in order to carry out their own search of the land. Nizamodeen's lawyer said that he remained willing to assist with any future searches. In November 2024, Ian flew to Trinidad to speak with Nizamodeen after he specifically requested a meeting; he again indicated where he believed McKay was buried. Around this time, Ian also alleged that areas of Stocking Farm had not been searched by police despite earlier assurances that they would be.

In June 2025, the McKay family publicly offered the original £1 million ransom as a final effort to recover McKay's remains, stating that the sum would be awarded to any member of the public who provided credible evidence leading directly to their recovery. The family emphasised that the reward would not be paid if any illegal activity was involved in obtaining or supplying the information. Three new leads emerged as a result. One came from the children of a man who alleged to have previously employed Arthur at his tailor's shop in Bethnal Green. According to the siblings, their father had disclosed information to them and had given permission for it to be shared after his death. They provided details to the family, some of which had not previously been made public, including a description of a grey Hillman car consistent with one allegedly mentioned by McKay in a phone call, and an account of a strong odour noticed beneath the shop's staircase for a brief period. The siblings suggested that her remains may have been moved from Stocking Farm to Bethnal Green. The McKay family attempted to contact the current leaseholders and freeholder of the property, who declined access.

On 10 November 2025, Chief Master Schuman formally declared McKay dead at the High Court in London, 56 years after her abduction. Until this declaration, the family had been advised that they had no legal standing to pursue a civil case for access to the property. The declaration confirmed her official presumed time and date of death as 11:59 pm on 31 December 1969. Limited letters of administration were also granted, allowing the family to proceed with legal action against the leaseholders of the Bethnal Green property. The family subsequently applied for an injunction against the leaseholders, with the matter heard by Mr Justice Richard Smith on 24 November 2025 at the High Court in London. He handed down his judgment the following day, denying the injunction and suggesting that the family had deployed unlawful tactics of deception and harassment in their attempts to "bully" their way into the property. The family stated that they had done nothing wrong and said that their behaviour had been "exaggerated", despite the judge's findings.

In December 2025, the McKay family renewed their public criticism of the Metropolitan Police, accusing the force of obstructing and frustrating efforts to establish the location of McKay's remains. Her son, Ian, alleged that police had blocked the pursuit of leads with alleged historical connections to the kidnappers, particularly the Bethnal Green lead. The family said that the police response had closed off viable lines of enquiry and prolonged their decades‑long search for answers. Police stated that they had assessed the lead and did not believe it met the evidential threshold for further investigation, and that the family's proposed methods were improper, as noted by the judge. In March 2026, a search was carried out at the Bethnal Green property in East London. Initially, a ground-penetrating radar scan was conducted, identifying anomalies within the garden, leading to a subsequent dig. During the dig, a nine‑inch bone fragment was uncovered approximately one metre below ground, raising hopes of a breakthrough. Subsequent forensic examination by the Metropolitan Police determined that the bone was not human, although no further details were provided regarding its origin. Muriel's grandson, Mark, said he believed her remains may have been deliberately concealed or mixed with animal remains to hinder future investigation, suggesting that this could explain the discovery. He stated the family's intention to continue investigating the site as part of their ongoing efforts to find answers and achieve closure.

The kidnapping of McKay is depicted in Ink (2026), directed by Danny Boyle and adapted by James Graham from his stage play of the same name. The film, which focuses on Rupert Murdoch and editor Larry Lamb during the early years of The Sun, incorporates McKay's 1969 kidnapping as a significant part of its narrative. She is portrayed by actress Lucy Russell. The film premiered at the 83rd Venice International Film Festival in September 2026 and is due for release in the US from 11 December 2026, and in UK theatres from 8 January 2027.

In November 2026, the family of Muriel McKay initiated judicial review proceedings against the Metropolitan Police, seeking to reopen the investigation and conduct further excavations at a property on Bethnal Green Road.

The legal challenge also seeks clarification regarding two sets of bones discovered earlier in 2026. There are concerns about the police's reported reliance on Microsoft Copilot AI to analyse the bones. Police subsequently confirmed that one of the larger bones belonged to a cow, potentially supporting suggestions made during the original 1970 proceedings that Muriel's remains may have been concealed alongside those of a cow.

The Metropolitan Police have until 1 December 2026 to acknowledge the proceedings and submit grounds of opposition if they intend to contest the claim. The family continue to seek answers and the recovery of Muriel McKay's remains.

== See also ==
- List of kidnappings (1960–1969)
- List of solved missing person cases (1950–1969)
