= Abortive Honours of Britain and Ireland =

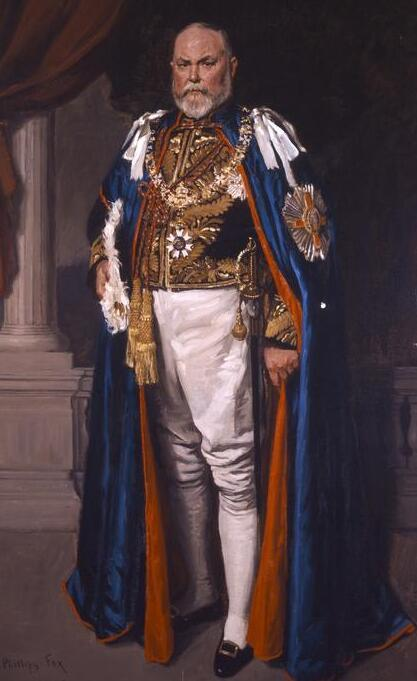
"Lord Forrest". One of the most famous examples of a Ghost Honour.

In the British honours system an Abortive or Ghost Honour is an informal term referring to when an individual is nominated for a peerage, title, or award, but either dies or withdraws their acceptance prior to its formal conferral (either by letters patent for peerages and baronetcies, or investiture for knighthoods, damehoods, and other decorations). Most cases of abortive honours have resulted from the death of the nominee before the honour legally came into existence, something which is distinct from instances of abeyance, forfeiture, or voluntary renunciation.

Many of these intended honours are recorded in archived Cabinet Office papers, royal correspondence, and ministerial documents, and the Crown Office in Chancery maintains records of draft patents, warrants, and related paperwork for all proposed, approved, and fully drafted honours. Some of the most recent cases have also featured in national newspapers, such as Sir David English.

Instances have occurred where honours have been formally announced, even gazetted, but due to the sudden death of the nominee before the formal creation process, the honour was never officially bestowed. One of the most famous examples is that of Sir John Forrest, an Australian explorer and politician, who acted as the first Premier of Western Australia. He was nominated to be raised the Peerage of the United Kingdom as Baron Forrest of Bunbury by the Australian Prime Minister William Morris Hughes, and the honour was publicly announced in the national newspapers, such as The Sydney Mail. He would have been the very first Australian peer, but no letters patent were issued before his death at sea off the coast of Sierra Leone while on route to England, meaning that the peerage was never officially created. All references to him as "Lord Forrest" are therefore erroneous (see Australian Peers and Baronets).

== Abortive Honours of Britain and Ireland ==
Key
(H)	Hereditary honour, e.g. hereditary barony
(L)	Life honour, e.g. life peer

Name	Year	Honour	Title (if relevant)	Notes
Sir William Wiseman	1672	Unknown	Unknown	A royalist baronet nominated by King Charles II for a peerage. A royal warrant was signed but the patent was never sealed before his death.
Alexander Abercromby	1791	Unknown	Unknown	An advocate and judge, Lord Abercromby was notified of a peerage nomination, but died suddenly of pulmonary disease before the process was completed.
Alan Gardner, 1st Baron Gardner of Uttoxeter	1809	Viscountcy	Viscount Gardner, of Uttoxeter	An admiral and politician who was to be elevated from Baron to Viscount, but died before it could be formally bestowed, even though patents had already been drafted.
Sir William Campbell	1834	Knighthood	n/a	The Chief Justice of Upper Canada was nominated for a knighthood of the Royal Guelphic Order, but died before the formal investiture.
Sir James Campbell	1866	Baronetcy	Unknown	A businessman and politician who was informed he was to receive a baronetcy from the government of Lord Derby, but letters patent were never issued before Lord Derby left office, and Campbell died having never formally received the honour.
Sir William Henry Gregory	1892	Unknown	Unknown	A Governor of British Ceylon and trustee of the National Gallery who was offered a peerage by Prime Minister Lord Salisbury, but died in 1892 before it was officially conferred.
Sir John Forrest	1918	Barony (H)	Baron Forrest, of Bunbury	The first Premier of Western Australia was nominated by Prime Minister Billy Hughes for a hereditary peerage, but died aboard a troopship before the letters patent could be issued.
Andrew Bonar Law	1923	Viscountcy	Unknown	A Prime Minister of the United Kingdom for whom a Viscountcy was intended according to ministerial correspondence, but died so abruptly due to terminal throat cancer, that the title was never actualised.
Sir Ian MacDonald Horobin	1962	Barony (L)	Unknown	A soldier, poet, and politician who was nominated for a life peerage, which was announced on 29 March 1962, but who withdrew his acceptance voluntarily before letters patent were issued, citing that the role would demand too much.
Alfred Robert Grindlay	1965	Barontecy	Grindlay Baronetcy, of Allesley	An industrialist and Mayor of Coventry during the Blitz who was nominated for a baronetcy by Coventry City Council, but died in 1965 before the honour was formally conferred.
Daniel Patrick O'Connell	1979	Barony (L)	Unknown	A barrister and academic who was nominated for a life peerage in the 1979, but died before the honour could be granted.
John Emerson Harding Harding-Davies	1979	Barony (L)	Baron Harding-Davies, of St. Mellons	A businessman and politician whose peerage was announced in the Queen's Birthday Honours list on 26th June 1979, but who died only 8 days later, before the patent of creation passed the Great Seal.
Dame Shelagh Marjorie Roberts	1991	Barony (L)	Unknown	The politician and Chairman of the London Tourist Board was included in the Queen's New Year's Honours list on 30th December 1991, but died before the process could be completed.
Sir David English	1998	Barony (L)	Unknown	A journalist and newspaper editor who was approved for a life peerage in the 1998 Queen's Birthday Honours list, but died on 10 June 1998, the day the intended honour was publicly announced. The peerage was never created.

== See also ==
- British nobility
- Peerage of the United Kingdom
- Peerages in the United Kingdom
- Lists of baronetcies - Wikipedia
- List of honorary British knights and dames
- List of people who have declined a British honour
