= Allan Hall (journalist) =

British journalist

Allan Hall (10 December 1929 – 26 April 2001) was a British journalist.

Born in Hemsworth, Hall began his career in journalism with the Newcastle Journal, but soon moved to London. By the age of 27 he became editor of the Sunday Graphic for a year, then in 1959 became managing editor of the News Chronicle. In 1960, both papers closed, and Hall began writing a gossip column for the Daily Herald.

Hall remained a columnist as the Herald became The Sun, but left in 1969 when Rupert Murdoch bought the paper. He joined the Sunday Times, where he launched a lifestyle section before taking over the "Atticus" diary column. Having long had an interest in wine, being known for spending long lunches in the Connaught Rooms, he convinced editor Harold Evans to launch the Sunday Times Wine Club. By now writing regularly about wine, Hall decided in 1972 to organise an annual race to bring Beaujolais Nouveau to Britain, replicating a private race by Clement Freud (wine correspondent for The Sun) and Joseph Berkmann (agent for Georges Duboeuf) in 1970 and 1971. The race still takes place annually: the prize, a bottle of champagne, is awarded to the first competitor to arrive at The Sunday Times' offices.

In 1980, Hall moved to work for James Goldsmith's magazine NOW!, during which time he hosted a lunch at which fine wines were served. For this one meal he claimed, and was paid, expenses of more than £11,000. The magazine closed the following year, after which Hall retired to Suffolk, selling wine and offering tasting sessions. He continued writing about wine on a freelance basis, and organized wine tours of France.

Media offices
Preceded by Gordon McKenzie	Editor of the Sunday Graphic; 1958–1959	Succeeded by Robert Anderson
