= Barry Askew =

British journalist and editor

Barry Askew (13 December 1936 – 17 April 2012) was a British journalist, editor of several provincial papers, including the Lancashire Evening Post and briefly of the News of the World.

Askew grew up in Bakewell, Derbyshire. He became editor of the Matlock Meteor at the age of 21. Whilst working for the Lancashire Evening Post, he won the IPC National Press Awards Campaigning Journalist award in 1972, having become editor of the paper in 1969. At the Evening Post, Askew orchestrated investigations which uncovered abuses at Whittingham Hospital which started the ball rolling which ultimately led to the end of institutional care for people with mental illness. He went on to serve on the Davies Committee, set up in the wake of the Whittingham affair to reform hospital complaints procedures.

He also led investigations into police corruption which culminated in the sacking of Chief Constable, Stanley Parr. During this period, Askew also fronted successful TV programmes for BBC North including Ask Askew and Wait Awhile.

In 1979, a phone call intended for Askew and recorded by a receptionist at the paper's Fishergate headquarters created national headlines. Purporting to be the Yorkshire Ripper, a man with a Wearside accent referred to the unsolved murder of Joan Harrison, murdered in a derelict Preston garage in 1975. Seriously wrong-footing the police hunt, the phone call was later found to be a hoax. In 2006, a 49-year-old unemployed man, John Humble, was convicted of perverting the course of justice.

Askew was appointed as editor of the News of the World, partly on the recommendation of Harold Evans, editor of The Times. Arriving in Fleet Street in April 1981, he was by then the archetypal hard-drinking, hard-living hack, soon to be lampooned by Private Eye as "The Beast of Bouverie Street". With circulation of the News of the World in free-fall, his bold launch of a colour magazine quickly reversed the decline. However, behind the scenes he was enduring an increasingly fractious relationship with the paper's owner Rupert Murdoch. Matters soon came to a dramatic head over Sonia Sutcliffe, wife of the Yorkshire Ripper. Askew thought he had successfully negotiated a successful deal for her story, but suddenly the Murdoch coffers clanged firmly shut.

The final straw came when in early December, he came into conflict with the Queen after claiming that if Princess Diana felt harassed by press photographers she should send a servant out to shop for her. At the end of the month, he left the newspaper, and spent the rest of his career in various short-term provincial posts.

Askew also had a successful radio and television career, regularly presenting Granada Television's What the Papers Say. Not much is known of his private life, however, a secret relationship with a young Sheffield nurse did result in the birth of their son David in October 1965.

Media offices
Preceded by Kenneth Donlan	Editor of the News of the World; 1981	Succeeded by Derek Jameson
