= Cyril Lear =

British newspaper editor (1911–1987)

Cyril James Lear (9 September 1911 – 11 March 1987) was a British newspaper editor.

Lear grew up in Plymouth, where he attended the Hoe Grammar School. He went into journalism and worked at the Western Morning News from 1928, moving to the Torquay Times in 1932, the Daily Mail in 1934 and The Daily Telegraph in 1938.

During World War II, he served as a rifleman with the Queen's Westminsters, before obtaining a commission as a major in the Royal Berkshire Regiment. After the war, he was employed by the News of the World, rising to become Features Editor, Assistant Editor and then Deputy Editor. He finally served as Editor of the newspaper from 1970 and Editorial Manager from 1973.

Media offices
Preceded by Stafford Somerfield	Deputy Editor of the News of the World; 1960–1970	Succeeded by Phil Wrack
Preceded by Stafford Somerfield	Editor of the News of the World; 1970–1973	Succeeded by Peter Stephens
