= Stafford Somerfield =

British newspaper editor

Stafford William Somerfield (9 January 1911–14 January 1995) was a British newspaper editor.

== Early life ==
Born in Barnstaple to Albert George Somerfield and Bessie (née Rivett), Somerfield worked at the Express and Echo, then moved to London as a journalist on the Daily Telegraph and the News Chronicle. During World War II he served with the Gloucestershire Regiment, rising to become a major.

== Newspaper career ==
When the war ended, Somerfield joined the News of the World, and in 1960, he was appointed as its editor. He prioritised shocking stories and printed explicit details of Diana Dors and Christine Keeler's lives. He often fell into conflict with the Press Council, particularly after paying David Smith, chief prosecution witness in the Moors murders case, on condition that the suspects were convicted.

In common with the Carr family, Somerfield vociferously opposed Robert Maxwell's attempt to take over the News of the World and wrote a front-page leading article in October 1968 on the subject, which led to extensive criticism that his attitude was xenophobic. He objected to Rupert Murdoch's eventual purchase of a majority of the title's stock from the Carrs a few months later. He was asked to resign in February 1970 by Murdoch, now chairman of the company, and reportedly took an offer of £100,000 to leave.

== Later life ==
In retirement, he became a judge at Crufts and wrote columns on dog-related matters. He also wrote three books: the first was in 1950 after interviewing John George Haigh, the convicted murderer known as the 'Acid bath murderer'; then in 1979 he penned a story about his Fleet Street memories; and finally in 1985, a book about the Boxer, a breed he had an in-depth interest in. He was chairman of Dog World. Married first, 1934: Gertrude Frances Camfield, by whom he had two daughters. Divorced 1950. Married second, 1951, Elizabeth Egerton, daughter of Lt-Col Arthur Egerton Cotton, DSO, of the Rifle Brigade, a descendant of Sir Lynch Cotton, 4th Baronet, of Rev. Sir Philip Grey Egerton, 9th Baronet, and of Josias Du Pre, a director of the East India Company and Governor of Madras from 1770 to 1773. Elizabeth Somerfield's first husband, Francis Montgomery, was son of the politician and lawyer Robert Mortimer Montgomery.

Media offices
Preceded by Reg Cudlipp?	Deputy Editor of the News of the World; 1953?–1960	Succeeded by Cyril Lear
Preceded by Reg Cudlipp	Editor of the News of the World; 1960–1970	Succeeded by Cyril Lear
