= Sunday Graphic =

Weekly English newspaper

- Type: Sunday newspaper
- Format: Tabloid
- Owner(s): Allied Newspapers/Kemsley Newspapers (1925-1959), Thomson Newspapers Ltd. (1959-1960)
- Editor: Reginald Simpson (1935–1947)
- Founded: 1915; 111 years ago as the Sunday Herald
- Ceased publication: December 4, 1960; 65 years ago
- Headquarters: Fleet Street, London
- Sister newspapers: Daily Sketch (1927–1952)

The Sunday Graphic was a weekly English tabloid newspaper that was published in Fleet Street.

The newspaper was founded in 1915 as the Sunday Herald and was later renamed the Illustrated Sunday Herald.

It was acquired by Allied Newspapers in 1925; in 1927 it changed its name to the Sunday Graphic, becoming the sister paper of the Daily Sketch, which had recently taken over the Daily Graphic (and was renamed the Daily Graphic again from 1946 to 1952). In 1931 it was merged with the Sunday News.

The paper remained in the ownership of the Kemsley group after its daily sister paper was acquired by Associated Newspapers in 1952. In 1959 the Kemsley group, including the Sunday Graphic, was acquired by Roy Thomson, later Lord Thomson.

The Sunday Graphic ceased publication on 4 December 1960.

== Editors ==
- 1926: T. Hill
- 1931: Alan Sinclair
- 1935: Reginald Simpson
- 1947: M. Watts
- 1947: N. Hamilton
- 1948: Iain Lang
- 1949: A. J. Josey
- 1950: Barry Horniblow
- 1952: Philip Brownrigg
- 1953: Mike Randall
- 1953: Gordon McKenzie
- 1958: Allan Hall
- 1959: Robert Anderson
- 1960: Andrew Ewart
