= Gordon McKenzie (journalist) =

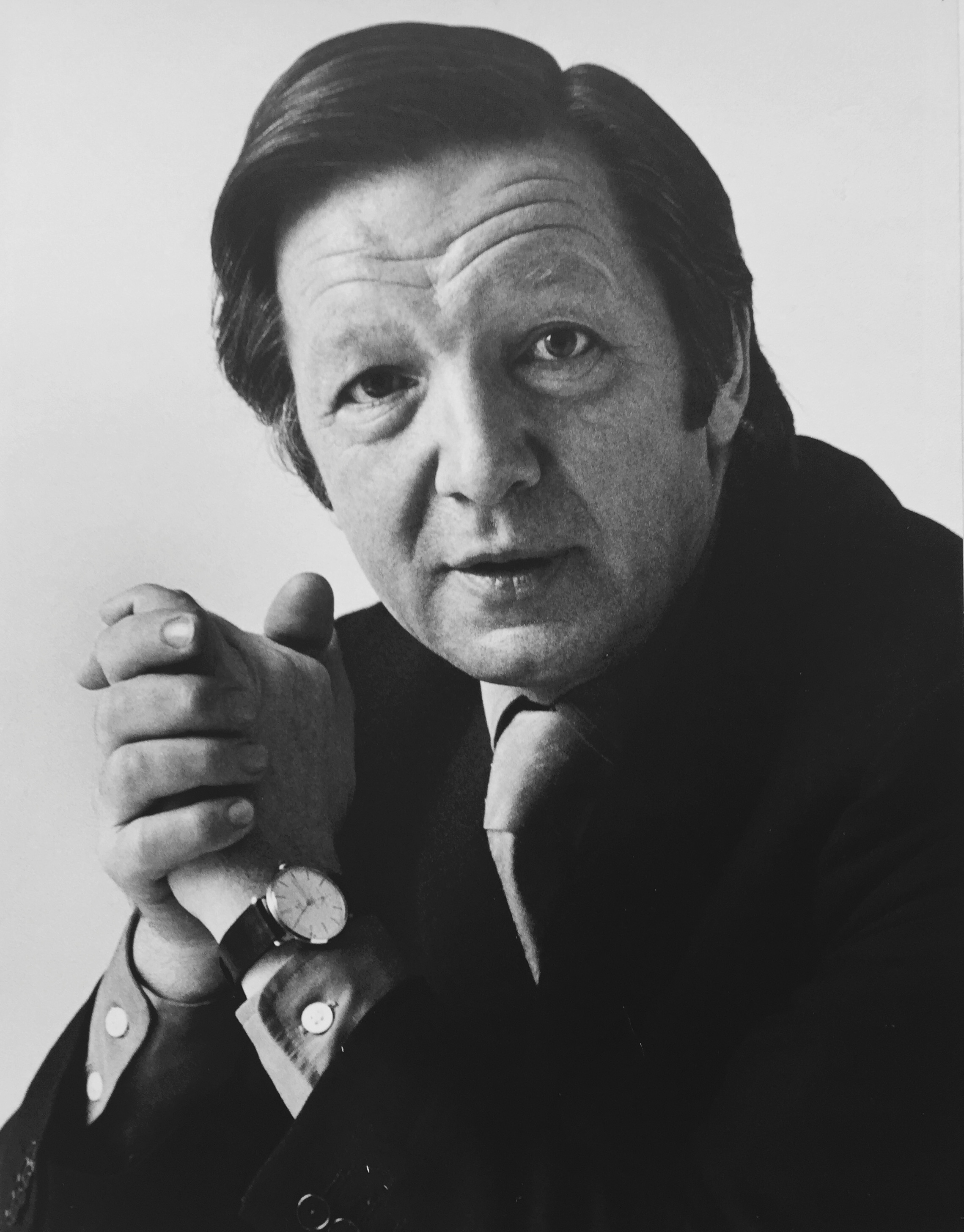
Gordon McKenzie journalist

(James) Gordon McKenzie (28 December 1917 – 3 December 1998) was a British journalist and editor who worked for much of his career at the Daily Mail rising to be the paper's executive editor.

Born in Cammachmore, Aberdeenshire, he started his career as a trainee reporter at the Aberdeen Bon Accord in 1935, later joining the Aberdeen Press and Journal before the outbreak of World War II.

He joined the Gordon Highlanders and was commissioned as an officer in 1941 into the Durham Light Infantry. He served in North Africa, Palestine and Italy where he was mentioned in dispatches and wounded in combat during the Battle of Monte Cassino in 1944. He finished his war service editing an English language paper in newly liberated Vienna. Returning to civilian life as the Press and Journal's London editor in 1947 he gained an exclusive interview with Queen Mary, the then Queen Mother, which brought him to the attention of Fleet Street. After working for Denis Hamilton, editorial director of Kemsley Newspapers and alongside the group's Foreign Manager Ian Fleming he was given his first editorship at the Sunday Chronicle in 1950: at the age of 33 McKenzie was Fleet Street's youngest editor. He then edited the Sunday Graphic from 1953-58 where his ideas and production flair attracted the attention of the then Lord Rothermere Esmond Harmsworth. He took up a new editorship at the Sunday Dispatch before moving to the Daily Mail in 1958 as assistant editor. He directed an internationally envied, intellectually diverse team of writers. Among them were Bernard Levin, Vincent Mulchrone, Shirley Conran, Godfrey Winn, Anne Scott-James, Quentin Crewe, Barry Norman and Lynda Lee-Potter. As executive editor in the 1970s and early 1980s, he headed the features department and was a key figure in the Femail marketing policy of attracting women readers without alienating its male readership.

He retired in 1983 as executive editor but continued in an advisory capacity at You magazine, as literary editor for the Mail as well as working on book serialisations almost until the end of his life.

McKenzie married actress Vicki Campbell in 1947 and the journalist Rod McKenzie is their son.

Media offices
Preceded by ?	Editor of the Sunday Chronicle; 1950–1952	Succeeded by John William Robertson
Preceded by Mike Randall	Editor of the Sunday Graphic; 1953–1958	Succeeded by Allan Hall
