= Kenneth Donlan =

British newspaper editor

Joseph Kenneth Donlan (27 September 1927 – 23 May 1994) was a British newspaper editor.

Donlan was born in Salford and worked for the Daily Mail for 25 years at their offices in London and Manchester. In 1971 he moved to rival tabloid The Sun where he became news editor. He was briefly editor of the News of the World from 1980 to 1981 before returning to The Sun as managing editor. In 1989, he became the first national newspaper ombudsman in the United Kingdom.

Donlan died at the age of 66 in Chislehurst.

Media offices
Preceded by Bernard Shrimsley	Editor of the News of the World; 1980–1981	Succeeded by Barry Askew
