= Jodi Hyland =

British magazine editor

The Right Honourable The Lady Cudlipp
- Born: Joan Latimer Hyland; 22 June 1920
- Died: 9 August 2017 (aged 97)
- Occupations: Journalist and magazine editor
- Spouse: Hubert Kinsman Cudlipp, Baron Cudlipp (m. 1963; died 1998)

Joan Latimer "Jodi" Cudlipp, Lady Cudlipp (née Hyland; 22 June 1920 – 9 August 2017) was a British journalist and magazine editor.

== Biography ==
Having reported for the Southport Visiter and Woman's Own, she served with the Auxiliary Territorial Service and at Bletchley Park during the Second World War. After the war, she moved into editing, and was editor of Debutante, Girl and Good Taste, before becoming assistant editor of Woman, the largest magazine by circulation in the United Kingdom. In 1960, she was asked to relaunch the Woman's Mirror, a magazine associated with the Daily Mirror, which she led for the next three years as editor. It would be her last independent job, as she stepped down as editor upon marrying Hugh Cudlipp, the editorial director of the Mirror Group, in March 1963.

During her marriage, she acted as "chauffeur, secretary and housekeeper" to her husband while he was chairman of the Mirror Group and then of International Publishing Corporation. When her husband was made a member of the House of Lords in 1974, she became Lady Cudlipp. They did not have any children, nor were there step-children from Hugh's two previous marriages. Following his death in 1998, she dedicated herself to his legacy and assembled an archive of his work.

== Selected works ==
- Cudlipp, Jodi (2010). The Sawdust Millionaire. Revel Barker. ISBN 978-0956368645.
