= Larry Lamb (newspaper editor) =

British newspaper editor

Sir Larry Lamb
- Born: Albert Lamb; July 15, 1929; Fitzwilliam, West Riding of Yorkshire, England
- Died: May 19, 2000 (aged 70)
- Occupation: Newspaper editor
- Spouse: Joan Grogan
- Children: 3

Sir Albert Lamb (15 July 1929 – 19 May 2000), commonly known as Larry Lamb, was a British newspaper editor. He introduced the Page 3 feature to The Sun (for which he was editor from 1969 to 1972, and then again from 1975 to 1981), which saw a dramatic increase in sale in the 1970s. He also applied the term 'Winter of Discontent' to the series of strikes over the winter of 1978–79. He was Deputy Chairman of News Group from 1979 but was transferred to the Western Mail in Australia in 1981, and edited The Australian in 1982.

== Early life ==
Lamb was born in Fitzwilliam, West Riding of Yorkshire, on 15 July 1929, the son of Henry Lamb, a colliery surface blacksmith, and Coronetta Small. Called Albert, he adopted the name Larry from the lamb in Toytown, a BBC Children's Hour radio series. Lamb's father died when he was ten years old.

Lamb was educated at Rastrick Grammar School, leaving school at the age of sixteen.

== Journalism career ==
Lamb was editor of The Sun from 1969 to 1972 and again from 1975 to 1981, and also of the Daily Express from 1983 to 1986.

He was northern editor of the Daily Mail in Manchester from 1968 until he was recruited by Rupert Murdoch to take over The Sun (recently bought from IPC). Lamb pioneered the paper's populist style, established the Page 3 feature, which he later regretted, and saw circulation dramatically increase. He insisted that Page 3 models were "nice girls", as "big-breasted girls look like tarts". He also applied the term 'Winter of Discontent' to the series of strikes over the winter of 1978–79.

He was Deputy Chairman of News Group from 1979 but was transferred to the Western Mail in Australia in 1981, and edited The Australian in 1982, where he was nicknamed "Sir Loin" by staff members. He left the Group in 1983 to work for the Daily Express. In 1985, during his time as editor of the Daily Express, Lamb declared that the unconditional release of Nelson Mandela, imprisoned ANC leader in apartheid South Africa, would be "a crass error". After standing down in 1986 he set up his own public relations company, Larry Lamb Associates.

== Personal life ==
Lamb was married to Joan Grogan, with whom he had two sons and a daughter.

Lamb was knighted in the Queen's 1980 Birthday Honours List on the recommendation of Margaret Thatcher.

His nickname was inspired by the Children's Hour character Larry the Lamb. After he received his knighthood, Private Eye magazine usually referred to him as "Sir Larrold Lamb."

Lamb died on 19 May 2000, aged 70. He had been in poor health since suffering a heart attack in 1992.

== In popular culture ==
Lamb is the lead character of Ink, a 2017 stage play focusing on Rupert Murdoch's acquisition of The Sun. The role was originated by Richard Coyle in the West End and Jonny Lee Miller on Broadway.

In 2026, Danny Boyle directed Ink, a biographical drama film, adapted by James Graham from his 2017 stage play. In the film, Lamb is played by Jack O'Connell.

Media offices
Preceded by Christopher Ward	Editor of Daily Express; 1983–1986	Succeeded by Sir Nicholas Lloyd
Preceded by Dick Dinsdale	Editor of The Sun; 1969–1972	Succeeded by Bernard Shrimsley
Preceded by Bernard Shrimsley	Editor of The Sun; 1975–1981	Succeeded by Kelvin MacKenzie
