= David English (editor) =

British journalist and newspaper editor (1931–1998)

Sir David English
- Born: 26 May 1931; Oxford, England
- Died: 10 June 1998 (aged 67); London, England
- Education: Bournemouth School
- Spouse: Irene Mainwood (m. 1954)
- Children: 3

Sir David English (26 May 1931 – 10 June 1998) was a British journalist and newspaper editor, best known for his two-decade editorship of the Daily Mail.

== Biography ==
English was born in Oxford, and educated at Bournemouth School. His father having died in 1930, young David developed a close relationship with his grandfather, Alf, who instilled in him a love of newspapers. David's mother, Kitty, was Assistant to the Post Master General in Bournemouth who was keen to see her son attend university, and upon learning that he would rather work in journalism, emphasised the negative aspects of that profession, in an attempt to dissuade him. However, aged 16 and encouraged by Alf, he joined the local Christchurch Times and then had a brief period with the News in Portsmouth, moving to London before he was 20.

English began his national newspaper career at the Daily Mirror in 1951. He made little impact there, and left in 1953 due to his poor relationship with news editor Ken Hord. At one point he worked at the left-wing Reynold's News and Sunday Citizen and, out of a burning desire to generate a front-page headline, garnered significant attention for attempted mail theft. He married Irene Mainwood in 1954, with whom he had two daughters and a son - Nikki, Amanda and Neil. He moved to the Daily Sketch in 1956, firstly as features editor and then editor, before moving to New York and the Sunday Dispatch, a sister paper to the Sketch, in 1959. He worked there briefly before finding a job at the Daily Express.

English took up the editorship of the Daily Mail in 1971, and was widely credited for turning the paper around following its decades-long stagnation. 1982 saw him help revive the Mail on Sunday following a rough launch. He was appointed a knight bachelor in the 1982 Birthday Honours. He continued as editor of the Mail until 1992, being followed by former Evening Standard editor Paul Dacre. This was to prevent Dacre from joining The Times following an offer from Rupert Murdoch. English became chairman and editor-in-chief of Associated Newspapers, parent company of both the Mail and the Standard. At the end of his career, he worked for the Press Complaints Commission, the Commonwealth Press Union and the National Council for the Training of Journalists. He also took up chairmanships of Teletext UK, Channel One TV and ITN. After the death of Princess Diana he had the English press agree to a new code of practice on privacy.

== Death ==
He suffered a severe stroke and was sent to St Thomas's Hospital, London on 9 June 1998, dying there the following day. He was due to be appointed a life peer, which instead became a Ghost Honour.

== Notes ==
- English, Sir David, (26 May 1931–10 June 1998), Editor in Chief, since 1989, and Chairman, since 1992, Associated Newspapers (Joint Deputy Chairman, 1989–92; Vice-Chairman, Associated Newspapers Group, 1986–88); Chairman, ITN, since 1997. Who's Who (published online, 1 December 2007)

Media offices
Preceded by Howard French	Editor of the Daily Sketch; 1969–1971	Succeeded by Louis Kirby
Preceded by Arthur Brittenden	Editor of the Daily Mail; 1971–1992	Succeeded by Paul Dacre
Preceded by Bernard Shrimsley	Editor of the Mail on Sunday; 1982	Succeeded by Stewart Steven
