= Marine Character Area =

Marine characterisation area of Wales

A Marine Character Area (MCA) is a marine geographic area around the Welsh coastline, designated by Natural Resources Wales for the purposes of characterising the key natural, cultural and perceptual influences on the defined area.

MCAs are part of the Welsh Government's response to the European Landscape Convention and the 2011 UK Marine Policy Statement (MPS), itself a response to the Marine and Coastal Access Act 2009. Welsh MCAs are described in a series of documents originated in 2014.

== List of Marine Character Areas ==
- MCA 1 Dee Estuary (Wales) (pdf)
- MCA 2 Colwyn Bay and Rhyl flats (pdf)
- MCA 3 Red Wharf and Conwy Bays (pdf)
- MCA 4 North Wales Open Waters (pdf)
- MCA 5 North-West Anglesey Open Waters (pdf)
- MCA 6 North Anglesey Coastal Waters (pdf)
- MCA 7 Holyhead Bay and the Skerries (pdf)
- MCA 8 West Anglesey Open Waters (pdf)
- MCA 9 Holy Island West and Penrhos Bay (pdf)
- MCA 10 Menai Strait (pdf)
- MCA 11 Caernarfon Bay (pdf)
- MCA 12 Llyn and South West Anglesey Open Waters (pdf)
- MCA 13 Llyn and Bardsey Island (pdf)
- MCA 14 Tremadog Bay and Dwyryd Estuary (pdf)
- MCA 15 Cardigan Bay North and Estuaries (pdf)
- MCA 16 Cardigan Bay (South) (pdf)
- MCA 17 Outer Cardigan Bay (pdf)
- MCA 18 West Pembrokeshire Coastal Waters and Islands (pdf)
- MCA 19 West Pembrokeshire Islands Bars and Inshore Waters (pdf)
- MCA 20 Irish Sea Offshore (pdf)
- MCA 21 Milford Haven (pdf)
- MCA 22 South Pembrokeshire Coastal and Inshore Waters (pdf)
- MCA 23 South Pembrokeshire Open Waters (pdf)
- MCA 24 Carmarthen Bay and Estuaries (pdf)
- MCA 25 Gower and Helwick Coastal Waters (pdf)
- MCA 26 Swansea Bay and Porthcawl (pdf)
- MCA 27 Glamorgan Coastal Waters and Nash Sand (pdf)
- MCA 28 Bristol Channel (Wales) (pdf)
- MCA 29 Severn Estuary (Wales) (pdf)
