= Donlan, West Virginia =

Unincorporated community in West Virginia, United States

- Unincorporated community
- Location within West Virginia Location within the United States
- Coordinates: 38°57′31″N 80°40′37″W
- Country: United States
- State: West Virginia
- County: Gilmer
- Elevation: 794 ft (242 m)
- Time zone: UTC-5 (Eastern (EST))
  - Summer (DST): UTC-4 (EDT)
- GNIS feature ID: 1549658

Donlan is an unincorporated community in Gilmer County, West Virginia, United States. Its post office is closed.
