= Bernard Shrimsley =

British newspaper editor (1931–2016)

Bernard Shrimsley (13 January 1931 – 9 June 2016) was a British journalist and newspaper editor.

== Early life ==
The son of John, a tailor’s pattern cutter, and his wife Alice, a homemaker, a Jewish couple who had migrated to the UK, Shrimsley (previously Shremski) was born in London. Educated at Kilburn Grammar School, along with his brother, Anthony, Shrimsley was evacuated to Northampton from London during the war, but had to go the police for a release as their guardians mistreated them.

== Career ==
=== Early career ===
After leaving school, he became a messenger at the Press Association in London. After a year, he was taken on as a trainee at the Southport Guardian in 1948 where he remained, apart from his National Service in the Royal Air Force, until 1953. He then had spells at the Manchester offices of both the Daily Mirror and the Daily Express, plus a brief period in the Daily Mirror's London headquarters.

=== Editorial roles ===
Shrimsley was appointed as the editor of the Liverpool Daily Post in 1968.

Appointed as deputy editor of The Sun newspaper in 1969 shortly before its relaunch as a tabloid, Shrimsley was recommended to new owner Rupert Murdoch by Larry Lamb, his immediate superior. The circulation of the paper doubled to 1.6 million in the first year. Shrimsley served in the same role until 1972. He became editor of The Sun that year. At The Sun he once asked for the photograph of a Page 3 model to be altered: "Nipples too fantastic; make nipples less fantastic". Years later in an interview, he said they "looked like a couple of plastic coat pegs".

Remaining in that post until 1975, he then took over the equivalent job at The Sun's Sunday sister title, the News of the World. During his time as editor of the News of the World, which was then still a broadsheet, its circulation declined by a million. Murdoch was urged by Shrimsley to re-launch the paper as a tabloid, a change which was not taken up by Murdoch at the time. Shrimsley ceased to be editor of the News of the World "by mutual agreement", according to an announcement from News Group Newspapers, in late April 1980.

Shrimsley was taken on by Associated Newspapers in 1980 to launch The Mail on Sunday, but Lord Rothermere, the chairman of Associated, did not discuss the appointment with David English, the editor of its sister title, the Daily Mail, who made Shrimsley's job difficult, refusing permission for any Mail writer to work for the new stablemate. Following its launch in May 1982, The Mail on Sunday's projected circulation of 1.25 million was not reached after ten issues and Shrimsley was dismissed. English succeeded him in July.

Shrimsley's former Murdoch colleague, (now Sir) Larry Lamb, was now editor of the Daily Express and chose Shrimsley as the title's assistant editor, a post he held from 1983 to 1986. After Lamb left the Express, Shrimsley served as its associate editor from 1986 to 1996.

=== Other roles ===
Shimsley advised Sir James Goldsmith's Referendum Party during the 1997 general election and wrote editorials for the Press Gazette from 1999 until 2002. He continued to write articles for the publication subsequently. Meanwhile, he had become the chair of the Press Council and served on the D-notice committee advising the media on stories concerning national security.

=== Authorship ===
Shrimsley wrote three novels after his retirement: The Candidates, Lion Rampant and The Silly Season (2003). The Silly Season, wrote Roy Greenslade in The Guardian, is a "fine piece of satire" about tabloid journalism which contains "considerable wit and verve". It contains "a thinly veiled portrait" of former Sun editor, Kelvin MacKenzie, combined with elements of the "self-publicising egoism" of Piers Morgan, then editor of the Mirror.

== Personal life ==
Shrimsley married Norma Porter in 1952 (died 2009); their daughter Amanda was a feature writer for the News of the World.

His younger brother, Anthony (1934–1984), was political editor of three national newspapers: the Sunday Mirror, The Sun and the Daily Mail, and editor of Sir James Goldsmith's short-lived news magazine Now!. His niece Emma and nephew Robert also became journalists.

Shrimsley died on 9 June 2016, aged 85.

Media offices
| Preceded by ? | Deputy Editor of The Sun; 1969–1972 | Succeeded by Peter Stephens |
| Preceded by Larry Lamb | Editor of The Sun; 1972–1975 | Succeeded by Larry Lamb |
| Preceded by Peter Stephens | Editor of the News of the World; 1975–1980 | Succeeded by Kenneth Donlan |
| Preceded by New position | Editor of the Mail on Sunday; 1982 | Succeeded by David English |
