= Hugh Cudlipp =

British journalist (1913–1998)

The Right Honourable The Lord Cudlipp OBE
- Born: Hubert Kinsman Cudlipp; 28 August 1913; Cardiff, Glamorgan, Wales
- Died: 17 May 1998 (aged 84); Chichester, West Sussex, England
- Education: Howard Gardens High School
- Occupations: Journalist; editor; publisher
- Employer(s): Daily Mirror (1950s & 1960s)
- Known for: Chairman, Mirror Group (1963–1967); Chairman, International Publishing Corporation (1968–1973)
- Title: Baron Cudlipp
- Spouses: Edith Parnell (m. 1936; died 1938) Eileen Ascroft (m. 1945; died 1962) Joan Latimer Hyland (m. 1963)
- Parent(s): William Christopher Cudlipp and Bessie Amelia (née Kinsman)
- Relatives: Percy Cudlipp (brother); Reginald Cudlipp (brother)

Hubert Kinsman Cudlipp, Baron Cudlipp, OBE (28 August 1913 – 17 May 1998), was a Welsh journalist and newspaper editor noted for his work on the Daily Mirror in the 1950s and 1960s. He served as chairman of the Mirror Group group of newspapers from 1963 to 1967, and the chairman of the International Publishing Corporation from 1968 to 1973.

== Life and career ==
Hugh Cudlipp was born in Cardiff, the youngest of three sons of William Christopher Cudlipp, a traveling salesman, and Bessie Amelia, née Kinsman. He left the Howard Gardens High School for boys (later Howardian High School) at the age of fourteen, working for a number of short-lived local newspapers before transferring at the age of sixteen to Manchester and a job on the Manchester Evening Chronicle. In 1932, aged nineteen, he moved to London to take up a position as features editor of the Sunday Chronicle. In 1935, he joined the staff of the Daily Mirror.

He was editor of the Sunday Pictorial (later renamed the Sunday Mirror) from 1937 to 1940 and 1946 to 1949. Between these two periods, he saw war service with the Royal Sussex Regiment, and was involved in the First Battle of El Alamein. He was head of the army newspaper unit for the Mediterranean from 1943 to 1946, and oversaw the launch of a British forces' paper, Union Jack, modelled on the US Stars and Stripes. He thereafter returned to the Daily Mirror and the Sunday Pictorial until 1949; when owing to disagreements with his then boss, Harry Guy Bartholomew, he left to take the post of managing editor of the Sunday Express for a two-year stint. By 1951, Bartholomew had left, replaced by Cecil King, who reappointed Cudlipp, and with whom Cudlipp enjoyed a good working relationship for many years.

In 1952, Cudlipp was made Editorial Director of the Sunday Pictorial and the Daily Mirror, in the period in which the latter sustained its position as one of the best-selling of British newspapers. Roy Greenslade identifies Cudlipp as the mastermind of the paper's editorial formula, responsible for design, choice of campaigns, gimmicks, stunts, and author of iconic headlines.

Cudlipp was Chairman of the Mirror Group of newspapers from 1963 to 1967, where he oversaw the 1964 launch, as a broadsheet, of The Sun. Intended to replace the failing Daily Herald, the choice of format was to prevent it encroaching on Daily Mirror sales. The paper was not successful and, in 1969, was sold to Rupert Murdoch, who turned it into a tabloid imitator of and competitor to the Daily Mirror; by 1978, it was outselling the Mirror.

From 1968 to his retirement in 1973, he was Chairman of the International Publishing Corporation. His brothers Percy Cudlipp and Reginald Cudlipp were also national newspaper editors.

Cudlipp was knighted in 1973 and created Baron Cudlipp, of Aldingbourne in the County of West Sussex in 1974. Initially a Labour peer, he joined the nascent Social Democratic Party in 1981.

In 1974, director/producer John Goldschmidt made the documentary film Telling It Like It Is: Cudlipp's Crusade, featuring Hugh Cudlipp about the "state of the nation", for ATV. The IBA insisted that the film was withdrawn from transmission so as not to conflict with legislation on broadcasting in periods just before general elections. The script of the film was instead published in sections by several newspapers. The film was finally transmitted on ITV after the election.

== Personal life and death ==
His first wife was Edith Parnell, who, in 1929, as a 16 year old schoolgirl, became the second person (and youngest person at the time) to swim across the Bristol Channel from Penarth to Weston-super-Mare. They married in 1936, although the marriage was not a success as she was simultaneously in love with Tom Darlow, editor of John Bull and kept up an affair with him. She died on 13 November 1938, aged 25, after complications from a Caesarean section in a Harley Street clinic.

His second wife, Eileen Ascroft, whom he married in 1945, died in 1962. The following year, he married Joan Latimer Hyland, who had been editor of the Woman's Mirror until their marriage; she died in August 2017.

== Death ==
Cudlipp died on 17 May 1998, aged 84, at his home in Chichester, West Sussex. He had been suffering from lung cancer.

== Legacy ==
After his death, his widow Joan joined with former colleagues from the British press to found the Cudlipp Trust with the aim of "education and furthering the interests and standing of journalism". The trust organises the annual Hugh Cudlipp Lecture and student journalism prize.

Between 1999 and 2004, the lecture was given at the London Press Club, then between 2005 and 2015, it was hosted at the London College of Communication. It returned to the London Press Club in 2016. Delivering the 2005 lecture, Michael Grade, the then Chairman of the BBC, described Cudlipp as "one of the giants of British journalism and one of its greatest editors."

The British Press Awards gives an annual "Hugh Cudlipp Award".

=== Hugh Cudlipp Lecture ===
The speakers for each year are as follows:

- 1999 Peter Carter-Ruck
- 2000 Bob Edwards
- 2001 Derek Jameson
- 2002 Geoffrey Goodman
- 2003 Piers Morgan
- 2004 Felicity Green
- 2005 Michael Grade
- 2006 Andrew Marr
- 2007 Paul Dacre
- 2008 Alastair Campbell
- 2009 Rebekah Wade
- 2010 Alan Rusbridger
- 2011 Lionel Barber
- 2012 Jon Snow
- 2013 Sir Harold Evans
- 2014 David Walsh
- 2015 Emily Bell
- 2016 Kevin Maguire
- 2017 James Naughtie
- 2018 James Harding
- 2019 George Osborne
- 2020 Robert Peston
- 2022 Roula Khalaf.

== Publications by Cudlipp ==
- Publish and be Damned: The Astonishing Story of the "Daily Mirror" (1953)
- At Your Peril: A mid-century view of the exciting changes of the Press in Britain, and a press view of the exciting changes of mid-century (1962)
- Cassandra at his Finest and Funniest (1967) - A collection of articles by the Mirror columnnist Cassandra (William Connor)
- Walking on the Water (1976) – an autobiography
- The Prerogative of the Harlot: Press Barons and Power (1980) – about William Randolph Hearst, Northcliffe, Rothermere the First, Henry Robinson Luce and Beaverbrook
- Cudlipp and be Damned! A 'British Journalism Review' collection of writing by Hugh Cudlipp to celebrate the centenary of the 'Daily Mirror' on 2 November 2003 (2003) – posthumous

The Oxford Dictionary of National Biography remarks that Publish and be Damned and At Your Peril were rumoured to be ghosted works.

Media offices
Preceded by David Grant; Stuart Campbell; Phil Zec	Editor of the Sunday Pictorial; 1938–40; 1946–49; 1952–53	Succeeded by Stuart Campbell; Phil Zec; Colin Valdar
