= Western Mail (Wales) =

Newspaper published in Wales

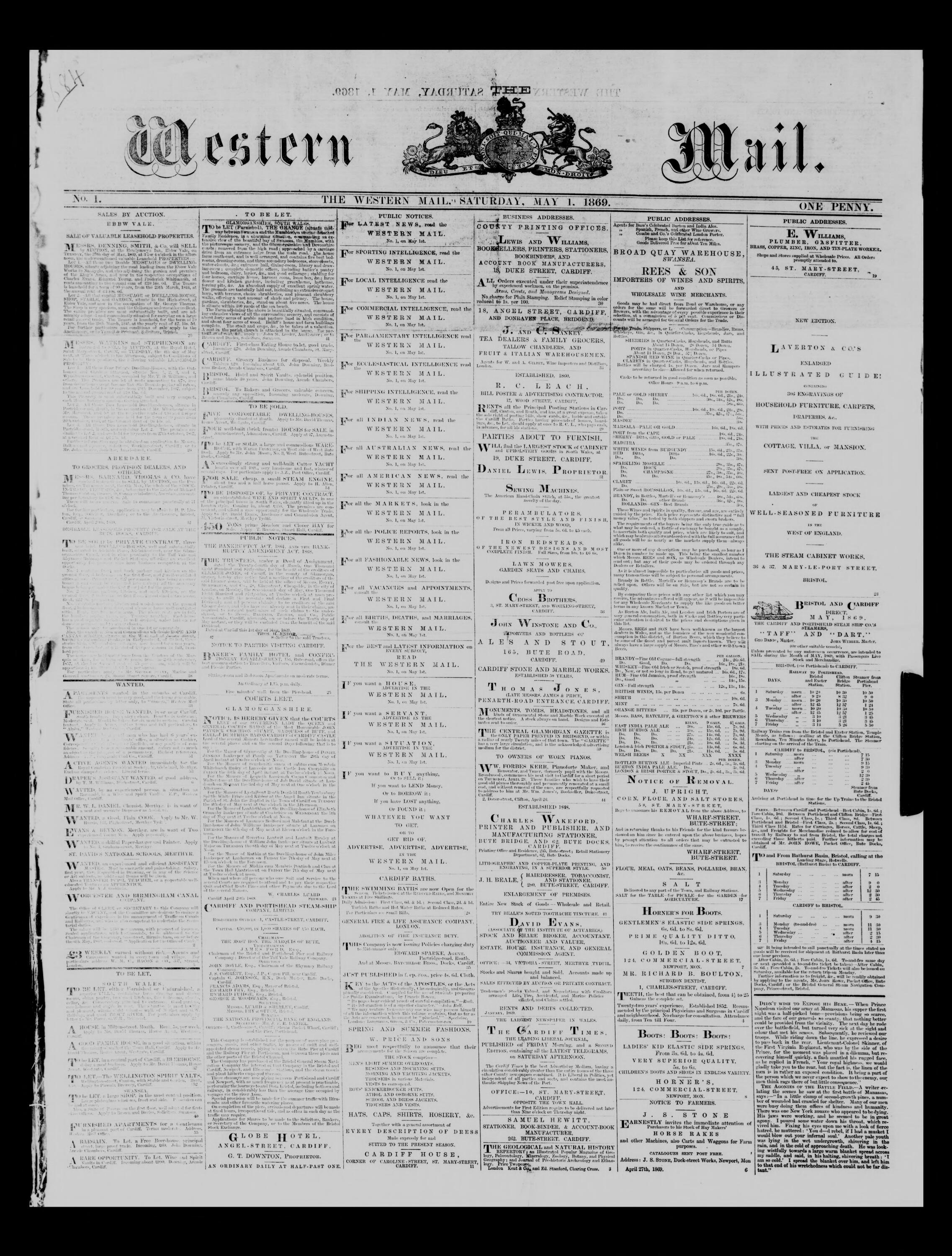
- Front page of the earliest surviving copy of the Western Mail; 1 May 1869
- Type: Daily newspaper
- Owner: Reach plc
- Founder: John Crichton-Stuart, 3rd Marquess of Bute
- Publisher: Media Wales
- Founded: 1869; 157 years ago
- Circulation: 5,271 (as of 2023)
- Website: walesonline.co.uk

The Western Mail is a daily newspaper published by Media Wales Ltd in Cardiff, Wales owned by the UK's largest newspaper company, Reach plc. The Sunday edition of the newspaper is published under the title Wales on Sunday.

It describes itself as "the national newspaper of Wales" (originally "the national newspaper of Wales and Monmouthshire"), although it has a very limited circulation in north Wales. The paper was published in broadsheet format until 2004, when it became a compact. It has an average circulation of 6,119 in 2022.

== Overview ==
Historically in South Wales the Western Mail has always been associated with its original owners, the coal and iron industrialists. Often this led to the paper being regarded with a considerable degree of enmity, especially during the strikes in the coal industry of the 20th century. This association between the newspaper and its owner was so strong there is still a degree of distrust of the paper in South Wales.

In contrast, and particularly following devolution, the newspaper has adopted a populist, localist, pro-Wales stance, mainly in trying to find a Welsh focus on major news stories. The newspaper has also stressed the community issues such as the closure of Welsh schools. The newspaper devotes a great deal of its coverage to Welsh rugby.

== History ==
The Western Mail was founded in Cardiff in 1869 by John Crichton-Stuart, 3rd Marquess of Bute as a Conservative penny daily paper designed to promote the Marquess' political aspirations. Henry Lascelles Carr (1841–1902), editor since 1869, bought the paper with Daniel Owen in 1877. Under Carr, and later William Davies, the paper became influential in Wales.

The paper was acquired in 1924 by the Allied Newspapers consortium, headed by the Welsh Berry brothers, William Berry, Lord Camrose, and Gomer Berry. The consortium quickly merged four other regional papers into the Western Mail. The paper later became part of Kemsley Newspapers and then, in 1959, Thomson Regional Newspapers.

In the mid-1950s, journalist David Cole (1928–2003) became editor at the age of only 27, the youngest editor of a UK daily newspaper at the time. He was later awarded a CBE for services to journalism and became chairman of Western Mail and Echo Ltd.

In the 1950s, Donald Woods, who later participated in the South African anti-apartheid movement and who publicised the events surrounding the secret death of activist Steve Biko, was employed as a reporter.

== See also ==
- Gareth Jones
- List of newspapers in Wales
