= Pride of Britain Awards =

British award ceremony for acts of bravery

- Awarded for: British people who have acted bravely or extraordinarily in challenging situations
- Location: Royal Hospital Chelsea (2020); Grosvenor House (2011–2019, 2021–present); The London Studios (2000–2010); Dorchester Hotel (1999)
- Country: United Kingdom
- Presented by: Carol Vorderman (1999–present); Ashley Banjo (2021–present)
- First award: 1999
- Website: prideofbritain.com

Television/radio coverage
- Network: ITV (2000–present)
- Runtime: 120 minutes (inc. adverts)
- Produced by: Tim Miller; Maia Liddell; Jeremy Phillips; Meriel Beale; Yvonne Alexander
- Directed by: Paul Kirrage

The Pride of Britain Awards is an annual award ceremony which has taken place in the United Kingdom since May 1999 and first televised on ITV in April 2000.

The awards honour British people who have acted bravely or extraordinarily in challenging situations and have been presented solely by Carol Vorderman since 1999, and co-presented by Ashley Banjo since 2021. Banjo had previously featured as the show's "roving reporter".

== History ==
The first Pride of Britain Awards were devised by Peter Willis, and held at the Dorchester Hotel in London in May 1999. They relocated to The London Studios in 2000, and then to the Grosvenor House Hotel from 2011.

On 20 October 2021, it was announced that Ashley Banjo would co-host with Carol Vorderman, beginning with the 23rd ceremony.

== Judges ==
The Pride of Britain Award winners are chosen by a panel of celebrities and well-known figures from a range of backgrounds, which has included Simon Cowell, Richard Branson, Fiona Phillips, Christine Bleakley, Magdi Yacoub, Richard Wallace, Eamonn Holmes and Aled Jones. The panel was chaired from 1999 to 2004 by Piers Morgan and from 2005 to 2006 by Peter Willis, founder of the awards.

== Sponsors ==
The awards are organised in association with the Daily Mirror, TSB, Lidl, ITV, Good Morning Britain and The King's Trust.

== Scottish version ==
In November 2020, it was announced that STV, Reach plc (owners of Daily Record) and TSB had agreed a deal which sees the Scottish broadcaster commission STV Studios to produce the inaugural Daily Record Pride of Scotland Awards, in partnership with TSB. The 90-minute landmark TV event was aired as the 2020 STV Hogmanay special, taking viewers into the New Year. The deal represents the broadcaster's biggest ever advertiser-funded single programme.

== Ceremonies ==
Episode	Air date	Viewers (millions)	Presenter(s)	Location
1	No broadcast		Carol Vorderman	Dorchester Hotel
2	12 April 2000	9.44	Carol Vorderman	The London Studios
3	11 April 2001	8.26	Carol Vorderman	The London Studios
4	6 March 2002	6.06	Carol Vorderman	The London Studios
5	4 March 2003	5.63	Carol Vorderman	The London Studios
6	16 March 2004	5.52	Carol Vorderman	The London Studios
7	11 October 2005	5.84	Carol Vorderman	The London Studios
8	7 November 2006	5.79	Carol Vorderman	The London Studios
9	10 October 2007	6.97	Carol Vorderman	The London Studios
10	1 October 2008	5.87	Carol Vorderman	The London Studios
11	7 October 2009	6.35	Carol Vorderman	The London Studios
12	10 November 2010	6.64	Carol Vorderman	The London Studios
13	5 October 2011	5.82	Carol Vorderman	Grosvenor House Hotel
14	30 October 2012	4.59	Carol Vorderman	Grosvenor House Hotel
15	8 October 2013	4.69	Carol Vorderman	Grosvenor House Hotel
16	7 October 2014	4.52	Carol Vorderman	Grosvenor House Hotel
17	1 October 2015	3.92	Carol Vorderman	Grosvenor House Hotel
18	1 November 2016	4.54	Carol Vorderman	Grosvenor House Hotel
19	7 November 2017	4.34	Carol Vorderman	Grosvenor House Hotel
20	6 November 2018	N/A	Carol Vorderman	Grosvenor House Hotel
21	5 November 2019	N/A	Carol Vorderman	Grosvenor House Hotel
22	1 November 2020	N/A	Carol Vorderman	Royal Hospital Chelsea
23	4 November 2021	TBA	Carol Vorderman; Ashley Banjo	Grosvenor House Hotel
24	27 October 2022	TBA	Carol Vorderman; Ashley Banjo	Grosvenor House Hotel
25	12 October 2023	TBA	Carol Vorderman; Ashley Banjo	Grosvenor House Hotel
26	24 October 2024	TBA	Carol Vorderman; Ashley Banjo	Grosvenor House Hotel
27	23 October 2025	TBA	Carol Vorderman; Ashley Banjo	Grosvenor House Hotel

=== 1999 ===
The first Pride of Britain Awards took place on 20 May 1999, however was not televised. It was held at the Dorchester Hotel in London, which was the one and only time the awards were held there.

Award	Winner	Awarded By
International Award	King Hussein of Jordan and Queen Noor	
Special Award	Doreen Lawrence	
Special Award	Neville Lawrence	
Special Award	Lennox Lewis	
Special Award	Helen Rollason	
Most Inspiring Young Sportsperson	Michael Owen	
Linda McCartney Award for Animal Welfare	Juliet Gellatley	
Outstanding Contribution	Mo Mowlam	
Entrepreneur of The Year	Richard Emanuel	
Inventor of The Year	The Viagra Scientists	
Pioneers of The Year	Richard Noble; Sqn. Ldr Andy Green	
Outstanding Bravery Award	Donna Marie McGillion	
Outstanding Bravery Award	Daniel Gallimore	
Outstanding Bravery Award	Helen Smith	
Outstanding Bravery Award	Michael McNally	
Child of Courage	Rhys Daniels	
Child of Courage	Charly Daniels	
Child of Courage	Sarah Dinsdale	
Child of Courage	Lucy-Rae Tamulevicus	
Fundraiser of the Year	Sandra Howard	
Lifesaver of the Year	Kevin Dingle, Mike Edkins, Paul Pollington	
Teacher of the Year	Helen Ridding	

=== 2000 ===
The 2nd Pride of Britain Awards were televised on ITV on 12 April 2000. It was the first time the awards were televised and held at The London Studios.

Award	Winner	Awarded By
Lifetime Achievement	Chad Varah	
Special Award	Tim Berners-Lee	
Special Award	The Heroes of Paddington	
Special Award	Mike and Fiona Thornewill, Catherine Hartley, Caroline Hamilton, Ann Daniels, Rosie Stancer, Zoe Hudson, Pom Oliver	
Special Award	Alison Moore	
Special Award	Ian Botham	
Outstanding Act of Bravery	Mark Taylor	
Outstanding Act of Bravery	Tom Tracey	
Outstanding Act of Bravery	Ron Dowson	
Beyond the Call of Duty	Dr Heather Clark	
Beyond the Call of Duty	Dr Alastair Mulcahy	
Child of Courage	Michaela Brown Charlotte Carter	
Neighbour of The Year	Kathy Cassidy	
Teacher of the Year	Gehane Gordelier	
Woman of Courage	Alison Taylor	
Linda McCartney Award for Animal Welfare	Irving Graham	
International Services to Britain	Gareth Evans; Balaram Rai	
Careworker of The Year	Jean Forrest	
Charity Fundraiser of The Year	Michelle Lewis	
Outstanding Achievement Award	Dr Michael Foale	

=== 2001 ===
The 3rd Pride of Britain Awards were televised on ITV on 11 April 2001.

Award	Winner	Awarded By
Lifetime Achievement	Peter Benenson	
Special Award	Ellen MacArthur	
Special Award	Tanni Grey-Thompson	
Special Award	Sara Payne; Michael Payne	
Special Award	Pat Campbell	
Special Award	Dr Rosemary Radley-Smith	Cilla Black
Innovation of The Year	David Marks; Julia Barfield	
Sportsperson of The Year	Steve Redgrave	
Linda McCartney Award for Animal Welfare	Carla Lane	
Outstanding Act of Bravery	Brian Krishnan	
Outstanding Act of Bravery	Michael O'Leary	
Beyond Call of Duty	PC Daran Gagin; PC Ian Thomson	
Child of Courage	Jamie Baxter	
Child of Courage	Rachel Edwards	
Child of Courage	Connor Carr	
Princes Trust Young Achiever Award	Matthew Graffham	
Teacher of the Year	Sab Sahota-Lyons	
Neighbour of The Year	Norah Peyton	
Fundraiser of The Year	Jill Farwell	
Conservation Award	Dot Beeson	

=== 2002 ===
The 4th Pride of Britain Awards were televised on ITV on 6 March 2002.

Award	Winner	Awarded By
Lifetime Achievement	John Sulston	Gordon Brown
Special Award	The Heroes of 11 Sep	
Special Award	Kirsty Howard	
Special Award	Margaret Jellet	
Outstanding Act of Bravery	Debby Dumigan	
Outstanding Act of Bravery	Richard Emmott	
Outstanding Act of Bravery	Anthony Peltier	
Child of Courage	Katie-Louise Beynon	
Child of Courage	Joseph Anderson	
Child of Courage	Sean McNally	
Child of Courage	Sophie Render	
Child of Courage	Sophie Knight	
Sportsperson of The Year	David Beckham	
Beyond Call of Duty	PC Simon Dell	
Neighbour of The Year	Steve Wardle	
Linda McCartney Award for Animal Welfare	Mark Glover	
Princes Trust Young Achiever Award	Emma Honey	
Teacher of the Year	Sandra Walton	
Fundraiser of the Year	Barbra White	
Carer of The Year	Jill McGowan	

=== 2003 ===
The 5th Pride of Britain Awards were televised on ITV on 4 March 2003.

Award	Winner	Awarded By
Neighbour of the Year	June Smith	
Teacher of the Year	Janet Bourne	
Fundraiser of the Year	Lloyd Scott	
Prince's Trust Young Achiever	Sarah Bennett	
Carer of the Year	Alex Bell	
Outstanding Bravery	Rosanne Ainslie, Janey McMahon & Cameron Sharp, Daniel Allen	
Child of Courage	Holly Lishman, Hollie Ashe, Ben Housson	
Beyond the Call of Duty	Dan Tanner	
Special Award	Caroline Hobbs, Bob French, Russel Ward	
Lifetime Achievement	Nicholas Winton	Alfred Dubs et al.

=== 2004 ===
The 6th Pride of Britain Awards were televised on ITV on 16 March 2004.

Award	Winner	Awarded By
Neighbour of the Year	Audrey Flash	
Teacher of the Year	Nesta Murray	
Fundraiser of the Year	Colin Osborne	
Prince's Trust Young Achiever	Kevin Johnston	
Carer of the Year	Birdie McDonald	
Outstanding Bravery	Rick Buckley, Lynsey Walters	
Child of Courage	Scott Muir, Danny Taylor, Cornel Hrisca-Munn, Terri Calvesbert, Michaela "Dolly" McCarthy	
Inspirational Sportsmen	England Rugby Squad	
Beyond the Call of Duty	'A' Flight, 202 Squadron, RAF Boulmer	
Special Award	Lydia Nash, Trooper Chris Finney, Rylstone WI, Leisha Hodgkinson	
Lifetime Achievement	Alec Jeffreys	

=== 2005 ===
The 7th Pride of Britain Awards were televised on ITV on 11 October 2005.

Award	Winner	Awarded By
Outstanding Bravery	Tony Baker, Julia O'Connor	
Child of Courage	Hope Farrelly, Cameron Weir, Shae Thomas, Ashleigh Huxley	
Neighbour of the Year	Lesley Pulman	
Prince's Trust Young Achiever	Mark Johnson	
Carer of the Year	Asmeret Tesfazghi	
Teacher of the Year	Liz Owens	
Outstanding Achievement	The 2012 Olympics Bid Team	
Beyond the call of duty	Emergency services, Transport & NHS staff - July 7 London bombings	
Special Award	The McCartney Sisters, Jane Tomlinson, Liz Carnell	
Inspirational Sportsmen	The England Cricket Team	
Outstanding Contribution	Richard Curtis	
Lifetime Achievement	Richard Carr-Gomm	

=== 2006 ===
The 8th Pride of Britain Awards were televised on ITV on 7 November 2006.

Award	Winner	Awarded By
Outstanding Bravery	Anthony Crompton, Daniel & Jason Rodd, Alan Forrester, Irene King	
Child of Courage	Katy Miles, Ollie Cartwright	
Fundraiser of the Year	Kirsteen Lupton	
Neighbour of the Year	Silla Carron	
Prince's Trust Young Achiever	Samantha Block	
Emergency Services	PC Mark Plant	
Carer of the Year	Stacey Heywood	
Teacher of the Year	Linda Davies	
Lifetime Achievement	Joe Mitty	
Special Recognition	Abigail Witchalls, Commando Squadron Royal Engineers, Piers Sellers, Beverley de-Gale & Orin Lewis	
Inspiring Personality	David Walliams	

=== 2007 ===
The 9th Pride of Britain Awards were televised on ITV on 10 October 2007.

Award	Winner	Awarded By
Outstanding Bravery	Robert Dunn, Glasgow Airport Workers	
Child of Courage	Lydia Cross, Megan Blunt	
Fundraiser of the Year	Chloe Gambrill	
Prince's Trust Young Achiever	Vicki Peters	
Emergency Services	Tam Brown	
Neighbour of the Year	Anne Glover	
Teacher of the Year	Pam Redican	
Lifetime Achievement	Magdi Yacoub	
Special Recognition	Henry Allingham, Sgt Michelle Cunningham and the EOD Unit, JK Rowling, Carol Miller, Peter Lachanudis & Susan Porter	
Inspiring Personality	Lewis Hamilton	

=== 2008 ===
The 10th Pride of Britain Awards were televised on ITV on 1 October 2008.

Award	Winner	Awarded By
Outstanding Bravery	Bernie Butler, Carl Duval	
Child of Courage	Nathan Thomson, Jaden Ashton, Tilly Griffiths, Liam Fairhurst	
Fundraiser of the Year	Nina Barough	
Prince's Trust Young Achiever	Ricky McCalla	
Emergency Services	RNLI Crew Torbay, Devon	
Local Champion	Tony Fowler	
Teacher of the Year	Pepe Rahman Hart	
Lifetime Achievement	Professor Robert Edwards	
Special Recognition	Medical Emergency Response Team, Juby Mathew, Carol Saldinack, Lance Corporal Matthew Croucher, Harry Gregg, Richard Taylor	
Inspiring Personality	Olympic Team GB	
NHS Heroes	Surgical Team, Royal Marsden Hospital	

=== 2009 ===
The 11th Pride of Britain Awards were televised on ITV on 7 October 2009.

Award	Winner	Awarded By
Outstanding Bravery	Sally-Ann Sutton, Michael Seery, Martin Langlands	
Child of Courage	Toni and Kelsey, Levana Hanson, Jake Peach	Vernon Kay, Tess Daly
Fundraiser of the Year	Major Phil Packer	
Prince's Trust Young Achiever	Chris Saunders	
Emergency Services	Rachel Farmer	
Local Champion	Eunice McGhie	
Teacher of the Year	Jonathan Heeley	
Lifetime Achievement	Peter Mansfield	
Special Recognition	Jasvinder Sanghera, UK Field Hospital Afghanistan, Doris Long, Noel Connolly, Kristin Hallenga	

=== 2010 ===
The 12th Pride of Britain Awards were televised on ITV on 10 November 2010.

Award	Winner	Awarded By
Fundraiser of the Year	Judy Ledger	
Young Fundraiser of the Year	Cameron Small	Cheryl Cole, Sarah Harding, Nicola Roberts and Kimberley Walsh
Neighbour of the Year	Mary Kelly	
Prince's Trust Young Achiever	Nathan James	
Emergency Services	PC David Rathband	
Teacher of the Year	Tachel Dixon	
Child of Courage	Aimee Dempsey, Kelsey Trevett	
Teenager of Courage	Ryan McLaughlin	Lord Alan Sugar
Special Recognition	British International Search and Rescue Team	
Outstanding Bravery	PC Colin Swan	
Outstanding Bravery	James Pout	
Lifetime Achievement	Battle of Britain Air Crew	
British International Search and Rescue Team	Simon Cording	

=== 2011 ===
The 13th Pride of Britain Awards were televised on ITV on 5 October 2011.

Award	Winner	Awarded By
Young Fundraiser of the Year	George Major	Gary Barlow, Dermot O'Leary and Tulisa Contostavlos
Teenager of Courage	Danielle Bailey	The Saturdays and Peter Andre
Teenager of Courage	McAyla Johnston	JLS
Special Recognition	Sergeant Dipprasad Pun	
Daybreak Emergency Services	WPC Kelli Walker; WPC Katie Harvey	
Prince's Trust Young Achiever	Gina Moffatt	
Fundraiser of the Year	Tom Lackey	Elle Macpherson
Outstanding Bravery	Ann Timson	
Outstanding Bravery	Lucy Gale	Michael McIntyre
Lifetime Achievement	Bob Woodward	Sue Johnston and Barry McGuigan
Child of Courage	Tom Phillips	Ant & Dec

Panel

- Christine Bleakley
- Peter Willis
- Johnson Beharry
- Gareth Jones (Retail Director of Shop Direct Group)
- Christine Beasley

=== 2012 ===
The 14th Pride of Britain Awards were televised on ITV on 30 October 2012.

Award	Winner	Awarded by
Child of Courage	Ramona Gibbs	Cast of The X Factor; Tulisa Contostavlos
Fundraiser of the Year	Flo & Jim Essex	Dawn French
Special Recognition	Jane & Michael Gates	David Cameron
Special Recognition	Katie Piper	June Brown; Ian McKellen
Special Recognition	Natalia Aggiano	Jon Bon Jovi
Special Recognition	Team GB and Paralympics GB	Prince Charles
Young Fundraiser of the Year	Jack Henderson	Rolf Harris
Teenager of Courage	Alice Pyne	Robbie Williams
Teenager of Courage	Jack Carroll	Emma Bunton; Melanie C Alan Carr
Daybreak's Emergency Services	Hartlepool RNLI and Coastguard	Cast of Downton Abbey; Aled Jones; Kate Garraway
Outstanding Bravery	Royston Smith & Alistair Neill	Ben Fogle; TBC
Outstanding Bravery	Corporal Carl Taylor	Myleene Klass; John Bishop
Prince's Trust Young Achiever	Jay Kamiraz	Pierce Brosnan; Prince Charles
ITV Local Heroes	Ann and Terry Panks	Paddy McGuinness; Holly Willoughby
Lifetime achievement	Doreen Lawrence	Natasha Kaplinsky; Mark Austin
Teacher of the Year	Alan Watkinson	Roy Hodgson; Mo Farah

Panel

- Peter Willis
- Aled Jones
- Mark Austin
- Carol Vorderman MBE
- Kelly Holmes
- Emma Bunton
- Tanni Grey-Thompson
- Jon Murphy
- Tim Miller
- Clare Gerada
- Lloyd Embley

=== 2013 ===
The 15th Pride of Britain Awards were televised on ITV on 8 October 2013.

Award	Winner	Awarded by
Child of Courage	Harley Lane	Nicole Scherzinger, Louis Walsh, Matt Richardson and Union J
Child of Courage	Bailie Kershaw	The Saturdays
Fundraiser of the Year	Jean Bishop	The stars of Strictly Come Dancing
Special Recognition	Matthew Wilson	
Special Recognition	The Hillsborough families	John Barnes and John Bishop
Special Recognition	Dan Black	
FA Football Champion	June Kelly	Michael Owen
Young Fundraiser of the Year	Martha Payne	Paul Hollywood and Mary Berry
Teenager of Courage	Malala Yousafzai	David Beckham
Daybreak''s Emergency Services	Paul Eastment, Chris Missen and Martin Blaker-Rowe	Michelle Collins and Helen Worth
Outstanding Bravery	Karin Williams	James Corden
Prince's Trust Young Achiever	Clifford Harding	
ITV Local Hero	Anne Scarfe	Christine Bleakley and Phillip Schofield
Lifetime Achievement	Ray Powles & Trevor Powles	David Cameron
Teacher of the Year	Sharon Gray	Jimmy Carr and Jack Carroll

Panel

- Mark Austin
- Carol Vorderman
- Denise Lewis
- Michael Owen
- Andrea Spyropoulos
- Chris Sims
- Aled Jones
- Marco Ivone (Head of Public Relations - Lidl GB sponsor)
- David Weir

=== 2014 ===
The 16th Pride of Britain Awards were televised on ITV on 7 October 2014.

Award	Winner	Awarded by
Outstanding Bravery	Andrew Bilton, Brian Keane & Joanne Keane	Jeremy Piven, Kara Tointon and Katherine Kelly
Outstanding Bravery	Agnes Malcolmson & Danny Turner	Donny Osmond and Myleene Klass
Child of Courage	Jack Mackay	Peter Capaldi
Child of Courage	Renee-Mai Bolter	Simon Cowell, Cheryl Fernandez-Versini, Louis Walsh, Sarah-Jane Crawford and Dermot O'Leary
Teenager of Courage	Cissy Adamou	Amanda Holden, Alesha Dixon and McBusted
ITV Fundraiser of the Year	Tony Phoenix-Morrison	**Christine Bleakley**, **Phillip Schofield**, Paul Hollywood, Jamie Oliver and Mary Berry
Young Fundraiser of the Year	Ted McCaffery	Olly Murs
Special Award for Outstanding Achievement	Tim Berners-Lee	David Cameron and Samantha Cameron
Good Morning Britain local hero	Betty McGlinchey	**Ben Shephard**, **Susanna Reid** and Bruce Forsyth
Emergency Services	Sara Widdrington	Ronnie Corbett and Alan Carr
Teacher of the Year	Ray Coe	John Bishop and Jimmy Carr
Prince's Trust Young Achiever	Georgia Hardie	Martin Clunes
Lifetime Achievement	Roy Calne	Paul O'Grady and Katie Piper
Special Recognition	Stephen Sutton	Jason Manford and Roger Daltrey
Special Recognition	Neil Laybourn	Russell Brand
Special Recognition	Steve Dayman	Ed Miliband and Justine Thornton
Special Recognition	Invictus Games Armed Forces Team	Nicola Adams, David Weir and Bradley Wiggins

- **BOLD** indicates the celebrities introduced the award

Panel

- Carol Vorderman
- Susanna Reid
- Ben Shephard
- Bernard Hogan-Howe
- Andrea Spyropoulos
- Nicola Adams
- Sharon Gray

=== 2015 ===
The 17th Pride of Britain Awards were televised on ITV on 1 October 2015.

Award	Winner	Awarded by
Outstanding Bravery	Peter Fuller	Phillip Schofield and Holly Willoughby
Outstanding Bravery	Dee Patel	Amanda Holden, Alesha Dixon and David Hasselhoff
Child of Courage	Bailey Matthews	Tom Daley, Rebecca Adlington, Greg Rutherford and Victoria Pendleton
Child of Courage	Joshua Williamson	Little Mix and Roy Hodgson
Teenager of Courage	Sohana Collins	Rupert Grint and David Beckham
ITV Regional Fundraiser	Paula Maguire	Ruth Langsford and Eamonn Holmes
Young Fundraiser of the Year	Amelia Gebruers	Simon Cowell, Rochelle Humes, Melvin Odoom, Cheryl Fernandez-Versini, Caroline Flack and Nick Grimshaw
Good Morning Britain local hero	Alice Burke	**Susanna Reid**, **Ben Shephard**, Boris Johnson and Barbara Windsor
Emergency Services	Major David Cooper, Tom Waters and Dr Ben Clark	Richard Hammond and Jimmy Carr
Teacher of the Year	Elaine Wyllie	Gordon Ramsay and Ryan Thomas
Prince's Trust Achiever	Duane Jackson	Sharon Osbourne and Ozzy Osbourne
Special Recognition	Joanne and Dan Thompson	Katherine Kelly and Jeremy Piven
Special Recognition	British Ebola Aid Effort	Lenny Henry and Suranne Jones
Special Recognition	Fred and Vivienne Morgan	Geri Halliwell and Bruce Forsyth
Special Recognition	Jess Evans and Mike Houlston	Peter Andre and Anita Rani
Special Recognition	Walking with the Wounded	

- **BOLD** indicates the celebrities introduced the award

Panel

- Carol Vorderman
- Ben Shephard
- Susanna Reid

=== 2016 ===
The 18th Pride of Britain Awards were held on 31 October 2016 and were televised on ITV on 1 November 2016. Carol Vorderman returned to present the ceremony.

Award	Winner	Awarded by
Outstanding Bravery	William Edwards	
Child of Courage	Dylan Graves	Phil Neville, Jamie Redknapp, Olly Murs and Louis Tomlinson
Child of Courage	Tilly Sawford	Little Mix
Child of Courage	Nikki Christou	Mary Berry, Jamie Oliver and Candice Brown
TSB Community Partner	Billy Muir	Johnny Vegas and Alesha Dixon
ITV's Fundraiser of the Year	Ben Smith	Fay Ripley and John Thomson
Good Morning Britain Young Fundraiser	Rhea Kara	**Ben Shephard**, **Susanna Reid**, Ant & Dec, Geri Halliwell and Emma Bunton
This Morning Emergency Services	Dr Simon Walsh, Dr Samy Sadek and paramedics Bill Leaning, Sam Margetts and Dean Bateman	**Phillip Schofield**
Prince's Trust Young Achiever	Francesca Brown	Prince Charles
Lifetime Achievement	Stephen Hawking	Theresa May
Special Recognition	David Nott	**Mark Austin**
Special Recognition	Karen Johnson	Gary Barlow, Howard Donald and Mark Owen
Special Recognition	Team GB and Paralympics GB	
Special Recognition	Simon and Ted McDermott	Cliff Richard and Joan Collins
Special Recognition	The Groves family	Ross Kemp and Barbara Windsor

Panel

- Ben Shephard
- Susanna Reid
- Ruth Langsford
- Katie Piper
- Chris Hoy
- Mark Austin
- Sam Allardyce
- Lloyd Embley

=== 2017 ===
The 19th Pride of Britain Awards were televised on ITV on 7 November 2017, with Carol Vorderman as host. Ashley Banjo served as a roving reporter.

Award	Winner	Awarded by
Outstanding Bravery	PC Keith Palmer, PC Wayne Marques, PC Charlie Guenigault	Theresa May, Jeremy Corbyn & Vince Cable
Child of Courage	Suzie McCash	Liam Payne & Jamie Oliver
Teenager of Courage	Moin Younis	Gareth Southgate, Jermain Defoe & Jamie Vardy
TSB Community Partner	Fraser Johnston	Paddy McGuinness, Jimmy Carr & Jason Manford
ITV's Fundraiser of the Year	Jake Coates	Amanda Holden & Joan Collins
Good Morning Britain Young Fundraiser	George Mathias	**Ben Shephard**, **Susanna Reid**, Dermot O'Leary, Sharon Osbourne, Louis Walsh & Nicole Scherzinger
This Morning Emergency Services	Grenfell firefighters	**Phillip Schofield**, **Holly Willoughby**, Prince William
Prince's Trust Young Achiever	Katie Walker	Rod Stewart & Penny Lancaster
Lifetime Achievement	Dr Paul Stephenson	Lenny Henry
Special Recognition	Prof Lorna Dawson	Katherine Kelly, Stephen Tompkinson & Neil Dudgeon
Special Recognition	Grenfell community	Prince William
Special Recognition	Manchester medics	Prince William & Ed Sheeran
Special Recognition	Sarah Hope	Sharon Osbourne & Ozzy Osbourne
Special Recognition	Dilys Price	Stars of Strictly Come Dancing 2017

Panel

- Ben Shephard
- Susanna Reid
- Kadeena Cox
- Eamonn Holmes
- Katie Piper
- Jane Cummings
- Lloyd Embley

=== 2018 ===
The 20th awards were televised on ITV on 6 November 2018, again with Carol Vorderman and Ashley Banjo. The winners were:

Award	Winner	Awarded by
Outstanding Bravery	British Cave Rescue Team: John Volanthen, Rick Stanton, Jason Mallinson, Chris Jewell, Josh Bratchley & Connor Roe; For the Tham Luang cave rescue	Tim Peake & Brian Cox
Child of Courage	Max Johnson	Theresa May (filmed segment), Jeremy Corbyn, Olly Murs and Ellie Goulding
Child of Courage	Ella Chadwick	X-Factor judges
Teenager of Courage	Joe Rowlands	
TSB Community Partner	Icolyn Smith	Strictly Come Dancing judges
ITV's Fundraiser of the Year	Margaret Wadsworth (British Legion)	Cliff Richard & Rochelle Humes
Good Morning Britain Young Fundraiser	Edward Mills	John Bishop et al.
This Morning Emergency Services	West Midlands Fire Service	
Prince's Trust Young Achiever	Omar Sharif	Anthony Joshua
Lifetime Achievement	Eddie O'Gorman of Children with Cancer UK	Paul O'Grady
Special Recognition	Emma Picton-Jones	
Special Recognition	Men & Women of the RAF	

=== 2019 ===
The 2019 awardees were:

Award	Winner
Child Of Courage	Jaydee-Lee Dummett
Special Recognition	Margaret Walker
Child Of Courage	Dante Marvin
Child Of Courage	Ben Hedger
Special Recognition	Josh Littlejohn and Alice Thompson
Lifetime Achievement	Elizabeth Anionwu
Prince's Trust Young Achiever	Hezron Brown
Emergency Services	Stevie Bull
Young Fundraiser Of The Year	Aaron Hunter
TSB Community Partner	Ben Clifford
Fundraiser Of The Year	Jamie McDonald
Outstanding Bravery Award	Daniel Nicholson and Joel Snarr

=== 2020 ===
On 23 April 2020, a special award was given to Captain Tom Moore for his fund-raising efforts during the COVID-19 pandemic.

The 2020 awards proper were televised on ITV on 1 November 2020.

Award	Winner
Child Of Courage	Sebastian Williams
Child Of Courage	Emmie Narayn-Nicholas
Special Recognition	Rhian Mannings
Special Recognition	Captain Sir Tom Moore
Special Recognition	NHS Frontline Heroes (includes every NHS worker in the United Kingdom)
Special Recognition	Marcus Rashford
Special Recognition	Lord Herman Ouseley
Lifetime Achievement	Ben Helfgott
Prince's Trust Young Achiever	Rebecca Beattie
This Morning Emergency Services	PC Claire Bond
Good Morning Britain Young Fundraiser	Tony Hudgell
TSB Community Partner	Dena Murphy
ITV Fundraiser	Major Chris Brannigan

=== 2021 ===
The 2021 awards proper were televised on ITV on 4 November 2021. Ashley Banjo was introduced as Vorderman's co-presenter.

Guest Performance: Westlife - My Hero

Award	Winner
Child Of Courage	Harmonie-Rose Allen
Spirit Of Adventure	Max Woosey
Special Recognition	Rob Allen
Special Recognition	Gee Walker
Special Recognition	Oxford Vaccine Team
Environmental Champion	Amy and Ella Meek
Lifetime Achievement	Rosemary Cox
Prince's Trust Young Achiever	Hassan Alkhawam
This Morning Emergency Services Award	Stephen Wharton
Good Morning Britain Young Fundraiser	Hughie Higginson and Freddie Xavi
TSB Community Heroes	Rebecca Carless and Jamie McCallum
ITV Fundraiser	Mark Ormrod

=== 2022 ===
The 2022 awards ceremony aired on ITV on 27 October 2022 and was hosted by Carol Vorderman and Ashley Banjo

Live performance: Joel Corry and Tom Grennan - Lionheart (Fearless)

Award	Winner
Spirit of Freedom	The People of Ukraine
Good Morning Britain Young Fundraiser of the Year	Tobias Garbutt Weller
Teenager Of Courage	Lucy Montgomery
Inspiration Award	The Lionesses
Princes’ Trust Young Achiever	Alex Anderson
Special Recognition	3 Dads Walking
This Morning Emergency Services Award	PC James Willetts and PC Leon Mittoo
Outstanding Bravery	David Groves and Alex Harvey
Child of Courage	Elizabeth Soffe
Lifetime Achievement	Jill Allen-King
TSB Community Hero	Michelle Donnelly
ITV Fundraiser of the Year	Sandra Blockley

=== 2023 ===
The 2023 awards ceremony aired on ITV on 12 October 2023 and was again hosted by Vorderman and Banjo. Winners included:

Award	Winner
Good Morning Britain Young Fundraiser of the Year	Jack Rigby
Princes’ Trust Young Achiever	Tskenya-Sarah Frazer
Special Recognition	Alan Bates; Rob & Lindsey Burrow and Kevin Sinfield
This Morning Emergency Services Award	Duncan Tripp
Outstanding Bravery	John Rastrick
Child of Courage	Freya Harris; Ravi Adelekan
Lifetime Achievement	Averil Mansfield
TSB Community Hero	Marie Benton
ITV Fundraiser of the Year	John Burkhill
Outstanding Contribution	The Windrush Generation Award accepted by Alford Gardner, Lloyd Coxsone, Joseph Mowlah-Baksh, Guy Bailey and Vernesta Cyril

=== 2024 ===
The 2024 awards ceremony aired on ITV on 24 October 2024 and was hosted by Carol Vorderman and Ashley Banjo.

Award	Winner
TSB Community Hero	Agnes Nisbett
Child of Courage	Aiyla Mota
Special Recognition	Andy Evans, Jason Evans and Michelle Tolley
Special Recognition	Diana Parkes and Hetti Barkworth-Nanton
Outstanding Bravery	Emily Greenwood
Child of Courage	Florrie Bark
Special Recognition	Hari Budha Magar
Emergency Services	Hewitt Clark
Good Morning Britain Young Fundraiser of the Year	Jacob Newson
ITV Fundraiser	Manny Singh Kang
King's Trust Young Achiever	Molly Leonard
Lifetime Achievement	Sheila Reith

=== 2025 ===
The 2025 winners were:

Award	Winner
Special Recognition	Asha Ali Rage
Good Morning Britain Young Fundraiser	Georgie Hyslop
King's Trust Young Achiever	Harry Byrne
P&O Cruises Inspiration Award	Javeno Mclean
ITV Fundraiser of the Year	Joanne Harris
Special Recognition	Leanne Pero
Child of Courage	Luke Mortimer
Special Recognition	Marcus Skeet
Outstanding Bravery	PC Yasmin Mechem-Whitfield, PC Cameron King and Inspector Moloy Campbell
Lifetime Achievement	Sally Becker
This Morning Local Heroes	Ups & Downs (theatre group for young people with Down syndrome and their families)
Teenager of Courage	Zach Eagling

=== 2026 ===
The 2026 winners were:

Award	Winner	Awarded by
Outstanding Bravery	Andrew Franks	Robert Rinder & Denise Lewis
Lifetime Achievement	Asif Hasan	Anna Friel & Philip Glenister
ITV Fundraiser of the Year	Barry Walden	Al Murray & Sue Johnston
King's Trust Young Achiever	Brandon Hulcoop	Jerry Hall & Tim Peake
Special Recognition	Dr. Eleanor Prior	Celia Imrie
P&O Cruises Inspiration Award	Elaine Oakey	Lucy Bronze & Jordan North
Special Recognition	Elaine Roberts & Luke Ambler	Andy Burnham
Special Recognition	Ellen Roome, Esther Ghey & Ian Russell	Martin Lewis
This Morning Local Hero	Florence Coke	Cast of Strictly Come Dancing
Good Morning Britain Young Fundraiser of the Year	Gregor Corse	Pete Wicks & Sam Thompson
Child of Courage	Kirsty Waugh	Amber Davies & Danny Jones
Child of Courage	Zac Howells	Jack Grealish
