= Lloyd Embley =

British newspaper editor

Lloyd Embley (born 16 March 1966, Birmingham) is a British former newspaper editor.

Embley attended Malvern College, a public school, and later entered journalism, working at the Daily Mirror. He served as Assistant Night Editor from 1999, Night Editor from 2001, and then Assistant Editor from 2004, before his appointment as Editor of The People in 2008. In May 2012, following the sacking of Richard Wallace and Tina Weaver, he was named as editor of both the Daily Mirror and the Sunday Mirror. In October 2012, as part of a restructuring of the parent company Trinity Mirror, he was promoted to editor-in-chief of the group.

In September 2017, Embley was placed at number 79 on commentator Iain Dale's list of 'The 100 Most Influential People on the Left'.

Media offices
Preceded by Mark Thomas	Editor of The People; 2008–2012	Succeeded by James Scott
Preceded by Richard Wallace	Editor of the Daily Mirror; 2012–2016	Succeeded by Peter Willis
Preceded by Tina Weaver	Editor of the Sunday Mirror; 2012–2016	Succeeded by Gary Jones
