= Murder of Joanna Yeates =

2010 event in the west of England

Joanna Yeates
- Graduation photo of Yeates
- Born: 19 April 1985; Ampfield, Hampshire, England
- Died: 17 December 2010 (aged 25); Clifton, Bristol, England
- Cause of death: Strangulation
- Body discovered: 25 December 2010; Failand, Somerset, England
- Resting place: Ampfield, Hampshire, England
- Occupation: Landscape architect
- Known for: Murder victim
- Height: 5 ft 4 in (163 cm)

Joanna Clare Yeates (19 April 1985 – 17 December 2010) was a landscape architect from Ampfield, Hampshire, England, who went missing from the flat she shared with her partner in Clifton, Bristol, on 17 December 2010 after an evening out with colleagues. Following a highly publicised appeal for information on her whereabouts and intensive police enquiries, her body was discovered on 25 December 2010 in the nearby village of Failand, North Somerset. A post-mortem examination determined that she had been strangled.

The murder inquiry was one of the largest police investigations ever undertaken in the Bristol area. The case dominated news coverage in the United Kingdom around the Christmas period as Yeates's family sought assistance from the public through social networking services and press conferences. Rewards amounting to £60,000 were offered for information leading to those responsible for Yeates's death. The police initially suspected and arrested Christopher Jefferies, Yeates's landlord, who lived in another flat in the same building. He was subsequently released without charge, but was vilified in the press.

Vincent Tabak, a 32-year-old Dutch architectural engineer and the occupant of a third flat in the building, was arrested on 20 January 2011. Media attention at the time centred on the filming of a re-enactment of her disappearance for the BBC's programme Crimewatch. After two days of questioning, Tabak was charged on 22 January 2011 with Yeates's murder. On 5 May, he pleaded guilty to Yeates's manslaughter, but denied murdering her. His trial started on 4 October; he was found guilty of murder on 28 October, and sentenced to life imprisonment with a minimum term of 20 years.

The nature of press reporting on aspects of the case led to legal proceedings against several UK newspapers. Libel action was brought by Jefferies against eight publications over their coverage of his arrest, resulting in the payment to him of substantial damages. The Daily Mirror and The Sun were found guilty of contempt of court for reporting information that could prejudice a trial.

A memorial service was held for Yeates at the parish church of Christ Church, Clifton Down, in the Bristol suburb where she had lived; her funeral took place at St Mark's church near the family home in Ampfield, Hampshire. Several memorials were planned, including one in a garden she had been designing for a new hospital in Bristol.

== Background and disappearance ==
Joanna Clare Yeates was born on 19 April 1985 to David and Teresa Yeates in Hampshire, England. Her maternal grandmother was Gwen Troake, who won the Cook of the Realm competition and was selected to appear on The Big Time in 1976, where her menu was notably criticised by Fanny Cradock. She was privately educated at Embley Park near Romsey. Yeates studied for her A-levels at Peter Symonds College and graduated with a degree in landscape architecture from Writtle College. She received her postgraduate diploma in landscape architecture from the University of Gloucestershire.

In December 2008, Yeates met 25-year-old architect Greg Reardon at the firm Hyland Edgar Driver in Winchester. The couple moved in together in 2009, and settled in Bristol when the company moved there. Yeates later changed jobs to work at the Building Design Partnership in Bristol. Yeates and Reardon moved into a flat at 44 Canynge Road, a large house that had been subdivided into several such flats, in the city's Clifton suburb in October 2010.

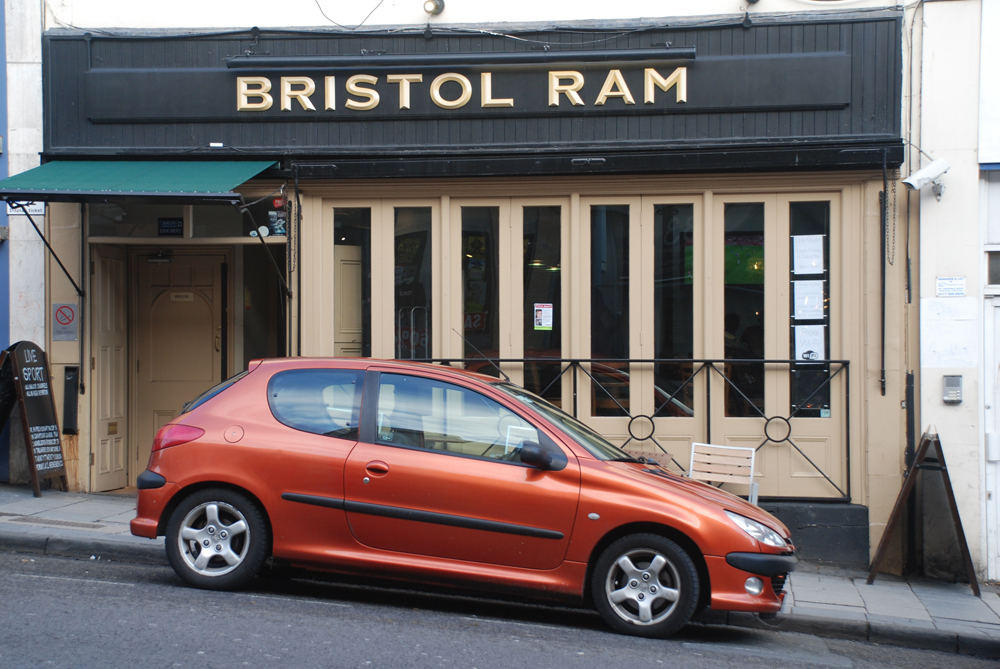
The Bristol Ram pub, where Yeates was last seen by her colleagues.

At approximately 8:00 pm on 19 December 2010, Reardon returned home from a weekend visit to Sheffield to find Yeates absent from their flat. Reardon had been trying to contact her by phone and text, but without success. While awaiting Yeates's return, Reardon called her again, but her mobile phone rang from a pocket of her coat, which was still in the flat. He found that her purse and keys were also at the flat, and that their cat appeared to have been neglected. Shortly after half past midnight, Reardon contacted the police and Yeates's parents to report her missing.

Investigators determined Yeates had spent the evening of 17 December 2010 with colleagues at the Bristol Ram pub on Park Street, leaving at around 8:00 pm to begin the 30-minute walk home. She told friends and colleagues that she was not looking forward to spending the weekend alone as it would be her first in the flat without Reardon; she planned to spend her time baking in preparation for a party the couple would be throwing the following week, and shopping for Christmas.

Yeates was seen on closed-circuit television (CCTV) at around 8:10 pm leaving a Waitrose supermarket without purchasing anything. She phoned her best friend, Rebecca Scott, at 8:30 pm to arrange a meeting on Christmas Eve. The last known footage of Yeates recorded her buying a pizza from a branch of Tesco Express at around 8:40 pm. She had also bought two small bottles of cider at a nearby off-licence, Bargain Booze.

== Search, public appeal, and discovery of body ==
Reardon and Yeates's friends set up a website and used social networking services to help look for her. On 21 December 2010, Yeates's parents and Reardon made a public appeal for her safe return at a police press conference. In another press conference, broadcast live on 23 December by Sky News and BBC News, Yeates's father David commented on her disappearance: "I think she was abducted after getting home to her flat ... I have no idea of the circumstances of the abduction because of what was left behind ... I feel sure she would not have gone out by herself leaving all these things behind and she was taken away somewhere". Detectives found no sign of the pizza she had bought, nor of its packaging. Both bottles of cider were found in the flat, one of them partially consumed. As there was no evidence of forced entry or a struggle, investigators began to examine the possibility that Yeates may have known her abductor.

Yeates's body was found in Failand, Somerset, eight days after she was last seen alive in Bristol.

On 25 December, a fully clothed body was found in the snow by a couple walking their dogs along Longwood Lane near a golf course and next to the entrance of a quarry in Failand, approximately 3 miles (4.8 km) from her home. The body was declared by police as that of Yeates. Reardon and the Yeates family visited the site of the discovery on 27 December. David Yeates said that the family "had been told to prepare for the worst" and expressed relief that his daughter's body had been recovered. Funeral arrangements were delayed as investigators retained the body. The pathologist Nat Carey consented to the release of the body on 31 January 2011.

== Investigation ==
The investigation, called "Operation Braid", comprised 70 detectives, uniformed officers and civilian staff under the direction of Detective Chief Inspector Phil Jones, a senior officer with Avon and Somerset Constabulary's major crime investigation unit. It became one of the largest police operations in the Constabulary's history. Jones urged the public to come forward with any information to help catch the killer, especially potential witnesses who were in the vicinity of Longwood Lane in Failand in the period before Yeates's body was discovered. He stated that the investigation was seeking the driver of a "light-coloured 4x4 vehicle" for questioning.

Jones said that officers had been "inundated with thousands of calls" and were "exhausting every lead and avenue that [they were] provided with." Police examined over 100 hours of surveillance footage along with 293 tonnes (293,000 kg) of rubbish seized from the area around Yeates's flat. Crime Stoppers offered a £10,000 reward for information leading to the arrest and conviction of her murderer, while The Sun newspaper offered £50,000. Authorities advised people living in the area to secure their homes, and warned women not to walk alone after dark. Speaking on 29 December about the murder investigation Yeates's father said, "I fear that whoever has done this will never hand themselves in, but we live in hope that the police will catch who is responsible."

=== Post mortem and initial enquiries ===
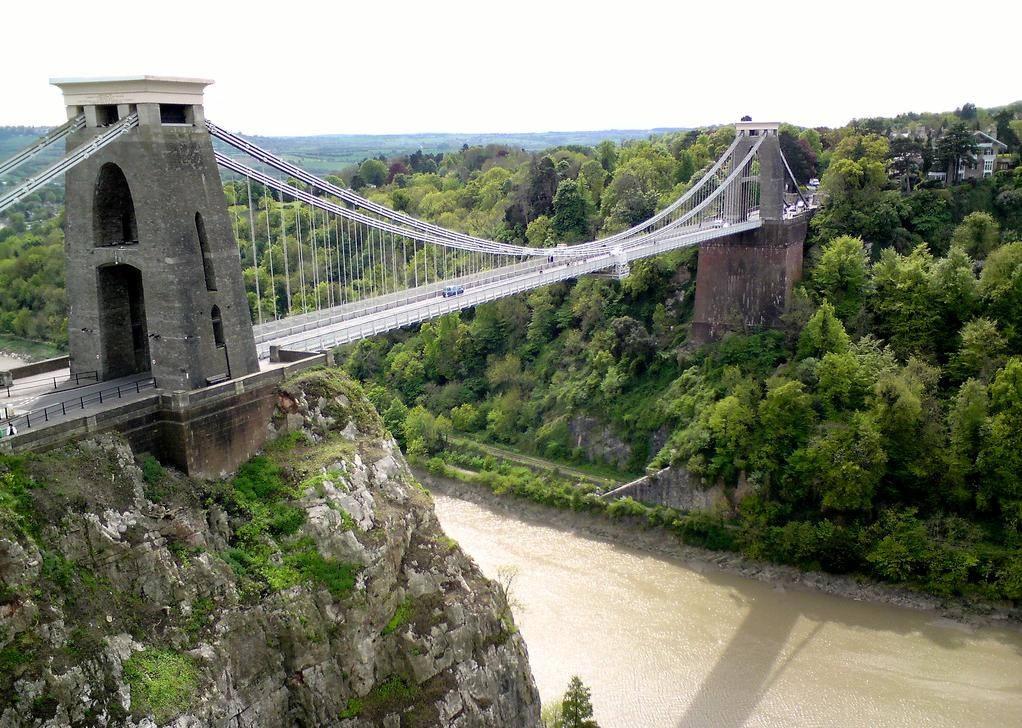
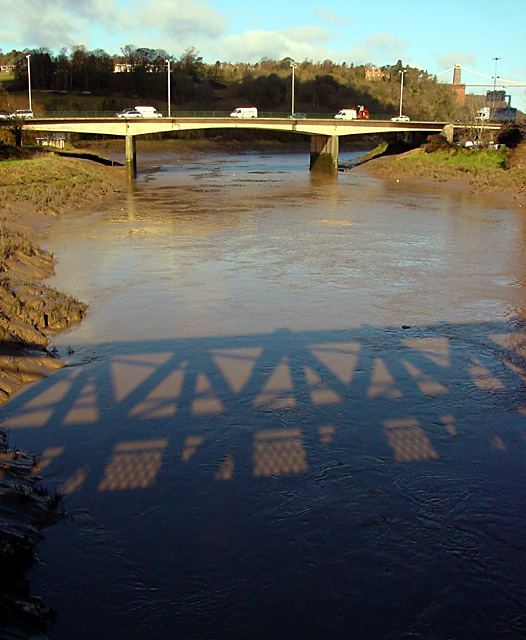
Police examined surveillance video from Clifton Suspension Bridge (left), but were aware that Avon Bridge (right) could have been used to avoid CCTV coverage.

Following the discovery of Yeates's body, detectives from the Avon and Somerset Constabulary issued an appeal for anyone with information about the death to come forward, and investigated similarities with other unsolved cases. Of particular interest to them were those of 20-year-old Glenis Carruthers who was strangled in 1974, Melanie Hall, aged 25, who disappeared in 1996 and whose body was discovered thirteen years later, and 35-year-old Claudia Lawrence who went missing in 2009.

Investigators identified "striking similarities" between the Yeates and Hall cases, notably their age and appearance, and that they had disappeared after returning home from meeting friends, but the possibility of such connections was later played down by authorities. The police gathered surveillance video from Clifton Suspension Bridge, which forms part of the most direct route from the crime scene to the Clifton suburb where Yeates was last seen alive. The footage was of poor quality, making it impossible to clearly distinguish individuals or car registration numbers. Investigators were aware that the perpetrator could have used an alternative bridge across the River Avon less than a mile to the south to avoid CCTV coverage.

A post mortem examination began on 26 December 2010, though results were delayed due to the frozen condition of the body. Police initially thought it possible that Yeates froze to death because her body showed no visible signs of injury. Investigators announced on 28 December that the case had become a murder inquiry as the pathologist who performed her autopsy determined that Yeates had died as a result of strangulation. The post mortem indicated that she had died "... several days before being discovered". The examination also confirmed that Yeates did not eat the pizza she had purchased. Detective Chief Inspector Jones stated that the investigation found "... no evidence to suggest that Joanna was sexually assaulted". The police searched Reardon's laptop computer and mobile phone as part of standard procedure. Reardon was ruled out as a suspect and treated as a witness.

A young woman attending a party at a neighbouring house on Canynge Road on the night of Yeates's disappearance recalled hearing two loud screams shortly after 9:00 pm coming from the direction of Yeates's flat. Another neighbour who lived behind Yeates's home said that he heard a woman's voice scream "Help me", although he could not recall exactly when the incident had occurred. Officers removed the front door to Yeates's flat to check for clothing fibres and DNA evidence, with investigators examining the possibility that the perpetrator had entered the flat before Yeates returned home.

=== Further enquiries ===
Senior officers from the investigation asked for assistance from the National Policing Improvement Agency, which provides expertise for difficult cases. On 4 January 2011, a clinical forensic psychologist, who had previously been involved as a criminal profiler in other high-profile murder cases, joined the investigation to help narrow down the number of potential suspects. Jones stated that his officers had established over 1,000 lines of inquiry. Jones said, "I can assure you, we are determined to solve this crime and bring Jo's killers to justice." On 5 January, Detective Chief Inspector Jones announced that one of Yeates's socks was missing when she was found dead and that it had not been found at the crime scene nor in her home.

Police launched a national advertising campaign to appeal for witnesses through Facebook. The page, established on 4 January, had been viewed nearly 250,000 times by the following day, while CCTV footage of Yeates had been viewed 120,000 times on YouTube by 5 January.

On 9 January 2011, Bristol East MP Kerry McCarthy gave her support to the idea of a public DNA screening process if the police found it useful. The Avon and Somerset Constabulary had conducted mass DNA screening during the 1995 investigation into the disappearance of Louise Smith. McCarthy suggested that the screening process should be extended beyond Clifton to the wider Bristol area. DNA that had been found on Yeates's body was tested for a potential profile. Detectives also began tracking the movements of several hundred registered sex offenders living within their jurisdiction to determine the individuals' whereabouts on 17 December.

=== Arrests and reconstruction of crime ===
Shortly after 7:00 am on 30 December 2010, Christopher Jefferies, Yeates's landlord who lived in another flat in the same building, was arrested on suspicion of her murder. He was taken to a local police station for questioning while forensic investigators inspected his flat. On 31 December, a senior police officer granted investigators a 12-hour extension to the arrest, enabling them to hold him in custody for additional questioning. Police subsequently applied to magistrates for further extensions which were granted on 31 December and 1 January. Investigators were able to detain him as a suspect for up to 96 hours, but released Jefferies on bail after two days. He retained the legal services of the law firm Stokoe Partnership to act on his behalf. On 4 March 2011, police released him from bail and stated he was no longer a suspect. He subsequently won an undisclosed sum in libel damages for defamatory news articles published following his arrest, and received an apology from Avon and Somerset Police for any distress caused to him during the investigation.

In January 2011, a reconstruction of the case was filmed on location in Bristol for broadcast in the 26 January edition of the BBC television programme Crimewatch. A specialised firm from the film industry was contracted to reproduce the snowy conditions at the time of Yeates's disappearance. The reconstruction of Yeates's last movements was filmed on 18 January, and within 24 hours of news coverage about the production, over 300 people contacted the police. A breakthrough led investigators to believe that Yeates's body might have been transported in a large holdall or suitcase.

On the morning of 20 January, the Avon and Somerset Constabulary arrested 32-year-old architectural engineer Vincent Tabak, who lived with his girlfriend in the flat next door to Yeates. However, authorities declined to reveal additional details while the suspect was being interrogated due to concerns over controversial media coverage of Jefferies's arrest, which had breached the rules governing what can be reported when an individual is arrested. The Tabak arrest followed an anonymous tip from a female caller, shortly after a televised appeal by Yeates's parents on Crimewatch. Canynge Road was closed by police while scaffolding was constructed around Yeates's home; and officers sealed off Tabak's adjacent flat. Investigators also searched the nearby townhouse of a friend, where Tabak was believed to have been staying, about a mile away. Tabak had previously been ruled out as a suspect during an earlier stage of the investigation, and had returned to Britain from a holiday visit to his family in the Netherlands.

Following Tabak's arrest, the BBC cancelled its plans to air the Yeates re-enactment on Crimewatch. On 31 January, previously unseen photos of Yeates were released through the programme's website.

=== DNA tests ===
DNA tests were carried out by LGC Forensics, a private company which undertakes forensic analysis for criminal investigations. Lindsey Lennen, a body fluids and DNA specialist member of the team that analysed DNA samples from Yeates's body, said that although DNA swabs matched Tabak, they were not of sufficient quality to be evaluated. The team deployed a method known as DNA SenCE, which enhances unusable DNA samples through purification and concentration: "We couldn't say whether the DNA was from saliva, or semen, or even touch. But we could say that the probability of it not being a match with Tabak was less than one in a billion."

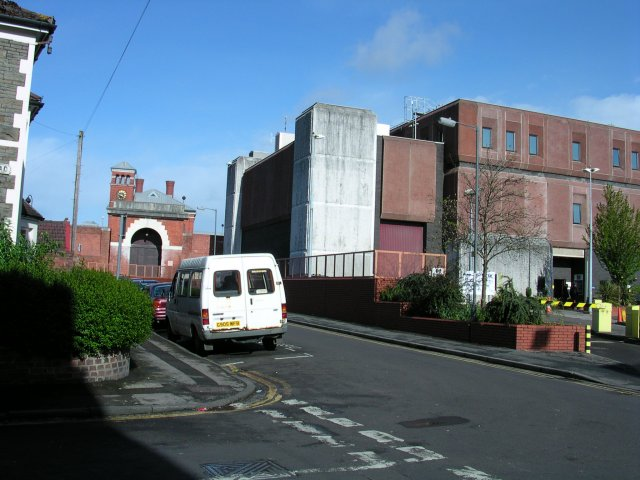
Bristol Prison: Vincent Tabak was moved from this prison for his safety.

=== Murder charge and plea ===
After questioning during 96 hours of detention, Tabak was charged on 22 January 2011 with the murder of Joanna Yeates. He made a brief appearance at Bristol's magistrates' court on 24 January and was remanded in custody. Tabak, legally represented by Paul Cook, declined to request bail during a hearing the following day. Tabak was moved from Bristol Prison because of fears for his safety, and was placed under suicide watch at Long Lartin Prison near Evesham. Tabak's family and friends in the Netherlands started to raise funds for his court defence.

Tabak initially maintained he was not responsible for Yeates's death, claiming that DNA evidence linking him to the crime had been fabricated by corrupt officials. However, on 8 February, he told Peter Brotherton, a prison chaplain, that he had killed her and intended to plead guilty.

On 5 May 2011, Tabak pleaded guilty to the manslaughter of Yeates, but denied murdering her. His plea of guilty to manslaughter was rejected by the Crown Prosecution Service. On 20 September, Tabak appeared in person at a pre-trial hearing at Bristol Crown Court. Appearances at previous hearings had been made via videolink from prison.

=== Vincent Tabak ===
Vincent Tabak
- Born: 10 February 1978 (age 48); Netherlands
- Status: Incarcerated
- Criminal charges: Murder; Possession of indecent images of children
- Penalty: Life imprisonment with a minimum term of 20 years for murder 10 months for indecent images

Details
- Date apprehended: 20 January 2011

Vincent Tabak (born 10 February 1978) is a Dutch engineer who had lived and worked in the United Kingdom since 2007. The youngest of five siblings, he was raised in Uden, 21 miles (34 km) north of Eindhoven. Tabak's childhood next-door neighbour, John Massoeurs, described him after the trial as an intelligent "introverted" loner. Tabak studied at Eindhoven University of Technology beginning in 1996, graduating with an MSc in architecture, building and planning in 2003, then began a PhD in which his thesis was a study of how people use space in office buildings and public areas. His PhD thesis was published in 2008.

Leaving university in 2007, he moved to the United Kingdom after taking a job at the headquarters of Buro Happold, an engineering consultancy firm in Bath, and settled in a flat in the town. He worked as a "people flow analyst", a role which required him to examine how people move around public spaces such as schools, airports and sports stadia. While living in Bath he established a relationship with a woman he first met through The Guardian's online dating website Soulmates. She was later described by the newspaper as his first serious girlfriend; he paid tribute to her in the acknowledgements of his thesis: "I am very happy she entered my life." The couple moved to a flat in Canynge Road, Bristol, in June 2009. Although Joanna Yeates and her partner moved into the neighbouring flat in Canynge Road in late 2010, she and Tabak did not meet prior to 17 December.

After killing Yeates, Tabak attempted to cast suspicion for the murder onto Jefferies after watching a news broadcast about the case while spending the New Year with relatives in the Netherlands. He contacted Avon and Somerset Police to tell them that Jefferies had been using his car on the night of 17 December, and a CID officer, DC Karen Thomas, was sent to Amsterdam to talk to him. They met at Amsterdam Schiphol Airport on 31 December, where Tabak elaborated on his story, but Thomas grew suspicious of his interest in the forensic work being carried out by the police and because what he said did not concur with a previous statement.

In the months leading up to Yeates's death, Tabak had used his computer to research escort agencies during business trips in the United Kingdom and United States, and contacted several sex workers by phone. He also viewed violent internet pornography that depicted women being controlled by men, showing images of them being bound and gagged, held by the neck and choked. During the murder investigation, police found images of a woman who bore a striking resemblance to Yeates. In one scene she was shown pulling up a pink top to expose her bra and breasts. When Yeates was discovered, she was wearing a similarly arranged pink top.

At Tabak's trial, prosecuting barrister Nigel Lickley QC, argued that the evidence of Tabak's activities should be provided to the jury: "It might shed light on the need to hold a woman for long enough and the need to squeeze hard enough to take her life." Details of Tabak's viewing of pornography were not included in the prosecution's case since the judge believed it did not prove that Tabak had acted with premeditation.

After the trial it emerged that pornographic images of children had been found on Tabak's laptop. In December 2013, the Crown Prosecution Service announced that he would be prosecuted for possessing the images. On 2 March 2015, Tabak pleaded guilty to possessing more than 100 indecent images of children, and was sentenced to 10 months in prison, to run concurrently with his existing life sentence for murder.

=== Trial ===
The trial of Vincent Tabak started on 4 October 2011 at the Crown Court at Bristol before Mr Justice Field and a jury. His counsel in the trial was William Clegg QC and the prosecutor was Nigel Lickley QC. Tabak pleaded guilty to manslaughter, but denied murder.

The prosecution case was that Tabak had strangled Yeates at her flat within minutes of her arrival home on 17 December 2010, using "sufficient force" to kill her. The prosecutors stated that Tabak – around a foot (30 cm) taller than Yeates – had used his height and build to overpower her, pinning her to the floor by the wrists, and that she had suffered 43 separate injuries to her head, neck, torso and arms during the struggle. The injuries included cuts, bruises, and a fractured nose. Lickley told the court that the struggle was lengthy, and her death would have been slow and painful. However, he did not offer an explanation for the reasoning behind Tabak's initial attack on Yeates.

Evidence was presented that Tabak had then tried to conceal the crime by disposing of her body. The court heard that DNA swabs taken from Yeates's body had provided a match with Tabak. Samples found behind the knees of her jeans indicated she may have been held by the legs as she was carried, while fibres suggested contact with Tabak's coat and car. Blood stains were found on a wall overlooking a quarry close to where Yeates was discovered. The prosecution also said that Tabak attempted to implicate Jefferies for the murder during the police investigation, and that in the days following Yeates's death, he had made internet searches for topics that included the length of time a body takes to decompose and the dates of refuse collections in the Clifton area.

In his defence, Tabak claimed that the killing had not been sexually motivated, and told the court that he had killed Yeates while trying to silence her after she screamed when he tried to kiss her. He claimed that Yeates had made a "flirty comment" and invited him to drink with her. He said that after she screamed he held his hands over her mouth and around her neck to silence her. He denied suggestions of a struggle, claiming to have held Yeates by the neck with only minimal force, and "... for about 20 seconds". He told the court that after dumping the body he was "... in a state of panic".

The jury was sent out to deliberate on 26 October, and returned with a verdict two days later. On 28 October 2011, Tabak was found guilty of Joanna Yeates's murder by a 10 to 2 majority verdict. He was jailed for life, with a minimum term of 20 years. Passing sentence, Mr Justice Field referred to a "sexual element" to the killing.

== Media controversy ==
The manner in which certain aspects of the case were reported by the British media led to television broadcaster ITN being temporarily banned from attending press conferences related to the case, and the instigation of legal proceedings against several newspapers by both Yeates's former landlord, and the Attorney General.

Following a television news report on 4 January 2011 that criticised the handling of the investigation, ITN reporters were banned by the Avon and Somerset Constabulary from attending a press conference convened to give updates on the murder case. The item, presented by journalist Geraint Vincent, claimed police had made little progress with their investigation, and questioned whether they were following correct procedural methods. A former murder squad detective told the report that "certain routine inquiries" such as looking for fresh evidence at the crime scene were not being carried out. ITN accused the police of attempting "to censor what information we can broadcast" while the constabulary filed a complaint with the Office of Communications, calling the broadcast "unfair, naïve and irresponsible reporting". The police subsequently lifted the sanctions against ITN, but said that they would "not hesitate to adopt similar tactics in the future." Legal action was also considered over a tweet revealing that Tabak had viewed internet pornography showing erotic asphyxiation and bondage. The contempt of court charges were dropped after the tweet was removed.

Writing in London's Evening Standard on 5 January 2011, media commentator Roy Greenslade expressed concern over a number of negative articles that had appeared in newspapers concerning Yeates's landlord, Jefferies, following his arrest, describing the coverage as "character assassination on a large scale". He cited several examples of headlines and stories that had been published, including a headline in The Sun describing Jefferies – a former schoolmaster at Clifton College – as weird, posh, lewd and creepy; a story from the Daily Express quoting unnamed former pupils referring to him as "... a sort of Nutty Professor" who made them feel "creeped out" by his "strange" behaviour; and an article from The Daily Telegraph, which reported Jefferies "has been described by pupils at Clifton College ... as a fan of dark and violent avant-garde films". Jefferies launched legal action against six newspapers on 21 April – The Sun, the Daily Mirror, the Daily Star, the Daily Express, the Daily Mail and the Daily Record – seeking damages for libel. It was held that the media were quick to jump to conclusions regarding Jefferies's arrest. Being a retired English teacher who lived alone, whose physical appearance and "eccentrically unkempt white hair," made him stand out, led people to believe that he looked the type. Stephen Moss wrote in The Guardian: "The unspoken assumption was that no one could look that odd and be innocent."

He was represented by Louis Charalambous of the law firm Simons Muirhead and Burton, who in 2008 had successfully acted for Robert Murat after he became a suspect during the investigation into the disappearance of Madeleine McCann and had faced similar media scrutiny. On 29 July Jefferies accepted "substantial" damages for defamation from The Sun, the Daily Mirror, the Sunday Mirror, the Daily Record, the Daily Mail, the Daily Express, the Daily Star and The Scotsman in connection with their coverage of his arrest. In an interview following Tabak's conviction, Jefferies commented: "It has taken up a whole year virtually of my life, that period of time has meant that everything else that I would normally be doing has been in abeyance." He criticised the government's plans to change the law on legal aid, which he said would prevent people with limited means from taking action against newspapers.

Dominic Grieve, the Attorney General for England and Wales, stated on 31 December 2010 that he was considering action under the Contempt of Court Act 1981 to enforce the obligation of the media not to prejudice a possible future trial. Criminology professor David Wilson commented on the resonance of the murder case with the national news media: "The British public loves a whodunnit ... It's a particularly British thing. We were the first nation to use murder stories to sell newspapers and that culture is more ingrained here than elsewhere." Wilson called Yeates, a white female professional, an "ideal victim" for the media. On 1 January, Yeates's boyfriend Greg Reardon commented on the media coverage surrounding Jefferies' arrest: "Jo's life was cut short tragically but the finger-pointing and character assassination by social and news media of as yet innocent men has been shameful."

On 12 May 2011, the Administrative Court granted the Attorney General permission to move a motion for committal for contempt of court against The Sun and the Daily Mirror for the way they had reported the arrest of Jefferies. On 29 July, the court (Lord Judge CJ, Thomas LJ and Owen J) ruled that both newspapers had been in contempt of court, and fined the Daily Mirror £50,000 and The Sun £18,000. The Lord Chief Justice of England and Wales, Lord Judge, stated that "in our judgment, as a matter of principle, the vilification of a suspect under arrest is a potential impediment to the course of justice." The publishers of The Sun and the Daily Mirror subsequently appealed their fines, but the Mirror case was rejected by the Supreme Court on 9 March 2012, whilst The Sun withdrew its appeal.

=== Ramifications ===
The Yeates case was mentioned during a Parliamentary debate on a private member's bill that would have imposed a sentence of six months' imprisonment on any journalist who names an uncharged suspect. The proposed legislation was introduced into the House of Commons in June 2010, by Anna Soubry, the Conservative MP for Broxtowe, a former journalist and criminal law barrister. In a debate on 4 February 2011 Soubry told the House: "What we saw in Bristol was, in effect, a feeding frenzy and vilification. Much of the coverage was not only completely irrelevant, but there was a homophobic tone to it which I found deeply offensive. The slurs on the man were out of order." She withdrew the proposal after encountering opposition from the Conservative-led coalition government.

Jefferies gave evidence to the Leveson Inquiry, established by Prime Minister David Cameron to investigate the ethics and behaviour of the British media following the News of the World phone hacking affair. Jefferies told the inquiry that reporters had "besieged" him after he was questioned by the police; he said: "It was clear that the tabloid press had decided that I was guilty of Miss Yeates's murder and seemed determined to persuade the public of my guilt. They embarked on a frenzied campaign to blacken my character by publishing a series of very serious allegations about me which were completely untrue." Appearing before the same inquiry on 16 January 2012, the Daily Mirror editor, Richard Wallace, described the newspaper's coverage of Jefferies's arrest as a "black mark" on his editing record.

== Aftermath and memorials ==
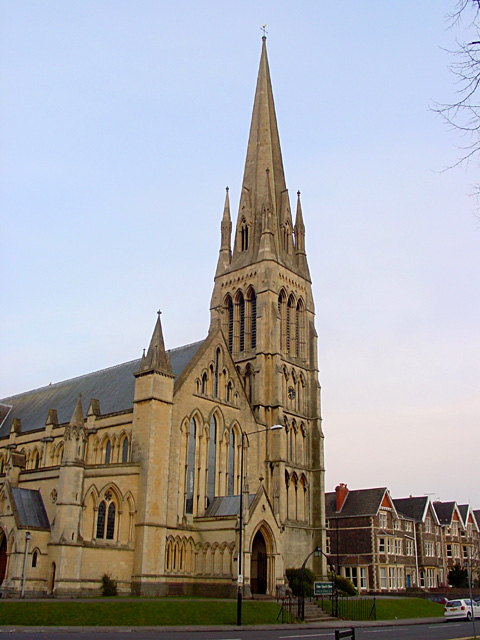
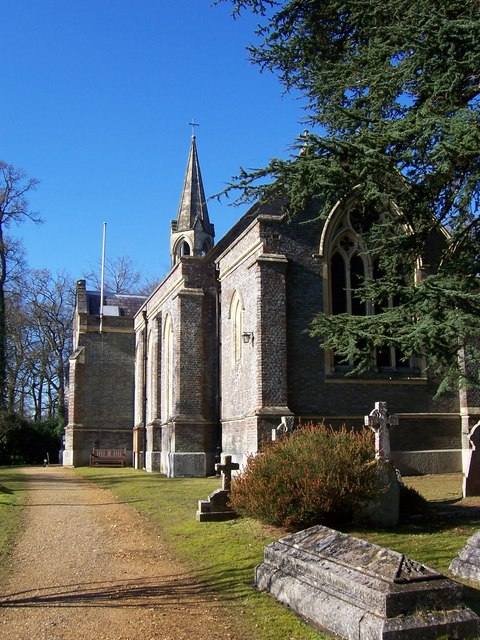
A memorial service for Yeates was held at Christ Church in Clifton (left) and she was buried in the yard of St Mark's Church near Ampfield (right).

Associate vicar Dan Clark led a memorial service for Yeates at Christ Church in Clifton on 2 January 2011. Prayers for her were also said at the church on 17 December 2011, the first anniversary of her death, while visitors left tributes and messages of condolence for her family. Greg Reardon started a charity website in Yeates's memory to raise funds on behalf of families of missing people. Yeates's friends and family planted a memorial garden at the Sir Harold Hillier Gardens in Romsey where she had worked as a student. Building Design Partnership and the local NHS trust announced plans to commemorate her with a memorial in a garden she had been designing for a new £430 million hospital in Southmead, Bristol.

Other plans for memorials included a garden of remembrance at the BDP firm's studio in Bristol, a published anthology of Yeates's work and an annual landscape design prize named after her for students of the University of Gloucestershire. BDP announced it would dedicate a charity cycle ride between its offices on its 50th anniversary, with proceeds to go to charities selected by her family. Yeates left behind an estate valued at £47,000, which included money set aside to purchase a home with Reardon. As she had not written a will, the sum was inherited by her parents.

Following the release of her body on 31 January 2011, Yeates's family arranged to hold her funeral at St Mark's of Ampfield, Hampshire, and have her interred in the churchyard. Yeates was buried on 11 February; approximately 300 people attended the service, which was led by vicar Peter Gilks.

In 2013, ITV commissioned a drama about Jefferies's arrest. Filming of the two-part series, starring Jason Watkins in the leading role, began in November. The Bristol Post reported that Jefferies had read and approved the script, and supported the project. The drama, titled The Lost Honour of Christopher Jefferies, aired on 10 and 11 December 2014. In May 2015, it won two awards at the 2015 British Academy Television Awards—best mini-series for the programme itself and best actor for Watkins's portrayal of Jefferies. The series has not been released on any form of home media to date. On 26 March 2015, the case was the subject of an episode of the Channel 5 documentary series Countdown to Murder, titled "The Killer Next Door: The Last Hours of Joanna Yeates".

Jefferies has since given his account of what happened, and described to the press in 2014 the mental strain the investigation had on his life for over two months. Jefferies said: "At the time it felt as if the police were deliberately playing a game – promising the ordeal would soon be over and then finding it necessary to prolong the wait. It was a form of psychological torture. At such times the mind plays tricks, and one starts to believe that perhaps one is a criminal without knowing it and that, as in some Kafkaesque nightmare, guilt has been pre-ordained and the sentence is inescapable."

== See also ==
- Lists of solved missing person cases
