= Whittow =

Whittow is an English surname and may refer to

- Hugh Whittow (born 1951), British journalist
- Mark Whittow (1957–2017), British historian and archaeologist
- Wayne F. Whittow (1933–2025), American politician in Wisconsin
