= Alison Phillips =

British newspaper executive

Downing Street Deputy Chief of Staff
- Incumbent
- Assumed office 20 July 2026
- Prime Minister: Andy Burnham
- Chief of Staff: James Purnell
- Preceded by: Vidhya Alakeson; Jill Cuthbertson

Downing Street Transition Director
- Incumbent
- Assumed office 20 July 2026
- Prime Minister: Andy Burnham
- Preceded by: Office established

Senior Adviser to the Prime Minister for Transition and Organisational Development
- Incumbent
- Assumed office 20 July 2026
- Prime Minister: Andy Burnham
- Preceded by: Office established

Personal details
- Born: 1970 (age 55–56) Essex, England
- Party: Labour
- Education: University of Leeds
- Occupation: Lobbyist, journalist

Alison Phillips (born 1970) is an English lobbyist and former journalist who was the editor of the Daily Mirror between 2018 and 2024. She was recently the chief executive of the Blairite pressure group Labour Together. She is currently serving as Downing Street Deputy Chief of Staff, Downing Street Transition Director and Senior Adviser to the Prime Minister for Transition and Organisational Development.

== Biography ==
Phillips grew up in Essex and attended the University of Leeds. She first worked as a reporter for the Harlow Star Weekly Newspaper. She has worked for the Brighton Argus, Connors News Agency and Woman. She was the deputy features editor in 1998 on the Sunday People magazine.

In 2016, Phillips launched The New Day, a national newspaper which aimed to deliver politically neutral news, primarily for a female audience. Its launch was sceptically received by media commentators. The new venture failed to reach target circulation and was closed two months after its launch. Later that year she was made Deputy Editor-in-Chief of the Trinity Mirror papers.

=== Daily Mirror ===
In 2018, Phillips was named as the Editor of the Daily Mirror, making her its first female editor since its very first editor in 1903, Mary Howarth. She often writes and speaks about gender equality and the gender pay gap, including at her own company.

She is a regular media commentator, often appearing on programmes such as the BBC's Politics Live and ITV's This Morning. In June 2018, she was a guest on BBC One's Question Time, declaring that the Brexit negotiations had made Britain "a global laughing stock".

In 2018 she was named a "Columnist of the Year" at the National Press Awards, for her weekly Wednesday column in the Daily Mirror. The column often covers working-class family issues from a broadly left-wing perspective. Under her editorship, the Daily Mirror's stance on Brexit was critical of the Conservative government, but remained opposed to calls for a second referendum. Phillips succeeded Eleanor Mills as chair of the Women in Journalism pressure group in February 2021.

Phillips stepped down as editor-in-chief of the Daily Mirror at the end of January 2024.

=== Hope Not Hate ===
On 24 March 2025, Philips was appointed as director at Hope not Hate Ltd, the political campaigning arm of left wing activist group Hope not Hate.

=== Labour Together ===
In September 2025, Phillips became CEO of Labour Together, a think tank supporting the Labour government and Prime Minister's office. In July 2026, Phillips left her role as CEO of Labour Together and assumed office as Downing Street Transition Director, she was replaced by Labour Together's Executive Director of Political Strategy, Ed Owen, who will serve as Interim CEO until a permanent one can be chosen in 6 months.

=== Downing Street Transition Director ===
On 20 July 2026, Phillips departed to become Downing Street's first ever Transition Director. Initially, Phillips was assigned to lead Andy Burnham's transition team during his leadership campaign but after Burnham became Prime Minister on July 20, 2026, she was appointed to lead the transition from Keir Starmer's government to Andy Burnham's government and help oversee the reorganisation of Downing Street and the formation of Number 10 North.

Media offices
| Preceded by Tina Weaver | Editor of the Sunday Mirror; 2012–2016 | Succeeded by Gary Jones |
| Preceded by James Scott | Editor of the Sunday People; 2014–2016 | Succeeded by Gary Jones |
| Preceded by New position | Editor of The New Day; 2016 | Succeeded by Newspaper closed |
| Preceded by Peter Willis | Editor of the Daily Mirror; 2018–2024 | Succeeded by Caroline Waterston |
