= Gareth Morgan (editor) =

British newspaper editor

Gareth Morgan is a former editor of UK tabloid newspaper the Daily Star Sunday.

He became editor of the newspaper in December 2003, taking over from Hugh Whittow. Within four years he made the Daily Star Sunday Britain's fastest growing national newspaper. Once he said in an interview that this is the nicest job a man could wish for.

Media offices
Preceded by Hugh Whittow	Editor of Daily Star Sunday; 2003–2013	Succeeded by Peter Carbery
