= Gemma Aldridge =

British newspaper editor

Gemma Louise Aldridge (born 8 August 1984) is a British media strategist and former newspaper editor.

== Biography ==
Aldridge attended Selwyn College, Cambridge, where she read the modern and medieval languages tripos, and studied for a postgraduate diploma in journalism at City University, London. She worked for the Daily Mirror for many years, rising to become a features editor and assistant editor of the weekend editions, before being appointed as deputy editor in 2020. In 2021, she was appointed as editor of the Sunday Mirror and of the Sunday People, making her the youngest woman to have edited a British national newspaper at that time. She is known for the papers' campaign to encourage COVID-19 vaccine uptake during the pandemic and their coverage of major news events including the death and funeral of Queen Elizabeth II and the 2024 General Election in which they were vocal in backing Labour. While in the posts, Aldridge argued publicly that newspapers should recruit more young people from diverse socioeconomic backgrounds. She announced she would be leaving the Mirror group in November 2024 before departing in early 2025.

In 2025, it was reported that Aldridge had been commissioned by direct appointment of the Secretary of State for Health and Social care to lead an independent review of government health communications, media strategy and digital content in the Department of Health. She has since worked in an independent advisory capacity at the DHSC and NHS England.

Aldridge is also co-author of British Olympic athlete Kelly Holmes's memoir, Unique (2023).

Media offices
Preceded by Paul Henderson	Editor of the Sunday Mirror and Sunday People; 2021–2024	Succeeded by Caroline Waterston
