= Alford Gardner =

Jamaican war veteran and migrant to the UK (1926–2024)

Alford Dalrymple Gardner (27 January 1926 – 1 October 2024) was a Jamaican-born "Windrush generation" emigrant and co-founder of the first Caribbean cricket club in Britain.

== Biography ==
Alford Gardner was born in Kingston, Jamaica, on 12 January 1926. He first came to the United Kingdom during World War II, returning to Jamaica after the war ended. After experiencing the lack of employment opportunities in his home country, Gardner secured a ticket for the HMT Empire Windrush, which brought him back to England. He established himself in Leeds, becoming an important figurehead in the community and raising the profile of the city.

Gardner died from bowel cancer in Leeds, on 1 October 2024, at the age of 98.

== Royal Air Force career ==
At the age of 17, Gardner volunteered to help the British war effort. He joined the Royal Air Force (RAF) and arrived in the United Kingdom on 3 June 1944. He was an engineer and mechanic during World War II, based at RAF Hunmanby Moor, near Filey.

== Impact in Leeds ==
Gardner returned to England with his brother in 1948 on the HMT Empire Windrush, the ship that is primarily remembered today for bringing one of the first large groups of post-war West Indian immigrants to the United Kingdom. In the aftermath of World War II, people were encouraged to come to Britain to bolster the workforce. The UK faced a shortage of labour and needed 1.3 million additional workers to rebuild infrastructure.

In the munitions factory near Leeds that made tanks, Gardner was repeatedly turned down for work in the late 1940s because he was not allowed to join the company's union. A labour officer at Barnbow eventually revealed there was a colour bar, which meant Jamaica-born Gardner could not be employed.

Gardner set up Britain's first Caribbean cricket club with fellow Jamaican RAF veterans Errol James, Hubert "Glen" English and Charles Dawkins. Leeds Caribbean Cricket Club was an important focal point for the West Indian community, particularly in the 1950s and '60s. Gardner wanted the club to help break down racial barriers. It is the longest running black-led organisation in the city and the oldest of its type in the UK. In 2024, a new clubhouse was opened, costing more than £500,000 and financed by Sport England, the England and Wales Cricket Board and the club.

Gardner delivered numerous talks for children, students, community groups, national bodies and events. He was a historical adviser for the Phoenix Dance production Windrush: Movement of the People. Gardner had a critical role in providing archival content, including pictures and objects, as well as advising, providing personal recollections and identifying people and places for the Eulogy Exhibition, the most visited exhibition in the Leeds Libraries' history.

Gardner was interviewed by the BBC for the 2019 television documentary The Unwanted: The Secret Windrush Files.

== Awards and recognition ==
Gardner's story was central to the Jamaica Society Leeds exhibition For King, Country and Home, curated by Susan Pitter, which explored the lives of Leeds' Caribbean World War II veterans and was held at Leeds Central Library.

Gardner was a recipient of the 2023 Pride of Britain Outstanding Contribution Award. The Prince of Wales visited Alford at his home in Leeds for ITV's Pride Of Britain: A Windrush Special documentary.

He was a recipient of the Leeds Award in recognition of his special and lasting contribution to the city of Leeds. His name is permanently on display in Leeds Civic Hall alongside others who have made an enormous contribution to the city.

Gardner's portrait was one of ten commissioned by King Charles III to commemorate the 75th anniversary of the arrival of HMT Empire Windrush. Bristol artist Chloe Cox painted Alford and his portrait was on display at Royal West of England Academy (RWA), Bristol, from 25 May to 11 August 2024.

== Bibliography ==
- Gardner, Alford Dalrymple; Howard Gardner (2023). Finding Home. Jacaranda Books. ISBN 978-1914344220.
