= Ray Powles =

Professor Ray Powles CBE FRCP FRCPath
- Born: Raymond Leonard Powles; 9 March 1938 (age 88)
- Occupation: Physician

Raymond Leonard Powles (born 9 March 1938) is a British physician. His identical twin, Trevor Powles, is also a doctor.

In 1973 he performed the first successful bone marrow transplant in Europe. and pioneered in 1978 the use of cyclosporine in bone marrow transplantation, published simultaneously with Sir Roy Calne for kidney transplantation. In 1983 he, in conjunction with Prof Tim McElwain reported the first autologous stem cell transplant for multiple myeloma

He was Physician-in-Charge (from 1974) and Group Head for Haemato-Oncology (from 1993) at the Leukaemia and Myeloma Units of the Royal Marsden Hospital.

He was also, from 1977, Professor of Haemato-Oncology at the University of London, Institute of Cancer Research.

Ray and Trevor were each made Commanders of the Order of the British Empire (CBE) in 2002 for their services to medicine. Together, they received Lifetime Achievement awards in the 2013 Pride of Britain awards, presented to them by the then-prime minister, David Cameron.
