= Cecilia Anim =

Ghanaian nurse

Cecilia Anim CBE
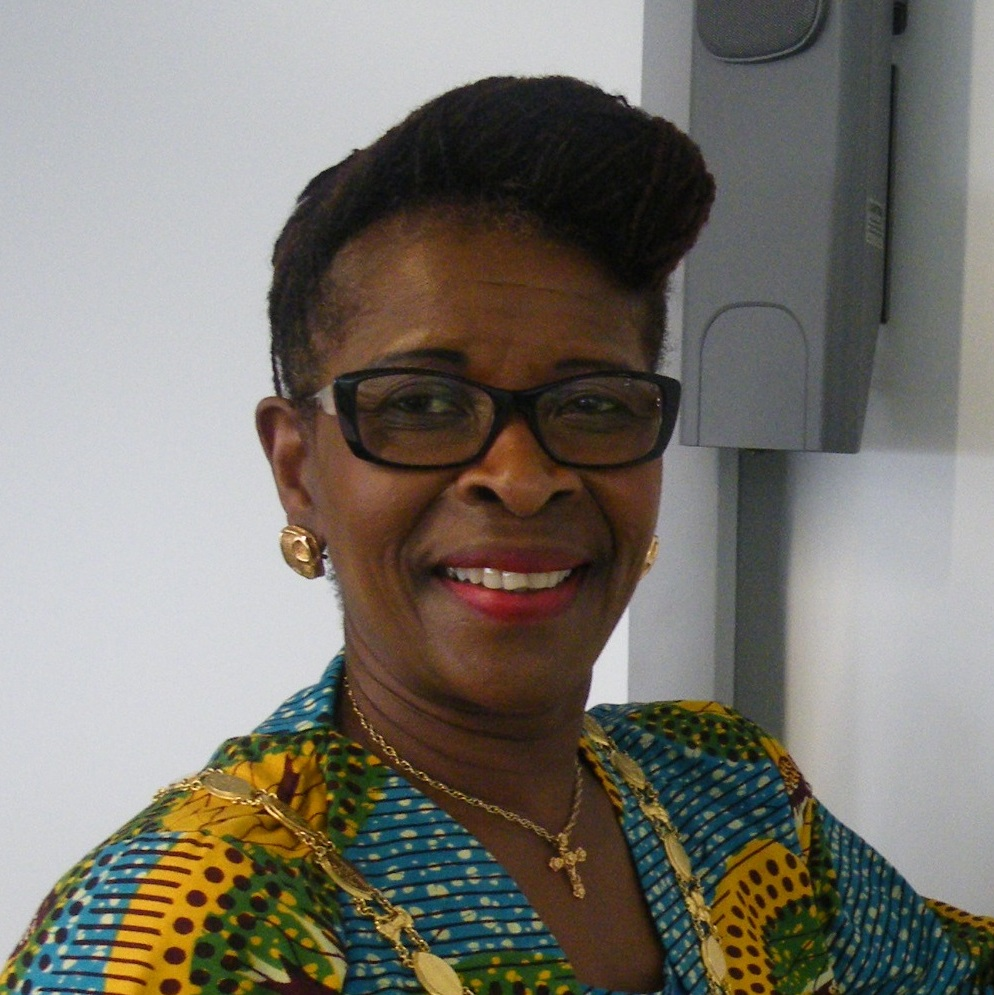

39th President of the Royal College of Nursing
- In office 2015–2018
- Preceded by: Andrea Spyropoulos
- Succeeded by: Professor Annemarie Rafferty

Personal details
- Occupation: clinical nurse specialist

Cecilia Akrisie Anim CBE former president of the Royal College of Nursing (RCN) (2015 – 2018), and a clinical nurse specialist in sexual and reproductive health at the Margaret Pyke Centre in London.

== Early life and education ==
Born in Ghana, Anim attended school there and completed her midwifery training at Komfo Anokye Hospital, Kumasi, Ghana in 1968. Anim moved to the UK in the 1970s and completed the UK general nursing course at Hull Royal Infirmary. She later completed her clinical nurse specialist training in advanced family planning at the Bloomsbury School of Nursing.

== Career ==
Anim started her nursing career in her native Ghana where she worked as a midwife from 1968-1972. In 1977, having completed her UK general nursing course at Hull Royal Infirmary she took up post there as a staff nurse in paediatrics. In 1979 she began working at London's Margaret Pyke Centre, where she continues to work as a clinical nurse specialist in sexual and reproductive health, alongside her RCN presidency.

A member of the RCN for over 30 years, Anim served as deputy president (2010 – 2014) before being elected president in 2015. She served her second term as RCN President having been re-elected in 2017. Anim was the first BME president of the RCN.

== Community ==
Anim is also active in her local community, being particularly involved with St Augustine's, Kilburn and the parish schools. She is Chair of Governors at St Augustine's CE Primary School.

== Awards ==
Anim was awarded the Bevan award for Health and Wellbeing in 2013. 2016 saw Anim receive an honorary Doctor of Health degree from the University of Bradford. In the Queen's 2017 New Year's Honours list Anim was appointed a CBE in recognition of her role as a nurse, RCN president and contribution to her community. Anim was awarded Fellowship of the Royal College of Nursing in 2021.
