= Hannen Swaffer =

British journalist (1879–1962)

Hannen Swaffer in 1930, photographed by Howard Coster

Frederick Charles Hannen Swaffer (1 November 1879 – 16 January 1962) was an English journalist and drama critic. Although his views were left-wing, he worked mostly for right-wing publications, many of them owned by Lord Northcliffe. He was a proponent of spiritualism, and an opponent of capital punishment.

== Life and career ==
Hannen Swaffer was born in Lindfield, Sussex, the eldest of eight children of a Folkestone draper, Henry Joseph Swaffer, and his wife, Kate Eugenie Hannen. He was educated first at St George's Church of England School in Ramsgate and then at Stroud Green Grammar School, Kent, and joined a local newspaper in Folkestone as an apprentice reporter. His first published article was a review of a performance by George Grossmith at the local town hall. Swaffer's reviews were so vituperative that he was banned from the local theatre, the first of many such bans during his career. While at Folkestone he read Robert Blatchford's book of socialist essays, Merrie England, and adopted its left-wing views for the rest of his life.

After further experience in provincial journalism, he joined the Daily Mail in 1902, and worked for its proprietor Alfred Harmsworth (later Lord Northcliffe) for the next seventeen years. Swaffer married Helen Hannah, daughter of John Sitton, a Clapham grocer, in 1904; they had no children. They remained married until her death in 1956, although he left her at intervals for various mistresses.

He was editor of Northcliffe's Weekly Dispatch and then helped develop the Daily Mirror, originally a paper for women, into a mass-market title. In 1913, he initiated "Mr Gossip" for the Daily Sketch. He also began "Mr London" for The Daily Graphic, and contributed the "Plays and Players" column to The Sunday Times. Swaffer was appointed editor of The People in 1924, but was unsuited to the duties of editing a paper, and held the post for only a few months. He became drama critic of the Daily Express and its sister Sunday Express in 1926. Later, he said that although he enjoyed the company of actors, he disliked having to watch them acting, and he accused Noël Coward and others of being "non-existent talents".

Swaffer became interested in spiritualism in the 1930s; it became one of the causes he promoted, along with socialism and the abolition of the death penalty. He claimed that his spiritualist circle had conjured up the ghost of his former employer, Northcliffe, as well as those of other dead celebrities.

The Manchester Guardian commented on Swaffer's "air of self-importance equal to that of Bernard Shaw himself … he raised professional egotism to a fine art." Described by The Times as "something of a poseur", he was conspicuous for his flamboyant clothes, and was, according to The British Journalism Review, "remembered for little more than the mixture of dandruff and cigarette ash on his velvet collar, and for defining freedom of the press as 'freedom to print such of the proprietor's prejudices as the advertisers don't object to'." He claimed to have renounced his early anti-Semitic views, but it has been said that he remained implacably racist and attempted to have black actors banned from the theatre. On the other hand, a study of the press and the holocaust highlighted his "solitary voice of protest" and outrage in the Daily Herald against mass pogroms of Jews in Poland.

For some years in the 1950s, he wrote a regular column in the then popular Sunday paper The People, headed by an image of his part-profile and trademark hat.

Swaffer died in London at the age of eighty-two, having outlived his wife by six years.

His books included Northcliffe's Return (1925), Really Behind the Scenes (1929), Hannen Swaffer's Who's Who (1929) and Inspiration (1929). After the British Press Awards were established in the year of his death, they were, for their first four years, named in his honour. A biography of Swaffer by Tom Driberg was published in 1974.

== Notes ==
Media offices
| Preceded by Montagu Cotton | Editor of the Weekly Dispatch; 1915–1919 | Succeeded by Bernard Falk |
| Preceded by Robert Donald | Editor of The People; 1924–1925 | Succeeded by Harry Ainsworth |
