= Songaminute Man =

British singer and charity fundraiser

Simon and Ted McDermott became famous together in 2016 when Simon McDermott supported his father Ted McDermott to produce songs under his artist's name Teddy Mac - The Songaminute Man in 2016.

Ted McDermott had been a professional singer in clubs and had been given the nickname "The Songaminute Man" by fans for his ability to sing any song perfectly on command.

Later, he began to lose his memory due to Alzheimer's disease. He was first diagnosed with Alzheimer's in 2013 at the age of 77 and later passed away at the age of 89 on 12th June 2026, and his son Simon decided to give up his marketing career in London to return to Blackburn to help his mother care for his father. He then realized, starting with songs such as "Quando Quando Quando", that he could reach out to his father by singing songs together with him, and that his father sang the songs in perfect tune. Simon subsequently uploaded videos in the style of carpool karaoke of his singing with his father on Facebook and YouTube, with a link to a JustGiving page, which quickly became popular on the Internet.

Their cooperation led to international media acclaim and raised awareness and funds for causes relating to Alzheimer's patients. By 2018, they had raised over $175,000 for the Alzheimer's Society.

Their work led to the publication of a first single "You Make Me Feel So Young" / "Quando Quando Quando" with Decca Records in 2016, and the publication of a crowd-funded album "Songaminute" in 2017.

Simon McDermott documented their path in the book The Songaminute Man, recounting his father's life as well as his experience of caring for his father.

Ted's second album "Swing on Jupiter and Mars" was released as a limited edition CD in December 2021 on The Songaminute Man website. The tracks were recorded during the 2020 and 2021 lockdowns in the COVID-19 pandemic.

A Japanese film, titled 父と僕の終わらない歌 / Our Eternal Song and inspired by the book The Songaminute Man, was released in Japan on 23 May 2025.

The book The Songaminute Man was republished as an updated paperback in May 2025 under the title: The Songs That Saved Us.

Ted McDermott died on 12 July 2026, aged 89.

== Awards ==
Simon and Ted McDermott received a Special Recognition award of the Pride of Britain Awards in 2016.

They were awarded JustGiving's 'Creative Fundraiser of the Year Award' in 2016.

In 2017, Simon and Ted won the 'Fundraiser of the Year' (Individual) Award at the Alzheimer's Society 'Dementia Friendly Awards' ceremony.

In 2018, Simon and Ted McDermot also won a Mano Amiga Award.

In 2023, they pair were recognised with a Points of Light Award by Prime Minister Rishi Sunak for raising funds and awareness for Alzheimer's charities.

== Book ==
- Simon McDermott, The Songaminute Man. How Music Brought My Father Home Again, ISBN 978-0-008-23266-5, HarperCollins Publishers, 2018.
