= Harry Ainsworth =

British newspaper editor

Harry Ainsworth (1 August 1888 – 4 August 1965) was a British newspaper editor.

Born in Darwen, Ainsworth worked on local newspapers before becoming the news editor of the Weekly Dispatch. He next became Assistant Editor at Odhams Press, then Editor of John Bull. In 1925, Ainsworth became editor of The People on its takeover by Odhams. At the time it had a circulation of 250,000 copies per issue but, within five years, he had increased this to 2,500,000, and ultimately raised it to five million.

Ainsworth remained Editor of The People until 1957 although, for his last ten years, Stuart Campbell was effectively in control. Ainsworth was also one of the founding members of the Press Council.

Media offices
Preceded by Hannen Swaffer	Editor of The People; 1925–1957	Succeeded by Stuart Campbell
