= Silla Carron =

British community activist

Silla Carron, 62, is a British community activist from Camden Town, London, UK.

== Biography ==
Carron has led residents' participation in improving their living environment and reducing crime and anti-social behaviour (ASB). She led campaigns in Camden, Plymouth, and Bristol, aimed at turning around sink estates with high levels of crime, vandalism and drug-taking. She has appeared in two series of the BBC One programme The Estate We're In.

Carron received an award in recognition of her community action work, including the 'Neighbour of the Year Award' in the 2006 Pride of Britain Awards.
