= Stuart Campbell (journalist) =

British newspaper editor (1908–1966)

Renton Stuart Campbell (4 June 1908 – 1 February 1966) was a British newspaper editor known for "investigation and exposure of criminal and social wrongdoing."

Born in Kensal Rise, Campbell studied at Lavender Hill School and Wandsworth Technical Institute Secondary School before working as a reporter for, successively, the Hendon and Finchley Times, the Woking Gazette, the Nottingham Guardian, the News Chronicle and the Daily Mirror. In 1937, he became assistant editor of the Sunday Pictorial and, while its editor Hugh Cudlipp served in the forces during World War II, Campbell became its editor.

As editor of the Pictorial, Campbell focussed on support for ordinary soldiers, and opposition to profiteering. Cudlipp returned as editor in 1946, and Campbell moved to become managing editor of The People, and effectively running it from day to day. Within two years, he had completely redesigned the paper, and began running confessionals by people who were not famous. In 1950 his reporter, Duncan Webb, exposed the prostitution empire of the Messina brothers.

Campbell finally took over the official post of editor in 1957, serving in the role until his death in 1966. From 1961 to 1964, he also served on the Press Council. During his editorship, People reporter Michael Gabbert uncovered the 1964 British betting scandal, which ended with ten British professional footballers being given jail sentences for match fixing.

Media offices
Preceded by Hugh Cudlipp	Editor of the Sunday Pictorial; 1940–1946	Succeeded by Hugh Cudlipp
Preceded by Harry Ainsworth	Editor of The People; 1957–1966	Succeeded by Bob Edwards
