= Sunday People =

Tabloid newspaper published in London

- Front page on 4 December 2016
- Type: Sunday newspaper
- Format: Red top
- Owner: Reach plc
- Editor: Chloe Hubbard
- Founded: 16 October 1881
- Language: English
- Headquarters: London
- Circulation: 38,108 (as of September 2025)
- ISSN: 0307-7292
- Website: mirror.co.uk/sunday-people

The Sunday People is a British tabloid Sunday newspaper. It was founded as The People on 16 October 1881.

At one point owned by Odhams Press, The People was acquired along with Odhams by the Mirror Group in 1961, along with the Daily Herald, which eventually became The Sun. It switched from broadsheet to tabloid on 22 September 1974.

The Sunday People is now published by Reach plc, and shares a website with the Mirror papers. In July 2011, when it benefited from the closure of the News of the World, it had an average Sunday circulation of 806,544. By December 2016 the circulation had shrunk to 239,364 and by August 2020 to 125,216.

== Notable events ==
In March 1951 the Sunday People (then known as The People) published an article claiming that the British military had allowed Iban mercenaries to collect scalps from human corpses in the ongoing Malayan Emergency war. British colonial officials saw this article as a potential propaganda threat and drew plans to release a rebuttal in the Straits Times. The paper's claims would later be proven true following the British Malayan headhunting scandal.

== Notable columnists ==
- Garry Bushell had a two-page television opinion column, "Bushell on the Box", but left in early 2007, later moving to the Daily Star Sunday.
- Jimmy Greaves, the former England footballer
- Fred Trueman, former England cricketer and fast bowler
- Fred Harrison, an established economics author of 19 books
- Dean Dunham, consumer columnist and leading authority on Consumer protection.

== Editors ==
- 1881: Sebastian Evans
- 1890: Harry Benjamin Vogel
- 1900: Joseph Hatton
- 1913: John Sansome
- 1922: Robert Donald
- 1924: Hannen Swaffer
- 1925: Harry Ainsworth
- 1957: Stuart Campbell
- 1966: Bob Edwards
- 1972: Geoffrey Pinnington
- 1982: Nicholas Lloyd
- 1984: Richard Stott
- 1985: Ernie Burrington
- 1988: John Blake
- 1989: Wendy Henry
- 1989: Ernie Burrington (acting)
- 1990: Richard Stott
- 1991: Bill Hagerty
- 1992: Bridget Rowe
- 1996: Brendon Parsons
- 1998: Neil Wallis
- 2003: Mark Thomas
- 2008: Lloyd Embley
- 2012: James Scott
- 2014: Alison Phillips
- 2016: Gary Jones
- 2018: Peter Willis
- 2020: Paul Henderson
- 2021: Gemma Aldridge
- 2024: Caroline Waterston
- 2025: to date Chloe Hubbard

=== Digital Archive ===
The paper (1881-1999) on both British Newspaper Archive and Newspapers.com recent years at Pressdisplay.com.
