= North Devon Hospice =

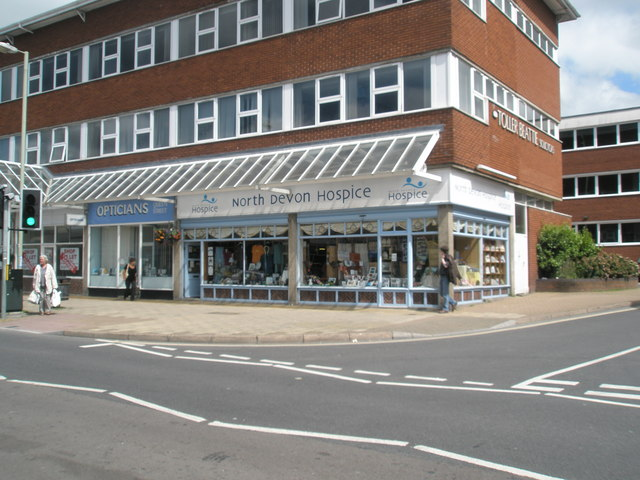
- North Devon Hospice shop in Barnstaple
- Formation: 22 March 1983
- Type: Charity
- Purpose: Provides palliative care
- Headquarters: Barnstaple
- Region served: North Devon
- Key people: Stephen Roberts (chief executive)
- Budget: £3.88 million (2020)
- Revenue: £7.51 million (2020)
- Staff: 195 (2020)
- Volunteers: 485 (2020)
- Website: www.northdevonhospice.org.uk

The North Devon Hospice is a charity based in Barnstaple, Devon, England, which provides palliative care. It was established in 1983.

It operates a hospice in Barnstaple and palliative home care. It is developing a new base in the grounds of the Holsworthy Medical Centre.

== History ==
In 2014, it won the UK Charity of the Year award.

In June 2020, the Hospice's volunteers were awarded the Queen's Award for Voluntary Service.

== Notable fundraising challenge (2020–2023) ==
In 2020 11-year-old Max Woosey from Braunton, began raising money for the hospice, which had cared for his late neighbour Rick, by camping in his back garden. In August 2021 he spent his 500th consecutive night under canvass, by which time he had raised over £640,000. In November 2021, Woosey was given a Pride of Britain 'Spirit of Adventure' Award presented by Bear Grylls, and invited to spend the night camping on the pitch at Twickenham Stadium. Invited by the award organisers to spend the night before the ceremony in a hotel, he instead slept on its balcony. Woosey was awarded the British Empire Medal in the 2022 New Year Honours. In March 2023, Woosey announced he would end his challenge on 1 April with "a final celebratory camp-out festival". Stephen Roberts, the hospice's chief executive, said that Woosey's contributions had directly funded 15 nurses for a year.
