= Caroline Waterston =

British newspaper editor

Caroline Waterston (born November 1978) is a former British newspaper editor.

Waterston began working for Trinity Mirror in 2001. She rose to become deputy editor of the Sunday Mirror and Sunday People, then deputy editor-in-chief of the Daily Star and Daily Express. She then became leader of Reach plc's magazine and supplement group, leading changes to the online presence of OK! magazine and the launch of a linked beauty box subscription. In February 2024, she became acting editor-in-chief of the Daily Mirror, taking the position on a permanent basis in April. She later also took on the responsibility of editing the Sunday Mirror and Sunday People.

Waterston stepped down from editing the Daily Mirror, Sunday Mirror, Sunday People and Reach plc's magazine and supplements in December 2025 after less than two years. She was replaced by Chloe Hubbard.

Media offices
Preceded by Charlotte Seligman	Editor-in-Chief of OK! 2020–present	Succeeded by Incumbent
Preceded by Alison Phillips	Editor of the Daily Mirror; 2024–present	Succeeded by Incumbent
Preceded by Gemma Aldridge	Editor of the Sunday Mirror and Sunday People; 2024–present	Succeeded by Incumbent
