= Andrea Spyropoulos =

British nurse and clinical strategist

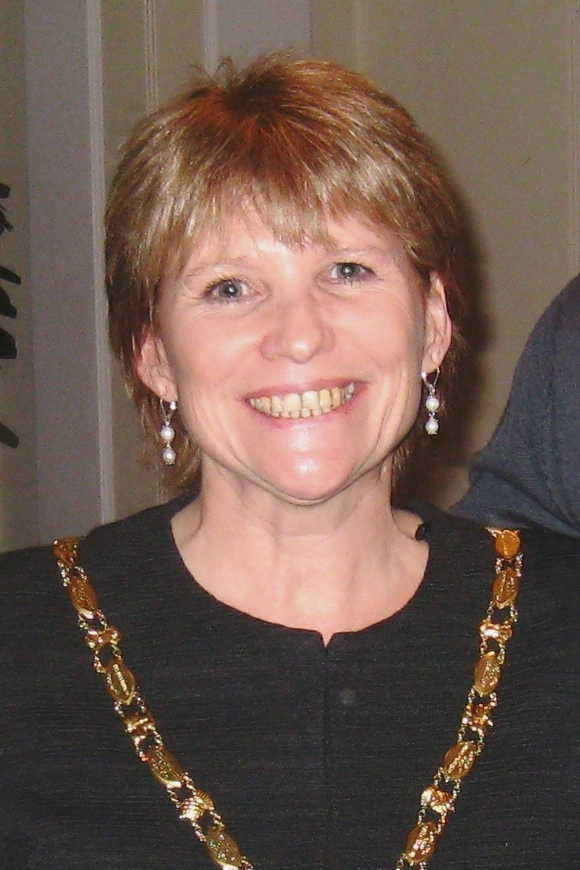

38th President of the Royal College of Nursing
- In office 2010–2015
- Preceded by: Maura Buchanan
- Succeeded by: Cecilia Anim

Personal details
- Occupation: Nurse, Midwife, Senior Lecturer

Andrea Spyropoulos, RGN, SCM, RNT, is a British nurse, clinical strategist and a past president of the Royal College of Nursing (RCN).

== Early life and education ==
Born in Liverpool, her career started with nursing and has spanned a number of disciplines including midwifery, academia and the planning and development of new hospital projects. She obtained a number of academic degrees, i.e. a BA in Health Studies, an LLB (Hons) in Law and an LLM degree in Medical Law. She furthermore received a Diploma in Professional Studies in Nursing (DPSN) and qualified as a Registered General Nurse (RGN), a State Certified Midwife (SCM) and a Registered Nurse Teacher (RNT).

== Career ==
Spyropoulos trained as a nurse at the former Royal Liverpool United Hospitals Group in 1976. She has more than 30 years nursing experience, including working as a Midwife and then a senior lecturer at Liverpool John Moores University, teaching Health Care and later Medical Law.

She worked on the trust board of Clatterbridge Centre for Oncology for 9 years as a non-executive director. During her term she chaired Independent Panel Reviews and the Research Governance Committee as well as sitting on the performance, audit, investment and remuneration committees. She stepped down from this role on 31 January 2007.

In 2003, she joined Health Care Projects Social Infrastructure. Now working as a Clinical Strategist, she provides expert clinical advice to hospital design teams.

== Work with the Royal College of Nursing ==
Spyropoulos became a member of the Royal College of Nursing when she was 18. Appointed as a steward in 1988, since that time she has held a number of other unpaid roles within the organisation including positions as Safety Representative, Council Member and chair of Nursing Practice and Policy Committee before being elected to the role of president in 2010. She has represented the RCN in several fora, including at its Congress events and notably also at conferences hosted in the UK Parliament's House of Commons.

Spyropoulos thanked RCN members and colleagues stating that she was "really looking forward to representing the RCN and its members at the highest level.". A month later she represented the RCN at the European Parliament's 'EU Public Health Alliance'.
