= The New Day (newspaper) =

Former British newspaper

- Front page of the first edition of The New Day
- Publisher: Trinity Mirror
- Editor: Alison Phillips
- Launched: 29 February 2016
- Ceased publication: 6 May 2016
- Language: English
- Sister newspapers: Daily Mirror, Sunday Mirror, Sunday People
- Website: The New Day

The New Day was a British compact daily newspaper published by Trinity Mirror, launched on 29 February 2016. It was mainly aimed at a middle-aged female audience, and was politically neutral. The editor, Alison Phillips, intended readers to get through the newspaper in under 30 minutes.

The first edition was distributed as two million free copies, and the target for regular circulation was 200,000. After a drop in purchases to just 30,000 copies per day, it was announced on 4 May in the same year that the last edition would be published two days later, just two months after its launch.

== Launch ==
The New Day was owned by Trinity Mirror, which also owns the Daily Mirror, Sunday Mirror, and Sunday People. It was first published for free on Monday 29 February 2016, as the first new British national daily newspaper since the i in 2010, and the first new standalone title since The Independent in 1986. The newspaper, 40 pages long, was primarily aimed at a female audience between 35 and 55. It was edited by Alison Phillips, who had held the same position at the Sunday Mirror and Sunday People. It was published by a staff of 25, most of whom were on short-term contracts or borrowed from the publishers' other titles. There were "five or six" columnists; unlike most newspapers they did not have set days on which they wrote. The paper had no affiliation with any political party, unlike many British papers, and was aimed at people who bought no other daily newspaper.

It established an online presence through social media as opposed to a website. Trinity Mirror chief executive Simon Fox said the paper filled "a gap in the market for a daily newspaper designed to co-exist in a digital age". Fox said that the number of people buying a daily newspaper had been declining by 500,000 a year, and those readers could be tempted to consider The New Day.

Phillips eschewed traditional newspaper structures, saying the team had "started with a blank piece of paper" and a typical reader should be able to digest the entire content within 30 minutes. She aimed to differentiate the newspaper from its right-wing competitors the Daily Mail and Daily Express, saying "We are speaking to modern families in the language they use and with the positivity about what they feel in their lives", and claimed that research favours balanced opinion. A press release issued by the publishers of The New Day stated that the paper would "...report with an upbeat, optimistic approach and will be politically neutral". A report in The Guardian suggested the paper could attract readers away from the Mail and Express.

In Scotland, The New Day was sold only in Edinburgh. Fox believed that a separate Scottish staff would have been needed for it to be sold across Scotland, because it would have been dismissed as "too English" due to the differences in government policy between the two countries.

== Cessation of publication ==
Trinity Mirror had a decline in revenue and profit in 2015, and it was hoped that the new title would reverse that. Its first edition was distributed as two million free copies. Sales figures were to be kept secret, until April's figures would be published by the Audit Bureau of Circulations.

After a two-week period costing 25p, the regular price was to rise to 50p, but the date of the rise was postponed slightly, eventually rising to 50p on Thursday 17 March 2016.

Fox aimed to have a regular circulation of 200,000. A further Guardian report on 20 March suggested the paper may only have been selling 90,000 copies per day. Later reports revealed that its circulation had been between 30,000 and 40,000.

On 4 May 2016, within 10 weeks of its launch, it was announced that the final edition of The New Day would be published on 6 May. A Trinity Mirror spokeswoman would not comment on claims that it was running at an annual loss of £1 million.

Roy Greenslade explained in The Guardian how The New Day had failed. He pinpointed the error of marketing a newspaper to people who dislike newspapers, and the short interval between the announcement and launch, which left insufficient time to advertise the product. On a practical basis, it was published early in the evening because it shared presses with the Daily Mirror, thus it missed out on late-night breaking news such as Leicester City's shock win of the Premier League. Greenslade attributed all of the blame to Fox for green-lighting the idea.
