= Richard Emanuel =

Richard J M Emanuel (born 29 October 1967) is a British businessman and investor. He founded his first company DX Communications at the age of 23, which grew from a one person start-up to an organisation of over 1,000 people within a 5-year period. The company was acquired by British Telecom's subsidiary BT Cellnet in September 1999. Following this, Emanuel has gone on to build a number of successful companies.

Emanuel remains active in the technology sector, with a focus on working with high-growth companies. In March 2020 he joined the Board of MARSS Group, a technology security company, and one of the fastest growing privately owned businesses in its sector. He is also the non-executive Chairman of EIP Limited, a InsurTech company, supplying corporate clients with subscription insurance and claims management.

Alongside this, Emanuel has a personal interest in the healthy ageing sector having lost his mother to dementia. Following this, he co-founded Brain Health Network in 2020 - an organisation dedicated to helping people keep their brain healthy and to lower the risk of neurodegenerative diseases such as Alzheimer's (the most common type of dementia). He has received various awards and recognition during his business career, including an MBE received from Queen Elizabeth II in 2000. He has also been a member of the Young Presidents' Organization since 2000, and is a past Chairman of their Monaco chapter.

== Early life ==
Richard Emanuel was born on 29 October 1967, to academics Lois Emanuel (née Metcalfe) and Dr Ronald Emanuel. He spent his early life in the city of Glasgow attending Hutchesons' Grammar School. He was active in sports, excelling in both boxing and swimming.

== Early career ==
In 1990, Emanuel founded his first company, DX Communications, which operated in the cellular telecoms sector. The company was a one person start-up and was funded initially by his own savings and a £500 loan from his grandmother, Ivy. In the years that followed, DX grew to an organisation of over 1,000 people, with operations across the UK. In September 1999, the company was acquired by British Telecom's subsidiary BT Cellnet for a reported £42m. Emanuel remained active in the telecom and technology sector through the 2000s, building a number of companies in mainland Europe and North Africa.

== Business career ==
Emanuel's primary business and investment focus is working with high-growth technology companies.

In March 2020 he joined the Board of MARSS Group, a technology company focused on the protection of lives and critical infrastructure.

He also co-founded Brain Health Network, an organisation dedicated to helping people lower their risk of dementia and to keep their brain healthy as they age. He became interested in the growing body of research indicating that it is possible to significantly lower the risk of developing neurodegenerative diseases such as Alzheimer’s (the most common type of dementia) – in part by maintaining a healthy brain. This area is of personal importance for Emanuel, whose mother had dementia.

== Personal life ==
In 2008 Emanuel married Judith Halmshaw, a businesswoman and founder of the men's yoga wear brand Warrior Addict in Beaulieu-Sur-Mer in the South of France. The couple, who have two children, a girl and a boy, lived together in Monaco before they separated on amicable terms in 2016.

== Awards and nominations ==
Emanuel has received various business awards and honours throughout his career including an MBE presented by Queen Elizabeth at Buckingham Palace in 2000.
