= Maura Buchanan =

British nursing administrator

- Education: Glasgow Caledonian University
- Occupation: nurse
- Known for: President of the Royal College of Nursing
- Medical career
- Field: neurosurgircal nursing
- Institutions: University of Glasgow; John Radcliffe Hospital, Oxford

Maura Buchanan is a British nursing administrator who was President of the Royal College of Nursing from 2006 to 2010.

== Career ==
She began her nursing career with a BA and RGN from Glasgow Caledonian University and then worked as a research assistant at the University of Glasgow. She specialised in neurosurgical nursing. She earned a postgraduate diplomas in clinical neurosciences and health law and ethics.

In 1993 she moved to Oxford to become Senior Nurse at the John Radcliffe Hospital.

She was Deputy President of the Royal College of Nursing for four years and President from 2006 to 2010. She held several roles within the organisation including Chair of RCN Congress (1998–2002).

On 14 October 2004 she gave evidence to the House of Lords Select Committee on the Assisted Dying for the Terminally Ill Bill.
