= Gary Jones (journalist) =

British journalist

Gary Jones is a British journalist who was editor of the Daily Express from March 2018 until September 2024. Earlier in his career he was on the staff of the News of the World, The Sunday People and the Daily Mirror. From 2016 to 2018. Jones was the Editor of the Sunday Mirror and The Sunday People.

== Early life ==
Jones is the son of Conservative Party-supporting lifelong Daily Express-reading parents. He trained at journalist college in Preston, Lancashire, now part of the University of Central Lancashire.

== Career ==
In April 1995, while at the News of the World when Piers Morgan was editor, Jones was named Reporter of the Year at the British Press Awards. Later, at the Daily Mirror (Morgan was editor), Jones was one of "three key media contacts" for Southern Investigations, a private detective agency whose investigator Jonathan Rees is said to have "set up [a] network of corrupt police, customs officials, taxmen and bank staff to gain valuable information". Rees was recorded by police telling Jones "that some of what he was doing for the Mirror was illegal".

While Jones was investigations editor at the Mirror in December 1999, the paper published detailed extracts from the medical records of Ian Brady, having paid an intermediary £1,500. The Law Lords ruled in 2002 that the newspaper must reveal its source. He moved to The People in November 2007, becoming deputy editor in June 2008.

He was formerly deputy editor of The People and later editor. After a period as acting editor, he also became editor of the Sunday Mirror in May 2016.

In March 2018 Jones was named as the new editor of the Express after it was sold by Northern & Shell to Trinity Mirror (now Reach plc). On taking on the role Jones admitted in an interview with The Guardian that the title's past troubled him. "I just couldn't sleep. People had collated every front page which was anti-immigrant. It was certainly Islamophobic. This was not representative of the kind of society I think we should be."

In an interview with The Guardian's Media editor, Jones said that in his first morning news meeting he gave an instruction to staff on the spot: "I'm not going to be doing an anti-immigrant story. Ever. Do not put them on the schedule."

In an interview with Channel 4 News's Krishnan Guru-Murthy for the Ways to Change the World podcast, Jones was asked what his biggest success was in terms of change, to which he replied "We were on… Stop Funding Hate's list. That kind of troubled me greatly. You know, 'Stop Funding Hate' – I mean the mere words don't resonate well with anybody. And they published a report actually not long into my tenure that kind of said look, they noted the Express had changed – and that was really important to me…"

Since his appointment, Jones has placed an emphasis on campaigning journalism and investigative news stories, "regained that campaigning investigative zeal that has always been attached to the name".

In December 2020, The Express won the British Journalism Award for Campaign Journalism after the 18-month-long Time To End Cystic Fibrosis Drug Scandal campaign successfully fought for a life-saving deal between US pharmaceuticals firm Vertex and the NHS. The paper also ran a two year domestic abuse campaign which resulted in a change in law in April 2021; with an overhaul of the family courts system, putting extra safeguards in place to protect abuse victims.

In February 2021, the Express launched a seven-month-long Green Britain Campaign, encouraging people to live more sustainably and put pressure on the government to help support sustainable businesses. The title launched a change.org petition asking people to urge the government to create a Zero 4 Zero policy to boost the tax system by scrapping VAT on low or zero carbon products.

Jones left his role at the Express in September 2024.

== Personal life ==
Gary Jones' son, Monty Jones, was a chorister at Westminster Abbey Choir School before being accepted to Eton College.

Jones is a trustee of the St Giles Trust, a charity that helps the disadvantaged and vulnerable.

Media offices
Preceded by Alison Phillips	Editor of the Sunday Mirror and the Sunday People; 2016–2018	Succeeded by Peter Willis
Preceded by Hugh Whittow	Editor of the Daily Express; 2018–2024	Succeeded by Tom Hunt
