= Ampfield =

Village and parish in Hampshire, England

Coordinates: 51°00′41″N 1°25′21″W

- Village
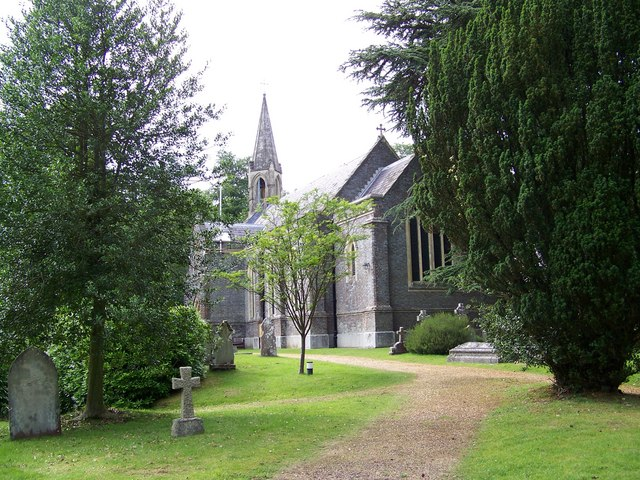
- St Mark's Church

- Location within Hampshire
- Population: 1,474 (2001); 1,583 (2011 Census)
- OS grid reference: SU406237
- Civil parish: Ampfield
- District: Test Valley
- Shire county: Hampshire
- Region: South East
- Country: England
- Sovereign state: United Kingdom
- Post town: Romsey
- Postcode district: SO51
- Dialling code: 01794
- Police: Hampshire and Isle of Wight
- Fire: Hampshire and Isle of Wight
- Ambulance: South Central
- UK Parliament: Romsey and Southampton North

Ampfield is a village and civil parish in the Borough of Test Valley in Hampshire, England, between Romsey, Eastleigh, and Winchester. It had a population at the 2001 census of 1,474, increasing to 1,583 at the 2011 Census. The civil parish of Ampfield falls into the Ward of Ampfield & Braishfield.

== Geography ==
Ampfield lies on sands and clays of Eocene age near the northern edge of the Hampshire Basin. Ampfield Wood on the London Clay to the north of the village is crossed by the Monarch's Way long distance footpath. The parish includes the hamlets of Knapp and Gosport.

== Church ==
The village church is dedicated to St Mark. Its construction took 3 years, finishing in 1841. The site and the cost of the church was provided by Sir William Heathcote. It has stained glass windows by W Butterworth dating from the 1850s. It is a Grade II listed building.

== Amenities ==
There is one school in the village, Ampfield CofE Primary School The Potters Heron Hotel, with its thatched roof, was built in 1937. The White Horse pub, in the village centre, is a Grade II listed building.

The Sir Harold Hillier Gardens is situated in Ampfield. The arboretum covers 180 acres (73 ha) and has over 42,000 trees and shrubs.

== Personalities ==
The author of the Thomas the Tank Engine series of books, Rev. W Awdry, was born in Ampfield Vicarage.
