= Mark Thomas (newspaper editor) =

British former newspaper editor (born 1967)

Mark David Thomas is a British former newspaper editor who now works in public relations. He was formerly the deputy editor at the Sunday Mirror.

== Early life and education ==
Thomas grew up in south London, where he attended Rutlish School, Merton Park.

== Career ==
He entered journalism in 1988, as a reporter for The People. In 1994, he moved to the News of the World, where he rose to become a chief reporter.

He joined the Daily Mirror in 1997 as features editor, then became assistant editor and, in 2001, deputy editor. In 2003, he was appointed editor of The People, and remained in the post until 2008.

He then founded TM Media PR. He was also worked as Director of Marketing & Fundraising at the Hospital of St John and St Elizabeth, 60 Grove End Road, St John's Wood, London NW8 for over a decade via TM Media which then acted for King Edward VII Hospital.

Media offices
Preceded by Tina Weaver	Deputy Editor of the Daily Mirror; 2001–2003	Succeeded by Des Kelly
Preceded by Neil Wallis	Editor of The People; 2003–2008	Succeeded by Lloyd Embley
