= Hugh Whittow =

British former newspaper editor

Hugh Whittow is a British former newspaper editor.

Whittow worked for the Western Telegraph and the South Wales Echo, before moving to London to work on the London Evening News, and then the Daily Star. In the mid-1980s, he joined The Sun, where he became known for obtaining scoops. In October 1986, Whittow became one of the first journalists to report that Queen singer Freddie Mercury could be suffering from AIDS.

In 1987, Whittow travelled to Spain with a brief to purchase a donkey which was due to be beaten as part of a fiesta, and send it to a sanctuary in the UK. However, a Daily Star journalist achieved this before him, and his newspaper taunted The Sun over this in a front-page story. Soon after, Whittow returned to the Star.

Whittow became deputy editor of the Daily Star, and edited the Daily Star Sunday from its launch until 2003, then became Deputy Editor of the Daily Express. In February 2011, he was promoted to become Editor of the paper. He retired from his role at the Express at the beginning of March 2018.

Media offices
Preceded by New position	Editor of the Daily Star Sunday; 2002–2003	Succeeded by Gareth Morgan
Preceded by Nicola Briggs	Deputy Editor of the Daily Express; 2003–2011	Succeeded by Michael Booker
Preceded by Peter Hill	Editor of the Daily Express; 2011–2018	Succeeded by Gary Jones
