= Richard Wallace (journalist) =

British newspaper editor (born 1961)

Richard Wallace (born 1961) was the editor of British newspaper the Daily Mirror until May 2012.

== Early career ==
Wallace began his Fleet Street career working for the Daily Mail and The Sun. In 1990 he joined the Daily Mirror. During Piers Morgan's editorship of the paper he became show business editor, before becoming head of news in 2000. Notable among Wallace's scoops was the news that actor Ross Kemp was leaving the BBC soap opera EastEnders in favour of working for rival channel ITV. He was also responsible for the creation of the gossip columnists The 3AM Girls.

In 2002 he swapped jobs with the paper's New York editor, Andy Lines. Ten months later, in 2003, he became deputy editor of the Sunday Mirror.

== Editor ==
Wallace was appointed editor of the Daily Mirror in 2004 on the dismissal of editor Piers Morgan for publishing false images of British soldiers in Iraq. The Daily Mirror was named Newspaper of The Year at the What the Papers Say Awards in December 2006.

The Mirror was one of several newspapers which paid "substantial" damages for defamation for their December 2010 coverage of the arrest of Christopher Jefferies in connection with the Murder of Joanna Yeates; Jeffries subsequently being exonerated. The publishers of the Mirror were later prosecuted for contempt of court for the way they had reported Jefferies' arrest, and fined £50,000. Their appeal against the fine was rejected by the Supreme Court. During the Leveson Inquiry, established by Prime Minister David Cameron to investigate the ethics and behaviour of the British media following the News of the World phone hacking affair, Wallace described the newspaper's coverage of Jefferies's arrest as a "black mark" on his editing record.

In May 2012, Wallace was sacked as editor of the Daily Mirror "with immediate effect". after Trinity Mirror decided to merge the Daily & Sunday Mirror titles and slash editorial budgets.

== Later career ==
In September 2012 he joined Simon Cowell's entertainment company Syco as a consultant.

In 2013 Cowell appointed him Syco's Executive Producer on the company's hit show America's Got Talent, broadcast on NBC.

In October 2017 Wallace was made Senior Vice President (TV & Production) for Syco.

== Personal ==
He married long-time partner Tina Weaver, former Editor of the Sunday Mirror, in June 2016 at Aynhoe Park, Oxford.

Media offices
Preceded by Mark Thomas	Deputy Editor of the Sunday Mirror; 2003–2004	Succeeded by James Scott
Preceded by Piers Morgan	Editor of the Daily Mirror; 2004–2012	Succeeded by Peter Willis
