= Peter Willis (journalist) =

British journalist (1966–2021)

Peter Willis (25 December 1966 – 25 June 2021) was a British journalist and newspaper editor.

Born in London, Willis grew up in French Guiana, Manchester and then Buxton. There, he was educated at Buxton College, and presented a hospital radio show at the Devonshire Royal Hospital. At the age of 18, he began working for the Manchester Evening News.

Willis later worked for The Sun, the Daily Star and the Daily Express, becoming known for his celebrity reporting. In 1997, he moved to the Daily Mirror, as the first editor of its Saturday magazine, The Look. He then served for many years as features editor of the newspaper, and founded the Pride of Britain Awards.

In 2012, Willis was appointed editor of the Mirror, serving until 2018, when he moved to become editor of the Sunday Mirror and the Sunday People. Fearing he was about to lose his job, he committed suicide on 25 June 2021, at the age of 54.

Media offices
Preceded by Richard Wallace	Editor of the Daily Mirror; 2012–2018	Succeeded by Alison Phillips
Preceded by Gary Jones	Editor of the Sunday Mirror and the Sunday People; 2018–2020	Succeeded by Paul Henderson
