= Daily Star Sunday =

Newspaper

- Type: Weekly newspaper
- Format: Tabloid
- Owner: Reach plc
- Publisher: Reach plc
- Editor: Denis Mann
- Founded: 15 September 2002; 23 years ago
- Headquarters: London, EC3; United Kingdom
- Circulation: 54,101 (as of September 2025)
- Sister newspapers: Daily Star
- Website: dailystar.co.uk/sunday

The Daily Star Sunday is a weekly tabloid newspaper published in the United Kingdom. It was launched as a sister title to the Daily Star on 15 September 2002.

The Daily Star Sunday is published by Express Newspapers, which along with the Daily Star also publishes the Daily Express and Sunday Express. The group was formerly owned by Richard Desmond's Northern and Shell company but is now part of Reach plc (formerly Trinity Mirror). The paper predominantly features stories about celebrities, sport, and news and gossip about popular television programmes, such as soap operas and reality TV shows.

The current editor is Denis Mann, who replaced Stuart James after Reach plc took control of the title in 2018.

== Regular features ==
The newspaper features a picture of a glamorous woman on Page 3. It is always nudity-free.

Other regular features in the Daily Star Sunday include Bushell On The Box, a TV column by Garry Bushell, a film column by Andy Lea and Ed Gleave's Hot TV column. Football, racing and rugby league make up the bulk of the sports pages, with the weekend's football action covered in depth in the Result pullout. In addition, the Irish edition covers Gaelic Games and the domestic soccer scene.

The newspaper features a large amount of showbiz coverage, including many reality TV and soap stories. There is also weekly coverage of troops, crime and consumer stories.

It celebrated its tenth anniversary in late 2012.

== Controversy ==
=== Madeleine McCann ===
Both the Daily Star Sunday and its daily equivalent, as well as its stablemates the Daily Express and Sunday Express, featured heavy coverage of the disappearance of Madeleine McCann in May 2007. In 2008 the McCann family sued the Star and Express for libel. The action concerned more than 100 stories across the Daily Express, Daily Star and their Sunday sisters, which accused the McCanns of involvement in their daughter's disappearance. The newspapers' coverage was regarded by the McCanns as grossly defamatory. In a settlement at the High Court of Justice, the newspapers agreed to run a front-page apology to the McCanns on 19 March 2008, publish another apology on the front pages of the Sunday editions on 23 March and make a statement of apology at the High Court. They also agreed to pay costs and substantial damages, which the McCanns plan to use to aid their search for their daughter. In its apology, the Daily Star apologised for printing "stories suggesting the couple were responsible for, or may be responsible for, the death of their daughter Madeleine and for covering it up" and stated that "We now recognise that such a suggestion is absolutely untrue and that Kate and Gerry are completely innocent of any involvement in their daughter's disappearance."

== Editors ==
- Hugh Whittow (2002–03)
- Gareth Morgan (2003–2013)
- Peter Carbery (2013–15)
- Stuart James (2015–18)
- Denis Mann (2018–present)

== Political allegiance ==
Like its sister paper the Daily Star, the Daily Star Sunday carries fewer political stories than its rivals, and it has never openly supported one political party. However its political stance has been seen to be more centre-ground than the right-of-centre Daily Star, and when the daily paper was accused of supporting the far-right English Defence League, the Sunday version pointedly spoke out against the group.
