= Prehistoric Peeps (film) =

1905 British one-reeler film

Prehistoric Peeps is a 1905 British one-reeler film, starring Sebastian Smith, directed by Lewin Fitzhamon and produced by the Hepworth Manufacturing Company. The only existing print has been preserved by the British Film Institute.

The film is one of the "cavemen comedies", an early film genre which was inspired by the cartoon series Prehistoric Peeps by Edward Tennyson Reed. The film depicts the first onscreen non-avian dinosaurs in film history, portrayed by actors inside pantomime models. A low quality copy of the film was uploaded onto YouTube in 2024. Additionally, a higher quality copy was uploaded in July 2026, and a full quality copy was uploaded in September 2026.

== Plot ==
The full film

The film depicts the dream of a sleeping scientist. He dreams of being lowered into a cave, surrounded by its stalactites. A prehistoric monster comes to life, and chases him within the cave. The scientist uses his revolver to shoot the monster, but the bullets seem to have no effect on it.

The scientist emerges on the ground above the cave, and the monster continues to chase him. The monster eventually succumbs to its bullet wounds. The scientist is then surrounded by prehistoric women, who live in grass huts. More monsters appear and chase the scientist and the women away.

In the waking world, the scientist's wife discovers him asleep in his own laboratory. He is surrounded by his fossil collection. The wife uses a soda siphon to wake up the scientist.

== Analysis ==
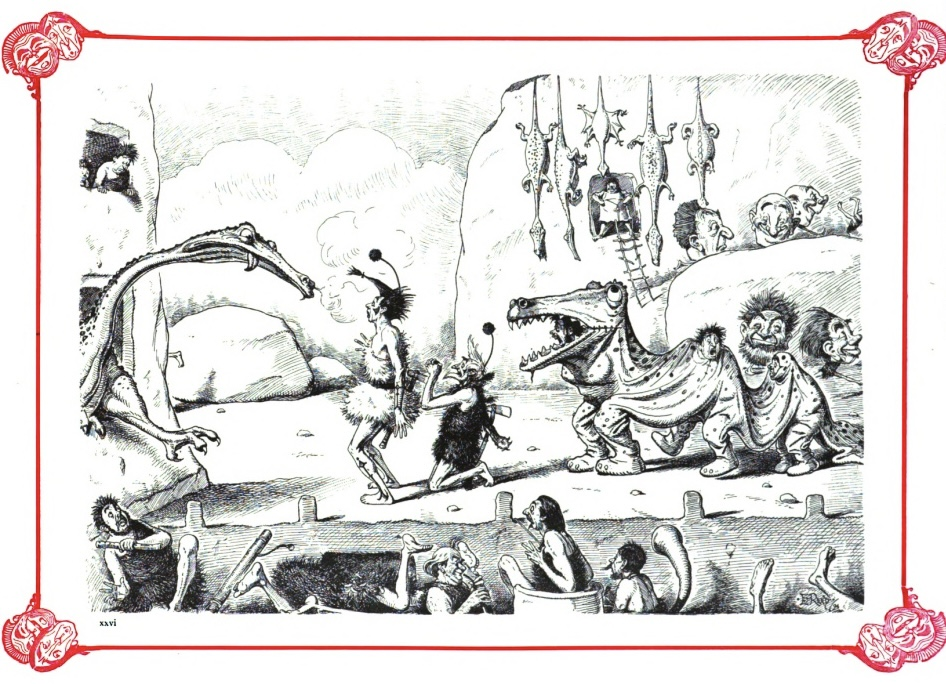
A Prehistoric Peeps cartoon by Reed that depicts a pantomime costume not unlike those used in the film.

In the 1880s, parodies and cartoons of cavemen became popular. In 1893, cartoonist Edward Tennyson Reed launched the cartoon series Prehistoric Peeps in the British humor magazine Punch. One of Reed's best known drawings depicted a caveman tribe playing cricket at Stonehenge, using the monument's stone arches as wickets. The drawing inspired a humorous hoax. The hoaxer carved a mammoth bone into a cricket bat. Then the bat was planted at Piltdown, Sussex, alongside a forged fossil skull. It was implied to be the earliest Englishman, buried with the earliest cricket bat. This joke became known as the Piltdown Man.

The 1905 film is based on Reed's work. It takes the form of a live-action silent film comedy. It became the first dinosaur film, and depicts cavemen living alongside dinosaurs. This depiction formed part of an artistic tradition, later represented by the comic strip Alley Oop (1932-) and the television series The Flintstones (1960–1966). This artistic tradition may have influenced the Creationist fantasies of actual prehistoric people living alongside dinosaurs.

== See also ==
- List of films featuring dinosaurs
