= Helen Hoppner Coode =

English illustrator

- Born: c. 1831 (after 1830, before 1834); Lambeth
- Died: 30 November 1915; Lyme Regis
- Known for: Illustrator, painter, watercolourist, writer

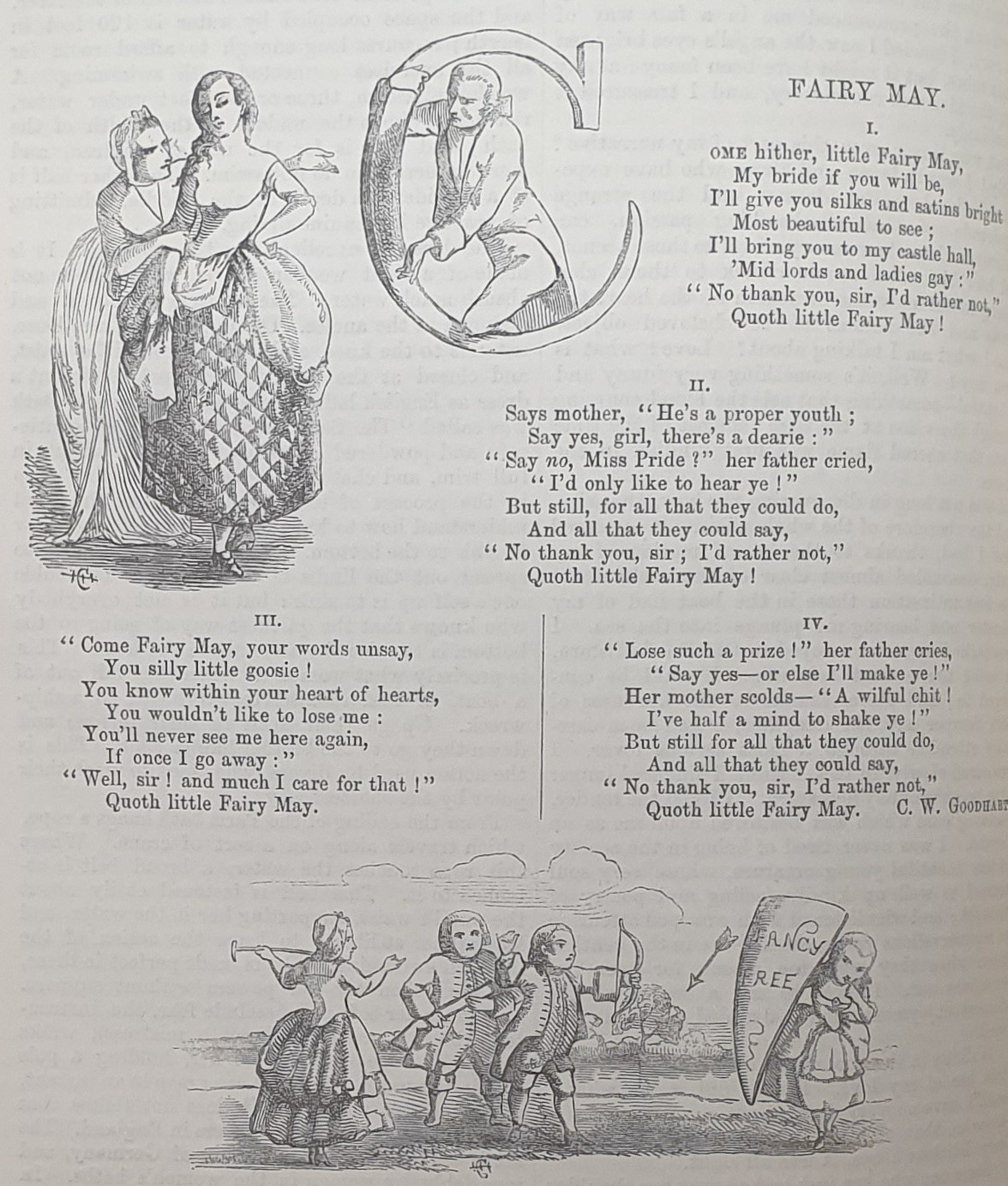
Illustration by Helen Hoppner Coode for 'Fairy May' (1859)

Helen Hoppner Coode (c. 1831 - 1915) was an English illustrator, watercolourist and short story writer. She was the first known female contributor to Punch Magazine.

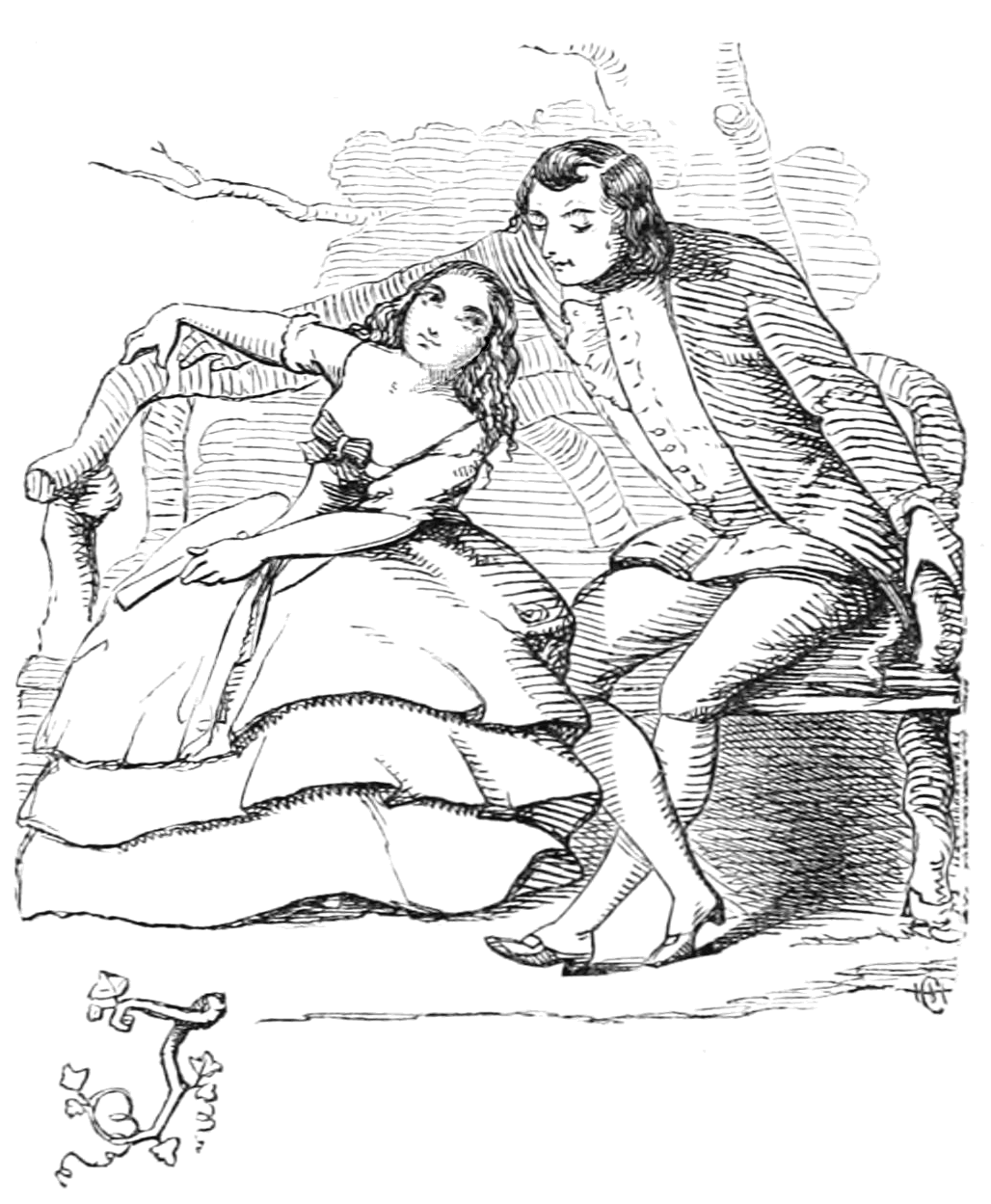
Illustration by Helen Hoppner Coode for 'Little Rogue!' (1860)

== Biography ==
Coode was born in Lambeth, London and was the daughter of a barrister. Coode contributed nineteen drawings to Punch Magazine and is recognised as its first woman contributor. Her work first appeared in the magazine in November 1859 and continued through to January 1861. These included illuminated letters or small sketches accompanying articles. She signed her illustrations with a monogram. During this time she also contributed illustrations to Once a Week, this included drawings for the poem "Fairy May" written by C. W. Goodhart which was printed in the magazine in 1859. She was a member of the Society of Female Artists and her work was often included in their exhibitions. Coode also had her work exhibited in Manchester, at the British Institution, and at the Royal Academy between 1859 and 1882.

Coode published at least one book, which included the short stories The Strange Story of Eugenia, The Necromancer's Hand and Martin Sans-Tête. These were described in Public Opinion (1885) as 'three highly spiced sensational tales by Miss H. H. Coode'.

== Awards ==
- Royal Academy Exhibition Prize in 1867

== Selected works ==
- The Strange Story of Eugenia, The Necromancer’s Hand (1885) [written and illustrated]
- "By Act of Parliament, 6 & 7 Edw. XV., A.D. 2041" in Belgravia Christmas Annual (1893)
- "Fairy May" by Charles Woide Goodhart in Once a Week, Series 1, 1 (1859) [illustrated]
- "Little Rogue!" by Reverend J. Steadman in Once a Week, Series 1, 2 (1860) [illustrated]
