= Chris Hutchins =

English author and journalist (1941–2024)

- Born: Christopher Neville Hutchins; 23 June 1941
- Died: 27 June 2024 (aged 83)
- Occupations: Author; journalist; public relations practitioner
- Notable credit(s): Sunday Mirror, Daily Express, Today, Punch
- Website: www.chrishutchins.info

Christopher Neville Hutchins (23 June 1941 – 27 June 2024) was an English author, journalist and public relations practitioner.

== Early life ==
Hutchins was the younger of two sons and one daughter of Edward Victor Hutchins (d. 1944) and Kathleen Violet Ness (d 1995). He was educated at Torquay Boys' Grammar School. In 1956, he began a fan club for ventriloquist Terry Hall and Lenny the Lion. Hutchins lost interest when he discovered Elvis Presley and girls. Hutchins then landed a job as a journalist on the Mid Devon Times on a salary of £2-a-week.

In 1961, Hutchins joined the NME (New Musical Express) but left the paper the following year to travel to Hamburg with Little Richard whose autobiography he was ghosting. In the German city, he met and befriended The Beatles – who called him "Crispy Hutch" – and when he rejoined the NME in 1962 he was assigned to travel with them on all their tours. Having befriended Elvis Presley's manager, Colonel Tom Parker, and then Presley himself, it was Hutchins who set up a party in Presley's Los Angeles home for the Beatles to meet Presley on Friday 27 August 1965.

== Public relations ==
In 1966, Hutchins left the NME where he was news editor to form his own PR company. His first client (on 26 December 1966 for the sum of £25-a-week) was Tom Jones who he represented for the next ten years. It was Hutchins who persuaded Jones's manager Gordon Mills to change the singer's image. Under Hutchins's tutelage, Jones's marriage was played down, his sexuality played up and his availability to the press limited. Since Mills also managed Engelbert Humperdinck and Gilbert O'Sullivan, Hutchins became their PR as well. Other clients included the Bee Gees, Status Quo, the Moody Blues, Procol Harum and Eric Clapton. For a while he also worked for Harold Wilson who became his friend. Indeed, it was Hutchins's friendship with the prime minister that saved a difficult situation. In April 1974, Tom Jones was kept a virtual prisoner in his suite at the Caracas Hilton in Venezuela during an ill-judged tour and a cable from Hutchins to Wilson helped to ease the wheels of the party's freedom plus a bribe of $12,000.

== Journalism ==
In 1976, after ten years with Management Agency & Music (MAM) or The Family as Mills's stable of artists was known, Hutchins closed his PR company to return to journalism. On 16 April 1977, the first of a series of ten articles about The Family was published in the Daily Mirror. On 19 April, Gordon Mills's lawyer, Michael Balin, tried to take out an injunction to prevent the stories but the Mirror took the case to the High Court where three judges, including Master of the Rolls Lord Denning, found in the newspaper's favour. Gordon Mills flew into Heathrow from Los Angeles threatening to punch Hutchins. The series added 180,000 to the Mirror circulation.

In May 1981, Hutchins began the gossip column, Chris Hutchins Confidential in the Sunday Mirror. The column subsequently moved to the Daily Express in 1986 and the following year to Today when Rupert Murdoch bought the newspaper. In 1997, Confidential returned to the Sunday Mirror after then editor Bridget Rowe saw Hutchins pontificating on a subject on Sky News. The column was lastly revived in Punch, under the editorship of James Steen – who had been one of Hutchins's foot soldiers on Today – after Garth Gibbs, the former gossip columnist for the Daily Mirror left the magazine.

== Biographies ==
After breaking the story of the Duchess of York's affair with the Texan oil billionaire Oscar Wyatt's son Steve, Hutchins wrote his first book Fergie Confidential. That was followed by Diana on the Edge, Elvis Meets the Beatles, Athina the Last Onassis, Goldsmith: Money, Women & Power and his autobiography Mr Confidential. Mark Bolland, the former deputy private secretary to The Prince of Wales, reviewed the book for British Journalism Review and wrote:

"Chris Hutchins seems to have seen and done it all. As a young reporter he was censured by the NUJ for failing to be deferential enough to Prince Philip. He was there when Elvis met the Beatles. He helped turn Tom Jones into a superstar. He got drunk with Harold Wilson. And he helped Richard Branson take on British Airways."

Hutchins was criticised by many in showbusiness for breaking confidences. Frank Sinatra was once quoted as saying, "Your secrets are safe with this guy Hutchins, it's the people he tells who are indiscreet."

Later he turned his attention to Russians Roman Abramovich and Vladimir Putin producing Abramovich: The Billionaire from Nowhere (with Dominic Midgley) and Putin A Biography. He returned to the British royal family in 2013 with Harry The People’s Prince. As a publisher, Hutchins was responsible for The Who Before The Who, the memoirs of the group’s original drummer, Doug Sandom.

Hutchins died on 27 June 2024, aged 83.

== Published works ==
- Sarah's Story (with Peter Thompson). London: SmithGryphon. 1992. pp. 272. ISBN 1-85685-0-293.
- Diana's Nightmare: The Family (with Peter Thompson). London: Simon & Schuster. 1993. p. 364. ISBN 0-671-71341-8.
- Elvis Meets The Beatles (with Peter Thompson). London: SmithGryphon. 1994. p. 248. ISBN 1-85685-083-8.
- Diana on the Edge: Inside The Mind of the Princess of Wales (with Dominic Midgley). London: SmithGryphon. 1996. p. 216. ISBN 1-85685-122-2.
- Athina: The Last Onassis. London: SmithGryphon. 1996. p. 272. ISBN 978-1-856851084.
- Goldsmith: Money, Women and Power (with Dominic Midgley). Edinburgh: Mainstream. 1998. p. 224. ISBN 1-84018-093-5.
- Abramovich: The Billionaire from Nowhere (with Dominic Midgley). London: HarperCollins. 2004. p. 337.
- Mr Confidential. London: John Blake. 2005. p. 288. ISBN 978-1844541461.
- Putin: A Biography. London: Matador. 2012. p. 312. ISBN 978-1780881140.
- Harry: The People's Prince. London: The Robson Press. 2013. p. 288. ISBN 978-1849545471.
