= Panko or Votes for Women =

Card game

- The Great Card Game; Suffragists v. Anti-Suffragists
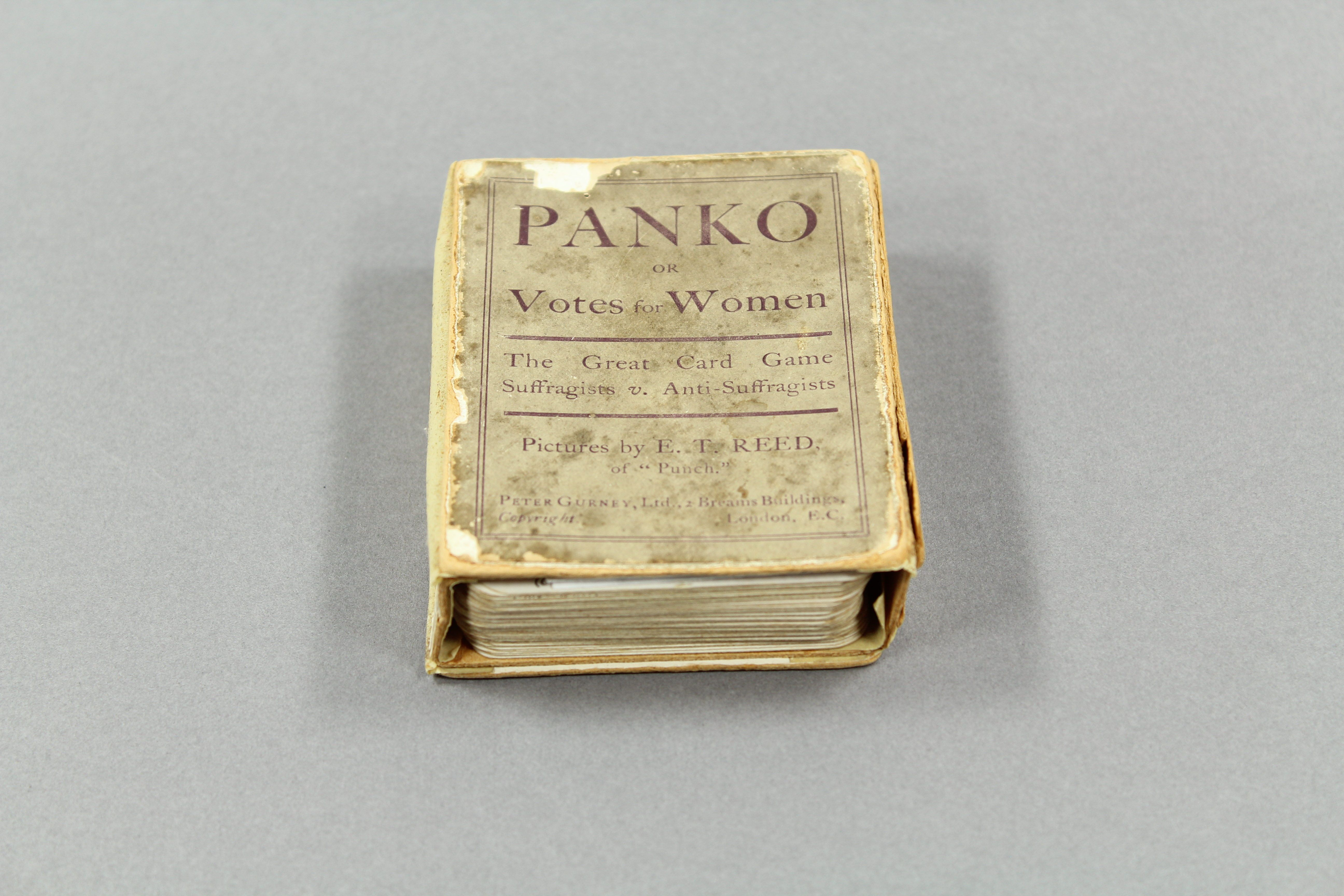
- Designer: Edward Tennyson Reed
- Publisher: Peter Gurney
- Release date: 1909

Panko or Votes for Women is a card game about the women's suffrage movement.

== Game play ==
The game "pits opponents and supporters of suffrage against each other in a game similar to rummy." The game contains forty-eight cards, divided into eight different categories of six cards each.

== Background ==
The game was published and manufactured by Peter Gurney in 1909 in London, and was released just ahead of Christmas. A similar game, Holloway or Votes for Women, which included questions about suffrage activists, and illustrated with their photographs, had been released in 1907.

The game was named after Emmeline Pankhurst, an English suffragette and leader of women's suffrage in the United Kingdom. The cards were designed by Edward Tennyson Reed, an English political cartoonist and illustrator well known for his work in the magazine Punch. The cards featured images of prominent figures of the women's suffrage movement in the United Kingdom.

The game was widely advertised and distributed by the Women's Social and Political Union, along with private merchants. Packs of the game originally sold for two shillings.

The "translation of the women's suffrage movement into card games, and also board games, helped bring the message of the cause into domestic circles where more overt forms of propaganda might not have been welcomed."

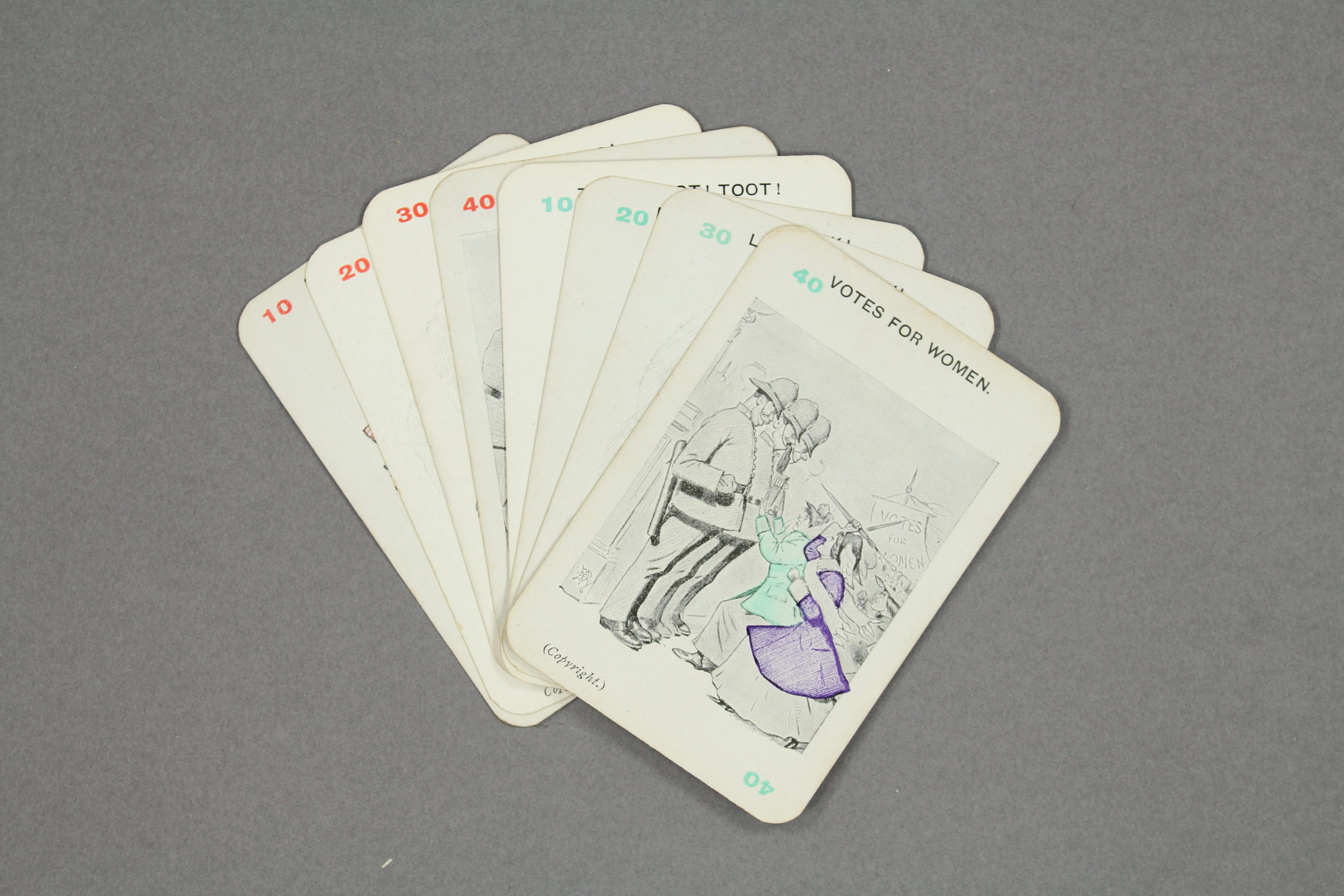
Various Panko cards

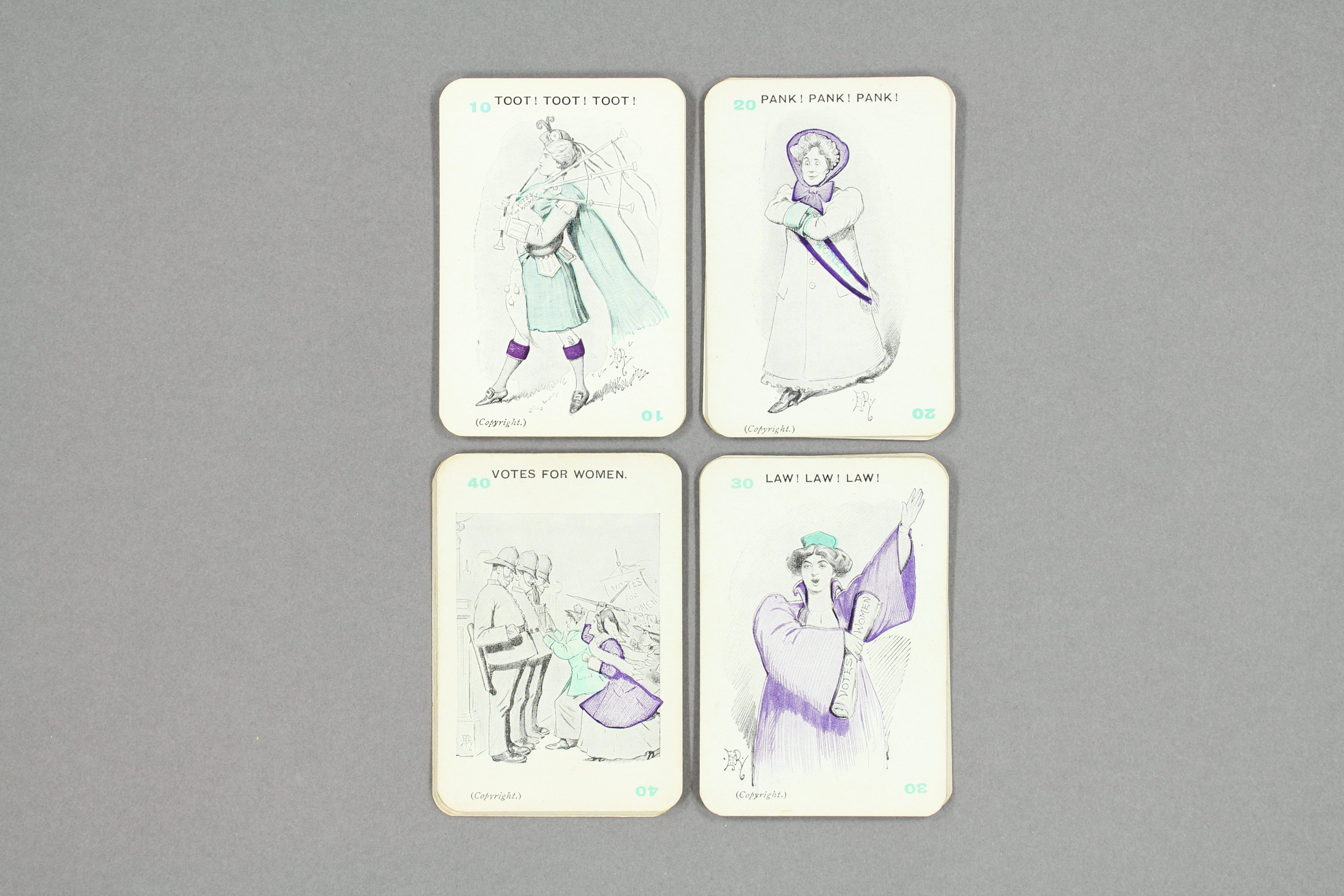
More panko cards

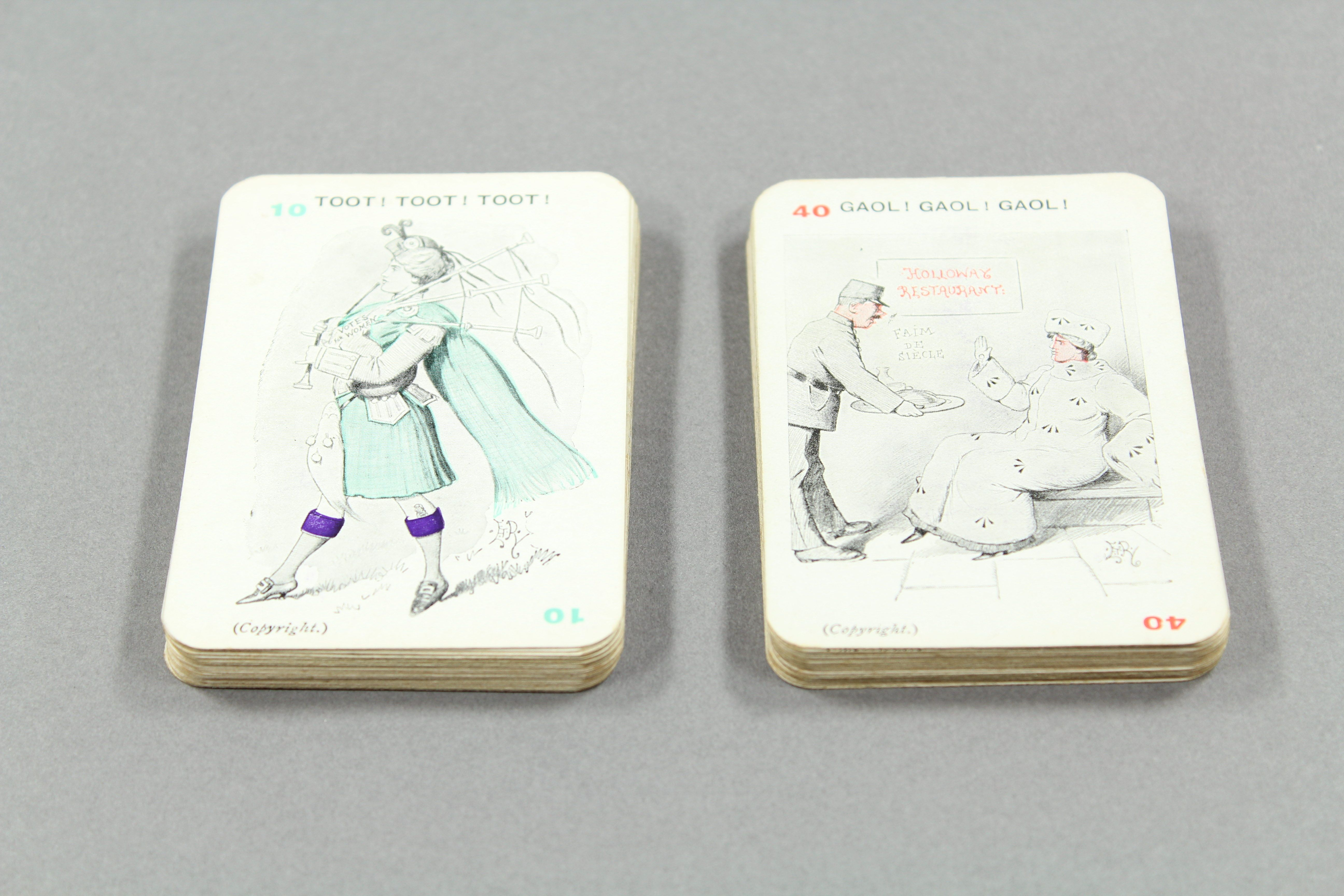
Gaol and Toot

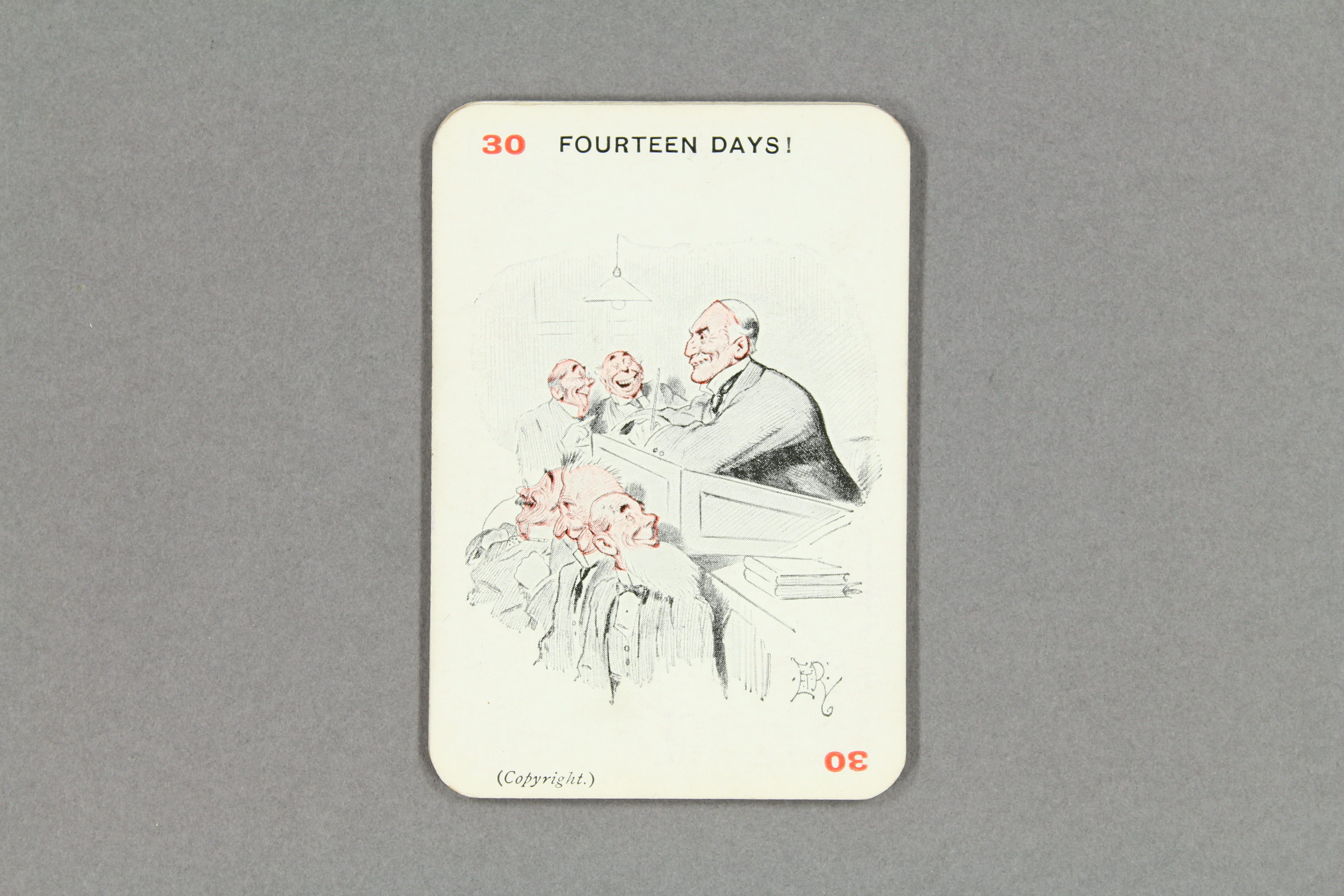
Fourteen days

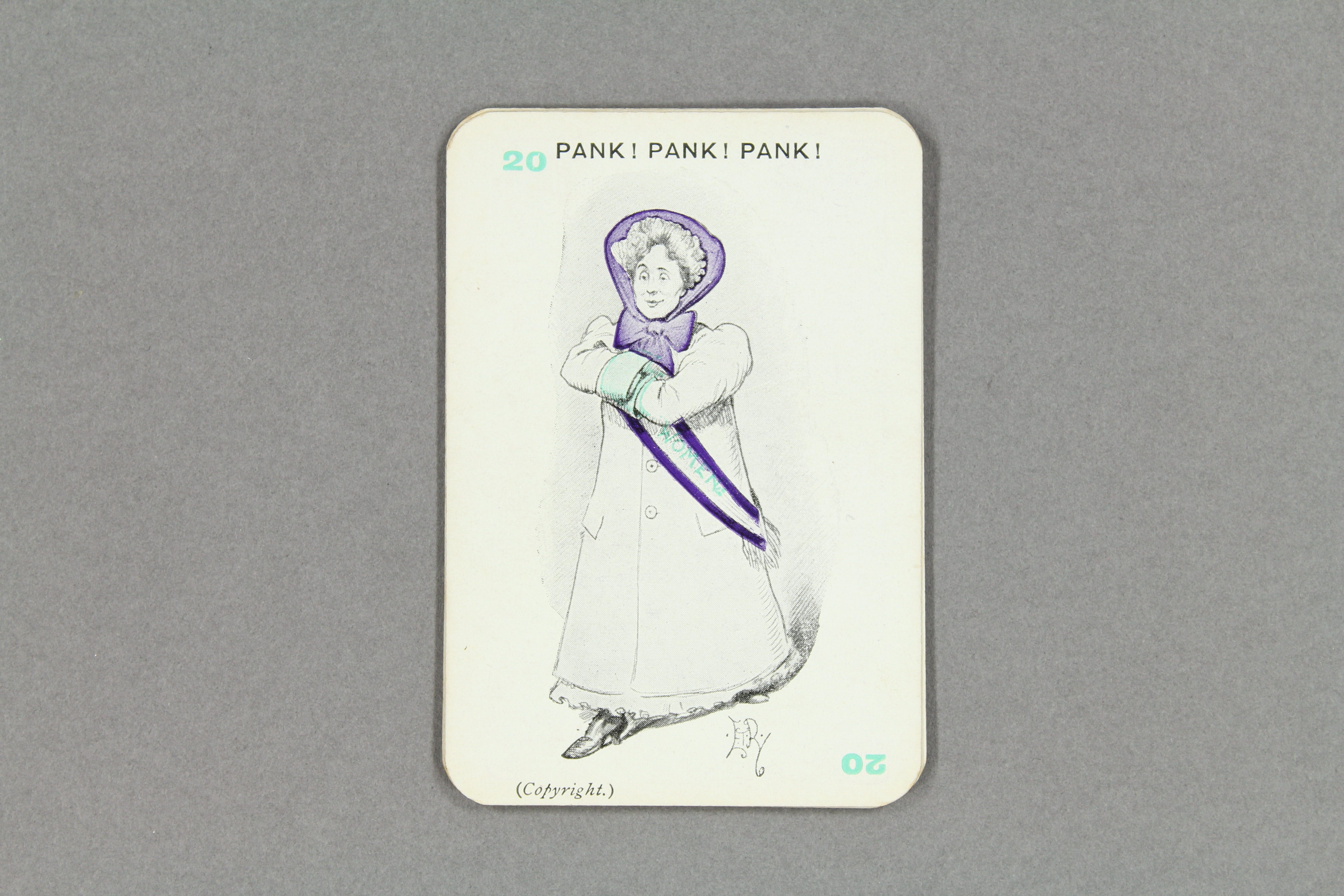
Pank

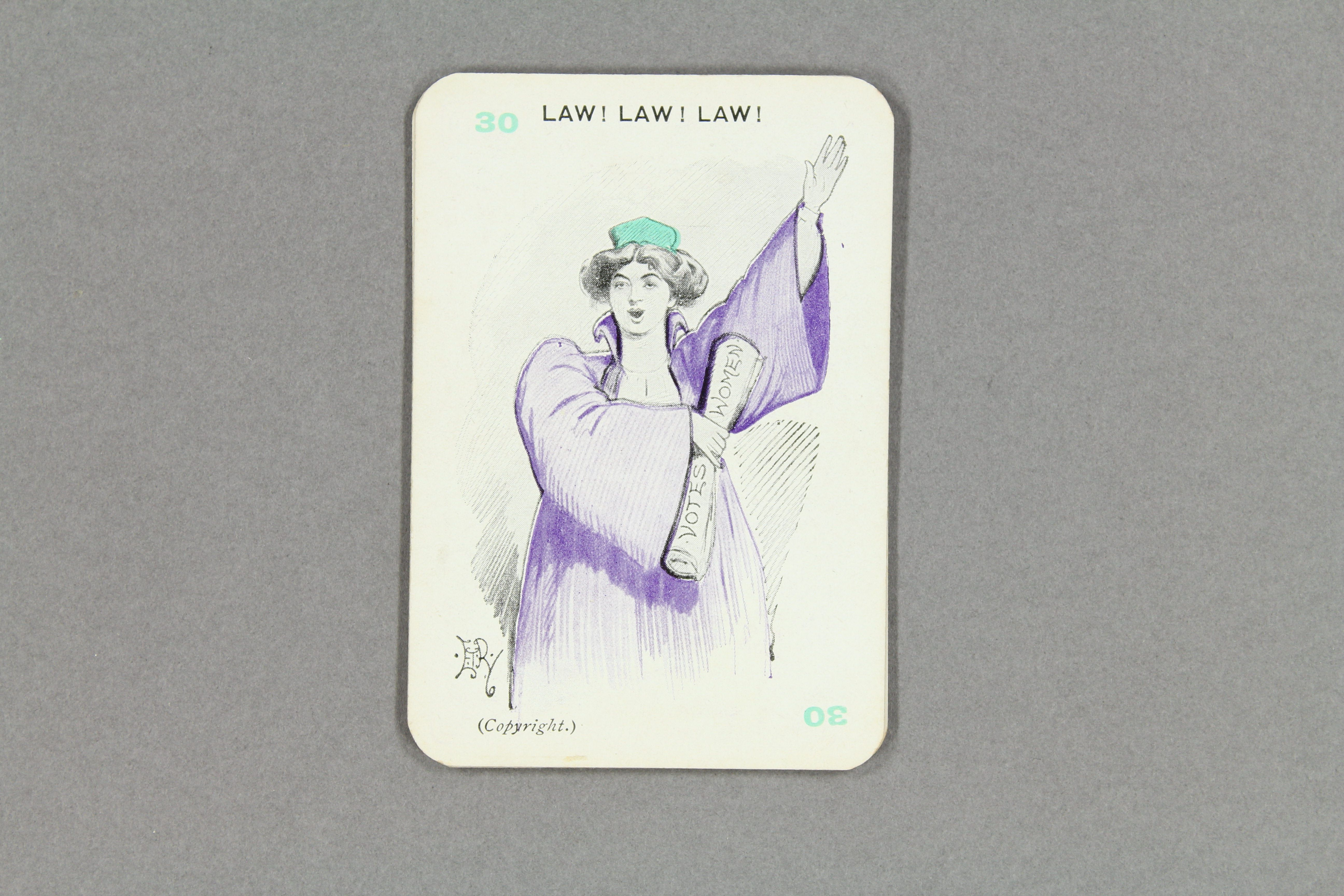
Law

== See also ==
- Pank-a-Squith
