= James Steen (journalist) =

British journalist and author

James Steen is a British journalist and author and former penultimate editor of Punch.

== Background ==
James Edward Steen is the son of the photographer David Steen and the journalist Shirley Flack.

- Rice-Davies, Mandy; Flack, Shirley (1980). Mandy. London: Michael Joseph. ISBN 0718119746 – via archive.org.
- Reger, Janet; Flack, Shirley (1991). Janet Reger: Her Story. London: Chapmans Publishers. ISBN 978-1-85592-534-2.

== Career ==
Steen worked on Today and freelanced for most of the other nationals including the Daily Mail, The Sunday Times and Sunday Express when Eve Pollard was the editor. He became the editor of Punch in 1997 following the departure of Paul Spike. Although the magazine never gained a large circulation, under Steen's editorship it became a powerful voice puncturing the pomposity of the powerful and covered stories that the mainstream media shied away from. An advertising campaign emphasised the new approach with the slogan: "If we catch you at it, you're in it." It helped to uncover the true story behind the loan that led to the first sacking from the cabinet of Peter Mandelson in December 1998. It was also at the vanguard of the investigation into the murder of the TV presenter Jill Dando. Punch also revealed that high-street banks routinely abandoned confidential information inside bin-bags deposited on the street, rather than shredding it. "How your secrets are left on the street", blazed the cover line, and a seven-page report detailed exactly what was found in bags left outside a handful of London banks.

Among the journalists who worked on the magazine during Steen's editorship were Jerry Hayes who covered politics, Dominic Midgley who was the deputy editor, John McVicar who wrote about crime, Nick Foulkes (luxury goods), Jono Coleman (restaurant critic), George Best (football), James Hipwell and Anil Bhoyrul (finance) after they left the Daily Mirror.

Steen left Punch in 2001 and became co-editor (with Midgley) of the Scurra gossip column on the Daily Mirror. The paper's then editor and now television presenter Piers Morgan called Steen "the world's most mischievous journalist". The column was dropped when Morgan was sacked in 2004.

Steen turned his hand to ghosting the autobiographies of celebrity chefs beginning with the enfant terrible of cookery Marco Pierre White and White Slave (entitled The Devil In The Kitchen in North America and in the paperback version) was published in 2006. The three-starred chef admitted that Steen had written all of the book "but I did lots and lots of interviews with him and it's the most wonderful form of counselling ever, free of charge, and I was being paid for it." Steen followed up by working with Raymond Blanc and Keith Floyd. In November 2008, Steen won the Association of Publishing Agencies' Effectiveness Awards Journalist of the Year gong for his writing on Waitrose Food Illustrated. His work for the John Brown-published magazine included an interview with Marcus Wareing regarding his ex-boss Gordon Ramsay, which was picked up by a number of national newspapers. The judges said:

"Steen grabs your attention from the very first word. You feel like you're getting an exclusive look at his subject and come away with a real insight into what they're really like."

== Books ==
- Born For The Job: A Collection Of Amusingly Apt Names (with Dominic Midgley) (London: Michael O'Mara Books, 25 June 2004)
- White Slave The Autobiography The Godfather Of Modern Cooking (with Marco Pierre White) (London: Orion, 2006)
- The Devil In The Kitchen (with Marco Pierre White) (London: Orion, 27 May 2008)
- A Taste Of My Life (with Raymond Blanc) (London: Bantam Press, 10 October 2008)
- Stirred But Not Shaken: The Autobiography (with Keith Floyd) (London: Sidgwick & Jackson, 2 October 2009)
- Marco Made Easy: A Three-Star Chef Makes It Simple (with Marco Pierre White) (London: Weidenfeld & Nicolson, 30 September 2010)
- Kitchen Secrets (with Raymond Blanc) (London: Bloomsbury Publishing, 21 Feb 2011)
- The Kitchen Magpie (London: Icon Books, 1 May 2014)
- The Foodie (London: Icon Books, 2 July 2015)
