= Suffragetto =

Board game

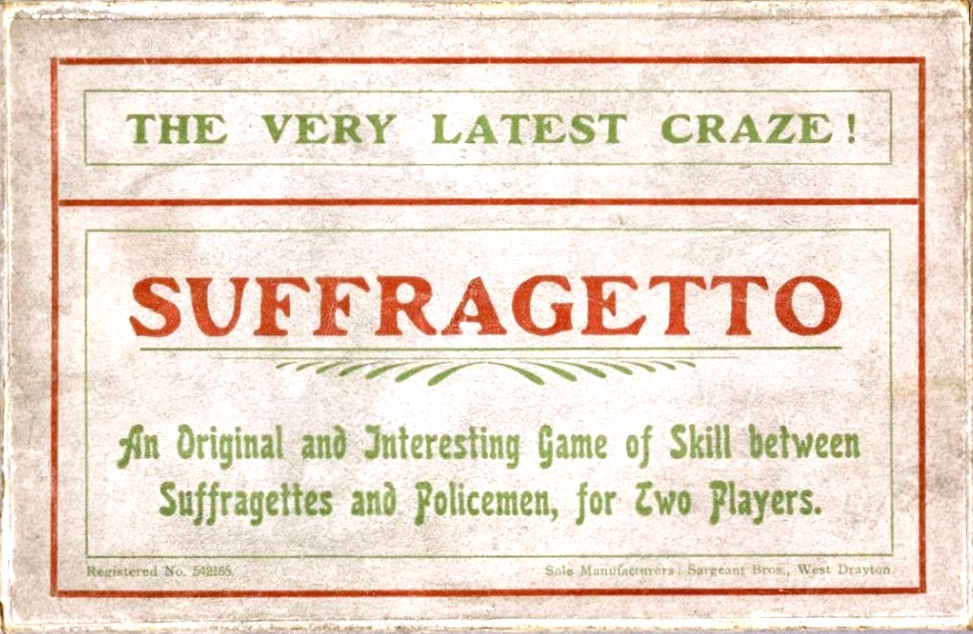
Suffragetto box

Suffragetto was a board game published in the United Kingdom around 1908 by the Women's Social and Political Union (WSPU) and manufactured by Sargeant Bros. Ltd. In modern terms, it was developed to "enact feminist ideology in a hybrid fantasy-real world environment" to support the activist strategies of the suffragettes.

== Game play ==
Suffragetto board layout

The game is a contest of occupation featuring two players around a grid board representing the streets of Edwardian London. One player plays 21 green markers as the radical suffragettes, the other player plays 21 dark blue markers as the police constables. The objective of the suffragettes is to break through police lines and enter the House of Commons, while at the same time preventing the police from entering Albert Hall. The objective of the police is to disrupt the meeting of the suffragettes by entering Albert Hall, while at the same time preventing them from entering the House of Commons.

"Arrested" suffragettes are confined to the "prison" section of the board, whereas "disabled" constables are confined to the "hospital" section. The game is won by the first player who introduces six markers into the opponent's base.

The WSPU were enthusiastic about manufacturing and selling the game, as it would allow the organisation to continue running without having to depend on donations from wealthy individuals.

== Legacy ==
Oxford's Bodleian Libraries has the only known surviving copy of the game. Suffragetto was among several children's games designed at that time around the themes of gender, resistance, and social relationships, along with the contemporaneous games Panko and Pank-a-Squith (1909). The goal of the latter was to navigate a suffragette (led by Emmeline Pankhurst) down a long path from her home to parliament, past obstacles placed by the Liberal government (led by Prime Minister H. H. Asquith).

The game of Suffragetto was demonstrated in the second episode of the first season of the 2018 BBC documentary series Further Back in Time for Dinner. and in the documentary No Man Shall Protect Us: The Hidden History of the Suffragette Bodyguards (2018).

It is possible to print and play the board game, and it can be played for free using the Java-based Vassal Engine; there was previously an online version.
