= Josephine Matley Duddle =

English painter and illustrator

Josephine Matley Duddle (1890–1981, Mosman, Sydney) was an English painter and illustrator. She was the daughter of James Duddle, a musician and college student tutor from Lancashire, and his wife Ellen. She was married in 1915 to the cartoonist and painter David Louis Ghilchik. Josephine was a student at the Manchester School of Art, where she met David, a fellow student. Her siblings were Robert, Marion, and Charles.

Josephine became noted for her postcards featuring children and fairies, most of her work being produced in the period between World War I and World War II. She belonged to the Royal Institute of Oil Painters and the Society of Women Artists. Her painted landscapes and portraits were usually signed 'Josephine Ghilchik'. She wrote and illustrated two books - "One, Two, Buckle My Shoe" (1916) and "Kittles of Toy Town" (London; New York: R. Tuck & Sons).

Josephine's daughter, Sybil, born 15 November 1920, became an opera singer with the D'Oyly Carte Opera Company. She married Irish tenor, Terence O'Donoghue, a fellow member of the opera company, and they settled in Sydney, Australia with their three children in 1956, Terence joining the J. C. Williamson company. Terence died in 1984 in Sydney.

In 1980 Josephine settled in Sydney, to be with her daughter. She died the following year.
