= Pank-a-Squith =

Board game about the suffragette movement

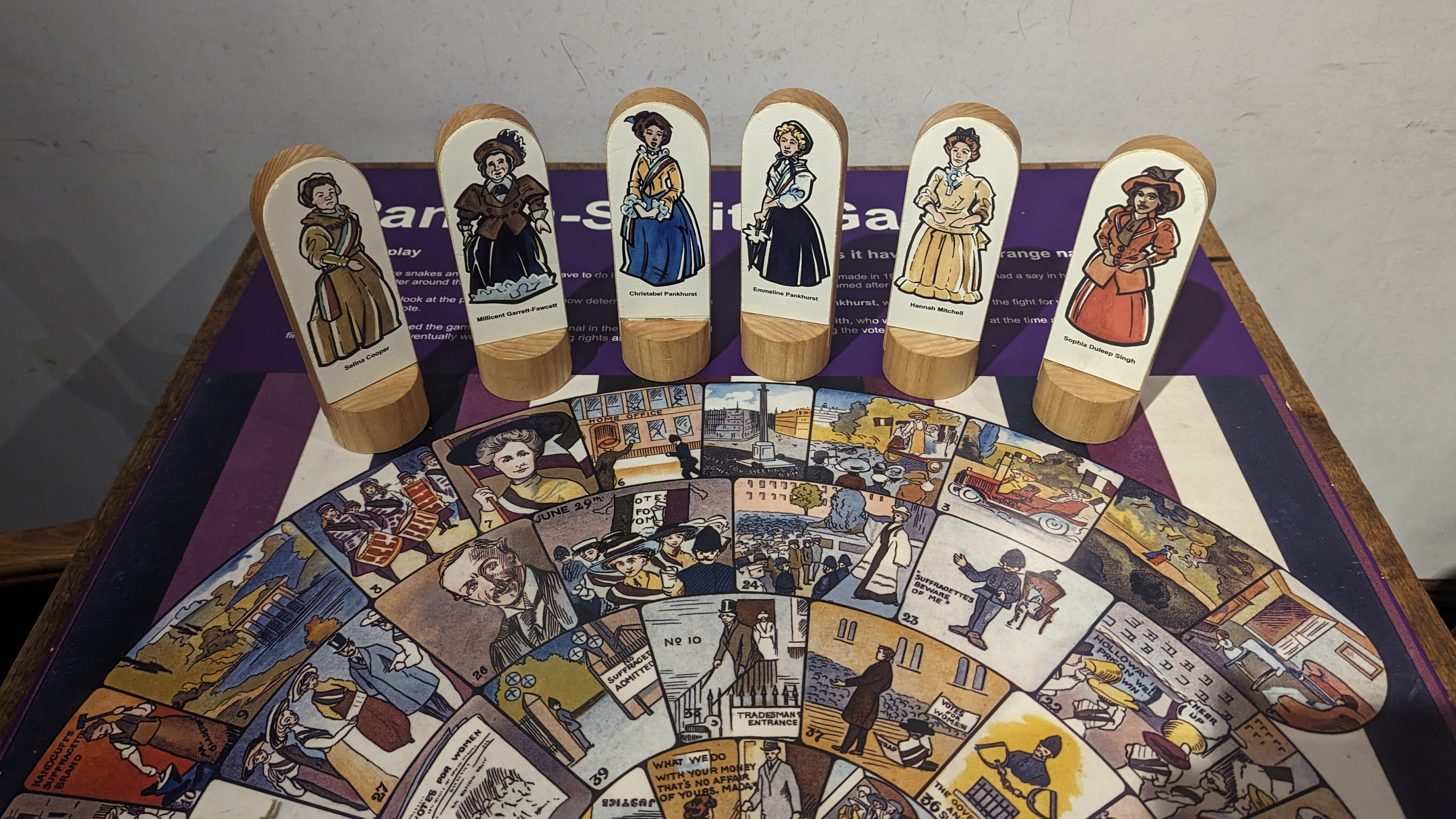
Pank-a-Squith game at the People's History Museum in Manchester featuring Millicent Fawcett, Emmeline Pankhurst and Christabel Pankhurst

Pank-a-Squith was a political board game about the suffragette movement created around 1909. It was created for the British Women's Social and Political Union as a way to generate funds and help spread women's suffrage ideologies.

== History ==
Pank-a-Squith was created for the British Women's Social and Political Union (WSPU) and produced by a German company around 1909. It was named after two important figures in the British suffrage movement: the suffragette leader Emmeline Pankhurst and British Prime Minister and opponent of women's suffrage, H. H. Asquith. Its name can be read as "Pankhurst vs Asquith," since both individuals were opponents in their views on women's suffrage. Starting in 1909, the game was sold in the WSPU shops in Britain and was used as a way to generate funds for the suffragette movement. Pank-a-Squith was also first advertised in 1909 in the newspaper, Votes for Women.

According to the WSPU in their own advertisement, the game was sold as a way to "popularise the cause and the colours". During the women's suffrage movement in Great Britain, games and toys were often sold to help spread supporters' ideologies as well as to financially support the movement through their sales. Similar political games were sold throughout the course of the WSPU in their shops, including the card games Suffragette (ca. 1907), Panko (ca. 1909), and Holloway (ca. 1908), and board games like Suffragetto (ca. 1907–8) and Suffragettes In and Out of Prison (n.d.).

== Description ==
The game is played with 2-6 players and includes a game board, instructions, and six game tokens shaped as suffragettes. Each suffragette game piece holds a rolled petition and wears a sash of suffragette colors, including green, white, and purple. The game board contains a spiral of squares with various illustrations.

Played similarly to snakes and ladders, players roll the dice to move their pieces along the board's tiles. The goal is to move from the outermost square, which represents home, to the end point at the center, which depicts the Houses of Parliament.

The illustrations on the game board depict various suffragette events and difficulties. On the sixth square, there is a depiction of women throwing rocks at the British Home Office windows. On the twenty-fifth square, Emmeline Pankhurst is shown being arrested, as she was after striking a police officer on June 29, 1909. The forty-third square shows a woman refusing to eat, which happened during hunger strikes. The sixteenth square also states, "Any player landing on this space must send a penny to Suffragette Funds."

== See also ==
- Women's suffrage
- Women's suffrage in the United Kingdom
- Women's Social and Political Union
- Suffragetto Board Game
