= Anil Bhoyrul =

British business journalist

- Born: May 1966 (age 59); Mauritius
- Occupation: Business journalist
- Years active: 1993-current
- Known for: Insider trading
- Criminal charges: Conspiracy to breach the Financial Services Act 1986
- Criminal penalty: 180 hours of community service

Anil Bhoyrul (born Mauritius, May 1966) is a British business journalist who was convicted of breaching the Financial Services Act 1986 in the 'City Slickers' share tipping scandal of 1999–2000. After writing for the Sunday Express, he joined Arabian Business in Dubai, and is now CEO of JES Media.

== Early life ==
He was born in Mauritius and moved to the UK when he was 14. He graduated in Civil Engineering in 1988.

== BusinessAge and Sunday Business ==
Bhoyrul started working in civil engineering but soon switched to journalism. In 1993 he joined BusinessAge magazine under its editor and owner Tom Rubython, becoming deputy editor the following year. Rubython sold the title to VNU in 1995; according to PR Week "The legend of the pre-VNU BusinessAge was that it went down in a welter of writs". In April 1996 Rubython launched the Sunday Business with Bhoyrul as editor, but despite strong initial sales and investment by Owen Oyston, the Sunday Business struggled financially and failed within a year; the Barclay brothers finalised a deal to buy it from the receivers in August 1997.

Meanwhile, BusinessAge had struggled under VNU and was closed in June 1996. Bhoyrul saw that he did not fit in the plans of the new regime at the Sunday Business and with a consortium of investors led by Oyston bought BusinessAge back from VNU. BusinessAge relaunched in June 1997 with Bhoyrul as editor promising "to take the title back to its glossy, controversial and scandalous best. We’ll probably ruin a few careers along the way, but only if they deserve it". Oyston sold his media interests after he was convicted of raping a teenager in 1997. Chris Butt took over as editor in 1998, when Oyston sold to Priory Publishing.

== City Slickers scandal ==
Bhoyrul and BusinessAge colleague James Hipwell then joined the Daily Mirror under editor Piers Morgan. Between incidents such as Bhoyrul getting caught stealing a penguin from London Zoo, they wrote a share-tipping column called "City Slickers". They bought shares before tipping them in the newspaper, in 44 separate incidents between 1 August 1999 and 29 February 2000. Bhoyrul pleaded guilty to the conspiracy on 11 August 2005. He was convicted on charges of conspiracy to breach the Financial Services Act 1986 and sentenced to 180 hours of community service. Hipwell denied the charges along with private investor Terry Shepherd, and they were sentenced to six months and three months in prison respectively.

== Punch, Express and ITP ==
After they were sacked from the Daily Mirror in 2000, Mohamed Al-Fayed gave Bhoyrul and Hipwell a column in Punch and £100,000 to turn into £1 million within 12 months. They wrote a book "for Mirror readers, not your sophisticated types" entitled Make a Million in Twelve Months; We did! but at the time of its launch, five months into the challenge, they had lost 30% of the money. In July 2000 he was planning to write a book on the City Slickers story called A Tip Too Far, and claimed that he had had enough of newspapers and wanted to go back to Mauritius to run a bar on a beach.

However soon Bhoyrul joined Richard Desmond's Express group, where he wrote articles under the byline Frank Bailey. He wrote 26 negative stories about Conrad Black in the Sunday Express between September 2001 and May 2003, including one questioning Black's finances that the newspaper subsequently admitted was false. In May 2003 he wrote to Piers Morgan apologising for articles he had written under various pseudonyms in the Sunday Express :"Nothing would make me happier than not having to write all this stuff, but then nobody else pays me £6k a month...the thinking behind that column comes as you can guess from people above me".

In 2004 he moved to Dubai to become editor of Arabian Business, a weekly English-language magazine published by ITP Media Group. He left the magazine suddenly in 2005 but stayed with ITP and became editor-in-chief. He left in June 2020, shortly after Arabian Business introduced a paywall. As of March 2021 he is CEO of JES Media in Dubai.

== Personal life ==
Bhoyrul is married to Branka, a Slovenian photographer. They have three children - Joe, Evita and Savannah. In 2018, worried that his children were becoming too spoilt and materialistic in Dubai, he got them to each throw a dart at a world map and as a result sent them to live in La Paz, Bolivia for two years. He is a fan of Arsenal F.C.
