= David Steen (photographer) =

British photographer

- Born: 16 February 1936; London, England
- Died: 16 November 2015 (aged 79)
- Occupation: Photographer
- Years active: 1953–2015

David Steen (16 February 1936 – 16 November 2015) was a British photographer. His subjects included show business and sports stars, and politicians.

== Life and work ==
Steen was born in London, one of two children (his sister Sheila was born in 1932). Much of his childhood was spent in the air-raid shelters of London and, also as a result of dyslexia, he was poorly schooled.

Steen recalls the beginning of his career:

One day a woman called Paddy Brosnan went to Smithfield to buy some meat. My dad asked Paddy if there was a job for me. She was the secretary to Tom Hopkinson, the editor of Picture Post. She said I could work for her as an office boy. On 1 April 1951, at the age of 15, I started work. Picture Post carried staff writers and about eight staff photographers. I walked around the office delivering post and doing odd errands for the staff. One day I was in the photographers' rest room, where they had their lockers, when the picture editor Harry Deverson, came in. He said to one photographer, 'Come and talk to me about a job in Switzerland,' and to another photographer, 'Talk to me about a job in Tokyo'. I had rarely left Clerkenwell, certainly never been abroad. My ears started buzzing, and it was at that precise moment I decided that this photography game was for me. I soon started assisting the photographers.

One of those photographers, Bert Hardy, took Steen under his wing. Hardy taught him not just about taking photos but also the importance of punctuality, being smart, wearing clean shoes and, above all, the love of the job. Between the ages of 15 and 18, when Steen's friends were going out to pubs and parties, he was out and about, with a borrowed camera taking pictures around London by day and by night.

On sunny days mothers would leave their babies in prams outside their homes and, to earn extra money, Steen would borrow a camera, photograph the babies, and have the pictures printed at a chemist shop. He would pay a shilling a print and then knock at the door of the mother and sell her a photo of her baby for two shillings.

At the age of 17, he was doing small assignments, and at 18 he undertook his first foreign assignment, travelling to Paris to photograph the film director Otto Preminger. "I stayed at the Georges VI hotel, dined at Maxim's, and went to the Crazy Horse nightclub. This was the beginning of a great adventure that would last for decades."

In June 1954, Steen began his National Service, spending the first few months in Germany as an Army photographer. He was then despatched to Egypt where he was promoted to the rank of sergeant. "My mum and dad were very proud." From his base in Ismialia, Egypt, he was sent by the War Office to cover many stories in the Middle East; Cyprus, Libya, Aden and Somalia. By the time he was demobbed (in June 1956) Steen had accomplished an immense amount of travel and photography.

He returned to Picture Post, but a year later the magazine ceased publication. Soon afterwards, he was offered a job as a photographer on Britain's first newspaper for women, Women's Sunday Mirror. The publication was founded by Hugh Cudlipp, who gave Steen an assignment to photograph a woman delivering her own baby under hypnosis.

The pictures were amazing; the mother and her husband and me with a Rolleiflex in a small bedroom in north London. I entered a sequence of nine photos in the Encyclopædia Britannica Press Photographs of the Year Awards. I won first prize. I was 21, the youngest photographer to win.

He joined the Daily Mail as a feature photographer during 1959–1960 before going freelance. He began to work for Queen magazine in 1962, and soon afterwards such publications as The Sunday Times, Daily Telegraph and Nova.

Steen's website biography describes him as having been "trained on the maxim 'every picture tells a story'". He focused on photographing film stars, actors, criminals, politicians, prime ministers and many men, women and children going about their everyday lives.

His book, Heroes and Villains (Genesis Publications, 2005), contains 100 photographs of famous and infamous men who were photographed by Steen over the years and was also the subject of an exhibition. Lucy Hughes-Hallett wrote for The Spectator about the book:

This isn't a pantheon of heroes, but it is a celebration of manly beauty [although Steen proves] that you don't need to be a beauty to make a beautiful picture. But it is also, to anyone who was alive in Britain in 1963, intensely evocative of that lost world. Steen is a pro – technically accomplished and unpretentious. There aren't really any heroes in this book: Steen is palpably too perceptive and level-headed for hero-worship. But there are 100 fine photographs, intensely redolent of the period that produced them, and still looking good some 40 years on.

Steen was the father of the author and journalist James Steen. David Steen died on 16 November 2015, aged 79.

== Publications ==
=== Publications by Stein ===
- Heroes + Villains. Guildford, England: Genesis Publications, 2005. ISBN 978-0904351934.

=== Publications with others ===
- "Rolling Stones": Street Fighting Years
- Twiggy: A Life in Photographs
- Sensual Beauty
- The 60s in Queen
- For God's Sake Care
- Ronnie Biggs: Odd Man Out – The Last Straw
- Mandy
