= D. L. Ghilchik =

British illustrator (1892–1972)

David Louis Ghilchik (7 April 1892 – 24 November 1972), was a Romanian-British painter, and cartoonist for Punch Magazine and the Daily Sketch. His surname is sometimes wrongly given as 'Ghilchip' and 'Ghilchie'.

He was born in Botoșani, Romania, the son of Abraham Josef Ghilchik, who traded in lace and linen, and his wife Sali. The family settled in Salford, England, in 1920, where Ghilchik enrolled at the Manchester School of Art and studied under Adolphe Valette from 1907 to 1915. At the School he met fellow student Josephine Matley Duddle (1890–1981), marrying her in Chelsea in the third quarter of 1915. Their daughter Sybil became an opera singer with the D'Oyly Carte Opera Company. Ghilchik continued his studies at the Slade School of Fine Art under Henry Tonks and Ambrose McEvoy

During World War I, Ghilchik served as a truck driver on the Italian front. He took part in the Art competitions at the 1928 Summer Olympics and 1932 Summer Olympics, submitting works in the mixed painting, drawing and watercolour categories. He also exhibited his oil paintings widely, notably at the Royal Academy, the New English Art Club and the Royal Society of Portrait Painters.

Ghilchik died in Poplar, London, on 24 November 1972. Afterwards, his wife emigrated to Australia at age 80, and died in Mosman, Sydney, the following year.
