= Edward Tennyson Reed =

English political cartoonist and illustrator

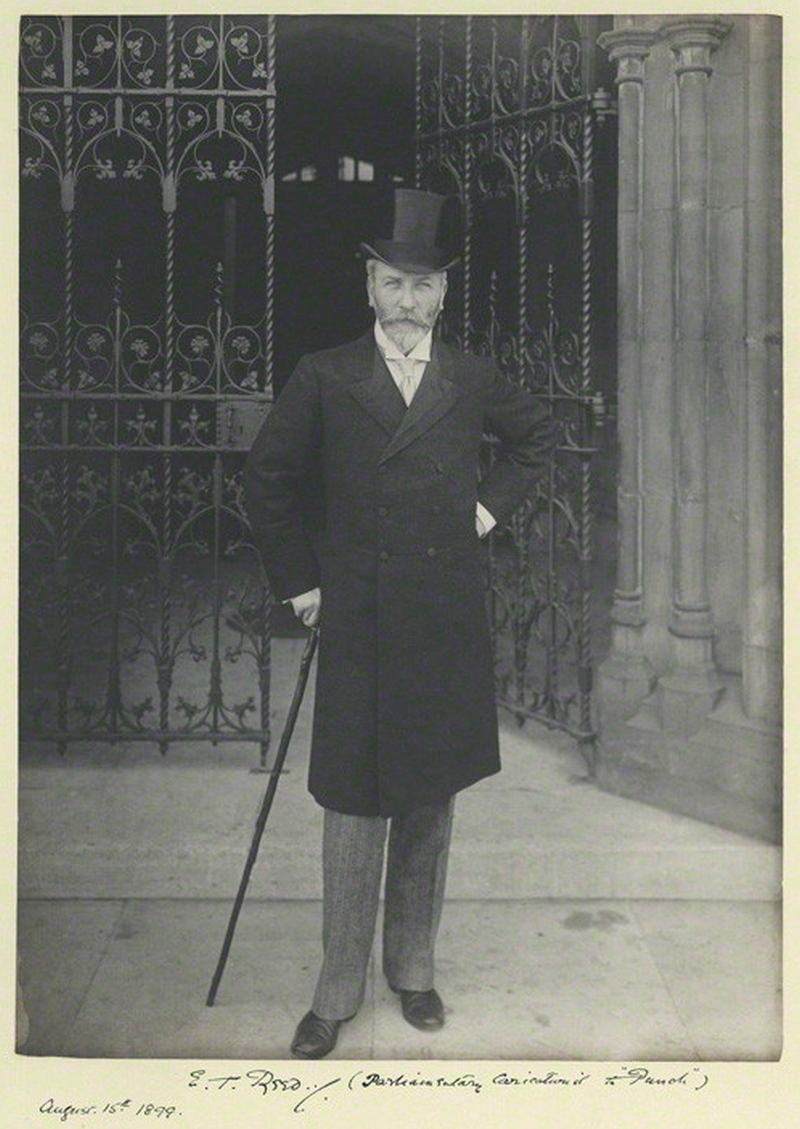
E T Reed by Sir John Benjamin Stone, 1899

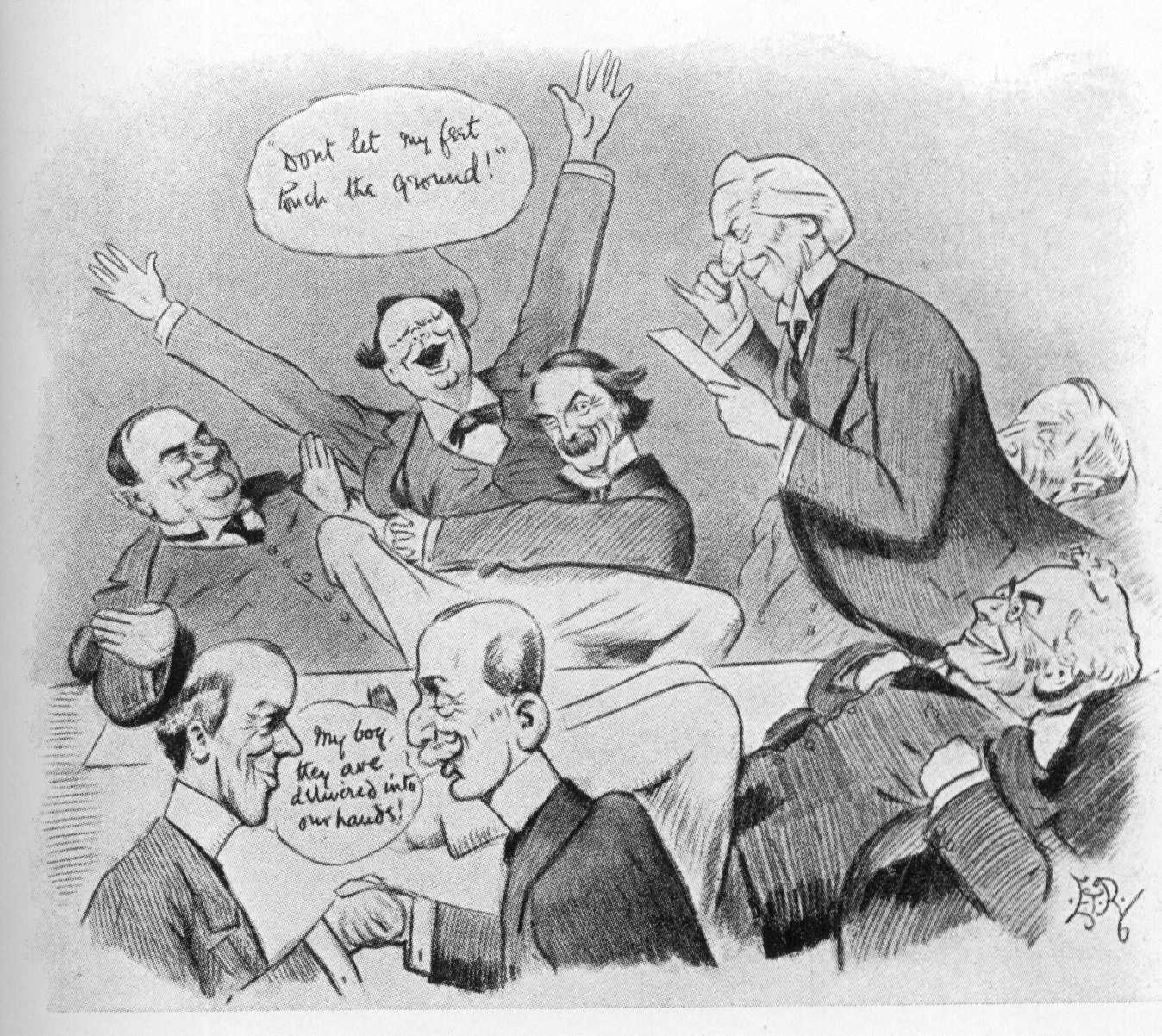
Meeting of Asquith cabinet by E T Reed, Punch, 1909

Edward Tennyson Reed (1860–1933) was an English political cartoonist and illustrator, primarily known for his cartoons in Punch.

== Biography ==
Edward Tennyson Reed was born in Greenwich, London, on 27 March 1860. He was the son of Chief Naval Architect and MP for Cardiff Sir Edward James Reed and his wife Rossetta. Reed was educated at Harrow School and later studied for the Bar. However, he preferred the world of art, and trained at Calderon's Art School before attempting to make a living as a portrait painter. After little success in this area, he moved into mastering the caricatures. He began drawing for Punch in 1889.

He remained a Punch contributor until his death. In 1893, Punch first published one of his most popular cartoon series, Prehistoric Peeps, which was turned into the silent film Prehistoric Peeps in 1905. E.T. Reed succeeded Harry Furniss as the political caricaturist of Punch in 1893. His satirical portraits illustrated the 'Essence of Parliament' articles for the next eighteen years.

In 1909, the publication of Panko or Votes for Women, a game about the women's suffrage movement began with cards designed by Reed. He exhibited work at the Society of Graphic Art's first annual exhibition in 1921.

Reed died in London on 12 July 1933 after a long illness. In 1891, he married Beatrice Bullen in Wandsworth, London from which union they had a daughter and a son.

== Bibliography ==
- Reed, Edward Tennyson; Leslie, Shane (1957). Edward Tennyson Reed, 1860-1933 / a memoir compiled by Shane Leslie from an incomplete autobiography with a choice of his caricatures made by Kenneth Bird. London: Heinemann. OCLC 3340770.
