= Prehistoric Peeps =

Caveman-themed comic by E T Reed

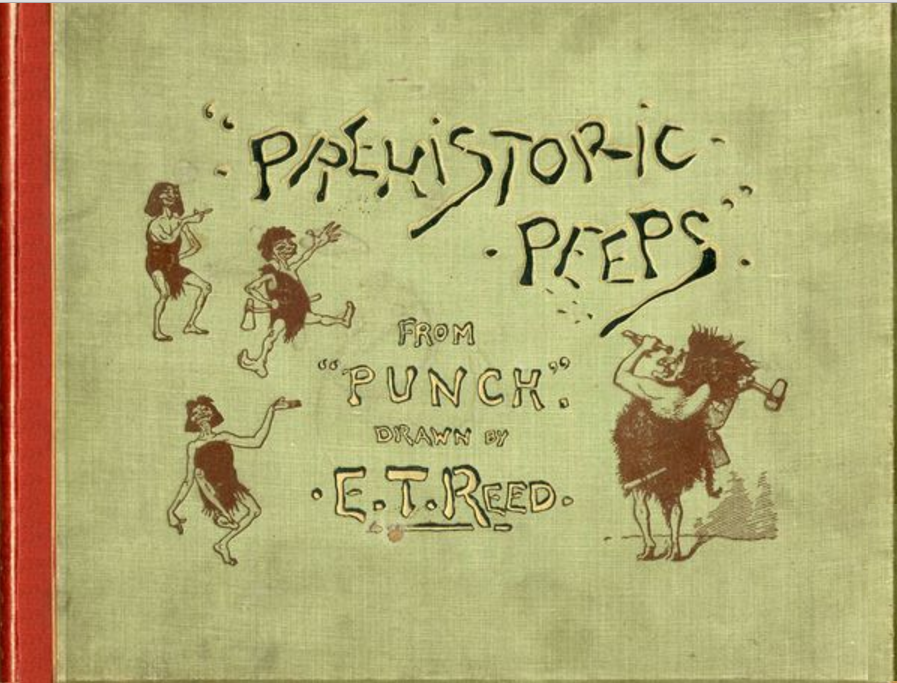
E T Reed - Prehistoric Peeps Book

Prehistoric Peeps was a cartoon series written and drawn by Edward Tennyson Reed starting in the 1890s. The cartoon appeared in Punch magazine. A collection of the cartoons was published under the title Mr. Punch's Prehistoric Peeps in 1894. The cartoon series was adapted into a series of live-action silent films, including Prehistoric Peeps (1905).
