= James Hipwell =

James Hipwell is a former Daily Mirror journalist, writer, organ donation campaigner and whistleblower who was investigated over the so-called 'City Slickers' share tipping scandal along with the paper's then editor, Piers Morgan, and several other members of its newsroom.

== Career and City Slickers scandal ==
Between 1998 and 2000, along with his colleague, Anil Bhoyrul, Hipwell worked on the Daily Mirror's financial column City Slickers, offering financial news, gossip and share tips. It became very popular, a Guardian article describing it as the "Column that turns City into showbiz". However, in February 2000 the pair were fired following allegations that they had been giving tips about companies in which they held stock.

The Department of Trade and Industry launched an investigation in 2000 but it did not conclude for several years and the trial did not come to court until October 2005. In 2002 Hipwell gave an interview to The Guardian in which he described the situation as "Kafkaesque". "We are in the invidious position of everyone knowing that we are under investigation by the DTI yet nobody, including us, knows exactly what the scope of the investigation is, who they are talking to, what they are minded to do or when, if at all, there will be an outcome," he said.

On 7 December 2005, following a six-week trial, Hipwell and Bhoyrul were convicted of conspiracy to contravene section 47(2) of the Financial Services Act 1986 contrary to section 1(1) of the Criminal Law Act 1977.

== Daily Mirror whistleblower ==
Hipwell spoke to The Independent claiming that phone hacking had been "endemic" at the Mirror during his time there under the editorship of Piers Morgan. He also alleged that phone hacking took place at some of the Mirror's sister publications. Trinity Mirror, which publishes the Daily Mirror, contested Hipwell's claims. A spokesman said: "Our position is clear...Our journalists work within the criminal law and the Press Complaints Commission code of conduct." Following Hipwell's allegations the share price of Trinity Mirror dropped 10 per cent and the company was forced to announce a review into whether its journalists had in the past hacked telephones.

In an interview for the BBC's World at One radio programme on 28 July 2011 Hipwell said there was "no doubt" that Piers Morgan knew that his journalists were using phone hacks as a method to get stories. In an interview with BBC TV's Newsnight he said that phone hacking had been an "accepted technique" to get a story at the Daily Mirror while he worked there.

On 21 December 2011 Hipwell appeared before the Leveson Inquiry and told the hearing that he had witnessed several incidents in which people's privacy was infringed while working for the Mirror, and that phone hacking appeared to be a "bog-standard journalistic tool" for gathering information at the paper. In the official report, Lord Justice Leveson said Hipwell's account of phone hacking at the Mirror was "clear, firm and convincing", while Piers Morgan's assertion that he had no knowledge of alleged phone hacking was described as "utterly unpersuasive".

== Max Clifford Associates ==
Subsequent to working for the Daily Mirror, Hipwell worked for Max Clifford at Max Clifford Associates.

== Personal life ==
In 2000 Hipwell was struck down with kidney failure and had to start having dialysis three times a week at the Middlesex Hospital in London. His brother, Tom Hipwell, donated a kidney in 2002 but the underlying kidney disease, IgA nephropathy, returned and he was back on dialysis in 2010. He has written extensively about the experience in a blog called "Life on the waiting list" in The Guardian.

In September 2010 he had a second kidney transplant, this time with his wife, film-maker and journalist Rachel Stevenson, acting as donor. She made a film about their journey to the operating table for The Guardian.

On 14 April 2011 the pair appeared on ITV morning programme Lorraine to talk about the experience and to highlight the importance of joining the NHS Organ Donor Register.

Since first being diagnosed with kidney failure, Hipwell has campaigned on related issues such as organ donation and presumed consent. In 2002 he launched National Transplant Awareness Week with health minister David Lammy. They unveiled a billboard encouraging the public to register to become organ donors. He has also written articles in support of a campaign by The Guardian to change the system of organ donation to one of presumed consent, in line with other European countries such as Spain, Austria and Belgium.

== See also ==
- News International phone hacking scandal
- Phone hacking scandal reference lists
