= Public Opinion (magazine) =

Public Opinion was a British magazine that ran from 1861 to 1951. It was a weekly "review of current thought and activity", published in London by G. Cole. An 82 reel microfilm was published by the Library of Congress in 1972.
