= Punch (magazine) =

British weekly satirical magazine, 1841–2002

Punch, or The London Charivari
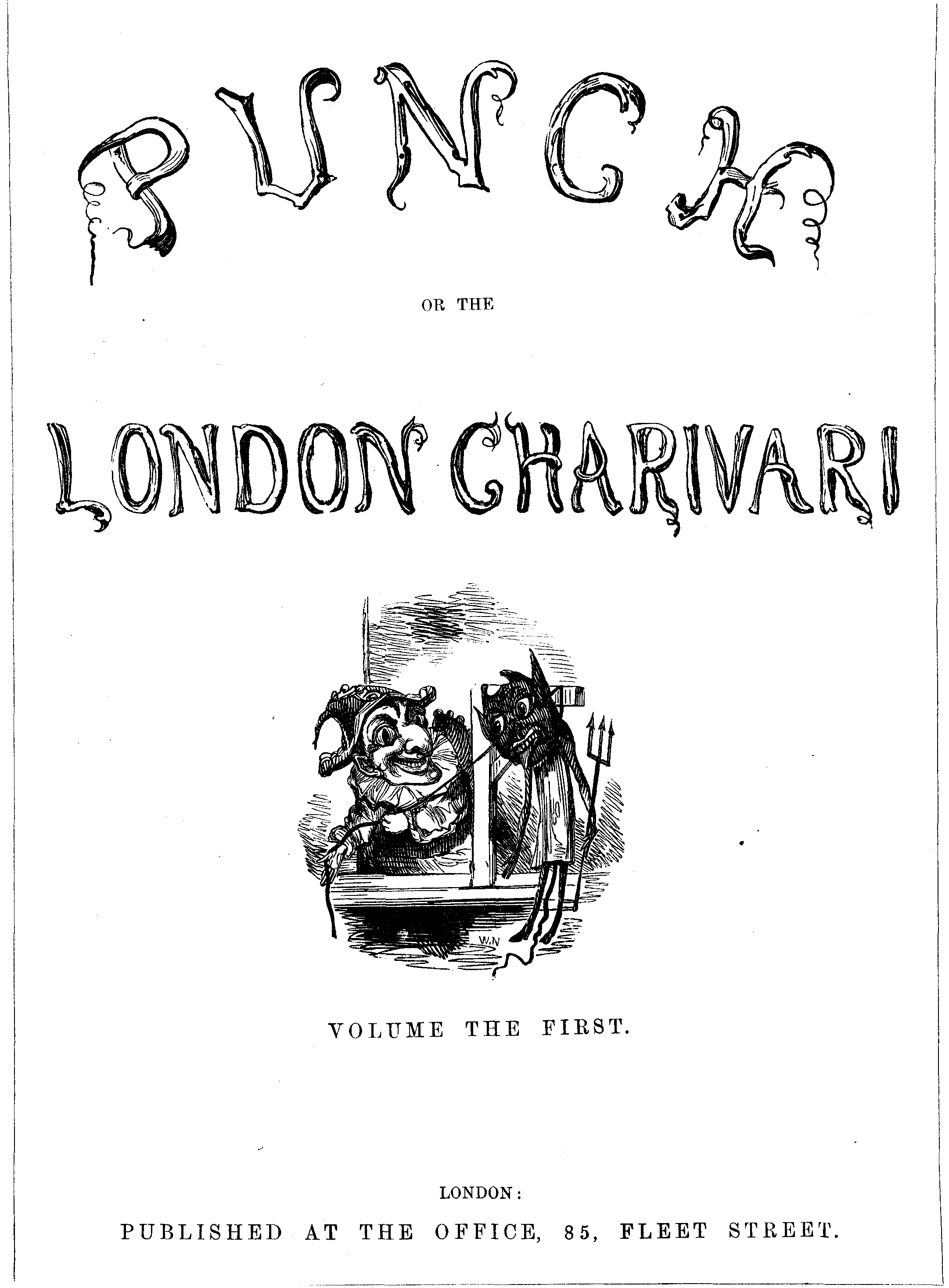
- Cover of the first Punch, or The London Charivari, depicts Punch hanging a caricatured Devil, 1841 (see gallery below for enlarged detail).
- Categories: Politics, culture, humour and satire
- Frequency: Weekly
- Founder: Henry Mayhew; Ebenezer Landells
- Founded: 1841
- First issue: 17 July 1841
- Final issue: 2002
- Country: United Kingdom
- Based in: London
- Language: English
- Website: punch.co.uk

Punch, or The London Charivari was a British weekly magazine of humour and satire established in 1841 by Henry Mayhew and wood-engraver Ebenezer Landells. Historically, it was most influential in the 1840s and 1850s, when it helped to coin the term "cartoon" in its modern sense as a humorous illustration. Artists at Punch included John Tenniel who worked for the magazine from 1850 and was its chief cartoonist from 1864 to 1901. The editors took the anarchic puppet Mr Punch, of Punch and Judy, as their mascot—the character appears in many magazine covers—with the character also an inspiration for the magazine's name.

With its satire of the contemporary, social, and political scene, Punch became a household name in Victorian Britain. Sales of 40,000 copies a week by 1850 rose above 100,000 by 1910. After the 1940s, when its circulation peaked, it went into a long decline, closing in 1992. It was revived in 1996, but closed again in 2002.

== History ==
Punch was founded on 17 July 1841 by Henry Mayhew and wood-engraver Ebenezer Landells, on an initial investment of £25 (equivalent to £2,242 in 2025). It was jointly edited by Mayhew and Mark Lemon. It was subtitled The London Charivari in homage to Charles Philipon's French satirical humour magazine Le Charivari. Reflecting their satiric and humorous intent, the two editors took for their name and masthead the anarchic glove puppet Mr. Punch, of Punch and Judy; the name also referred to a joke made early on about one of the magazine's first editors, Lemon, that "punch is nothing without lemon".

Mayhew ceased to be joint editor in 1842 and became "suggestor in chief" until he severed his connection in 1845. The magazine initially struggled for readers, except for an 1842 Almanack issue which shocked its creators by selling 90,000 copies. In December 1842, due to financial difficulties, the magazine was sold to Bradbury and Evans, both printers and publishers. Bradbury and Evans capitalised on newly evolving mass printing technologies and also were the publishers for Charles Dickens and William Makepeace Thackeray.

=== Cartoon terminology ===
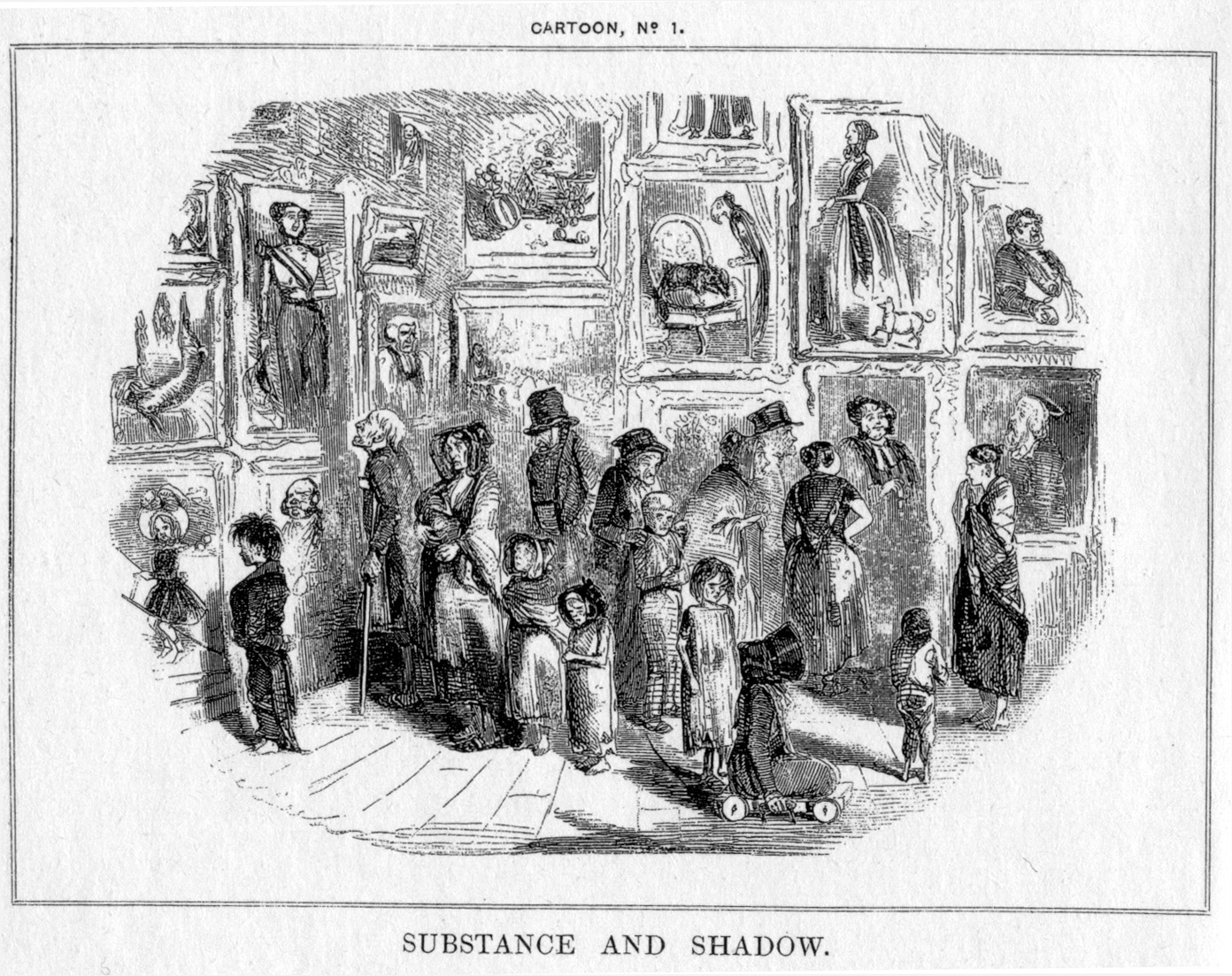
John Leech, Substance and Shadow (1843), published as Cartoon, No. 1

The term "cartoon" to refer to comic drawings was first used in Punch in 1843, when the Houses of Parliament were to be decorated with murals, and "cartoons" for the mural were displayed for the public; the term "cartoon" then meant a finished preliminary sketch on a large piece of cardboard, or cartone in Italian. Punch humorously appropriated the term to refer to its political cartoons, and the popularity of the Punch cartoons led to the term's widespread use.

=== Artistry ===
Illustrator Archibald Henning designed the cover of the magazine's first issues. The cover design varied in the early years, though Richard Doyle designed what became the magazine's masthead in 1849. Artists who published in Punch during the 1840s and 1850s included John Leech, Doyle, John Tenniel, and Charles Keene. This group became known as "The Punch Brotherhood", which also included Charles Dickens, who joined Bradbury and Evans after leaving Chapman and Hall in 1843. Punch's authors and artists also contributed to another Bradbury and Evans literary magazine called Once A Week (est. 1859), created in response to Dickens' departure from Household Words.

Helen Hoppner Coode contributed nineteen drawings to Punch and is recognised as its first woman contributor.

=== Liberal competition ===
In the 1860s and 1870s, conservative Punch faced competition from upstart liberal journal Fun, but after about 1874, Fun's fortunes faded. At Evans's café in London, the two journals had "round tables" in competition with each other.

=== Gaining a market and relations with other papers ===
After months of financial difficulty and lack of market success, Punch became a staple for British drawing rooms because of its sophisticated humour and absence of offensive material, especially when viewed against the satirical press of the time. The Times and the Sunday paper News of the World used small pieces from Punch as column fillers, giving the magazine free publicity and indirectly granting a degree of respectability, a privilege not enjoyed by any other comic publication. Punch shared a friendly relationship with not only The Times, but also journals aimed at intellectual audiences such as the Westminster Review, which published a 53-page illustrated article on Punch's first two volumes. Historian Richard Altick writes that "To judge from the number of references to it in the private letters and memoirs of the 1840s...Punch had become a household word within a year or two of its founding, beginning in the middle class and soon reaching the pinnacle of society, royalty itself".

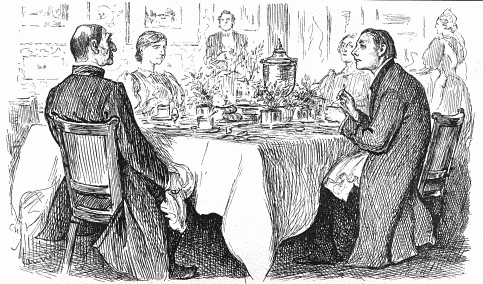
"True Humility": Bishop: "I'm afraid you've got a bad egg, Mr Jones"; Curate: "Oh, no, my Lord, I assure you! Parts of it are excellent!" George du Maurier, 1895

Increasing in readership and popularity throughout the remainder of the 1840s and '50s, Punch was the success story of a threepenny weekly paper that had become one of the most talked-about and enjoyed periodicals. Punch enjoyed an audience including Elizabeth Barrett, Robert Browning, Thomas Carlyle, Edward FitzGerald, Charlotte Brontë, Queen Victoria, Prince Albert, Ralph Waldo Emerson, Emily Dickinson, Herman Melville, Henry Wadsworth Longfellow, and James Russell Lowell. Punch gave several phrases to the English language, including The Crystal Palace, and the "Curate's egg" (first seen in an 1895 cartoon by George du Maurier). Several British humour classics were first serialised in Punch, such as the Diary of a Nobody and 1066 and All That. Towards the end of the 19th century, the artistic roster included Harry Furniss, Linley Sambourne, Francis Carruthers Gould, and Phil May. Among the outstanding cartoonists of the following century were Bernard Partridge, H. M. Bateman, Bernard Hollowood (who also edited the magazine from 1957 to 1968), Kenneth Mahood, and Norman Thelwell.

Circulation broke the 100,000 mark around 1910, and peaked in 1947–1948 at 175,000 to 184,000. Sales declined steadily thereafter; ultimately, the magazine was forced to close in 2002 after 161 years of publication.

Punch was widely emulated worldwide and was popular throughout the British Empire. The experience of Britons in British colonies, especially in India, influenced Punch and its iconography. Tenniel's Punch cartoons of the 1857 Sepoy Mutiny led to a surge in the magazine's popularity. India was frequently caricatured in Punch and was an important source of knowledge on the subcontinent for British readers.

=== Later years ===
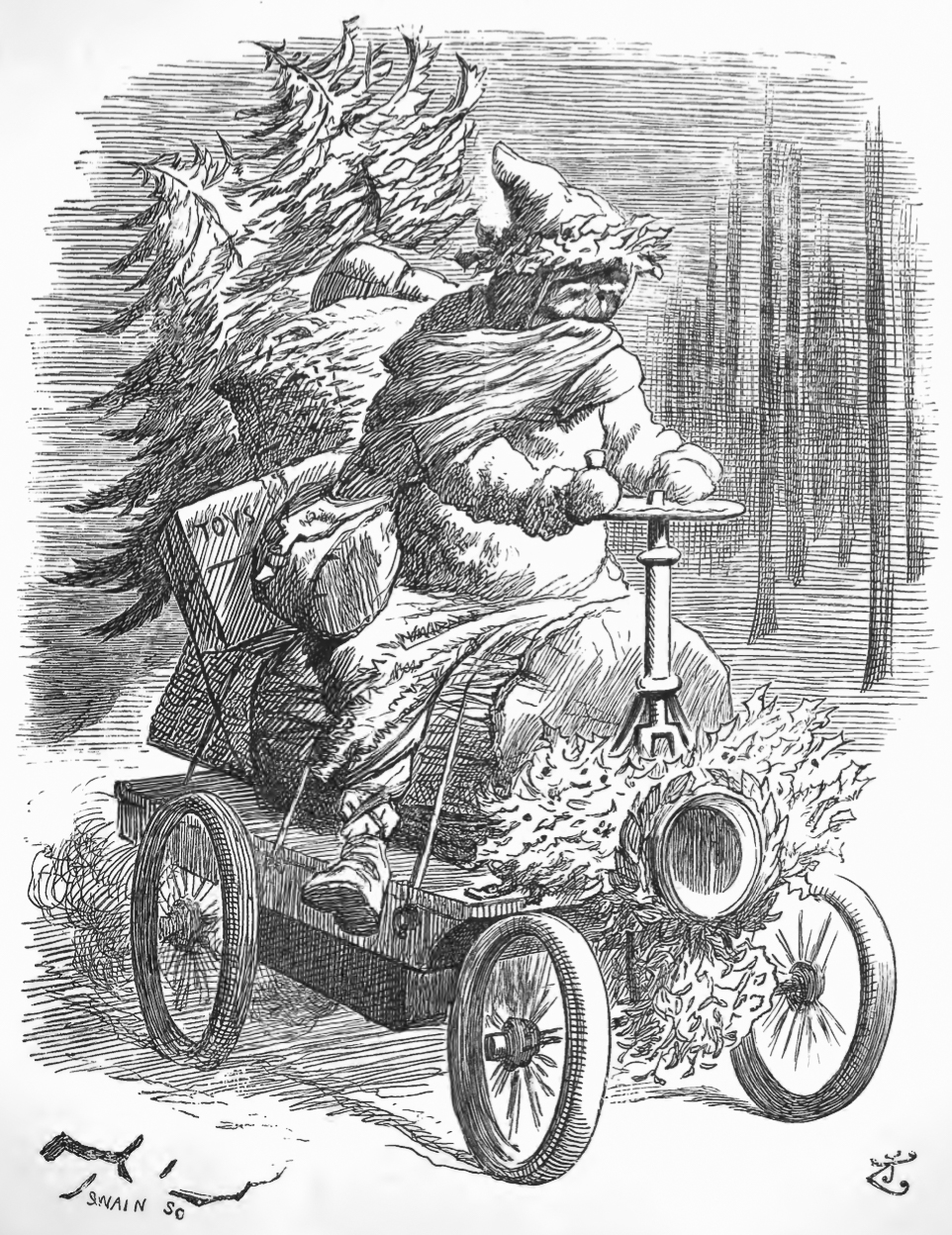
1896 cartoon by John Tenniel of Father Christmas driving an early car

Punch material was collected in book formats from the late 19th century, which included Pick of the Punch annuals with cartoons and text features, Punch and the War (a 1941 collection of WWII-related cartoons), and A Big Bowl of Punch – which was republished a number of times. Many Punch cartoonists of the late 20th century published collections of their own, partly based on Punch contributions.

In early 1996, businessman Mohamed Al-Fayed relaunched Punch. Punch never became profitable in its new incarnation, and at the end of May 2002, it was announced as once more ceasing publication. Press reports estimated a loss of between £10 and £16 million over the six years of publication, with around 6,000 subscribers at the end.

Whereas the earlier version of Punch prominently featured the clownish character Punchinello (Punch of Punch and Judy) performing antics on front covers, the resurrected Punch did not use the character, but featured on its weekly covers a photograph of a boxing glove, thus informing its readers that the new magazine intended its name to mean "punch" in the sense of a boxing blow.

=== Punch table ===
Early in the magazine's history, Bradbury and Evans bought a deal dining table for its offices, (Note: The precise time of the acquisition is apparently not clear, but John Leech dated the carving of his initials on the table 1854; signatory Douglas Jerrold died 1857.) and this was used for staff meetings and on other occasions. The wooden surface is scarred with the carved initials of the magazine's long-term writers, artists, and editors, as well as six invited "strangers", including James Thurber and Charles III (then Prince of Wales). Mark Twain declined the invitation, saying that the already-carved initials of William Makepeace Thackeray included his own. After Al-Fayed bought the magazine, the table briefly sat in the boardroom at Harrods; then, in 2004, it was among the Punch archives acquired by the British Library. Also acquired was a statue of "Mr Punch" based on a drawing by Bernard Partridge, which once stood outside the magazine's Bouverie Street offices, and is on display on the terrace outside the Library's restaurant.

== Gallery of selected early covers ==
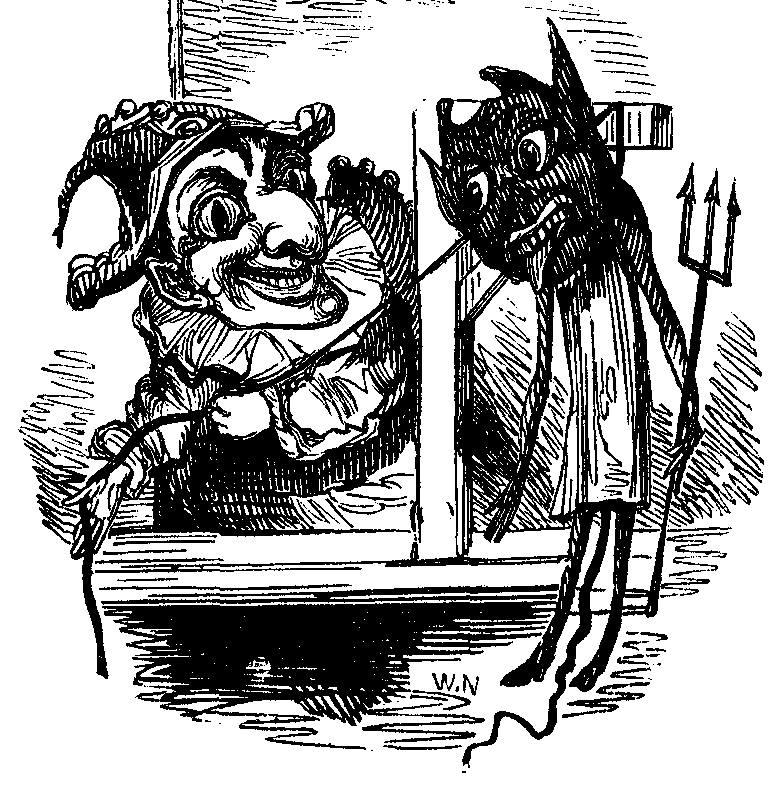
Detail of Punch hanging the Devil from first cover in 1841

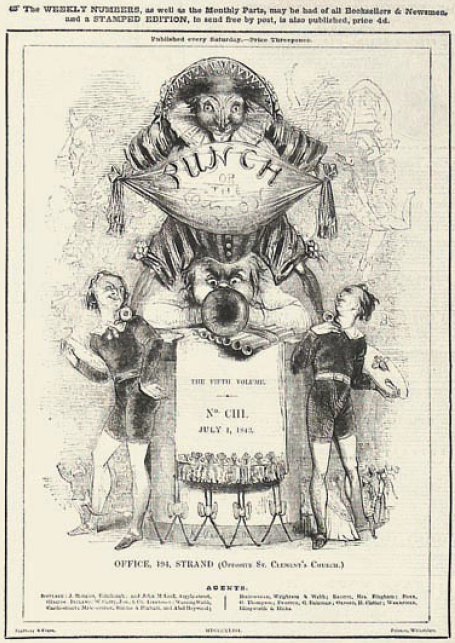
1843: 1 July cover shows Punch straddling a trumpeter.

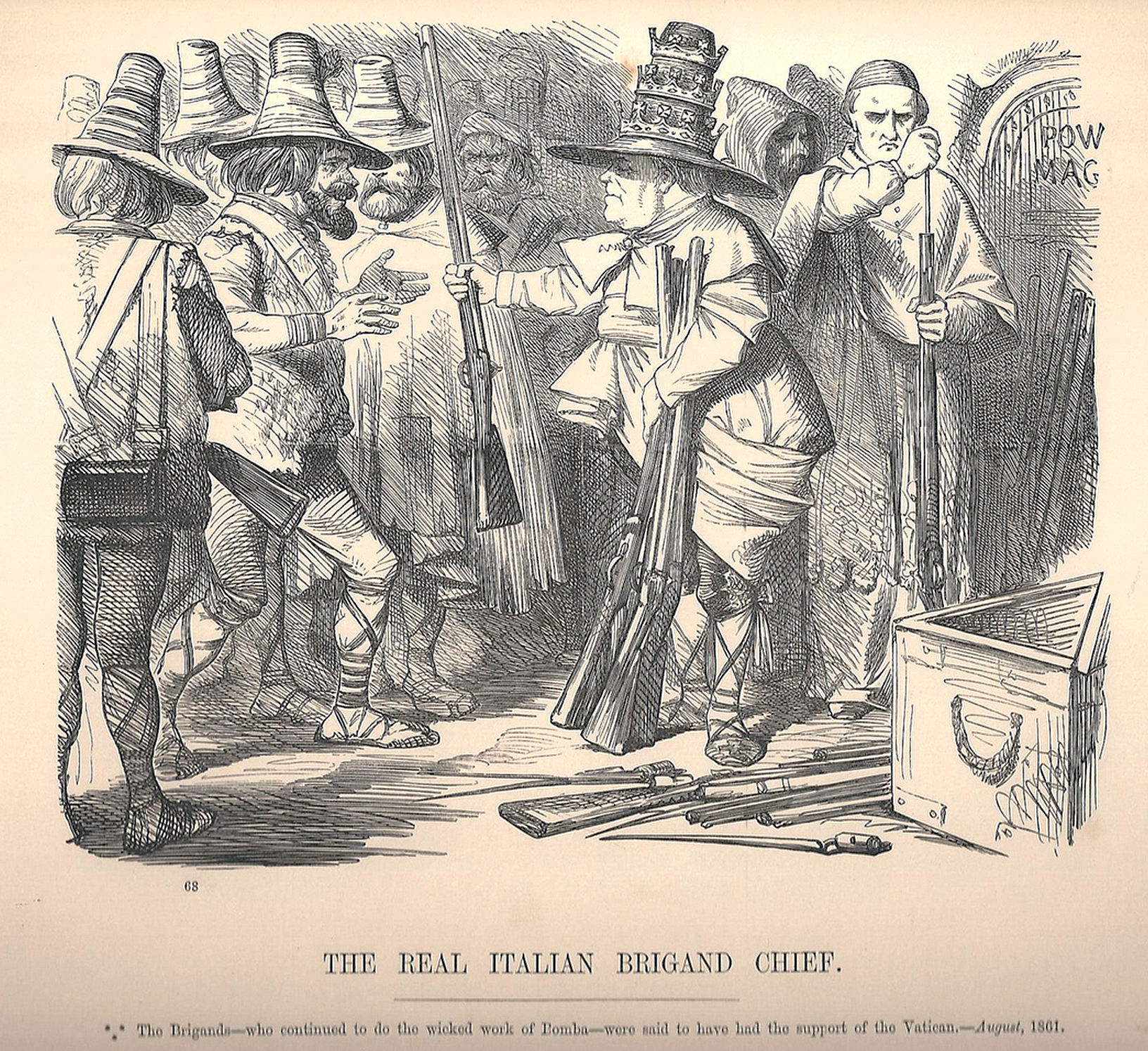
1861: 24 August cover shows Pope Pius IX delivering weapons to the Southern Italian brigands.

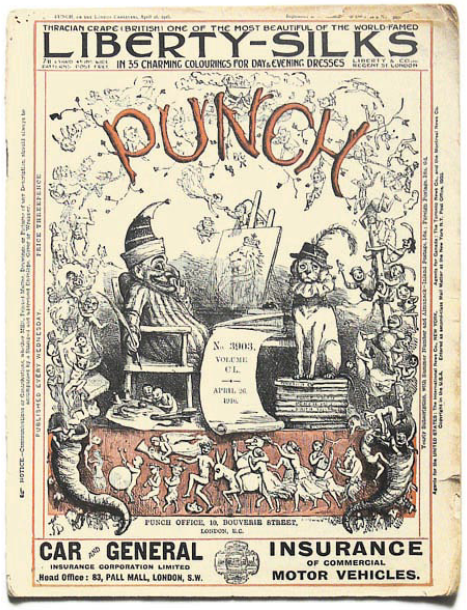
1916: 26 April cover shows Richard Doyle's 1849 masthead with colour and advertisements.

== Contributors ==
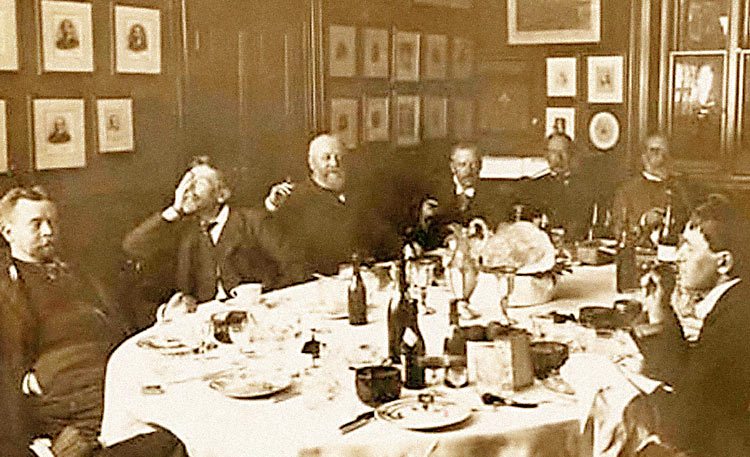
Editorial meeting of Punch magazine in the late 19th century

=== Editors ===
- Mark Lemon (1841–1870)
- Henry Mayhew (1841–1842)
- Charles William Shirley Brooks (1870–1874)
- Tom Taylor (1874–1880)
- Sir Francis Burnand (1880–1906)
- Sir Owen Seaman (1906–1932)
- E. V. Knox (1932–1949)
- Kenneth Bird (1949–1952)
- Malcolm Muggeridge (1953–1957)
- Bernard Hollowood (1958–1968)
- William Davis (1969–1977)
- Alan Coren (1978–1987)
- David Taylor (1988)
- David Thomas (1989–1992)
- Peter McKay (September 1996 – 1997)
- Paul Spike (1997)
- James Steen (1997–2001)
- Richard Brass (2001–2002)

=== Cartoonists ===
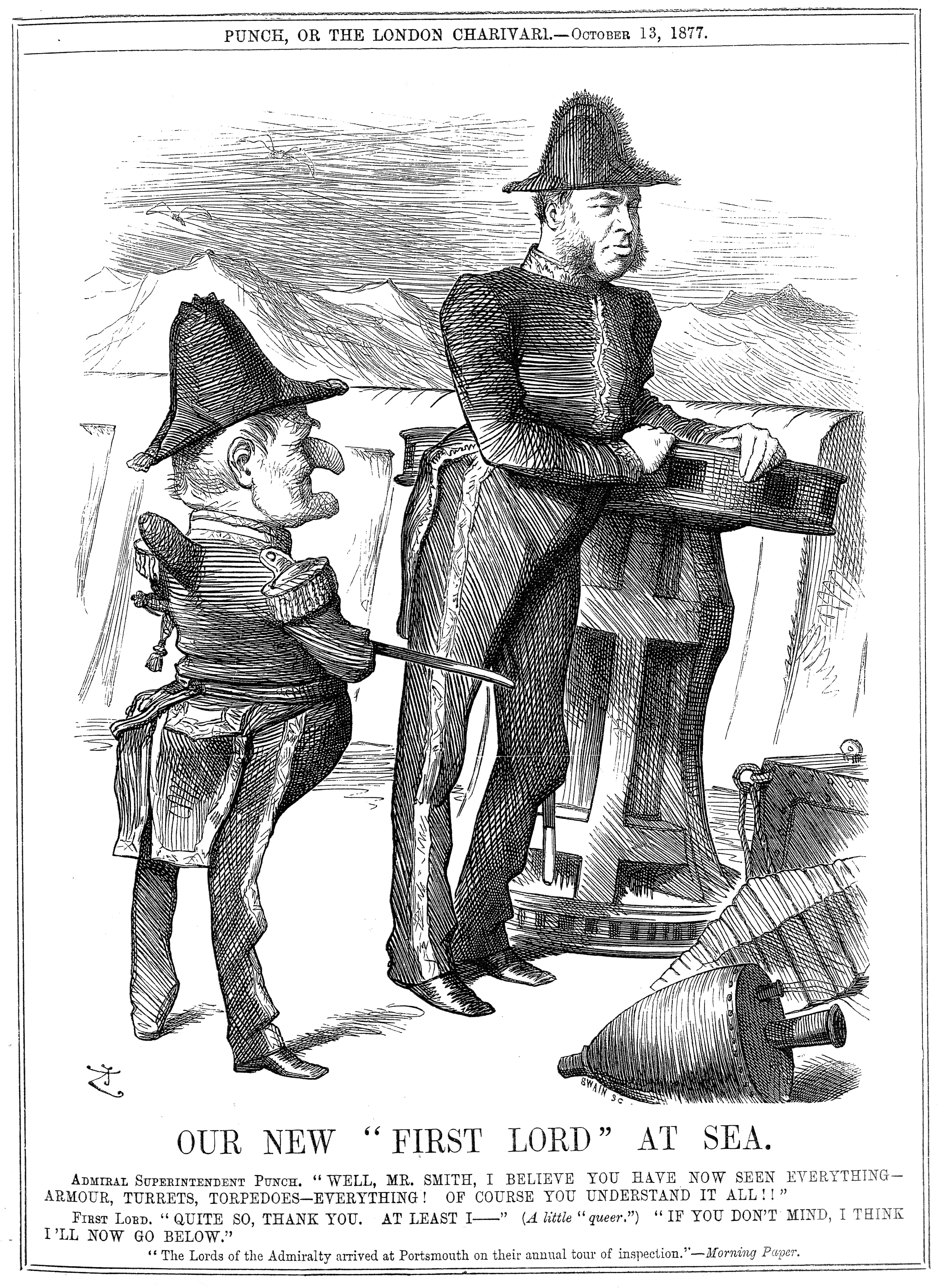
John Tenniel's "Our New 'First Lord' at Sea" (satirising the appointment of W. H. Smith) for the 13 October 1877 issue

- Acanthus (Frank Hoar)
- Arnold Wiles
- George Adamson
- Anton (Antonia Yeoman)
- Edward Ardizzone
- George Denholm Armour
- Murray Ball
- Lewis Baumer
- George Belcher
- C. H. Bennett
- Nicolas Bentley
- Alfred Bestall (who also illustrated Rupert Bear)
- Quentin Blake
- Russell Brockbank
- Eric Burgin
- Richard Burnie
- Clive Collins
- Helen Hoppner Coode
- Bernard Cookson
- Paul Crum (Roger Gamelyn Pettiward)
- Richard Doyle (who also illustrated Charles Dickens's Christmas books)
- Stan Eales
- Rowland Emett
- ffolkes (Michael Davies)
- Noel Ford
- Myles Birket Foster
- Fougasse (Kenneth Bird)
- André François
- Peter Fraser
- David Louis Ghilchik
- Pericle Giovannetti
- Alex Graham (creator of Fred Basset)
- William Haefeli
- J. B. Handelsman
- Harry Hargreaves
- Michael Heath
- William Hewison
- Martin Honeysett
- Leslie Gilbert Illingworth
- Ionicus (Joshua Charles Armitage)
- John Jensen
- Charles Keene
- David Langdon
- Larry (Terrence Parkes)
- John Leech
- Raymond Lowry
- George du Maurier (also the author of Trilby)
- Kenneth Mahood
- Norman Mansbridge
- Phil May
- Brooke McEldowney
- Rod McKie
- Ed McLachlan
- Arthur Wallis Mills
- Benjamin Minns
- George Morrow
- Nick Newman
- Bernard Partridge
- Frederick Pegram
- Matt Percival
- Bruce Petty
- John Phillips
- Bertram Prance
- Pont (Graham Laidler)
- Matt Pritchett
- Arthur Rackham
- Roy Raymonde
- Leonard Raven-Hill
- Edward Tennyson Reed
- Albert Rusling
- Edward Linley Sambourne
- Gerald Scarfe
- Ronald Searle
- Ralph Steadman
- E. H. Shepard (who also illustrated Winnie-the-Pooh)
- James Affleck Shepherd
- Robert Sherriffs
- C. A. Shepperson
- William Sillince
- George Sprod
- George Loraine Stampa
- John Tenniel (who also illustrated Alice in Wonderland)
- Norman Thelwell
- Herbert Samuel "Bert" Thomas
- Bill Tidy (who attempted to buy Punch when it went out of publication)
- F. H. Townsend
- Trog (Wally Fawkes)
- Arthur Watts
- Starr Wood

=== Authors ===
- Gilbert Abbott à Beckett
- Kingsley Amis
- Alex Atkinson
- Joan Bakewell
- Nigel Balchin
- John Betjeman
- Basil Boothroyd
- Michael Bywater
- Jono Coleman
- Quentin Crisp
- E. M. Delafield
- Hunter Davies
- Peter Dickinson
- Willard R. Espy
- Rachel Ferguson
- Penelope Fitzgerald
- Alexander Frater
- Joyce Grenfell
- A. P. Herbert
- John Hollingshead
- Thomas Hood
- Chris Hutchins
- Douglas William Jerrold
- Dillie Keane
- C. S. Lewis (under pseudonym N. W.)
- E. V. Lucas
- Henry Lucy
- Lord Mancroft
- Olivia Manning
- Somerset Maugham
- George du Maurier
- George Melly
- John McCrae
- John McVicar
- A. A. Milne
- Michael Moorcock
- Sylvia Plath
- I. S. O. Playfair
- Jessie Pope
- Anthony Powell
- W. C. Sellar
- Stevie Smith
- Jan Struther
- Mitchell Symons
- William Makepeace Thackeray
- Artemus Ward
- P. G. Wodehouse
- Keith Waterhouse
- R. J. Yeatman

== Influence ==
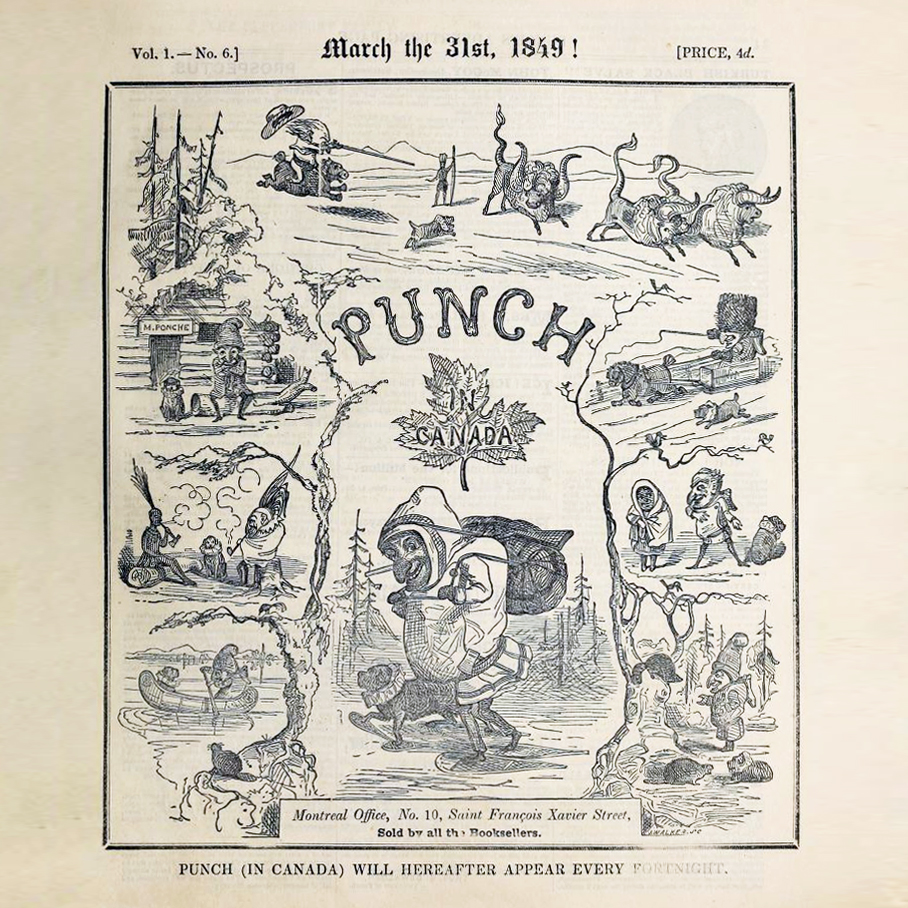
A whole-page cartoon from Punch in Canada, volume 1 issue 6 (31 March, 1849), by its founder John H. Walker

Punch was influential throughout the British Empire, and in countries including Turkey, India, Japan, and China, with Punch imitators appearing in Cairo, Yokohama, Tokyo, Hong Kong, and Shanghai.

A Canadian version, Punch in Canada, was launched on 1 January 1849. The magazine was published by Thomas Blades de Walden, a dilapidated member of one of the great aristocratic families of England, and an associated of the officers of the garrison stationed in Toronto. According to John Henry Walker, a wood engraver working for Punch, the magazine was doing well. However, the production ceased abruptly in 1850 when De Walden and Charles Dawson Shanly fled to New York.

- Punch gave its name to the Lucknow-based satirical Urdu weekly Awadh Punch (1877–1936), which, in turn, inspired dozens of other "Punch" periodicals in India.
- University of Pennsylvania humour magazine the Pennsylvania Punch Bowl derived its name from this magazine.
- Australia's Melbourne Punch was inspired by the London original.
- Charles Wirgman's Japan Punch (1862–1865, 1865–1887) was based on Punch and went on to inspire elements of modern manga.
- China Punch, established in 1867 in Hong Kong, was the first humour magazine in greater China. It was followed in 1871 in treaty-port Shanghai by Puck, or the Shanghai Charivari.
- Punch along with founder Henry Mayhew were included in Terry Pratchett's non-Discworld novel Dodger.

== See also ==
- Works originally published in Punch magazine
- Prehistoric Peeps, cartoons by Edward Tennyson Reed
- William Synge
- Puck (magazine), similar magazine published in the United States

== Works cited ==
- Appelbaum, Stanley; Kelly, Richard Michael (1981). Great Drawings and Illustrations from Punch, 1841–1901: 192 Works by Leech, Keene, Du Maurier, May and 21 Others. Courier Dover Publications. ISBN 978-0-486-24110-4.
