= Alternative media in the United Kingdom =

A list of alternative news media outlets in the United Kingdom.

== Left-wing ==
Alternative media from a left-wing perspective:

- Another Angry Voice (2010–present)
- Bright Green (2010–present)
- Double Down News (2016–present)
- Evolve Politics (2015–present)
- Left Foot Forward (2009–present)
- Lobster (1983–present)
- Novara Media (2011–present)
- Open Democracy (2001–present)
- The Canary (2015–present)
- The Skwawkbox (2012–present)
- Tribune (1937–present)

== Centrist ==
Alternative media from a centrist perspective:

- Byline Times (2018–present)
  • Byline TV (2020–present)
- The London Economic (2013–present)

== Right-wing ==
Alternative media from a right-wing perspective:

- Guido Fawkes (2004–present)
- The Light (with far-right links) (2020–present)
- Westmonster (2017–present)
