= The Skwawkbox =

British left-wing news site

- Website type: News website
- Editor: Steve Walker
- Website: skwawkbox.org
- Launched: 2012

The Skwawkbox is a left-wing news site based in the United Kingdom, founded in 2012 by Steve Walker.

== Aims ==
The Skwawkbox states that its aim is to "present information and analysis that will rarely make it into the mainstream media." Founder Steve Walker said in 2017 that: "The people we're trying to reach are what we call the outer parts of the Venn diagram. Not the real dedicated people on the left, but maybe their auntie or their uncle who reads their Facebook page."

== Content ==
According to BuzzFeed, The Skwawkbox has published a "regular run of stories that appear to have been briefed by insiders close to the top of the Corbyn project", suggesting that certain senior individuals in the Labour Party use it to get their messages out. It has been involved in rallying online support for pro-Corbyn hashtags on Twitter and emailing and petitioning MPs within the Labour Party.

In common with other left-wing alternative media sites, The Skwawkbox's stance towards the Labour leadership became more critical after Corbyn stepped down and Keir Starmer was elected as Labour leader in 2020.

=== Grenfell Tower fire ===
In June 2017, The Skwawkbox published an article suggesting that the real death toll from the Grenfell Tower fire was being covered up, based on claims from "multiple sources" that the government had placed a D-Notice on coverage. A correction was published later.

There was no such notice, which led MailOnline and The Sun in turn to publish articles accusing the site of spreading "fake news". Walker complained about the MailOnline article to the Independent Press Standards Organisation. IPSO concluded that the MailOnline characterisations of the D-Notice story as "fake news" and of allegations against Theresa May in the article as "false" were not misleading and the complaint was not upheld. See 16690-17 Walker v Mail Online.

The MailOnline D-Notice story referred to Steve Walker's business dealings with the NHS. This aspect was also covered by The Sun. Both outlets published corrections to their accounts of these dealings. The IPSO ruling noted that MailOnline had offered to append the following footnote, with a similar wording to be published as a standalone correction:

A previous version of this article said that Foojit made money from the NHS "by selling its mailing system to the Levenshulme Health Clinic in Manchester". Mr Walker has contacted us to point out that in fact Foojit's mailing system software was provided to the Clinic for free. What the Health Clinic pays for is any letters it sends using Foojit's services. In addition the article has been amended to say that the Skwawkbox blog posts published by Mr Walker reported on claims made by other sources. We are happy to make this clear.

=== Libel case ===
In November 2019, Labour MP Anna Turley sued Unite the Union and Steve Walker, editor of The Skwawkbox, for libel in respect of an article which appeared on The Skwawkbox on 7 April 2017.

On 19 December 2019, following a six-day trial at the Royal Courts of Justice, Turley won the libel claim against Unite and Walker and was awarded damages of £75,000.

An application to appeal was filed, but refused on 7 May 2020.

== Regulation ==
The Skwawkbox subscribes to independent, Leveson-compliant press regulator Impress. In March 2018, Skwawkbox considered cutting ties with Impress following the publication of a controversial 1961 political pamphlet by key Impress supporter Max Mosley; however, it has remained a member. According to the regulator's 2017/18 annual report, it upheld three complaints against The Skwawkbox in the year up to 31 March 2018, the most of any member over the period. The same number of complaints were dismissed.

In November 2018, Impress ruled against The Skwawkbox for breaching standards in its reporting on Labour MP Wes Streeting. The complaint upheld was that the publishers did not take all reasonable steps to ensure accuracy, because Streeting had only been given four hours to respond to the blog's enquiry. The panel did not make a judgment on the factual accuracy of the article.

== Merger with The Canary ==
In September 2025 The Skwawkbox announced that it would be merging with the left-wing news website The Canary.

== See also ==
- Another Angry Voice
- Evolve Politics
- The London Economic
