= Byline Times =

Online newspaper and TV channel

- November 2025 cover
- Editor: Hardeep Matharu
- Staff writers: Adam Bienkov; Josiah Mortimer
- Categories: Politics, current affairs, social affairs,
- Frequency: Monthly
- Founder: Peter Jukes; Stephen Colegrave
- Founded: 2019
- Country: United Kingdom
- Based in: London
- Language: English
- Website: bylinetimes.com
- ISSN: 2632-7910

Byline Times is a British alternative media website and newspaper launched in 2019 by Peter Jukes and Stephen Colegrave, who are also its executive editors.

== History ==
=== Byline Media and Byline.com ===
After jointly registering the Greater Manchester-based company Byline Media Ltd in October 2014, the British entrepreneur Daniel Tudor and his South Korean colleague and fellow University of Oxford alumnus Lee Seung-yoon launched the crowdfunded media platform Byline.com that allowed "campaigning journalists" to make direct appeals to readers in April 2015.

By July 2015, it had 300,000 monthly visitors, and raised $850,000 in seed funding while the board of advisers was made up by the former editor-in-chief of The Economist Bill Emmott, the former editor-in-chief of The Sunday Times Harold Evans, and the playwright Peter Jukes who had joined as a columnist. Peter Jukes and Stephen Colegrave took over Byline.com in 2016.

=== Byline Times ===
In November 2018, Peter Jukes and Stephen Colegrave registered Byline Times Ltd as a Birmingham-based company, with 51% shares held by LC Nominees Ltd, a firm headquartered in the same city. The print newspaper Byline Times was then launched in the summer of 2019, with an initial subscriber base of almost 1,000. The newspaper is published monthly for subscribers, with three-quarters of the material restricted to print, while BylineTimes.com functions as a free news site. Byline Times's sister organisations are the former crowdfunding journalism platform Byline.com, investigative unit Byline Investigates, the Byline Times Podcast, Byline Books and the annual summer event Byline Festival. All are separate entities.

Byline Times is also published by Bywire News, an "independent blockchain news network", whose other partners include The Canary, Labour Buzz, Not the News, Business Wales, Our.London, and Media Reform Coalition (MRC) which, according to Bywire, means "each article contains a record on the blockchain detailing when it was created, by whom, and any revisions which are made and when". In 2020, Byline Media collaborated with George Llewelyn and Caolan Robertson to create Byline TV, a subscriber-funded video channel.

Byline Times was expanded in 2022 with the launch of Byline Supplement, the outlet's additional Substack newsletter. In July 2023, Byline Times had 29,000 paying subscribers, of whom 15,000 were to the print version, and a revenue of approximately £1m. Byline Audio was set up in 2024 to bring together the outlet's podcasts. In March 2025, Byline Times became regulated by the UK's official press regulator Impress.

== Staff ==
The editor of Byline Times is Hardeep Matharu. Other writers and staff include its Special Investigations Reporter Nafeez Ahmed, former Spectator political columnist Peter Oborne, former BBC journalist Adrian Goldberg who hosts the Byline Times Podcast, former BBC Panorama reporter John Sweeney, Kingston University's professor of journalism Brian Cathcart, investigative journalist Iain Overton, Compass director Neal Lawson, and author Otto English. The paper has also had contributions from others, including the actor and comedian John Cleese.

As of August 2024, Byline Times' full-time reporting team included Political Editor Adam Bienkov and Chief Reporter Josiah Mortimer. The title employed 8 permanent staff members and had 30 writers on monthly retainer and 500 freelancers to call upon, which represented an increase from 5 permanent staffers and 15 regular columnists in July 2023.

== Editorial stance ==
Interviewed in 2019, Matharu described the purpose of Byline Times as to "really dig down and investigate [...] pressing social issues, many of them to do with justice, or a lack of, which for one reason or another are not being widely or extensively reported on elsewhere." Jukes described the newspaper as providing "what the [other] papers don't say" and said it would be similar in tone to the broadsheet news magazine FT Weekend.

Peter Jukes told Press Gazette in 2023 that the outlet was "not politically aligned" and "not ideological", while professing a belief in liberal democracy, transparency and tackling corruption.

== Reception ==
Byline Times was showcased at the 2019 Trust in Journalism Conference, organised by Impress. In February 2024, it was described by NewsNow Publishing in a testimony made to the House of Lords Communications and Digital Select Committee as a "successful example of non-local reader-funded 'alternative' news media outlet", alongside Double Down News and Declassified UK.

Mike Berners-Lee (brother of Sir Tim Berners-Lee) judged Byline Times to have "a very credible set of journalists" and stated that he "couldn't think of an example of it having been factually wrong", although he expressed a wish for its sources to be cited more frequently. He described it as a "counter-balance to the billionaire-dominated British press".

== Significant stories ==
Stories broken by Byline Times have been picked up by other media outlets. These include allegations of cronyism in the Johnson government's allocation of contracts during the COVID-19 pandemic.

In July 2023, Byline Times broke allegations of sexual impropriety by the journalist Dan Wootton, based on the investigations of former News of the World journalists Dan Evans and Tom Latchem. Wootton denied the allegations and sought to crowdfund legal fees for a case against the paper. Byline Times subsequently said its journalists had been targeted with threats and intimidation, without suggesting Wootton was involved. In February 2024 the Metropolitan Police announced they would be taking no further action in respect of the matter.

In November 2025, Byline Times reported that Jeffrey Epstein suggested Steve Bannon start a church for what Epstein called "confession privilege" to "shield communications from the special counsel criminal investigation into Donald Trump regarding Russian interference in the 2016 elections, led by then FBI director Robert Mueller."

== See also ==
- Alternative media in the United Kingdom
