= Lee Seung-yoon (entrepreneur) =

South Korean entrepreneur (born 1989)

- 이승윤
- Born: 13 November 1990 (age 35); Seoul, South Korea
- Other name: SY Lee
- Education: BA; Fashion design and textiles
- Alma mater: Inha University; University of Oxford
- Occupation: Business executive
- Years active: 2016–present
- Title: Chief executive officer of Story Protocol (2022–present)

Lee Seung-yoon (Korean: 이승윤, born 13 November 1990) is a South Korean entrepreneur. He is a co-founder and the CEO of Story Protocol, a blockchain-based repository system for intellectual property, and co-founder of Radish, a serial fiction app which sold to Kakao for US$440 million.

== Early life ==
Lee was born in Seoul to Lee Hong-kun, an orthopedist, and Jung Sung-hye, a professor of fashion design and textiles at Inha University. Lee's grandfathers were both entrepreneurs.

== Education ==
In 2008, Lee travelled to the United States to spend the summer interning for Congressman Bobby Scott of Virginia's 3rd district. The following year, he interned at the National Assembly of the Republic of Korea.

From 2010 until 2014, Lee studied philosophy, politics and economics at Hertford College, Oxford. He served as president of the Oxford Union, an independent debating society, in 2012–13, and launched its YouTube channel.

== Career ==
In 2013, he worked as an intern at McKinsey. After graduating from the University of Oxford in 2014, Lee worked as a freelance interviewer for the Korean daily JoongAng Ilbo. He was also a contributing editor at Nicolas Berggruen's WorldPost. Convinced the existing advertising-based journalism model was unsustainable, he conceived Byline.com, a crowdfunding platform aimed at financing journalists. He registered the company in the United Kingdom with Daniel Tudor in October 2014, and secured $850,000 in seed funding from Kakao Corporation's founder Lee Jae-woong, Nicolas Berggruen, Eric X. Li and investor Ian Osborne. He launched the website with Tudor in April 2015 before handing it over to company adviser Peter Jukes and the Saatchi & Saatchi executive Stephen Colegrave in 2016.

Lee founded Radish Fiction in February 2016, reusing some of Byline's technology and staff.

Radish initially relied on user-generated content but later focused on original and in-house stories. It specializes in genres suited to episodic publishing, and monetizes by charging premium fees for immediate access to new chapters.

By January 2017, Radish had raised around $3 million in seed funding; in August 2020, it completed a Series A funding round of $63.2 million led by SoftBank Ventures Asia. Less than a year later, South Korean tech and entertainment conglomerate Kakao acquired Radish for $440 million.

Lee then worked briefly for Kakao Entertainment as its global strategy officer.

In 2022, Lee founded Story Protocol. The company was valued in 2024 at $2.25 billion after Andreessen Horowitz invested $80 million in a Series B funding round.

Early in Trump's second term, Lee jumped on the bandwagon of wealthier crypto investors like Justin Sun to adopt an eager, dutiful and deferential tone toward the Trump family, with whom Lee is fascinated.

In 2023, he was a Trilateral Commission's David Rockefeller Fellow.

== Recognition ==
In 2017, Lee was listed on the Forbes 30 Under 30.
