= Double Down News =

British digital newspaper

- Website type: News and media outlet
- Founder: Yannis Mendez
- Website: www.doubledown.news
- Launched: 2017
- Current status: Active

Double Down News (DDN) is a British alternative media outlet founded in 2017 by Yannis Mendez. Funded through Patreon, it produces films and interviews from a left-wing perspective. Double Down News' contributors have included Peter Oborne, George Monbiot, Guz Khan, Nabil Abdul Rashid and David Graeber.

== Content and coverage ==
Funded through Patreon, it produces interviews, films and short films from a left-wing perspective.

DDN contributors have included former Daily Telegraph journalist Peter Oborne, Guardian columnist George Monbiot, Darryl McDaniels, Chris Packham, Ken Loach, Guz Khan, Nabil Abdul Rashid, Owen Jones, David Graeber, John McDonnell, Peter Jukes, and Matt Kennard.

== History ==
In August 2017, DDN published a video related to "Traingate", when Jeremy Corbyn had been accused of lying about a Virgin train being full and him being forced to sit on the floor. Jasper Jackson of the New Statesman reviewed that though its video "tells a convincing and detailed account of the whole affair", and reflects poorly on mainstream media reporting, the video was misleading. It presented widely broadcast footage as "never-before seen" and does not disclose that the videomaker capturing footage for Corbyn was a director of DDN.

In October 2018, due to a "violation of community standards", Facebook removed a DDN video featuring George Monbiot talking about the alleged atrocities of Christopher Columbus. It was restored the following day, accompanied by an apology.

== See also ==
- The Grayzone (US)
- The Intercept (US)
- MintPress News (US)
- Novara Media (UK)
- The Canary
- The Real News Network
- Consortium News (US)
- Common Dreams
- Democracy Now! (US)
- Popular Resistance
- CounterPunch
- Shadowproof
- Truthdig
