= David Kogan =

British media executive, historian and journalist

David Barnett Kogan OBE is a British media executive, historian and journalist, living in London. He has worked as both a journalist and a senior executive at the BBC, Reuters Television, Granada Channels, Wasserman Media Group and Magnum Photos. He has written about the history of the Labour Party.

== Career ==
Kogan was educated at Haverstock Comprehensive School in Camden, London; and at Balliol College, Oxford. He has described himself as "absolutely Jewish, but it's never been a predominant part of my existence".

From 1982 he was a producer at BBC Radio working on Today; at BBC Television working on Newsnight and Breakfast Time; and at BBC America. From 1988 he was managing editor and then global managing director at Reuters Television. From 1996 he was executive director at Granada Channels. In 1998 he co-founded media advisory company Reel Enterprises with Sara Munds, and was its Chief executive officer (CEO). In 2011, Reel was acquired by Wasserman Media Group, where Kogan and Munds went to work in media rights. In 2014 he and Munds left and set up Exile Enterprises. Kogan was executive director/CEO of Magnum Photos from 2015 to 2019.

Kogan was the Premier League's chief media rights adviser from 1998 to 2015, and was described in The Irish Times as "a key architect of [the Premier League's] global financial success". Other media rights clients have included the English Football League, Premiership Rugby, the International Olympic Committee and the National Football League (NFL). He was awarded an OBE in the Queen's 2014 Birthday Honours for services to diplomacy, having been asked to provide advice on FCO Services funds. While at Magnum in 2018, prompted by allegations of sexual misconduct against two of its photographers, Kogan led the agency in creating a formal code of conduct for both its photographers and staff.

Kogan's first book was The Battle for the Labour Party, published with his uncle, Maurice Kogan, in 1981. The later Protest and Power: The Battle for the Labour Party (2019) is a 400-page book that builds on the earlier work, based on many interviews. William Davies described the latter work in The Guardian as a "meticulous review of four decades of intra-party struggles" up to February 2019, but one that offers "little sense of who and what really mattered".

In April 2020 Kogan became a director of LabourList, an independent news site for the Labour Party. He resigned as director in April 2025.

In May 2025, the Culture, Media and Sport Select Committee endorsed Kogan's appointment as Chair of the Independent Football Regulator. This was despite concerns being raised on the committee that there may be a perceived conflict of interest, given Kogan's history of donations to the Labour Party. A majority of the committee's members were from the Labour Party, and Kogan had recently made a political donation of £7,625 to Treasury minister Emma Reynolds.

== Publications ==
- The Battle for the Labour Party. 1981. With Maurice Kogan.
  - Second, updated edition. Fontana, 1982. ISBN 978-0006365129. Contains 2 additional chapters.
  - London: Bloomsbury Reader, 2018. ISBN 9781448217359.
- The Attack on Higher Education. London: Kogan Page, 1983. ISBN 9780850387551.
- Protest and Power: The Battle for the Labour Party. London: Bloomsbury Reader, 2019. ISBN 9781448217298.
