= Daniel Tudor =

Daniel Tudor may refer to:

- Daniel Tudor (footballer) (born 1974), Romanian football goalkeeper and coach
- Daniel Tudor (journalist) (born 1982), British journalist
