= Oh! My Part, You =

2020 South Korean television program

- Promotional poster
- Genre: Music; Mystery; Variety; Reality
- Presented by: Kyuhyun (Super Junior); Lim Hyun-ju
- Country of origin: South Korea
- Original language: Korean
- No. of seasons: 1
- No. of episodes: 11 + 1 pilot

Production
- Production location: South Korea
- Running time: 90 minutes
- Production company: MBC

Original release
- Network: MBC
- Release: January 10 – June 13, 2020

Oh! My Part, You (Korean: 오! 나의 파트, 너) is a South Korean television program which aired on MBC every Saturday at 21:05 (KST), starting from April 4 to June 13, 2020.

A pilot episode was aired on January 10, 2020, at 20:30 (KST), and was hosted by Jang Sung-kyu.

== Overview ==
It is a music inference game show where in each episode two reputable musicians (as Song Masters), with their own teams of panelists, find their singing partners among five contestants in which their real identities and singing abilities are unknown. They each seek to find the singing partners best suited for them for the perfect harmony collaboration performances, and compete which is the better one. The contestants can be of any background, and anyone can apply to be one through the show's official website.

=== Rules ===
- Usually, there is one tone-deaf contestant among the five contestants in each episode.
- First Round: The Part Song will be sung by all the contestants which are seen to be singing, but only one contestant is actually singing while the other contestants are lip-syncing. In the song performance, once the "Part Change" shows, the singing contestant will be changed to another contestant. Based on this round, the Song Masters each pick one contestant. After this round, the contestants picked will each perform a song as revelation of their identities.
  - For the regular broadcast, there are two Part Songs (typically one each by the Song Masters), and after the first Part Song (First Round for the regular broadcast), the Song Master with the selection priority will choose one contestant from the five.
  - After the second Part Song (Second Round for the regular broadcast), the other Song Master will choose one contestant from the remaining four.
  - If one team matched the correct singing part (or colour) to the contestant chosen, the original singing voice will be played. If not, an auto-tuned voice will be played.
- Second Round (Third Round for the regular broadcast): The first round is replayed among the three contestants, the difference being both Part Songs used for the episode will be combined. Based on this round, the Song Masters each pick one contestant (the Song Master without the selection priority for the First Round will choose first). After this round, the contestants picked will each perform a song as revelation of their identities.
  - Sometimes, hints to the remaining three contestants are given.
- If both Song Masters have chosen the same contestant, the contestant himself/herself will choose which Song Master he/she wants to collaborate with.
- The 1 contestant not chosen after the rounds is eliminated, but will perform a song on stage before leaving.
- The final battle will be between two teams of three singers (one Song Master and two contestants picked by the Song Master). Both teams have 30 minutes to practice their collaborations before performing. For the regular broadcast, the time given is one hour instead.
- The audience of 100 people will rate their performances, and the team with more points wins. For the regular broadcast, due to the COVID-19 pandemic in South Korea there will not be any audience. Instead, a small group forming the judge squad will decide the results.

== Cast ==
Based on the official website.

=== Hosts ===
- Kyuhyun (Super Junior)
- Lim Hyun-ju (Assistant host)

=== Fixed Panel ===
- Park Mi-sun
- Moon Hee-joon
- Hong Hyun-hee
- Park Kyung (Block B)

== Episodes ==
2020

| Ep. | Broadcast Date | Song Master | Panel Teams Members (Note: Names in bold are the fixed panel members of the show. This does not apply to the pilot episode.) | Part Songs | Partners Chosen (Note: Given nicknames are in brackets.) | Battle Song | Win/Lose (Points) (Note: In the case of a tie, it is a joint victory for the 2 teams.) |
|---|---|---|---|---|---|---|---|
| Pilot | January 10 | Kim Kyung-ho | Lee Yong-jin; Naeun (April); Carson Allen | Boohwal - Never Ending Story | Jung Yoon-ji (Taekwon Voice) (Note: Member of co-ed group K-Tigers Zero); Kim Jong-woo (World No. 1 Pretty Boy) | Forbidden Love (금지된 사랑) | Lose (81) |
| Pilot | January 10 | Seomoon Tak | Park Mi-sun; Lee Jin-ho; Rowoon (SF9) | Boohwal - Never Ending Story | Shin Kyung-sik (Moon Tak's Knight); Lee Chan-wook (Yeonsinnae Coffee Prince) | Love, Never Fade (사랑, 결코 시들지 않는...) | Win (95) |
| 1 | April 4 | Kim Yeon-woo | Moon Hee-joon; Hong Hyun-hee; Jimin (AOA); Kim Yo-han | Kim Yeon-woo - Farewell Taxi (이별택시); Jung Seung-hwan - The Fool (이 바보야) | Kim Sang-woo (Celeb Five); Hwang Hyun-kyu (Alone Coin Karaoke 20 Years) | Still Beautiful (여전히 아름다운지) | Win (92.8) |
| 1 | April 4 | Jung Seung-hwan | Park Mi-sun; Park Kyung; Kim Kyung-ho; Angelina Danilova | Kim Yeon-woo - Farewell Taxi (이별택시); Jung Seung-hwan - The Fool (이 바보야) | Kim Ji-cheol (Husband's Taste) (Note: Husband of Shin So-yul); Han Gi-joo (Marriage's God) | If It is You (너였다면) | Lose (91) |
| 2 | April 11 | Lee Eun-mi | Moon Hee-joon; Hwang Chi-yeul; Jimin (AOA); Lee Seung-hyub (N.Flying) | Lee Eun-mi - I Have A Lover (애인있어요); Brown Eyed Girls - Sign | Ji Soo-an (Big Mama's Apprentice) (Note: Member of girl group CRAXY, known by the stage name Swan); Seo Ho (24 Hours Not Enough) | You're Beautiful (너는 아름답다) | Win (96) |
| 2 | April 11 | Brown Eyed Girls | Park Mi-sun; Kim Yo-han | Lee Eun-mi - I Have A Lover (애인있어요); Brown Eyed Girls - Sign | Jang Soo-bin (Monthly Trainee) (Note: Debuted as a soloist with the stage name Wyne); Park Ga-ryeong (Steps of Kuk Hee) | Hot Shot | Lose (91) |
| 3 | April 18 | Younha | Moon Hee-joon; Hong Hyun-hee; Parc Jae-jung; Jeewon (Cignature) | Younha - Password 486 (비밀번호 486); Son In-ho - Taedong River With Much Hate (한 많은 대동강) | Lee Hae-sol (Children Song Festival Gold Award); Jang Myung-seo (Seoul National University 1st Place) | On A Rainy Day (비가 내리는 날에는) | Tie (93) |
| 3 | April 18 | Song Ga-in | Park Mi-sun; Park Kyung; Hwang Je-sung; Seol Ha-yoon | Younha - Password 486 (비밀번호 486); Son In-ho - Taedong River With Much Hate (한 많은 대동강) | Choi Yoo-jin (Just Song Festivals 70 Times); Jeon Na-young (Korea's Anne Hathaway) | Moon of Seoul (서울의 달) | Tie (93) |
| 4 | April 25 | Kim Hyun-chul | Park Mi-sun; Park Kyung; Shin Ji (Koyote); Yoon Chae-kyung (April) | Kim Hyun-chul - The Downfall of the Moon (달의 몰락); Noel - I Miss You (그리워 그리워) | Yoon Sang-hoon (Sangam's Emergency Landing); Jung Jae-ho (That Boss in Sinsa-dong) | Lifetime (일생을) | Lose (89) |
| 4 | April 25 | Noel | Moon Hee-joon; Hwang Chi-yeul | Kim Hyun-chul - The Downfall of the Moon (달의 몰락); Noel - I Miss You (그리워 그리워) | Han Sun-chun (Wangsimni Dancing King); Kim Jin-wook (1500 VS 1) | Propose (청혼) | Win (93) |
| 5 | May 2 | Kim Won-jun | Park Mi-sun; Park Kyung; Hwang Je-sung; Yoon Chae-kyung (April) | Kim Won-jun - After Everyone Sleeps (모두 잠든 후에); Lee Ji-hoon - Why The Sky (왜 하늘은) | Jung Hee-young (Dongguk University Theater And Film; Department 55th Graduating Class); Park Joon-sung (Gangnam station Exit 11) | Show | Win (95) |
| 5 | May 2 | Lee Ji-hoon | Moon Hee-joon; Hong Hyun-hee; Kang Kyun-sung (Noel); Ju Hak-nyeon (The Boyz) | Kim Won-jun - After Everyone Sleeps (모두 잠든 후에); Lee Ji-hoon - Why The Sky (왜 하늘은) | Shin Min-chul (Min-chul Over Flowers) (Note: Formerly a member of T-max); Choi Hye-sung (Choi Sae-ro-yi) | Doll (인형) | Lose (93) |
| 6 | May 9 | Seventeen | Park Mi-sun; Seol Ha-yoon | Seventeen - Very Nice (아주 NICE); Heize - You, Clouds, Rain (비도 오고 그래서) | Park Jun-woo (Little Park Hyo-shin); Shin Eun-seo (Who Did Who Did Great) | Home | Lose (89) |
| 6 | May 9 | Heize | Moon Hee-joon; Hong Hyun-hee; Jimin (AOA); Kim Kang-hoon | Seventeen - Very Nice (아주 NICE); Heize - You, Clouds, Rain (비도 오고 그래서) | Kang Han-gi-baek (Life's 2nd Period); Kang Shin-bi (National Singing Contest 2-time Champion) | Don't Know You (널 너무 모르고) | Win (91) |
| 7 | May 16 | Ha Dong-kyun | Park Mi-sun; Yoo Jae-hwan; Mijoo (Lovelyz); Kim Dong-han | Ha Dong-kyun - Please Love Her (그녀를 사랑해줘요); Kim Feel - Your Voice (목소리) | Song Min-joon (The center is Me); Choi Shin-sung (Strongest Changmin) | Us Back Then (그때 우린) | Lose (92) |
| 7 | May 16 | Kim Feel | Moon Hee-joon; Hong Hyun-hee; Jimin (AOA); Ren (NU'EST) | Ha Dong-kyun - Please Love Her (그녀를 사랑해줘요); Kim Feel - Your Voice (목소리) | Kwak Jae-won (Majang-dong General Kwak); Lee Nam-soo (I Can Hear Your Voice) | Someday, The Boy (그때 그 아인) | Win (94) |
| 8 | May 23 | So Chan-whee | Moon Hee-joon; Hong Hyun-hee; Eunhyuk (Super Junior); Jimin (AOA) | So Chan-whee - Tears; Sistar - Loving U | Kim Bo-kyung (Best Actress Award); Liu Tianhui (Heavenly Voice) | Forced to Send You (보낼 수밖에 없는 난) | Tie (88) |
| 8 | May 23 | Hyolyn | Park Mi-sun; Park Kyung; Chuu (Loona); Lee Dae-hwi (AB6IX) | So Chan-whee - Tears; Sistar - Loving U | Kim Min-kyung (Our Neighbourhood Music Grand Award); Koo Ye-jin (Elementary School President's Elder Sister) (Note: Elder sister of Koo Jun-hoe (iKON)) | Good Bye (안녕) | Tie (88) |
| 9 | May 30 | Park Sang-chul | Park Mi-sun; Kim Na-hee; Sam Okyere; Kim Jae-hwan | Park Sang-chul - Unconditional (무조건); Norazo - Superman (슈퍼맨) | Go Rani (Gugak's Large Yard); Kim Dae-jin (The Man of The King and the Clown) | A Man in the Harbour (항구의 남자) | Lose (93) |
| 9 | May 30 | Norazo | Moon Hee-joon; Hong Hyun-hee; Jimin (AOA) | Park Sang-chul - Unconditional (무조건); Norazo - Superman (슈퍼맨) | Jeon Gi-soo (The Old Man and the Sea); Jo Jun-ho (Mr. Zoo) | Brother (형) | Win (96) |
| 10 | June 6 | Soyou | Park Mi-sun; Parc Jae-jung; Lee Jun-young (U-KISS); Hyojung (Oh My Girl) | Soyou + Junggigo - Some; ALi - Ziugae (지우개) | Yang Ji-eun (Jeju Island Number 1) (Note: Later known as the winner of Miss Trot Season 2.); Hwang Seung-hyun (Broadcast Appearances 3 Times) | I Miss You | Tie (93) |
| 10 | June 6 | ALi | Moon Hee-joon; Hong Hyun-hee; Seo Eun-kwang (BtoB); Jimin (AOA) | Soyou + Junggigo - Some; ALi - Ziugae (지우개) | Bae Yoo-jin (Sundae-guk Voice); Lee Han-sol (Mermaid) | Pungpung (펑펑) | Tie (93) |
| 11 | June 13 | Boohwal | Moon Hee-joon; Hong Hyun-hee; Jimin (AOA); Soyeon (Laboum) | Boohwal - Lonely Night; Bobby Kim - Whale's Dream (고래의 꿈) | Kwon Young-bin (Year 1 Class 1 1st Place); Heo Jae-hyuk (Singer-songfighter 2) | Never Ending Story | Lose (90) |
| 11 | June 13 | Bobby Kim | Park Mi-sun; Yoo Jae-hwan; Luna (f(x)); Lee Jin-hyuk (UP10TION) | Boohwal - Lonely Night; Bobby Kim - Whale's Dream (고래의 꿈) | Bae Soo-eun (Strange Man's Elris) (Note: Manager of Elris); Noah (Man of Original Key) | Love... That Guy (사랑..그 놈) | Win (94) |

== Ratings ==
- Ratings listed below are the individual corner ratings of Oh! My Part, You. (Note: Individual corner ratings do not include commercial time, which regular ratings include.)
- The show will be aired in two parts. Only the higher rating of the two parts of each episode will be shown.
- In the ratings below, the highest rating for the show will be in red and the lowest rating for the show will be in blue each year.

2020

| Ep. # | Original Airdate | Nielsen Korea Ratings Nationwide |
|---|---|---|
| Pilot | January 10 | 3.5% |
| 1 | April 4 | 3.3% |
| 2 | April 11 | 3.0% |
| 3 | April 18 | 4.4% |
| 4 | April 25 | 3.0% |
| 5 | May 2 | 2.3% |
| 6 | May 9 | 2.5% |
| 7 | May 16 | 1.8% |
| 8 | May 23 | 2.5% |
| 9 | May 30 | 3.8% |
| 10 | June 6 | 3.8% |
| 11 | June 13 | 3.8% |
