= The London Economic =

British digital newspaper

- Website type: News & Media Outlet
- Owner: Greencastle Capital Limited
- Editor: Jack Peat
- Launched: 2013
- Current status: Active

The London Economic (TLE) is a digital newspaper based in the capital of the UK. It rose to prominence during the 2017 United Kingdom general election when it ran the most-shared political story on social media for that election cycle.

== History ==
The London Economic emerged from a political blog and developed through to 2014 into an alternative-news website, in an attempt to redress the "political power of the mainstream media", according to editor-in-chief Jack Peat. In June 2017, Peat joined Matt Turner of Evolve Politics, Stephen Glover of the Daily Mail, Aaron Bastani of Novara Media, Michael Heaver of Westmonster, Eve Pollard and David Yelland to discuss whether Britain's newspapers have lost their influence on British politics. Its scepticism of the mainstream media has given it an alternative media tag, one shared by political blogs such as The Canary, music bands such as Captain SKA and websites such as Novara Media.

== Ownership ==
In April 2020, The London Economic was taken over by the venture capital firm, Greencastle Capital Limited, which now holds a 51% stake. Following the takeover, The London Economic encountered criticism after it emerged that Greencastle Capital Limited's owner, David Sefton, has significant links to the fossil fuel industry.

=== NHS capped expenditure process ===
Following the Conservative–DUP agreement The London Economic published capped expenditure proposals outlined by Health secretary Jeremy Hunt which were claimed to ration NHS services, lengthen waiting times and lead to a "postcode lottery for your healthcare".

=== Insulate Britain protests ===
Extinction Rebellion co-founder Roger Hallam appeared on The London Economic's podcast Unbreak The Planet to discuss the Insulate Britain protests, saying he would "block an ambulance" in order to get the campaign group’s message across. Explaining his motives, he described climate change as "the biggest crime in human history imposed by the rich against the global poor".

== See also ==
- ConservativeHome
- Left Foot Forward
- Paul Staines
- Political Scrapbook
