= WCPR =

WCPR may refer to:

- Abbreviation for Weekend City Press Review
- WCPR (AM), a radio station (1450 AM) licensed to serve Coamo, Puerto Rico
- WCPR-FM, a radio station (97.9 FM) licensed to serve Wiggins, Mississippi, United States
- Weston, Clevedon and Portishead Railway
