= LabourList =

Media outlet based in the UK

- LabourList homepage in February 2009
- Website type: Online newspaper
- Available in: English
- Owner: Company limited by guarantee
- Editors: Derek Draper (Jan 2009 – May 2009); Alex Smith (May 2009 – Jun 2009); Mark Ferguson (Dec 2010 – May 2015); Peter Edwards (Jan 2016 – Feb 2018); Sienna Rodgers (Feb 2018 – Apr 2022); Elliot Chappell (April 2022 – Jan 2023 ) Tom Belger (Apr 2023 – Sep 2025); Emma Burnell (Sep 2025 –)
- Website: labourlist.org
- Commercial: No
- Launched: 10 January 2009
- Current status: Active

LabourList is a British news website which supports, but is independent of, the Labour Party, launched in 2009. Describing itself as Labour's "biggest independent grassroots e-network", the site's content includes news, commentary, interviews, campaign information, analysis and opinion from various contributors and sources across the Labour and trade union movement. It is funded by trade unions, adverts, and individual donors. LabourList started as a weblog with reader comments, but in February 2019 the ability for readers to write comments was removed.

== Contributors and content ==
The site features breaking news, analysis, opinion, policy and ideas from a broad cross-section of the Labour movement from activists to cabinet ministers, in addition to regular editorials and posts by the sitting editor and a core group of columnists. Ministers from the last Labour government who have blogged on the site include Peter Mandelson, Ed Balls, David Miliband, Ed Miliband and Douglas Alexander. Labour movement figures such as Alastair Campbell, Sunder Katwala formerly of the Fabian Society, Jessica Asato of Progress and Neal Lawson of Compass number among LabourList's other frequent contributors. Its first editor, Derek Draper, claimed that the site had done "exceptionally well" to "ask for advice and contributions from readers", leading to the "introduction of excellent new grassroots bloggers, like Dan McCurry", who "have much to contribute to the direction and strategy of our movement". The site has also developed journalists Laurie Penny and Rowenna Davis, and former editor Alex Smith.

== History ==
Draper commissioned Tangent, who had built the Labour Party's website, to build the LabourList website software in late 2008, prior to the website's launch on 10 January 2009. The official launch at Labour HQ was attended by Peter Mandelson, Douglas Alexander, Tom Watson and the Labour general-secretary Ray Collins. In April The Daily Telegraph reported that Draper had been discussing plans to set up another blog to post false rumours about the private lives of senior Conservative Party members.

In its first few months, much external commentary about LabourList was couched in the context of the site's problematic and controversial start, leading to the resignation of Draper, who had founded it as well as being the first editor. Writing on the publication of the Total Politics Top 100 Political Blogs, Conservative Party blogger Iain Dale wrote: "Perhaps the biggest achievement goes to LabourList and Alastair Campbell, who both enter the top twenty after only seven months of blogging activity. For LabourList to appear anywhere at all following its disastrous start under the leadership of Derek Draper is a minor miracle in itself. But its new editor Alex Smith has established it as a serious left of centre forum in a very short time".

In June 2009, LabourList became the British affiliate to American liberal news website The Huffington Post.

LabourList's coverage of an abortive coup against Gordon Brown in early 2010 drew more praise as the site cemented its reputation as a news source and a reliable barometer for the Labour Party grassroots. The academic Charlie Beckett wrote that LabourList has "recovered both credibility and relevance ... I suspect it will be at least as important as ConservativeHome in understanding Party mood and machinations in the future".

In 2010, LabourList hosted its first offline events including campaign events to coincide with the TV Leaders' Debates that were taking place during the 2010 General Election.

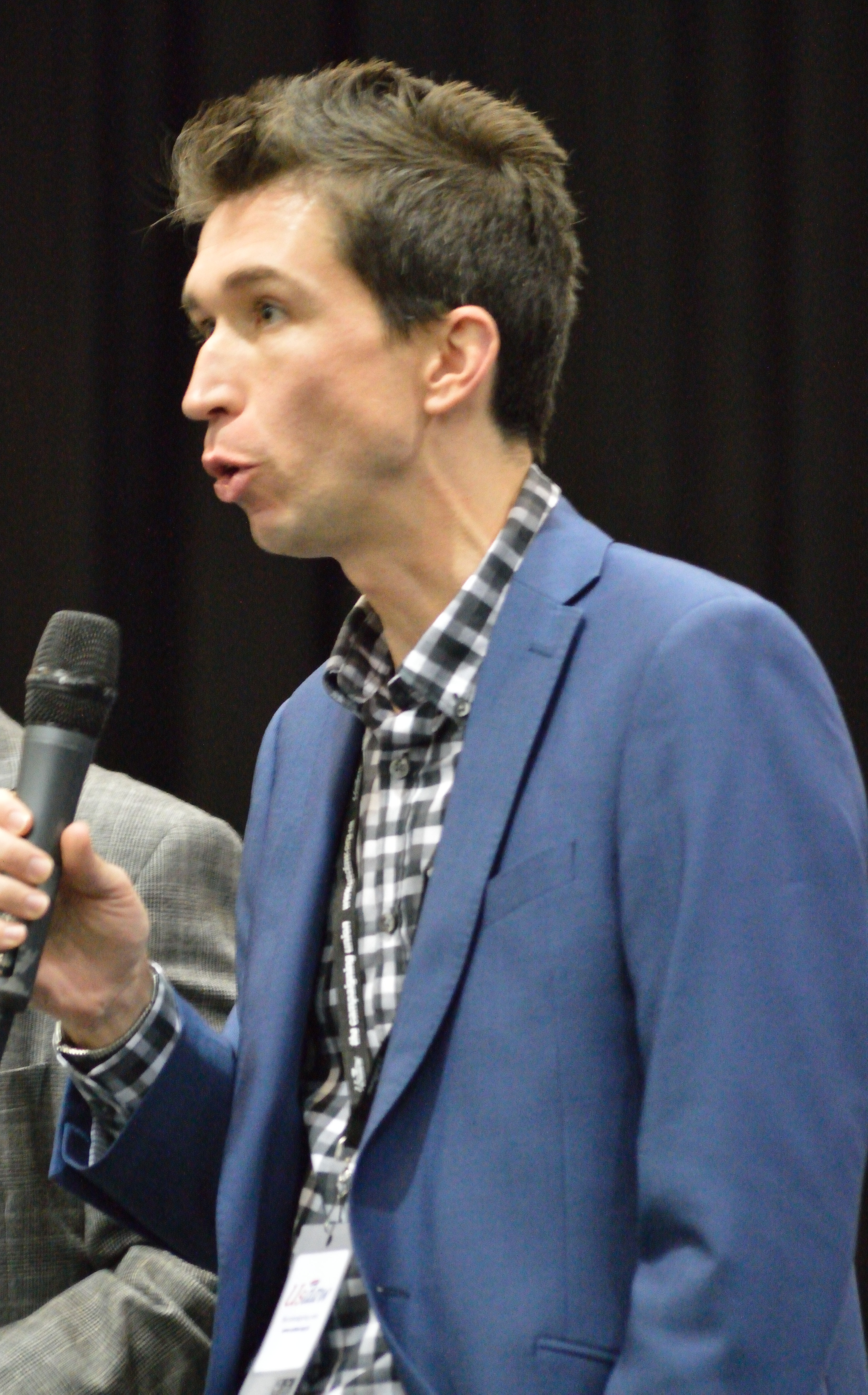
Editor Peter Edwards speaking at the LabourList fringe meeting at the 2016 Labour Party Conference

Editorial developments to the site under Mark Ferguson's editorship include monthly polls of its readership on the "State of the Party" and "Ed's Inbox", a daily aggregation of blogposts from across the blogosphere.

In 2018, a not-for-profit co-operative called Political Pixel started supporting the operation of LabourList, alongside the left-wing blogs Left Foot Forward and Political Scrapbook.

On 4 February 2019, a redesigned website was introduced, stylistically simpler with the intention that it would work better on mobile phones. At the same time, the capability for readers to write comments was removed because "too often the exchanges below-the-line became unpleasant and unconstructive". The site planned instead to engage with readers through surveys, noting that a previous survey showed that responders were "largely pro-Corbyn, pro-EU".

== Traffic and influence ==
In 2010 the website claimed to have over 305,000 readers visiting 2.5 million pages; 260 contributors writing well over 2,000 posts; 70,000+ reader comments; 3,500 subscribers to the LunchtimeList daily email; 17,300 Twitter followers; and 4,700 Facebook supporters. The site revealed in March 2011 that it had attracted 70,000 unique readers, its highest ever readership for a single month. According to rankings by Wikio in early 2010, which measure the "number and weight" of links coming in from other blogs, LabourList has become the second most influential left-wing political blog in Britain, the fourth most influential overall and the 18th most influential in Europe, and is growing in strength.

By the end of 2009 in an article on left-wing blogging, the editor of ConservativeHome Tim Montgomerie acknowledged that "there is more evidence today that the Left is getting its online effort together", citing LabourList, amongst others, for the growing credibility and influence of British left-wing sites.

On 29 January 2010, Labour cabinet minister Ed Balls said in interview that "LabourList is flourishing and agenda setting, and that's very powerful. It's brought a huge change over the last year. Two years ago, we weren't on the field when it came to new media. Now, I think we're ahead of the Tories in new communications. Our people are younger, they're in the real world, they're young parents or they're students, so we ought to be ahead of them in new communications. LabourList and Left Foot Forward are really, really good. A year on from Labour people really grasping this stuff, the reality is now reflected in what's going on."

== Personnel ==
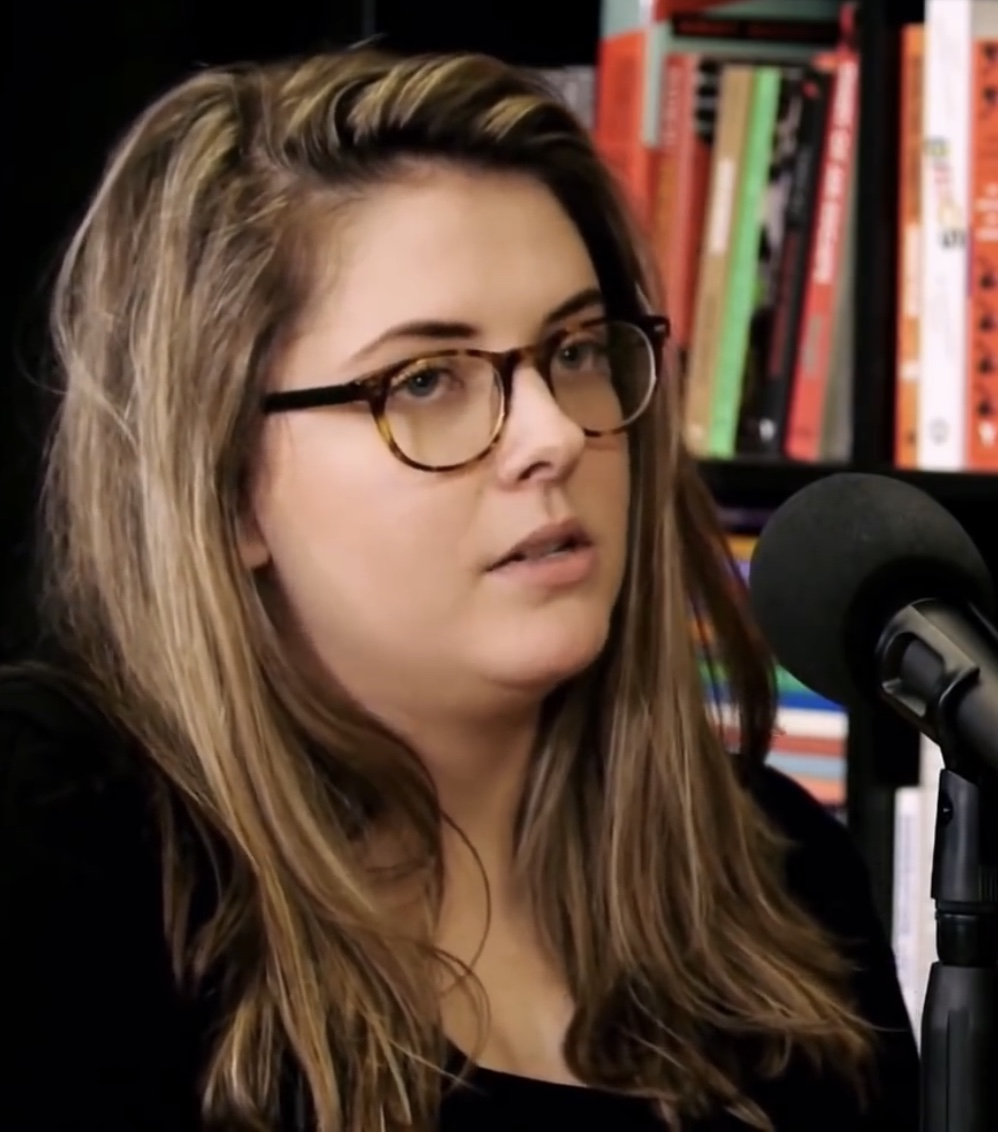
Sienna Rodgers, the editor between February 2018 and April 2022

Following the forced resignation of founder-editor Draper after a few months at the helm, the editorship passed to staffer Alex Smith in May 2009. After the election, Smith took a sabbatical to work as Director of Communications and Campaigns for Ed Miliband's successful Labour leadership campaign, after which he continued to work for Miliband.

In December 2010, Mark Ferguson, who was acting editor of LabourList from June, took over the role on a permanent basis. He remained editor until May 2015, when he became a senior adviser to Liz Kendall in her Labour leadership campaign. Ferguson later became the MP for Gateshead Central and Whickham at the 2024 general election.

In 2013, LabourList appointed two new directors, and started a fundraising campaign led by Peter Mandelson and John Prescott. The new directors were Benjamin Wegg-Prosser, Managing Partner of the strategic advisory firm Global Counsel and former Director of Strategic Communications at 10 Downing Street, and Greg Jackson, co-founder of C360 (later acquired by Tangent) which provided the software that runs the Labour Party website.

In February 2016 Peter Edwards, a former PPC, journalist and press secretary for Chris Leslie when he was shadow Chancellor and shadow Chief Secretary to the Treasury, became the new editor. Tom Happold remained Executive Editor.

On 7 February 2018, Sienna Rodgers was announced as the new editor.

In April 2020, David Kogan, author of two histories of the Labour Party in 1981 and 2019, became a director of LabourList. He resigned as director in April 2025, a month before he was endorsed as chair of the Independent Football Regulator.

On 8 April 2022, Sienna Rodgers left LabourList to become senior writer of The House magazine. Elliot Chappell was announced as the new editor.

In December 2022, Elliot Chappell announced he was stepping down as editor and pursuing a career in the law. Tom Belger joined as its new editor in April 2023.

Belger announced he was stepping down as editor in May 2025. He was replaced by Emma Burnell in September.

== Controversies ==
On 11 April 2009, it was reported by the Daily Telegraph that Gordon Brown's special adviser, Damian McBride, had sent a series of emails to Draper, discussing plans to set up a blog which would be used to post false rumours about the private lives of senior members of the Conservative Party.

McBride resigned later the same day, and 10 Downing Street issued an apology for the "juvenile and inappropriate" emails. Gordon Brown later sent personal letters to those who had been mentioned in the emails, expressing his regret over the incident.

In the wake of the incident, Labour sought to distance itself from LabourList owing to its connection with Draper. Draper also came under pressure to resign his post as editor of LabourList. On 6 May 2009, Draper stepped down from his position as Editor.

== See also ==
- ConservativeHome
- Liberal Democrat Voice
