= The Review =

The Review may refer to:

- The Review, a daily local newspaper in East Liverpool, Ohio
- The Review, a newspaper founded by Daniel Defoe in 1704
- The Review, a weekly newspaper that covers Glengarry—Prescott—Russell, Ontario, Canada
- The Review, a weekly newspaper at the University of Delaware
- UVU Review, an independent, student-run newspaper for Utah Valley University
- "The Review", a season 1 episode of the TV series Entourage
- The Weekend City Press Review, a UK weekly summary of business, corporate and economic news
- The Stanford Review, student newspaper in California, U.S.

== See also ==
- Review (disambiguation)
