= The Daily Slovak News =

Slovak online newspaper

- Type: Daily
- Format: Online newspaper
- Editor-in-chief: John Boyd
- Political alignment: Independent
- Language: English
- Headquarters: Bratislava
- Website: www.thedaily.sk

The Daily Slovak News (also known as TheDaily SK) is an English online newspaper headquartered in Bratislava, Slovakia.

== Profile ==
The Daily Slovak News covers current affairs, politics, business, legislation, foreign affairs, sport and culture. The editor-in-chief of the newspaper is John Boyd and Tony Papaleo is his deputy. The daily has the motto "your independent English news for Slovakia".
