= Jonathan Heawood =

English journalist and literary editor

- Occupations: Journalist and literary editor
- Organisation: Public Interest News Foundation
- Known for: Founder and former CEO of Impress
- Spouse: Amy Jenkins (m. 2004)
- Children: 1

Jonathan Heawood is an English journalist and literary editor. He is executive director of the Public Interest News Foundation, the first journalism charity in the UK to be awarded charitable status.

Heawood is the founder and former CEO of Impress, the only press regulator recognised under Royal Charter in the United Kingdom.

He is a former director of programmes at the Sigrid Rausing Trust, a private human rights foundation, Director of the English Centre of PEN International, deputy literary editor of The Observer and editor of the Fabian Review. He writes on cultural and political issues for a number of publications, including the Telegraph, Independent, The Guardian, London Review of Books and New Statesman.

Heawood has a PhD from the University of Cambridge. His book The Press Freedom Myth was published in 2019 by Biteback Publishing.

He is married to writer Amy Jenkins and they have one child. He is the great-grandson of Percy John Heawood, the mathematician.
