= Online newspaper =

Newspaper in digital format

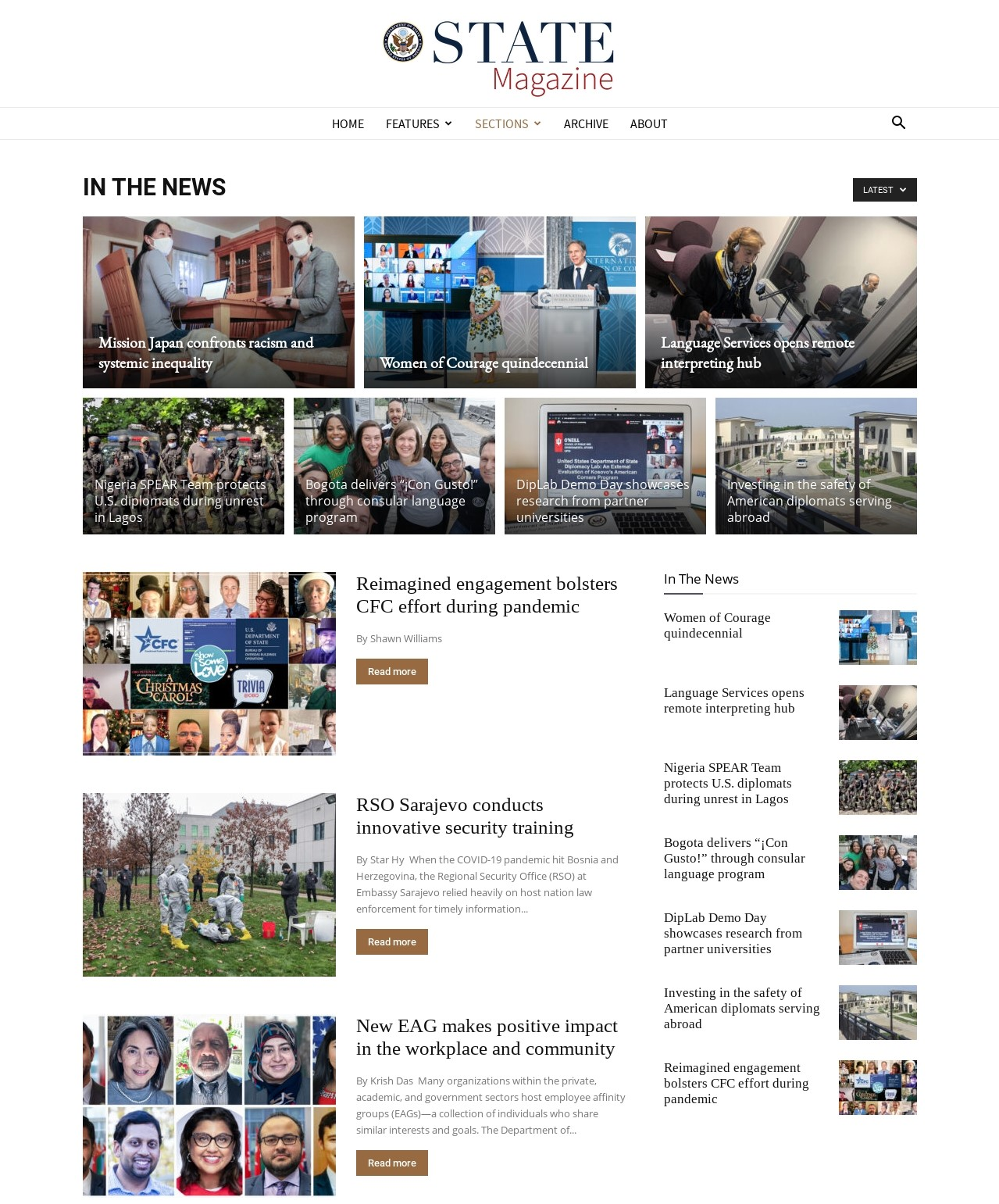
Screenshot of State Magazine (published by the US Department of State) which became an online-only publication in 2015

An online newspaper (or news website or electronic news or electronic news publication) is the online version of a newspaper, either as a stand-alone publication or as the online version of a printed periodical.

Going online created opportunities for newspapers, enabling them to compete with broadcast journalism by quickly publishing breaking news. The credibility and strong brand recognition of established newspapers, and relationships they have with advertisers, are all factors in increasing their competitiveness. Online publishing can also reduce costs associated with printing and distributing physical copies.

Online newspapers, like printed newspapers, have legal restrictions regarding libel, privacy, and copyright, also apply to online publications in most countries as in the UK. Also, the UK Data Protection Act applies to online newspapers and news pages. Up to 2014, the PCC ruled in the UK, but there was no clear distinction between authentic online newspapers and forums or blogs. In 2007, a ruling was passed to formally regulate UK-based online newspapers, news audio, and news video websites covering the responsibilities expected of them and to clear up what is, and what is not an online news publication.

News reporters are being taught to shoot video and to write in the succinct manner necessary for Internet news pages. Some newspapers have attempted to integrate the Internet into every aspect of their operations, e.g., the writing of stories for both print and online, and classified advertisements appearing in both media, while other newspaper websites may be quite different from the corresponding printed newspaper.

== History ==
An early example of an "online-only" newspaper or magazine was (PLATO) News Report, an online newspaper created by Bruce Parrello in 1974 on the PLATO system at the University of Illinois. The first newspaper to go online was The Columbus Dispatch on July 1, 1980. Beginning in 1987, the Brazilian newspaper Jornaldodia ran on the state-owned Embratel network, moving to the Internet in the 1990s. By the late 1990s, hundreds of U.S. newspapers were publishing online versions, but did not yet offer much interactivity. One example is Britain's Weekend City Press Review, which provided a weekly news summary online beginning in 1995. Today, online news has become a huge part of society which leads people to argue whether or not it is good for society. Austra Taylor, author of the popular book, The Peoples Platform, argues that online news does not provide the detail needed to fully understand what actually happened. It is more just a fast summary to inform people what happened, but does not give a solution or fixation to the problem.

== Examples ==
Very few newspapers in 2006 claimed to have made money from their websites, which were mostly free to all viewers. Declining profit margins and declining circulation in daily newspapers forced executives to contemplate new methods of obtaining revenue from websites, without charging for the subscription. This has been difficult. Newspapers with specialized audiences such as The Wall Street Journal and The Chronicle of Higher Education successfully charge subscription fees. Most newspapers have an online edition, including the Los Angeles Times,The Washington Post, USA Today, Mid-Day, and The New York Times. Many European countries also have their own English-language online news, such as The Daily Slovak News (Slovakia), Helsinki Times (Finland) and The Moscow Times (Russian exiled media).

The Guardian experimented with new media in 2005, offering a free twelve-part weekly podcast series by Ricky Gervais. Another UK daily to go online is The Daily Telegraph.

In Australia, most major newspapers offer an online version, with or without a paywalled subscription option. In Algeria, the number of daily visitors of news websites and online editions of newspapers surpasses the number of daily readers of print newspapers since the end of 2016.

== Online-only newspapers ==
An online-only paper has no print-media connections. An example is the UK Southport Reporter, introduced in 2000—a weekly regional newspaper that is not produced or run in any format than 'soft-copy' on the Internet by its publishers, PCBT Photography. Another early example is "Bangla2000", also introduced in 2000, which was uploaded twice daily from Bangladesh and edited by Tukun Mahmud Nurul Momen.

Unlike the UK Southport Reporter, it was not a regional newspaper. Bangla2000.com ran international, economic, and sports news as well, simultaneously. The largest library of the world Library of Congress archived it subsequently. Unlike blog sites and other news websites, it is run as a newspaper and is recognized by media groups such as the NUJ and/or the IFJ. They fall under relevant press regulations and are signed up to the official UK press regulator Impress. allNovaScotia is an online newspaper based in Halifax, Nova Scotia, Canada that publishes business and political news six days a week. The website was the first online-only newspaper in Atlantic Canada and has been behind a paywall since starting in 2001.

Even print media is turning to online-only publication. As of 2009, the decrease of the traditional business model of print newspapers has led to various attempts to establish local, regional or national online-only newspapers - publications that do original reporting, rather than just commentary or summaries of reporting from other publications. An early major example in the U.S. is the Seattle Post-Intelligencer, which stopped publishing after 149 years in March 2009 and went online only. In Scotland, in 2010, Caledonian Mercury became Scotland's first online-only newspaper, with the same aims as Southport Reporter in the UK, with The Yorkshire Times the following suit and becoming Yorkshire's first online-only paper in 2011. The Independent ceased print publications in 2016, becoming the first British national newspaper to move to an online only format.

In the US, technology news websites such as CNET, TechCrunch, and ZDNet started as web publications and enjoy comparable readership to the conventional newspapers. Also, with the rising popularity of online media, veteran publications like the U.S. News & World Report are abandoning print and going online-only.

In October 2020, 11 online only news portals formed DIGIPUB News India foundation to encourage an ecosystem of Digital Only press.

== Trends ==
In 2015, 65% of people reported that print was their preferred method for reading a newspaper, down 4% from 2014. The methods people use to get their news from digital means was at 28%, as opposed to 20% of people attaining the news through print newspapers. These trends indicate an increase in digital consumption of newspapers, as opposed to print. Today, ad revenue for digital forms of newspapers is nearly 25%, while print is constituting the remaining 75%. Contrastingly, ad revenue for digital methods was 5% in 2006.

== Hybrid newspapers ==
Hybrid newspapers are predominantly focused on online content, but also produce a print form. Trends in online newspapers indicate publications may switch to digital methods, especially online newspapers in the future. The New York Times is an example of this model of the newspaper as it provides both a home delivery print subscription and a digital one as well. There are some newspapers which are predominantly online, but also provide limited hard copy publishing^{[11]} An example is annarbor.com, which replaced the Ann Arbor News in the summer of 2009. It is primarily an online newspaper, but publishes a hard copy twice a week.^{[12]} Other trends indicate that this business model is being adopted by many newspapers with the growth of digital media.

The turn to hybrid publishing models has been commensurate with the increasing importance of social media platforms to disseminate news, especially amongst 18-24 demographic.

== Use ==
In 2013, the Reuters Institute commissioned a cross-country survey on news consumption, and gathered data related to online newspaper use that emphasizes the lack of use of paid online newspaper services. The countries surveyed were France, Germany, Denmark, Spain, Italy, Japan, Brazil, the United States, and the United Kingdom. All samples within each country were nationally representative. Half of the sample reportedly paid for a print newspaper in the past 7 days, and only one-twentieth of the sample paid for online news in the past 7 days. That only 5% of the sample had recently paid for online newspaper access is likely because most people access news that is free. People with portable devices, like tablets or smartphones, were significantly more likely to subscribe to digital news content. Additionally, people aged between 25 and 34 are more willing to pay for digital news than older people across all countries. This is in line with the Pew Research Center's finding in a survey of U.S. Americans that the Internet is a leading source of news for people younger than 50.

== Popularity of online articles ==
Not all articles published online receive the same amount of attention; there are factors that determine their popularity. The number of times an article gets shared on social media is relevant for activists, politicians, authors, online-publishers and advertisers. They thus have an interest in knowing the number of shares, preferably even predicting it before the article is being published. With new methods of Natural Language Processing such as Latent Dirichlet allocation it is possible to gain insights into the core characteristics of an article.

A team of Portuguese scientists retrieved data from the website Mashable and made the dataset publicly available. Said "dataset about online news popularity". consists of 39,644 observations and 60 possible features, that have been collected over two years from 2013 to 2015. The features consist of variables describing words, links, digital media, time, keywords, insights from Natural Language Processing and the number of article shares. With the dataset being publicly available, a fair amount of data analysis has been conducted. Some can be found on the website "Kaggle". One "classification analysis". GitHub. 30 November 2020. used machine learning methods, namely, logistic regression, linear discriminant analysis, artificial neural networks and random forests to predict the top ten percent most frequently shared articles. The conclusion is, that the average keywords within an article and the average popularity of said keywords have the greatest impact on the amount of shares an article receives. Moreover, the amount of links to other articles and the closeness to the most relevant current topics are influencing the popularity of an article heavily. On the other hand, the day of publication is less important when it comes to predicting the popularity of the article.

== See also ==
- Computer magazine
- Digital media
- Electronic journalism
- History of French journalism
- Internet
- Internet radio
- Internet television
- Online magazine
- World Wide Web
- List of online newspaper archives
