= Southport Reporter =

UK online newspaper

The Southport & Mersey Reporter
- Type: Weekly newspaper
- Format: Online newspaper
- Owner: PBT Media Relations Ltd.
- Editor: Patrick Trollope
- Founded: 2000
- Political alignment: None
- Headquarters: Post Office Ave., Southport
- Website: southportreporter.com

Southport Reporter is an online newspaper started by Patrick Trollope. It was the UK's first online-only regional newspaper. It is based in Southport on Merseyside, and was quickly recognised by the National Union of Journalists as well as other media groups, authorities and organizations as a newspaper. This recognition was due to the fact it was only run by certificated professional journalists (often the journalist held NUJ or IFJ ID/certification). As a result, they had to follow and run under the rules of the UK Press Complaints Commission's Code of Practice and the NUJ Code of Conduct.

== Development history ==
The idea started when Patrick Trollope decided to use unpublished news as a single page on a website called Formby Online, run by Andy Johnson, over 1998 and 1999, after studying at Wolverhampton University. By 1999 the idea had grown into a multi-page system. In 1999 the site was moved onto his photographic business website, PCBT Photography. The interest shown during 1999 helped the idea develop quicker, but produced bandwidth restriction problems by the end of 1999. In 2000, the site was again moved to a new temporary host location, on a newly launched site called Southport.gb.com. The increase of visitors in 2000 helped the Southport Reporter to become better established. In 2001 the section was moved again and became fully independent, hosted as SouthportReporter.com. As it was by then becoming established, it was also registered as a trademark.

As the website became larger, it also began to be published under the names Mersey Reporter and Liverpool Reporter. By April 2002 Southport Reporter was starting to become known as Southport & Mersey Reporter, due to its coverage of news from all parts of Merseyside.

By then they had started covering events as far away as Manchester, with the paper covering the Manchester Commonwealth Games, on a local and international level. By 2007 the paper was being used as a news resource for many international media groups, like HULIQ. In 2008 the paper ran a Limited Company, called PBT Media Relations Ltd. Company UK. Also in 2008 the paper started to push for better rights for photographers in the UK.

After Liverpool's run as European Capital of Culture 2008, tourism was at an all-time high in the area, so by 2009, questions within the Merseyside's community were being asked about the city's next steps. As a result, it was not surprising that Southport & Mersey Reporter would be consulted on the city's future development, resulting in them becoming a media partner of the "Beyond Capital of Culture: A New Dawn for Tourism in Liverpool" event.

In October 2012, the online newspaper published a paperback book under the publishing name VAMPhire.com. Beyond The Book was printed as part of an event called "ScareFEST 3 – Beyond The Book" that took place in October 2016 in a town called Crosby in Merseyside (UK). The event showcased seven UK award-winning authors including those who were published in the book: Jon Mayhew, Tommy Donbavand, Barry Hutchison, Philip Caveney, Joseph Delaney and David Gatward. The book was illustrated by Sean Steele.

In 2013 the group started backing the Liverpool JCI as part of their aim to use the online paper to help development and improve the area's image.

IN 2014 the group was still leading the way as they started to get involved with the UK's first fully independent press regulation known as IMPRESS - the Independent Press Regulator. Southport Reporter and its connected websites became one of the first members of the new Regulator in 2016. This was a major step, resulting in PR from the likes of The Financial Times, the UK's Press Gazette and the UK's Guardian. This makes them fully regulated and lets them publish and display the 'IMPRESS Kitemark.'

In 2015 the site started putting a small logo up on its websites with the words "VAMPHire.com." They have mentioned this project a few times, but mystery surrounds it. The group has been very quiet on the development. A few items have popped up in recent years, including on sites including Manchester Fashion Week, London Calling, North Devon Gazette and Liverpool Express. It has also been mentioned on websites like The North West Bus Blog, Felicity Hat Hire, Google Chrome website and Vessel Finder. However, as of yet, other than photos and the fact that they own or run VAMPhire.com, the connection is still unclear. As they have a connection to book publishing via that name, this is worth keeping an eye on, as very little movement has taken place on some of the group's other websites. With all the developments on the Press Regulator side, some are asking what the next move will be for this group, who are also now going under the name PBT Media Relations Ltd.

== See also ==
- Formby Golf Club
- Liverpool
- Merseyside
- Southport
