= Kerry-Anne Mendoza =

British writer & activist (born 1981)

- Born: 13 June 1981 (age 45); Kingswood, South Gloucestershire, England
- Occupations: Writer, journalist, social commentator
- Spouse: Nancy Mendoza

Kerry-Anne Mendoza (born 13 June 1981) is an English writer, journalist and social commentator. She is the former editor-in-chief of The Canary, a left-wing new media outlet.

== Early life and education ==
Mendoza was brought up in Kingswood, near Bristol. She was educated at Kingsfield Secondary School, then started a history degree at the University of Sussex. After a fact-finding programme in Israel/Palestine in 2002 (during the Al-Aqsa Intifada, a Palestinian uprising against Israel), in which she witnessed an Israeli attack in the West Bank city of Ramallah, she withdrew from the university course. She later described her two visits to Palestine in 2002, and the Iraq War of 2003, as key moments in her "radicalisation into [a] social justice warrior".

== Career ==
Mendoza has been a project manager for high street banks and is a former management consultant in banking, local government and the NHS, who left her job to join the Occupy protest.

She co-founded The Canary in 2015, and is its first editor-in-chief.

Her book, Austerity: The Demolition of the Welfare State and the Rise of the Zombie Economy (ISBN 978-1-78026-246-8), was published in 2015.

She has written under "Scriptonite" on the Scriptonite Daily blog and has been a contributor for major news organisations such as The Guardian, openDemocracy, the New Internationalist and RT UK.

Since 2017, she has appeared on the BBC topical debate programmes Question Time and Any Questions?

In 2018, she was invited by the Black Members’ Council of the National Union of Journalists (NUJ) to give its annual Black History Month lecture in honour of Claudia Jones, to be held at the offices of The Guardian newspaper. However, many of that paper's journalists objected, due to The Canary's role in the detention and deportation of a Guardian freelancer, Carl David Goette-Luciak in Nicaragua, and the event did not go ahead.

Post Corbyn she returned to her first love of management consultancy at LXS.

== Views and social media ==
Politically, Mendoza was a staunch defender of Jeremy Corbyn's 2015–2019 tenure as Labour Party leader.

In January 2020, Mendoza was accused of comparing Brexit celebrations to Nazi Germany after suggesting, on Twitter, that Brexit celebrations could descend into a "21st century Kristallnacht". In August 2020, she was criticised for using, in another tweet, a slogan which appeared above the gates of some Nazi concentration camps: "Get Brexit done Build, build, build Jobs, jobs, jobs Arbeit macht frei". Explaining the second tweet, Mendoza told Jewish News (writing that the slogan appeared over the gates of Nazi death camps) that "the historical resonance of the phrase was the entire point", stating that "The replacement of meaningful political debate with propagandist slogans, alongside the demonisation of refugees and people seeking asylum should be a source of national shame for England." She also considered it "a compliment to be criticised by a Conservative MP helping drive that descent into fascism."

In autumn 2020, she joined the Welsh independence campaign YesCymru after moving to Wales. In February 2021 the group initiated an investigation into alleged antisemitism in relation to the tweet which made use of the phrase "Arbeit macht frei" to criticise Brexit. She stated that the allegations were "baseless" and part of a "right-wing smear campaign".

== Personal life ==
In 2010, Kerry-Anne formed a civil partnership with Nancy Mendoza. They live in the South Wales Valleys.
