= Peter Oborne =

British journalist and broadcaster (born 1957)

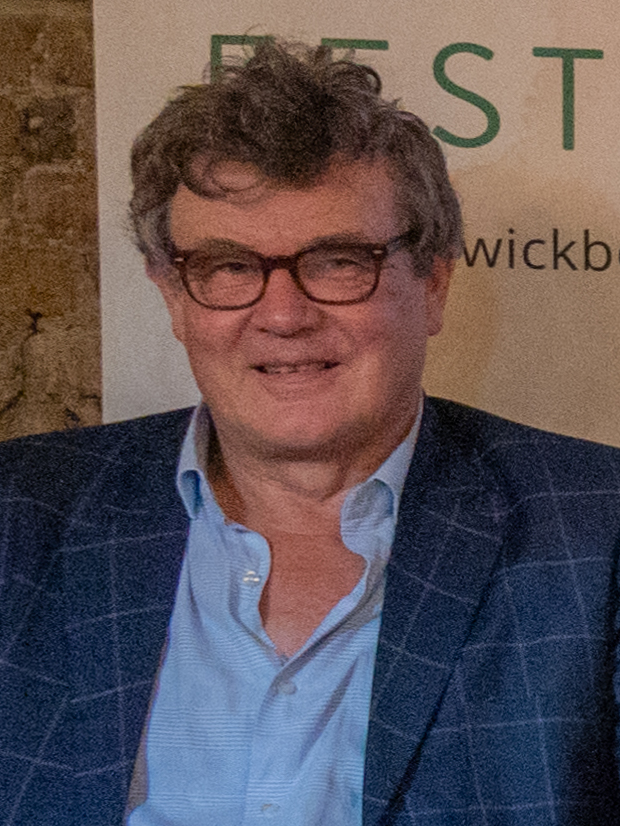
- Oborne at the 2024 Chiswick Book Festival
- Born: Peter Alan Oborne; 11 July 1957 (age 69); Poole, Dorset, England
- Education: Sherborne School; Christ's College, Cambridge
- Occupations: Journalist; author
- Political party: Conservative (until 2019) (Note: Despite being an admitted life-long Conservative voter, Oborne stated that he would not vote for the Conservatives in the 2019 election as they had turned away from their traditions and "...have become a vehicle for well-drilled fanatics who, like the Militant tendency forty years ago, infiltrate constituency parties in order to deselect MPs who offend doctrinal purity.")

Peter Alan Oborne (/ˈoʊbɔːrn/; born 11 July 1957) is a British journalist and broadcaster. He is the former chief political commentator of The Daily Telegraph, from which he resigned in early 2015. He is author of The Rise of Political Lying (2005), The Triumph of the Political Class (2007), and The Assault on Truth: Boris Johnson, Donald Trump and the Emergence of a New Moral Barbarism (2021), and along with Frances Weaver of the 2011 pamphlet Guilty Men. He has also authored a number of books about cricket. He writes a political column for Declassified UK, Double Down News, openDemocracy, Middle East Eye and a diary column for the Byline Times.

He sat as a commissioner for the Citizens Commission on Islam, Participation and Public Life. He won the Press Awards Columnist of the Year in 2012 and again in 2016.

== Biography ==
=== Early life and career ===
Oborne was educated at Sherborne School and read history at Christ's College, Cambridge, graduating with a BA (Note: A Cambridge BA automatically converts to an MA (Master of Arts) as long as certain conditions are satisfied. "The Cambridge MA". Cambridge University.) degree in 1978. After abandoning work on a doctorate, he joined NM Rothschild's corporate finance division in 1981, and stayed there for three years.

He began working for Robert Maxwell's now closed Financial Weekly magazine in 1985, being taken on by the editor Mihir Bose. In between two spells on the Evening Standard, the second being more extended, Oborne joined The Daily Telegraph in 1987 for what turned out to be five months. During his second period on the Standard, he was sent to Westminster in 1992 as a junior political journalist by Paul Dacre, then the Standard's editor. After moving to the Express titles in 1996, where he was taken on by Sue Douglas as a political commentator, he accepted voluntary redundancy in April 2001 at a time when the titles' new proprietor, Richard Desmond, was attempting to reduce losses.

Oborne is the author of a highly critical biography of Tony Blair's former spin doctor Alastair Campbell, published in 1999, and a biography of the cricketer Basil D'Oliveira (whose selection for England to tour South Africa in 1968 caused that country's apartheid regime to cancel the tour). Oborne is also a vocal critic of the late Zimbabwean president Robert Mugabe, and author of a pamphlet published by the Centre for Policy Studies about the situation in Zimbabwe, A Moral Duty to Act There.

=== From 2003 to 2006 ===
As a television journalist, Oborne made three polemical documentaries with filmmaker Paul Yule: Mugabe's Secret Famine (2003), Afghanistan – Here's One We Invaded Earlier (2004), and Not Cricket – The Basil D'Oliveira Conspiracy (2004). When the paperback of Oborne's book on the D'Oliveira affair, Basil D'Oliveira, Cricket and Conspiracy: The Untold Story was published in 2005, Owen Slot wrote in a review in The Times, that Oborne "sets it up beautifully: one gentle, conservative Cape Town coloured man versus apartheid at its most rabid, the odds stacked heavily against the former". Robin Marlar in The Sunday Times thought "the positives in this book have it by a mile, the good guys are praised, and the others revealed". The book was written with D'Oliveira's involvement and won the William Hill Sports Book of the Year award in 2004.

In an edition of the Channel 4 Dispatches programme in November 2004, "The Dirty Race for the White House", broadcast just before the re-election of George W. Bush, Oborne asserted: "This US presidential election is about using the darkest tools of political persuasion – fear, lies and black propaganda – in order to target an amazingly small but utterly decisive group of largely ignorant voters". The historian Andrew Roberts wrote in The Times that such claims by Oborne as the country's voters being "ignorant beyond belief" was a "staggeringly snobbish, anti-American generalisation" and that "it can hardly be blamed on the candidates that they engage the electorate in the vernacular in which they are best likely to be understood".

In April 2005, Oborne presented the Channel 4 programme in the Election Unspun series, "Why Politicians Can't Tell the Truth", that examined how major political parties in Britain allegedly pursue an agenda designed to appeal only to a narrow band of floating voters expected to play a decisive role in the UK general election of 2005. In a Dispatches episode broadcast in November 2005, "Iraq – The Reckoning", he commented that the 2003 invasion was "the greatest foreign policy disaster since Munich. And our Government has reacted in precisely the same way: by going into denial. Denial about the role our troops are really playing in Iraq. Denial about the true nature of the emerging Iraqi state. Above all, we're in denial about the fact that the invasion of Iraq, as conceived by President Bush and Tony Blair, has failed."

=== From 2006 to 2009 ===
In April 2006, it was announced that Oborne was taking up a new position at the Daily Mail as a political columnist, while retaining his connection with The Spectator as a contributing editor. He had been The Spectator's political editor since 2001, and was replaced in that role by Fraser Nelson of The Scotsman.

Oborne's book The Triumph of the Political Class was published in 2007. Simon Jenkins, in a review for The Sunday Times, summarised Oborne's thesis "in his latest diatribe against Britain's ingénue ruling class" as "Out have gone mandarins, independent advisers, political parties and ministers with experience of life. In has come a tight network of loyalist apparatchiks, quango-crats, lobbyists and City consultants" in the era of New Labour. Jenkins observed: "Amid all this sound and fury, it is sometimes hard to discern Oborne's real complaint from his aloof moralism. Much of what he attacks predates Blair". Oborne wrote some years later: "Blair falls into the tradition of [Robert] Walpole and [David] Lloyd George", who greatly enriched themselves in office, although Blair's "exploitation of the office of prime minister came after he left Downing Street".

In July 2008, Oborne presented another Dispatches programme made for Channel 4 called "It Shouldn't Happen to a Muslim". In this film and the accompanying leaflet Muslims Under Siege, co-written with television journalist James Jones, it was argued that the demonisation of Muslims has become widespread in British media and politics. The pamphlet was serialised in The Independent. In an October 2006 Guardian interview with James Silver, Oborne was against the "litany of condemnation" of Muslim women who wear the veil from government ministers and considered it an "anti-Islamic crusade". In his opinion, New Labour had "given up on the Muslim vote after the Iraq war, so it's now bashing Muslims to get back the white working-class vote and the veil row is a very carefully orchestrated political strategy".

Oborne was on the Orwell Prize's Journalism shortlist for 2009.

=== From 2009 to 2015 ===
==== Israel, the EU, and other issues ====
In collaboration with James Jones, Oborne wrote the pamphlet "The Pro-Israel Lobby in Britain", which outlined the alleged influence enjoyed by pro-Israeli media and political lobbyists in the United Kingdom. The article asserted that while the lobbying efforts of groups such as Conservative Friends of Israel (CFI), Labour Friends of Israel, and the Britain Israel Communications and Research Centre (BICOM) are within the law, their funding is often untraceable, their operations are not transparent, and media seldom declare the influence of junkets arranged by these pro-Israeli entities on the tenor of their writing. Oborne and Jones conclude that changes are needed "because politics in a democracy should never take place behind closed doors. It should be out in the open and there for all to see." On the same issue. Oborne wrote and presented an edition of Dispatches titled "Inside Britain's Israel Lobby", featuring interviews with people mentioned in the pamphlet and commenting on the BBC's refusal to broadcast the 2009 DEC appeal for Gaza. In December 2012, he argued that the Conservatives' unwillingness to criticise the Israeli government threatens the prospect of a permanent peace in the region.

In collaboration with Conservative Member of Parliament Jesse Norman, Oborne produced the pamphlet Churchill's Legacy – the Conservative case for the Human Rights Act in the summer of 2009. Published by Liberty, the pamphlet attempted to show how "the Act is not a charter for socialism but contains the most basic rights from 900 years of British history".

In September 2011, Oborne and Frances Weaver co-authored the pamphlet Guilty Men for the Centre for Policy Studies. According to Oborne and Weaver in a covering article, "the pro-Europeans find themselves in the same situation as appeasers in 1940, or communists after the fall of the Berlin Wall". The report sought to identify the politicians, institutions and commentators who the authors felt had tried to take Britain into the European single currency. The Financial Times, which "has been wrong on every single major economic judgment over the past quarter century", in the covering article is accused of a "vendetta" against Euro-sceptics. In the report, the FT, BBC and CBI are accused of being "villains" and considered the "propaganda arm for the pro-single currency movement". MacShane wrote that the authors made false claims in the report against the Confederation of British Industry (CBI) and he dismisses the idea that the British media "have been suborned into aiding and abetting a pro-Europe line" because the press is dominated by a right-wing euro-sceptic agenda.

Following the pamphlet's publication, Oborne made frank comments on the BBC programme Newsnight on 28 September 2011. In the debate about the Greek debt crisis and its effects on the eurozone, he referred to the European Commission spokesman Amadeu Altafaj Tardio as "that idiot in Brussels" which, after he used the phrase for a third time, resulted in Tardio walking out of the studio. (Tardio, spokesman for European Union economic and monetary affairs commissioner Olli Rehn, was speaking from a studio in Brussels.) Oborne was mocked by Newsnight presenter Jeremy Paxman for "gratuituous rudeness" after Paxman had himself asked for a response from "Mr Idiot in Brussels".

On 10 May 2012, on the BBC's Question Time programme, Oborne commented following the jailing of a Rochdale sex trafficking gang, who had been convicted of rape, sexual activity with children and conspiracy to engage in sexual activity with children having raped, physically assaulted and sexually groomed girls as young as 12. Oborne said the victims had "accepted the advances" of their attackers and added: "What does it tell us about what's happened to our society that we have 12 year old girls, 13 year old girls, who are happy to give up their affection and their beauty to men in exchange for a packet of crisps?" Some, such as Vicky Allan of The Herald, have claimed that this type of rhetoric amounts to victim blaming, saying that: "there is a prevalent conviction that young girls are somehow asking for whatever they get as soon as they begin to behave in a sexual manner, or choose to involve themselves with men".

Oborne has been critical of the state of Saudi Arabia–United Kingdom relations as he considers that Saudi Arabia has too much influence over British politicians' decisions due to the value of arms they buy from British-headquartered companies like BAE Systems. In October 2014, his Daily Telegraph column criticised the British government for launching an investigation into the Muslim Brotherhood, apparently on the say-so of the Saudi Arabian government and the Arab lobby. On the Arab lobby, he said: "Unlike the Pro-Israel lobby (with which it is, nevertheless, very closely allied) there are few obvious institutional structures or pressure points. The British Arab lobby is inchoate. It is powerfully represented at the heart of the British military and intelligence establishments, while its connections with the oil and defence industries remain profound. Relations with the British monarchy run very deep." He also called on the British government to end its support for the Saudi Arabian-led intervention in Yemen.

==== A Dangerous Delusion: Why the Iranian Nuclear Threat is a Myth ====
Written with David Morrison, Oborne's book A Dangerous Delusion: Why the Iranian Nuclear Threat is a Myth (2013) sought to dispel what the authors see as a common misconception of a malign intent behind Iran's nuclear power programme, and objects to the current sanctions against Iran and argues against any military intervention. The Times leader writer Oliver Kamm disagreed with the authors' notion that Ayatollah Khomeini was "one of the greatest theologians of all time" whose "teaching contained insights that went far deeper than anything the rationalists and materialists of the United States could imagine" suggesting those insights fall somewhat short of the proposals of Thomas Jefferson in the Virginia Statute for Religious Freedom. On a podcast involving the authors, Douglas Murray asserted that Morrison, with the acquiescence of Oborne, made disingenuous claims about President Ahmadinejad's history of Holocaust denial.

Oborne, responding to his critics in an article for The Spectator's 'Coffee House' blog, complained of the "scale and (in some cases) virulence that I have never encountered before" of his and Morrison's opponents. He rejected Kamm and Murray's claims about his co-author, who "fully accepts" the veracity of claims against Ahmadinejad. Oborne wrote that "not one of our critics have even tried to deal with the central, factual points of our short book: that Iran isn’t in possession of nuclear weapons and isn’t building them". Michael Axworthy thought that "For the most part, Oborne and Morrison are right and their arguments are strong". A review by Con Coughlin for The Jewish Chronicle speculated that Oborne's "unhappy descent into the world of international fantasy" owed much to his association with Morrison, and accused the authors of "alarming ignorance about the rudimentary principles that underpin the current Iranian regime" and reports from intelligence sources and the International Atomic Energy Agency.

==== Resignation from The Daily Telegraph ====
Oborne had re-joined The Daily Telegraph in May 2010 from the Mail to write for the newspaper from the following September.

On 17 February 2015, Oborne resigned from The Daily Telegraph. In a letter posted to the online news website, openDemocracy, Oborne criticised his former employer for the allegedly unscrupulous relationship between their editorial and commercial arms. Specifically, Oborne outlined how the paper would suppress negative stories and drop investigations into the HSBC bank, a major source of their advertising revenue, which, in his opinion, compromised their journalistic integrity calling it a "form of fraud on its readers". He also alleged that The Telegraph's coverage of stories relating to British supermarket chain Tesco, shipping company Cunard and the pro-democracy protests in Hong Kong had been influenced by commercial considerations. He added, "There are other very troubling cases, many of them set out in Private Eye, which has been a major source of information for Telegraph journalists wanting to understand what is happening on their paper".

The Telegraph group responded to Oborne's claims in a statement: "We aim to provide all our commercial partners with a range of advertising solutions, but the distinction between advertising and our award-winning editorial operation has always been fundamental to our business. We utterly refute any allegation to the contrary."

Michael White wrote of Oborne at the time: "What makes him unusual, however, not just among journalists, is his powerful sense of right and wrong".

=== Career from 2015 ===
In July 2015, BBC Radio 4 broadcast a report by Oborne in which he and producer Anna Meisel investigated the closure a year earlier of HSBC bank accounts belonging to British Muslim institutions and individuals. He had originally begun his investigation whilst working for The Daily Telegraph, but the newspaper had refused to publish the resultant article, which had been critical of the bank's decision, triggering his decision to resign.

On 30 June 2015, it was announced that Oborne would rejoin the Daily Mail with a weekly political column starting in the autumn and write a weekly column in Middle East Eye.

During the nomination process for the 2016 United States presidential election, Oborne said that, while Hillary Clinton "for me is a warmonger" as "[t]here's never been a war she hasn't supported", the eventual US President Donald Trump "in terms of his foreign policy is actually quite sensible. He doesn't want to get involved." In his opinion, the Russian government under Vladimir Putin and several other governments in the world have "been converted into a form of pillage by a ruling family, individual or ruling elite".

Though previously a "strong Brexiter", Oborne wrote an article for the UK-based political website openDemocracy on 7 April 2019, and suggested that the Brexit decision needs to be rethought: "So I argue, as a Brexiteer, that we need to take a long deep breath. We need to swallow our pride, and think again. Maybe it means rethinking the Brexit decision altogether."

In October 2019, Oborne wrote an article about how journalists and the media are being used by Downing Street to get their false news out, saying: "It's chilling. From the Mail, The Times to the BBC and ITN, everyone is peddling Downing Street's lies and smears. They're turning their readers into dupes." The article was rejected by The Daily Mail, The Spectator, and Channel 4's Dispatches, and Oborne published it on openDemocracy. Oborne said: "This article marked the end of my thirty-year-long career as a writer and broadcaster in the mainstream British press and media. I had been a regular presenter on Radio 4's The Week in Westminster for more than two decades. It ceased to use me, without explanation. I parted company on reasonably friendly terms with the Daily Mail after our disagreement." In an interview with Channel 4 News, he said that the journalists being used by the UK government include BBC News's Laura Kuenssberg and ITV News's Robert Peston.

In 2021, Oborne's book The Assault on Truth: Boris Johnson, Donald Trump and the Emergence of a New Moral Barbarism was published by Simon & Schuster. The book examines the measures taken by Boris Johnson and his ministers in order to win the 2019 United Kingdom general election and force through Brexit. Reviewing the book for The Guardian, William Davies wrote that "Oborne is clinical and merciless in his account of Johnson's mendacity, building up his case item by item, footnote by footnote."

In March 2024, Oborne featured in Channel 4's The Rise and Fall of Boris Johnson.

In June 2026, Zeteo announced that Oborne would be joining their new UK offshoot, Zeteo UK.

== Personal life ==
Oborne describes himself as a "regular Anglican churchgoer", and his wife, Martine, was the vicar at St Michael's Sutton Court in Chiswick, west London. The couple have five children. Martine Oborne is also a writer and illustrator. Peter is a friend of Craig Murray, whom he described as "one of the greatest truth-tellers of our time".

== Awards and honours ==
- 2004: William Hill Sports Book of the Year, Basil D’Oliveira
- 2005: British Sports Book Awards (Best Biography), Basil D’Oliveira
- 2012: Society of Editors Press Awards Columnist of the Year (Broadsheet)
- 2015: Wisden Book of the Year, Wounded Tiger: A History of Cricket in Pakistan
- 2016: Society of Editors Press Awards Columnist of the Year (POP)

== Works ==
=== Books and pamphlets ===
- Oborne, Peter (1999). Alastair Campbell: New Labour and the Rise of the Media Class. Aurum. ISBN 978-1-85410-647-6.
- Oborne, Peter (2003). A Moral Duty to Act There. Centre for Policy Studies. ISBN 978-1-903219-51-5.
- Oborne, Peter (2004). Basil D'Oliveira: Cricket and Controversy: The Untold Story. Little, Brown. ISBN 978-0-3167-2572-9.
  - paperback reprint: Time Warner, 2005. ISBN 978-0-7515-3488-7
- Oborne, Peter (2005). The Rise of Political Lying. Free Press. ISBN 978-0-7432-7560-6.
- Oborne, Peter (2007). The Triumph of the Political Class. Simon and Schuster. ISBN 978-0-7432-9527-7.
- Oborne, Peter; Jones, James (2008). Muslims Under Siege: Alienating Vulnerable Communities. Channel 4 Dispatches & Democratic Audit. Human Rights Centre, University of Essex.
- Oborne, Peter (2006). The Use and Abuse of Terror: The Construction of a False Narrative on Domestic Terror Threat. Centre for Policy Studies. ISBN 1-905389-22-1.
- The Pro-Israel Lobby in Britain (co-written with James Jones). Channel 4 Dispatches & Open Democracy, 2009
- The Children that Britain Betrayed. (Co-written with Lynn Ferguson) Channel 4 Dispatches,
- Guilty Men (co-written with Frances Weaver). Centre for Policy Studies, 2011
- Oborne, Peter; Norman, Jesse (2009). Churchill's Legacy: The Conservative Case for the Human Rights Act. Liberty. ISBN 978-0-946088-56-0.
- Oborne, Peter; Morrison, David (2013). A Dangerous Delusion: Why the West are Wrong about Nuclear Iran. Elliott & Thompson. ISBN 978-1-908739-89-6.
- Oborne, Peter (2014). Wounded Tiger: The History of Cricket in Pakistan. Simon and Schuster. ISBN 978-1-4711-2577-5.
- Oborne, Peter (2016). Not the Chilcot Report. Head of Zeus. ISBN 978-1-78497-796-2.
- Oborne, Peter; Heller, Richard (2016). White on Green: Celebrating the Drama of Pakistan Cricket. Simon and Schuster. ISBN 978-1-4711-5641-0.
- Oborne, Peter; Roberts, Tom (2017). How Trump Thinks: His Tweets and the Birth of a New Political Language. Head of Zeus. ISBN 978-1-7866-9665-6.
- Oborne, Peter (2021). The Assault on Truth: Boris Johnson, Donald Trump and the Emergence of a New Moral Barbarism. Simon and Schuster. ISBN 978-1-3985-0100-3.
- Oborne, Peter (2022). The Fate of Abraham: Why the West is Wrong About Islam. Simon and Schuster. ISBN 978-1-3985-0102-7.
- Oborne, Peter (2025). Complicit: Britain's Role in the Destruction of Gaza. OR Books. ISBN 978-1682194263.

=== Radio and television documentaries ===
- Mugabe's Secret Famine (Channel 4, May 2003, produced by Paul Yule, Juniper TV)
- Afghanistan: Here's One We Invaded Earlier (Channel 4, May 2003, produced by Paul Yule, Juniper TV)
- Not Cricket: The Basil D'Oliveira Conspiracy (Channel 4, June 2004, produced by Paul Yule, Berwick Universal Pictures)
- The Dirty Race for the White House (Channel 4, November 2004, produced by Ed Braman, Juniper TV)
- We’re All Criminals Now (Channel 4, January 2005, produced by Zoe Hassid, Mentorn in association with Raw TV)
- Election Unspun: Why Politicians Can't Tell the Truth (Channel 4, April 2005, produced by Richard Sanders, Juniper TV)
- Dispatches: Gordon Brown – Fit for Office? (Channel 4, May 2007, directed by Simon Berthon)
- Dispatches: Iraq – the Betrayal (Channel 4, March 2008, produced by Marc Perkins, October Films)
- Dispatches: It Shouldn't Happen to a Muslim (Channel 4, July 2008, produced by Chris Boulding, Quicksilver Media)
- Dispatches: Iraq – the Legacy (Channel 4, December 2008, Richard Sanders, October Films)
- Afghanistan: Waiting for the Taliban (Channel 4, May 2009, produced by Alex Nott, Quicksilver Media)
- Philippines: Holy Warriors (Channel 4, October 2009, produced by George Waldrum, Quicksilver Media)
- Dispatches: Iraq – the Reckoning (Channel 4, July 2009, directed by James Brabazon, Juniper TV)
- Dispatches: The Children Britain Betrayed (Channel 4, July 2009, produced by Lynn Ferguson, First Frame TV)
- Dispatches: Inside Britain's Israel Lobby (Channel 4, November 2009, Produced by Ed Harriman, Hardcash Productions)
- Conserving What? (Radio 4, October 2009, produced by Sheila Cook)
- Nigeria's Killing Fields (Channel 4, April 2010, produced by Andy Wells, Quicksilver Media)
- Tabloids, Tories and Telephone Hacking (Channel 4, October 2010, produced by Sally Brindle and Jenny Evans, Blakeway Productions)
- Pakistan: After the Floods (Channel 4, November 2010, directed by Simon Phillips, Quicksilver Media)
- Pakistan: Defenders of Karachi (Channel 4, April 2011, directed by Edward Watts, Quicksilver Media)
- Dispatches: The Wonderful World of Tony Blair (Channel 4, September 2011, directed by James Brabazon, Blast!)
- Libya: My Week with Gunmen (Channel 4, June 2012, directed by Richard Cookson, Quicksilver Media)
- Dispatches: Murdoch, Cameron & the £8 Billion Deal (Channel 4, June 2012, Blakeway Productions)
- HSBC, Muslims and Me (BBC Radio 4, July 2015, produced by Anna Meisel)
- Peter Oborne's Chilcot Report (BBC Radio 4, October 2015, produced by Hannah Barnes)
- Al Qaeda in Syria (BBC Radio 4, December 2015, produced by Joe Kent)
- All Out In Pakistan (BBC World, May 2017, directed by Paul Yule, Berwick Universal Pictures)
- Oborne and Heller on Cricket (Chiswick Calendar, 2020–2023, podcast)

== See also ==
- Politico-media complex (PMC)

== Notes ==
Preceded by Tom Bower	William Hill Sports Book of the Year winner 2004	Succeeded by Gary Imlach
