= Independent Football Regulator =

Public body promoting English football

The Independent Football Regulator (IFR) is a non-departmental public body of the Department for Culture, Media and Sport and is responsible for protecting and promoting the sustainability of English football.

== History ==
The IFR was first recommended as part of a fan-led review, and following the passing of the Football Governance Act 2025, it was created in September 2025. It was given powers to oversee the top five divisions in men's football in England. The aims of the IFR included improving financial sustainability within football, as well as preventing English clubs joining breakaway competitions, such as the European Super League in 2021.

=== Actions ===
In July 2026, the IFR warned National League North side Morecambe after it failed to respond to requests about the running of the club - the first IFR action since the Football Governance Act came into force. In August 2026, the club and its owners were officially reprimanded by the IFR "for failing to provide a timely and complete response to information requirements".

== Club licensing ==
Under the Football Governance Act 2025, every club operating a team in a specified competition is required to hold an operating licence issued by the IFR. The specified competitions currently comprise the top five tiers of English men's professional football: the Premier League, the Championship, League One, League Two and Step 1 of the National League, covering 116 clubs in total.

The licensing framework operates in two stages. A club first applies for a provisional operating licence, which is valid for up to three years. The IFR must grant a provisional licence if it is satisfied that the club would, when licensed, comply with the mandatory licence conditions. A full operating licence may subsequently be granted once the IFR is satisfied that the club is well-run, complies consistently with the mandatory conditions, and has no owners or officers who have been determined unsuitable.

Schedule 5 of the Act requires the IFR to attach four mandatory conditions to every operating licence. The first is a financial plans condition, under which clubs must submit, annually update and act in accordance with a financial plan covering funding sources, revenue and expenditure projections, and stress-tested cashflow forecasts. The second is a corporate governance statement condition, requiring clubs to submit, publish online and regularly update a statement explaining how they are applying the IFR's Football Club Corporate Governance Code. The third is a fan consultation condition, requiring regular consultation with elected fan representatives on matters including the club's business priorities, heritage assets such as its name, crest and home ground, and matchday issues including ticket prices. The fourth is an annual declaration condition, under which clubs must annually certify all matters notifiable to the IFR during the preceding twelve months, or confirm that no such matters arose.

The full application window for provisional licences opened in November 2026 and closed in February 2027. Every regulated club was required to hold at least a provisional operating licence to compete from the 2027–28 season. Operating a team in a specified competition without a licence constitutes a relevant infringement under the Act. Under Schedule 9 of the Act, the IFR has the power to publish censure statements, appoint skilled persons at a club's cost to assist remediation, and impose financial penalties of up to 10% of total club revenue for relevant infringements.

== Owners, Directors and Senior Executives regime ==
The Owners, Directors and Senior Executives (ODSE) regime was established under the Football Governance Act 2025 and came into full effect on 5 May 2026. The regime requires that no person may become an owner of a regulated club, and no individual may take up a Senior Management Function at a regulated club, without the IFR first determining them to be suitable. The regime is suspensory in nature: a prospective owner may not complete an acquisition, and a prospective senior manager may not take up their post, while an application remains pending.

The definition of an owner under Schedule 1 of the Act is framed on a substance-over-form basis. An individual qualifies as an owner if they hold, directly or indirectly, more than 25% of the shares or voting rights in a club, hold the right to appoint or remove a director or senior manager, or exercise significant influence or control over the club's activities. The definition applies regardless of whether interests are held through corporate structures, offshore vehicles or nominees.

The IFR has defined six Senior Management Functions under its rulemaking powers. These are: Chair (SMF1), Chief Executive (SMF2), Chief Finance (SMF3), Chief Operations (SMF4), Director (SMF5), and Other Key Decision Maker (SMF6). Roles are assessed by reference to their actual responsibilities rather than job title. SMF6 is a catch-all function intended to capture individuals exercising a high degree of decision-making authority over a club's regulated activities who do not fall within SMF1 to SMF5.

When assessing the suitability of a prospective owner, the IFR considers three criteria: honesty and integrity, including criminal history and regulatory or disciplinary action in any jurisdiction; financial soundness, including personal insolvency history and the financial track record of organisations the individual has controlled; and whether the applicant has any source of wealth connected to serious criminal conduct. Under section 28(4)(b) of the Act, if the IFR has grounds to suspect such a connection, it must refuse the application. For Senior Management Function applicants, the IFR additionally assesses requisite competence by reference to qualifications, experience and training relevant to the role. The IFR has a statutory window of 90 days from receipt of a complete application to make a determination, extendable to 150 days in exceptional circumstances.

The IFR maintains a public register of ODSE determinations, which it updates on a weekly basis. Becoming an owner or senior manager of a regulated club without prior IFR approval constitutes a relevant infringement under the Act and may result in enforcement action, including financial penalties of up to 10% of total club revenue and, where an individual is found unsuitable following a retrospective assessment, the issuance of removal directions.
