= Impress (regulator) =

Independent press regulator in the UK

Impress: The Independent Monitor for the Press CIC
- Abbreviation: Impress
- Formation: 2013; 13 years ago
- Founder: Jonathan Heawood
- Key people: Lexie Kirkconnell-Kawana (chief executive)
- Website: www.impressorg.com

Impress: The Independent Monitor for the Press CIC (formerly stylised as IMPRESS) is an independent press regulator in the UK. It was the first to be recognised by the Press Recognition Panel. Impress regulates over 200 titles, consisting of a variety of independent local, investigative and special interest news publications across the UK. No national newspaper has signed up to the new regulator; most continue to be members of the unrecognised IPSO. Its founder is Jonathan Heawood and its current Chief Executive is Lexie Kirkconnell-Kawana.

== Background ==
In Spring 2011, News International began publicly admitting liability and paying compensation to people whose phone voicemail the News of the World had listened to. This resulted in the withdrawal of advertising from the News of the World and its ceasing publication.

Lord Leveson, a senior judge, was appointed in 2011 to conduct an inquiry into the "culture, practices and ethics of the press."

In 2012 Lord Leveson issued a report that recommended replacing the old Press Complaints Commission (PCC). The Leveson Report recommended that if a new, voluntary regulatory body were to comply with a list of requirements set out in the report then litigants should be encouraged to seek redress through procedures provided by such a body: Leveson's mechanism (which was later incorporated in Section 40 of the Crime and Courts Act 2013) was that when a recognised, compliant body had been established, with a dispute resolution mechanism, then if a complainant instead brought an action in the courts, not through the new body, neither side could be awarded any costs in the court action, even if they were to win. To determine whether any proposed complaints body complies with the Leveson criteria, the Press Recognition Panel (PRP) was established.

"The Press Recognition Panel (PRP) is an independent body set up to ensure that any organisation which regulates the press is independent, properly funded and able to protect the public, while recognising the important role carried out by the press."

On 8 September 2014, the Independent Press Standards Organisation (IPSO) was established by the major newspapers. It declined to pursue recognition from the Press Recognition Panel. Other newspapers, such as The Guardian, The Independent and the Financial Times, avoided IPSO, each choosing their own system of self-regulation. In 2016, an external review by former civil servant, Sir Joseph Pilling, found IPSO "largely compliant" with the recommendations of the Leveson Inquiry.

In 2013, a new group was formed by free speech advocate Jonathan Heawood called IMPRESS, intended to be a body fully compliant with the recommendations of Leveson. In 2015, a charity, the Independent Press Regulation Trust (IPRT), agreed to provide £3.8 million in funding to IMPRESS over the next four years, with the IPRT's funding guaranteed by Max Mosley's Alexander Mosley Charitable Trust. Sir Harry Evans also supported the initiative. By January 2016, IMPRESS had signed up a dozen publishers and applied for recognition by the Press Recognition Panel. By October 2016, it regulated around 40 specialist and local publishers.

== History ==
On 25 October 2016, Impress became the UK's first officially recognised press regulator after its application for Royal Charter recognition was granted. The recognition was backed by campaign groups such as Hacked Off, Article 19 the National Union of Journalists (NUJ), but opposed by all of the major national and regional print newspapers who had established their own organizations including the Independent Press Standards Organisation that has less independence from industry.

Impress has been rejected by all the big national titles plus most of the regional papers. IPSO, with the help of the News Media Association – which represents many of the largest IPSO members - requested a 'judicial review' on the grounds that “That is not what Leveson or those drafting the Charter intended.” On 12 October 2017, the High Court rejected the arguments. In April 2018, the News Media Association (NMA) appealed against the Press Regulation Panel's decision to award IMPRESS the status of recognised regulator. In January 2019, the NMA abandoned its appeal against the Judicial Review ruling.

Impress is as of 2025 the only regulatory body recognised by the Press Recognition Panel. The Conservative and Unionist Manifesto for the 2017 general election pledged to repeal Section 40, but this has not been done, so there remains a possibility that Section 40 may be activated. As of 2016, the government had declined to implement Section 40, with the Culture Secretary Karen Bradley describing it as a threat to a “vibrant free local press”.

Impress arbitrators are appointed by the Chartered Institute of Arbitrators.

In July 2017, in its first libel arbitration case, it ordered Byline Media to pay freelance journalist Dennis Rice £2,500 over tweets about him. In May 2018, it ordered the blog Evolve Politics to pay £900 in damages over an article wrongly claiming a Sky News broadcaster attended a Presidents Club dinner.

In September 2017, an Impress internal review concluded that some of its senior board members - Heaward, Emma Jones (former editor of Smash Hits magazine and deputy editor of the Sun's showbiz column Bizarre) and Máire Messenger Davies (emerita professor of media studies at Ulster University) - breached its own standards by appearing to be biased against a number of newspapers; it recommended they step down from the Board. Impress subsequently created a sub-committee excluding the three, to deal with any complaints relating to larger media companies. In November 2017, Jones and Messenger Davies were recused from the investigation of complaints about the Impress-regulated blog The Canary and its reporting on BBC politics editor Laura Kuenssberg after they shared tweets attacking her. In December 2017, it ruled that The Canary had breached its standards code by making false claims about Kuenssberg. In November 2017, founder member the Caerphilly Observer quit Impress due to concerns over transparency.

In February 2018, Max Mosley initiated legal action using data protection laws against The Sun for its reporting on his funding ties to Impress. Further controversy over Mosley in March 2018 led to members considering their ties to the regulator.

In July 2018, Impress extended the scope of its arbitration scheme to include civil claims for breaches of the Data Protection Act. By this time it was regulating 109 titles and had received five applications for arbitration and published two arbitration awards, relating to Evolve Politics and Byline Media.

In November 2018, Impress ruled against the blog Skwawkbox for breaching standards in its reporting on Wes Streeting MP. Streeting had complained to Impress after initially threatening on social media to sue Skwawkbox for its reporting of alleged abuse of black Labour MP Diane Abbott, with the site responding that it stood by its article. The complaint upheld was that the publishers did not take all reasonable steps to ensure accuracy, because Streeting had only been given four hours to respond to the blog's enquiry, a decision reached despite evidence that Streeting had been active on social media at the time. The panel did not make a judgment on the factual accuracy of the Skwawkbox article, stating that "The Committee was not in a position to test the veracity of the evidence provided by the Publisher".

On 26 March 2019, Impress was reconfirmed as the UK's approved, independent press regulator by the Press Recognition Panel (PRP). The PRP clarified that "This means that, amongst other things, Impress is independent of the print and online publishers it regulates, is appropriately funded, and has systems in place to protect the public."

As of 2025, IMPRESS was still the only approved independent self-regulator overseeing 231 publications.

== Notable members ==
Impress regulates more than 100 publishers, publishing over 200 publications across the UK.

As of 2021 the following publications were members:

- A Little Bit of Stone
- Bath Echo
- Bedford Independent
- Boundless
- Brixton Blog
- Brixton Bugle
- Bywire News, whose partners include Byline Times, The Canary, Labour Buzz, Not the News, Business Wales, Our.London, and Media Reform Coalition (MRC)
- The Canary
- The Conversation UK
- CommonSpace
- DeSmog
- Evolve Politics
- Formby Reporter
- Gedling Eye
- Hillbers News
- Isle of Wight Observer
- Left Foot Forward
- Lincolnshire Business magazine
- Liverpool Reporter
- London Daily
- Mersey Reporter
- My Turriff
- New Internationalist
- Novara Media
- Now Then magazine
- Plant Based News
- Shetland News
- Shropshire Live
- Skwawkbox
- South Molton News
- Southport Reporter
- Star and Crescent
- The Ferret
- The Lincolnite
- The Week In
- VIEWdigital
- View Magazine
- Vocalise
- Waltham Forest Echo
- Your Harlow
- Your Thurrock

== See also ==
- Mass media regulation § United Kingdom
- List of newspapers in the United Kingdom
