= Left Foot Forward =

British political website

- Website type: Blog
- Creator: Will Straw
- Editors: Josiah Mortimer, Basit Mahmood
- Revenue: £70,000 (donors 2011)
- Website: leftfootforward.org
- Commercial: No
- Launched: 2009
- Current status: Active

Left Foot Forward (LFF) is a left-wing political news and comment site in the UK, established in 2009. Its creator, Will Straw, the son of Alice Perkins and Jack Straw, edited the newspaper until December 2010.

Straw was succeeded by Shamik Das, who was succeeded in February 2013 by James Bloodworth, then in February 2016 by Niamh Ní Mhaoileoin. In June 2017, Josiah Mortimer took over as Editor. In 2020, Joe Lo joined as co-editor, before being replaced by former Newsweek journalist Basit Mahmood in May 2021.

The site is part of a cohort of British left-wing blogs which attracted interest from the media in 2010 and 2011.

In January 2014, the charity Oxfam cancelled an event at the East London Mosque after Left Foot Forward made the charity aware of the profile of one of its headline speakers, Ibrahim Hewitt, who had written a book for GCSE students calling homosexuality a "great sin", and saying that gay people should be "severely punished" under Islamic law.

In 2016, Left Foot Forward described itself as "progressive" and "in agreement with left of centre policies and politicians".

In 2018, a not-for-profit co-operative called Political Pixel started supporting the operation of Left Foot Forward, alongside other left-wing blogs LabourList and Political Scrapbook. In 2020, Left Foot Forward became independent of Political Pixel.

In March 2018, Left Foot Forward joined Parliament's Press Gallery to report from Parliament and the outlet joined the state-approved press regulator Impress in January 2019. LFF was one of the outlets which questioned government ministers during the daily COVID-19 press conferences in April 2020.

Contributing editors to the site include accounting professor Prem Sikka, former Green Party leader Natalie Bennett, and Unite the Union Assistant General Secretary Tony Burke.

== See also ==
- ConservativeHome
- The Canary (website)
- Guido Fawkes
- Political Scrapbook
