= Lim Hyun-ju =

South Korean television presenter

- Born: 27 April 1985 (age 40); South Korea
- Occupation: Television presenter
- Spouse: Daniel Tudor (m. 2023)
- Children: 2

Korean name
- Hangul: 임현주
- RR: Im Hyeonju
- MR: Im Hyŏnju
- Website: Lim Hyun-ju on Facebook

Lim Hyun-ju (Korean: 임현주; born 27 April 1985) is a South Korean television presenter and media personality.

In 2018, Lim became the first Korean news presenter to wear glasses on air after she delivered the morning news program MBC News Today wearing glasses.

In 2020, she reignited the bra-free debate by going on air without a bra after she appeared on a MBC documentary program Series M - Do We Need to Wear Bras and shared information and her feelings about the experiment via the social media platform.

== Personal life ==
On October 13, 2022, Lim announced she would marry British journalist Daniel Tudor. The couple held a wedding ceremony on February 24, 2023, after registering their marriage on February 14, 2023.

On April 27, 2023, Lim announced she was pregnant. Lim gave birth to a daughter on October 2, 2023. On September 3, 2024, Lim announced her second pregnancy. Lim gave birth to a second daughter on February 12, 2025.

== See also ==
- Daniel Tudor (journalist)
