= Peter Jukes =

British writer (born 1960)

- Born: 13 October 1960 (age 65); Swindon, Wiltshire, England
- Education: Queens' College, Cambridge
- Alma mater: Aylesbury Grammar School
- Occupation: Writer
- Years active: 1980s–present
- Known for: Author, screenwriter, playwright, literary critic, blogger
- Website: www.peterjukes.com

Peter Jukes (born 13 October 1960) is an English author, screenwriter, playwright, literary critic and journalist. He is the co-founder and executive editor of Byline Times.

== Early life ==
Jukes was born in Swindon, Wiltshire, England, and attended Queens' College, Cambridge. His mother was the daughter of a man fleeing the Armenian genocide; she was later adopted by his grandfather. His paternal grandfather was the comic book artist John Jukes.

== Television ==
Jukes' television writing has mainly been in the genre of prime time thrillers or TV detective fiction, with 90-minute or two-hour long stories being broadcast by the BBC.

Jukes devised and wrote most of the three seasons of the BBC One prime time undercover thriller In Deep starring Nick Berry and Stephen Tompkinson; two 90-minute film length episodes of the BBC One series The Inspector Lynley Mysteries;. Burn Out, the two-hour first episode of the first season of the Emmy Award winning cold case series Waking the Dead; achieved 8.4m viewers and a 38% share. He and Ed Whitmore wrote the second series of the paranormal/science thriller Sea of Souls which won the 2005 BAFTA Scotland Award for Best Drama. Jukes' opening episode of the third season of Holby City was described by The Guardian as the "televisual equivalent of Crack Cocaine."

In October 2009, Jukes wrote a critical piece for Prospect magazine, contrasting the standards of UK television drama negatively with the standard of television dramas in America. In the essay Why Can't Britain Do the Wire he argued that high-quality drama in the UK had suffered from a concentration of commissioning power, the dominance of soaps (such as the twelfth series of Holby City), and the lack of show runners or writer producers that characterise US TV drama production.

== Radio ==
His radio credits include the original BBC Radio Soul Motel (2008) (a drama taking place entirely in social networking space similar to Bebo or Facebook) and, with the comedian and actor Lenny Henry, the plays Bad Faith and Slavery: The Making of. The latter formed part of the BBC's 2007 programming series to commemorate 200 years since Britain abolished the slave trade, "managed to extract maximum humour from the grimmest of subject matters", by using the form of a semi-comic mockumentary. As The Spectator magazine explained: "Greg Wise plays the harassed producer trying to put together a drama for which Lenny Henry has provided sheafs of research printouts from the internet – but no script... 'Whose story is this?' demands Adrian Lester in an angry exchange with Brian Blessed. Were they in character? Or were they arguing for real?"

In 2008, Henry starred in another "dark comedy" by Jukes called Bad Faith: "Imagine the movie Bad Lieutenant transplanted to Birmingham, with Harvey Keitel's morally bankrupt copper replaced by Lenny Henry as a police chaplain who has lost his faith, and you have Peter Jukes's black comedy". Paul Donovan of The Sunday Times called Bad Faith "the best radio drama I have heard in ages, and clearly destined to become a series". In February 2010, three further episodes were broadcast on BBC Radio 4. to more positive reviews: "The scripts are strong, taut, bang up-to-the-minute, salted with ironic humour. (Lenny Henry's) performance is brilliant" according to Gillian Reynolds in The Daily Telegraph, and according to The Stage:

"Jukes' writing is terrific – funny, deep, unafraid to move from the mundane to the reflective. Jake, his semi-heretical minister, is the most original creation of his kind that I can recall and Henry was born to play him.".

== Non-fiction ==
Jukes's book A Shout in the Street was published by Faber and Faber in the UK in 1990, and by Farrar, Straus and Giroux and the University of California Press in the US. This "unusual but addictive book" (according to The Washington Post) is a series of essays and montages about modernity and city life, centred on London, Paris, Saint Petersburg and New York City. The Journal of Sociology compared the book favourably to the work of Jane Jacobs: "He is less shrill than Jacobs, more confident in his materials, and yet more sensitive and critical." But it was the format of the book ("a courteously lucid deconstructionist text, which is part documentary lecture, part collage of quotations and photographs" according to The New Yorker) which was commended by John Berger a "dream of a book" following the traditions of Walter Benjamin:

Benjamin dreamed of making a book entirely of quotations, and there have been some remarkable books which are creative responses to that idea, like Peter Jukes's A Shout in the Street.

Following through in these themes of urbanism and city development, Jukes also co-authored, along with Anna Whyatt, Stephen O'Brien and the sociologist Manuel Castells, the monograph Creative Capital: 21st Century Regions.

Jukes is the author of The Fall of the House of Murdoch, published by Unbound, a crowd-funded publisher, in August 2012.

Since 2016, Jukes collaborates with Deeivya Meir on the podcast series Untold - The Daniel Morgan Murder. He also co-hosted the podcast Dial M for Mueller with journalist Carole Cadwalladr.

== Theatre ==
Jukes's early theatre work debuted at Edinburgh's Traverse Theatre: Abel Barebone and the Humble Company (1987) and Shadowing the Conqueror (1988). Shadowing the Conqueror, which transferred to Washington, D.C., was described in The Washington Post as "a depiction of the travels of Alexander the Great (Grimmette) and a contemporary photographer named Mary Ellis (Laura Giannarelli) – based very loosely on the relationship between Alexander and Pyrrho of Elis, a painter who accompanied the warrior on his expedition to the Orient – is most of all a lofty debate between two intensely committed, opposing forces." Jukes wrote the book of the London stage musical Matador, with lyrics by Edward Seago and music by Mike Leander, starring John Barrowman and Stefanie Powers, which premiered at the Queen's Theatre, Shaftesbury Avenue in April 1991.

== Journalism and politics ==
Jukes has been a book reviewer and feature writer for both The Independent and the New Statesman on themes including nationalism, art in the computer age, and apocalyptic religion.

During the 1980s and 1990s, Jukes was an active member of the Labour Party and was involved in the investigations around the cash for questions scandal. Jukes became an active Barack Obama supporter during the 2008 Democratic Party presidential primaries in the US, writing for Daily Kos and then MyDD when it became a pro-Hillary Clinton site. Later, he recorded his online experiences of the Primary 'Flame Wars' for Prospect. Following the primaries, he was one of 25 regular bloggers who began writing for a new political blog, The Motley Moose.

During the News International phone hacking scandal trial of Rebekah Brooks, Andy Coulson and others, Jukes used the crowdfunding tool Indiegogo to raise donations to allow him to livetweet the trial from start to finish. In May 2016, Jukes presented and co-produced with Deeivya Meier a 20-part podcast about the Murder of Daniel Morgan, Untold: The Daniel Morgan Murder, which topped the UK iTunes podcast chart. The following year, Jukes co-wrote a book with Alastair Morgan titled Untold: the Daniel Morgan Murder Exposed, which featured new revelations about the case.

According to Eliott Higgins, founder of the open source investigative site Bellingcat, Jukes came up with the name of the new organisation in 2014, inspired by the medieval folk tale of Belling the Cat.

Along with the Observer journalist Carole Cadwalladr Jukes revealed that the major Leave.EU donor Arron Banks met with officials from the Russian Embassy multiple times before and after the EU referendum.

In 2018, Jukes and Stephen Colegrave founded Byline Times.
