= The Canary (website) =

British left-wing news website

- Website type: News website
- Founded: 2015; 11 years ago
- Founders: Kerry-Anne Mendoza; Nancy Mendoza
- Editor: Drew Rose
- CEO: Steve Topple
- Revenue: £250,000 (2016)
- Current status: Defunct (as of 2026)

The Canary was a left-wing news website based in the United Kingdom. While focusing on UK political affairs, it also covered global, science, environment and health news, and included a satirical section. Founded in 2015 by Kerry-Anne Mendoza and her wife Nancy Mendoza, the website increased in popularity around the time of the 2017 United Kingdom general election. It was initially funded through a combination of advertising and a group of about 1,500 supporters, but by 2020 had moved to a largely reader-funded model.

In June 2022, it briefly became a worker cooperative after staff removed the management due to inequalities and mismanagement. According to Press Gazette, in July 2022, The Canary was the third most popular politics news website in the UK behind Politico and Politics Home. In 2025, it received investment from a Northern Irish businessman, which it used to buy other websites and launch a print tabloid. In summer 2026 it reported that Lloyds Bank and Metro Bank had blocked it from accessing its bank accounts. In October 2026 The Canary suspended operations "indefinitely".

== History ==
According to editor-in-chief Kerry-Anne Mendoza, The Canary was founded in October 2015 by five people seeking to "diversify the media". In August 2016, the website was funded through advertising and monthly contributions from approximately 1,500 supporters. It published 9,000 articles during its first two years.

Mendoza said that scepticism towards the mainstream media was a major motivation for the site's founders. Following the 2017 United Kingdom general election, the BBC reported that websites such as The Canary, The Skwawkbox and Another Angry Voice were attracting large audiences and having a substantial impact. Such websites were also considered to have contributed to sensationalist election coverage.

In April 2016, Mendoza stated in Free & Fearless, a magazine produced by Hacked Off, that the website was attracting 3.5 million unique users per month. She also said that a new paid subscriber joined every two hours and that the site's advertising revenue was based on rates of between £3 and £9 per thousand page views. According to its frequently asked questions page in 2019, approximately half of the website's revenue came from online advertising and the remainder from reader subscriptions.

Between 2016 and 2018, the website had an editorial team of approximately 30 people, although only five staff members earned enough to work full-time. Its annual turnover was £250,000 in 2016.

In August 2019, the website emailed users to announce that, because of reduced income, it would rely more heavily on its staff and less on freelance contributors. Following the circulation of the email, Mendoza said on Twitter that the website would leave the gig economy by the middle of August.

The website attributed its financial difficulties to changes in the Facebook and Google algorithms, which it said had reduced its traffic and advertising revenue, as well as to a campaign encouraging advertisers to blacklist it. It described itself as "susceptible to pressure from political Zionists, and our advertising revenue is under fire". The website subsequently launched a campaign to recruit an additional 1,000 subscribers. On 7 August, Mendoza announced that the target had been reached and that the campaign had secured the site's immediate future.

Following the 2017 general election, The Canary was targeted by the political group Labour Together (LT), which sought to "defeat Corbynism" and prevent future Labour leaders from pursuing Corbyn's policies. LT used social media to encourage businesses advertising on the website to withdraw their support. According to a subsequent report, the resulting decline in readership contributed to a restructuring of the newsroom.

In September 2020, the website announced plans to establish an investigative unit staffed by two journalists for an initial period of six months. It said the unit would be reader-funded and would investigate subjects requested by its readership, with the intention of attracting additional readers and securing longer-term funding. Drew Rose, formerly the director of operations, became editor-in-chief, succeeding Bex Sumner. Rose said the website had survived the "decimation" of its advertising revenue and "politically-motivated attacks on our staff", and had moved to a business model funded 95% by readers.

In July 2021, Mendoza stepped down as director and editor-at-large, transferring her shares in Canary Media Limited to colleagues. She was succeeded in the role of chief operating officer, while Emily Apple became senior editor.

In October 2022, staff announced that they had "overthrown" the site's management and had operated the publisher as a co-operative since June. They said they had discovered evidence of "gross inequalities and gross mismanagement" within the company. The co-operative structure was subsequently dissolved.

In 2025, businessman Cecil Hetherington, founder of the Northern Irish classified advertising website Used Cars NI and chair of property website PropertyPal, became a director and major shareholder. He donated approximately £2 million and held up to 50% of the shares through his company, Ulidia Investments.

According to the left-wing newspaper Morning Star, The Canary inaccurately described itself as "the first UK newspaper Murdoch doesn't own" and that the Morning Star was itself owned by "its readers and 13 national trade unions". At the time, the website's director and chief executive was Steve Topple, who had joined the organisation in early 2016.

By mid-2026, the organisation reportedly had approximately 50 full-time and part-time employees, having expanded from ten following Hetherington's investment. According to Topple, more than half of the staff worked part-time. In May 2026, the organisation announced plans to launch a printed tabloid newspaper, initially targeting a circulation of 20,000 by the end of the month and 25,000 across England and Wales by early June. The newspaper was intended to target older working-class readers. Topple described its proposed style as "shouty" and said it would "swear a bit". He argued that there was room for a progressive left-wing daily newspaper that would provide coverage he believed was lacking in publications such as The Mirror and The Guardian, including positive coverage of Zack Polanski and discussion of Israel's war in Gaza.

In June 2026, The Canary said that Lloyds Bank had debanked the organisation, leaving it with "barely any funds" and unable to pay staff. The bank had not provided a reason for the action. The website also cited other cases in which anti-Zionist and pro-Palestinian organisations and individuals had reportedly been debanked. A number of staff members reportedly went unpaid again in August. The print newspaper was suspended two weeks after its launch.

On 4 September 2026, The Canary announced that it was suspending all operations after Metro Bank blocked a second bank account. The organisation also cited "uncertainty and frustration among some members of staff", which it said had resulted in "serious internal misconduct by some staff and significant disruption within the organisation". Hetherington resigned as a director later that week.

On 19 October 2026, The Canary announced that it would close indefinitely, citing debanking and what it described as "former employees spreading malicious lies on social media". The Guardian reported that journalists at the website had alleged that the banking problems concealed wider financial mismanagement and raised concerns about the organisation's pension contributions. In a statement published on 31 October, The Canary reiterated that debanking had caused its financial difficulties, attributed the failure of projects to the loss of funds, and accused staff members of repeatedly attempting to remove chief executive Steve Topple from his position.

== Political standpoint ==
In its early years, The Canary was left-leaning and is frequently sceptical of the mainstream British press. In 2026, The National described The Canary as pro-Palestine and critical of mainstream media.

It was supportive of 2015–2019 Labour leader Jeremy Corbyn. In common with other left-wing alternative media in the United Kingdom, its stance towards the Labour leadership became more critical after Corbyn stepped down and Keir Starmer won the 2020 Labour Party leadership election.

Describing her website to Journalism.co.uk in 2015, Canary editor-in-chief Kerry-Anne Mendoza said: "For us, this is ultimately about democracy. Informed consent in the public is the bedrock of democracy, and if that informed consent isn't there because people aren't aware of the kind of information that they need to be, they won't be equipped to make the decent democratic decisions that they need to, say, for example, on climate change, the justice system, or whether austerity is a positive economic policy." Mendoza stated it was "a complete coincidence" that the website was created shortly after Corbyn's leadership victory, and added: "We don't have any affiliations with political parties, we don't have any affiliations with political organisations, and we're not actually ostensibly left-wing." She called the site's editorial stance "a counterpoint to conservative media" and "broadly liberal". Mendoza also stated that The Canary was "biased in favour of social justice, equal rights – those are non-negotiable things. We're in this as an issue-driven organisation. ... Every press organisation has an editorial stance and we're certainly no different."

== Regulation and accuracy ==
In August 2017, The Canary joined the voluntary state-approved press regulator Impress. In its first year with the regulator, The Canary was the most complained about Impress member, but the regulator upheld just two of the 58 complaints they received during 2017–2018 about its news reporting. In April 2019, The Canary was given an overall pass rating and a pass on eight out of nine factors (it failed on "handles the difference between news and opinion responsibly") by NewsGuard, an organisation which evaluates news outlets for trustworthiness.

A 2018 study by the Reuters Institute for the Study of Journalism described The Canary as "a left-wing partisan site" and an example of "alternative and partisan brands" which have "a political or ideological agenda and their user base tends to passionately share these views." Its trust rating was given as 4.69 where 10 is fully trusted, making it more trusted than the Daily Mail, BuzzFeed News, and The Sun but less than the Daily Mirror, the regional press, or any broadsheet newspaper, although its trust level among its own users was at 6.65 (a similar level to The Independent, The Daily Telegraph, and the regional press).

In response to criticism, Mendoza said: "We are human beings and we make mistakes. We clean up the mess and make sure it's clear to our readership." On 14 March 2019, The Canary said that it had produced 10,000 articles since its creation and two of its articles required deletion after editorial review, representing 0.02% of its content.

In 2020, The Jewish Chronicle' reported that Canary journalist Steve Topple, who had also appeared on Russian state media outlets Russia Today and Sputnik International Radio, provided columns for PeaceData, a website created by Russia's Internet Research Agency to swing the 2020 US presidential election to Donald Trump. In one column he described Belarus's exiled opposition leader Svetlana Tikhanovskaya as “little more than a Western regime change puppet.”

== Business model ==
In 2019, its FAQ explained its then business model, as "Each writer and section editor is paid in two ways. Firstly, each and every article receives a flat-rate equal payment from our monthly income from supporters. So with each new supporter, the pay per article goes up for everyone every month. Secondly, each article receives a top-up payment based directly on the percentage of web traffic, and therefore advertising income, that articles generate during a given calendar month." This pay-per-click model has been criticised for promoting clickbait as writers are only paid for their work if it becomes viral. Mendoza disputed this, saying that the payment structure means that people who generate the revenues get a fair share. According to one journalism lecturer, while the website is skilled at promoting its stories, the primary reason for its viral popularity may be its political standpoint.

In 2026, 80% of its revenue stream was small donations, 20% advertising.

== Reception ==
In 2016, Carl Miller of Demos has said that, while the "digital world" has been "democratizing", he believes that sites such as The Canary, which reflect a single worldview, cut down on dissenting information and are likely to make people "even angrier, more outraged, more certain that that [sic] people we disagree with are evil ... which isn't good for reasoned, civil debate." In January 2017, Owen Jones told PR Week that the website "promotes conspiracy theories and a lot of things that just aren't right. I worry about the Canary-isation of the left, where it ends up in a bizarre sub-culture that anyone who doesn't agree is seen as part of a conspiracy. But then you do get those blogs on left and right." In July 2017, Len McCluskey, the general secretary of Unite the Union, said to the Morning Star: "The media needs regulating, the control of information shouldn't be in the hands of a few billionaires. Alternative media needs supporting, and that's why Unite supports the Morning Star ... . But I'd support everything that chips away at Establishment control of the narrative — The Canary, the Skwawkbox, all of it."

In September 2017, Nick Robinson of the BBC listed the website, along with right-wing sites such as Westmonster, among alternative news sites waging a "guerrilla war" against the BBC to promote an anti-establishment agenda. Drew Rose, The Canary's director of operations, responded that "Nick Robinson's analogy that we are waging a 'guerrilla war' is apt – but it's not the war he suggests. ... For years now, swaths of the population have been ignored or otherwise failed by the established media. We're fighting to serve those people. We're doing that by helping to build a more diverse media operating outside of the establishment."

In November 2020, Leeds University political scientist Jonathan Dean wrote that "websites such as Evolve Politics, Skwawkbox and The Canary have aped a more tabloid style, with short, punchy headlines and an often rather sensationalised style of reporting. The Canary, in particular, has faced criticism for its highly partisan presentation of political news stories, with critics often deeming it symptomatic of the rise of so-called 'fake news' ... ."

=== Allegations of antisemitism ===
In 2018, the Jewish Chronicle reported that Canary writer Steve Topple was accused of antisemitic conspiracy theories for statements he made on a BBC comedy show.

In early 2019, the campaign organisation Stop Funding Fake News (SFFN) described The Canary as promoting conspiracy theories, defending antisemitism, and publishing fake news. SFFN launched a campaign to pressure advertisers not to allow their ads to run on certain websites. SFFN persuaded Macmillan Cancer Support to suspend advertising on The Canary while it reviewed online ad placement. Then-MP Chris Williamson described the SFFN's campaign against The Canary as "sinister". In March 2020, advertising for Tom Stoppard's play Leopoldstadt, which is about the legacy of the Holocaust, was removed from The Canary after allegations of antisemitism from SFFN. In response to criticism from SFFN, The Canary co-founder Nancy Mendoza, who is Jewish, said that The Canary had taken a position of solidarity with the Palestinian people, and was therefore critical of the Israeli government and of Zionism, and that it was firmly opposed to antisemitism.

In January 2021, Antisemitism and the Alternative Media, a report by Daniel Allington and Tanvi Joshi, academics at King's College London, commissioned by John Mann, Baron Mann, the UK government's independent advisor on antisemitism, stated that The Canary, alongside The Skwawkbox, "promote[s] a negative view of Jews" and views "life [as] a struggle between the oppressors and the oppressed, which leaves an in-group of 'socialists' – i.e. those who understand themselves to side with the oppressed – at constant risk of attack from a politically-defined Zionist enemy that must be driven out of the Labour Party." The authors of the report said that a quote from one of The Canary's co-founders "characterise[s] Israel as a European settler state, suggesting that practically every aspect of Israel is racist." In response, the press regulator Impress began a preliminary investigation into both websites, reviewing 41 articles and one tweet from the two publications to assess whether they were in breach of the Impress Standards Code Clause on discrimination.

In November 2021, Impress released its findings that the material that they reviewed was "not sensationalist and does not use language that is likely to provoke hatred or put a person or group in fear, nor does it appear to be intended to have that effect. Those that disagree with the Publisher's views on subjects such as Zionism may find these views offensive, adversarial or provocative but this in and of itself does not rise to the level of threat to, or targeting of, persons or groups on the basis of their protected characteristics as envisaged by the Code." Impress dismissed the matter after finding that "of the material in remit, none of it reached the threshold which would engage the discrimination clause and, therefore, further investigation would be unjustified".

== Notable articles ==
The Canary has published a number of stories which have been notable enough to be picked up by mainstream media outlets.

=== Electoral fraud investigations ===
Following the 2015 United Kingdom general election, The Canary "dug into assorted expense claims and activities in (target) seats", according to Michael White in The Guardian, after a whistleblower contacted the website to allege illegal telephone push polling by the Conservatives.

=== Portland Communications story ===
In June 2016, a Canary article saying that the 2016 parliamentary revolt against Corbyn "appears to have been orchestrated" by Portland Communications went viral and was repeated by Len McCluskey on Andrew Marr's Sunday morning BBC programme. The article listed links between partners and employees of the PR firm, where Alastair Campbell is a senior advisor, and members of the centre-left Fabian Society and other politicians on the right of the Labour Party, without providing evidence that the firm had organised the revolt.

=== Laura Kuenssberg ===
The Canary has been critical of Laura Kuenssberg's coverage of Jeremy Corbyn, and BBC News politics coverage more generally. The website promoted a petition, hosted by 38 Degrees, calling for Kuenssberg's resignation. 38 Degrees later took the petition down, with the agreement of the originator, saying that the petition "had become a focal point for sexist and hateful abuse made towards Laura Kuenssberg on Twitter." The Canary reported Craig Murray's view that the petition was probably taken down due to "Establishment pressure", while ethical entrepreneur Ian Middleton wrote in The Huffington Post that "if one looks at the list of comments published ... it's difficult to find anything remotely aggressive or sexist", and the accusations of abuse "may have been part of an orchestrated campaign on behalf of those looking to discredit the petition itself."

In the fourteen months between the withdrawal of the petition in May 2016 and 20 July 2017, according to Jasper Jackson of the New Statesman, The Canary ran "at least 17 articles specifically criticising Kuenssberg". In September 2017, The Canary published an article by Steve Topple with the inaccurate headline that Kuenssberg was "listed as a speaker at the Tory Party conference". Although the article itself stated correctly that she had been invited to speak at a fringe event, the website made several changes to its article after it was first published, without detailed clarifications. The Canary later modified its headline and added a statement released by the BBC in response, stating that she would not be speaking. In December 2017, the press regulator Impress adjudicated that the website had broken its code by publishing an inaccurate headline, not making sufficient efforts to check the facts, and failing to correct the inaccuracy with due prominence. During the Impress investigation, two board members were recused after publicly criticising Kuenssberg. The Canary's tweet remained online and was widely shared on social media.

=== Carl David Goette-Luciak ===
In September 2018, The Canary republished an article by Max Blumenthal (originally published by MintPress News) attacking Nicaragua-based Carl David Goette-Luciak, a freelance journalist reporting on anti-government protests for The Guardian, days after the Committee to Protect Journalists warned that that Goette-Luciak was the victim of a "targeted online harassment campaign" by supporters of the government. Shortly afterwards, Goette-Luciak was detained, interrogated and deported. The Canary published a further article by Blumenthal attacking the reporter, and a lecture by The Canary's editor due to be given at The Guardian's offices was protested against by the National Union of Journalists and subsequently cancelled, leading to some controversy.

== Readership ==
During July 2016, The Canary achieved over 7.5 million page views, ranking 97th in readership among British media organisations, slightly higher than The Spectator and The Economist. The site's publishers, Canary Media, rose 47 spots from 126th in June to 79th in July among the top UK publishers. By June 2020, the site had fallen out of the top 1,000 with just over 600,000 pageviews. The majority of its site traffic came from Facebook.

A 2018 study by the Reuters Institute for the Study of Journalism found The Canary to be used by 2% of the UK news audience, compared with The Times website on 5% or The Guardian on 15%. Its readers were more left wing than readers of all but one other publication in the survey.

According to Press Gazette, in July 2022 The Canary had a readership of 654,000, with 2.3 million page views, and reached 1.31% of the UK population, making it the third most popular politics news website in the UK behind Politico and Politics Home. In 2026, it reported that the site had around 500,000 visits per month, 60% of which were based in the UK. It also reported that the site's Instagram following had recently risen from 9,000 to 200,000.

== See also ==
- The London Economic
- Guido Fawkes
