= Political Scrapbook =

Defunct British political blog

- Website type: Blog
- Creator: Laurence Durnan
- Website: politicalscrapbook.net
- Commercial: No
- Launched: 2009

Political Scrapbook was a left wing political blog. The site was described as "influential" by The Independent and was viewed, along with outlets such as Left Foot Forward, as part of a cohort of British left-wing blogs which attracted significant interest from the media. The site was likened to Paul Staines' anti-establishment Guido Fawkes blog, although Staines stated "It's hard to create a leftwing version of me because of political correctness." In 2011 the site was ranked by Wikio as the 7th most influential political blog in the UK and was voted as Total Politics' 2nd best left-wing blog in 2011.

Political Scrapbook was edited by Laurence Durnan, who stated he set the site up "to make life difficult for the right".

In April 2018, the website announced that "The Scrapbook team are currently taking a break from the site to work on a number of other exciting projects", which remained unspecified. They also stated "Apologies in advance for the lack of posts. Keep an eye on our Twitter for further updates in due course". Their Twitter site has not received an update since the same day.

== See also ==
- ConservativeHome
