= Evolve Politics =

British news website

- Screenshot of Evolve Politics homepage on mobile device
- Website type: News and current affairs
- Editors: Tom D. Rogers and Jessica Miller
- Revenue: £14,830 (2017)
- Website: evolvepolitics.com
- Launched: 2015
- Current status: Active

Evolve Politics is a British left-wing news and current affairs website created in September 2015. The website describes itself as "a truly independent, shared equity media outlet, providing incisive news reporting and investigative journalism that highlights and exposes injustice, inequality and unfairness within UK politics, and throughout society in general."

== Staff and financing ==
The website's editorial staff consists of Editor-in-Chief Tom D. Rogers and Senior Editor Jessica Miller. It is funded through paid subscriptions, donations and advertising revenue from the website. For the year to the end of August 2017, Evolve made a turnover of £14,830 and a profit of £4,292.

Evolve state that their average monthly donation is £2.50, and their largest monthly contribution is £10 a month. The organisation also accept one-off donations, with their largest single donor of all-time contributing £500.

Furthermore, Evolve claim on their website that they have "never received any outside funding" and "do not accept paid articles or corporate sponsorships" because they hold their "independence and the ability to express [their] own opinions above any potential financial gain."

In February 2018, then-senior editor Matt Turner became the first pro-Corbyn blogger to successfully join the parliamentary lobby in Westminster. However, in May of the same year, Turner announced that he would be leaving the website in order to take up a role in public relations, stating that he was "looking forward to making my political points and push forward my ideas without being visible and accessible all the time like a lot of journalists and political commentators have to be".

== Content and impact ==
The website was highly supportive of the Labour Party leadership of Jeremy Corbyn and is consequently often compared with other independent pro-Corbyn sites such as The Canary, Another Angry Voice and The Skwawkbox.

A number of its stories entered the political mainstream due to their viral nature, including a story regarding the Conservative Party's decision to drop a ban on ivory trade (which had previously been in the party's 2015 manifesto). During this election, most media commentary predicted electoral disaster for the Labour Party; however, senior editor Matt Turner predicted a hung parliament in April 2017. Turner appeared on BBC Newsnight to discuss his correct prediction, and Newsnight editor Ian Katz called Evolve Politics "one of a clutch of pro-Corbyn websites which claimed to have their finger closer to the national pulse than traditional media".

During the 2017 general election Evolve reached a peak of almost two million monthly views, with a Facebook reach of more than twenty million.

After the Russian poisoning of Sergei and Yulia Skripal in Salisbury in 2018, Danny Stone of the Antisemitism Policy Trust, writing in the New Statesman noted that Evolve quoted conspiracy theorists including a 9/11 conspiracy theorist in its commentary on the attack.

== Regulation ==
In November 2017, Evolve Politics joined the state-approved press regulator Impress. In May 2018, Impress ordered the website to pay £900 in damages for falsely claiming that Sky news presenter Jonny Gould attended a 2018 charity dinner hosted by the Presidents Club at which widespread sexual misconduct was reported.

== Advertising boycott ==
In early 2019, the anonymous campaign group Stop Funding Fake News was launched to pressure advertisers not to allow their ads to run on left-wing websites such as Evolve Politics and The Canary, and the right-wing websites Westmonster, which has ceased to operate, and the Canadian Rebel News. The campaign was supported by Rachel Riley, who campaigns against the party leadership's handling of allegations of antisemitism within the Labour Party. In April 2019, Jewish News reported that Sky UK would remove adverts on political news stories across all websites, following calls from Riley for the company to stop advertising on Evolve. In August 2019, the charity Cancer Research UK said it was no longer advertising with Evolve.
