= Another Angry Voice =

British left-wing political blog

- Website type: Political blog
- Creator: Thomas G. Clark
- Website: anotherangryvoice.substack.com//
- Launched: 2010; 16 years ago
- Current status: Active

Another Angry Voice (AAV) is a British left-wing political blog written by Thomas G. Clark, established in 2010. It has regularly criticised the Conservative government and strongly supported the Labour Party leadership of Jeremy Corbyn. The blog, previously hosted on BlogSpot, moved to Substack in July 2023.

== Launch ==
Clark began writing the blog in 2010, later saying that the name was chosen "on the spur of the moment because I thought it sounded good at the time and I had to call it something", and he did not feel it to be particularly accurate description of his style.

== 2017 general election ==
The blog became increasingly popular during 2017, when it supported the Labour Party. The blog's popularity has been associated with the rise of other "hyperpartisan" left-wing blogs. Posts in 2017 attracted over 1.5 million views. A BBC report said that its popularity, along with that of similar blogs, could no longer be ignored. The growth of left-wing blogs has been cited as an explanation for why the Conservative Party's winning margin in the 2017 election was lower than many predicted.

An article in the blog, detailing policies proposed by Corbyn that Clark believed most people would agree with, went viral and was one of the most-reposted pieces in the run up to the 2017 election. It was shared over 100,000 times on social media and it, along with two other stories, were more popular than any contemporary news reports in The Guardian and BBC News for that week. Clark subsequently said his most popular posts at this time were those criticising the BBC. Another popular story was a suggestion to field "Unity" expert candidates in the 2017 election, such as an NHS doctor against health secretary Jeremy Hunt. At one point during the election campaign, Clark was writing around 20 hours a day. He has said that several people have written to him about beginning to support Labour after reading the blog.

== Criticism ==
In a 2018 article in The Economist, the blog was criticised for forming an echo chamber for like-minded people.

A Labour councillor was criticised for quoting an Another Angry Voice post entitled ‘Was the Manchester Arena atrocity a ‘false flag’ attack?’ which rejected suggestions that the state played a role in its commission, while remarking that its timing was beneficial to the Conservative government.

== See also ==
- The Canary (website)
- Evolve Politics
