= Weekend City Press Review =

- Industry: Publishing
- Founded: 1991
- Headquarters: Helensburgh, Scotland, United Kingdom
- Owner: James Barrett-Bunnage
- Website: www.weekendcitypressreview.co.uk

Weekend City Press Review is a UK publishing company which provides a summary of all the weekend's financial and business news by using 13 UK newspapers as well as summarising every company tipped in both the newspapers and the Investors Chronicle. It was created in 1991 and has attracted a range of subscribers, from city institutions and FTSE listed companies, to educational establishments and private investors.

Subscribers benefit from comprehensive coverage of major company and business stories without having to read the entire story. Weekend City Press Review is noted as "an excellent comprehensive roundup of the weekend's press" in Dominic Connolly's book The UK Trader's Bible.

It is believed that Weekend City Press Review was the first UK publisher of business news online—its first article appearing in 1995.

== History ==
The company was founded by Gareth Robertson in 1991, though he had been using the concept some time before that, it was set up in the hope to give analyst sales leads out of the weekends press. This expanded to what it is today, covering summaries and briefs from the 13 leading weekend papers, covering a profile from each of the papers, tips and hints on shares and businesses as well as providing a viewpoint from the editor.

AOL use the Weekend City Press Review to provide content to their popular UK money pages on their website, and the Investors Chronicle use a short extract of the review to produce on their homepage every Monday.

=== Charitable work ===
In 2009 the company became involved in The Lord Mayor's Appeal where it is donating a share of its profits to the organisation. The appeal is supporting charities such as St John's Ambulance and The Lord's Taverners. For 2010 the charity supported is The Connection who work with the homeless.

== Readership ==
The service is popular in the city, with prominent users such as KPMG, Goldman Sachs, Rothschilds, Slaughter and May, Deloitte, and J.P. Morgan Cazenove. Also popular with investors and stockbrokers, it is further being used by schools and universities.

== Information covered ==
The weekly electronic news letter covers 13 of the leading UK weekend newspapers. The newspapers covered are The Times, The Sunday Times, The Daily Telegraph, The Sunday Telegraph, The Independent, The Independent on Sunday, The Guardian, The Daily Mail, The Mail on Sunday, The Express on Saturday, The Express on Sunday, The Observer, and the Financial Times. It also covers the weekly magazine the Investors Chronicle which it uses for the business tips section.

== Archive ==
Weekend City Press Review boasts one of the largest and oldest online archives of business news. Started in 1995, it contains over 70,000 individual indexed business news articles.

== Ownership ==
In 2011 the company was taken over by James Barrett-Bunnage who acquired the business from Paul Pemberton and he from the IPGL, which is controlled by ICAP Chairman Michael Spencer, in April 2009.
