= Daniel Tudor (journalist) =

British author & journalist specializing in Korean affairs

- Born: 1982 (age 43–44); Manchester, England
- Occupations: Author, journalist, entrepreneur
- Spouse: Lim Hyun-ju (m. 2023)
- Children: 2
- Website: Daniel Tudor on X

Daniel Tudor is a British author, journalist and entrepreneur. Born in Manchester, England, he is now based in Seoul, South Korea. He graduated with a BA in philosophy, politics and economics from University of Oxford's Somerville College and also received an MBA from the University of Manchester's Business School.

== Life and career ==
=== South Korea ===
Tudor first visited Korea to watch the 2002 World Cup at the invitation of a university friend. This was his first trip to Asia. He decided to spend a year in South Korea upon graduation, and like many Westerners, his first job there was teaching English, in his case in an academy in Gimhae, Gyeongsang Province.

=== The Economist ===
Tudor was The Economist's Korea correspondent from 2010 to 2013, following an internship with the publication. His articles covered both South Korean and North Korean politics, as well as South Korean culture.

=== The Booth Brewing Co. ===
In 2012, Tudor wrote a piece for The Economist titled "Fiery Food, Boring Beer", in which he noted that South Koreans were known for their varied culinary traditions, but lagged behind North Korea when it came to beer culture and quality. This caught the attention of Sunghoo Yang and Heeyoon Kim, who—with Tudor—co-founded The Booth Brewing Co. in 2013. It started off as a small pub in a Seoul alleyway and has grown to a craft beer hub, with twenty beers produced across three continents.

=== Kokkiri ("Elephant") ===
Tudor is also co-founder and CEO of Kokkiri, South Korea's most popular meditation app, in partnership with Haemin, a Buddhist monk and author of The Things You Can See Only When You Slow Down (멈추면 비로소 보인 것들).

=== Personal life ===
On 13 October 2022 MBC presenter Lim Hyun-ju announced she and Tudor would be getting married. The couple held a wedding ceremony on 24 February 2023, after registering their marriage on 14 February 2023.

On 27 April 2023, Lim announced she was pregnant. Lim gave birth to a daughter on 2 October 2023. On September 3, 2024, Lim announced her second pregnancy. Lim gave birth to a second daughter on February 12, 2025.

== Books ==
=== Korea: The Impossible Country ===
Tudor's first and bestselling book, Korea: The Impossible Country, was first published in 2012 by Tuttle Publishing. It was one of the first books on South Korea meant for Western audiences, exploring Korea's cultural foundations: from family and marriage to workplace culture and clan-ism. It was re-released in paperback in 2018 and has been translated for foreign language readers.

=== A Geek in Korea ===
His second book, A Geek in Korea: Discovering Asia's New Kingdom of Cool (Tuttle, 2014), is aimed at younger audiences than his debut book. It introduces modern Korean culture, tackling topics such as K-pop, video games and skiing.

=== North Korea Confidential ===
==== Release ====
North Korea Confidential (Tuttle, 2015) was co-authored with Reuters journalist James Pearson, and was named one of the best books of 2015 by The Economist. The authors' goal was to peel back the curtain on daily life in North Korea, dispelling myths perpetuated in the Western world. According to The New York Times, "'North Korea Confidential' gives us a deeply informed close-up. Tudor, a former correspondent for The Economist, and Pearson, a Reuters reporter, have pieced together their story from North Korean insiders, defectors, diplomats and traders, and from a careful reading of texts in English, Korean and Chinese." It has been translated into Traditional Chinese, Korean, Polish, Romanian and Russian.

==== North Korean reception ====
When the book's Korean language edition was released in 2017, North Korea's Central Court sentenced two South Korean journalists and their newspaper publishers to death in absentia for their reviews of the book. The court said in a statement that journalists Son Hyo Rim (Dong-A Ilbo newspaper) and Yang Ji Ho (Chosun Ilbo newspaper), "committed [the] hideous crime of seriously insulting the dignity of the DPRK by using dishonest contents carried by a propaganda book ..."

The court did not mention the authors or the other numerous media outlets that covered the book's release. North Korean media outlet the Korean Central News Agency said in an article that North Korea Confidential was written through, "ludicrous statements of the riff-raffs including rubbish defectors two years ago."

=== Ask a North Korean ===
Ask A North Korean (Tuttle, 2018) is Tudor's latest book. Adapted from a long running column in NK News by the same name, this book uses firsthand accounts from North Korean defectors to provide insight into life in the "Hermit Kingdom"

== Other contributions ==
In addition to his work for The Economist, Tudor has also contributed to the Wall Street Journal, Financial Times, Private Eye, JoongAng Ilbo and Hankyoreh 21.

=== Interviews ===
Tudor is a popular interviewee and commentator on Korean affairs. He has been featured on NPR, Forbes, BBC, The New York Times, Time, The Wall Street Journal, The Washington Post, The Guardian, Financial Times, USA Today, and The Japan Times, among others.

== See also ==
- Lim Hyun-ju
