= LBC =

British talk radio station based in London

- London; England
- Broadcast area: United Kingdom
- Frequencies: DAB: 11D/12A Digital One; DAB+: 6C DigiB (Malta) DAB+: 12A (Channel Islands); FM: 97.3 MHz London; Freesat: 734; Freeview: 732; Sky (UK only): 0121; TalkTalk TV: 627; Virgin Media: 919
- RDS: LBC

Programming
- Format: News/talk

Ownership
- Owner: Global
- Sister stations: LBC News

History
- First air date: 8 October 1973; 53 years ago
- Former frequencies: AM: 719 kHz (720 kHz) (London) (1973–1975); AM: 1151 kHz (1152 kHz) (London) (1975–1989)

Links
- Webcast: Global Player
- Website: www.lbc.co.uk

LBC (Leading Britain's Conversation, originally London Broadcasting Company) is a British phone-in and talk radio station owned and operated by Global and based in its headquarters in London. It was the UK's first licensed commercial radio station, and began broadcasting on Monday 8 October 1973.

The launch of LBC also saw the beginning of Independent Radio News broadcasting, as LBC provided the service to independent local radio stations nationwide. LBC broadcast only to London until 2006, at which time it became available, via digital radio, in some other parts of the country. It has been available nationwide since 2014, with the letters now standing for Leading Britain's Conversation. LBC has a sister station, LBC News, dedicated to rolling news, travel and weather.

== History ==
=== Launch and early history ===
The station was originally based in studios on Gough Square, off Fleet Street in the City of London. David Jessel was LBC's original breakfast presenter; he opened the station just before 6 a.m. on Monday 8 October 1973, a week before Capital Radio began broadcasting. The original station had several presenters including Adrian Love, Jon Snow, Peter Allen, Rosie Boycott, Bel Mooney, Paul Callan and Janet Street-Porter. For 10 years from 1975 the breakfast show AM was presented by Bob Holness and Douglas Cameron. LBC's late-evening interview and phone-in programme between 9 p.m. (later 10 p.m.) and 1 a.m. was called Nightline and at various times was hosted by Adrian Love, Robin Houston, Monty Modlyn, Jeremy Beadle and Tommy Boyd. There was also a character called "Mr Nasty" (played by John Forrest), who argued over the telephone with children.

=== Changes of ownership ===
Originally owned by a consortium led by the Canadian Selkirk Communications of Vancouver, British Columbia, with a 47% stake, LBC was sold in 1987, beginning a turbulent commercial history. The new owner was media company Darling Downs, later renamed Crown Communications, owned by Australian entrepreneur David Haynes. Crown sold the station's original Gough Square base and relocated to Hammersmith and in 1989 split the station into two separate services, the news and comment station LBC Crown FM, and the phone-in London Talkback Radio on AM. The transition was not initially well received, and substantially increased costs, pushing the company into the red. In 1993, the company was sold to Shirley Porter's Chelverton Investments, after Crown fell into financial difficulties.

=== London News Radio ===
On the morning of Friday, 3 September 1993, the Radio Authority announced it would not renew the company's two licences, LBC Newstalk and London Talkback Radio, awarding the frequencies instead to London News Radio, a consortium led by former LBC staff and backed by Guinness Mahon. Staff at the station were in shock, not least because while they had received a tip-off from the Financial Times that they looked set to lose one of their frequencies, they did not expect to lose both. This was one of only a handful of times the UK media regulator has declined to renew the licence of an incumbent station. The prospective loss of the franchise brought Chelverton to the brink of collapse, and London News Radio (soon itself taken over by Reuters) bought LBC to keep it on air until the official handover date of October 1994.

London News Radio operated the station from LBC's former studios in Hammersmith as London News 97.3, a rolling news and travel information service on the FM band, and the phone-in-driven service London News Talk 1152 on the MW band. These names were simplified slightly in mid-1995 to News 97.3 and News Talk 1152 respectively, but between October 1994 and July 1996 the LBC name was not used on-air at all.

=== Return of LBC ===
Reuters then brought in additional shareholders, and between 1996 and 2002 LBC was part of London News Radio Limited, a company owned jointly by ITN, Daily Mail and General Trust, Reuters, and the GWR Group. This new consortium revived the LBC name on 1152AM on 1 July 1996. At the end of 1996, the FM service was relaunched as News Direct 97.3FM. Production for the station was moved to the basement of ITN's multimedia building in Gray's Inn Road.

=== Chrysalis ===
In 2002, the company was bought for £23.5m by the media company Chrysalis, which promised that it would lift the listenership to at least one million from around 700,000 (LBC had enjoyed an audience of more than two million in the early 1980s). Production was moved to Chrysalis's base in North Kensington, and the formatting of the two frequencies was swapped, the talk format moving to FM and the news format to AM.

On 13 January 2004, then British Prime Minister Tony Blair presented an hour-long phone-in show on the station, taking pre-booked calls from LBC 97.3 listeners. His appearance was part of the "Big Conversation" initiative to promote government as being more accessible and in touch with the people. During the 10–11 a.m. show, a caller said that he had been denied access to his children for five years and asked what Blair was planning to do about other fathers in a similar situation. Blair assured the caller he would look into his case personally. It later transpired that the caller was in fact Fathers 4 Justice member Ron Davis, who in May of that year was arrested for entering parliament and throwing a condom containing purple powder over Blair and nearby cabinet members. Davis said the attack was in response to the Prime Minister's failure to contact him or look into the matters discussed on LBC 97.3.

Mark Flanagan, the station's managing director, left Chrysalis in 2005 to set up a political consultancy company, and was replaced by David Lloyd.

In January 2006, LBC Plus launched as a paid subscription service providing podcasts; eventually this became a free catch-up service.

In September 2006, LBC 97.3 became available in some other parts of the country on the digital DAB platform, after Chrysalis bought out its partners and closed the Digital News Network rolling news station, which had previously been carried on the MXR multiplex. Each multiplex region − the North West, West Midlands, Yorkshire, north east, south Wales, and the West − broadcast the London LBC transmission, augmented with occasional bulletins of regional news and travel information.

=== Global Radio ===
In February 2007, Chrysalis confirmed media speculation that it was reviewing the entire radio operation at its investors' request. Further media speculation from The Guardian suggested that the group had little option, due to shareholder pressure, to sell its radio arm, including LBC, raising up to £200 million for new acquisitions, while The Daily Telegraph suggested that it could be the subject of a management buyout. Subsequently, it was announced on 25 June 2007 that LBC along with its sister stations The Arrow, Heart, and Galaxy network were to be sold for £170 million to Global Radio and the Chrysalis Radio operation closed down. In December 2008 the station moved to the Capital London studios in Leicester Square.

In April 2007, a new marketing slogan for (what was then called) LBC 97.3 was introduced − "London's Biggest Conversation", a play on the station's initials.

The radio station became involved in the MMR vaccine controversy after a broadcast by Jeni Barnett on 7 January 2009 in which she debated the alleged dangers of MMR vaccine with callers. It became the subject of media controversy, first because her views were criticised as irresponsible by medical journalist Dr Ben Goldacre, and then because LBC and Global Radio threatened legal action against Goldacre for copyright infringement after he refused to remove the audio of the show from his blog, which resulted in its being made available at WikiLeaks and elsewhere and the preparation of transcripts of the broadcast. David Aaronovitch in The Times argued for "a class action against LBC for permitting a presenter to inflict her preposterous prejudices on her listeners, to the detriment of someone else's kids." Norman Lamb MP tabled an Early Day Motion criticising Barnett and LBC for the likely effect of the broadcast on public health.

Since 2013 LBC has broadcast a consumer law show, called The Consumer Hour that focused on providing information, advice, and support to listeners on various consumer-related topics, such as personal finance, product safety, and consumer rights. The show was initially hosted by Clive Bull with listeners' questions answered by celebrity lawyer Dean Dunham; since 2020 Dunham has solely presented the show.

On 30 January 2014, LBC announced its intention to begin broadcasting nationally on DAB at 7 a.m. on 11 February 2014 under a new slogan, "Leading Britain's Conversation", with new jingles composed by David Arnold and performed by the City of Prague Philharmonic Orchestra. LBC took up the slot previously occupied by Jazz FM (and briefly Birdsong), and dropped the "97.3" from the station name to reinforce the notion that it now had national coverage.

In a 2023 poll by YouGov, 14% of respondents ranked LBC as a trusted news brand. A further 14% of respondents did not trust LBC. The remaining respondents were either neutral or did not answer.

As of September 2024, LBC and LBC London broadcast to a combined weekly audience of 4.1 million, according to RAJAR. Global owns and operates seven core radio brands, all employing a national network strategy, including Capital, Heart, Smooth, Radio X, Gold, Classic FM, and LBC.
