= Mark Bolland =

British public relations executive

- Born: Mark William Bolland; 10 April 1966 (age 60); Toronto, Ontario, Canada
- Education: King's Manor School
- Occupation: Public relations executive
- Known for: Deputy Private Secretary to Charles, Prince of Wales (1997–2002)
- Spouse: Guy Black (m. 2015)

Mark William Bolland (born 10 April 1966) is a British public relations executive. Bolland worked for the Advertising Standards Authority and the Press Complaints Commission before serving as Deputy Private Secretary to Charles, Prince of Wales, from 1997 to 2002.

During his time with Charles, Bolland was credited with rehabilitating the prince's public image and enhancing the public image of the relationship between Charles and Camilla Parker Bowles, who would become the prince's second wife. After leaving the Prince, Bolland established a public relations and communications firm, Mark Bolland & Associates, and has held several roles in the charitable and third sector.

== Biography ==
=== Early life ===
Bolland was born in Toronto, Ontario, Canada, the son of Arthur Bolland, who had emigrated from Middlesbrough in England, and his wife Joan. His parents later had a daughter and the family returned to England. Bolland was educated at the King's Manor School in Middlesbrough, and the University of York, where he received a BSc in chemistry.

After university Bolland worked as a public affairs executive with Public Affairs International in Toronto before joining IBM's UK branch as a marketing executive where he worked from 1987 to 1988.

Bolland then joined the Advertising Standards Authority and began a career in media regulation. Lord McGregor, then Chairman of the ASA, promoted Bolland to be Research Manager and Adviser to him and the Director-General from 1989 to 1991. Bolland then followed Lord McGregor to the newly created Press Complaints Commission (PCC), serving as his executive assistant and then being promoted to Director of the PCC from 1992 to 1996. McGregor's successor at the PCC, Lord Wakeham, recommended to Charles, Prince of Wales, that Bolland should work as his adviser, and Bolland's partner, Guy Black, who had worked previously for Wakeham, subsequently succeeded him as director of the PCC.

=== Deputy Private Secretary to the Prince of Wales ===
Bolland was appointed Assistant Private Secretary to Charles, Prince of Wales in August 1996, and in 1997 became Deputy Private Secretary. He served in the role of Deputy Private Secretary to Charles, Prince of Wales until 2002. Bolland has been described as a 'key figure' in the rehabilitation of Charles following his negative public image after the death of his first wife, Diana, in 1997 and helping to create public acceptance for the relationship between Charles and Camilla Parker Bowles which led to their marriage in 2005. The popularity rating of Charles increased from a low of 20 per cent following the death of Diana to 75 per cent during Bolland's tenure.

Bolland and the prince's Private Secretary, Stephen Lamport, helped devise a media strategy that enhanced the public image of Charles and Camilla's relationship. The pair orchestrated the media coverage of the prince's first photographed public appearance with Camilla at the Ritz Hotel in January 1999 (dubbed 'Operation Ritz'), and of Camilla's first meeting with the Queen in June 2000 at a private party at Highgrove House. A June 2000 article in The Times by Andrew Pierce said that the media coverage of the meeting between the Queen and Camilla had marked 'the culmination of three years work by Bolland and Lamport' who since the divorce of Charles and Diana had 'worked tirelessly ever since on the public rehabilitation of Prince Charles and Parker Bowles...In the past week Parker Bowles has lost the loaded word mistress. She is now referred to as companion or even partner'. The first report of the Highgrove meeting was published in The News of the World, then edited by Rebekah Brooks, a close friend of Bolland.

An October 1998 article in The Times called "The Prince's Circle" described Bolland as having been '...credited with "updating" the Prince's image' by encouraging Charles to meet the Spice Girls, Nelson Mandela, and Peter Mandelson but also said that he was blamed for the negative publicity that resulted from Penny Junor's biography of the prince, Charles: Victim or Villain?.

Bolland also helped the establishment of special media arrangements to safeguard the privacy of Charles's sons, princes William and Harry at school and university, and was reportedly nicknamed "Blackadder" by the young princes.

Lamport was replaced as the prince's Private Secretary by Michael Peat in 2002 and Bolland later felt that he should have left at the same time. He was pressured to stay and remained in post, before becoming a consultant to the Palace for a short time, at which time he decided he needed to move on.

His role was recognised by the PR industry in 2001 when he was awarded the prestigious PR Week "Professional of the Year Award".

A two-part television series on Bolland's work for Charles, Reinventing the Royals, was due to be broadcast on BBC Two in January 2014 but was postponed. The programme was written and presented by Steve Hewlett and was made without cooperation or the involvement of the royal family.

=== Post-royal work ===
In 2003, Bolland established a strategic communications consultancy, Mark Bolland & Associates, and advised a number of businesses, individuals and international foundations.

Bolland has held numerous positions in the third sector, having joined the Journalists' Charity, which was known as The Newspaper Press Fund when it was first established, as its vice-president in 2007, and serving as a trustee of the Open Futures Trust from 2010 to 2014 and the Middlesbrough and Teesside Philanthropic Foundation from 2012 to 2014. Bolland has also served as a trustee of several high net worth family charitable foundations and trusts including the Helen Hamlyn Trust from 2008 to 2014, the David Ross Foundation from 2011 to present, and as director of the Bertarelli Foundation from 2013.

Bolland wrote the Restaurant Spy column for ES, the lifestyle magazine of the London Evening Standard from 2006 to 2009, has contributed occasional articles for the Mail on Sunday, and book reviews for the British Journalism Review, and wrote a column for the News of the World under the byline of 'Blackadder'. He has also appeared on Newsnight Review.

In 2014, Bolland was named as one of London's most 1000 influential people by the Evening Standard. Bolland is a member of the Garrick Club.

=== In popular culture ===
Bolland was portrayed by Ben Lloyd-Hughes in the fifth and sixth seasons of the historical drama television series The Crown. Lloyd-Hughes depicts Bolland in his role of Deputy Private Secretary. He makes his first appearance in the series during episode nine in season five.

== Personal life ==
Bolland entered a civil partnership with his partner Guy Black in February 2006 at Islington Town Hall, in a ceremony witnessed by Murdoch MacLennan, the chief executive of the Telegraph Media Group, and Rebekah Brooks, then editor of The Sun. On 22 June 2015, the couple married, again at Islington Town Hall. The couple live in Clerkenwell and have a home in Italy.

Black was the former Press Secretary to Michael Howard during Howard's period as leader of the Conservative Party, and presently serves as the Deputy Chairman of the Telegraph Media Group and Chairman of the Royal College of Music. Black was created a life peer in 2010 as Baron Black of Brentwood, and sits as a Conservative member of the House of Lords.
