= Phil Walker (journalist) =

British newspaper editor

Philip Andrew Geoffrey Walker (28 July 1944 – 6 October 2011) was a British newspaper editor.

Walker grew up in Cardiff, where he attended Howardian High School. He entered journalism in 1962, working for the South Wales Echo, then in 1964 moved to London to work for the Daily Sketch. In 1966, he joined the Reading Evening Post, and then, in 1968, the Daily Mail. The following year, he was appointed as an assistant editor of the Daily Mirror, serving until 1980, when he became associate editor of the Daily Express. He returned to the Mirror three years later, as deputy editor, but became freelance in 1988. In 1990, he was appointed deputy editor of the Daily Star, and was promoted to editor in 1994, serving for four years.

Walker retired to Norfolk with his wife, Sharon Ring. He died on 6 October 2011, aged 67.

Media offices
Preceded by Peter Thompson	Deputy Editor of the Daily Mirror; 1983–1988	Succeeded by Bill Hagerty
Preceded by Brian Hitchen	Editor of the Daily Star; 1994–1998	Succeeded by Peter Hill
