= Ian McColl (disambiguation) =

Ian McColl (1927–2008) was a Scottish footballer and manager.

Ian McColl may also refer to:

- Ian McColl, Baron McColl of Dulwich (born 1933), British surgeon, professor, and politician
- Ian McColl (journalist) (fl. 1970s), editor of the Daily Express
