= Dick Dinsdale =

British newspaper editor

Richard Lewis Dinsdale (23 June 1907 – 2 December 1995) was a British newspaper editor.

Dinsdale grew up in Kingston upon Hull, and attended Hull Technical College, before joining the Hull Daily Mail as a reporter, in 1926. He then moved into sub-editing, working at the Newcastle Evening World, Manchester Evening News, Daily Express, Evening News and the Daily Mirror, then for the War Service during World War II. He returned to the Mirror after the war, rising to become Deputy Editor in 1955. In 1961, he was moved to the Daily Herald, serving as its final Deputy Editor, and as the first Deputy Editor of The Sun. In 1965, he was promoted to become Editor of the newspaper, remaining in post until 1969. He then served as Chairman of West of England Newspapers, retiring in 1972.

Media offices
Preceded by ?	Deputy Editor of the Daily Mirror; 1955–1961	Succeeded by ?
Preceded by Geoffrey Pinnington	Deputy Editor of the Daily Herald; 1961–1964	Succeeded by Position abolished
Preceded by New position	Deputy Editor of The Sun; 1964–1965	Succeeded by ?
Preceded by Sydney Jacobson	Editor of The Sun; 1965–1969	Succeeded by Larry Lamb
