= Rupert Christiansen =

British writer (born 1954)

Rupert Christiansen (born 1954) is an English writer, journalist and critic.

== Life and career ==
Born in London, Christiansen is the grandson of Arthur Christiansen (former editor of the Daily Express) and son of Kay and Michael Christiansen (former editor of the Sunday and Daily Mirror). He was educated at Millfield and King's College, Cambridge, where he took a double first in English. As a Fulbright scholar, he also attended Columbia University from 1977 to 1978.

He was hired by Rodney Milnes as a reviewer for Opera magazine, and then took over Milnes' column in The Spectator. He went on to write for many other newspapers and periodicals, including Harper's and Queen, Vanity Fair, The Times Literary Supplement and Literary Review, all of them British or American.

He has written a number of books, winning the Somerset Maugham Award in 1988 for Romantic Affinities. His memoir I Know you're Going to be Happy won the Spear's Memoir of the Year prize in 2013.

Formerly arts editor of Harper's and Queen and deputy arts editor of The Observer, he became opera critic and arts columnist of The Daily Telegraph and dance critic of The Mail on Sunday in 1996. Christiansen sits on the editorial board of Opera magazine. In 2010, he was appointed to the international jury of the Birgit Nilsson Prize. In 2022, he was appointed dance critic of The Spectator and was Dramaturg for Dickie Beau's Showmanism! at the Ustinov Studio, Theatre Royal, Bath.

Christiansen was elected a Fellow of the Royal Society of Literature in 1997. Between 2014 and 2016, he was a Royal Literary Fund Fellow at University of East Anglia, and since 2016 he has been Collaborating Research Scholar at Keble College, Oxford, where he also teaches.

Formerly a board member of the Charleston Trust (1995–2010) and Gate Theatre (1993–2012), he was appointed to the boards of the Cambridge Arts Theatre (2015-2025) and Shadwell Opera (2016-2022). He now sits on the board of The 240 Project.

In 2009, he entered a civil partnership with the architectural critic Ellis Woodman. He lives in London.

Christiansen stood down as opera critic of The Daily Telegraph in 2020., but continues to write for the paper as a book reviewer and commentator on the arts.

== Books ==
- Prima Donna: A History (1984)
- Romantic Affinities: Portraits From an Age, 1780–1830 (1988)
- Paris Babylon: Grandeur, Decadence and Revolution 1869–75 (1995)
  - UK edition: Tales of the New Babylon: Paris, 1869-75 (1994)
- The Visitors: Culture Shock in 19th Century Britain (2000)
- Arthur H Clough 1819–1861 (2001)
- Faber Pocket Guide to Opera (2002; revised 2014)
- The Complete Book of Aunts (2006)
- Once More, with Feeling! A Book of Classic Hymns & Carols (2007)
- I Know You're Going to be Happy: A Story of Love and Betrayal (2013)
- City of Light: The Reinvention of Paris (2018)
- Diaghilev's Empire: How the Ballets Russes Enthralled the World (2022)
