= Basil Cardew =

British journalist

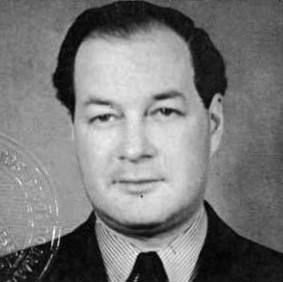
- Born: 28 October 1906
- Died: 30 November 1992 (aged 86); West Sussex, England
- Occupation: Journalist

Basil Ivor Denton Cardew (28 October 1906 – 30 November 1992) was a British journalist. He was the motoring correspondent for the Daily Express and the editor of their annual motor show review from the 1950s to the 1970s. He also served as a war correspondent during the Second World War. He was described by The Times as "a compelling anecdotalist and a lavish spender of his paper's expenses".

== Early life ==
Basil Cardew was born on 28 October 1906, the son of the journalist Alfred Roger Denton-Cardew (1878–1945), who worked for the Daily Mail for 38 years as the racing correspondent, writing as "Robin Goodfellow", and was killed in a road accident. His mother was Ellen Fielder Cardew.

== Career ==
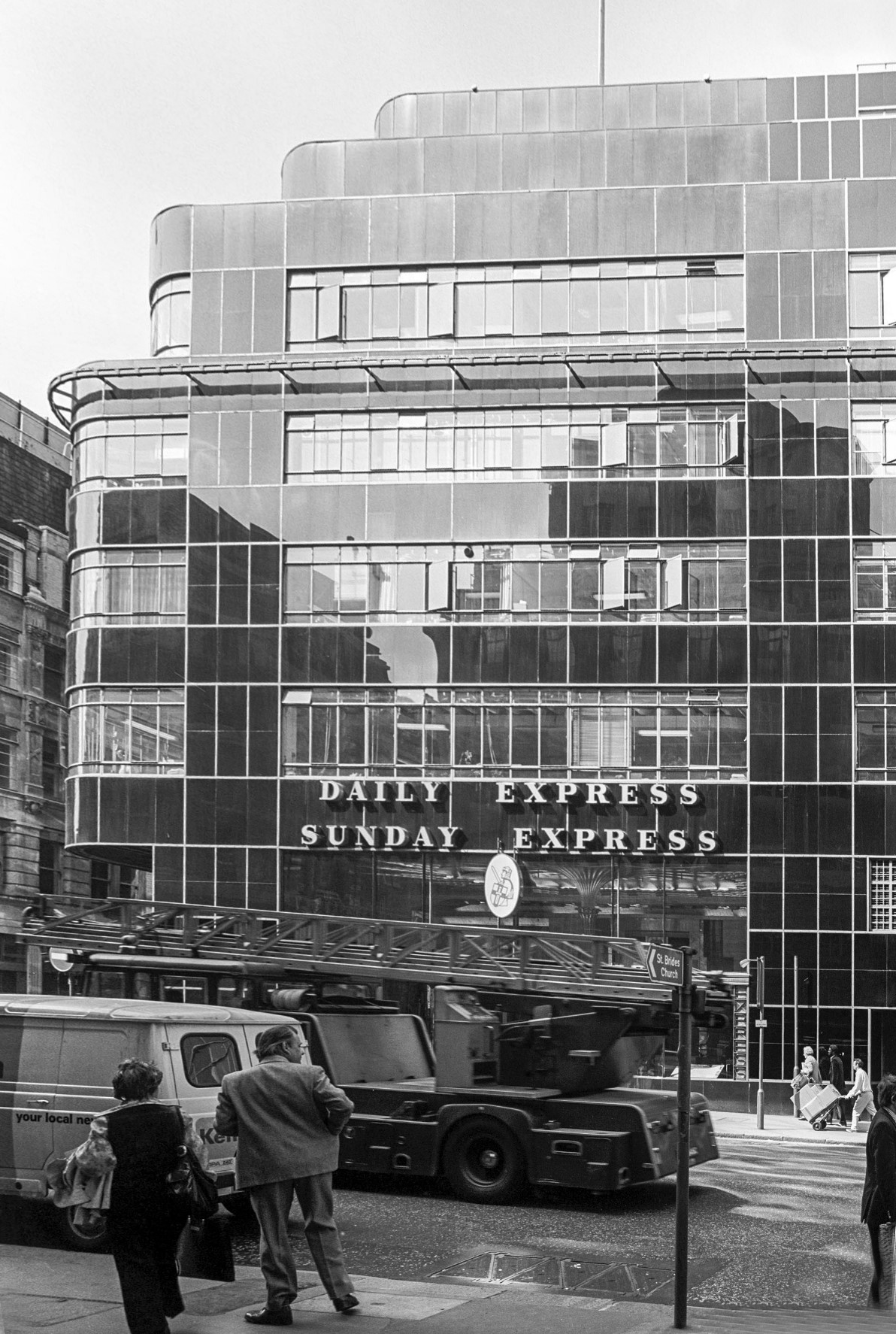
Daily Express building, Fleet Street, London

Cardew's journalistic career began at the Press Association. Early in his career he saw the land speed record attempts of Malcolm Campbell, who he was close to, and the water speed attempt of Henry Segrave in 1930 in which Segrave was killed. He joined the Daily Express in 1933 when Arthur Christiansen took over as editor and began to revamp the paper, resulting in a large increase in circulation. His early stories for the paper included attending the divorce hearing of Wallis and Ernest Simpson.

He served as a war correspondent during the Second World War reporting from the home front and abroad where he had several narrow escapes as a result of working too close to the front line. After the war, he was the motoring and air correspondent for the Express and was a well known figure at motor racing events and airshows in the 1940s and 50s. He was the editor of the reviews of the paper's motor show published annually from the 1950s to the 1970s.

In their obituary, The Times described him as "a compelling anecdotalist and a lavish spender of his paper's expenses" with a camel-hair coat and "rakish trilby" hat. John Bullock described him as "one of the most outstanding motoring writers of the day. He covered every major motoring event over a period of some 40 years". David Kynaston described him as "anti-pedestrian".

== Death ==
Cardew died in West Sussex, on 30 November 1992. He left an estate not exceeding £125,000.

== Selected publications ==
- Daily Express Motor Show Review (multiple annuals, 1950s to 1970s)
