= Roger Wood (journalist) =

Roger Wood (4 October 1925 – 2 November 2012) was the editor of the Daily Express and New York Post.

== Early life ==
Wood was born in Antwerp, Belgium, and spoke no English until he was seven when he moved with his family to Great Britain. He served in the Royal Air Force in World War II. He graduated from Oxford University.

== Daily Express ==
In 1962, aged 37, he became the youngest editor of the Daily Express, succeeding Edward Pickering, editor while Edwards was deputy editor, Wood was both preceded and succeeded by Bob Edwards.

== New York Post ==
In 1975, he began working for Rupert Murdoch and edited the weekly Star Magazine until his move to The New York Post. In 1977, he became executive editor of the Post, succeeding Edwin Bolwell, six months after Murdoch bought the paper. Under Wood, circulation increased from 400,000 to over a million.

The paper's "Page Six" grew in popularity for celebrity gossip. Some of the newspapers most famous headlines occurred on his watch including "Headless Body in Topless Bar" (about a murder in Queens, New York); "Eleven Dead and the Band Played On" (about a fatal stampede at a The Who concert in Cincinnati, Ohio, and "Granny Executed in Her Pink Pajamas". Wood was noted for calling men "dear boy," and women "lovely one". After leaving the Post in 1986 he was editorial director for newspapers for Murdoch's News Corporation.

== Death ==
Roger Wood died of cancer on 2 November 2012, aged 87, in New York City. He was survived by his wife, son and brother.

Media offices
Preceded by Bob Edwards	Editor of The Daily Express; 1962 – August 1963	Succeeded by Bob Edwards
