= Helliker =

Helliker is a surname. Notable people with the surname include:

- Adam Helliker (born 20th century), English journalist
- Kevin Helliker (born 1959), American journalist
- Thomas Helliker (1784–1807), English mill worker who was hanged
