= Patsy Robertson =

Jamaican journalist and diplomat (1933–2020)

- Born: Patsy Blair Pyne; 28 August 1933; Malvern, Saint Elizabeth Parish, Jamaica
- Died: 18 August 2020 (aged 86); London, England
- Other name: Patsy Pyne Robertson
- Education: Wolmer's Girls' School; New York University
- Occupations: Journalist and diplomat, Director of Information at the Commonwealth Secretariat and Official Spokesperson for The Commonwealth
- Spouse: Calum Robertson (m. 1964–2012, his death)
- Parent(s): Ina Weston and Austin Pyne
- Relatives: Helen Pyne-Timothy (sister)

Patsy Blair Robertson (28 August 1933 – 18 August 2020) was a Jamaican journalist and diplomat, who was Director of Information at the Commonwealth Secretariat and the Official Spokesperson for The Commonwealth from 1983 to 1994. She played a significant role in conjunction with Sir Shridath "Sonny" Ramphal, the Commonwealth's second Secretary-General, in that organisation's long battle against apartheid in South Africa. She later served with UNICEF, the UN, and as founding Chair of the Ramphal Institute, a London-based not-for-profit organization with a mission to advance knowledge and research in such areas of policy as development, education and environmental issues.

== Career ==
Patsy Robertson (née Pyne) was born in the Malvern district of Saint Elizabeth Parish, Jamaica, the fifth child of eight. In 1945, she won a coveted scholarship to attend Wolmer's Girls' School in Kingston (where her sisters Kathleen and Helen were also educated). She worked briefly as a newspaper journalist in Jamaica before going to the US and attending New York University (where her circle included James Baldwin), graduating with a liberal arts degree. In the late 1950s she travelled to Britain; in an interview in 2000 she said: "I got a job at the BBC ... working in the newsroom of the World Service at Bush House where they prepared the news bulletins. And from there, I joined the London office of the Federal Government of the West Indies which had begun to recruit staff for the proposed diplomatic service when independence was given to this new Caribbean nation. ... then the Federation broke up and Jamaica became independent in 1962. I was sent for training at the then Commonwealth Relations Office and remained in London."

During the 1960s she was involved with the anti-apartheid movement, and having left the Jamaican diplomatic service she joined the Commonwealth Secretariat on its establishment in 1965, and for the next 28 years handled its media affairs, disseminating information about the Commonwealth worldwide. She was present at the 1978 conference of Commonwealth non-governmental organisations in Dalhousie University, Nova Scotia, that led to the foundation of the Commonwealth Journalists' Association, and would remain, in the words of Lord Black of Brentwood, chairman of the CPU Media Trust, "throughout her lifetime and her distinguished career, a doughty champion of press freedom".

She served as the Secretariat's Director of Information and the Official Spokesperson for The Commonwealth at international conventions, including Commonwealth Heads of Government meetings, from 1983 to 1994. As described by Victoria Brittain in The Guardian, Robertson was "a prominent figure in the historic turning of the tide against Margaret Thatcher's support for apartheid South Africa by the Commonwealth leadership, headed by Sir Shridath (Sonny) Ramphal." According to The Times: "Sir Shridath 'Sonny' Ramphal, the Commonwealth's second secretary-general, was the public face of that organisation's long battle against apartheid in South Africa and Britain’s refusal to join it. Scarcely less important, however, was Patsy Robertson, the Jamaican official behind Sir Sonny, who for nearly three decades used her role as the Commonwealth's spokeswoman to foment international opposition to South Africa's pernicious regime, and to challenge Britain's assertion that it could be reformed, not destroyed." As characterised by Marina Salandy-Brown, "It was a war of attrition, led by Patsy behind the scenes, in which we journalists all had a small part to play."

After Robertson left the Commonwealth Secretariat in 1994, she joined the United Nations (UN) in the role of senior media adviser to the Secretary-General of the Fourth World Conference on Women held in Beijing, China, in 1995, returning to the UN to fill the same role for the Beijing +5 conference in New York in 2000, and for the General Assembly Special Session on Children in 2001 and 2002.

In 2007 she was appointed chair of the Ramphal Institute – which was founded as the Ramphal Centre for Commonwealth Policy Studies and formally launched at Marlborough House in 2008 at a celebration to mark the 80th birthday of Sir Shridath Ramphal, Commonwealth Secretary-General from 1975 to 1990 – a post she would hold until the time of her death. She was also Chair of Widows Rights International and the Commonwealth Association, and a trustee of several charities including the Thomson Foundation, the Commonwealth Press Union and the British Empire and Commonwealth Museum and, additionally, she was a founder member and President of the Friends of the Georgian Society of Jamaica, a small charity founded in 1994 by her friend Pamela Beshoff, dedicated to "the noble task of preserving Jamaica's history and heritage" by conserving and promoting awareness of the island's historic structures. In 2015 the Policy Institute at King's College London announced her appointment as a visiting professor.

Honours and recognition that she received include a Nexus Commonwealth Award in 2013 for her Outstanding Contribution, "presented to an individual who has demonstrated long and tireless service to one or more Commonwealth institutions". According to former Commonwealth Secretary-General Chief Emeka Anyaoku, Patsy Robertson was "a true symbol of the modern Commonwealth who served the organization with passion and unflinching dedication", who worked "with singular fervor to support its structures, and who never minced words in criticizing actions or pronouncements by governments that she perceived as undermining the principles and values that animate the modern Commonwealth."

== Personal life ==
She was married to Calum Robertson, who predeceased her. She had three children: John, Sarah and Neil.
