= Commonwealth Press Union =

The Commonwealth Press Union (CPU), formerly the Empire Press Union, was an association composed of 750 members in 49 countries, including newspaper groups (with several hundred newspapers), individual newspapers, and news agencies throughout the Commonwealth of Nations (Britain and mostly its former colonies). They were represented within the CPU by their proprietors, publishers or senior executives.

The aims and objectives of the organisation were to uphold the ideas and values of the Commonwealth; to promote, through the press, understanding and goodwill among members of the Commonwealth; and to advance the freedom, interests and welfare of the Commonwealth press and those working within it by i) monitoring and opposing all measures and proposals likely to affect the freedom of the press in any part of the Commonwealth, ii) working for improved facilities for reporting and transmitting news, and iii) promoting the training of all involved in the Commonwealth's press.

The CPU offered some of the Commonwealth's most prestigious awards, including the Commonwealth Press Union Fellowship in International Journalism and the Harry Brittain Fellowships.

The origin of the organisation went back to 1909 with the staging of the first Imperial Press Conference. This led to the creation of the Empire Press Union, which later became the Commonwealth Press Union.

The CPU was wound up on 31 December 2008. According to a press release on the former organisation's website, a new organisation, provisionally named the Commonwealth Press Training and Education Trust was formed in January 2009 "to carry on the vital work of the CPU".

== Commonwealth Press Union Media Trust ==
The Commonwealth Press Union Media Trust aims to continue to promote the spirit of the CPU. CPU Media Trust will provide a "virtual" successor to the old organisation, taking forward its aims and aspirations to support the 21st century's media.

The CPU Media Trust has been established to defend the interests of the Commonwealth media. The Trust is committed to a professional, ethical and effective media across the Commonwealth. Its primary concerns are supporting media freedom and media rights, the training of journalists in the skills necessary for them to enable their work and a thorough understanding of media law and the establishment and support of self-regulatory bodies throughout the Commonwealth.

Lord Black of Brentwood of the Telegraph Media Group chairs the CPU Media Trust board of Trustees. The other members of the board are Patsy Robertson, Bob Satchwell, Derek Smail, Ian Beales, Robin Esser, Phil Harding and John Spencer. Also currently Lindsay Ross, former Director of the CPU, is Consultant to the Trust.

=== Online training ===
The CPU Media Trust is now offering a selection of online training courses which are accessible to all. The courses are in basic journalism & ethics, business journalism and newsroom management, and are designed to be conducted and completed online.

This is a key pillar of the Trust's work, using modern communication tools to strengthen the skill base and increase the professionalism of the Commonwealth media.

=== Media Law Project 2011 ===
The promotion of democracy and human rights has been a major undertaking by the Commonwealth and the Secretariat for decades. Yet as democracy has increased throughout the Commonwealth, media freedom has decreased. This project is aiming to create a report that will be presented to Commonwealth ministers and officials in an effort to create momentum for changes across the Commonwealth.

== See also ==
- Commonwealth Broadcasting Association
