= Michael Christiansen =

British newspaper editor (1927–1984)

Michael Robin Christiansen (7 April 1927 – 12 June 1984) was a British newspaper editor.

The son of Arthur Christiansen, editor of the Daily Express, Michael followed his father into journalism. He worked first at the Daily Mail, then in 1956 became deputy editor of the Daily Mirror. He rose to become assistant editor, and in 1962 gave John Pilger his first job in Britain, on the basis that he supposed he would be good at cricket.

In 1963, Christiansen was appointed as editor of the Sunday Mirror, remaining in post until he became deputy editor of the Daily Mirror in 1972, then editor in 1974. He suffered a stroke the following year, forcing him to retire. In later life, he ran a bookshop in Chelmsford, Essex. He died there on 12 June 1984, aged 57.

In 2013, Christiansen's son Rupert published an account of growing up with his father called I Know You're Going to be Happy.

Media offices
Preceded by Reg Payne	Editor of the Sunday Mirror; 1963–1972	Succeeded by Bob Edwards
Preceded by Geoffrey Pinnington	Deputy Editor of the Daily Mirror; 1972–1974	Succeeded by Mike Molloy
Preceded by Tony Miles	Editor of the Daily Mirror; 1974–1975	Succeeded by Mike Molloy
