= Bob Edwards (British journalist) =

British journalist (1925–2012)

Robert John Edwards CBE (26 October 1925 – 28 May 2012) was a British journalist.

Edwards was editor of Tribune (1951–54), a feature writer on the Evening Standard (1954–57), deputy editor of the Sunday Express (1957–59), managing editor of the Daily Express (1959–1961) then its editor (1961), editor of the Glasgow Evening Citizen (1962–63), editor of the Daily Express again (1963–65), editor of the Sunday People (1966–1972) and editor of the Sunday Mirror (1972–1984). He was a director of Mirror Group Newspapers from 1976 to 1988.

He published an autobiography in 1988, Goodbye Fleet Street. He was interviewed by National Life Stories (C467/10) in 2007 for the 'Oral History of the British Press' collection held by the British Library.

Edwards was appointed a CBE in the 1986 Birthday Honours. He died on 28 May 2012, at the age of 86.

Media offices
| Preceded by Michael Foot and Evelyn Anderson | Editor of Tribune; 1952–1955 | Succeeded by Michael Foot |
| Preceded by Edward Pickering | Deputy Editor of the Sunday Express; 1957–1959 | Succeeded by ? |
| Preceded by Edward Pickering | Acting Editor of the Daily Express; 1961 | Succeeded by Roger Wood |
| Preceded by Roger Wood | Editor of the Daily Express; 1963–1965 | Succeeded by Derek Marks |
| Preceded by Stuart Campbell | Editor of the Sunday People; 1966–1972 | Succeeded by Geoffrey Pinnington |
| Preceded by Michael Christiansen | Editor of the Sunday Mirror; 1972–1984 | Succeeded by Peter Thompson |
