= Arthur Firth =

Arthur Firth was an editor of the Daily Express between June 1980 and October 1981. He replaced Derek Jameson as editor. Firth started his career at the Lancashire Evening Post, a local daily newspaper then based on Fishergate in Preston, Lancashire. After a spell as a sub-editor on the Daily Herald in Manchester, at 32 he gained a position as a sub-editor at the Daily Express and rose to become northern editor 12 years later and deputy editor under Derek Jameson 6 years after that.

Media offices
Preceded by Derek Jameson	Editor of The Daily Express; 1980 - 1981	Succeeded by Christopher Ward
