= Ian McColl (journalist) =

Scottish journalist and politician (1915–2005)

Ian McColl CBE (22 February 1915 – 21 June 2005), was a Scottish journalist, editor and Liberal Party politician.

== Background ==
He was the eldest son of John McColl and Sarah Isabella (aka Morag) McPherson, of Glasgow and Bunessan, Isle of Mull. He was educated at Hillhead High School, Glasgow. He married, in 1968, Brenda McKean. They had one daughter. He served during the war, with the Royal Air Force, 1940–46 (despatches, 1945). He was with Air Crew, Coastal Command 202 Squadron.

== Political career ==
In 1931 he joined the Liberal Party at the age of 16. In 1933 he was elected to the executive of the Scottish Liberal Federation. In 1938 he became Honorary Secretary of the Scottish Liberal Federation. McColl twice stood as a Liberal party candidate for the United Kingdom Parliament; in the 1945 General Election at Dumfriesshire finishing third

General Election 1945 Electorate 47,983
| Party | Candidate | Votes | % | ±% |
|---|---|---|---|---|
| National Liberal | Niall Malcolm Stewart Macpherson | 16,465 | 47.4 | |
| Labour | D Dunwoodie | 12,388 | 35.7 | |
| Liberal | Fl-Off. Ian McColl | 5,850 | 16.9 | |
| Majority | | 4,077 | 11.7 | |
| Turnout | | | 72.3 | |
| National Liberal hold | | Swing | | |

and at the 1950 General Election at Greenock coming second.

General Election 1950 Electorate 48,792
| Party | Candidate | Votes | % | ±% |
|---|---|---|---|---|
| Labour | Hector McNeil | 20,548 | 50.6 | |
| Liberal | Ian McColl | 11,638 | 28.7 | |
| Independent Labour | J. S. Thomson | 6,458 | 15.9 | |
| Communist | John Ross Campbell | 1,228 | 3.0 | |
| Irish Anti-Partitionist | O. Brown | 718 | 1.8 | |
| Majority | | 8,910 | 21.9 | |
| Turnout | | | 83.2 | |
| Labour win | | | | |

== Media career ==
He joined the Scottish Daily Express as a cub reporter in 1933. He was Editor of the Scottish Daily Express from 1961 to 1971. He was Editor of the Daily Express from 1971 to 1974. He was a Director of Express Newspapers Ltd, from 1971 to 1982. He was Chairman of Scottish Express Newspapers Ltd, from 1975 to 1982. He was a Member of the Press Council from 1975 to 1978. He was a Vice-President of the Newspaper Press Fund from 1981 to 2005. He was Chairman of the Media Division for the 1986 Commonwealth Games, Scotland from 1983 to 1986. He was honoured with the Bank of Scotland, Scottish Press Life Achievement Award, in 1993.

He was appointed a Commander of the Most Excellent Order of the British Empire in 1983.

Media offices
| Preceded by Derek Marks | Editor of The Daily Express; 1971 - October 1974 | Succeeded by Alastair Burnet |
