= Dawn Neesom =

English journalist

- Born: 11 December 1964 (age 61); Stratford, London, England
- Occupations: Journalist, former Editor of the Daily Star

Dawn Neesom (born 11 December 1964) is an English journalist. She was promoted to the post of editor of the Daily Star newspaper in December 2003, and left at the end of February 2018.

Born in Stratford, London, England, Neesom attended Valentines High School in Ilford, Essex. Her mother was a cleaner and her father a lorry driver.

Neesom has claimed at various times that her career in journalism began on the local weekly newspaper the Newham Recorder, but this has been shown to be untrue and she no longer makes this claim. She also worked on Woman's Own magazine before joining The Sun newspaper as a feature writer in 1992. She was promoted to woman's editor before she joined the Daily Star as their woman's editor in 1997. Between 1997 and 2003, she was promoted to features editor and then associate editor (features) before, in September 2003, becoming joint deputy editor with Hugh Whittow. She left her post as the Daily Star's editor at the end of February 2018 after the takeover by Reach plc, though she continues as a columnist for the newspaper.

Neesom is a regular guest on talkRADIO, frequently appearing on many of their shows, especially with Mike Graham, where she regularly joins Mike and others for the "Plank of the Week" segment, as well as guest hosting on the station. Neesom is a regular presenter on GB News.

She supports West Ham United and also practises kickboxing in her spare time.

Media offices
Preceded by Peter Hill	Editor of the Daily Star; 2003–2018	Succeeded by Jon Clarke
