= Brian Hitchen =

British newspaper editor and publisher

Brian Hitchen CBE
- Born: 8 July 1936; Chadderton, Lancashire, England
- Died: 2 December 2013 (aged 77) near Alicante, Spain
- Occupation: Journalist

Brian Hitchen, CBE (8 July 1936 – 2 December 2013) was a British newspaper editor. Late in his career, he worked as a publisher.

Hitchen began his career with the Daily Despatch in Manchester as a copyboy, and then joined the Bury Times as a trainee reporter a year later. His national service followed in which he served in the Parachute Regiment during 1954–56. After national service, following a year on the Manchester Evening News, he began his national newspaper career when he joined the Daily Mirror in their Manchester office. In 1963 he became their foreign correspondent in Paris, and then from 1965 to 1972, he reported from all over the world for the Mirror.

In 1965 he was sent to cover the 1965 India-Pakistan War. Whilst working for the Daily Mirror's New York City bureau he reported on the 1968 Assassination of Martin Luther King Jr. and on the May 1970 Bogota Bracelet scandal involving England's captain, Bobby Moore, before the 1970 World Cup. Hitchen returned to London on the news desk for the Daily Mirror in 1972, later joining the Daily Express in the same post where he remained between 1973 and 1978.

Hitchen edited the Daily Star from 1987 to 1994, when he became the editor of the Sunday Express for a year. In 1996, he set up Brian Hitchen Communications and also became chairman of the Kerry Life and Irish Country Life publications.

In 2013, an incident with a motorist while crossing the road near Alicante, Spain, led to Hitchen's wife being killed instantly, while Hitchen himself died from his injuries a few hours later.

Hitchen was appointed a CBE in Margaret Thatcher's resignation honours list in 1990.

Media offices
Preceded by Michael Gabbert	Editor of the Daily Star; 1987–1994	Succeeded by Phil Walker
Preceded by Eve Pollard	Editor of the Sunday Express; 1994–1995	Succeeded by Sue Douglas
