= Press Standards Board of Finance =

The Press Standards Board of Finance (Pressbof) was set up by the Press Council to raise a levy on the newspaper and periodical industries to finance the Council, which had previously been funded directly by newspaper proprietors. Pressbof later funded the Press Complaints Commission. This arrangement was intended to ensure secure and independent financial support for effective self-regulation. Pressbof ceased to actively operate following the abolition of the Press Complaints Commission in 2014, and it was dissolved in August 2016.

== Final membership ==
- Chairman: Lord Black of Brentwood, Executive Director of the Telegraph Media Group.
- Secretary & Treasurer: Jim Raeburn, director of the Scottish Newspaper Publishers Association 1984-2007
- Clive Milner, Chairman, Newspaper Publishers Association
- Robin Burgess, Chief Executive, Cumbrian Newspapers Group Ltd
- David Newell, Director, The Newspaper Society
- Nicholas Coleridge, Managing Director, Conde Nast Publications (UK)
- Barry McIlheney, Chief Executive, Professional Publishers Association
- Paul Dacre, Editor in Chief, Associated Newspapers plc
- John Fry, Chief Executive, Johnston Press plc
- Paul Vickers, Secretary and Group Legal Director, Trinity Mirror plc
