= Helen Pyne-Timothy =

Jamaican feminist literary critic and academic (1937–2015)

- Born: Helen Dorothea Pyne; 1937; Glengoffe, Jamaica
- Died: 2015 (aged 77–78); Jamaica
- Education: Wolmer's Girls' School; University of Toronto
- Notable work: The Woman, the Writer and Caribbean Society (1998)
- Spouse: Earl Timothy
- Relatives: Patsy Robertson (sister)

Helen Pyne-Timothy (1937 – 2015) was a Jamaican feminist literary critic and academic, who was a founder and the inaugural president of the Association of Caribbean Women Writers and Scholars (ACWWS), a contributing editor of the journal MaComère, and the author of the 1998 book The Woman, the Writer and Caribbean Society.

== Biography ==
Born in Glengoffe, Jamaica, she was educated at Wolmer's Girls' School in Kingston and at the University of Toronto in Canada and after graduating from university, moved to Trinidad where she initially taught at Mausica Teachers College. Going on to be a senior lecturer in Literature and Linguistics in the Faculty of Arts and General Studies at the University of the West Indies (UWI) at St. Augustine, she eventually became Acting Dean there. After retiring from UWI, she held Visiting Professor/Fellow roles at several US universities, including at the Bunting Institute at Radcliffe College, the University of California at Los Angeles and the University of California at Santa Barbara, George Mason University and Cornell University.

According to Opal Palmer Adisa, Pyne-Timothy "saw the need for women to come together to celebrate the works of Caribbean writers and scholars" and in 1995 was a founding member of the Association of Caribbean Women Writers and Scholars (ACWWS), spearheading the organization as its inaugural president. She also served as a contributing editor of MaComère, journal of the ACWWS, first published in 1998. Pyne-Timothy was the author of The Woman, the Writer, and Caribbean Society (1997), and also had her scholarly work published in book collections and journals, including in CLA Journal, MaComère and the Journal of Haitian Studies.

She was married to Dr Earl Timothy, who died in 2014.

== Selected bibliography ==
- The Woman, the Writer, and Caribbean Society: Critical Analyses of the Writings of Caribbean Women. Center for African American Studies, 1998. ISBN 9780093493446
