= Robin Esser =

British newspaper executive (1933–2017)

Robin Charles Esser (6 May 1933 – 6 November 2017) was a British newspaper executive and editor.

After doing National Service and studying at Wadham College, Oxford University, where he edited the Cherwell newspaper, Esser began his career as a reporter with the Daily Express and Daily Sketch in 1957. He edited the Express' "Hickey" column, and gave both Nigel Dempster and Paul Dacre their first jobs on a national newspaper. By 1969, he was the newspaper's New York editor, and was the first British journalist to interview the Apollo 11 astronauts.

He later became consultant editor of the London Evening News, before in 1985 returning to the Daily Express. In 1986, he became editor of the Sunday Express, a post he held until 1989. A great supporter and friend of Margaret Thatcher, Esser was due to receive a knighthood in 1990 but declined the honour on the grounds that it was not appropriate for a serving editor to accept it.

Esser moved to the Daily Mail in 1991, where he introduced an arts and entertainment supplement, published on Fridays. He subsequently became the paper's Executive Managing Editor and oversaw the launch of its website MailOnline.

He was an active member of the Society of Editors, for which he chaired the Parliamentary & Legal Committee, and the Commonwealth Press Union Media Trust.

Esser published three books, The Hot Potato (1969), The Paper Chase (1971), and Crusaders In Chains (2015).

== Personal life ==
He was married to Shirley Clough and they had four children. After an accident in 1972 while on holiday Shirley died. He married Tui France in 1981 and they had two children.

Media offices
Preceded by John Junor	Editor of the Sunday Express; 1986–1989	Succeeded by Robin Morgan
