= Daily Star (United Kingdom) =

British daily tabloid newspaper published by Reach plc

- News with a Wink

- Front page, 6 January 2026
- Type: Daily newspaper
- Format: Tabloid
- Owner: Reach plc
- Publisher: Reach plc
- Editor: Ben Rankin
- Founded: 2 November 1978; 47 years ago
- Political alignment: Labour (historical); Politically neutral (current)
- Headquarters: Canary Wharf; London; United Kingdom
- Circulation: 97,878 (as of September 2025)
- Sister newspapers: Daily Star Sunday
- ISSN: 0957-6231
- OCLC number: 751784276
- Website: dailystar.co.uk

The Daily Star is a tabloid newspaper published from Monday to Saturday in the United Kingdom since 1978. In 2002, a sister Sunday edition, Daily Star Sunday was launched with a separate staff. On 6 May 2020, The Star published its 10,000th issue. Ben Rankin is the Editor in Chief.

When the paper was launched from Manchester, it was circulated only in the North and Midlands. It was conceived by the then-owners of Express Newspapers, Trafalgar House, to take on the strength of the Daily Mirror and The Sun in the North. It was also intended to use the under-capacity of the Great Ancoats Street presses in Manchester as the Daily Express was losing circulation. The Daily Star sold out its first night print of 1,400,000. Its cover price has decreased over the years to compete with its rival The Sun.

The Daily Star is published by Reach plc. The paper has predominantly focused on stories revolving around celebrities, sport, and news/gossip about popular television programs, such as soap operas and reality TV shows, though in recent times has also criticised what it sees as woke culture.

== History ==
The Daily Star was originally created in 1978 as part of Express Newspapers to utilise printing presses that had been running under capacity due to falling Daily Express circulation. It was acquired in 2000 by Northern & Shell, and sold to Reach plc in 2018.

== Regular features ==
For over 40 years, the newspaper regularly featured a photograph of a topless glamour model (called a "Star Bird") on weekdays, in a similar vein to The Sun's former Page 3 feature. The feature discovered some well-known models, most notably Rachel ter Horst in 1993 and Lucy Pinder in 2003. In April 2019, the paper claimed it changed from publishing topless models on its third page to publishing clothed glamour images. It also claimed it was the last mainstream British tabloid to discontinue the tradition of printing topless images, after The Sun ended its own Page 3 feature in 2015. The paper's glamour photographer is Jeany Savage.

Other regular features in the Daily Star include Wired, a daily gossip column edited by James Cabooter, "Hot TV", a television news column edited by Ed Gleave and Peter Dyke, Mike Ward's weekly television review page and "Forum", a daily page devoted to readers' text messages, which are apparently printed verbatim. Opinion columns by Dominik Diamond and Vanessa Feltz were discontinued in 2008. Until he died in 2012, the chief football writer was Brian Woolnough, lured from The Sun in 2001 for a £200,000 pay packet.

The paper's leader column, entitled "The Daily Star Says", appears most days on Page 6.

== Controversies ==
=== Jeffrey Archer ===
In 1987, the newspaper lost a high-profile libel action brought by Jeffrey Archer, leading to an award of £500,000 in damages, over allegations of Archer's involvement with a prostitute, Monica Coghlan. The editor of the Daily Star, Lloyd Turner, was sacked six weeks after the trial. However, the newspaper always stood by its story, and on 19 July 2001 Archer was found guilty of perjury and perverting the course of justice at the 1987 trial and was sentenced to a total of four years' imprisonment. The paper later launched a bid to reclaim £2.2 million – the original payout plus interest and damages. In October 2002, it was reported that this action had been settled with an out of court payment of £1.5 million by Archer.

=== Hillsborough disaster ===
On 18 April 1989, three days after the Hillsborough disaster in which 97 Liverpool fans were fatally injured at an FA Cup semi-final game, the Daily Star ran the front-page headline "Dead Fans Robbed by Drunk Thugs", alleging that Liverpool fans had stolen from fans injured or killed in the tragedy. These allegations, along with claims that fans had also attacked police officers aiding the injured, were published in several other newspapers, though it was the content of coverage by The Sun — particularly a front-page article on 19 April — that caused the most controversy. A later inquiry showed all of the claims made were false.

=== Madeleine McCann ===
Both the Daily Star and its Sunday equivalent, as well as its stablemates the Daily Express and Sunday Express, featured heavy coverage of the disappearance of Madeleine McCann in May 2007. In 2008, the McCann family sued the Star and Express for libel. The action concerned more than 100 stories across the Daily Express, Daily Star and their Sunday equivalents, which accused the McCanns of involvement in their daughter's disappearance. The newspapers' coverage was regarded by the McCanns as grossly defamatory. In a settlement at the High Court of Justice, the newspapers agreed to run a front-page apology to the McCanns on 19 March 2008, publish another apology on the front pages of the Sunday editions on 23 March and make a statement of apology at the High Court. They also agreed to pay costs and substantial damages, which the McCanns plan to use to aid their search for their daughter. The Daily Star apologised for printing "stories suggesting the couple were responsible for, or may be responsible for, the death of their daughter Madeleine and for covering it up" and stated that "We now recognise that such a suggestion is absolutely untrue and that Kate and Gerry are completely innocent of any involvement in their daughter's disappearance".

=== Volcanic ash front page ===
On 21 April 2010, in the aftermath of the 2010 Eyjafjallajökull eruption, the Star published a computer-generated image on its front page of British Airways Flight 9, which in 1982 encountered volcanic ash and suffered the temporary loss of all engines. The image, taken from a documentary, was accompanied by a headline "Terror as plane hits ash cloud", without any indication on the front page that the image was computer-generated. The splash, on the first day that flights restarted after a six-day closure of UK airspace due to volcanic ash, led to the removal of the paper from newsagents at some UK airports.

=== Grand Theft Auto Rothbury ===
On 21 July 2010, the paper ran a story by Jerry Lawton claiming that Rockstar Games was planning an installment of its Grand Theft Auto series of video games based around the then-recent shootings carried out by Raoul Moat. Amid outcry at the inaccuracy of the story, an apology was published by the paper on 24 July for making no attempt to verify the truth of any of the claims, publishing what was claimed to be the cover, criticising Rockstar for its alleged plans without questioning the likelihood, making no attempt to contact Rockstar before publishing, and obtaining statements from a grieving relative of one of Moat's victims. The paper claimed to have paid "substantial" damages to Rockstar as a result, which Rockstar donated to charity.

Prior to the paper's apology, Lawton defended his story on his Facebook page, claiming to be "baffled by the fury of adult gamers", describing them as "grown (?!?) men who sit around all day playing computer games with one another". He then added "Think I'll challenge them to a virtual reality duel....stab....I win!".

=== Richard Peppiatt resignation ===
In March 2011, reporter Richard Peppiatt quit the Daily Star after accusing them of Islamophobic and pro-English Defence League (EDL) coverage: "The lies of a newspaper in London can get a bloke's head caved-in down an alley in Bradford". He admitted to writing false stories about celebrities and alleged they were ordered by superiors. All of his allegations were denied by the newspaper.

=== Dwayne "The Rock" Johnson interview fabrication ===
On 11 January 2019, the paper published a front-page article, in which it is claimed that Dwayne "The Rock" Johnson had stated "generation snowflake or, whatever you want to call them, are actually putting us backwards", referring to the millennial generation, and "if you are not agreeing with them then they are offended – and that is not what so many great men and women fought for". In response, Dwayne Johnson stated that the article was "completely untrue, 100% fabricated", and "never took place" through his Instagram and Twitter pages, later causing the Daily Star to take the article offline.

=== Five inch naval gun ===
On 29 July 2016, the paper published an article saying that the Ministry of Defence spent "183 Million Pounds for a Five Inch Gun" for the Royal Navy. They further quoted the MOD as saying it was "A good value for the taxpayers." The article criticised the MOD about a naval gun the "size of a toothbrush." The Star was mistakenly thinking the length of the barrel was 5 inches (13 cm), although this was actually the calibre, the diameter of the barrel. The article was later corrected.

== Liz Truss lettuce publicity stunt ==
On 14 October 2022, the Daily Star set up a livestream on whether or not Liz Truss's premiership would outlast the ten-day shelf life of a lettuce, after The Economist described her as having "the shelf-life of a lettuce" amidst a government crisis. When Truss announced her resignation six days later on 20 October, it was played on the stream followed by "God Save the King" and celebratory music, declaring that "the lettuce outlasted Liz Truss".

== Editors ==
- 2 November 1978 – 1980: Peter Grimsditch
- 1980: Derek Jameson, who had been editor-in-chief since the launch
- 1980–July 1987: Lloyd Turner
- 1987: Mike Gabbert (Note: He was brought in to take the paper downmarket, which he did, briefly including content from the Sunday Sport under the name Daily Star Sport (this was before the Daily Sport launched). He had a very short tenure as circulation dropped dramatically. He was the journalist who had exposed the Sheffield Wednesday trio of Peter Swan, David Layne and Tony Kay for match fixing in the 1960s.)
- 1987–1994: Brian Hitchen
- 1994–1998: Phil Walker
- 1998–2003: Peter Hill
- 2003–2 March 2018: Dawn Neesom
- 2 March 2018 – 3 March 2025: Jon Clark
- 3 March 2025 – present: Ben Rankin

== Political allegiance ==
The paper was originally created with a pro-Labour stance. Ahead of the 2014 Scottish independence referendum, the Scottish edition named the Daily Star of Scotland printed articles in support of the Better Together campaign. In a retrospective of the newspaper in 2018, journalist and former Daily Star features editor Roy Greenslade described the publication under the ownership of Richard Desmond as being "a newspaper without either news or views. If it can be said to have any political outlook at all, then it is rightwing. There is no passion, no commitment, no soul."

Since being taken over by Reach in 2018 and under the editorship of Jon Clark, the publication has taken a more humour-focused direction, with Ian Burrell of the i newspaper describing the publication in 2020 as an "unlikely source of satire" contrasting it with the paper under the prior ownership of Desmond, which he described as a "mostly a sordid product that objectified women and obsessed over reality TV". Clark described the publication's political position thus: "We have no interest in whether you are a Tory or a Labour supporter but I want our elected leaders to do right by the electorate and they are not, they are lying to us. The best way to hold them to account is by taking the piss out of them. It's hard to come back from being a figure of fun."

== See also ==
- Beau Peep
