= Peter Hill (journalist) =

British journalist

- Born: 6 April 1945 (age 81); Oldham, Lancashire, England
- Education: Hulme Grammar School
- Alma mater: University of Manchester
- Occupation: Journalist
- Employer(s): Daily Star; Daily Express

Peter Hill (born 6 April 1945) is a British journalist and a former editor of the Daily Express.

== Early life and career ==
Hill was born on 6 April 1945 in Oldham, Lancashire. Raised in Saddleworth, he left Hulme Grammar School at 15 and worked in a woollen mill before gaining employment in local papers in Yorkshire and the North West. He was a sub-editor on The Daily Telegraph by 1969, but entered higher education in 1976 when he began a degree at Manchester University in American Studies and political philosophy, but left after an attempt to drop the former subject was rejected. While doing his course he had continued to work in the newspaper industry at weekends, and returned to full-time employment by joining the newly launched Daily Star newspaper as a sub-editor.

Rising in status over the next two decades, he was appointed editor of the Daily Star in October 1998 by Lord Hollick, the former owner of Express newspapers, Hill increased the Star's circulation from 540,000 to 928,000, launched Daily Star Sunday, and became a What the Papers Say editor of the year award winner in January 2003. Developing a positive professional relationship with Richard Desmond, after he had taken over Express Newspapers, led to a television advertising campaign, new sections, and the poaching of a football writer Brian Woolnough from The Sun whose salary at £200,000 was greater than Hills.

== Editor of the Daily Express ==
Hill became editor of the Daily Express in December 2003, taking over from Chris Williams. Reportedly Hill alone, with Desmond's consent, chose to return the publication to being supportive of the Conservatives after its period of support for New Labour while owned by Lord Hollick and during the early Desmond years. During his time as editor, Hill continued his newspaper's preoccupation with the death of the Princess of Wales and immigration, both editorial policies he thinks justifiable. Referring to the attitudes of his readers he was clear in a February 2011 Press Gazette interview: "I know they absolutely detest everything to do with the European Union. I know they're deeply concerned about the enormous levels of immigration which have gone unchecked. I know they detest the idea of multiculturalism which is ghettoising the country." On the Diana stories he was quoted by The Independent newspaper in 2006 as saying: "I can tell you that people want to read about the Diana conspiracy because the figures tell me that they do ...the more we write [the articles], the more they are turning out to be true."

One story the newspaper covered during Hill's tenure landed the publication with a successful claim for damages, the paper's insistence that the parents of Madeleine McCann were responsible for their daughter's disappearance and other defamatory articles finally numbering about a hundred. This story was reportedly Hill's "obsession" in this period. Hill said in February 2011: "I did too much on the story. I accept that."

His last day as Express editor was on 18 February 2011.

== In public and professional role ==
Peter Hill was a member of the Press Complaints Commission from September 2003 until May 2008, a few months after the case brought by the McCanns; his role had been under review. Appearing before the House of Commons culture, media and sport select committee in April 2009 he referred to the legal constraints imposed on newspapers: "We do not have a free press in this country by any means; we have a very, very shackled press in this country. Really you should be looking at means of removing those shackles not imposing more of them..."

Media offices
Preceded by Phil Walker	Editor of the Daily Star; 1998–2003	Succeeded by Dawn Neesom
Preceded by Chris Williams	Editor of the Daily Express; 2003–2011	Succeeded by Hugh Whittow
