= Sheila Hutchins =

English writer

- Born: 11 April 1913; Cheshire, England
- Died: 2 July 1990 (aged 77); Sussex, England
- Occupation: Writer
- Writing career
- Genre: Non-fiction
- Subject: Food

Sheila Hutchins (11 April 1913 – 2 July 1990) was an English writer. She was Cookery Editor of the Daily Express and published many books, notably English Recipes (Methuen, 1967) and Grannie's Kitchen, a series of books covering the regional cookery of England. Her light, anecdotal, witty style was accompanied by a deep knowledge of her subject.

Hutchins died in 1990, aged 77.
