= Classic Boat =

British boating magazine

Classic Boat is a British traditional boating magazine published by the Chelsea Magazine Company. It was first published in 1987 and defines classic boats as "boats which endure". It was the first magazine in the UK dedicated to traditional boats and boating.

The magazine covers boats of all sizes and type, from any era, and made from any material. It claims to take inspiration from, and provide inspiration for, all builders and users of beautiful boats, as well as trying to dispel the myth that maintaining an old wooden boat consumes huge amounts of time and money. It has been edited since 2000 by Dan Houston, a lifelong wooden boat sailor and restorer. It features the world's most beautiful classic yachts and traditional work boats, as well as news, opinions, reviews, reports and features from around the world. It also shows how restorations are done using practical articles as well as how to look after older boats. There is regatta coverage of the growing number of events for traditional boats. It aims to appeal to those who love wood and varnish, or the look and feel of well-drawn and well-built boats. In 2010 the magazine interviewed Peter Gregson, owner of the UK's only classic wooden boat brokers

== Website ==
The Chelsea Magazine Company acquired Classic Boat from IPC Media in 2010. Since then, the website has undergone a major relaunch. The new website covers restoration advice, image galleries of classic yachts, buying and selling of boats and now incorporates the Classic Boat forum.

Publisher, Luke Bilton said: "The new-look ClassicBoat.co.uk finally does justice to our subject matter and is the home of beautiful boats online."
