= The Retail Ombudsman (United Kingdom) =

- Formation: Operational: January 2015
- Type: Ombudsman
- Headquarters: London
- Location: United Kingdom
- Chief Ombudsman: Dean Dunham

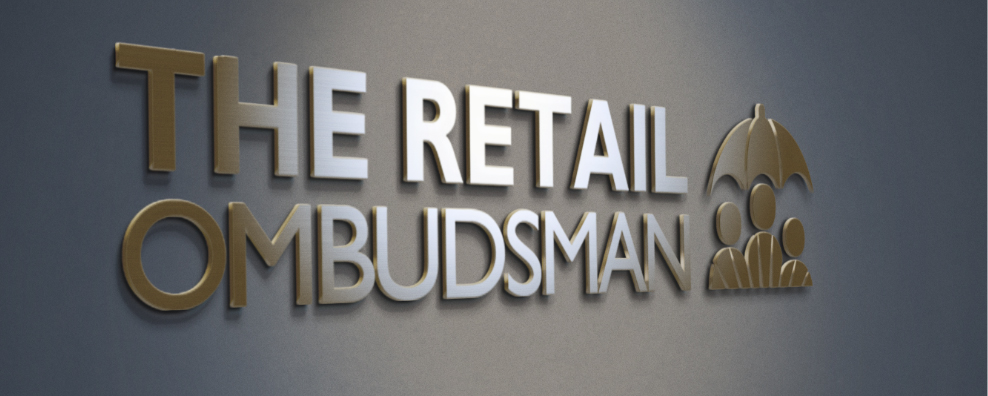
The Retail Ombudsman logo

The Retail Ombudsman (TRO) was an Ombudsman for the retail industry in the United Kingdom from January 2015 to July 2017. Its role was to resolve disputes between retailers and retail customers.

== Background ==
In July 2015 The EU Alternative Dispute Resolution Directive was planned to come into force. It was delayed until 1 October 2015 in line with the Consumer Rights Act 2015. Under the new system companies are obliged to point customers to private complaints-handling companies but would not be bound by their decisions unless they agreed to subscribe to the ADR scheme. This directive allowed for more private companies to handle consumer complaints in sectors including retail, aviation, furniture and property.

On 1 January 2015, barrister Dean Dunham started as the Chief Ombudsman at the Retail Ombudsman.

== Establishment ==
The Retail Ombudsman was a retail alternative dispute resolution (ADR) scheme, and was set up to resolve disputes between shops and customers. During its first weekend in business, the Retail Ombudsman claimed to have received more than 300 complaints.

Sir Eric Peacock was chairman of the Retail Ombudsman.

It also set up a product recall website in June 2016. It was removed some months after the change in Ombudsman status.

== Status ==
In July 2017, the Retail Ombudsman resigned its membership of the Ombudsman Association (the trade association for ombudsmen in the UK), and changed its name to RetailADR.

In May 2018, Which? reported that the Ombudsman Association allowed The Retail Ombudsman to call itself an ombudsman for more than a year before investigating and that The Retail Ombudsman ‘did not meet the OA’s membership criteria for independence, fairness, effectiveness, openness and transparency, and accountability’ and did not complete the re-validation process before TRO resigned.

It also implied that Sainsbury's, Tesco and others were members by using their logos in the 2015 Annual report.
