= John Gordon (journalist) =

John Rutherford Gordon (8 December 1890 – 9 December 1974) was a Scottish newspaper editor and columnist.

Born in Dundee, Gordon began work on the Dundee Advertiser in 1904. He was rapidly promoted, and by the end of the decade was overseeing the Perthshire and Dundee editions of the People's Journal. In 1911, he moved to the London office of the Dundee Advertiser, then the London office of the Glasgow Herald. During World War I, he served with the King's Royal Rifle Corps.

At the end of the war, Gordon took work with the Evening News, then in 1922 he moved to become Chief Sub-editor of the Daily Express. Editor Beverley Baxter promised to increase his wages, but forgot, and Gordon resigned. However, owner Lord Beaverbrook was keen to retain Gordon, and appointed him editor of the Sunday Express in 1928. Between 1928 and 1952, Gordon raised circulation of the Sunday Express from 450,000 to 3.2 million. In 1930, he commissioned R. H. Naylor to write a horoscope for the birth of Princess Margaret. This proved popular, and Gordon retained it as a regular feature – the first regular newspaper horoscope.

In 1952, Gordon was made editor-in-chief of the paper, and all real editorial power was removed from him. He instead focussed on writing a newspaper column covering current events. In one column in 1953 he criticised Sir John Gielgud, who had been fined £10 by magistrates for importuning, and saw the incident as an example of "moral rot" and suggested such "social lepers" should be completely ignored.

Media offices
Preceded by James Douglas	Editor of the Sunday Express with James Douglas 1928–1931; 1928–1952	Succeeded by Harold Keeble
