= Daily Express =

British middle market newspaper

- The paper that stands for real values

- Front page, 5 January 2026
- Type: Daily newspaper
- Format: Tabloid
- Owner: Reach plc
- Editor: Geoffery Maynard
- Founded: 24 April 1900; 126 years ago
- Political alignment: Conservative; Right-wing politics
- Headquarters: One Canada Square, London, E14 United Kingdom
- Circulation: 102,884 (as of December 2025)
- ISSN: 0307-0174
- OCLC number: 173337077
- Website: express.co.uk the-express.com

The Daily Express is a national daily United Kingdom middle-market newspaper printed in tabloid format. Published in London, it is the flagship of Express Newspapers, owned by publisher Reach plc. In June 2022, it had an average daily circulation of 201,608.

The Express was first published as a broadsheet in 1900 by Arthur Pearson. Its sister paper, the Sunday Express, was launched in 1918. Under the ownership of Lord Beaverbrook, it rose to become the newspaper with the largest circulation in the world, going from 2 million in the 1930s to 4 million in the 1940s. It was acquired by Richard Desmond's company Northern & Shell in 2000. Hugh Whittow was the editor from February 2011 until he retired in March 2018. In February 2018 Trinity Mirror acquired the Daily Express, and other publishing assets of Northern & Shell, in a deal worth £126.7 million. To coincide with the purchase the Trinity Mirror group changed the name of the company to Reach. Hugh Whittow resigned as editor and Gary Jones took over as editor-in-chief soon after the purchase.

The paper's editorial stances have often been seen as aligned to Euroscepticism and supportive of the UK Independence Party (UKIP), and other right-wing factions including the European Research Group (ERG) of the Conservative Party.

== History ==
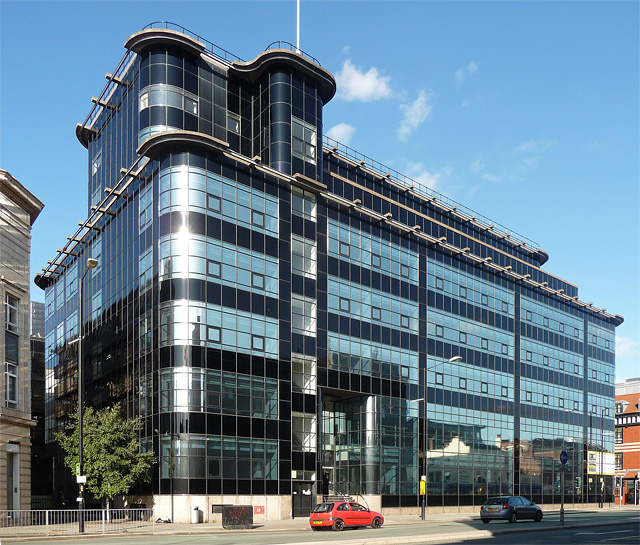
Exterior of Owen Williams's Daily Express Building in Manchester

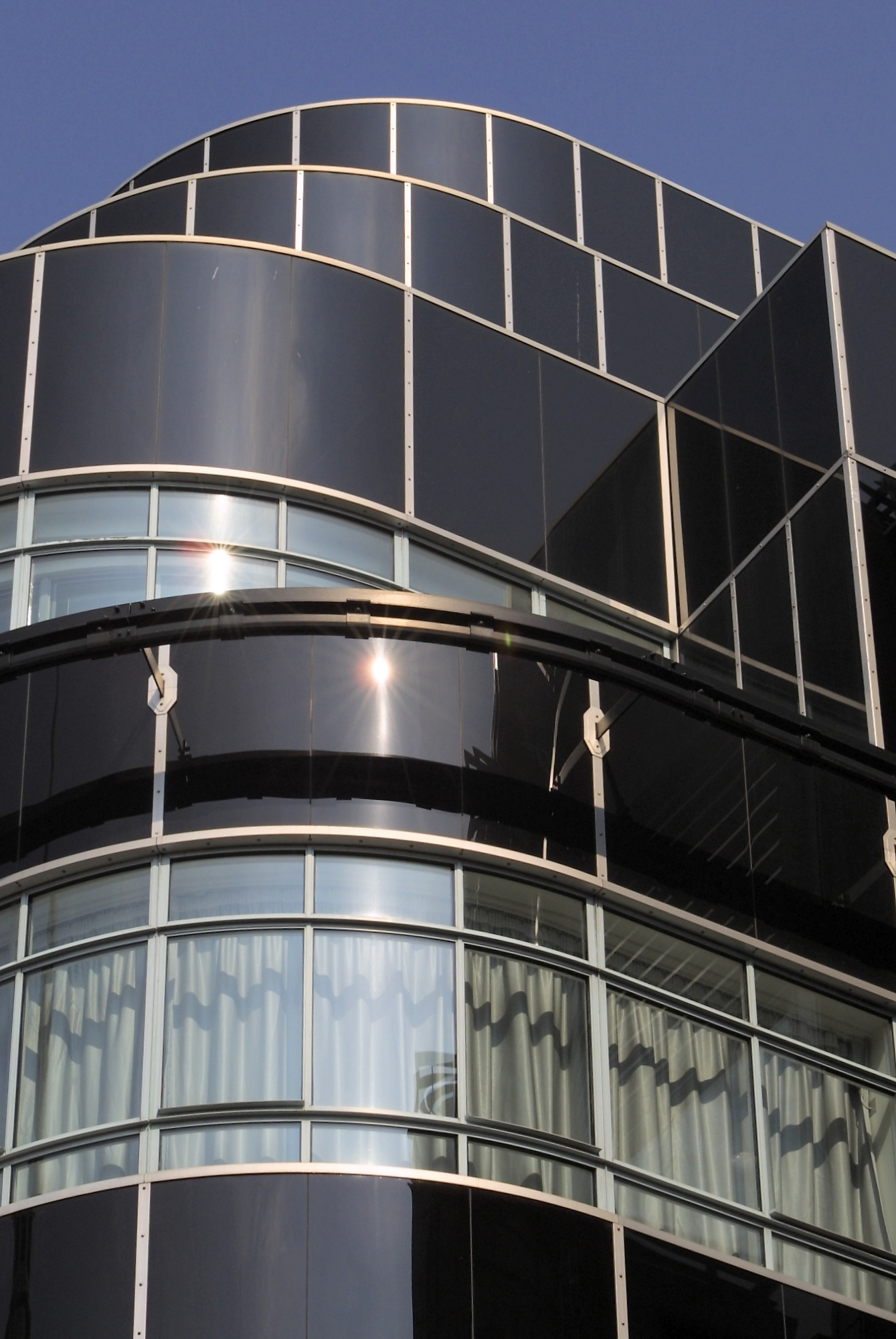
Exterior of Daily Express Building in London, designed by Ellis and Clark

The Daily Express was founded in 1900 by Sir Arthur Pearson, with the first issue appearing on 24 April 1900. Pearson lost his sight to glaucoma in 1913, and sold the title in 1916 to Max Aitken, MP for Ashton-under-Lyne and the future Lord Beaverbrook. The Daily Express was one of the first papers to place news instead of advertisements on its front page, and also carried gossip, sport, and women's features. Aitken and his family moved to London in 1910 where he was knighted in 1911 and became a peer in 1916. As the recently titled Lord Beaverbrook, he launched the Sunday Express in 1919, sister paper to the Daily Express. It was also the first newspaper in Britain to have a crossword puzzle, introduced in 1924, while the Sunday Express was the first sunday newspaper to include one.

The Daily Express and Sunday Express production was expanded by opening presses in Manchester & Glasgow in 1927, and in 1931 moved its headquarters to the Daily Express Building, 120 Fleet Street, London, a specially commissioned Art Deco building. Under Beaverbrook, the paper set newspaper sales records several times throughout the 1930s. Its success was partly due to aggressive marketing campaign and a circulation war with other populist newspapers. Arthur Christiansen became editor in October 1933. Under his direction sales climbed from two million in 1936 to four million in 1949. He retired in 1957. The paper also featured Alfred Bestall's Rupert Bear cartoon and satirical cartoons by Carl Giles which it began publishing in the 1940s. On 24 March 1933, a front-page headline, "Judea Declares War on Germany" (because of the Anti-Nazi boycott of 1933), was published.

During the late 1930s, the paper advocated the appeasement policies of Neville Chamberlain's National Government, due to the influence of Lord Beaverbrook. On 7 August 1939, the front-page headline was "NO WAR THIS YEAR", yet less than a month later, Britain and France were at war with Nazi Germany following its invasion of Poland. The front page, floating in dirty water, later featured in In Which We Serve. The ruralist and fascist author Henry Williamson wrote for the paper on many occasions over a span of half a century. He also wrote for the Sunday Express at the beginning of his career.

In 1938 the publication moved its Manchester production to the Daily Express Building, Manchester (nicknamed the "Black Lubyianka"), designed by Owen Williams on the same site in Great Ancoats Street. It opened a similar building in Glasgow in 1936 in Albion Street. Glasgow printing ended in 1974, and the Manchester company presses closed in 1989.

Beaverbrook was attacked in March 1962 in the House of Commons for running "a sustained vendetta" against the British royal family in the Express titles. In the same month, the Duke of Edinburgh described the Express as "a bloody awful newspaper. It is full of lies, scandal and imagination. It is a vicious paper." At the height of Beaverbrook's control, in 1948, he told a Royal Commission on the press that he ran his papers "purely for the purpose of making propaganda". The arrival of television, and the public's changing interests, took their toll on circulation, and following Beaverbrook's death in 1964, the paper's circulation declined for several years. During this period, the Express, practically alone among mainstream newspapers, was vehemently opposed to entry into what became the European Economic Community.

"[I run the paper] purely for the purpose of making propaganda and with no other motive".

— Lord Beaverbrook, former owner (1948).

Partially as a result of the rejuvenation of the Daily Mail under David English and the emergence of The Sun under Rupert Murdoch and editorship of Larry Lamb, average daily sales of the Express dropped below four million in 1967, below three million in 1975, and below two million in 1984. The Daily Express switched from broadsheet to tabloid in 1977 (the Mail having done so six years earlier), and was bought by the construction company Trafalgar House in the same year. Its publishing company, Beaverbrook Newspapers, was renamed Express Newspapers. In 1982, Trafalgar House spun off its publishing interests to a new company, Fleet Holdings, under Lord Matthews, but this succumbed to a hostile takeover by United Newspapers in 1985. Under United, the Express titles moved from Fleet Street to Blackfriars Road in 1989.

Express Newspapers was sold to publisher Richard Desmond in 2000, and the names of the newspapers reverted to Daily Express and Sunday Express.

=== Richard Desmond era ===
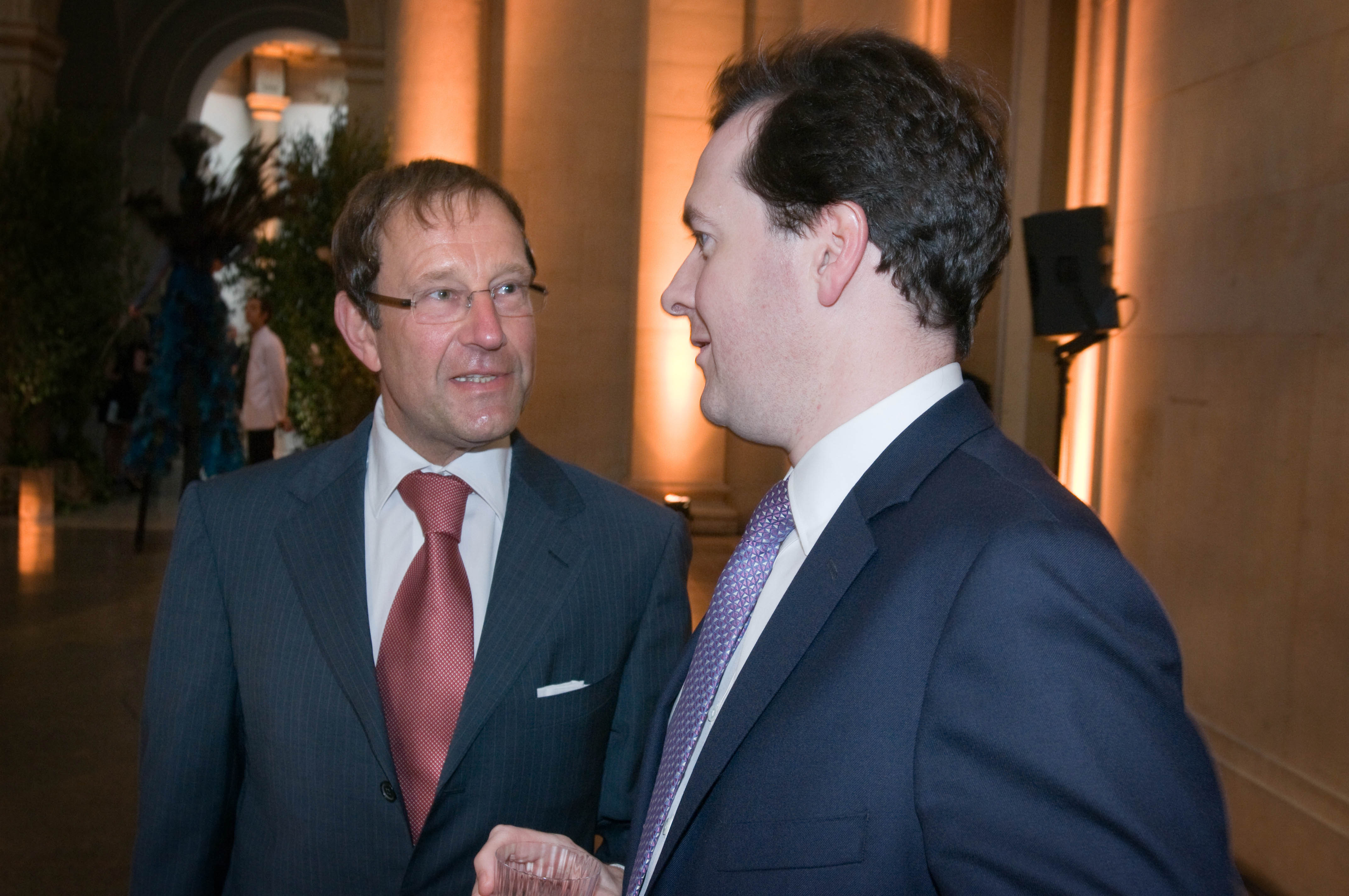
In 2000, Express Newspapers was bought by Richard Desmond (left).

In 2000, Express Newspapers was bought by Richard Desmond, publisher of celebrity magazine OK!, for £125 million. Controversy surrounded the deal since Desmond also owned softcore pornography magazines. As a result, many staff left, including editor Rosie Boycott and columnist Peter Hitchens. Hitchens moved to The Mail on Sunday, saying working for the new owner was a moral conflict of interest since he had always attacked the pornographic magazines that Desmond published. Despite their divergent politics, Desmond respected Hitchens. In 2004, the newspaper moved to Lower Thames Street in the City of London. In February 2018, it moved into One Canada Square in Canary Wharf.

On 31 October 2005, UK Media Group Entertainment Rights secured majority interest from the Daily Express for Rupert Bear. They paid £6 million for a 66.6% control of the character. The Express retains minority interest of one-third plus the right to publish Rupert Bear stories in certain Express publications.

In 2007, Express Newspapers left the National Publishers Association due to unpaid fees. Since payments to the NPA fund the Press Complaints Commission, it was deemed possible that the Express and its sister papers would cease being regulated by the PCC. The chairman of the Press Standards Board of Finance, which manages PCC funds, described Express Newspapers as a "rogue publisher".

The Express group lost prominent libel cases in 2008–2009; it paid damages to people involved in the Madeleine McCann case (see below), a member of the Muslim Council of Britain, footballer Marco Materazzi, and sports agent Willie McKay. The losses led the media commentator Roy Greenslade to conclude that Express Newspapers (which also publishes the Star titles) paid more in libel damages over that period than any other newspaper group. Although most of the individual amounts paid were not disclosed, the total damages were recorded at £1,570,000. Greenslade characterised Desmond as a "rogue proprietor".

In late 2008, Express Newspapers began cutting 80 jobs to reduce costs by £2.5 million; however, too few staff were willing to take voluntary redundancy. In early 2008, a previous cost-cutting exercise triggered the first 24-hour national press strike in the UK for 18 years. In late August 2009 came plans for a further 70 redundancies, affecting journalists across Express Newspapers (including the Daily and Sunday Express, the Daily Star, and the Daily Star Sunday).

In August 2009, the Advertising Standards Authority criticised the company for advertorials as features alongside adverts for the same products. The ASA noted that the pieces were "always and uniquely favourable to the product featured in the ads and contained claims that have been or were likely to be prohibited in advertisements".

In January 2010, the Daily Express was censured by the Advertising Standards Authority over a front-page promotion for "free" fireworks. This led to comment that the Express has become "the Ryanair of Fleet Street", in that it is a "frequent offender" which pays little heed to the ASA's criticisms.

In May 2010, Desmond announced a commitment of £100 million over five years to buy new equipment for the printing plants, beginning with the immediate purchase of four new presses, amid industry rumours that he was going to establish a printing plant at Luton.

On 31 December 2010, the Express, with all the media titles in Desmond's Northern & Shell group, were excluded from the Press Complaints Commission after withholding payment. Lord Black, chairman of PressBof, the PCC's parent organisation, called this "a deeply regrettable decision". According to Press Gazette, in December 2016 circulation figures showed gross sales of the Daily Mail were 1,491,264 compared to 391,626 for the Daily Express.

The full run of the Daily Express has been digitised and is available at UK Press Online.

Johnston Press secured a five-year deal, beginning in March 2015, to print the northern editions of the Daily Express, Daily Star, Sunday Express and the Daily Star Sunday at its Dinnington site in Sheffield. The Scottish edition is printed by facsimile in Glasgow by contract printers, the London editions at Westferry Printers in Luton.

In September 2017, Daily Mirror publisher Trinity Mirror announced its interest in buying all of Express Newspapers from Desmond. The Financial Times called it potentially the biggest change in the British newspaper industry for a decade.

=== Reach era ===
In February 2018, Trinity Mirror acquired the Daily Express, and other publishing assets of Northern & Shell, in a deal worth £126.7 million. To coincide with the purchase the Trinity Mirror group changed its name to Reach. Hugh Whittow resigned as editor and Gary Jones took over as editor-in-chief soon after the purchase.

The Daily Express endorsed Liz Truss in the July–September 2022 Conservative Party leadership election.

In 2023, Reach launched a US version of the Express, called the-express.com. It is based in New York City.

In November 2025, the Express offered compensation to two freelancers after the Express was accused of plagiarizing their work.

== Sunday Express ==
Front page of the Sunday Express, 4 January 2026

The printing press of the Sunday Express was first started by Lady Diana Manners on 29 December 1918. It was edited by Michael Booker from 2018 to 2021 when he left for GB News. Its circulation in September 2025 was 93,754.

== Controversies ==
=== John Bodkin Adams ===
Suspected serial killer John Bodkin Adams was arrested in 1956, accused of murdering up to 400 wealthy patients in Eastbourne. The press, "egged on by police leaks, unanimously declared Adams guilty", except for Percy Hoskins, chief crime reporter for the Express. Hoskins was adamant that Adams was a naive doctor prosecuted by an overzealous detective, Herbert Hannam, whom Hoskins disliked from previous cases. The Express, under Hoskins's direction, was the only major paper to defend Adams, causing Lord Beaverbrook to question Hoskins's stance.

Adams was cleared in 1957 of the murder of Edith Alice Morrell (a second count was withdrawn controversially). After the case, Beaverbrook phoned Hoskins and said: "Two people were acquitted today", meaning Hoskins as well. The Express carried an exclusive interview with Adams, whom Hoskins interviewed in a safe house away from other newspapers. According to archives released in 2003, Adams was thought by police to have killed 163 patients.

=== Dunblane ===
On 8 March 2009, the Scottish edition of the Sunday Express published a front-page article critical of survivors of the 1996 Dunblane massacre, entitled "Anniversary Shame of Dunblane Survivors". The article criticised the 18-year-old survivors for posting "shocking blogs and photographs of themselves on the internet", revealing that they drank alcohol, made rude gestures and talked about their sex lives. The article provoked complaints, leading to a front-page apology a fortnight later. The Press Complaints Commission described the article as a "serious error of judgement" and said, "Although the editor had taken steps to resolve the complaint, and rightly published an apology, the breach of the Code was so serious that no apology could remedy it".

=== Diana, Princess of Wales ===
The Daily Express gained a reputation for printing conspiracy theories about the death of Diana, Princess of Wales as front-page news. The Independent and The Guardian in 2006 both published a selection of then recent Express headlines on the topic. This practice was satirised in Private Eye as the Diana Express or the Di'ly Express, and has been attributed to Desmond's friendship with regular Eye target Mohamed Fayed. (Note: For instance in the "Hackwatch" column of Private Eye #1174, 19 December 2006.) The articles regularly quoted Fayed with the newspaper describing its campaign as "Our relentless crusade for the truth". In 2006 and 2007, these front-page stories consistently appeared on Mondays, and ended only when the paper focused instead on the Madeleine McCann story (see below).

According to The Independent in 2006: "The Diana stories appear on Mondays because Sunday is often a quiet day." In February and March 2010, the paper returned to featuring Diana stories on the front page on Mondays.

In September 2013, following an allegation raised by the estranged wife of an SAS operative, the Daily Express returned to running daily Princess Diana cover stories.

=== Madeleine McCann ===
In the second half of 2007 the Daily Express gave a large coverage to the disappearance of Madeleine McCann. From 3 August 2007 to 10 November 2007, the Express dedicated at least part of the next 100 front pages to her. Of those, 82 used the headline to feature the details of the disappearance (often stylised by "MADELEINE" in red block capitals, plus a picture of the child).

Though the family initially said some journalists may have "overstepped their mark" they acknowledged the benefits in keeping the case in the public eye, but said coverage needed to be toned down since daily headlines were not necessarily helpful. In March 2008, the McCanns launched a libel suit against the Daily Express and the Daily Star, as well as their Sunday equivalents, following their coverage. The action concerned more than 100 stories across the four newspapers, which accused the McCanns of causing and covering up their daughter's death. Express Newspapers pulled all references to Madeleine from its websites.

In a settlement at the High Court of Justice, the newspapers ran a front-page apology to the McCanns on 19 March 2008, another apology on the front of the Sunday editions of 23 March and a statement of apology at the High Court. The newspapers also agreed to pay costs and damages, which the McCanns said they would use to fund the search for their daughter. Guardian media commentator Roy Greenslade said it was "unprecedented" for four major newspapers to offer front-page apologies but also said it was more than warranted given that the papers had committed "a substantial libel" that shamed the British press. Craig Silverman of Regret the Error, a blog that reports media errors, argued that given how many of the stories appeared on the front page, anything less than a front-page apology would have been "unacceptable".

In its apology, the Express said "a number of articles in the newspaper have suggested that the couple caused the death of their missing daughter Madeleine and then covered it up. We acknowledge that there is no evidence whatsoever to support this theory and that Kate and Gerry are completely innocent of any involvement in their daughter's disappearance." This was followed in October by an apology and payout (forwarded to the fund again) to a group who had become known as the "Tapas Seven" in relation to the case.

=== Accusations of xenophobia and hate speech ===
In 2013, the paper launched a "crusade" against new European Union rules on migrants from Bulgaria and Romania, inviting readers to sign a petition against lifting restrictions on immigration. The front page on Thursday 31 October declared: "Britain is full and fed up. Today join your Daily Express Crusade to stop new flood of Romanian and Bulgarian migrants". The Aberystwyth University Student Union announced a ban on the sale of the paper. This ban was overturned in March 2016, following a student vote. UKIP Leader Nigel Farage declared that he had signed the "Crusade" petition, and urged others to do the same. Romanian politician Cătălin Ivan expressed "outrage" at the campaign.

In a statement released by The Office of the United Nations High Commissioner for Human Rights (OHCHR) on 24 April 2015, the tabloid's name was mentioned in an accusation of producing hate speech, initially referring to an article in The Sun: "...To give just one glimpse of the scale of the problem, back in 2003 the Daily Express ran 22 negative front pages stories about asylum seekers and refugees in a single 31-day period" ... "..the High Commissioner noted that Article 20 of the ICCPR, as well as elements relating to hate speech in the International Convention on the Elimination of All Forms of Racial Discrimination* (both of which have been ratified by the UK, as well as by all other EU countries), were rooted in the desire to outlaw the type of anti-Semitic and other racially based hate speech used by the Nazi media during the 1930s".

Appearing in April 2018 before Parliament's Home Affairs Select Committee, which was investigating the treatment of minority groups in print media, Daily Express editor Gary Jones said that he would be looking to change the tone of the paper. Jones said that he had found past pages of the newspaper "downright offensive", adding that they made him feel "very uncomfortable" and contributed to an "Islamophobic sentiment" in the media.

== Editors ==
=== Daily Express ===
- Arthur Pearson (April 1900 – 1901)
- Bertram Fletcher Robinson (July 1900 – May 1904)
- R. D. Blumenfeld (1904–1929)
- Beverley Baxter (1929 – October 1933)
- Arthur Christiansen (1933 – August 1957)
- Edward Pickering (1957–1961)
- Robert Edwards (acting) (November 1961 – February 1962)
- Roger Wood (1962 – May 1963)
- Robert Edwards (1963 – July 1965)
- Derek Marks (1965 – April 1971)
- Ian McColl (1971 – October 1974)
- Alastair Burnet (1974 – March 1976)
- Roy Wright (1976 – August 1977)
- Derek Jameson (1977 – June 1980)
- Arthur Firth (1980 – October 1981)
- Christopher Ward (1981 – April 1983)
- Sir Larry Lamb (1983 – April 1986)
- Sir Nicholas Lloyd (1986 – November 1995)
- Richard Addis (November 1995 – May 1998)
- Rosie Boycott (May 1998 – January 2001)
- Chris Williams (January 2001 – December 2003)
- Peter Hill (December 2003 – 18 February 2011)
- Hugh Whittow (18 February 2011 – March 2018)
- Gary Jones (March 2018 – September 2024)
- Tom Hunt (September 2024 – September 2025)
- Geoff Maynard (September 2025 – present)

=== Sunday Express ===
- 1920: James Douglas
- 1928: James Douglas and John Gordon
- 1931: John Gordon
- 1952: Harold Keeble
- 1954: John Junor
- 1986: Robin Esser
- 1989: Robin Morgan
- 1991: Eve Pollard
- 1994: Brian Hitchen
- 1995: Sue Douglas
- 1996: Richard Addis
- 1998: Amanda Platell
- 1999: Michael Pilgrim
- 2001: Martin Townsend
- 2018: Michael Booker
- 2022-2024: David Wooding

== Notable columnists and staff ==
=== Current ===
- Jasmine Birtles, has a daily column and writes regularly for The Independent
- Vanessa Feltz, columnist and journalist
- Adam Helliker, journalist and columnist
- Lucy Johnston, journalist and health editor
- Leo McKinstry, journalist, historian and author
- Ross Clark, journalist and author
- Richard and Judy, (Richard Madeley and Judy Finnigan), columnists
- Dean Dunham, consumer law columnist

=== Past ===
- Bertram Fletcher Robinson, journalist, chief war correspondent, day editor and editor
- H. V. Morton, journalist and travel writer
- J. B. Morton, better known as Beachcomber
- Basil Cardew
- Sefton Delmer
- Frederick Forsyth, novelist, journalist and political commentator
- G. E. R. Gedye
- Charles Graves
- William Hickey
- Peter Hitchens
- Sheila Hutchins, cookery editor
- Andrew Marr
- Jenni Murray
- Charles Gordon McClure (1885–1933), also known as Dyke White, cartoonist
- Veronica Papworth
- Yvonne Ridley
- Jean Rook
- Michael Watts ('Inspector Watts')
- Dame Barbara Cartland
- Ann Widdecombe, writer and politician

== Political allegiance ==
With the exception of the 2001 general election when it backed the Labour Party, and the 2015 general election when it backed the UK Independence Party, the newspaper has declared its support for the Conservative Party at every general election since World War II. In 2011, when the newspaper first endorsed UKIP, it became one of the first media outlets in the United Kingdom to demand a withdrawal from the European Union.

Election	Endorsement
1945	Conservative
1951	Conservative
1955	Conservative
1959	Conservative
1964	Conservative
1966	Conservative
1970	Conservative
February 1974	Conservative
October 1974	Conservative
1979	Conservative
1983	Conservative
1987	Conservative
1992	Conservative
1997	Conservative
2001	Labour
2005	Conservative
2010	Conservative
2015	UKIP
2017	Conservative
2019	Conservative
2024	Conservative

=== "Crusade for Freedom" ===
"Crusade for Freedom" was the newspaper's own campaign to give the people of the United Kingdom the opportunity to add their names to a petition addressed to the prime minister of the United Kingdom in favour of Britain's withdrawal from the European Union. Each edition of the 8 January 2011 issue had four cut-out vouchers where readers could sign the pledge and send them to the paper's HQ where the petition was being compiled; there were also further editions with the same voucher included. The campaign attracted the support of many celebrities including sportsman/TV personality Ian Botham as well as J D Wetherspoon chairman Tim Martin, who both gave interviews for 8 January's special edition of the paper. The first week of the campaign saw a response of around 370,000 signatures being received (just over 50% of daily readership or around 0.6% of the UK population).

== See also ==
- Right-wing populism
- Scottish Daily News
