= Chris Williams (journalist) =

- Born: 1951 or 1952 (age 73–74)
- Occupation: Executive editor of Scottish Daily Mail

Chris Williams (born 1951/1952) is a British journalist.

A former editor of the Daily Express, he is currently editor of the Scottish Daily Mail.

Media offices
Preceded by Rosie Boycott	Editor of The Daily Express; 2001 – 2003	Succeeded by Peter Hill
