= James Douglas (journalist) =

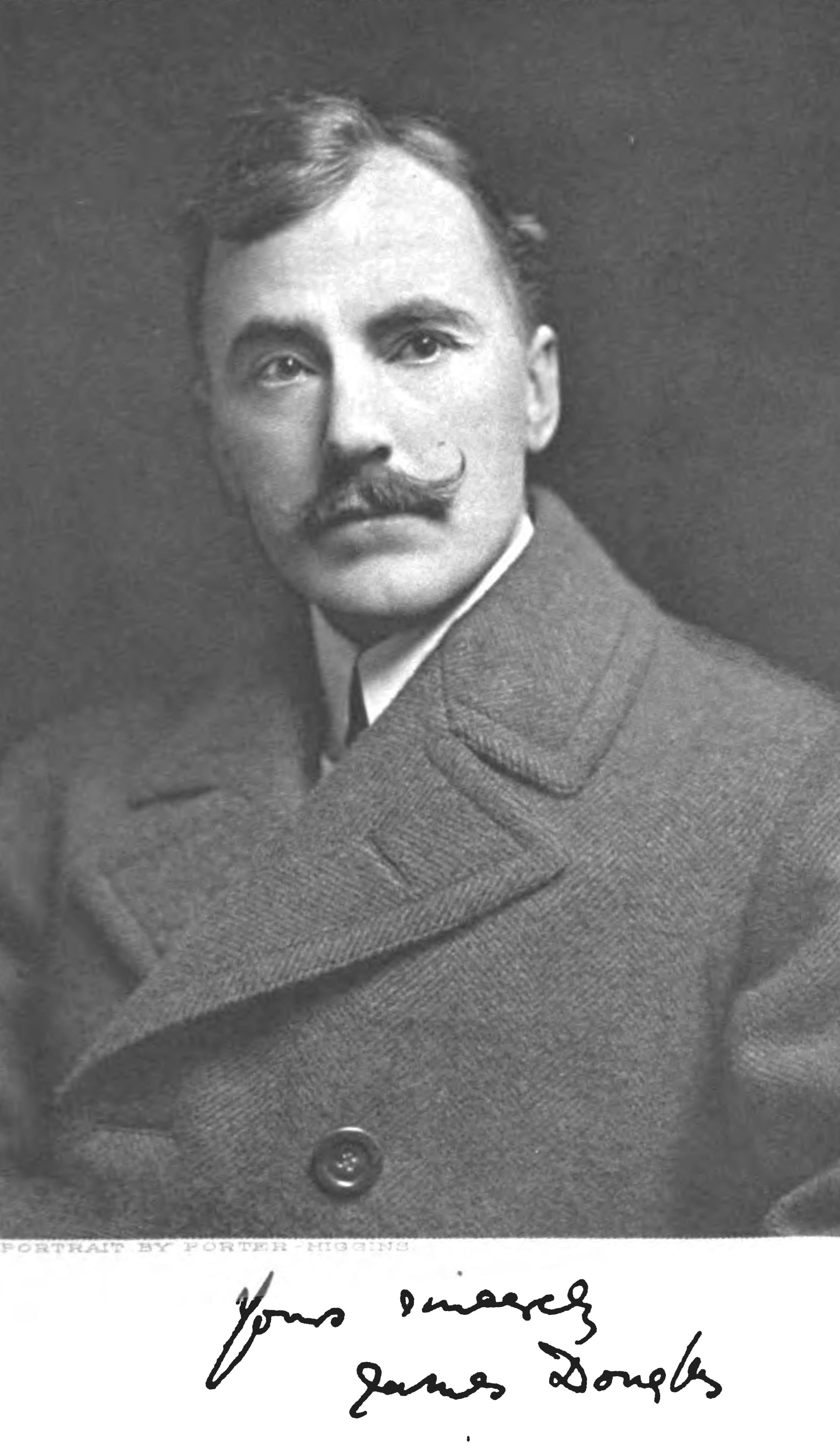
James Douglas ca. 1909

James Douglas (1867–1940) was a British critic, newspaper editor and author.

Douglas edited The Star from 1908 to 1920, then the Sunday Express until 1931. He was a supporter of censorship, and called for several books to be banned, most notably The Well of Loneliness. He was mocked by P. R. Stephensen and Jack Lindsay in The Sink of Solitude (1928).

Douglas made a negative review of John Worby's 1937 memoir, The Other Half, and urged banning it as a "dangerous book." The review boosted sales, and dust jackets on later editions included a quote by Douglas in both the UK and United States.

Media offices
Preceded by Ernest Parke	Editor of The Star; 1908–1920	Succeeded by Wilson Pope
Preceded by ?	Editor of the Sunday Express with John Gordon 1928–1931; 1920–1931	Succeeded by John Gordon
