= Robin Morgan (journalist) =

British journalist and newspaper editor

Robin Morgan is a British newspaper editor and journalist.

Morgan began his career in journalism at the Evening Echo in Hemel Hempstead, aged 16. In 1979, he joined the Sunday Times as a reporter. During the Wapping dispute of 1986–1987, he crossed the picket line and was the editor of the "Insight" investigative team. He led the newspaper's criticism of the "Death on the Rock" documentary, which investigated SAS actions which ended in the deaths of three Provisional IRA members.

In 1989, he became the editor of the Sunday Express, serving for two years, before a brief period editing City Limits (uncredited, as he thought publicising the post would damage his future employment prospects) then returning to edit the Sunday Times Magazine. From 1993 to 1994, Morgan was the editor of the UK edition of Reader's Digest. He then returned as editor of the Sunday Times Magazine, serving until 2009. He has also been a contributing editor of GQ.

In 2006, Morgan made his on-screen debut in Rabbit Fever.

Media offices
Preceded by Robin Esser	Editor of the Sunday Express; 1989–1991	Succeeded by Eve Pollard
