= Veronica Papworth =

British journalist and illustrator

Veronica Constance" Vee" Papworth (31 May 1913 – 21 September 1992), also known as Veronica Walley, was a British journalist and illustrator. She joined the London Evening Star in 1946 as a fashion illustrator and writer and moved to the women's pages of the Sunday Express in the 1950s where she stayed until the 1970s, both contributing a weekly column and illustrating her words.

She married surgeon George Jon Walley in 1950.
