= Rachel ter Horst =

Dutch glamour model (born 1973)

- Born: 20 March 1973 (age 53); Enschede, Netherlands
- Occupation: Glamour model

Rachel ter Horst (born 20 March 1973) is a Dutch glamour model.

Ter Horst began modeling when she was nineteen, posing regularly as a Page 3 girl for two of Great Britain's best-known tabloids, The Sun and the Daily Star. She was voted sexiest model of the century in the Dutch edition of Playboy magazine. She has appeared on six Dutch Playboy covers and been featured in at least fifteen Playboy Special Editions, as well as in Penthouse, Perfect 10, and other softcore pornographic magazines.

Ter Horst lent her vocals to the single "Return to Ibiza", released in August 2000 by the electronic duo Sabotage; and played a flight attendant in the accompanying music video.

She had an uncredited role as a girl in the casino in the James Bond movie GoldenEye (1995), and co-presented The Lads Guide to Rio.
