= Geoffrey Pinnington =

British newspaper editor

Geoffrey Pinnington (21 March 1919 – 24 December 1995) was a British newspaper editor.

Pinnington grew up in London, studying at Harrow County School for Boys and the University of London before joining the Royal Air Force in 1940, becoming a Squadron Leader by the end of the war. After the war, he became a reporter on the Middlesex Independent, then editor of the Kensington Post. He then joined the Daily Herald and became deputy editor in 1958, but when he temporarily took charge, he appeared to advocate unilateral disarmament, a policy opposed by the Trades Union Congress who then had a large stake in the paper. Feeling that his ambitions would not be fulfilled at the Herald, he moved to the Daily Mirror in 1961, working as first night editor, then assistant editor. In 1972, he became editor of The People.

Pinnington retired in 1982, joining the Press Council for four years.

Media offices
Preceded by ?	Deputy Editor of the Daily Herald; 1958–1961	Succeeded by Dick Dinsdale
Preceded by ?	Deputy Editor of the Sunday Mirror; 1968–1972	Succeeded by Michael Christiansen
Preceded by Bob Edwards	Editor of The People; 1972–1982	Succeeded by Nicholas Lloyd
