= The House on Falling Star Hill =

Book by Mike Molloy

The House on Falling Star Hill is a children's fantasy novel by Michael Molloy. It is intended for 9- to 12-year-olds, that is, the tween market.

== Plot summary ==
The novel's protagonist is Tim, a boy and his dog Josh who befriends a girl (Sarre) from another world. The two travel to a fantastic kingdom where an evil duke is plotting malevolence and where huge birds, used as transport, are menaced by disease spores. With the help of a group of roving merchants and minstrels, and a warrior, the children save the kingdom.
