= MaComère =

MaComère (ISSN 1521-9968) is a biannual peer-reviewed academic journal covering studies of and creative works by and about women in the Caribbean and its diaspora published by the Association of Caribbean Women Writers and Scholars (ACWWS). Past issues (1998–2009) are available online at the Digital Library of the Caribbean. The journal was established in 1998 and the editor-in-chief is Hyacinth Simpson (Ryerson University (now Toronto Metropolitan University)).

== Name ==
As described by Helen Pyne-Timothy, founding member of the ACWWS:

The word MaComère is widely used by women in the Caribbean to mean "my child's godmother"; "my best friend and close female confidante"; "my bridesmaid" or "another female member of a wedding party of which I was bridesmaid"; "the godmother of the child to whom I am also godmother"; "the woman who, by virtue of the depth of her friendship, has rights and privileges over my child and whom I see as surrogate mother."

This name seemed appropriate because it so clearly expresses the intimate relations which women in the Caribbean share, is so firmly gendered, and honors the importance of friendship in relation to the important rituals of marriage, birth and ... death.

Moreover, MaComère is a French Creole word which, though related to the French language, has taken on a structure and a meaning which is indigenous to the Caribbean. ... In the purely English-speaking islands, the only comparable term is godmother (usually the mother's best friend). In the Hispanophone Caribbean, there is the similar comadre, although, as we would expect, some of the connotations are different."
