= Mike Molloy =

British newspaper editor and author

- Born: Michael Molloy; 22 December 1940 (age 85)
- Occupations: Author; Newspaper editor (formerly)

Michael Molloy (born 22 December 1940) is a British author and former newspaper editor and cartoonist. He's also an accomplished painter, exhibiting in galleries across the UK and the South of France, and remains drawn to art as a deep creative passion.

== Biography ==
Born in Perivale, Molloy studied at Ealing Junior School and the Ealing School of Art before working at the Sunday Pictorial followed by the Daily Sketch, where he began drawing cartoons. In 1962, he joined the Daily Mirror, where he rose through the ranks until in 1975 he became editor.

In 1985, Robert Maxwell appointed Molloy Editor-in-Chief of the Daily Mirror, Sunday Mirror and The People, where he introduced colour printing. From 1986 to 1988, he additionally edited the Sunday Mirror.

From 1985 to 1995, Molloy wrote seven crime fiction books set in England, four featuring Sarah Keane and three featuring Lewis Home.

In 1990, Molloy left the Mirror Group, and in 1996 he bought Punch on behalf of Mohammed Al Fayed. He became its deputy editor, but left after six issues.

After retiring from the newspaper industry, he began writing children's fantasy novels.

In 2003, he was shortlisted for the Stockton Children's Book of the Year, while in 2007, he was shortlisted for the Hampshire Book Award.

Molloy married Sandy Foley in 1964 and they have three daughters, Jane (an interiors stylist), Kate (a journalist) and Alexandra (a writer).

== Published books ==
- The Century
- The Witch Trade
- The Wild West Witches
- The Time Witches
- The House on Falling Star Hill
- Peter Raven under Fire
- The Black Dwarf
- Cat's Paw
- Dogsbody
- Harlot of Jericho
- Home Before Dark
- The Kid from Riga
- Sweet Sixteen
- Experiencing the World's Religions

Media offices
Preceded by Michael Christiansen	Deputy Editor of the Daily Mirror; 1975	Succeeded by ?
Preceded by Michael Christiansen	Editor of the Daily Mirror; 1975–1985	Succeeded by Richard Stott
Preceded by Peter Thompson	Editor of the Sunday Mirror; 1986–1988	Succeeded by Eve Pollard
