= Christopher Ward (journalist) =

British writer, journalist, editor, and publisher

Christopher John Ward
- Born: 25 August 1942 (age 82)
- Education: King's College School, Wimbledon
- Occupation: Chairman of Redwood Publishing
- Employer(s): Redwood Publishing, the Daily Express, the Daily Mirror
- Awards: Mark Boxer Award (1995)
- Website: titanic-band.com/author.html

Christopher Ward is a British author, journalist, editor, and publisher. He is also the grandson and biographer of Jock Hume, a violinist who died in the sinking of the RMS Titanic and one of the members of the band which continued playing while the ship sank.

== Career ==
Ward began his career as a journalist in 1959 working at local newspapers, the Driffield Times and the Newcastle Evening Chronicle. He then moved to national daily, the Daily Mirror, in 1963 where he worked as a reporter, columnist and sub-editor before becoming assistant editor at the Mirror and its sister paper the Sunday Mirror in 1976. After five years in this position, Ward left the Mirror in 1981 to become editor at the Daily Express, a national daily newspaper, at age 38. He remained at the Express for two years, before leaving in 1983 to jointly found Redwood magazine publishers with Christopher Curry and Michael Potter.

Between 2002 and 2008, Ward was UK chairman of the World Wide Fund for Nature.

His book, And the Band Played On: The Titanic Violinist and the Glovemaker: A True Story of Love, Loss and Betrayal (2011), became a Sunday Times bestseller and was made into a documentary for the Discovery Channel titled, Titanic: The Aftermath. The book details the story of Ward's grandfather, Jock Hume, a violinist who died in the sinking of the RMS Titanic and one of the members of the band which continued playing while the ship sank.

== Books ==
- How to Complain (1974). London: Secker and Warburg. ISBN 9780436561627.
- Our Cheque is in the Post (1980). South Melbourne: Macmillan. ISBN 9780333337196.
- And The Band Played On: The Titanic Violinist and the Glovemaker: A True Story of Love, Loss and Betrayal (2011). London: Hodder and Stoughton. ISBN 9781444707977.

Media offices
Preceded by Arthur Firth	Editor of The Daily Express; 1981 - 1983	Succeeded by Larry Lamb
