= Sister paper =

Newspapers sharing a common owner

A sister paper is one of two or more newspapers which share a common owner, but are published with different content, different names, and sometimes (but not necessarily) in different geographical areas. Such an arrangement can offer economies of scale because staff and infrastructure can be shared.

Formerly independent papers can become sister papers, as when the Wall Street Journal and the New York Post were both purchased by News Corporation. Concerns have sometimes been raised about such media consolidation resulting in less diversity of ideas, less competition in the newspaper business, or unfair competition. Conversely, a single newspaper company can start several publications. By doing so, it can serve different markets, or different audiences in the same market, with less overhead than if the publications operated separately.
