= Arthur Christiansen =

British journalist and newspaper editor (1904–1963)

- Born: Arthur Robin Christiansen; 27 July 1904; Wallasey, Cheshire, England, UK
- Died: 27 September 1963 (aged 59); Norwich, Norfolk, England, UK
- Other name: Poodah (pet name in family)
- Occupations: Journalist, editor
- Spouse: Brenda Winifred
- Children: Michael Christiansen; Antoinette B Christiansen; Andrew N Christiansen; Greta J Christiansen

Arthur Robin Christiansen (27 July 1904 – 27 September 1963) was a British journalist, and editor of Lord Beaverbrook's newspaper the Daily Express from 1933 to 1957.

Christiansen was born in Wallasey, Cheshire to Louis Niels Christiansen, a shipwright, and his wife Ellen. From an early age, he demonstrated a talent for writing, producing a magazine for his grammar school. At 16, he became a reporter for the Wallasey and Wirral Chronicle, where he worked for three years before moving to the Liverpool Evening Express and the Liverpool Daily Courier. He was named the London editor of the Evening Express in 1925, a position he held for a year before moving to the Sunday Express.

Christiansen made his reputation four years later, when, as assistant editor, he produced a special late-morning edition of the Sunday Express to report the R101 airship disaster.

He was the subject of This Is Your Life in 1957, when he was surprised by Eamonn Andrews at the BBC Television Theatre.

In 1961, he was cast as the editor of the Daily Express in the Fleet Street-based sci-fi thriller The Day the Earth Caught Fire, directed by Val Guest. He also played a news editor in the 1963 medical thriller 80,000 Suspects, again directed by Guest.

Christiansen's son, Michael, also became a newspaper editor; his grandson Rupert Christiansen was the Daily Telegraph opera critic until 2020.

== Bibliography ==
- Headlines All My Life (1961)

== Partial filmography ==
- The Day the Earth Caught Fire (1961) – 'Jeff' Jefferson – Editor
- 80,000 Suspects (1963) – Editor – Bath Evening Chronicle (Mr. Graney) (final film role)

Media offices
Preceded by Beverley Baxter	Editor of The Daily Express; 1933–1957	Succeeded by Edward Pickering
