= Rosie Boycott, Baroness Boycott =

British journalist and editor (born 1951)

The Right Honourable The Baroness Boycott
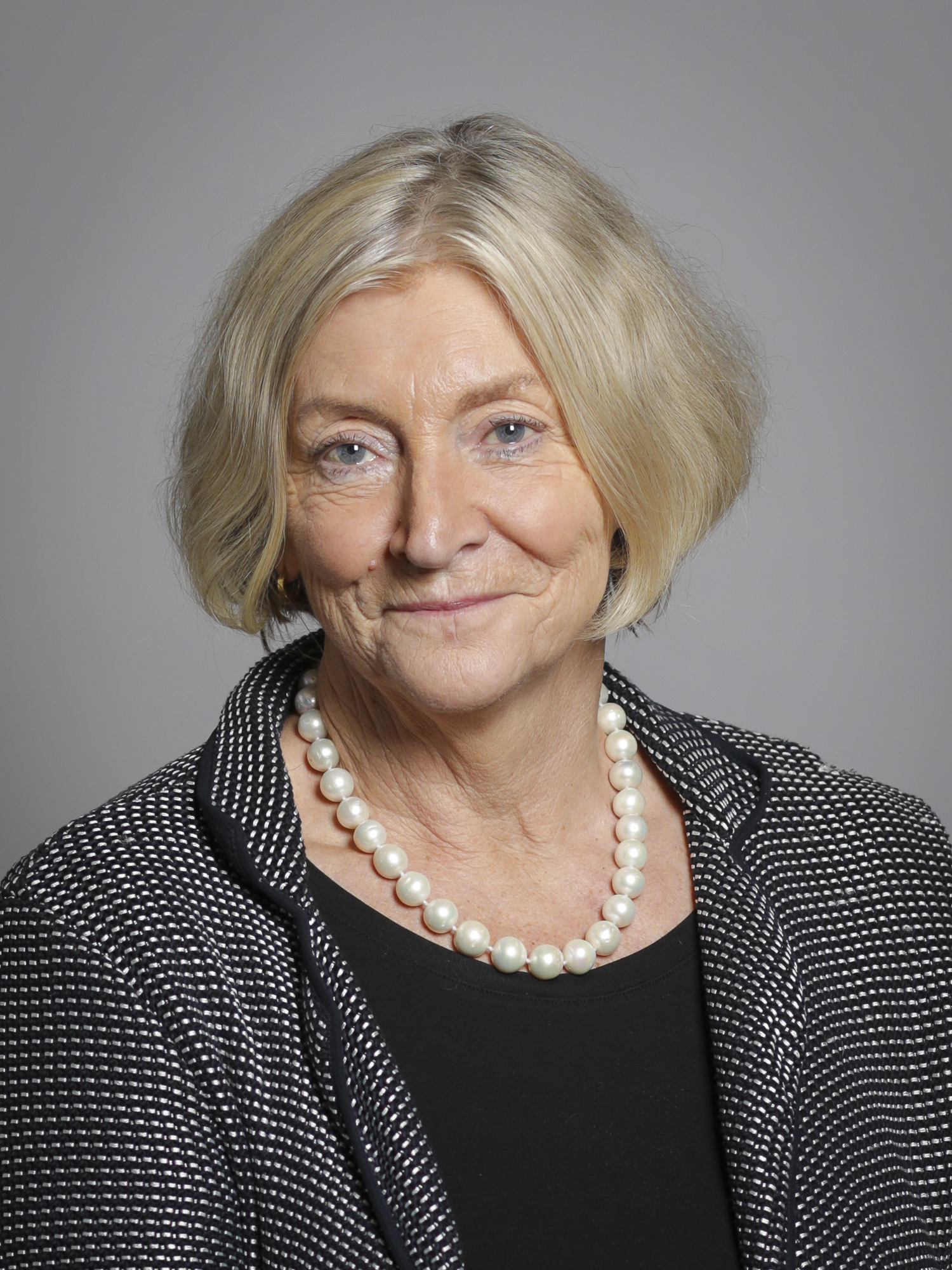

Member of the House of Lords
- Lord Temporal
- Life peerage 9 July 2018

Personal details
- Born: Rosel Marie Boycott; 13 May 1951 (age 75) Saint Helier, Jersey
- Party: Crossbench
- Spouse(s): David Leitch; Charles Howard
- Education: Cheltenham Ladies' College; University of Kent
- Occupation: Journalist, editor

Rosel Marie "Rosie" Boycott, Baroness Boycott (born 13 May 1951) is a British journalist and feminist. She was a co-founder of the feminist magazine Spare Rib and publisher Virago Press. She edited men's magazine Esquire and newspapers The Independent and Daily Express. She is also known for her books, appearances on Newsnight Review and participation in Celebrity MasterChef.

== Early life ==
The daughter of Major Charles Boycott and Betty Le Sueur Boycott, Rosel Marie "Rosie" Boycott was born on 13 May 1951 in Saint Helier, Jersey. She was privately educated at the independent Cheltenham Ladies' College and read mathematics at the University of Kent, but dropped out of the course to work in the underground press scene.

== Journalism career ==
Boycott worked for a year or so with Frendz radical magazine and in 1972, she co-founded the feminist monthly magazine Spare Rib with Marsha Rowe. The 20,000 print run of the first two issues sold out, helped by the publicity received from the refusal of W. H. Smith to stock it. Boycott and Rowe, however, had significant differences and the formation of a collective to run the magazine, at Rowe's suggestion, led to Boycott being marginalised, and she resigned not much more than a year later after the launch. Later, both women became directors of Virago Press, a publisher committed to women's writing, with Carmen Callil, who had founded the company in 1973.

From 1992 to 1996, Boycott was editor of the UK edition of the men's magazine Esquire, where she almost doubled its circulation. From 1996 to 1998, she headed The Independent and its sister publication the Independent on Sunday, becoming the first woman in history to edit a broadsheet newspaper.

Boycott edited the Daily Express from May 1998 to January 2001, leaving soon after the newspaper was bought by Richard Desmond, who replaced her with OK! magazine publisher Chris Williams.

In 2013, Boycott joined Charlotte Raven's campaign to relaunch Spare Rib as an online magazine, as it had ceased publication in 1993.

Boycott is currently the travel editor for The Oldie magazine and hosts The Oldie Travel Awards each year.

== Outside journalism ==
In 1973, Boycott was jailed in Thailand for 18 days for smuggling cannabis. In 1981 she checked herself into a clinic, writing about the experience in her autobiography A Nice Girl Like Me (1984). While working at The Independent, she started a campaign to legalise cannabis and was nicknamed "Rizla Rosie."

Boycott has presented the BBC Radio 4 programme A Good Read. She has sat on judging panels for literary awards, including chairing the panel responsible for choosing the 2001 Orange Prize for Fiction. She is also a media advisor for the Council of Europe. Boycott is a trustee of the Hay Festival in Wales and in Cartagena, Colombia.

In March 2002, she denounced the New Labour government as "more reminiscent of a dictatorship than a free healthy democratic system", and announced her support for the Liberal Democrats. She was rumoured to have considered becoming a Parliamentary candidate. She campaigned for Diana, Princess of Wales in the 2002 BBC programme to find the greatest Briton.

Boycott made several appearances on Newsnight Review and other cultural and current affairs programmes, where the fact that she is a recovering alcoholic was discussed. She started drinking heavily again after losing her job at the Express. She was banned from driving for three years in September 2003 after crashing on the A303 in Wiltshire, injuring another driver. She was cut free from the wreckage. A court was told she had also been caught drunk driving the day before. After her accident, Boycott has been running a farm in Somerset.

On 5 August 2008, Boycott was appointed as the chair of "London Food" as part of Conservative Mayor Boris Johnson's attempt to help improve Londoners' access to healthy, locally produced and affordable food.

In September 2007, she appeared in the third series of Hell's Kitchen, and was the first contestant to be voted off. In June 2009, she appeared on Celebrity MasterChef. The same month she was one of five volunteers who took part in a BBC series of three programmes entitled Famous, Rich and Homeless, about living penniless on the streets of London. Boycott has also appeared on The Weakest Link quiz show.

In June 2018, Boycott was nominated for a life peerage by the House of Lords Appointments Commission. She was created Baroness Boycott, of Whitefield in the County of Somerset, on 9 July.

In 2022, Boycott began a patron of The Vavengers women's and girls charity.

In January 2023, Boycott was awarded an honorary degree by Keele University "for contributions to journalism and social causes."

Boycott was a supporter of the Women's Equality Party.

== Personal life ==
Boycott is married to Charles Howard KC. Her first marriage was to journalist David Leitch (1937–2004).

== Publications ==
- Batty Bloomers and Boycott: A Little Etymology of Eponymous Words, New York: Peter Bedrick Books, 1983, ISBN 0-911745-12-2
- The Fastest Diet, London: Sphere Books, 1984. ISBN 0-7221-1960-7
- A Nice Girl Like Me: A Story of the Seventies, Pavanne Books, 1988, ISBN 0-330-30103-9
- All for Love, London: Fontana, 1989, ISBN 0-00-617698-4
- Our Farm: A Year in the Life of a Smallholding, London: Bloomsbury, 2007, ISBN 0-7475-8897-X

Media offices
Preceded by Charles Wilson	Editor of The Independent on Sunday; 1996 – May 1998	Succeeded by Kim Fletcher
Preceded by Andrew Marr	Editor of The Independent; January 1998 – March 1998	Succeeded by Rosie Boycott and Andrew Marr
Preceded by Rosie Boycott	Editor of The Independent (jointly with Andrew Marr); March 1998 – May 1998	Succeeded by Simon Kelner
Preceded by Richard Addis	Editor of the Daily Express; 1998 – 2001	Succeeded by Chris Williams
