= Derek Marks =

Derek John Marks (15 January 1921 – 8 February 1975) was Editor of the Daily Express between 1965 and 1971. He was educated at Seaford College.

Media offices
Preceded by Bob Edwards	Editor of The Daily Express; 1965 - 1971	Succeeded by Alastair Burnet
