= Edward Pickering (journalist) =

British newspaper editor (1912–2003)

Sir Edward Davies Pickering (4 May 1912 – 8 August 2003) was a British newspaper editor.

Pickering was born in Middlesbrough, the son of a master pawnbroker. He attended Middlesbrough High School and then entered journalism as an apprentice with the Northern Echo. He then moved to London as a sub-editor on the Daily Mirror, followed by the Daily Mail. During World War II, he joined the Royal Artillery, rising to become a major by the end of the conflict, and working closely with Dwight D. Eisenhower.

In 1947, Pickering became managing editor of the Daily Mail. When he failed to win the editor's job, in 1950, he resigned and instead became deputy editor of the Daily Express. At the Express he mentored Rupert Murdoch. In 1957, he became editor of the paper. Without making any major changes, he was able to increase sales by 200,000 copies per day, but owner Lord Beaverbrook disliked his laid-back approach to the job, and sacked him in 1962. As a consolation, Beaverbrook appointed Pickering as editor of the Farming Express, but this was not a position Pickering desired, and he left in 1964 to become editorial director of the Mirror group. He retired in 1977 and was knighted in that year, but in 1981 he became executive vice-chairman of News International.

Media offices
Preceded by Arthur Christiansen	Editor of the Daily Express; 1957–1962	Succeeded by Bob Edwards
