= Murdoch MacLennan =

British senior media executive (born 1949)

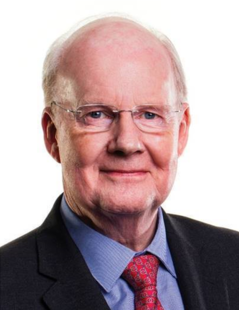
- Murdoch MacLennan
- Born: April 1949 (age 77)
- Occupation: media executive

Murdoch MacLennan (born 10 April 1949) is a British senior media executive. He is chairman of the Press Association Group, Independent News & Media, and also of the Scottish Professional Football League.

From 2004 until 2017 he was CEO of the Telegraph Media Group after which he served as Deputy Chairman until March 2018, and remains a Non-Executive Director.

Previously he was the group managing director of Associated Newspapers from 1994 to 2004. He has held a number of roles for publishing groups within the British newspaper industry and in international bodies.

== Early life and career ==
MacLennan was born on 10 April 1949 in Glasgow, Scotland, to Donald MacLennan (1919-1991) and Hazel MacLennan (née Hope, 1923).

MacLennan began his career as a graduate trainee at The Scotsman in Edinburgh, then worked for titles in Newcastle and South Wales before moving to Reading as production manager for a regional evening paper. He joined the board of the Daily Record and Sunday Mail as production director in 1982. Both papers were part of Mirror Group Newspapers, and he then became the group's director of production in 1984. He moved to Express Newspapers a year later in 1985 to become production and technical director. In 1989, he joined Associated Newspapers as managing director of Harmsworth Quays. In 1992, he returned to Mirror Group as group operations director of Mirror Group Newspapers and managing director of the Daily Record and Sunday Mail remaining until 1994, when he returned to Associated Newspapers.

While working at the Daily Mail MacLennan was given the nickname MacGifty on account of his giving of gifts to colleagues. This generosity seemed to be derived "from a desire to be liked, and an old-fashioned Fleet Street belief in munificence". MacLennan had a reputation for sacking employees. After one occasion the victim's mother asked the reasons behind his decision and MacLennan answered, "What should I do? Shall I resign? Would that make it better?" A former colleague is quoted as saying "He wants to be your best friend, then he sacks you".

== Telegraph group and industry roles ==
In August 2004, he was appointed as the CEO of the Telegraph Media Group. He stepped down from the role in June 2017, becoming deputy chairman of the group. He stepped down from this role in March 2018, but remains a non-executive member of the board of directors.

In 2010, he became Non-Executive Chairman of the Press Association Group, a multi-platform content provider, in addition to his role at the Telegraph Media Group. He was President of IFRA in Darmstadt (the global technical association for newspapers) from 1997 to 2003 became a vice president of the World Association of Newspapers (2003–2010). He is a member of the European Publishers' Council (EPC) and a director of the International News Media Association (INMA).

MacLennan has twice been chairman of the Newspaper Publishers Association (2005-2007; 2013-2014). He is a member of the Regulatory Funding Company Board and in 2015 he joined the Google DNI Council.

In 2010 MacLennan was ranked as number 17 on the annual MediaGuardian 100 list of most powerful people in the UK. MacLennan was accused of covering up any negative stories about the banking giant HSBC within the Daily Telegraph newspaper. Peter Oborne, former chief political correspondent at the Telegraph, quit the paper stating that MacLennan in particular was "determined" not to allow negative stories about HSBC to appear. Oborne claimed this was a "form of fraud" as HSBC were a lucrative advertising customer

In 2010 MacLennan faced criticism for attending an undisclosed thank you dinner for major donors to the Conservative party which was hosted by then prime minister David Cameron . MacLennan attended the dinner at Downing Street along with Lord John Sainsbury, the Tory peer and part-owner of supermarket giant Sainsbury's, Andrew Feldman, co-chairman of the Tory party, and five other couples described as major donors to the party.

== Other roles ==
MacLennan was a member of the Commission on Scottish Devolution (The Calman Commission). He was appointed an Honorary Professor attached to the Business School at Glasgow University in 1997 and has been the Chancellor's Assessor on the Court of Glasgow University since 2009. MacLennan has initiated and led media sponsorships, such as the chair in Environmental Newspaper Technologies at the University of Paisley and has been involved in developing other media related campaigns, such as the 'Newspapers in Education' initiative in Scotland which led to a major project on 'The Year 2000’ being undertaken by every school in the country.

MacLennan is involved in several charities, including the Journalists' Charity, and was President of the Printing Charity from 2012 to 2013.

He holds other directorships, including Vice-President and Appeals Chairman of the Newspaper Press Fund and Festival chairman of Newstraid. He is a Companion of the Institute of Management and a Freeman of the City of London.

MacLennan was appointed chairman of the Scottish Professional Football League (SPFL) in July 2017. There was criticism that MacLennan is not impartial in his role with the SPFL considering the fact that INM's majority shareholder is Celtic's majority shareholder Dermot Desmond. One of Desmond close associates and fellow Celtic fan Denis O'Brian is also an INM shareholder. MacLennan has shown his hatred and loathing of Rangers FC, having been quoted as saying "Ah cannae stand the bastards". He also held an executive box at the home of Celtic football club. The SPFL refused to investigate the connection and possible conflict of interest between MacLennan, Celtic and the SPFL.

MacLennan faced criticism in 2020 after he claimed that no club had received a loan from the SPFL since 2013. This statement was contradicted by the fact that both Motherwell and Partick Thistle had received payouts totaling £300,000 from the SPFL to keep both clubs solvent in 2017. The figure was signed off by both MacLennan and SPFL chief executive Neil Doncaster.

MacLennan and the SPFL was forced to apologise and issue compensation to one of its member clubs Rangers after they were found to have breached a sponsorship agreement that Rangers had with Parks motor group when the SPFL signed a new sponsorship deal with the car sales firm cinch. The cinch deal was also controversial, in that SPFL chief executive Neil Doncaster spent significant sums of money on consultancy fees. As part of the process MacLennan and the SPFL board faced criticism for underselling the league through sponsorship and TV deals.

Further controversy followed his chairmanship. After an independent review was carried out on the governance of the league. MacLennan released a statement praising the report and stating that he was "reassured, but not complacent" with the findings of the report. Many member clubs challenged and criticised Murdoch and his management, for the release of the statement and for the reports "factual inaccuracies" claiming that the SPFL executive (MacLennan) made amendments to the report before it was shared with the board or the clubs which contradicts the Independence of the review.

In March 2018, he was appointed as chairman of Independent News & Media (INM). He also received an Honorary Doctorate at the University of Paisley.
