= Dean Dunham =

British lawyer and media personality

Dean Peter Dunham KC (Hon) is a solicitor-advocate, barrister and arbitrator, who has served as the Chief Ombudsman at The Retail Ombudsman, a former Alternative Dispute Resolution provider in the UK.

He is considered to be one of the leading authorities on consumer law, being named in the Thomson Reuters Superlawyers List and Legal 500 and has been named as Consumer Lawyer of the Year every year between 2018 and 2025, and Solicitor Advocate of the Year 2018.

Dunham, who is often referred to as a "celebrity lawyer", is also one of the leading commentators on consumer law in the media, providing regular commentary on BBC One, ITV, Channel 4 and Channel 5. He has also written legal advice columns in the Daily Mirror and Sun newspapers.

In 2026 His Majesty the King approved Dunham to be awarded Honorary King’s Counsel (KC Honoris Causa), for the significant, positive impact he has made on the shape of the law of England and Wales, outside the courtroom.

Dunham is the presenter of the LBC Consumer Hour

Dunham is currently the consumer law columnist for the Mirror Group the Sunday People and Daily Express newspapers .

== Education ==
Dunham studied law at the University of Buckingham, a private university, graduating in 1997.

He completed the Legal Practice Course and Professional Skills Course at the College of Law and then qualified as a Solicitor-Advocate. Dunham is also a non-practising barrister (called to Middle Temple) and is a qualified arbitrator (MCIArb).

== High profile cases ==
Dunham represented Freddie Starr in his unsuccessful libel case against Karin Ward, and the original Bucks Fizz in the unsuccessful Bucks Fizz legal dispute during 2011.
