= Guy Black, Baron Black of Brentwood =

British peer (born 1964)

The Right Honourable The Lord Black of Brentwood FRSA
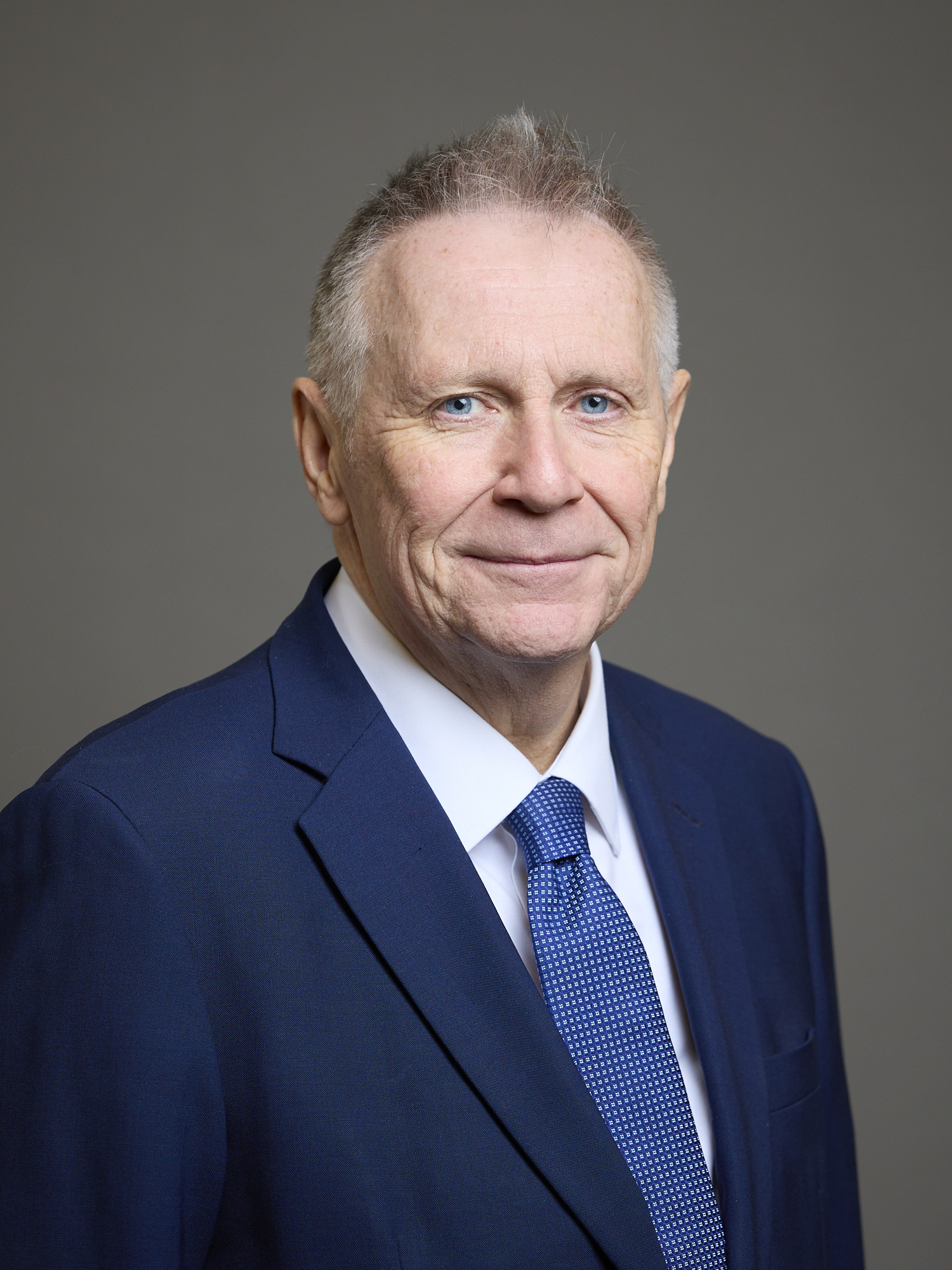
- Official portrait, 2024

Member of the House of Lords
- Lord Temporal
- Life peerage 9 July 2010

Personal details
- Born: Guy Vaughan Black; 6 August 1964 (age 62) Brentwood, Essex, England
- Party: Conservative
- Spouse: Mark Bolland (m. 2015)
- Education: Peterhouse, Cambridge (BA)

Guy Vaughan Black, Baron Black of Brentwood FRSA (born 6 August 1964) is Deputy Chairman of the Telegraph Media Group. He is a Conservative life peer member of the House of Lords.

His career has spanned politics and the media. In the Media Guardian Top 100 listings in September 2012, he was ranked 55. He is a member of the Association of Conservative Peers. From 2005 to 2018, he was Deputy Chairman of the Telegraph Media Group.

Black was director of the political section at the Conservative Research Department from 1986 to 1989 when David Cameron was his deputy.

== Education ==
One of twins, Black was educated at Brentwood School, Essex and then Peterhouse, Cambridge, where he held the John Cosin scholarship and won the Sir Herbert Butterfield Prize for history. He graduated from there with double first class honours in history in 1985.

== Conservative Party career ==
After working for a year at Barclays de Zoete Wedd, Black joined the Conservative Research Department in 1986. He was a member of the Brentwood and Ongar Conservative Association from 1982 to 1992.

He left CRD in 1989 to become Special Adviser to the Secretary of State for Energy, John Wakeham, who was then spearheading the privatisation of the electricity industry.

He also served as a councillor for the Shenfield ward on the Brentwood District Council from 1988 to 1992. After the 1992 election, Black spent four years in public affairs, working for Westminster Strategy (1992–94) and then Lowe Bell Good Relations (1994–96).

=== Conservative Party Director of Communications ===
In December 2003, Black became Director of Communications for the Conservative Party, and Press Secretary to party leader Michael Howard, the Leader of the Opposition.

=== Conservatives in Communications ===
According to PR Week, Black played a role in establishing Conservatives in Communications, although this group is now dormant. The group is made up of Conservative Party-supporting public relations executives, professionals and lobbyists and aims to provide unofficial communications advice to the Conservative Party.

== Public appointments and charitable roles ==
Black was a member of the Imperial War Museum board from 2007 to 2015. In 2010, he became a member of The Guild of St Bride's, Fleet Street. He was a Trustee of the Sir Edward Heath Charitable Foundation until he resigned in January 2009.

In August 2017, Black became Chairman of the Royal College of Music, having been a member of Council since 2009.

He has been a Governor of Brentwood School since 2013.

He is the Patron of the international NGO The Rory Peck Trust, Patron of International Cat Care, Patron of Terrence Higgins Trust and President Emeritus of The Printing Charity. In summer 2026, Black joined the trustee board for Terrence Higgins Trust as chair.

== Media career ==
Black returned to the media after the 2005 general election, joining the Telegraph Media Group in September that year.

In September 2009, he became Chairman of the Press Standards Board of Finance (PressBof), the body responsible for funding the PCC and overseeing the industry's system of self-regulation. He also sits on the Advertising Standards Board of Finance (ASBOF), which performs a similar role in funding the Advertising Standards Authority (ASA).

Black is Chairman of the Commonwealth Press Union Media Trust, which seeks to preserve and enhance media freedom throughout the Commonwealth.

In 2016, Black was awarded Honorary Fellowship of the Chartered Institute of Public Relations and was a winner of the Journalists' Charity Award at the British Press Awards in 2017 for an "outstanding contribution to journalists and journalism".

=== Press Complaints Commission ===
In 1996, Black returned to work for Lord Wakeham as Director of the Press Complaints Commission (PCC). During his time there he was responsible for the tightening of the Code of Practice in the wake of the death in 1997 of Diana, Princess of Wales, and for putting in place the arrangements to protect the privacy of Princes William and Harry. During the passage of the Human Rights Act 1998, he successfully campaigned to have special protection established in the legislation to protect freedom of expression.

== House of Lords ==
Black was elected a Fellow of the Royal Society of Arts in 1997. He was created a Life Peer on 9 July 2010 taking the title Baron Black of Brentwood, of Brentwood in the County of Essex, and he was introduced into the Lords on 13 July 2010 by Lords Wakeham and Marland, and made his maiden speech on 21 July on the role of older women in civic society and the particular problems of osteoporosis.

In a speech in the House of Lords on 25 November 2010 he attacked the use of "conditional fee" arrangements in cases involving privacy and libel. He said, "There is currently no more serious threat to media freedom and to the public’s right to know than the unfettered use by claimant lawyers of CFAs backed by the toxic combination of 100% success fees and 'after the event insurance.''

He is a Vice-President of the Debating Group and a member of Albany Associates International Ltd's advisory board.

From 2011 to 2012 Black was a member of the Joint Committee on Privacy and Injunctions, and a member of the Select Committee on Sexual Violence in conflict between 2015 and 2016.

He also won Pink News Peer of the Year Award for his contribution to LGBT issues in Parliament in 2016.

Black played a leading role on the question of Equal Marriage.

== Leveson inquiry ==
As Chairman of PressBof until it was dissolved in 2016, Black has played a key part in the Leveson Inquiry hearings, including presenting proposals from the newspaper industry for a new system of independent self-regulation.

Black has said the newspaper industry would fully implement the principles of the Leveson Report. He said: "if the industry can make rapid progress in the task of establishing a new system, such [legislation] would not be just be profoundly dangerous but completely unnecessary."

== Personal life ==
On 11 February 2006, he entered a civil partnership ceremony with his long-term partner Mark Bolland and this was converted into marriage on 22 June 2015. Many leading media and political figures attended the ceremony and Murdoch MacLennan and Rebekah Brooks were witnesses. Black is the first openly gay Conservative peer.

== Arms ==
Coat of arms of Guy Black, Baron Black of Brentwood

Crest
A demi-lion the tail nowed Or and entwining an annulet Vert the dexter claws supporting a distaff also Vert.
Escutcheon
Vert an opinicus rampant sans ears and with a bull's tail on a chief Argent three choughs Gules.
Supporters
On either side a bear Or holding with the exterior forefoot by a line a church bell Argent and resting the interior hindfoot upon a pierced mullet Gules.
Motto
Tranquilli Tenaces

Orders of precedence in the United Kingdom
Preceded by The Lord Touhig	Gentlemen; Baron Black of Brentwood	Followed by The Lord Wills
