= Adam Helliker =

English journalist and columnist

Adam Helliker is an English journalist and columnist who is now a Communications & Media consultant.

== Biography ==
Adam Helliker worked for the Daily Mail as a feature writer and diarist from 1981 until 1997 when he went to the Sunday Telegraph, where he edited the Mandrake column and wrote features for four years. He moved to the Mail on Sunday to create a new column, which he wrote for two years before joining the Sunday Express where he wrote the Adam Helliker column. and edited the paper's political column, Crossbencher, for ten years. He also wrote features for the Sunday Express Magazine and articles for the Daily Express. He is the author of The Debrett Season and is a contributor to British and American magazines and was a correspondent for NBC TV. After leaving Express Newspapers in 2019, following the group's takeover by Reach Plc, he continued to write for various newspapers and magazines, and diversified into public relations and communications advice, particularly for Civil Service departments. He wrote a history of the National Security Council for Civil Service Quarterly. He now works for the Policy & Communications Directorate at the National Cyber Security Centre, part of GCHQ, and has worked for the National Security Communications unit at the Cabinet Office.
