= Telegraph Media Group =

British newspaper company

Telegraph Media Group Limited
- Trade name: TMG
- Type: Subsidiary
- Industry: Mass media
- Founded: 1948; 78 years ago
- Headquarters: London, England, UK
- Products: Newspapers and websites
- Revenue: £196 million (2024)
- Operating income: £23.8 million (2024)
- Total assets: £509 million (2024)
- Parent: Axel Springer SE
- Subsidiaries: The Daily Telegraph; The Sunday Telegraph
- Website: corporate.telegraph.co.uk

Telegraph Media Group Limited (TMG; previously the Telegraph Group) is a multimedia news company that publishes daily and weekly publications in printed and electronic formats and owns The Daily Telegraph, The Sunday Telegraph and The Chelsea Magazine Company. These publications cover politics, obituaries, sports, finance, lifestyle, travel, health, culture, technology, fashion, and automobiles. Beginning in 2023, the group had been seeking new ownership, with Axel Springer SE announcing they had agreed to acquire the group, in March 2026.

The group and its publications have historically aligned with the Conservative Party and TMG are considered to be right-leaning. The audience of The Telegraph according to YouGov skews male and to older age groups, is affluent and its readers are more likely to vote for the Conservative Party, in comparison to averages across other UK newspaper brands.

== History ==
The Berry family were involved in the ownership of the groups companies since 1928. When the group ran into difficulties in 1985, Lord Hartwell sold the business to Conrad Black. It was widely reported that the Berry family attempted to regain control of the group in 2004, via a consortium that included Daily Mail, General Trust and private equity firm Cinven, however later reports suggested that the family were not involved in the unsuccessful bid.

David and Frederick Barclay acquired the group on 30 July 2004 from Hollinger Inc. of Toronto, Canada, the newspaper group controlled by Conrad Black, after months of bidding and lawsuits. The ownership structure of the group under the control of the Barclay brothers was complex, with them being owned by a company based in Jersey, which was owned by Bermuda-based B.UK, a subsidiary of Penultimate Investments Holdings, based in the British Virgin Islands.

In 2015, TMG's operating profit was £51 million. According to unaudited accounts, profits before tax were £47 million, and turnover for the 53 weeks up to 3 January 2016 was £319 million. These figures indicated an increase from 2014 levels.

Nick Hugh joined TMG as Chief Executive Officer in 2016, from Yahoo. The group pursued a "reader first" strategy, seeking to increase subscriptions and maintain a focus on editorial aspects, whilst outsourcing production and advertising. By 2022, the groups revenue was £254 million, with annual profits of £40 million.

In 2023, TMG acquired The Chelsea Magazine Company, publisher of magazines including The English Home, Artists and Illustrators and Classic Boat. In the same year, the company reached a milestone having achieved over 1 million subscribers.

In June 2023, the group was put up for sale after B.UK entered receivership. The Barclay family had amassed debts of £1 billion and Lloyds Banking Group effectively repossessed TMG. Howard and Aidan Barclay were removed as directors. The debt owed to Lloyds Banking Group was subsequently settled. The group made a loss of £244 million in 2023, despite an otherwise good financial performance, due to loans paid to the Barclay family. By year ending 2024, revenue was £196 million, with a profit of £23.8 million.

Investment firm RedBird Capital Partners announced plans to purchase the publisher for £500 million in May 2025, but the deal collapsed in November 2025. Senior editorial staff at The Telegraph had voiced concerns about the acquisition, as had the UK government in terms of foreign state ownership of media in the UK.

Daily Mail and General Trust agreed to buy TMG for £500 million in November 2025. The Competition and Markets Authority subsequently launched an inquiry into the acquisition, due to competition and public interest concerns. Shortly after the probe was initiated, in March 2026, it was announced that Axel Springer had agreed to purchase TMG, increasing the amount offered by Daily Mail and General Trust by £75 million, to £575 million. Axel Springer had previously shown an interest in purchasing the group in 2004.
