= Niall Ferguson bibliography =

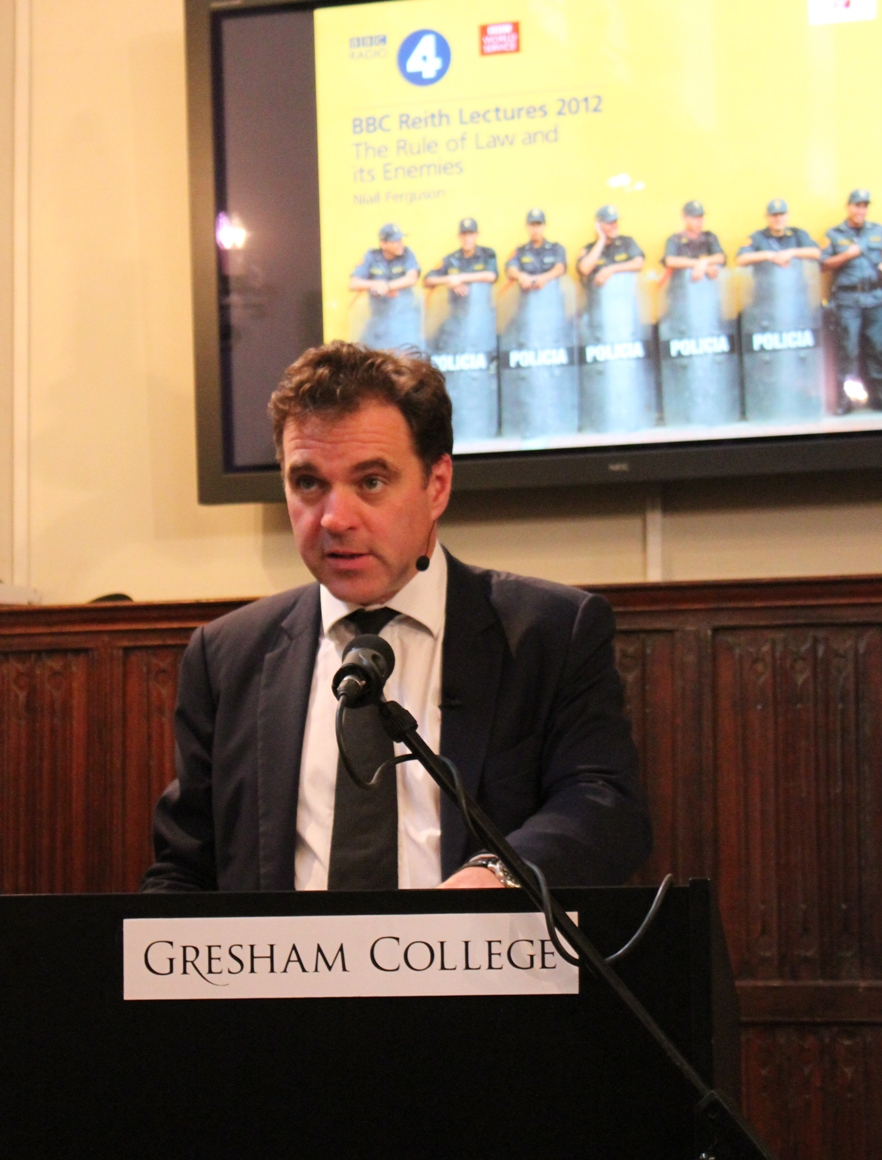
- Niall Ferguson recording the BBC Reith Lecture at Gresham College

The bibliography of Niall Ferguson, a Scottish historian based in the United States who is the Milbank Family Senior Fellow at the Hoover Institution at Stanford University and a Senior Faculty Fellow at the Belfer Center for Science and International Affairs at Harvard University. Previously, he was a professor at Harvard, the London School of Economics and New York University, a visiting professor at the UK New College of the Humanities, and a senior research fellow at Jesus College, Oxford, England.

Ferguson writes and lectures on international history, economic and financial history and British and American imperialism.

He has written more than a dozen books.

== Books ==
- Ferguson, Niall (1995). Paper and iron : Hamburg business and German politics in the era of inflation, 1897–1927. Cambridge: Cambridge University Press.
- — (1999). The House of Rothschild: The World's Banker, 1849–1999. New York, N.Y.: Viking Press. ISBN 0-670-88794-3.
  - — (1998). The World's Banker: The History of the House of Rothschild. London: Weidenfeld & Nicolson. ISBN 0-297-81539-3.
  - — (1998). The House of Rothschild. New York: Viking. ISBN 0-670-85768-8.
- — (1999) [1998]. The Pity of War. New York: Basic Books. ISBN 0-465-05711-X. OCLC 41124439.
- — (1999) [1997]. Virtual History: Alternatives and Counterfactuals. New York: Basic Books. ISBN 0-465-02322-3.
- — (2001). The Cash Nexus: Money and Power in the Modern World, 1700–2000. London: Allen Lane. ISBN 0-7139-9465-7. OCLC 46459770.
- — (2003). Empire: How Britain Made the Modern World. London: Allen Lane. ISBN 0-7139-9615-3.
  - — (2003). Empire: The Rise and Demise of the British World Order and the Lessons for Global Power. New York: Basic Books. ISBN 0-465-02328-2. American edition.
- — (2004). Colossus: The Rise and Fall of the American Empire. Gardners Books. ISBN 0-7139-9770-2.
- — (2005). 1914. Pocket Penguins 70s S. London, England: Penguin Books Ltd. ISBN 0-14-102220-5.
- — (2006). The War of the World: History's Age of Hatred. London: Allen Lane. ISBN 0-7139-9708-7. American ed. has the title: The war of the World: Twentieth-century Conflict and the Descent of the West OCLC 70839824 (also a Channel 4 series)
- — (2008). The Ascent of Money: A Financial History of the World. London: Allen Lane. ISBN 978-1-84614-106-5.
- — (2010). High Financier: The Lives and Times of Siegmund Warburg. New York: Penguin. ISBN 978-1-59420-246-9.
- — (2011). Civilization: The West and the Rest. The Penguin Press HC. ISBN 978-1-59420-305-3.
- — (2013). The Great Degeneration. Penguin Books.
- — (2015). Kissinger: 1923–1968: The Idealist. New York: Penguin Press. ISBN 978-1-59420-653-5.
- — (2017). The Square and the Tower: Networks, Hierarchies and the Struggle for Global Power. London: Allen Lane. ISBN 978-024129-046-0.
- — (2021). Doom: The Politics of Catastrophe. London: Allen Lane. ISBN 9780241488447.

== Articles ==
- "Let Germany Keep Its Nerve", The Spectator, 22 April 1995, pages 21–23
- "Europa nervosa", in Nader Mousavizadeh (ed.), The Black Book of Bosnia (New Republic/Basic Books, 1996), pp. 127–32
- "The German inter-war economy: Political choice versus economic determinism" in Mary Fulbrook (ed.), German History since 1800 (Arnold, 1997), pp. 258–278
- "The balance of payments question: Versailles and after" in Manfred F. Boemeke, Gerald D. Feldman and Elisabeth Glaser (eds.), The Treaty of Versailles: A Reassessment after 75 Years (Cambridge University Press, 1998), pp. 401–440
- "'The Caucasian Royal Family': The Rothschilds in national contexts" in R. Liedtke (ed.), 'Two Nations': The Historical Experience of British and German Jews in Comparison (J.C.B. Mohr, 1999)
- "Academics and the Press", in Stephen Glover (ed.), Secrets of the Press: Journalists on Journalism (Penguin, 1999), pp. 206–220
- "Metternich and the Rothschilds: A reappraisal" in Andrea Hamel and Edward Timms (eds.), Progress and Emancipation in the Age of Metternich: Jews and Modernisation in Austria and Germany, 1815–1848 (Edwin Mellen Press, 1999), pp. 295–325
- "The European economy, 1815–1914" in T.C.W. Blanning (ed.), The Short Oxford History of Europe: The Nineteenth Century (Oxford University Press, 2000), pp. 78–125
- "How (not) to pay for the war: Traditional finance and total war" in Roger Chickering and Stig Förster (eds.), Great War, Total War: Combat and Mobilization on the Western Front (Cambridge University Press, 2000), pp. 409–34
- "Introduction" in Frederic Manning, Middle Parts of Fortune (Penguin, 2000), pp. vii–xviii
- "Clashing civilizations or mad mullahs: The United States between informal and formal empire" in Strobe Talbott (ed.), The Age of Terror (Basic Books, 2001), pp. 113–41
- "Public debt as a post-war problem: The German experience after 1918 in comparative perspective" in Mark Roseman (ed.), Three Post-War Eras in Comparison: Western Europe 1918-1945-1989 (Palgrave-Macmillan, 2002), pp. 99–119
- "Das Haus Sachsen-Coburg und die europäische Politik des 19. Jahrhunderts", in Rainer von Hessen (ed.), Victoria Kaiserin Friedrich (1840–1901): Mission und Schicksal einer englischen Prinzessin in Deutschland (Campus Verlag, 2002), pp. 27–39
- "Max Warburg and German politics: The limits of financial power in Wilhelmine Germany", in Geoff Eley and James Retallack (eds.), Wilhelminism and Its Legacies: German Modernities, Imperialism and the Meaning of Reform, 1890–1930 (Berghahn Books, 2003), pp. 185–201
- "Introduction", The Death of the Past by J. H. Plumb (Palgrave Macmillan, 2003), pp. xxi–xlii
- "Globalization in historical perspective: The political dimension", in Michael D. Bordo, Alan M. Taylor and Jeffrey G. Williamson (eds.), Globalisation in Historical Perspective (National Bureau of Economic Research Conference Report) (University of Chicago Press, 2003)
- "Introduction to Tzvetan Todorov" in Nicholas Owen (ed.), Human Rights, Human Wrongs: Oxford Amnesty Lectures (Amnesty International, 2003)
- "The City of London and British imperialism: New light on an old question", in Youssef Cassis and Eric Bussière (eds.), London and Paris as International Financial Centres in the Twentieth Century (Oxford University Press, 2004), pp. 57–77
- "A bolt from the blue? The City of London and the outbreak of the First World War", in Wm. Roger Louis (ed.), Yet More Adventures with Britainnia: Personalities, Politics and Culture in Britain (I.B. Tauris, 2005), pp. 133–145
- "The first 'Eurobonds': The Rothschilds and the financing of the Holy Alliance, 1818–1822", in William N. Goetzmann and K. Geert Rouwenhorst (eds.), The Origins of Value: The Financial Innovations that Created Modern Capital Markets (Oxford University Press, 2005), pp. 311–323
- "Prisoner taking and prisoner killing in the age of total war", in George Kassemiris (ed.), The Barbarization of Warfare (New York University Press, 2006), pp. 126–158
- "The Second World War as an economic disaster", in Michael Oliver (ed.), Economic Disasters of the Twentieth Century (Edward Elgar, 2007), pp. 83–132
- "The Problem of Conjecture: American Strategy after the Bush Doctrine", in Melvyn Leffler and Jeff Legro (eds.), To Lead the World: American Strategy After the Bush Doctrine (Oxford University Press, 2008)

== Working papers ==
- "Ferguson's Law: Debt Service, Military Spending, and the Fiscal Limits of Power" (Working paper). Hoover History Lab, Applied History Working Group. Hoover Institution. 2025-02-21. "…proposes Ferguson's Law, which states that any great power that spends more on debt servicing than on defense risks ceasing to be a great power. … the United States began violating Ferguson's Law for the first time in nearly a century in 2024."
