= Escape Dangerous =

1947 British film by Digby Smith

- Opening titles
- Directed by: Digby Smith
- Written by: Oswell Blakeston
- Produced by: John Denny; Beresford Egan; Digby Smith
- Starring: Beresford Egan; Marianne Stone
- Cinematography: Stanley Clinton
- Edited by: Joseph Levine
- Music by: Joseph Levine
- Production company: DS Films
- Distributed by: H & S Film Services
- Release date: December 1947
- Running time: 62 minutes
- Country: United Kingdom
- Language: English

Escape Dangerous is a 1947 British second feature ('B') drama film directed by Digby Smith and starring Beresford Egan and Marianne Stone. It was written by Oswell Blakeston (pseudonym of Henry Joseph Hasslacher).

== Cast ==
- Beresford Egan as Dr. Belhomme
- Marianne Stone as Jacqueline Fabre
- Lily Lapidus as Mme. Angeline
- Daphne Day as Blanche de Vigny
- Peter Noble as Michel Fournier
- Humberston Wright as Aristide Fabre
- Ethel Edwards as Countess de Fournier
- Charles Paton as night porter
- Jack Faint as first tribunal judge
- Cyril Conway as Paul Bonnet
- Beth Ross as Marie

== Reception ==
Kine Weekly wrote: "Crude, dishevelled costume piece ... hard to follow with the aid of a synopsis, let alone without, it has little to recommend it."

In British Sound Films: The Studio Years 1928–1959 David Quinlan rated the film as "mediocre", writing: "Cardboard historical drama."

Writing in The British 'B' Film, Chibnall and MacFarlane said: "The picture was ambitious in its French Revolutionary setting and its depiction of guillotine and tumbrel, but stolid in all other respects."
