= Niall Ferguson =

Scottish historian (born 1964)

Sir Niall Ferguson HonFRSE
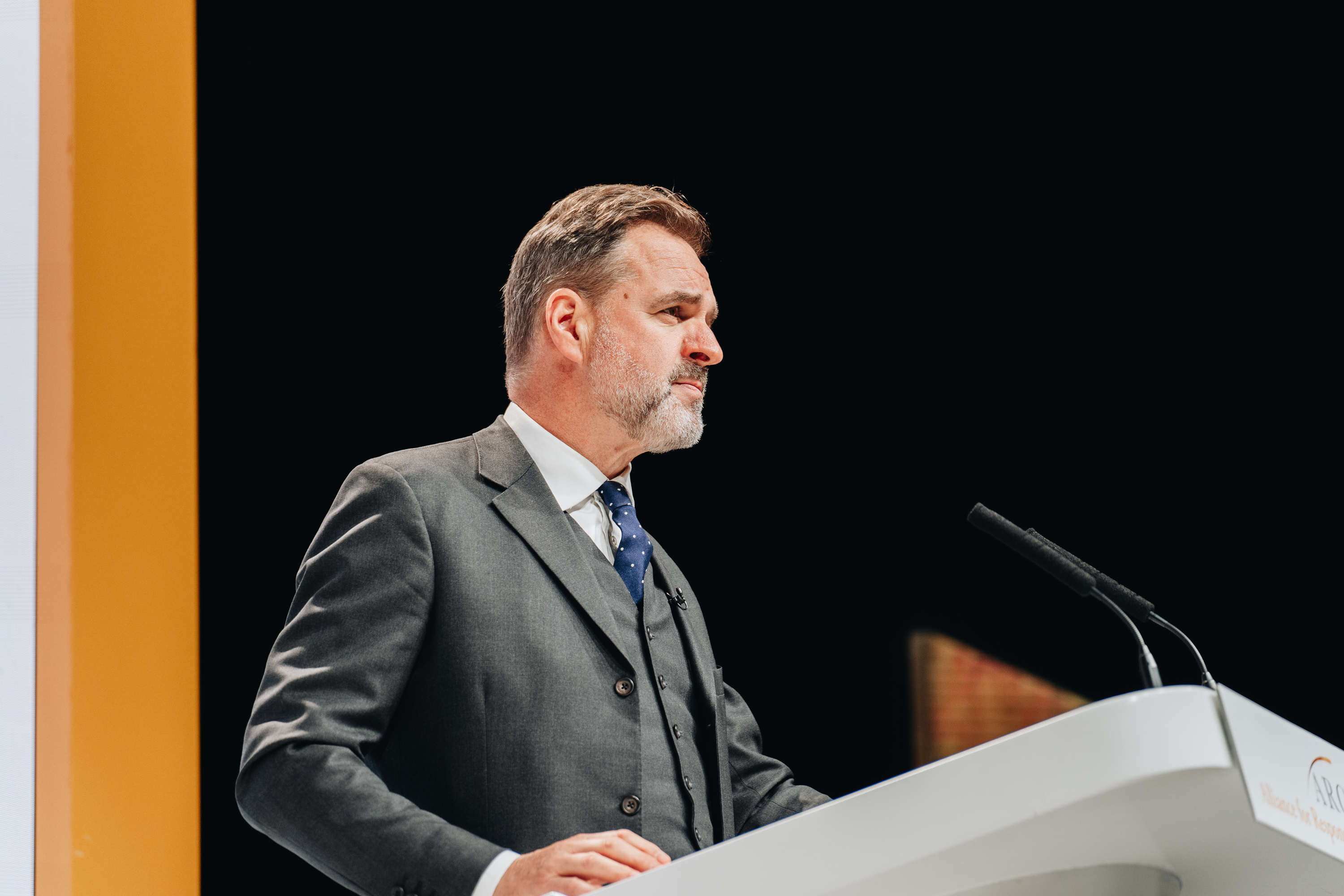
- Ferguson addresses the Alliance for Responsible Citizenship, London, 2023
- Born: Niall Campbell Ferguson; 18 April 1964 (age 62); Glasgow, Scotland
- Citizenship: United Kingdom; United States
- Spouses: Sue Douglas (m. 1994; div. 2011); Ayaan Hirsi Ali (m. 2011)
- Children: 5

Academic background
- Education: Magdalen College, Oxford (MA, DPhil); University of Hamburg
- Thesis: Business and Politics in the German Inflation (1989)
- Doctoral advisor: Norman Stone
- Influences: A. J. P. Taylor

Academic work
- Discipline: International history Economic history
- Institutions: University of Cambridge; University of Oxford; New York University; Harvard University; London School of Economics; Hoover Institution, Stanford University
- Doctoral students: Tyler Goodspeed
- Notable works: Empire: How Britain Made the Modern World (2003); Civilisation: the West and the Rest (2011)
- Niall Ferguson's voice Recorded June 2012 from the BBC Radio 4 programme the Reith Lectures
- Website: www.niallferguson.com

Sir Niall Campbell Ferguson HonFRSE (/niːl/ NEEL; born 18 April 1964) is a British and American historian who is the Milbank Family Senior Fellow at the Hoover Institution and a senior fellow at the Belfer Center for Science and International Affairs at Harvard University. Previously, he was a professor at Harvard University, the London School of Economics, New York University, a visiting professor at the New College of the Humanities, and a senior research fellow at Jesus College, Oxford. He was a visiting lecturer at the London School of Economics for the 2023/2024 academic year and at Tsinghua University in China from 2019 to 2020.

Ferguson writes and lectures on international history, economic history, financial history, and the history of the British Empire and American imperialism. He holds positive views concerning the British Empire. In 2004, he was one of Time magazine's 100 most influential people in the world. Ferguson has written and presented numerous television documentary series, including The Ascent of Money, which won an International Emmy Award for Best Documentary in 2009. In 2024, he was knighted by King Charles III for services to literature.

Ferguson has been a contributing editor for Bloomberg Television and a columnist for Newsweek. He began writing a semi-monthly column for Bloomberg Opinion in June 2020 and has also been a regular columnist at The Spectator and the Daily Mail. In 2021, he became a joint-founder of the new University of Austin. Since June 2024, he is a bi-weekly columnist at The Free Press. Ferguson has also contributed articles to many journals including Foreign Affairs and Foreign Policy. He has been described as a conservative and called himself a supporter of Ronald Reagan and Margaret Thatcher.

== Early life and education ==
Ferguson was born in Glasgow, Scotland, on 18 April 1964 to James Campbell Ferguson, a doctor, and Molly Archibald Hamilton, a physics teacher. Ferguson grew up in the Ibrox area of Glasgow in a home close to the Ibrox Park football stadium. He attended The Glasgow Academy. He was brought up as an atheist, although he has encouraged his children to study religion and attends church occasionally. In a 2023 interview with Jordan Peterson, Ferguson declared: "I'm a lapsed atheist ... I go to church every Sunday, precisely because having been brought up as an atheist, I came to realise in my career as a historian that not only is atheism a disastrous basis for a society ... but also because I don't think it can be a basis for individual ethical decision making."

Ferguson cites his father as instilling in him a strong sense of self-discipline and of the moral value of work, while his mother encouraged his creative side. His maternal grandfather, a journalist, encouraged him to write. He has described his parents as "both very much products of the Scottish Enlightenment". Ferguson ascribes his decision to read history at university instead of English literature to two main factors: Leo Tolstoy's reflections on history at the end of War and Peace, which he read as a schoolboy, and his admiration of historian A. J. P. Taylor, with Max Hastings quoting Ferguson as saying that he "wanted to be the AJP Taylor de nos jours".

=== Oxford ===
Ferguson received a demyship (highest scholarship) from Magdalen College, Oxford. While a student there, he wrote a 90-minute student film The Labours of Hercules Sprote, played double bass in a jazz band "Night in Tunisia", edited the student magazine Tributary, and befriended Andrew Sullivan, who shared his interest in right-wing politics and punk music. He had become a Thatcherite by 1982. In 1985, he graduated with a first-class honours degree in history and was awarded an MA from Oxford. Ferguson studied as a Hanseatic Scholar at the University of Hamburg from 1986 until 1988. He received his DPhil degree from the University of Oxford in 1989. His dissertation was titled "Business and Politics in the German Inflation: Hamburg 1914–1924".

== Career ==
=== Academic career ===
In 1989, Ferguson worked as a research fellow at Christ's College, Cambridge. From 1990 to 1992 he was an official fellow and lecturer at Peterhouse, Cambridge. He then became a fellow and tutor in modern history at Jesus College, Oxford, where in 2000 he was named a professor of political and financial history. In 2002 Ferguson became the John Herzog Professor in Financial History at New York University Stern School of Business, and in 2004 he became the Laurence A. Tisch Professor of History at Harvard University and William Ziegler Professor of Business Administration at Harvard Business School. From 2010 to 2011, Ferguson held the Philippe Roman Chair in history and international affairs at the London School of Economics. In 2016 Ferguson left Harvard to become a senior fellow at the Hoover Institution, where he had been an adjunct fellow since 2005. In 2021 he joined Bari Weiss, the Shakespeare scholar Pano Kanelos and the entrepreneur Joe Lonsdale to found the University of Austin. At the time, Ferguson said he was starting the college because "higher ed is broken". The private liberal arts college was approved to grant degrees in late 2023.

Ferguson has received honorary degrees from the University of Buckingham, Macquarie University (Australia) and Adolfo Ibáñez University (Chile). In May 2010, Michael Gove, UK education secretary, asked Ferguson to advise on the development of a new history syllabus, to be titled "history as a connected narrative", for schools in England and Wales. In June 2011, he joined other academics to set up the New College of the Humanities, a private college in London.

In 2018 at Stanford, emails were released to the public and university administrators which documented Ferguson's attempts to discredit a progressive activist student at Stanford University who had been critical of Ferguson's choices of speakers invited to the Cardinal Conversations free speech initiative. He teamed with a Republican Party student group to find information that might discredit the student. Ferguson resigned from leadership of the program once university administrators became aware of his actions. Ferguson responded in his column saying, "Re-reading my emails now, I am struck by their juvenile, jocular tone. 'A famous victory', I wrote the morning after the Murray event. 'Now we turn to the more subtle game of grinding them down on the committee. The price of liberty is eternal vigilance.' Then I added: 'Some opposition research on Mr O might also be worthwhile'—a reference to the leader of the protests. None of this happened. The meetings of the student committee were repeatedly postponed. No one ever did any digging on 'Mr O'. The spring vacation arrived. The only thing that came of the emails was that their circulation led to my stepping down."

=== Business ===
In 2000, Ferguson was a founding director of Boxmind, an Oxford-based educational technology company. In 2006, he set up Chimerica Media Ltd., a London-based television production company. In 2007, Ferguson was appointed as an investment management consultant by GLG Partners, to advise on geopolitical risk as well as current structural issues in economic behaviour relating to investment decisions. GLG is a UK-based hedge fund management firm headed by Noam Gottesman.

=== Politics and Society ===
Ferguson was an advisor to the John McCain 2008 presidential campaign and supported the Mitt Romney 2012 presidential campaign.

Ferguson serves on the Executive Advisory Board of the World.minds Foundation.

=== Commentary, documentaries and broadcasting ===
Ferguson has written regularly for British newspapers and magazines since the mid-1980s. At that time, he was lead writer for The Daily Telegraph and a regular book reviewer for The Daily Mail. In the summer of 1989, while travelling in Berlin, he wrote an article for a British newspaper with the provisional headline "The Berlin Wall is Crumbling", but it was not published. In the early 2000s he wrote a weekly column for The Sunday Telegraph and Los Angeles Times, leaving in 2007 to become a contributing editor to the Financial Times. Between 2008 and 2012, he wrote regularly for Newsweek.

Since 2015, Ferguson has written a weekly column for The Sunday Times and The Boston Globe, which also appears in numerous papers around the world. Ferguson's television series, The Ascent of Money, won the 2009 International Emmy award for Best Documentary. In 2011, his film company Chimerica Media released its first feature-length documentary, Kissinger, which won the New York Film Festival's prize for Best Documentary. In an interview with Peter Robinson, Ferguson recounted the "humiliation" his wife, Ayaan Hirsi Ali, endured at being disinvited from giving the commencement address at Brandeis University in 2014. Observing this to being a recurring phenomena as "a curious illiberal turn" for universities, including Harvard where he was teaching, and that this made him a critic of cancel culture. Prospect has since described him as one of the most prominent supporters of anti cancel-culture. Ferguson has said "Wokeism has gone from being a fringe fashion to be the dominant ideology of the universities."

==== Television documentaries ====
- Empire: How Britain Made the Modern World (2003)
- American Colossus (2004)
- The War of the World (2006)
- The Ascent of Money (2008)
- Civilization: Is the West History? (2011)
- Kissinger (2011)
- China: Triumph and Turmoil (2012)
- The Pity of War (2014)
- Networld (2020)

==== BBC Reith Lectures ====
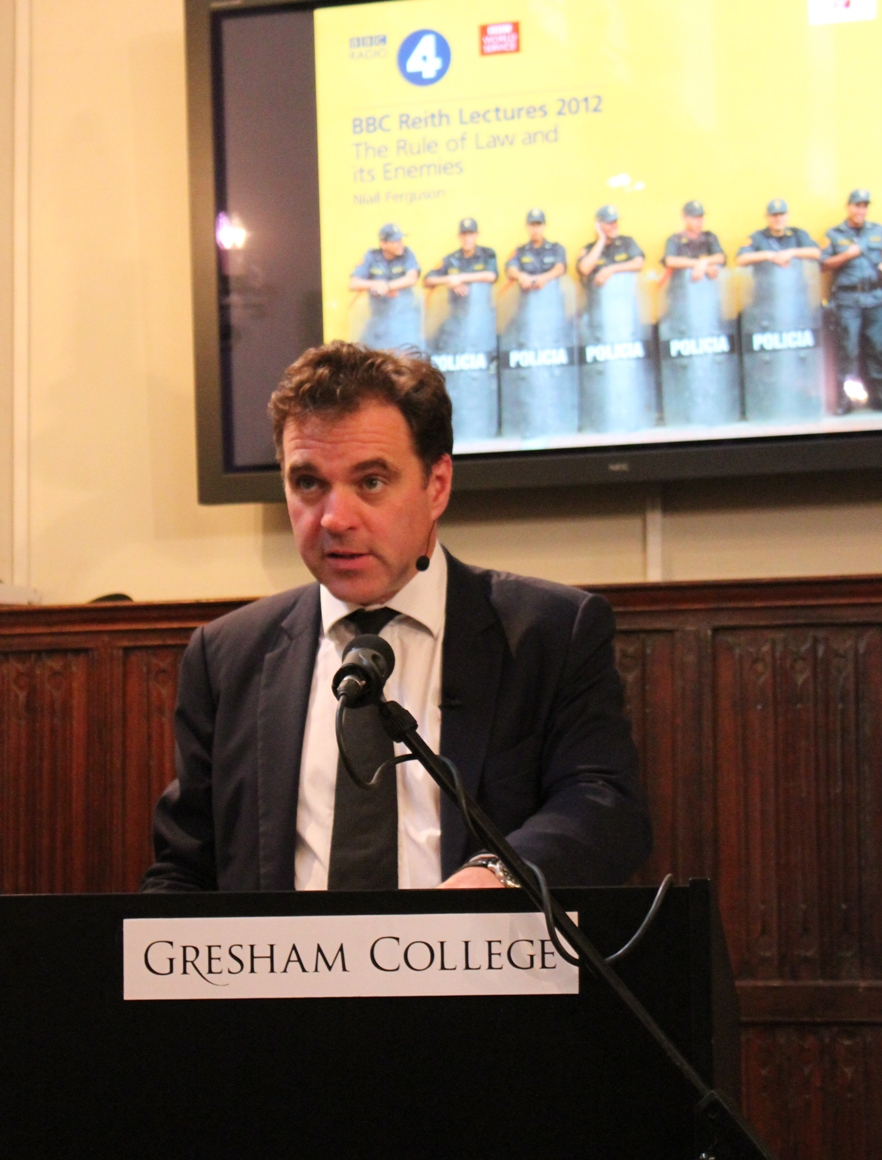
Niall Ferguson recording the third of his 2012 BBC Reith Lecture at Gresham College

In May 2012, the BBC announced Niall Ferguson was to present its annual Reith Lectures. These four lectures, titled The Rule of Law and its Enemies, examine the role man-made institutions have played in the economic and political spheres. In the first lecture, held at the London School of Economics, titled The Human Hive, Ferguson argues for greater openness from governments, saying they should publish accounts which clearly state all assets and liabilities. He said that governments should also follow the lead of business and adopt the Generally Accepted Accounting Principles, and above all generational accounts should be prepared on a regular basis to make absolutely clear the inter-generational implications of current fiscal policy. In the lecture, Ferguson says young voters should be more supportive of government austerity measures if they do not wish to pay further down the line for the profligacy of the baby boomer generation.

In the second lecture, The Darwinian Economy, Ferguson reflects on the causes of the 2008 financial crisis, and allegedly erroneous conclusions that many people have drawn from it about the role of regulation, and asks whether regulation is in fact "the disease of which it purports to be the cure". The Landscape of Law was the third lecture, delivered at Gresham College. It examines the rule of law in comparative terms, asking how far the common law's claims to superiority over other systems are credible, and whether we are living through a time of "creeping legal degeneration" in the English-speaking world. The fourth and final lecture, Civil and Uncivil Societies, focuses on institutions (outside the political, economic and legal realms) designed to preserve and transmit particular knowledge and values. Ferguson asks whether the modern state is quietly killing civil society in the Western world, and what non-Western societies can do to build a vibrant civil society. The first lecture was broadcast on BBC Radio 4 and the BBC World Service on Tuesday, 19 June 2012. The series is available as a BBC podcast.

=== Books ===
==== The Cash Nexus ====
In his 2001 book, The Cash Nexus, which he wrote following a year as Houblon-Norman Fellow at the Bank of England, Ferguson argues that the popular saying "money makes the world go 'round'" is wrong; instead he presented a case for human actions in history motivated by far more than just economic concerns.

==== Empire: How Britain Made the Modern World ====
In his 2003 book, Empire: How Britain Made the Modern World, Ferguson conducts a provocative reinterpretation of the British Empire, casting it as one of the world's great modernising forces. The Empire produced durable changes and globalisation with steampower, telegraphs, and engineers. Bernard Porter, famous for expressing his views during the Porter–MacKenzie debate on the British Empire, attacked Empire in The London Review of Books as a "panegyric to British colonialism". In response to this, Ferguson drew Porter's attention to the conclusion of the book, where he writes: "No one would claim that the record of the British Empire was unblemished. On the contrary, I have tried to show how often it failed to live up to its own ideal of individual liberty, particularly in the early era of enslavement, transportation and the 'ethnic cleansing' of indigenous peoples." Despite this, Ferguson argues that the British Empire was still preferable to German and Japanese rule at the time:

The 19th-century empire undeniably pioneered free trade, free capital movements and, with the abolition of slavery, free labour. It invested immense sums in developing a global network of modern communications. It spread and enforced the rule of law over vast areas. Though it fought many small wars, the empire maintained a global peace unmatched before or since. In the 20th century too the empire more than justified its own existence. For the alternatives to British rule represented by the German and Japanese empires were clearly—and they admitted it themselves—far worse. And without its empire, it is inconceivable that Britain could have withstood them.

The book was the subject for a documentary series on British television network Channel 4.

==== Colossus: The Rise and Fall of the American Empire ====
In his 2005 book, Colossus: The Rise and Fall of the American Empire, Ferguson proposes that the United States aspires to globalize free markets, the rule of law, and representative government but shies away from the long-term commitments of manpower and money that are indispensable in taking a more active role in resolving conflict arising from the failure of states. The United States is an empire in denial, not acknowledging the scale of global responsibilities. The American writer Michael Lind, responding to Ferguson's advocation of an enlarged American military through conscription, accused Ferguson of engaging in apocalyptic alarmism about the possibility of a world without the United States as the dominant power and of a casual disregard for the value of human life.

==== War of the World ====
In War of the World, published in 2006, Ferguson argued that a combination of economic volatility, decaying empires, psychopathic dictators, racially/ethnically motivated and institutionalised violence resulted in the wars and genocides of what he calls "History's Age of Hatred". The New York Times Book Review named War of the World one of the 100 Notable Books of the Year in 2006, while the International Herald Tribune called it "one of the most intriguing attempts by an historian to explain man's inhumanity to man". Ferguson addresses the paradox that, though the 20th century was "so bloody", it was also "a time of unparalleled [economic] progress". As with his earlier work Empire, War of the World was accompanied by a Channel 4 television series presented by Ferguson.

==== The Ascent of Money ====
Published in 2008, The Ascent of Money examines the history of money, credit, and banking. In it, Ferguson predicts a financial crisis as a result of the world economy and in particular the United States using too much credit. He cites the China–United States dynamic which he refers to as Chimerica where an Asian "savings glut" helped create the subprime mortgage crisis with an influx of easy money.

==== Civilization ====
Published in 2011, Civilization: The West and the Rest examines what Ferguson calls the most "interesting question" of our day: "Why, beginning around 1500, did a few small polities on the western end of the Eurasian landmass come to dominate the rest of the world?". In the review of Ferguson's book, The Economist wrote:

In 1500 Europe's future imperial powers controlled 10% of the world's territories and generated just over 40% of its wealth. By 1913, at the height of empire, the West controlled almost 60% of the territories, which together generated almost 80% of the wealth. This stunning fact is lost, he regrets, on a generation that has supplanted history's sweep with a feeble-minded relativism that holds "all civilisations as somehow equal".

Ferguson attributes this divergence to the West's development of six "killer apps", which he finds were largely missing elsewhere in the world in 1500 – "competition, the scientific method, the rule of law, modern medicine, consumerism and the Protestant work ethic". Ferguson compared and contrasted how the West's "killer apps" allowed the West to triumph over "the Rest" citing examples. Ferguson argued the rowdy and savage competition between European merchants created far more wealth than did the static and ordered society of Qing China. Tolerance extended to thinkers like Sir Isaac Newton in Stuart England had no counterpart in the Ottoman Empire, where Takiyuddin's state built observatory was eventually demolished due to political conflict. This ensured that Western civilization was capable of making scientific advances that Ottoman civilization never could. Respect for private property was far stronger in British America than it ever was in Spanish America, which led to Anglo-America (the United States and Canada) becoming prosperous societies while Latin America was and remains mired in poverty. Ferguson also argued that the modern West had lost its edge and the future belongs to the nations of Asia, especially China, which has adopted the West's "killer apps". Ferguson argues that in the coming years, we will see a steady decline of the West, while China and the rest of the Asian nations will be the rising powers. A related documentary Civilization: Is the West History? was broadcast as a six-part series on Channel 4 in March and April 2011.

==== Kissinger: 1923–1968: The Idealist ====
Kissinger The Idealist, Volume I, published in September 2015, is the first part of a planned two-part biography of Henry Kissinger based on his private papers. The book starts with a quote from a letter which Kissinger wrote in 1972. The book examines Kissinger's life from being a refugee and fleeing Nazi Germany in 1938, to serving in the United States Army as a "free man" in World War II, to studying at Harvard. The book explores the history of Kissinger joining the Kennedy administration and later becoming critical of its foreign policy, to supporting Nelson Rockefeller on three failed presidential bids, to joining the Nixon administration. The book includes Kissinger's early evaluation of the Vietnam War and his efforts to negotiate with the North Vietnamese in Paris (Paris Peace Accords). Historians and political scientists gave the book mixed reviews.

In a review about The Idealist, The Economist wrote: "Mr Ferguson, a British historian also at Harvard, has in the past sometimes produced work that is rushed and uneven. Not here. Like Mr Kissinger or loathe him, this is a work of engrossing scholarship." In a negative review of The Idealist, the American journalist Michael O'Donnell questioned Ferguson's interpretation of Kissinger's actions leading up to Nixon's election in 1968 as United States president. Andrew Roberts praised the book in The New York Times, concluding: "Niall Ferguson already has many important, scholarly and controversial books to his credit. But if the second volume of 'Kissinger' is anywhere near as comprehensive, well written and riveting as the first, this will be his masterpiece."

==== The Square and the Tower ====
In 2018's The Square and the Tower, Ferguson proposed a modified version of group selection that history can be explained by the evolution of human networks. He wrote, "Man, with his unrivaled neural network, was born to network." The title refers to a transition from hierarchical "tower" networks to flatter "square" network connections between individuals. In a review of the book, John Gray was not convinced. He wrote, "[Ferguson] offers a mix of metaphor and what purports to be a new science." In The Wall Street Journal, Deirdre McCloskey wrote: "Niall Ferguson has again written a brilliant book, this time in defence of traditional top-down principles of governing the wild market and the wilder international order. The Square and the Tower raises the question of just how much the unruly world should be governed – and by whom. Not everyone will agree, but everyone will be charmed and educated. ... The Square and the Tower is always readable, intelligent, original. You can swallow a chapter a night before sleep and your dreams will overflow with scenes of Stendhal's The Red and the Black, Napoleon, Kissinger. In 400 pages you will have restocked your mind. Do it."

==== Doom: The Politics of Catastrophe ====
In this book, Ferguson offers a global history of disaster. Damon Linker of The New York Times argues that the book is "often insightful, productively provocative and downright brilliant", and suggests that Ferguson displays "an impressive command of the latest research in a large number of specialized fields, among them medical history, epidemiology, probability theory, cliodynamics and network theory." Linker also criticises the book's "perplexing lacunae". In a review for The Times of London, David Aaronovitch described Ferguson's theory as "nebulous".

==== Kissinger, 1969–2023: The Player ====
Ferguson has spoken with some regret of not having been able to finish his two volume biography of Kissinger while Kissinger was still alive; as of 2026, an announced publication date has not been set by the publisher.

== Opinions, views and research ==
Ferguson has been referred to as a conservative historian by some commentators and fellow historians. Ferguson himself stated in a 2018 interview on the Rubin Report that his views align to classical liberalism, and has referred to himself as a "classic Scottish enlightenment liberal" on other occasions. Some of his research and conclusions have been criticised by commentators on the political left. In a 2011 interview, Ferguson said elements of the left "love being provoked by me! Honestly, it makes them feel so much better about their lives to think that I'm a reactionary; it's a substitute for thought. 'Imperialist scumbag' and all that. Oh dear, we're back in a 1980s student union debate." Ferguson endorsed Kemi Badenoch's campaign during the July 2022 Conservative Party leadership election.

=== World War I ===
In 1998, Ferguson published The Pity of War: Explaining World War One, which with the help of research assistants he was able to write in just five months. This is an analytic account of what Ferguson considered to be the ten great myths of the Great War. The book generated much controversy, particularly Ferguson's suggestion that it might have proved more beneficial for Europe if Britain had stayed out of the First World War in 1914, thereby allowing Germany to win.

Ferguson has argued that the British decision to intervene was what stopped a German victory in 1914–15. Furthermore, Ferguson expressed disagreement with the Sonderweg interpretation of German history championed by some German historians such as Fritz Fischer, Hans-Ulrich Wehler, Hans Mommsen, and Wolfgang Mommsen, who argued that the German Empire deliberately started an aggressive war in 1914. Likewise, Ferguson has often attacked the work of the German historian Michael Stürmer, who argued that it was Germany's geographical situation in Central Europe that determined the course of German history. On the contrary, Ferguson maintained that Germany waged a preventive war in 1914, a war largely forced on the Germans by reckless and irresponsible British diplomacy. In particular, Ferguson accused the British foreign secretary Sir Edward Grey of maintaining an ambiguous attitude to the question of whether Britain would enter the war or not, and thus confusing Berlin over just what was the British attitude towards the question of intervention in the war.

Ferguson accused London of unnecessarily allowing a regional war in Europe to escalate into a world war. Moreover, Ferguson denied that the origins of National Socialism could be traced back to Imperial Germany; instead Ferguson asserted the origins of Nazism could only be traced back to the First World War and its aftermath.

Ferguson attacked a number of ideas that he called "myths" in the book. They are listed here (with his counter-arguments in parentheses):

- That Germany was a highly militarist country before 1914 (Ferguson claims Germany was Europe's most anti-militarist country).
- That naval challenges mounted by Germany drove Britain into informal alliances with France and Russia before 1914 (Ferguson claims the British chose alliances with France and Russia as a form of appeasement due to the strength of those nations, and an Anglo-German alliance failed to materialize due to German weakness).
- That British foreign policy was driven by legitimate fears of Germany (Ferguson claims Germany posed no threat to Britain before 1914, and that all British fears of Germany were due to irrational anti-German prejudices).
- That the pre-1914 arms race was consuming ever larger portions of national budgets at an unsustainable rate (Ferguson claims that the only limitations on more military spending before 1914 were political, not economic).
- That World War I was, as Fritz Fischer claimed, a war of aggression on the part of Germany that necessitated British involvement to stop Germany from conquering Europe (Ferguson claims that if Germany had been victorious, something like the European Union would have been created in 1914, and that it would have been for the best if Britain had chosen to opt out of war in 1914).
- That most people were happy with the outbreak of war in 1914 (Ferguson claims that most Europeans were saddened by the coming of war).
- That propaganda was successful in making men wish to fight (Ferguson argues the opposite).
- That the Allies made the best use of their economic resources (Ferguson argues that the Allies "squandered" their economic resources).
- That the British and the French had the better armies (Ferguson claims the German Army was superior).
- That the Allies were more efficient at killing Germans (Ferguson argues that the Germans were more efficient at killing the Allies).
- That most soldiers hated fighting in the war (Ferguson argues most soldiers fought more or less willingly).
- That the British treated German prisoners of war well (Ferguson argues the British routinely killed German POWs).
- That Germany was faced with reparations after 1921 that could not be paid except at ruinous economic cost (Ferguson argues that Germany could easily have paid reparations had there been the political will).

Ferguson uses counterfactual history in the book. He presents a hypothetical version of Europe being, under Imperial German domination, a peaceful, prosperous, democratic continent, without ideologies like communism or Italian fascism. In Ferguson's view, had Germany won World War I, then the lives of millions would have been saved, something like the European Union would have been founded in 1914, and Britain would have remained an empire as well as the world's dominant financial power.

The French historians Stéphane Audoin-Rouzeau and Annette Becker were dubious about much of Ferguson's methodology and conclusions in The Pity of War, but praised him for the chapter dealing with the executions of POWs, arguing that Ferguson had exposed a dark side of the war that until then had been ignored. About The Pity of War, the American academic Michael Lind wrote:

Like the historian John Charmley, who expressed the same wish in the case of World War II, Ferguson belongs to the fringe element of British conservatism that regrets the absence of a German-British deal in the first half of the 20th century that would have marginalized the United States and might have allowed the British Empire to survive to this day. According to Ferguson, Britain should have stayed out of World War I and allowed Imperial Germany to smash France and Russia and create a continental empire from the Atlantic to the Middle East. The joke is on Ferguson's American conservative admirers, inasmuch as he laments the defeat of the Kaiser's Germany because it accelerated the replacement of the British Empire by the United States of America and the eclipse of the City of London by Wall Street.

The German-born American historian Gerhard Weinberg in a review of The Pity of War strongly criticized Ferguson for advancing the thesis that it was idiotic for Britain to have fought a Germany that allegedly posed no danger. Weinberg accused Ferguson of completely ignoring the chief foreign policy aim of Wilhelm II from 1897 onwards, namely Weltpolitik ("World Politics"), and argued it was absurd for Ferguson to claim that allowing Germany to defeat France and Russia would have posed no danger to Britain. Weinberg wrote that Ferguson was wrong to claim that Germany's interests were limited only to Europe, and maintained that if the Reich had defeated France in 1914, then Germany would have taken over the French colonies in Asia and Africa, which would have definitely affected the balance of power all over the world, not just in Europe. Finally, Weinberg attacked Ferguson for claiming that the Tirpitz Plan was not a danger to Britain and that Britain had no reason to fear Germany's naval ambitions, sarcastically asking if that was really the case, then why did the British redeploy so much of their fleet from around the world to the North Sea and spend so much money building warships in the Anglo-German naval arms race? Weinberg accused Ferguson of distorting both German and British history and ignoring any evidence that did not fit with his thesis that Britain should never have fought Germany, stating that The Pity of War was interesting as a historical provocation but was not persuasive as history.

=== Rothschilds ===
Ferguson wrote two volumes about the prominent Rothschild family: The House of Rothschild: Volume 1: Money's Prophets: 1798–1848 and The House of Rothschild: Volume 2: The World's Banker: 1849–1999. These books were the result of original archival research. The books won the Wadsworth Prize for Business History and were also short-listed for the Jewish Quarterly-Wingate Literary Award and the American National Jewish Book Award.

The books were widely acclaimed by historians, although they received some criticism. John Lewis Gaddis, a Cold War-era historian, praised Ferguson's "unrivaled range, productivity and visibility", while criticising the book as unpersuasive and containing contradictory claims. Marxist historian Eric Hobsbawm had praised Ferguson as an excellent historian but criticised him as a "nostalgist for empire". In a mixed review of a later book by Ferguson, The War of the World: History's Age of Hatred, a reviewer for The Economist described how many regard Ferguson's two books on the Rothschilds "as one of the finest studies of its kind". Jeremy Wormell wrote that while The World's Banker: A History of the House of Rothschild had its virtues, it contained "many errors" which meant it was "unsafe to use it as a source for the debt markets".

Writing in The New York Review of Books, Robert Skidelsky praised Ferguson, stating: "Taken together, Ferguson's two volumes are a stupendous achievement, a triumph of historical research and imagination. No serious historian can write about the connection between the politics, diplomacy, and economics of the nineteenth century in the same way again. And, as any good work of history should do, it constantly prompts us to ask questions about our own age, when once again we have embarked on the grand experiment of a world economy without a world government."

=== Counterfactual history ===
Ferguson sometimes uses counterfactual history, also known as "speculative" or "hypothetical" history, and edited a collection of essays, titled Virtual History: Alternatives and Counterfactuals (1997), exploring the subject. Ferguson likes to imagine alternative outcomes as a way of stressing the contingent aspects of history. For Ferguson, great forces don't make history; individuals do, and nothing is predetermined. Thus, for Ferguson, there are no paths in history that will determine how things will work out. The world is neither progressing nor regressing; only the actions of individuals determine whether we will live in a better or worse world. His championing of the method has been controversial within the field. In a 2011 review of Ferguson's book Civilization: The West and the Rest, Noel Malcolm (senior research fellow in history at All Souls College at Oxford University) stated: "Students may find this an intriguing introduction to a wide range of human history; but they will get an odd idea of how historical argument is to be conducted, if they learn it from this book."

=== Henry Kissinger ===
In 2003, former American secretary of state Henry Kissinger provided Ferguson with access to his White House diaries, letters, and archives for what Ferguson calls a "warts-and-all biography" of Kissinger. In 2015, he published the first volume in a two-part biography titled Kissinger: 1923–1968: The Idealist from Penguin Press. The thesis of this first volume was that Kissinger was greatly influenced in his academic and political development by the philosopher Immanuel Kant, and especially by an interpretation of Kant that he learned from a mentor at Harvard University, William Yandell Elliott.

=== British Empire ===
Ferguson has defended the British Empire, stating, "I think it's hard to make the case, which implicitly the left makes, that somehow the world would have been better off if the Europeans had stayed home." Ferguson is critical of what he calls the "self-flagellation" that he says characterises modern European thought.

The moral simplification urge is an extraordinarily powerful one, especially in this country, where imperial guilt can lead to self-flagellation. ... And it leads to very simplistic judgments. The rulers of western Africa prior to the European empires were not running some kind of scout camp. They were engaged in the Atlantic slave trade. They showed zero sign of developing the country's economic resources. Did Senegal ultimately benefit from French rule? Yes, it's clear. And the counterfactual idea that somehow the indigenous rulers would have been more successful in economic development doesn't have any credibility at all.

==== Critical views of Ferguson and empire ====
Historians and commentators have considered his views on this issue and expressed their critical evaluation in various terms, from "audacious" yet "wrong", "informative", "ambitious" and "troubling", to "false and dangerous" apologia. Richard Drayton, Rhodes Professor of Imperial History at King's College London, has stated that it was correct of Seumas Milne to associate "Ferguson with an attempt to 'rehabilitate empire' in the service of contemporary great power interests". In November 2011, Pankaj Mishra reviewed Civilisation: The West and the Rest unfavourably in the London Review of Books. Ferguson demanded an apology and threatened to sue Mishra on charges of libel due to allegations of racism.

Jon Wilson, a professor of the Department of History at King's College London, who is the author of India Conquered, a 2016 book intended to rebut Ferguson's arguments in Empire: How Britain Made the Modern World, catalogues the negative elements of the British Raj, and describes the Empire TV program (2003) as "false and dangerous". Wilson agrees with Ferguson's point that the British innovations brought to India civil services, education, and railways, and had beneficial side effects, but faults them for being done in a spirit of self-interest rather than altruism.

About Ferguson's claim that Britain "made the modern world" by spreading democracy, free trade, capitalism, the rule of law, Protestantism, and the English language, Wilson charged that Ferguson never explained precisely how this was done, arguing that the reason was the lack of interest in the history of the people ruled by the British on Ferguson's part, who therefore could not perceive that the interaction between the colonisers and the colonised in places like India, where the population embraced aspects of British culture and rule that were appealing to them while rejecting others that were unappealing. Wilson argues that this interaction between the rulers and the ruled is more complex, and contradicts Ferguson's one-sided picture of the British "transforming" India that portrays the British as active and the Indians as passive. Wilson charged that Ferguson failed to look at the empire via non-British eyes because to do so would be to challenge his claim that Britain "made the modern world" by imposing its values on "the Other", and that the history of the empire was far more complicated than the simplistic version that Ferguson is trying to present.

=== Islam and "Eurabia" ===
Ferguson has endorsed the work of Bat Ye'or and her Eurabia conspiracy theory, providing a cover comment for her 2005 Eurabia book, in which he stated that "no writer has done more than Bat Ye'or to draw attention to the menacing character of Islamic extremism. Future historians will one day regard her coinage of the term 'Eurabia' as prophetic." Matthew Carr wrote in Race & Class that "Niall Ferguson, the conservative English historian and enthusiastic advocate of a new American empire, has also embraced the Eurabian idea in a widely reproduced article entitled 'Eurabia?'", in which he laments the "de-Christianization of Europe" and the secularism of the continent that leaves it "weak in the face of fanaticism". Carr adds that "Ferguson sees the recent establishment of a department of Islamic studies in his (Oxford college) as another symptom of 'the creeping Islamicization of a decadent Christendom'", and in a 2004 lecture at the American Enterprise Institute entitled "The End of Europe?"

Ferguson struck a similarly Spenglerian note, conjuring the term "impire" to depict a process in which a 'political entity, instead of expanding outwards towards its periphery, exporting power, implodes—when the energies come from outside into that entity'. In Ferguson's opinion, this process was already under way in a decadent 'post-Christian' Europe that was drifting inexorably towards the dark denouement of a vanquished civilisation and the fatal embrace of Islam.

Ferguson deplored the November 2015 Paris attacks committed by Islamic State terrorists but stated he was not going to "stand" with the French as he argued that France was a lost cause, a declining state faced with an unstoppable Islamic wave that would sweep away everything that tried to oppose it. Ferguson compared the modern European Union to the Western Roman Empire, describing modern Europe as not that different from the world depicted by Edward Gibbon in his book The History of the Decline and Fall of the Roman Empire. Ferguson wrote:

Uncannily similar processes are destroying the European Union today... Let us be clear about what is happening. Like the Roman Empire in the early fifth century, Europe has allowed its defenses to crumble. As its wealth has grown, so its military prowess has shrunk, along with its self-belief. It has grown decadent in its shopping malls and sports stadiums. At the same time, it has opened its gates to outsiders who have coveted its wealth without renouncing their ancestral faith.

About the 2015 European migrant crisis, Ferguson wrote the mass influx of refugees into Europe from Syria was a modern version of the Völkerwanderung when the Germanic peoples invaded the Roman Empire, rapidly smashing their way in as the Romans attempted unsuccessfully to stop them. Ferguson argued that Gibbon was wrong to claim the Roman Empire collapsed slowly and argues that the view among a growing number of modern scholars is that the collapse of the Roman Empire was swift and violent; unforeseeable by Romans of the day, just as the collapse of modern European civilization would likewise be for modern Europeans. In 2017, Ferguson opined that the West had insufficiently heeded the rise of militant Islam and its global consequences in the same way it failed to predict that the rise of Vladimir Lenin would lead to the further spread of communism and conflict around the world.

Ask yourself how effectively we in the West have responded to the rise of militant Islam since the Iranian Revolution unleashed its Shi'ite variant and since 9/11 revealed the even more aggressive character of Sunni Islamism. I fear we have done no better than our grandfathers did.

Foreign intervention—the millions of dollars that have found their way from the Gulf to radical mosques and Islamic centres in the West.

Incompetent liberals—the proponents of multiculturalism who brand any opponent of jihad an "Islamophobe". Clueless bankers—the sort who fall over themselves to offer "sharia-compliant" loans and bonds. Fellow travellers—the leftists who line up with the Muslim Brotherhood to castigate Israel at every opportunity. And the faint-hearted—those who were so quick to pull out of Iraq in 2009 that they allowed the rump of al-Qaeda to morph into Isis.

A century ago it was the West's great blunder to think it would not matter if Lenin and his confederates took over the Russian Empire, despite their stated intention to plot world revolution and overthrow both democracy and capitalism. Incredible as it may seem, I believe we are capable of repeating that catastrophic error. I fear that, one day, we shall wake with a start to discover that the Islamists have repeated the Bolshevik achievement, which was to acquire the resources and capability to threaten our existence.

During a 2018 debate, Ferguson asserted that he is not anti-immigration or opposed to Muslims but felt that sections of Europe's political and intellectual classes had failed to predict the cultural and political consequences of large scale immigration. He stated that Islam differs from Judaism and Christianity through being "designed differently" as a political ideology that does not recognize the separation of mosque with the secular and temporal, and that the Muslim world has mostly followed an opposite trend to Western society by becoming less secularized and more literal in interpreting holy scripture. He concluded that if Europe kept pursuing large scale migration from pious Muslim societies combined with poor structures of economic and cultural integration, especially in an era when existing migrant communities are either unassimilated or loosely integrated into the host society, it is "highly likely" that networks of fundamentalist dawah will grow in which Islamic extremists draw in the culturally and economically unassimilated Muslims of immigrant backgrounds. Ferguson observed that even when living in Western nations, both he and his wife Ayaan Hirsi Ali have to live with permanent security measures as a result of her public critiques of Islam and status as a former Muslim.

=== Iraq War ===
Ferguson supported the Iraq War and described himself a month after the invasion of Iraq in 2003, as 'a fully paid-up member of the neo-imperialist gang' and he is on record as being not necessarily opposed to future Western incursions around the world.

It's all very well for us to sit here in the West with our high incomes and cushy lives, and say it's immoral to violate the sovereignty of another state. But if the effect of that is to bring people in that country economic and political freedom, to raise their standard of living, to increase their life expectancy, then don't rule it out.

=== Donald Trump ===
Ferguson was initially skeptical of Donald Trump's bid for the 2016 United States presidential election. During the 2016 Republican Party presidential primaries, Ferguson was quoted in early 2016: "If you bother to read some of the serious analysis of Trump's support, you realize that it's a very fragile thing and highly unlikely to deliver what he needs in the crucial first phase of the primaries ... By the time we get to March–April, it's all over. I think there's going to be a wonderful catharsis, I'm really looking forward to it: Trump's humiliation. Bring it on." Trump eventually won the nomination. After Brexit, Ferguson stated that Trump could win via the Electoral College if certain demographics turned out to vote in key swing states. Three weeks before the 2016 presidential election, after the Access Hollywood tape scandal, Ferguson stated in an interview that it "was over for Donald Trump", that "Trump had flamed out in all three Presidential debates", that "I don't think there can be any last minute surprise to rescue him [Trump]", and that there was no hope of Trump winning Independent voters and that Trump was "gone as a candidate", adding that "it seems to me clear that she [Hillary Clinton] is going to be the first female President of the United States. The only question is how bad does his [Trump's] flaming out affect candidates for the Senate, candidates for the House, further down on the ballot."

In 2018, Ferguson argued that a Clinton presidency would have been more disruptive to the United States, and that Clinton would have been "immediately" impeached as Trump supporters would have likely believed that the election was rigged. Ferguson stated that he regarded himself "in the middle ground" in a generally polarized public and media opinion on Trump's presidency. He elaborated that while he found Trump's personality "pretty hard to take", he cited several positive achievements undertaken by his administration, including America's stronger economic performance, and noted that he found Trump's foreign policy stances on China, North Korea, and the Middle East an improvement over that of the Obama administration. He further opined that the media were more focused on Trump's behaviour on social media than the "competent job" being done by members of his administration. In 2019, he wrote an op-ed in The New York Times arguing that the China–United States trade war was the beginning of a Second Cold War between the United States and China, and that despite the risks of the showdown the introduction of an external enemy similar to the Soviet Union could prove beneficial by reducing political polarization in the United States.

During the 2020 United States presidential election, Ferguson observed that, contrary to arguments from Trump's opponents that he only appealed to older White men, statistics showed that his support among Black and Latino voters had risen. He opined that Joe Biden was likely to win the presidency but that the Democratic Party would not see a "blue wave" of support as it had tried to turn the election into "a referendum on Trump's handling of COVID-19" when there "hasn't been anything exceptionally bad about American performance", and that the Democrats had misjudged the mood of voters concerned about law and order following the Black Lives Matter protests. After the election was concluded, Ferguson stated that both Trump and the "far-left of the Democratic Party" had lost. Ferguson condemned the 2021 United States Capitol attack committed by supporters of Trump, arguing on Twitter that the participants should be prosecuted and Trump's behaviour had cost the Republicans the Senate. He also argued that politicians who refused to condemn the event were unsuited for office. He argued that Trumpism was likely to remain a force within American politics and likened it to Jacobite Pretenders who sought to revolt in order to restore the House of Stuart to the British royal throne after the Glorious Revolution.

In a May 2023 article for The Spectator, Ferguson hypothesized that a Trump victory in both the 2024 Republican Party presidential primaries and 2024 United States presidential election was a highly plausible outcome despite a "campaign of lawfare" against the former president and that tactical Democratic Party schemes or hopes for Trump to secure the nomination so as to campaign on an anti-Trump platform stand a strong chance of backfiring. Ferguson observed that Biden's approval ratings were lower at the time of writing than Trump's were in office and highlighted that other leaders, such as Brazil's Luiz Inácio Lula da Silva, Italy's Silvio Berlusconi, and Malaysia's Anwar Ibrahim, were able to engineer political comebacks after being barred from politics. He further stated "the perception that Democratic operatives are using the legal system for political ends will likely help him win votes. It's a much better story than his earlier claim that the 2020 election was stolen, which now bores almost everyone except Trump himself. It may seem paradoxical that the Democrats are harassing Trump in the courts if they want to run against him. But it makes sense: the prospect of him performing the perp walk attracts media coverage, and media coverage is the free publicity on which Trump has always thrived. Every column inch or minute of airtime his legal battles earn him is an inch or a minute less for his Republican rivals for the nomination."

In September 2023, Ferguson again opined that the Democrats were likely to lose the White House to Trump unless Biden stepped down. He compared Trump's bid to Grover Cleveland who served two non-consecutive terms, arguing that Biden was polling similar numbers to Gerald Ford and George H. W. Bush ahead of elections they lost after one term, and that Biden's desire to keep Kamala Harris as a running mate would harm his campaign due to her even poorer approval ratings. He also argued that scandals involving Hunter Biden would furthermore hinder Biden's image by causing voters to feel less concern about Trump's indictments as both cases would heighten public perception that all politicians are crooks. Ferguson concluded that the only real option for the Democrats to defeat Trump if he won the Republican nomination would be to oust Biden and nominate a younger candidate, and added: "My money is on Newsom."

In an interview with CNBC in September 2024, Ferguson disputed arguments that Trump represented a threat to American democracy and argued that the Harris campaign was unlikely to persuade the public to vote against Trump by making this claim. Ferguson argued that Trump's "greatest weakness" was his conduct during the 2021 United States Capitol riot and refusal to accept the 2020 election result but noted that the "system contained Trump's impulses successfully in 2020 and 2021", and said that the problem with the Democratic claim that he is a threat to democracy is that for many ordinary voters it sounds overdone and is not as compelling an argument as it was in the past because voters have seen a Trump presidency.

=== Trump's "New World Order" ===
In an article from November 2016 in The Boston Globe, Ferguson advised that Trump should support the efforts of the prime minister Theresa May to have the United Kingdom leave the European Union as the best way of breaking up the European Union, and sign a free trade agreement with the United Kingdom once Brexit is complete. To stabilise international relations, Ferguson speculated that Trump could give recognition to Russia as a great power, and work with Russian president Vladimir Putin by giving Russia a sphere of influence in Eurasia. In the same column, Ferguson advised Trump not to engage in a trade war with China, and seek a policy of co-evolution with General Secretary of the Chinese Communist Party Xi Jinping. Ferguson argued that Trump and Putin could work for the victory of Marine Le Pen (an advocate of Frexit) and the National Front in the 2017 French presidential election, arguing that Le Pen was the French politician most congenial to the Trump administration. Ferguson argued that a quintumvirate of Trump, Putin, Xi, May, and Le Pen could then result in a stable "world order" that would reduce the likelihood of international conflict.

=== Economic policy ===
In its edition of 15 August 2005, The New Republic published "The New New Deal", an essay by Ferguson and Laurence J. Kotlikoff, a professor of economics at Boston University. The two scholars called for the following changes to the American government's fiscal and income security policies:

- Replacing the personal income tax, corporate income tax, Federal Insurance Contributions Act tax (FICA), estate tax, and gift tax with a 33% Federal Retail Sales Tax (FRST), plus a monthly rebate, amounting to the amount of FRST that a household with similar demographics would pay if its income were at the poverty line, similar to the FairTax proposal.
- Replacing the old age benefits paid under Social Security with a Personal Security System, consisting of private retirement accounts for all citizens, plus a government benefit payable to those whose savings were insufficient to afford a minimum retirement income
- Replacing Medicare and Medicaid with a universal Medical Security System that would provide health insurance vouchers to all citizens, the value of which would be determined by one's health
- Cutting federal discretionary spending by 20%

In February 2010, during the Greek government-debt crisis, Ferguson appeared on the Glenn Beck Program predicting that if interest rates rose in the United States, it could experience a similar sovereign default and mass civil disorder to what was occurring in Greece. He also praised the Tea Party movement. Later in the year, he called for the Federal Reserve under chairman Ben Bernanke to end its second round of quantitative easing. In November 2012, Ferguson stated in a video with CNN that the U.S. has enough energy resources to move towards energy independence and could possibly enter a new economic golden age due to the related socio-economic growth—coming out of the post-world economic recession doldrums. Ferguson was an attendee of the 2012 Bilderberg Group meeting, where he was a speaker on economic policy. Ferguson was highly critical of the results of the 2016 European Union referendum, warning that "the economic consequences will be dire". Later, after backing the Remain campaign during the referendum, Ferguson changed his mind and came out in support of Britain's exit from the European Union.

==== Exchanges with Paul Krugman ====
In May 2009, Ferguson became involved in a public exchange of views with economist Paul Krugman arising out of a panel discussion hosted by PEN/New York Review on 30 April 2009, regarding the American economy. Ferguson contended that the Obama administration's policies are simultaneously Keynesian and monetarist in an "incoherent" mix, and specifically claimed that the government's issuance of a multitude of new bonds would cause an increase in interest rates. Krugman argued that Ferguson's view is "resurrecting 75-year old fallacies" and full of "basic errors". He also stated that Ferguson is a "poseur" who "hasn't bothered to understand the basics, relying on snide comments and surface cleverness to convey the impression of wisdom. It's all style, no comprehension of substance."

In 2012, Jonathan Portes, the director of the National Institute of Economic and Social Research, said that subsequent events had shown Ferguson to be wrong: "As we all know, since then both the US and UK have had deficits running at historically extremely high levels, and long-term interest rates at historic lows: as Krugman has repeatedly pointed out, the (IS-LM) textbook has been spot on." After Ferguson wrote a cover story for Newsweek arguing that Mitt Romney should be elected in the 2012 United States presidential election, Krugman wrote that there were multiple errors and misrepresentations in the story, concluding: "We're not talking about ideology or even economic analysis here—just a plain misrepresentation of the facts, with an august publication letting itself be used to misinform readers. [The New York Times] would require an abject correction if something like that slipped through. Will Newsweek?"

In an online rebuttal titled "Paul Krugman Is Wrong", Ferguson defended his prior cover story, insisting that it was Krugman who had been wrong on the facts. Matthew O'Brien countered that Ferguson was still distorting the meaning of the Congressional Budget Office report being discussed, and that the entire piece could be read as an effort to deceive. In 2013, Ferguson, naming Dean Baker, Josh Barro, Brad DeLong, Matthew O'Brien, Noah Smith, Matthew Yglesias, and Justin Wolfers, attacked "Krugman and his acolytes" in a three-part essay explaining his dislike of Krugman. The essay title, "Krugtron the Invincible", originally comes from a post by Smith.

==== Remarks on Keynes' sexual orientation ====
At a May 2013 investment conference in Carlsbad, California, Ferguson was asked about his views on economist John Maynard Keynes' quotation that "in the long run we are all dead". Ferguson stated that Keynes was indifferent to the future because he was gay and did not have children. The remarks were widely criticised for being offensive, factually inaccurate, and a distortion of Keynes' ideas. Ferguson posted an apology for these statements shortly after reports of his words were widely disseminated, saying his comments were "as stupid as they were insensitive". In the apology, Ferguson stated: "My disagreements with Keynes's economic philosophy have never had anything to do with his sexual orientation. It is simply false to suggest, as I did, that his approach to economic policy was inspired by any aspect of his personal life."

==== Stanford Cardinal Conversations ====
In spring 2018, Ferguson was involved with College Republican leaders at Stanford to oppose a left-leaning student take over of the Cardinal Conversations initiative. In leaked emails, he was quoted as asking for opposition research on the student involved. He later apologized and resigned from the said initiative when emails were leaked revealing his involvement in the events. In a statement to The Stanford Daily, Ferguson wrote: "I very much regret the publication of these emails. I also regret having written them."

=== Cryptocurrency ===
Ferguson was an early skeptic of cryptocurrencies, famously dismissing his teenage son's recommendation to buy Bitcoin in 2014. By 2017, he had changed his mind on Bitcoin's utility, saying it had established itself as a form of "digital gold: a store of value for wealthy investors, especially those located in countries with weak rule of law and high political risk". In February 2019, Ferguson became an advisor for digital asset protocol firm Ampleforth Protocol, saying he was attracted by the firm's plan to "reinvent money in a way that protects individual freedom and to create a payments system that treats everyone equally". In March 2019, Ferguson spoke at an Australian Financial Review Business Summit, where he admitted to being "wrong to think there was no ... use for a form of currency based on blockchain technology... I don't think this will turn out to be a complete delusion."

=== Scottish nationalism and the British Union ===
Ferguson has stated that he identified as a Scottish nationalist as a teenager but moderated his views after moving to England to study history. He has argued that Scottish nationalism is sometimes fueled by a distorted view that Scots have always been oppressed by the English and is misconceived by people from outside of the United Kingdom as the choice between being Scottish or English. Ferguson states that in contrast to the subjugations of Wales and Ireland, Scotland was united as an "equal" country to England during the Act of Union of 1707, and cites events such as King James VI of Scotland inheriting the English crown, the failed Darien scheme to colonize Panama, which prompted Scottish political elites to support the Union, and the fact that Scots were an integral part of the East India Company to question the narrative that Scotland was oppressed. Ferguson has also argued (citing Walter Scott's novel Waverley) that Scotland after the Jacobite rebellion remained a land divided by warring clans and religious factions, and that the Union helped to quell some of the conflicts.

During the 2014 Scottish independence referendum, Ferguson supported Scotland remaining within the United Kingdom, citing potential economic consequences of Scottish independence, but argued that the opposition campaign needed to focus on Scotland's history of cosmopolitanism as well as economic points to save the Union. In 2021, ahead of the 2021 Scottish Parliament election, Ferguson argued that the Labour Party administration under Tony Blair had made a mistake in believing devolution would stem Scottish nationalism but instead enabled the Scottish National Party (SNP) to assume regional power and criticised the SNP government of Nicola Sturgeon for its management of the Scottish economy, education and freedom of speech. Ferguson furthermore states that the best way for the British government to thwart independence and the SNP's separationist demands was not by "unthinkingly accepting the SNP's argument that it has a moral right to a referendum on secession every time it wins a parliamentary election" and allowing a slim majority vote in favour to decide the outcome but instead by following the example of Canadian prime minister Jean Chretien and minister Stephane Dion's who handled the Parti Quebecois's calls for Quebec secessionism by taking the matter to the Canadian Supreme Court and introducing the Clarity Act rather than letting it solely be up to "a slim majority of the voters of Quebec if Canada broke up".

=== European Union ===
In 2011, Ferguson predicted that Grexit (the notion of Greece leaving the euro currency) was unlikely to happen but that Britain would leave the European Union (EU) in the near future as it would be easier for Britain to leave the EU owing to the fact it was not part of the eurozone and that returning to a national currency would be harder for countries who had signed up to a single currency. In 2012, he described the Eurozone as a "disaster waiting to happen".

During the 2016 United Kingdom European Union membership referendum, Ferguson was initially critical of the idea of Britain leaving the EU despite his criticisms of the latter, warning that "the economic consequences will be dire", and endorsed a Remain vote. After backing the Remain campaign (Britain Stronger in Europe), Ferguson changed his stance and came out in support of Brexit, admitting that his support to stay in had been motivated in part on a personal level by not wanting the government of David Cameron (with whom he had a friendship) to collapse and in turn risk Jeremy Corbyn becoming prime minister. Ferguson elaborated that while Brexit would still have some economic consequences, the EU had been a "disaster" on its monetary, immigration, national security, and radical Islam policies. He also added that "one has to recognise that the European elite's performances over the last decade entirely justified the revolt of provincial England".

In 2020, Ferguson predicted that the EU was destined to become "moribund" and was at risk of collapse in the near future and that the single currency had only benefited Northern Europe and Germany in particular while causing economic havoc in Southern Europe. He also argued the "real disintegration of Europe" will happen over the EU's migration policies that he says have both exacerbated and failed to provide solutions to illegal immigration to the European continent from North Africa and the Middle East. Ferguson stated that high levels of illegal immigration from Muslim-majority nations would in turn further the rise of populist and Eurosceptic movements committed to rolling back or leaving the EU. Ferguson also predicted that in a decade's time Britain would question why there had been fuss, outcry, or debates over the manner of how to leave the EU over Brexit because "we'll have left something that was essentially disintegrating", and that "it would be a little bit like getting a divorce and then your ex drops dead, and you spent all that money on the divorce courts, if only you'd known how sick the ex was. The European Union is sick, and people don't really want to admit that, least of all in Brussels." When commenting on the ethnic diversity of the candidates for the July–September 2022 Conservative Party leadership election, Ferguson disputed that racism or nostalgia for the British Empire had played a significant role in the vote for Brexit.

=== COVID-19 pandemic ===
Ferguson, drawing on his research of the 1881–1896 cholera pandemic and the Spanish flu, began predicting that the COVID-19 pandemic would have a severe impact on the world in January 2020. He later criticized both the British and U.S. federal government responses to the COVID-19 pandemic as inadequate, calling them "both, in their different ways, intelligible only as colossal failures by governments to make adequate preparations for a disaster they always knew to be a likely contingency". He also dismissed the idea that right-wing populism had been responsible for failure of government responses to the pandemic, accusing liberal politicians such as the then Belgian prime minister Sophie Wilmès and United States president Joe Biden of making similar mistakes to Donald Trump and Boris Johnson.

In April 2020, he published an op-ed alleging that Chinese authorities deliberately allowed international flights to continue departing Wuhan after the city was placed under quarantine. The claim was subsequently cited by several public figures, including Donald Trump. This allegation was later retracted.

He reflected in a 2021 podcast interview with Lex Fridman that many of the failures in the United States had been systemic rather than the personal fault of Trump, and that Trump was unfairly blamed because of the Trump administration's messaging. He alleged that Barack Obama's handling of the U.S. opioid epidemic had been similarly costly but more obscure. Ferguson also praised Operation Warp Speed, and argued that part of the reason for the failure of the U.S. government to effectively respond to the pandemic was the absence of a similar program for COVID-19 testing.

=== 2022 Russian invasion of Ukraine ===
On 22 March 2022, around a month after the Russian invasion of Ukraine, Ferguson wrote: "I conclude that the U.S. intends to keep this war going. The administration will continue to supply the Ukrainians with anti-aircraft Stingers, antitank Javelins and explosive Switchblade drones. ... It helps explain, among other things, the lack of any diplomatic effort by the U.S. to secure a cease-fire. ... Prolonging the war runs the risk not just of leaving tens of thousands of Ukrainians dead and millions homeless, but also of handing Putin something that he can plausibly present at home as victory." He also criticized the 2022 Moscow rally for justifying the invasion and described it as "fascistic".

=== Israel–Palestinian conflict ===
In wake of the 2023 Hamas-led attack on Israel, Ferguson said, "I think it is clear that Israel can no longer co-exist with Hamas in control of Gaza. If anybody doubted that, then surely those doubts were dispelled on October the 7th with the most hideous scenes of violence against Jews since the Holocaust". He added that "The issue is can Hamas be destroyed, as it should be, at an acceptable cost". Ferguson has also sharply criticized the accusations of genocide in Gaza, describing such claims as "utterly divorced from strategic reality".

Ferguson rejects plans to recognize a Palestinian state insisting that "nothing remotely resembling a Palestinian state exists today. Nor is one likely to exist at any point in the foreseeable future." He argues that the Palestinian Authority is widely despised and lacks real authority, while Hamas continues to command significant support, even in the West Bank, and remains fundamentally committed to violence. In Ferguson's view, the October 7 attacks should be seen as a decisive moral and political failure: "an event disqualifying the Palestinians from self-government, not entitling them to it." He adds that the enduring support for Hamas among Palestinians, and claims due to supposed widespread denial of the October 7 attacks, erodes any claim to statehood.

== Personal life ==
Ferguson met journalist Sue Douglas in 1987, when she was his editor at The Sunday Times. They married in 1994, and went on to have three children. In February 2010, Ferguson separated from Douglas and thereafter started dating Ayaan Hirsi Ali. Ferguson and Douglas divorced in 2011. Ferguson married Hirsi Ali on 10 September 2011; she gave birth to their son three months later. Upset about the media coverage of his relationship with Hirsi Ali, which implied that he had begun dating her before his first marriage had unraveled, Ferguson stated: "I don't care about the sex lives of celebrities, so I was a little unprepared for having my private life all over the country."

Ferguson dedicated his book Civilization to "Ayaan". In an interview with The Guardian, Ferguson spoke about his love for Ali who, he writes in the preface, "understands better than anyone I know what Western civilisation really means – and what it still has to offer the world". The couple have two sons. In a 2024 interview with Greg Sheridan, Ferguson said that he, Hirsi Ali, and their two sons were baptised in September 2023.

Ferguson's self-confessed workaholism has placed strains on his personal relations in the past. In 2011, Ferguson commented:

[F]rom 2002, the combination of making TV programmes and teaching at Harvard took me away from my children too much. You don't get those years back. You have to ask yourself: "Was it a smart decision to do those things?" I think the success I have enjoyed since then has been bought at a significant price. In hindsight, there would have been a bunch of things that I would have said no to.

Ferguson was the inspiration for Alan Bennett's play The History Boys (2004), particularly the character of Irwin, a history teacher who urges his pupils to find a counterintuitive angle, and who then goes on to become a television historian. Irwin, writes David Smith of The Observer, gives the impression that "an entire career can be built on the trick of contrariness".

In 2018, Ferguson became naturalised as a United States citizen. He was elected an Honorary Fellow of the Royal Society of Edinburgh (HonFRSE) in the disciplines of language, literature and history in 2020. In the 2024 Birthday Honours, Ferguson was awarded a knighthood by King Charles III for services to literature.

A former atheist, Ferguson is a Christian.

== Selected bibliography ==
- Ferguson, Niall (1995). Paper and Iron: Hamburg Business and German Politics in the Era of Inflation, 1897–1927. Cambridge: Cambridge University Press. ISBN 0-521-47016-1.
- — (1999). The House of Rothschild: The World's Banker, 1849–1999. New York: Viking Press. ISBN 0-670-88794-3.
  - — (1998). The World's Banker: The History of the House of Rothschild. London: Weidenfeld & Nicolson. ISBN 0-297-81539-3.
  - — (1998). The House of Rothschild. New York: Viking. ISBN 0-670-85768-8.
- — (1999) [1998]. The Pity of War. New York: Basic Books. ISBN 0-465-05711-X. OCLC 41124439.
- — (1999) [1997]. Virtual History: Alternatives and Counterfactuals. New York: Basic Books. ISBN 0-465-02322-3.
- — (2001). The Cash Nexus: Money and Power in the Modern World, 1700–2000. London: Allen Lane. ISBN 0-7139-9465-7. OCLC 46459770.
- — (2003). Empire: How Britain Made the Modern World. London: Allen Lane. ISBN 0-7139-9615-3.
  - — (2003). Empire: The Rise and Demise of the British World Order and the Lessons for Global Power. New York: Basic Books. ISBN 0-465-02328-2. American edition.
- — (2004). Colossus: The Rise and Fall of the American Empire. Gardners Books. ISBN 0-7139-9770-2.
- — (2005). 1914. Pocket Penguins 70s S. London, England: Penguin Books. ISBN 0-14-102220-5.
- — (2006). The War of the World: History's Age of Hatred. London: Allen Lane. ISBN 0-7139-9708-7. American ed. has the title: The War of the World: Twentieth-century Conflict and the Descent of the West. OCLC 70839824 (also a Channel 4 series)
- — (2008). The Ascent of Money: A Financial History of the World. London: Allen Lane. ISBN 978-1-84614-106-5.
- — (2010). High Financier: The Lives and Times of Siegmund Warburg. New York: Penguin. ISBN 978-1-59420-246-9.
- — (2011). Civilization: The West and the Rest. The Penguin Press HC. ISBN 978-1-59420-305-3.
- — (2013). The Great Degeneration. Penguin Books.
- — (2015). Kissinger: 1923–1968: The Idealist. New York: Penguin Press. ISBN 978-1-59420-653-5.
- — (2017). The Square and the Tower: Networks, Hierarchies and the Struggle for Global Power. London: Allen Lane. ISBN 978-024129-046-0.
- — (2021). Doom: The Politics of Catastrophe. London: Allen Lane. ISBN 978-0-24148844-7.

== See also ==
- Anglosphere
