= The Day (website) =

News website for children

- Type: Children's daily online newspaper
- Founder: Richard Addis
- Founded: 2011
- Language: English
- Country: United Kingdom
- Website: https://theday.co.uk

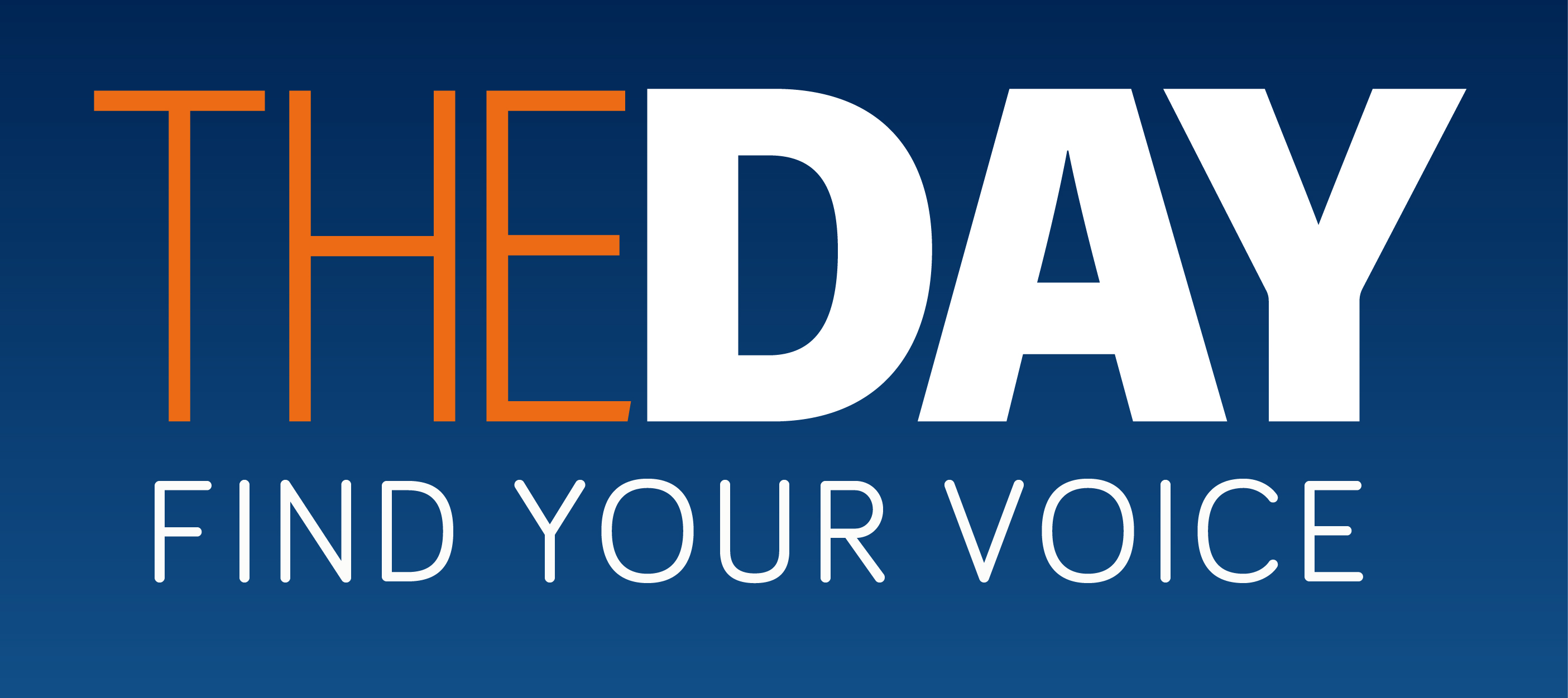

The Day is a British online children's educational newspaper founded in 2011. The publication targets children in primary and Secondary education.

It has a paying readership of 900 schools using digital subscriptions to teach nearly 1m students per day—the largest audience of any news brand in the UK in its age group. Its content was endorsed by the UK’s Department for Education during the Covid epidemic. It is independent of all media groups and writes all its own content.

The website was founded in 2011 by the British journalist Richard Addis. The Day's board of directors is chaired by Victoria Crumby, and includes Julian Turner, Fred Maroudas & Nicholas Ward.

The first story was published on 6 January 2011, titled "Terrible floods in Australia bring ruin and snakes".

In 2015, The Day launched its sister publication, News Detectives, (formerly The Day Explorer) a daily mini-newspaper for primary school students. The first story was published on 13 April, titled "Cornish people declared a national minority".

The Day partners with the LEGO Group on Build the Change Tuesdays, getting students to come up with creative solutions to the sustainability challenges affecting our planet.

It also partners with the University of Oxford on a major response to the growing youth mental health crisis, BrainWaves.

In July 2020, the website apologised and paid an undisclosed amount to author JK Rowling for an article that implied that she was transphobic and should be boycotted.

In 2021, The Day became a business signatory on the National Literacy Trust's "Vision for Literacy" pledge.
