= Paul Callan =

British journalist and editor (1939–2020)

- Born: Paul Stanley Lester Callan; 13 March 1939; Redbridge, Essex, England
- Died: 22 November 2020 (aged 81)
- Education: Cranbrook School; Royal Academy of Music
- Occupation: Journalist
- Spouse: Steffi Fields (m. 1973)

Paul Stanley Lester Callan (13 March 1939 – 22 November 2020) was a British journalist and editor. He was known for his flamboyant manner and distinctive attire.

== Early life ==
Callan was born on 13 March 1939 in Redbridge in Essex to an Irish musician father and a Jewish mother. He attended the independent Cranbrook School in Ilford, then enrolled at the Royal Academy of Music, seeing prospects of a career as a cellist.

== Early career ==
Callan reached prominence as editor of the Londoner's Diary in the Evening Standard in the 1960s, and then with a Daily Mail diary column. He achieved a succession of scoops, and was responsible for training up a generation of young journalists, including the gossip columnist, Nigel Dempster.

Callan later moved to the Daily Mirror where he wrote the "Inside World of Paul Callan" column which broke a number of major stories embarrassing to their subjects.

== Celebrity interviews ==
Tiring of the gossip columns, Callan moved over to the celebrity interview. Callan's amiability and nose for a story made him a favourite of actors and publishers alike, and he interviewed virtually every major Hollywood star in the last forty years, and members of the British royal family.

He is credited with the shortest interview ever published. Meeting the reclusive Greta Garbo at the Hotel du Cap Eden Roc near Cannes, Callan got as far as, "I wonder..." before Garbo cut in with, "Why wonder?", and stormed off. The story ran across a full page in the Daily Mail.

== Radio ==
Callan and broadcaster Janet Street-Porter are credited with inventing a new form of radio, albeit unintentionally. At the launch in 1973 of the London Broadcasting Company, or LBC, the pair were pitched as co-presenters of the breakfast show. The intention was to contrast the urbane Callan with the less couth Street-Porter, whose accents were respectively known to studio engineers as "cut-glass" and "cut-froat".

In the event friction between the two colleagues led to an entertaining stream of one-upmanship that became required listening for many Londoners. The programme was the first in the UK to combine interviews with celebrities and heavyweight political figures on the same show, blurring the line between classic British comedy and analysis of international affairs.

== Innovation ==
In parallel with David Frost's approach to television, Callan developed a technique known as "news colour" in which a hard news story is reported in a feature style. It has the effect of placing the reader as if he is actually witnessing the story, and is now taught in journalism school.

As one of the last representatives of old Fleet Street he cut an unmistakable figure, clad in pinstriped suit and trademark spotted bow tie regardless of geography or climate. In 1991, he moved to the Daily Express where he combined feature writing with news colour as well as contributing regularly to the comment pages. Callan was a contributor to the What the Papers Say television programme.

Callan was known for his acerbic book reviews despite being described by the critic Clive James as "having the literary sensibilities of a vampire bat".

== Personal life and death ==
Callan married New York journalist Steffi Fields in 1973, who moved over from being London correspondent of the fashion bible Women's Wear Daily to the position of news editor of the London bureau of the NBC television network. His daughter, Jessica, worked on the Daily Mirror's 3am column.

Callan died on 22 November 2020, due to a fall, at the age of 81. In an obituary in The Daily Telegraph, he was recounted as a "fount of juicy stories". Piers Morgan, the former editor of the Daily Mirror, paid tribute to him as "one of the greatest characters in Fleet Street history".
