= Adrian Woodhouse =

British writer, journalist and collector (born 1951)

Adrian Woodhouse (born 27 July 1951) is a British writer, journalist and collector. Born in Calcutta, India he moved with his family back to their native country in the mid-1960s. After reading history at King's College, Cambridge, he started work as a financial journalist before moving into gossip which better suited his talent since childhood for "collecting" famous people. In 1978 he became editor of Londoner's Diary in the Evening Standard for four years and in the following decade worked successively for Tatler, The Daily Telegraph and Robert Maxwell's short-lived London Daily News.

Through his more conventional collecting he curated from 1978 pioneering exhibitions of his favourite subjects - ceramics designer Susie Cooper, graphic artist Beresford Egan and surrealist photographer Angus McBean - and published full-length biographies of all three. With McBean he also wrote Vivien: A Love Affair in Camera about Vivien Leigh.

From the 1990s garden and architectural history have been his staples in Country Life and other magazines. He was initiator of the Capability Brown birthplace museum at Kirkharle, Northumberland in 2000 and is acknowledged champion of the reputation of the 17th century architect and designer John Smythson.

== Bibliography ==
- Vivien Leigh: A Love Affair In Camera. London: Phaidon, 1989. (with Angus McBean.)
- Susie Cooper. Trilby Books, 1992.
- Beresford Egan. North Yorkshire:, Tartarus Press, 2005.
- Angus McBean: Facemaker. London: Alma, 2006.
- Shakespeare by McBean. Manchester. Manchester University Press, 2018
