= Charlotte Edwardes =

Journalist

Charlotte Edwardes is an English newspaper journalist. She has worked at The Spectator, The Telegraph, the Evening Standard, The Times, and The Guardian, where she has been an interviewer since 2023. She has won interviewer of the year at multiple press awards.

== Education ==
Edwardes wrote her postgraduate thesis on Hezbollah. She has an MFA in creative writing from New York University. She is studying for a PhD at the University of East Anglia.

== Career ==
Edwardes spent a decade as a reporter at The Telegraph. In December 2001, she interviewed Osama bin Laden's half-brother Abdullah. In 2004, Edwardes wrote a piece for the newspaper that said that, based on a script before the film was made, Ridley Scott's Kingdom of Heaven "panders to Osama Bin Laden". Critic Hamid Dabashi described this response to a then-unmade film as "Very strange, indeed". In 2005, Edwardes and her Sunday Telegraph colleague Daniel Foggo were finalists for the Outstanding Investigative Reporting Prize at the ICIJ awards for their reporting on illegal abortion. They were also runners-up for the Private Eye/Guardian Paul Foot Award the same year.

She was a feature writer and chief interviewer at the Evening Standard from 2012, for which she won the 2016 and 2017 Press Award for Interviewer of the Year (Pop). She was diary editor of The Londoner for The Evening Standard for over a year before being replaced by Ayesha Hazarika in July 2019, remaining as senior feature writer and columnist.

While at the Evening Standard, she also freelanced for The Times and Tatler. In May 2016, when interviewing cricketer Chris Gayle for The Times, he made what were reported as lewd and sexist comments.

Soon after leaving the Standard, she joined The Sunday Times as an assistant editor and columnist for its Style magazine, in September 2019. At The Times and Sunday Times, Edwardes was a features writer, interviewer, and columnist for over three years. That same month, Edwardes accused the then-Conservative Prime Minister Boris Johnson in her Sunday Times column of groping her thigh and that of another woman at a lunch in 1999 when she worked for him at The Spectator, which he denied. She was supported by Conservative MPs Matt Hancock and Amber Rudd. In 2020, Edwardes was highly commended at the Press Awards for her political interviews. In 2021, she was shortlisted as Interviewer of the Year at the British Journalism Awards for her Times interviews with Robert Webb, Joey Essex, and Kit Harington.

She joined The Guardian's Saturday magazine as an interviewer in January 2023. In 2025, Edwardes was highly commended at the 2024 Press Awards for her in-depth interviews, including with Keir Starmer, Gary Lineker, and Jeremy Clarkson. She was shortlisted as Interviewer of the Year - Broadsheet at the 2025 Press Awards for her Guardian interviews with David Lammy, Kieran Culkin, and Chimamanda Ngozi Adichie.

Her debut novel Trouble Was was published in July 2026 by Bloomsbury.

== Personal life ==
Edwardes has three children - two daughters and a son.

Her partner since 2017 was broadcast journalist Robert Peston, with whom she worked at The Telegraph in 2003 and met again at a Christmas party. They split up in 2026.
