= Sue Douglas =

British journalist and media executive (born 1957)

- Born: Susan Margaret Douglas; 29 January 1957 (age 69); London, England
- Education: University of Southampton
- Spouse: Niall Ferguson (m. 1994; div. 2011)
- Children: 3

Susan Margaret Douglas (born 29 January 1957) is a British media executive and former newspaper editor.

== Early life ==
Born in London, she was educated at Tiffin Girls' School in Kingston. After graduating with a first-class honours degree in physiology and biochemistry from Southampton University, she began her career in 1978 with management consultants Andersen Consulting. She then became a medical journalist with Haymarket Publishing. In South Africa (1979–81) she worked for the South African Sunday Express and The Rand Daily Mail.

== Career ==
Returning to Britain in 1981, she began writing for the Daily Mail and News of the World, and in 1982 she joined the Mail on Sunday. Initially a medical correspondent, she was promoted to associate editor of the newspaper, then assistant editor of the Daily Mail in 1987. Joining The Sunday Times in 1991, she became deputy editor. Douglas launched the newspaper's Style & Culture sections, relaunched The Sunday Times magazine, ran the Insight investigative team and introduced many writers and columnists including Julie Burchill, Jeremy Clarkson, Taki, Melvyn Bragg and her then-husband, historian Niall Ferguson.

At the beginning of 1996, she took up her appointment as editor of the Sunday Express, then owned by Lord Stevens. Just under two years later, Clive Hollick bought the Express group and rolled the Sunday into the Daily title, rendering all Sunday Express journalists redundant.

Douglas was chosen by former Sunday Times superior Andrew Neil to assist in relaunching The Scotsman, Scotland on Sunday and the Edinburgh Evening News. At the same time, she diversified into magazine publishing, working on the US launch of men's magazine Gear, then the UK websites Vogue.com, Traveller.co.uk and after she helped launch the new title, Glamour, in the UK, she ran the contract publishing division of Condé Nast, with titles such as tate, Trader, Mandarin Oriental, Harrods and the Post office magazine. Glamour was one of the most successful magazine launches ever, and Douglas, as President of New Business with Condé Nast, became a director.

== Later career ==
After recovering from a severe horse-riding accident which led to a brain haemorrhage, she became a freelance executive. In 2008, she joined literary agency PFD as a director, and engineered the management buyout by Andrew Neil. The acquisition ultimately led to Douglas being forced to leave. Consultancy deals with HarperCollins, Future publishing and television company, Luxe.tv and Lingospot followed.

Douglas, as part of a consortium, was reported in January 2013 to have been in talks with Trinity Mirror to purchase a majority stake in the Sunday People and rebrand it as The News of the People (Douglas had attempted to buy the News of the World after its closure). In May 2013, these plans were reported to have been dropped, although Phoenix Ventures, her company, remained in talks about other collaborations.

Early in the following month it emerged that she was to head a wholly owned subsidiary of Trinity Mirror called Sunday Brands. The leading publication would be the Sunday People, with other titles from the group, but these would not include the Sunday Mirror. The Sunday Brands was soon dropped, with Douglas' role changing to offering a digital version of the Sunday People. In the end, the new website, launched in November 2013, did not meet Trinity Mirror's financial targets and closed in January 2014 when Douglas left the company.

== Personal life ==
Douglas married historian Niall Ferguson in 1994. They separated in 2010, and divorced in 2011. They have three children together.

Media offices
Preceded by Ivan Fallon	Deputy Editor of the Sunday Times; 1995	Succeeded by Martin Ivens
Preceded by Brian Hitchen	Editor of the Sunday Express; 1995–1996	Succeeded by Richard Addis
