= Richard Addis =

British journalist and entrepreneur

Richard Addis (born 23 August 1956) is a British journalist and entrepreneur. He is a former editor of the Daily Express newspaper, a former novice Anglican monk and founder and former Editor-in-Chief of The Day.

Addis was educated at West Downs School, Rugby School and Downing College, Cambridge, graduating with a BA and an MA. Between attending Rugby and Downing he spent two years as a novice at the Anglican priory of the Community of the Glorious Ascension in Watchet, Somerset.

His started in journalism as deputy editor of Homes & Jobs magazine where he was rapidly promoted to editor and, to save money, wrote the entire magazine under various pseudonyms. It was there where he first demonstrated his flair for design when his insisted that his staff should all wear a different colour each day and sit next to each other so their clothes and the editorial floor were colour-coordinated. When the title went bankrupt he got a job as a reporter on Marketing Week where he remained for two years. His career took off when he was hired as a reporter on Londoner's Diary of the London Evening Standard in 1985. He went on to become Editor of Londoner's Diary and Assistant Editor (Features).

In 1989 he was appointed Deputy Editor of The Sunday Telegraph. In 1991 he was appointed features editor at the Daily Mail where his downhome and informal style of dress was admired and often imitated. In 1995, he was appointed editor of the Daily Express and a year later became editor-in-chief of the Daily and Sunday Express. While on the Express he regularly invited the paper's astrologer Jonathan Cainer to join editorial conferences to give them an added perspective. He left the Express in 1999 to move to Canada as editor of The Globe and Mail in Toronto, a post he held from July 1999 – July 2002. In 2002 he returned to London as Assistant Editor in charge of design at the Financial Times. He was promoted to Editor of Weekend FT shortly afterwards while retaining his design duties, remaining there until 2006.

Overall he has taken his turn at editing seven ‘national’ newspapers (Evening Standard, Sunday Telegraph, Daily Mail, Daily Express, Sunday Express, The Globe and Mail and Financial Times) which is believed to be a record among living British journalists.

Richard Addis left newspapers in February 2006 to launch his own media consultancy, Shakeup Media, working with publishers in Africa, the Middle East and India. For five years he attempted to launch various media start-ups including the UK's first hand-written newspaper (The Manual) and the UK's first quality free daily newspaper (The Day) which received investment support from backers including Associated Newspapers before running into the credit crunch of 2008. He wrote an award-winning book about the ethics of the global economic system (Good Value, Penguin, 2009) with Stephen Green.

In January 2011 he finally launched The Day in a new incarnation as a daily online news title for "schools, colleges and inquiring minds". Claiming to be the "world's first current affairs teaching and learning website", 18 months after launch The Day had subscribers in 21 countries and a daily reach of over half a million teenagers. Richard left The Day in May 2025.

From March 2014 to July 2015 he worked with Newsweek to launch a fully independent European edition as its first European editor-in-chief.

Richard Addis is single and lives in London. For 20 years he was the partner of the British actress Helen Schlesinger with whom he has two children, Theo and Sebastian. He was previously married for 20 years to the artist and translator Noonie Minogue with whom he has three children, Ferdie, Beatrice and Katharine.

Media offices
Preceded by Ian Watson	Deputy Editor of the Sunday Telegraph; 1989–1991	Succeeded by ?
Preceded by Sir Nicholas Lloyd	Editor of the Daily Express; 1995–1998	Succeeded by Rosie Boycott
Preceded by Sue Douglas	Editor of the Sunday Express; 1995–1998	Succeeded by Amanda Platell
Preceded by William Thorsell	Editor of The Globe and Mail; 1999–2002	Succeeded by Edward Greenspon
