= Civilization: Is the West History? =

- Also known as: Civilization: The West and the Rest
- Genre: Documentary
- Presented by: Niall Ferguson
- Country of origin: United Kingdom
- No. of seasons: 1
- No. of episodes: 6

Original release
- Network: Channel 4
- Release: 6 March – 10 April 2011

Civilization: Is the West History? is a 2011 British TV documentary that tells how Western civilisation, in five centuries, transformed into the dominating civilisation in the world.

Presented by Niall Ferguson, the show reveals the 'killer apps' of the West's success – competition, science, the property owning democracy, modern medicine, the consumer society and the Protestant work ethic – the real explanation of how, for five centuries, a clear minority of mankind managed to secure the majority of the Earth's resources.

== Description ==
According to the historian, the rise of Western civilization over the past five centuries is a significant historical development. Globally, many institutions and practices—including universities, corporations, governments, medicine, clothing, and sports—reflect Western influences. Six hundred years ago, Western European kingdoms were affected by war and disease, while Ming China and the Ottoman Empire were major civilizations. The text addresses how Western powers expanded relative to Eastern rivals and whether Western influence has declined.

In Civilization: Is the West history?, the British historian Niall Ferguson argues that, beginning in the fifteenth century, the West developed six powerful new concepts that the Rest lacked: competition, science, the rule of law, modern medicine, consumerism, and the work ethic. These became the "killer apps" that allowed the West to go ahead of the Rest; opening global trade routes, exploiting new scientific knowledge, evolving representative government, increasing life expectancy, unleashing the Industrial Revolution, and hugely increasing human productivity. Civilization shows exactly how a dozen Western empires came to control three-fifths of mankind and four-fifths of the world economy.

However, Ferguson argues that the days of Western predominance are numbered because the Rest have finally downloaded the six killer apps the West once monopolised – while the West has literally lost faith in itself.

== Episodes ==
No.	Title	Original release date
1	"Competition"	6 March 2011
The first episode begins in 1420 when Ming China had a credible claim to be the most advanced civilization in the world: 'All Under Heaven'. England on the eve of the Wars of the Roses would have seemed quite primitive by contrast. Yet the lead that China had established in technology was not to be translated into sustained economic growth. In China, a monolithic empire stifled colonial expansion and economic innovation. In Europe political division bred competition. The question for our own time is whether or not we have lost that competitive edge to a rapidly ascending Asia.
2	"Science"	13 March 2011
In 1683, the Ottoman army laid siege to Vienna, the capital of Europe's most powerful empire. Domination of West by East was an alarmingly plausible scenario. But the Ottoman army was defeated; not so much by firepower as by science. Ferguson asks why the Islamic world did not participate in the Scientific Revolution and the Enlightenment, and if the West is still capable of maintaining its scientific lead at a time when educational attainment in science subjects is declining.
3	"Property"	20 March 2011
Ferguson asks why North America succeeded while Latin America for so many centuries lagged behind. The two had much in common (not least the subjugation of indigenous peoples and the use of slavery by European immigrants), but they differed profoundly on individual property rights, the rule of law and representative government. There were two revolutions against royal rule between 1776 and 1820, yet Simón Bolívar was never able to be George Washington, and Latin America remained politically fragmented, socially divided and economically backward even as the United States rose to global primacy. However, Niall Ferguson asks whether North and South are converging today, linguistically and economically.
4	"Medicine"	27 March 2011
The French Empire consciously set out to civilize Africa by improving public health as well as building a modern infrastructure. . What was the link from medical science to racial pseudo-science? The imperialists talked of their civilizing mission, but their rivalry ultimately caused world wars that endangered the West's global dominance. Today, have Western aid agencies learned lessons from the past? Or is China in the process of building a new African empire?
5	"Consumerism"	3 April 2011
Today the world is becoming more homogenous and, with increasingly few exceptions, big-name brands dominate main streets, high streets and shopping malls all around the globe. We dress the same; we want the same latest technological kit; we drive the same cars. But where did this uniformity come from? The answer is the combination of the Industrial Revolution and the consumer society. Originating in the UK but flourishing most spectacularly in the United States, the advent of mass consumption has changed the way the world worked. Led by the Japanese, one non-Western society after another has adopted the same model, embracing the Western way of manufacturing and consuming. Only the Muslim world has resisted. But how long can the burkha hold out against Levi's? Niall Ferguson examines whether we are now seeing the first effective challenge to the global dominance of Western consumerism.
6	"Work"	10 April 2011
The sixth element that enabled the West to dominate the rest was the work ethic. Max Weber famously linked it to Protestantism, any culture, regardless of religion, is capable of embracing the spirit of capitalism by working hard, saving, and accumulating capital over time. The question is why that ethic seems now to be fading in the West. Europeans no longer work long hours, and Americans have almost given up saving completely. The real workers and savers in the world are now the heirs of Confucius, not Calvin. Yet these fears may underestimate the ability of Western civilization to solve the world's problems. In the final episode, Niall Ferguson argues that the real threat to our survival is our loss of faith not in religion but in ourselves.

== Reception ==
Brad Newsome of The Sydney Morning Herald wrote, "The provocative, pro-colonialist Ferguson won't be everyone's cup of tea but at least this series shows that the BBC does air a diversity of views." Tom Sutcliffe of The Independent wrote that Ferguson is "irritating in a very thought-provoking way". Sam Wollaston of The Guardian wrote, "Ferguson's is a no-nonsense approach: here's how it is, you better believe it. It's not especially charming, but it certainly isn't boring – it's a rollicking roller-coaster ride through time, so much fun it doesn't even feel like school." Chris Harvey of The Daily Telegraph wrote, "His developing thesis was an enjoyable one, driven forward with the certainty that is Ferguson's style."
