= Londoner's Diary =

Gossip column in the London Evening Standard

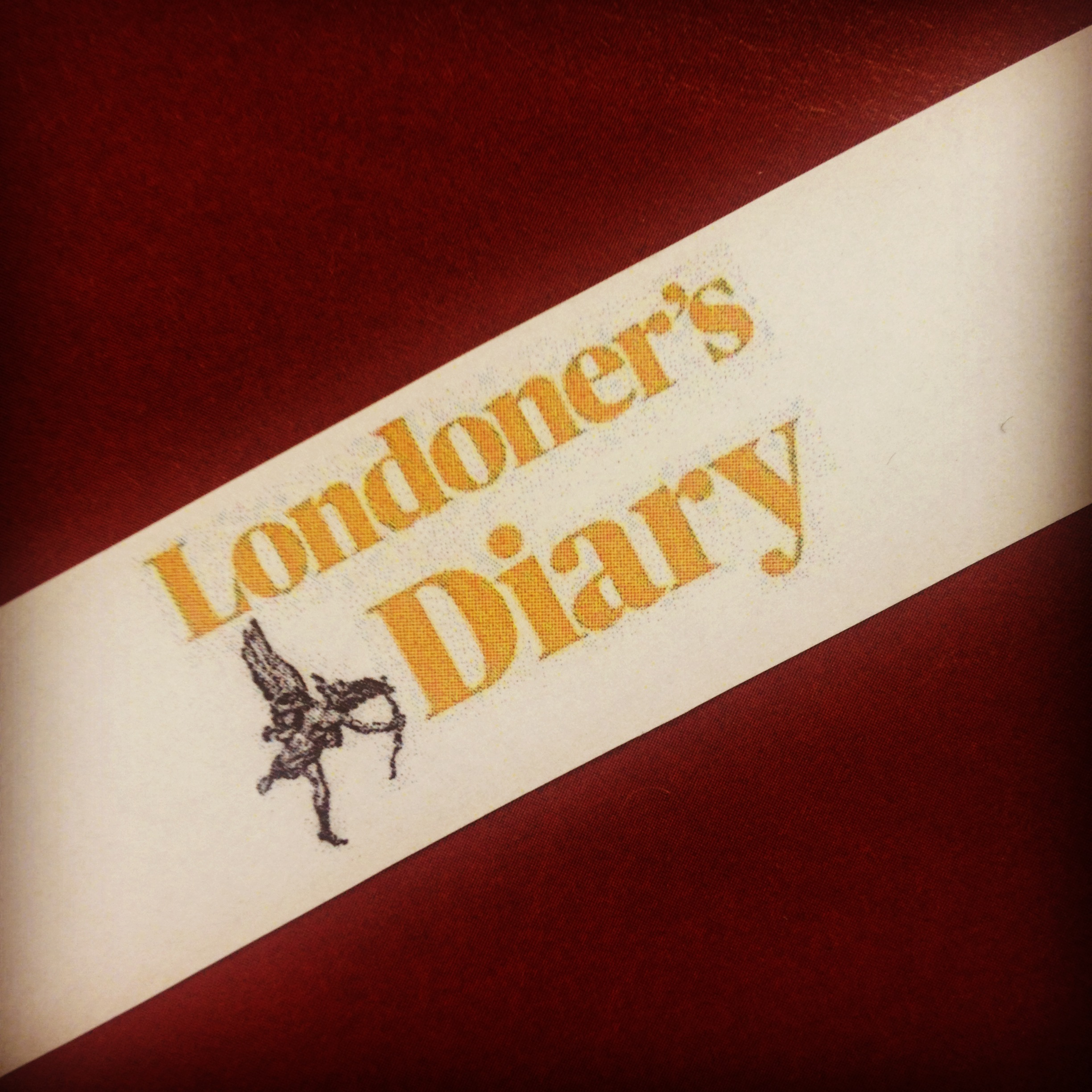
- Editor: Robbie Griffiths
- Categories: Society, politics, arts, fashion, theatre, gossip
- Frequency: Daily
- Circulation: 900,000
- Publisher: Evening Standard
- First issue: 11 April 1916
- Based in: London
- Website: Londoner's Diary

"Londoner's Diary" is a gossip column in the London Evening Standard. Since 1916 the column has provided readers with witty and mischievous insights into high society; from political scandals and literary feuds to the backstage gossip at fashion parties and film premieres. Charles Wintour, who edited the Standard throughout the sixties, once declared: "To go to a decent London dinner party without having read the Diary would be to go out unprepared for proper conversation."

== History ==
"Londoner's Diary" first appeared on 11 April 1916. Arthur Mann, the Standard's editor at the time, announced that it would consist of "three columns written daily by gentlemen for gentlemen" with a distinctive slant on politics, personalities and London based stories. The section was the first of its kind; as early as 1917 it was noted that "the best tribute to 'A Londoner's Diary' is the fact that it now has its counterpart in the other penny evening papers in London."

=== Lord Beaverbrook ===
In 1923, the Evening Standard was acquired by Lord Beaverbrook, the wildly influential Canadian press baron who was gleefully parodied as the ruthless Lord Monomark in Evelyn Waugh's Vile Bodies and Stephen Fry's film adaptation Bright Young Things.

With London still reeling from the horrors of the First World War, Beaverbrook was the first proprietor on Fleet Street to understand how eager his readers were to be entertained by glittering gossip.

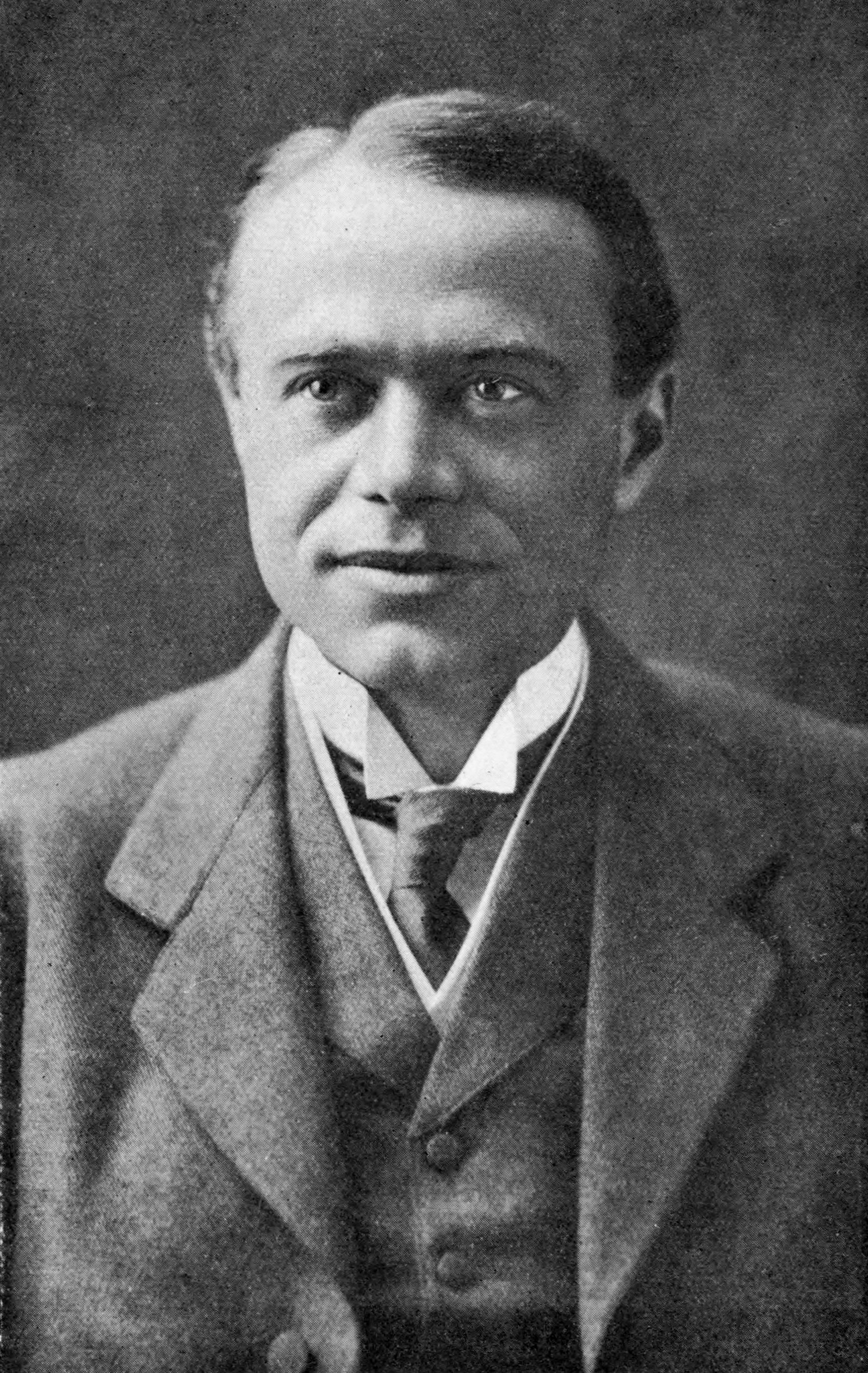
Press baron and Standard proprietor Lord Beaverbrook

However, he saw "Londoner's Diary" as more than just a means of profitably popularising the paper. Beaverbrook "regarded the nightly diary page in the Evening Standard as his own personal fiefdom … an armoury from which he could seize a weapon at will; bludgeon, cudgel and rapier lay at his disposal as he sought to fight his way to ever greater heights of power and influence in between-the-wars Britain."

The Diary provided a mischievous platform for political gossip and upper crust scandal, regaling readers with titbits on the private lives of London's high society: their excesses, their pets and their dinner-parties – but never their love affairs.

John Junor – who edited the Sunday Express, another of Beaverbrook's papers – once pithily summarised his proprietor's opinion of sex in gossip columns. "All fucking is private", he told a new reporter, "Always remember that."

=== Pre-War ===
An extraordinary number of cultural and literary figures sharpened their teeth on the pages of the Diary. Before the Second World War, contributors to the column included Harold Nicolson, John Betjeman, Randolph Churchill, Malcolm Muggeridge and Peter Fleming, brother of the 007 novelist Ian.

Gentlemen first and journalists second, not all of them had the makings of a good diarist. A young John Betjeman once came bursting into the editor's office in a state of great excitement. "Please, Sir, I think I've got one of those scoop things!" cried the future poet laureate. "Oh really", replied his editor, "and how do you know it's a scoop?" "Well, Sir, I've rung the Evening News and they haven't got it."

Other diarists were a little more serious about the task in hand and veteran Daily Mirror journalist Donald Zec recalled being in a certain amount of awe when dropping by the Diary as a rookie reporter. "They generally wore horn-rimmed spectacles, hairy tweed jackets and corduroys and called each other 'Old Boy' a lot" wrote Zec. "Just to hover in the room where they worked – or plotted – was instructive."

In 1928 the Diary's editor was Robert Bruce Lockhart, a former spy known for his hard-drinking and semi-debauched lifestyle, who would later become a best-selling author with his Memoirs of a British Agent (1932). Lockhart had been Britain's first spy in Moscow and, despite having been caught and exchanged for a Soviet agent, remained on unusually cordial terms with the Russian Embassy in London, from whom he received an annual gift of caviar.

=== Harold Nicolson ===
It was Lockhart who – having been promoted to a more wide-ranging role by Beaverbrook – suggested that his friend the aristocrat, ex-diplomat and writer Harold Nicolson might be the ideal man to take over the Diary.

To The Standard editors, the gregarious, urbane Nicolson seemed perfect for the position. He was a brilliant raconteur with a lively sense of irony and humour, who was very much at home in social London. A member of several of the capital’s best clubs, he loved attending the endless dinner parties and other social gatherings to which he was invited. Even when parties were dull, he still had fun. 'It is so odd. I enjoyed it,' he wrote in his diary after one such party. 'I always enjoy everything. That is dreadful. I must pull myself together and be bored for once.'

But the easy pleasure that Nicolson took in socialising for its own sake quickly evaporated when forced to attend festivities in search of stories. "Work fruitlessly, superficially, futilely upon the Londoner’s Diary" he wrote in his private journal. "The difficulty is that the only news I get is from friends and that is just the news that I can't publish."

Although the money was good, the aristocratic Nicolson disapproved of his shamelessly power-hungry proprietor and found Fleet Street "culturally degrading". His superior attitude did not go unnoticed. "Harold’s tastes are not the public's tastes", lamented Lockhart. "He is all too precious." Beaverbrook however, did not agree. In June 1931, the newspaper magnate offered Nicolson the editorship of the entire paper. Instead of accepting, Nicolson took the opportunity to jump ship and quit.

=== Randolph Churchill ===
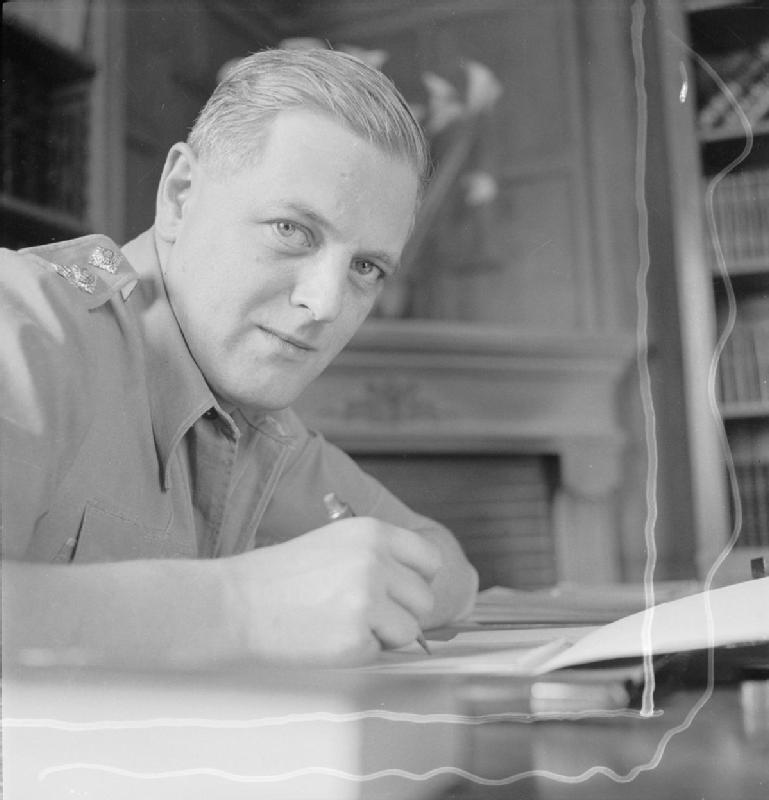
Diary editor Randolph Churchill, photographed by Cecil Beaton

Randolph Churchill, son of Winston, had an unusually checkered relationship with the gossip pages. Eager to be seen as one of London's glamorous 'Bright Young Things', in May 1932 he personally telephoned the Diary to provide them with advance details of his 21st birthday and its glittering society guest list. But he flew into a rage with Beaverbrook when another of the press baron's papers, the Daily Express, singled him out in a story on the sons of great men, which sneeringly observed that "major fathers as a rule breed minor sons, so our little London peacocks had better tone down their fine feathers." "The function of the gossip writer", wrote Randolph, "is not among those which commend themselves mostly highly to my generation".

A few years later the young Churchill performed an amusing about turn, becoming editor of Londoner's Diary and one of the best-paid gossip columnists on Fleet Street. In 1938, during the Munich Crisis, he was briefly called up by the Army and asked his father if he would mind filling in for him on the paper. This is how, improbably, the 64-year-old Winston Churchill – just two years before he would assume the role of Britain's wartime Prime Minister – became editor of the Londoner's Diary for a week, filing stories about the political career of Lord Longford and shooting at Balmoral with the King.

=== Post-War ===
In 1946 Beaverbrook handed the Diary to Tudor Jenkins, who did much to shape the column's short, informative style. "No fine writing please", he would instruct his staff at the Standard's "raffish and noisy" offices off Fleet Street. His stance created a section that was "sometimes unreliable, occasionally incomprehensible, but always lively".

After nearly fifteen years on the column he was replaced by the precocious 27-year-old Nicholas Tomalin, who would go on to become a pioneering war journalist. Lauded by Beaverbrook, his "dynamic and energetic" style reflected the excitement of a sixties London that was just starting to swing.

In 1962, Tomalin was succeeded by Donald Edgar, a battle-hardened journalist who had spent most of the war in a prisoner of war camp and returned to work for the Daily Express and then the Standard as a roving reporter, usually in war-torn areas of the globe. He covered the Cyprus troubles and got to know Archbishop Makarios well. Tomalin's elevation to editor of the Diary came as something of a surprise to him, but he soon found that he enjoyed the challenge. He always kept the Chelsea Flower Show as an assignment for himself, and was able to write not only about the people who visited the show, but about the flowers and gardens themselves.

Tomalin had a keen eye for talent, bringing many future Fleet Street stars onto the column, from Mary Kenny and Paul Callan to Magnus Linklater and future Standard editor Max Hastings. The drawling "Old Boy" attitude that Donald Zec had observed thirty years earlier was still very much alive; Kenny recalls that when she arrived "not only was I the only girl on the column, I was [apart from Max Hastings] the only person who hadn't been to Eton."

He was succeeded in 1965 by the debonair Roger Berthoud, who was already known to have a gift for extracting high-class gossip. In the summer of 1963, while reporting for the Standard from Paris, he discovered that General de Gaulle had been avidly following the Profumo affair in the British newspapers, turning to an Elysée aide to remark: "That will teach the English to try and behave like Frenchmen."

=== Recent years ===
Sarah Sands became the Diary's first female editor in the late 1980s. After Sands, Rory Knight Bruce, who had come from The Spectator, edited the Diary in the 1990s, giving a start to many of today's leading journalists and authors, including Peter Bradshaw, Sam Leith, James Hanning, Vincent Graff, Nick Bryant, Philip Kerr, Imogen Lycett Green and Robert Tewdr Moss.

Knight Bruce broke many stories at a time when the Evening Standard was selling almost 700,000 copies a day, often changing the page in its entirety for the noon edition. He taught the team valuable lessons as Sam Leith discovered, when shifting on the column in his gap year. The first was 'the editor is always right'. "As he rewrote one of my stories, I pointed out a grammatical error he had introduced. Pause. 'Look, Leith,' he spat, 'if you want to be an academic, fuck off to Oxford. If you want to be a journalist shut up and do what I say.'"

Knight Bruce was also at this time the joint master of a pack of foxhounds in Shropshire. His eccentric lifestyle was allegedly the inspiration for Martin Amis's character Rory Plantagenet in his novel The Information.

In 1998, Sebastian Shakespeare took over the column, entertaining Londoners for the next fifteen years, through four editors and three prime ministers. After consecutively winning Editorial Intelligence's 'Diary of the Year' award in 2009 and 2010, he remarked:

"Diarists pride themselves on being insiders. They get access to all the best parties while the photographers and news reporters are left on the doorstep. And we also gently nibble the hand that feeds us canapés... Mischief is our mission and mockery is our weapon. In this age of spin, diarists have never been more important."

Shakespeare departed in December 2013, and the column was then edited by Other Club founder Joy Lo Dico. Ayesha Hazarika was appointed the column's editor in July 2019.

== Editors ==
- Robert Bruce Lockhart (1928)
- Harold Nicolson (1930)
- Randolph Churchill (1938)
- Tudor Jenkins (1946)
- Nicholas Tomalin (1960)
- Donald Edgar (1962)
- Roger Berthoud (1965)
- Magnus Linklater (1967)
- Paul Callan (1969)
- Jeremy Deedes (1971)
- Max Hastings (1976)
- Adrian Woodhouse (1978)
- Geoffrey Wheatcroft (1985)
- Richard Addis (1986)
- Sarah Sands (1988)
- Rory Knight Bruce (1990)
- Susannah Herbert (1995)
- Sebastian Shakespeare (1998)
- Joy Lo Dico (2014)
- Charlotte Edwardes (2018)
- Ayesha Hazarika (2019)
- Robbie Smith (2020)
- Robbie Griffiths (2022)
- Ethan Croft (2023)

== Quotes ==
"The Diary and its team of clever young writers were in a way Beaverbrook's spies, sending out signals to the world about the trivial details of great or celebrated people".

– A. N. Wilson, Betjeman (2007)

"The Londoner's Diary should, on the whole, try to avoid treating its readers like ignorant idiots. An innocuous paragraph about Henry Moore is ruined today by the patronising remark: 'Moore is now regarded as probably the greatest sculptor in the West'."

– Charles Wintour, editor of the Evening Standard, letter to the editor of Londoner's Diary (1974)

"The Londoner's Diary was always the central feature of the paper, a touch of class in something of a workaday wilderness ... Its readers have always included both the humble and the mighty, for the Standard circulates widely through the corridors of power."

– Roger Wilkes, Scandal: A Scurrilous History of Gossip (2002)

== See also ==
- Evening Standard
