= The Square and the Tower =

2018 book by Niall Ferguson

The Square and Tower: Networks, Hierarchies and the Struggle for Global Power
- Author: Niall Ferguson
- Language: English
- Publisher: Penguin Books
- Publication date: 7 June 2018
- Publication place: United States
- Media type: Print
- Pages: 608
- ISBN: 9780141984810

The Square and Tower: Networks, Hierarchies and the Struggle for Global Power is a book by Niall Ferguson, published in 2018 by Penguin Books, where he explains how those at the top of the towers of power have been overstated, and the influence of "the social networks down below, in the town squares" has been underestimated. His aim is to highlight and correct this historical oversight. In The Daily Telegraph, historian Peter Frankopan described the book as "provocative". In Prospect, David Goodhart called the book "immensely stimulating, absorbing, illuminating ... sends ideas blazing all over the place".
