= Doom (book) =

2021 book by Niall Ferguson

Doom: The Politics of Catastrophe
- Author: Niall Ferguson
- Language: English
- Subject: Catastrophes
- Publisher: Penguin Press
- Publication date: May 4, 2021
- Pages: 496
- ISBN: 978-0-593-29737-7

Doom: The Politics of Catastrophe is a 2021 book by Niall Ferguson that offers a global history of disaster and examines how leaders respond to catastrophes.

== Reviews ==
Damon Linker of the New York Times argues that the book is "often insightful, productively provocative and downright brilliant" and suggests that Ferguson displays "an impressive command of the latest research in a large number of specialized fields, among them medical history, epidemiology, probability theory, cliodynamics and network theory". However Linker also criticises the book's "perplexing lacunae". In a review for The Times, David Aaronovitch described Ferguson's theory as "nebulous".
