= The Ascent of Money =

2008 book by Niall Ferguson

- Author: Niall Ferguson
- Language: English
- Subjects: History of money, credit, banking
- Publisher: The Penguin Press HC
- Publication date: 13 November 2008
- Publication place: United States
- Media type: Print
- Pages: 432
- ISBN: 978-1-59420-192-9
- OCLC: 191929255
- Dewey Decimal: 332.09 22
- LC Class: HG171 .F47 2008

The Ascent of Money: A Financial History of the World is a 2008 book by then-Harvard professor Niall Ferguson, and an adapted television documentary for Channel 4 (UK) and PBS (US), which in 2009 won an International Emmy Award. It examines the long history of money, credit, and banking.

== Book ==
The book deals with the rise of money as a trade form, and tracks its progression, development, and effects on society into the 21st Century. It also covers the importance of financial systems and the role they have played throughout historical events. In total there are six chapters covering various financial events along with an introduction and an afterword note included at the end. Each chapter covers a different aspect of the financial system.

Chapter one depicts the journey of Francisco Pizarro, a Spanish explorer, as an example of the establishment of gold and silver being used as currency. It also discusses the beginning of lending, or credit, and finally moving on to the foundational pieces of modern banking through the story of the Bank of England in the 19th century.

Chapter two discusses the bond market, focusing primarily on Italy during the Renaissance and their increased usage of the bond market, as well as the development of the Rothschild family's wealth in the 19th century.

Chapter three focuses on the stock market and the occurrence of bubbles. This chapter primarily focuses on the creation of the joint-stock company, the popping of the Mississippi Bubble, the Great Depression, and the Enron Bankruptcy.

Chapter four explores the concept of insurance through various examples such as Hurricane Katrina, describing the life insurance and marine insurance contracts in 14th century Italy, the founding of a fire insurance company by Nicholas Barbon after The Great Fire of London, the marine insurance market that developed around Lloyd's coffee house, the development of mathematical probability and its application by the life insurance fund for the Widows and Children of the Ministers of the Church of Scotland in 1748.

Chapter five discusses housing and the safety behind it being used as a form of investment.

Chapter six, discusses the idea of globalization and its recent implementation around the world, which leads to a discussion of the relationship between the United States and China.

In the afterword, Ferguson compares finance to the idea of evolution and addresses the 2008 financial crisis and the Great Recession.

== Documentary ==
The book was adapted into a six-part television documentary with the new full title Ascent of Money: Boom and Bust for Channel 4 in the United Kingdom. It also aired on TVB Pearl in Hong Kong and ABC1 in Australia. In the United States, an edited two-hour version was aired in January 2009 by PBS.

A newer, reorganized four-hour version with the original full title The Ascent of Money: The Financial History of the World was aired in July 2009 by PBS. Both versions can still be viewed online.

=== Episodes - Original Version ===
==== Ep. 1: Dreams of Avarice ====
From Shylock's pound of flesh to the loan sharks of Glasgow, from the "promises to pay" on Babylonian clay tablets to the Medici banking system. Professor Ferguson explains the origins of credit and debt and why credit networks are indispensable to any civilization.

==== Ep. 2: Human Bondage ====
How did finance become the realm of the masters of the universe? Through the rise of the bond market in Renaissance Italy. With the advent of bonds, war finance was transformed and spread to north-west Europe and across the Atlantic. It was the bond market that made the Rothschilds the richest and most powerful family of the 19th century.

==== Ep. 3: Blowing Bubbles ====
Why do stock markets produce bubbles and busts? Professor Ferguson goes back to the origins of the joint stock company in Amsterdam and Paris. He draws telling parallels between the Great Recession and the 18th century Mississippi Bubble of Scottish financier John Law and the 2001 Enron bankruptcy. He shows why humans have a herd instinct when it comes to investment, and why no one can accurately predict when the bulls might stampede.

==== Ep. 4: Risky Business ====
Life is a risky business – which is why people take out insurance. But faced with an unexpected disaster, the state has to step in. Professor Ferguson travels to post-Katrina New Orleans to ask why the free market can't provide some of the adequate protection against catastrophe. His quest for an answer takes him to the origins of modern insurance in the early 19th century and to the birth of the welfare state in post-war Japan.

==== Ep. 5: Safe As Houses ====
It sounded so simple: give state-owned assets to the people. After all, what better foundation for a property-owning democracy than a campaign of privatisation encompassing housing? An economic theory says that markets can't function without mortgages, because it's only by borrowing against their assets that entrepreneurs can get their businesses off the ground. But what if mortgages are bundled together and sold off to the highest bidder?

==== Ep. 6: Chimerica ====
Niall Ferguson investigates the globalisation of the Western economy and the uncertain balance between the important component countries of China and the US. In examining the last time globalisation took hold – before World War One, he finds a notable reversal, namely that today's money is pouring into the English-speaking economies from the developing world, rather than out.

=== Episodes - Four-Hour Version ===
==== Episode 1: From Bullion to Bubbles ====
Spain mined so much silver from South America (the Incan Empire) that silver started to lose value; “Money isn’t metal — it is trust inscribed.” Fibonacci’s “Liber Abaci” helped pave the way for Europe to convert from Roman numerals to Arabic numerals, especially because of business calculations and bookkeeping. The idea of interest came about in Venice from Jewish bankers. The Medici’s were able to by-pass laws against interest by charging commission on converting different currencies. War bonds became popular in Florence and other Italian cities. Dutch merchants became rich by purchasing spices in the East Indies and trading them in Europe.

==== Episode 2: Bonds of War ====
John Law rose among the ranks of French financiers and ran the biggest Ponzi scheme in France. The shares of the Mississippi Company plummeted after faith was lost in the Louisiana colonies. Financial troubles caused France to struggle for years, and then revolution began in 1789. Nathan Rothschild became successful in the bond market of England. He then was enlisted by the British government to get gold and silver to the Duke of Wellington in preparation for ongoing war. The war eventually ended quickly, and the price of gold fell. American Confederates developed cotton bonds to sell in England to fund their efforts in the Civil War. Once New Orleans fell to the Union, the value of Confederate cotton bonds declined. England stopped investing in the cotton bonds, and the Confederate’s economy became doomed. The British were shipping opium from India to China, which was against Chinese law. When the Chinese confiscated and destroyed the opium, the British Navy was sent to Hong Kong. The Navy crushed Chinese forces and took over Hong Kong, establishing businesses and railroads.

==== Episode 3: Risky Business ====
Hurricane Katrina destroyed New Orleans and exposed problems with home insurance. Two Scottish clergymen invented life insurance for Scottish widows in the 1700s. The world’s first welfare superpower was Japan, primarily to make people more suitable and healthy for being soldiers in war. After Pinochet seized power in Chile in a military coup and became Chile’s leader, Chile reformed their pension program in order to allow workers to invest in private pension funds. Niall Ferguson spoke to Ken Griffin and George Soros about hedge funds and derivatives.

==== Episode 4: Planet Finance ====
Fannie Mae was set up to reform home owner mortgages in the 1930s among other New Deal reforms. Racial segregation in neighbourhoods also meant that people of colour had to pay higher interest rates. Empire Loans and Savings ran a real estate investment scam that eventually got too big and blew up. In 1989, Argentina suffered a financial crisis due to hyperinflation. Microfinance loans proved to be a success among Bolivia’s female population. The relationship between China and America, which Ferguson calls “Chimerica”, was a prosperous relationship where China lent America large sums of money which eventually got out of control. Too many sub-prime loans were made where the borrowers could not pay back the interest.

== Reception ==
Michael Hirsh of The New York Times glowingly mentions that "Ferguson takes us on an often enlightening and enjoyable spelunking tour through the underside of great events, a lesson in how the most successful great powers have always been underpinned by smart money". The Guardian's book review also lavishes praise on Ferguson's efforts by mentioning that he mirrors Jacob Bronowski's The Ascent of Man (1973) by positioning financial markets as 'the mirror of mankind', magnifying back to us our values, weaknesses and psychoses". However, it criticizes Ferguson's lack of "intellectual history of capital": "George Soros gets more attention than Adam Smith and at a time when we are facing what Eric Hobsbawm has called 'the greatest crisis of capitalism since the 1930s', with Das Kapital a bestseller in Germany, is it credible to devote more space to Goldman Sachs's Jim O'Neill than the works of Karl Marx?" The review concludes that "[i]nstead of an inquiring history, what we are left with is a reverential panorama of neoliberal capitalism. Above all, there is little investigation of the losers in the zero-sum game of money's ascent." The Economist considers the book "rushed" and "uneven" but compliments the timing of the book's release at the height of the 2008 financial crisis by saying that "The world needs a book that puts today's crisis into context. It is too late now to warn investors about expensive houses and financiers about cheap credit. But perhaps the past can help make sense of the wreckage of banks, brokers and hedge funds that litters the markets. Looking back may help suggest what to do next. And when the crisis is over and it is time for the great reckoning, the lessons of history should inform the arguments about what must change".

== Reviews ==
- By Robert Skidelsky from The New York Review of Books
- By Tristram Hunt from The Guardian
- By Michael Hirsh from The New York Times
