= Beresford Egan =

British artist (1905–1984)

Beresford Egan (1905–1984) was a satirical draughtsman, painter, novelist, actor, costume designer and playwright. He was born in London but grew up in South Africa following a family move when he was five years old. He returned to London in July 1926 after spending two years as a precocious sports cartoonist on the Rand Daily Mail in Johannesburg.

He quickly established himself in the artistic and literary atmosphere of London. He not only illustrated the works of other writers, but also his own novels. He wrote three plays, composed songs and undertook theatre criticism and caricatures. He acted in British movies, including Latin Quarter, and appeared in the dying days of British music hall as The Great Daleno. His art was highly influenced by Aubrey Beardsley and many of his illustrations were in an erotic vein.

Egan is remembered as one of the few original British exponents of Art Deco. He was one of the most famous people of London's bohemian scene for nearly five decades. He was a prolific writer and book illustrator, beginning with The Sink of Solitude, a satire on the banning of Radclyffe Hall's controversial novel The Well Of Loneliness (1928). That book marked the beginning of a prolific phase of around six years during which Egan created numerous illustrations and book covers for works of Aleister Crowley, Pierre Louÿs and Charles Baudelaire. Egan also wrote a couple of novels, which he embellished with his striking illustrations. He also made illustrations for the monographs produced by his wife Catherine Bower Alcock.

Following military service during the Second World War, he acted occasionally in films, including four for director Vernon Sewell.

He died in London in 1984.

== Bibliography ==
Books/Pamphlets written ( wholly or in part) and illustrated/jacketed by Egan

- The Sink of Solitude. Hermes Press, 1928.
- Policeman of the Lord. Sophistocles Press, 1929.
- Pollen. Denis Archer, 1933. (Re-issued with extra material by Side Real Press, 2013)
- No Sense in Form. Denis Archer, 1933.
- But the Sinners Triumph. Fortune Press, 1934.
- Epitaph. Fortune Press, 1943.
- Epilogue. Fortune Press, 1946.
- Bun-Ho!. Floris Bakeries, 1959.
- Storicards. Barrigan Press, 1960.

Books Illustrated by Beresford Egan - UK Editions

- Fleurs Du Mal by Baudelaire, translated by C. Bower Alcock. Sophistocles Press and T. Werner Laurie, 1929.
- Aphrodite by Pierre Louys. Fortune Press, 1929.
- Cyprian Masques by Pierre Louys. Fortune Press, 1929.
- De Sade by Brian de Shane [ C. Bower Alcock]. Fortune Press, 1929[30].
- The Adventures of King Pausole by Pierre Louys. Fortune Press, 1930.
- Income and Outcome by Nigel Balchin. Hamish Hamilton, 1936.
- Pobottle Stories [ by Nigel Balchin]. High Duty Alloys, 1935–1937.

Books illustrated by Beresford Egan – US editions

- Flowers of Evil. William Godwin, 1933 (pirate of the 1929 Fleurs Du Mal).
- Flowers of Evil. Sylvan Press, 1947 (authorised edition of the 1929 Fleurs Du Mal).
- Aphrodite. William Godwin, 1933 (pirate of the 1929 Fortune Press edition).
- Cyprian Masques. William Godwin, 1933 (pirate of the 1929 Fortune Press edition).
- The Adventures of King Pausole. William Godwin, 1933 (pirate of the 1929 Fortune Press edition).

Dust-jackets designed/decorated by Beresford Egan

- Moonchild by Aleister Crowley. Mandrake Press, 1929.
- ( reissued in paperback with front cover design only, Samuel Weiser, 1992 and 2002).
- A Soviet Marriage by Paul Trent (Edward Platt). T. Werner Laurie, 1930.
- Beast or Man by S.M'guire. Cecil Palmer, c.1930.
- The House of Death by Leon Groc. Dennis Archer, 1931 (?).
- This Modern Stuff by G. Abrahams. Denis Archer, 1933.
- Murder in the Square by J. Smith. Denis Archer, c. 1933.
- The Sultan's Skull by W. Smith. Archer, c1933.

Books/ booklets about Beresford Egan

- Beresford Egan: An Introduction to His Work by Paul Allen. Scorpion Press, 1966.
- Beresford Egan by Adrian Woodhouse. Portsmouth City Museum and Art Gallery, 1979.
- Beresford Egan, by Adrian Woodhouse. Tartarus Press, 2005.

Theatre Reviews and Caricatures by Beresford Egan

- Courier magazine - July 1956 to January 1959
