= India Conquered =

2016 book by Jon E. Wilson

India Conquered: Britain's Raj and the Chaos of Empire
- First edition
- Author: Jon E. Wilson
- Language: English
- Subject: British Raj
- Published: London
- Publisher: Simon & Schuster
- Publication date: 2016
- Publication place: United Kingdom
- Pages: 576
- ISBN: 978-1-4711-0126-7
- Dewey Decimal: 954.03

India Conquered: Britain's Raj and the Chaos of Empire is a 2016 book by British historian Jon E. Wilson, Professor of Modern History at King's College, London.

== Background and synopsis ==
India Conquered is a comprehensive history of British colonial rule in India. The book aims to lay bare that "beneath the veneer of pomp and splendour, British rule in India was anxious, fragile and fostered chaos." It demonstrates that while British colonial rulers projected themselves as heroes and nation-builders, the reality for those under occupation was "a precarious regime that provided Indian society with no leadership, and which oscillated between paranoid paralysis and occasional moments of extreme violence."

India Conquered is critical of the idea that British rule was a coherent and powerful force of control in India, noting the chaotic violence of authorities and the lack of development in India during the Raj.

The British innovations brought to India, civil services, education, and railways had beneficial side effects according to Wilson, but were not designed for development of India, but rather to maintain political power. The book explores infrastructure programmes built by British authorities, such as the railways, and contends they were constructed late by global standards and in the face of "colonial indifference"—with an insistence that construction follow British military priorities rather than local economic priorities.

Literacy rates in India rose from an estimated 3.2% in 1872, to 16.1% in 1941. By the time the 155,000 British citizens living in the Raj left India in 1947, only 12% of the 390 million people living in India was literate.

Wilson challenges the assumption, made by many on the left, that British rule in India was an efficient structure of profit-making, arguing instead that the Raj's power was piecemeal and unsystematic.

== Reception ==
In The Financial Express (India), India Conquered is described as an "extensively researched" work which "proves how the British rule was not beneficial for India and how the British never assimilated themselves with the society, systems and culture of this country," but that the book "lacks proper analysis of the period prior to the British".

India Conquered was praised by the British Financial Times as a "virtuoso takedown of cherished shibboleths of Raj mythology." The reviewer wrote that the book exposed "an arrogant, racist and disdainful attitude towards Indians, and also a belief that British power in India had to be absolute."

In the British Literary Review, David Gilmour notes that "Wilson damages his argument by his insistence on generalisation: the British thought this or felt that...far too many Britons became linguists, historians and other scholars of India to justify the description 'rarely interested'....There is predictably little room in this narrative for the concept of altruism." Gilmour finds that nuance distracts from Wilson's overall thesis that "'They were interested merely in defending themselves and maintaining the trappings of authority.'"
