= The Great Degeneration =

2013 book by Niall Ferguson

The Great Degeneration: How Institutions Decay and Economies Die
- Cover of the first edition
- Author: Niall Ferguson
- Language: English
- Publisher: Allen Lane
- Publication date: 2013
- Publication place: United Kingdom
- Media type: Print (Hardcover and Paperback)
- Pages: 176
- ISBN: 978-1846147432

The Great Degeneration: How Institutions Decay and Economies Die is a 2013 book by the British historian Niall Ferguson, in which the author argues that following the conclusion of World War II, the economic and political supremacy of Western Europe and North America is fading rapidly. He believes that the West is in decline. Ferguson describes an "institutional malaise" that is threatening 500 years of development in the West. Financial Times reviewer Samuel Brittan said the book offers "an informative and enjoyable read."
