= Press Complaints Commission =

Former British voluntary regulatory body, 1991–2014

Logo

The Press Complaints Commission (PCC) was a voluntary regulatory body for British printed newspapers and magazines, consisting of representatives of the major publishers from 1991 until its shutdown in September 2014 following the News International phone hacking scandal in 2011. The scandal resulted in the judicial Leveson Inquiry led by Lord Justice Leveson into the culture, practices and ethics of the British press and led to the formation of the royal Charter on self-regulation of the press to oversee press regulators as they had shown to be ineffective in self-regulating without oversight.

The PCC was funded by the annual levy it charged newspapers and magazines. It had no legal powers – all newspapers and magazines voluntarily contributed to the costs of, and adhered to the rulings of, the commission, making the industry self-regulating. Prior to its closing, Lord Hunt was appointed Chairman of the PCC in October 2011.

Following the News International phone hacking scandal, PCC received heavy criticism from British Members of Parliament (MPs) and then Prime Minister David Cameron, who called for it to be replaced with a new system in July 2011. In December 2011 Lord Hunt announced plans to replace the PCC with a new independent regulator. Hunt also planned to introduce a voluntary, paid-for, 'kitemarking' system for blogs. The kitemark would indicate that the blogger has agreed to strive for accuracy, and to be regulated. Bloggers would lose their kitemark if complaints against them were repeatedly upheld. Hunt's plan was to start the roll-out by targeting bloggers that coverered current affairs at the time.

On the same day as the PCC's closure, 8 September 2014, it was replaced by a newly formed group, the Independent Press Standards Organisation (IPSO), chaired by Sir Alan Moses and previous members of the press of PCC. The new royal charter created the Press Recognition Panel (PRP) in November 2014 to provide oversight on press regulatory bodies under the royal charter. IPSO did not seek approval under the Press Recognition Panel.

== Chairs ==
- Oliver McGregor, Baron McGregor of Durris (1991–1994)
- John Wakeham, Baron Wakeham (1995–2002)
- Professor Robert Pinker (2002)
- Sir Christopher Meyer (2003–2009)
- Peta Buscombe, Baroness Buscombe (2009–2011)
- David Hunt, Baron Hunt of Wirral (2011–2014)

== History ==
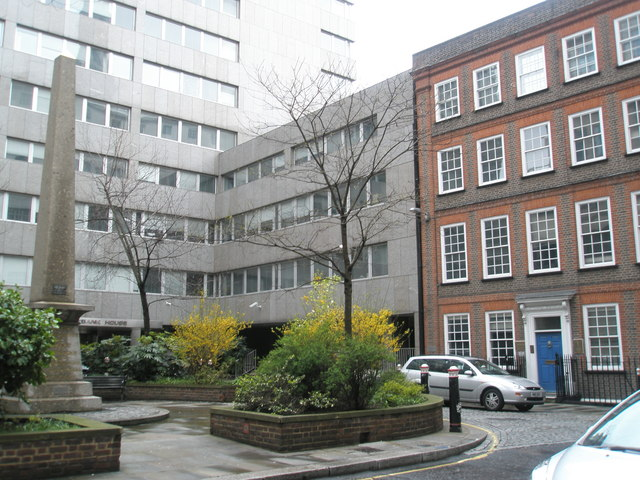
Press Complaints Commission in Salisbury Square

The precursor to the PCC was the Press Council, a voluntary press organisation founded in 1953 with the aim of maintaining high standards of ethics in journalism. However, in the late 1980s, several newspapers breached these standards and others were unsatisfied with the effectiveness of the council. The Home Office thus set up a departmental committee, headed by Sir David Calcutt, to investigate whether a body with formal legal powers should be created to regulate the industry.

The report, published in June 1990, concluded that a voluntary body, with a full, published code of conduct should be given eighteen months to prove its effectiveness. Should it fail, the report continued, a legally empowered body would replace it. Members of the press, keen to avoid external regulation, established the Press Complaints Commission and its Code of Practice.

The first high-profile case handled by the PCC was brought by the Duke of York who claimed that the press were invading the privacy of his small children. The complaint was upheld.

The commission's first chairman was Lord McGregor of Durris. He was succeeded by Lord Wakeham in 1995. He resigned in January 2002 after concerns over a conflict of interest when the Enron Corporation collapsed. He had been a member of the company's audit committee. Sir Christopher Meyer was appointed in 2002 following a brief period of interim chairmanship by Professor Robert Pinker, leaving in 2008.

In 2006, the PCC received 3,325 complaints from members of the public. Around two-thirds of these were related to alleged factual inaccuracies, one in five related to alleged invasions of privacy and the rest included the lack of right to reply, harassment and obtaining information using covert devices. 90% of cases were resolved to the complainants' satisfaction. 31 of the cases were adjudicated by the commission before being resolved as the complainants were initially not satisfied by the action recommended by the commission.

In 2009 the PCC received more than 25,000 complaints, a record number, after an article appeared in the Daily Mail written by Jan Moir about the death of Boyzone singer Stephen Gately. Moir had described events leading up the death as "sleazy" and "less than respectable". On 17 February the PCC confirmed that although it was "uncomfortable with the tenor of the columnist's remarks", it would not uphold the complaints made.

As of 12 January 2011, the Northern and Shell group (often referred to as the Express Group) of publications withdrew its subscription to the PCC. According to the PCC, "a refusal to support the self-regulatory system financially means that a newspaper publisher effectively withdraws from the PCC's formal jurisdiction, which the PCC considers regrettable". Consequently, the Daily & Sunday Express, Scottish Daily & Sunday Express, Daily & Sunday Star, OK!, New magazine and Star magazine are no longer bound by the PCC's code of practice, and the public no longer has recourse to making complaints through the PCC.

The Guardian newspaper reported in May 2011 that social media messages are to be brought under the remit of the PCC after it ruled in February 2011 that information posted on Twitter should be considered public and publishable by newspapers.

Following the News International phone hacking scandal in 2011, which resulted in the judicial Leveson Inquiry on the culture, practices and ethics of the British press. The Inquiry led to the formation of the royal Charter on self-regulation of the press in 2013 to form a regulatory government body that would be overseeing independent press regulators as they had been shown to be ineffective in self-regulating without oversight.

PCC subsequently shut down on 8 September 2014, and on the same day, it was replaced by a newly formed group, the Independent Press Standards Organisation (IPSO), chaired by Sir Alan Moses and previous members of the press of PCC.

The new royal charter created the Press Recognition Panel (PRP) in November 2014 to provider oversight on press regulatory bodies under the royal charter. PCC's successor IPSO did not seek approval under the Press Recognition Panel.

A 2024 review by the Press Recognition Panel, found that the new Independent Press Standards Organisation (IPSO) had not lived up to its promises, and was acting much like its predecessor PCC had. The review raised "serious concerns that IPSO represents only the latest stage in what Lord Leveson defined as a pattern of cosmetic reform by the press." The report found that IPSO had only investigated 3.82% of reports and only upheld 0.56% of complaints it received over a five-year period from 2018 to 2022, despite having received more complaints than PCC had previously. The panel compared the organization with Impress, the only independent regulatory body that has sought, and received approval to regulate media it oversees, which had upheld 21.67% of complaints it received during a six-year period from 2018 to 2023.

== The Code of Practice ==
Any member of the public, whether a relative unknown or a high-profile figure, is able to bring a complaint against a publication that had volunteered to meet the standards of the Code. Members of the Commission adjudicate whether the Code has indeed been broken, and, if so, suggest appropriate measures of correction. These have included the printing of a factual correction, an apology or letters from the original complainant. The Commission does not impose financial penalties on newspapers found to have broken the Code.

Many publishers have added clauses to the contracts of editors of newspapers and magazines giving them the option to dismiss editors who are judged to have breached the PCC Code of Practice. The PCC and its adherents claim that by attaching personal significance to the role of the PCC in the editors' mind, its role has become more effective.

The section titles of the code of practice on which judgements are made are as follows:

1) Accuracy

i) The Press must take care not to publish inaccurate, misleading or distorted information, including pictures.

ii) A significant inaccuracy, misleading statement or distortion once recognised must be corrected, promptly and with due prominence, and – where appropriate – an apology published. In cases involving the Commission, prominence should be agreed with the PCC in advance.

iii) The Press, whilst free to be partisan, must distinguish clearly between comment, conjecture and fact.

iv) A publication must report fairly and accurately the outcome of an action for defamation to which it has been a party, unless an agreed settlement states otherwise, or an agreed statement is published.

2) Opportunity to reply
A fair opportunity for reply to inaccuracies must be given when reasonably called for.

3) Privacy *
i) Everyone is entitled to respect for his or her private and family life, home, health and correspondence, including digital communications.

ii) Editors will be expected to justify intrusions into any individual's private life without consent. Account will be taken of the complainant's own public disclosures of information.

iii) It is unacceptable to photograph individuals in private places without their consent.

Note – Private places are public or private property where there is a reasonable expectation of privacy.

4) Harassment *
i) Journalists must not engage in intimidation, harassment or persistent pursuit.

ii) They must not persist in questioning, telephoning, pursuing or photographing individuals once asked to desist; nor remain on their property when asked to leave and must not follow them. If requested, they must identify themselves and whom they represent.

iii) Editors must ensure these principles are observed by those working for them and take care not to use non-compliant material from other sources.

5) Intrusion into grief or shock
i) In cases involving personal grief or shock, enquiries and approaches must be made with sympathy and discretion and publication handled sensitively. This should not restrict the right to report legal proceedings, such as inquests.

*ii) When reporting suicide, care should be taken to avoid excessive detail about the method used.

6) Children*
i) Young people should be free to complete their time at school without unnecessary intrusion.

ii) A child under 16 must not be interviewed or photographed on issues involving their own or another child's welfare unless a custodial parent or similarly responsible adult consents.

iii) Pupils must not be approached or photographed at school without the permission of the school authorities.

iv) Minors must not be paid for material involving children's welfare, nor parents or guardians for material about their children or wards, unless it is clearly in the child's interest.

v) Editors must not use the fame, notoriety or position of a parent or guardian as sole justification for publishing details of a child's private life.

7) Children in sex cases *
1. The press must not, even if legally free to do so, identify children under 16 who are victims or witnesses in cases involving sex offences.

2. In any press report of a case involving a sexual offence against a child –
i) The child must not be identified.

ii) The adult may be identified.

iii) The word "incest" must not be used where a child victim might be identified.

iv) Care must be taken that nothing in the report implies the relationship between the accused and the child.

8) Hospitals *
i) Journalists must identify themselves and obtain permission from a responsible executive before entering non-public areas of hospitals or similar institutions to pursue enquiries.

ii) The restrictions on intruding into privacy are particularly relevant to enquiries about individuals in hospitals or similar institutions.

9) Reporting of Crime *
(i) Relatives or friends of persons convicted or accused of crime should not generally be identified without their consent, unless they are genuinely relevant to the story. (ii) Particular regard should be paid to the potentially vulnerable position of children who witness, or are victims of, crime. This should not restrict the right to report legal proceedings.

10) Clandestine devices and subterfuge *
i) The press must not seek to obtain or publish material acquired by using hidden cameras or clandestine listening devices; or by intercepting private or mobile telephone calls, messages or emails; or by the unauthorised removal of documents or photographs; or by accessing digitally-held private information without consent.

ii) Engaging in misrepresentation or subterfuge, including by agents or intermediaries, can generally be justified only in the public interest and then only when the material cannot be obtained by other means.

11) Victims of sexual assault
The press must not identify victims of sexual assault or publish material likely to contribute to such identification unless there is adequate justification and they are legally free to do so.

12) Discrimination
i) The press must avoid prejudicial or pejorative reference to an individual's race, colour, religion, gender, sexual orientation or to any physical or mental illness or disability.

ii) Details of an individual's race, colour, religion, sexual orientation, physical or mental illness or disability must be avoided unless genuinely relevant to the story.

13) Financial journalism
i) Even where the law does not prohibit it, journalists must not use for their own profit financial information they receive in advance of its general publication, nor should they pass such information to others.

ii) They must not write about shares or securities in whose performance they know that they or their close families have a significant financial interest without disclosing the interest to the editor or financial editor.

iii) They must not buy or sell, either directly or through nominees or agents, shares or securities about which they have written recently or about which they intend to write in the near future.

14) Confidential sources
Journalists have a moral obligation to protect confidential sources of information.

15) Witness payments in criminal trials
i) No payment or offer of payment to a witness - or any person who may reasonably be expected to be called as a witness – should be made in any case once proceedings are active as defined by the Contempt of Court Act 1981.

This prohibition lasts until the suspect has been freed unconditionally by police without charge or bail or the proceedings are otherwise discontinued; or has entered a guilty plea to the court; or, in the event of a not guilty plea, the court has announced its verdict.

*ii) Where proceedings are not yet active but are likely and foreseeable, editors must not make or offer payment to any person who may reasonably be expected to be called as a witness, unless the information concerned ought demonstrably to be published in the public interest and there is an over-riding need to make or promise payment for this to be done; and all reasonable steps have been taken to ensure no financial dealings influence the evidence those witnesses give. In no circumstances should such payment be conditional on the outcome of a trial.

*iii) Any payment or offer of payment made to a person later cited to give evidence in proceedings must be disclosed to the prosecution and defence. The witness must be advised of this requirement.

16 Payment to criminals *
i) Payment or offers of payment for stories, pictures or information, which seek to exploit a particular crime or to glorify or glamorise crime in general, must not be made directly or via agents to convicted or confessed criminals or to their associates – who may include family, friends and colleagues.

ii) Editors invoking the public interest to justify payment or offers would need to demonstrate that there was good reason to believe the public interest would be served. If, despite payment, no public interest emerged, then the material should not be published.

There may be exceptions to the clauses marked * where they can be demonstrated to be in the public interest.

1. The public interest includes, but is not confined to:
i) Detecting or exposing crime or serious impropriety.
ii) Protecting public health and safety.
iii) Preventing the public from being misled by an action or statement of an individual or organisation.

2. There is a public interest in freedom of expression itself. (Article 10 of the Human Rights Act 1998)

3. Whenever the public interest is invoked, the PCC will require editors to demonstrate fully that they reasonably believed that publication, or journalistic activity undertaken with a view to publication, would be in the public interest and how, and with whom, that was established at the time.

4. The PCC will consider the extent to which material is already in the public domain, or will become so.

5. In cases involving children under 16, editors must demonstrate an exceptional public interest to over-ride the normally paramount interest of the child.

It is worth noting that reporting restrictions imposed by judges take precedence over the PCC's code. For example, under the Sexual Offences Act 1992, victims (even alleged victims) of sexual offences have lifetime anonymity. This means that a newspaper cannot print any particulars leading to the identification of a sexual offence victim.

== Criticism ==
In 2001, Labour MP Clive Soley said that "other regulatory bodies are far stronger, far more pro-active and really do represent the consumer. There are no consumer rights people on the PCC and that is a major failing".

Journalist Nick Davies criticised the PCC for failing to investigate the vast majority of complaints on technical grounds in his book Flat Earth News (2008), an exposé of modern British newspaper journalism.

=== Phone hacking scandal ===
In February 2010 the commission was described as "toothless" by the House of Commons Culture, Media and Sport Select committee investigating the News of the World phone hacking affair.

In a press conference on 8 July 2011, Prime Minister David Cameron described the PCC as 'inadequate' and 'absent' during the phone hacking affair.

=== Self-regulation ===
The 2009 British investigative documentary Starsuckers exposed the request to obtain medical records of celebrities by many of the red-top UK tabloids, and the lack of PCC action against the papers that had broken the PCC charter. The tabloids ran the bogus stories about the likes of Amy Winehouse, Pixie Geldof and Guy Ritchie. Secretly interviewed reporters claimed that "the PCC is run by the newspaper Editors", "Getting a PCC isn't great, but, a lot of papers just brush it aside, all it is, is a little apology somewhere in the paper, you get a slap on the wrist, you get reported by the PCC, but there's no money". The PCC took no action against the papers that ran these stories but did respond with a letter to the Editor of The Belfast Telegraph. The response of Chris Atkins, the documentary's director, was that the PCC had yet still not acted on the issue of several newspapers breaking their Code of conduct 8.2.

The restrictions on intruding into privacy are particularly relevant to enquiries about individuals in hospitals or similar institutions.

=== Funding ===
On 24 August 2011, the New Left Project published an article by Julian Petley, arguing that the PCC is "not, and never has been, a regulator": he presents the case that the PCC is the equivalent of the customer services department of any large corporate organisation, responding to customer complaints for most of the British press. The PCC responded to this article on their own website, stating that the PCC is a regulatory organisation which very regularly intervenes "proactively and pre-publication to prevent tabloid and broadsheet stories appearing". Jonathan Collett said that this method has an "almost 100% success rate". Petley responded to Collett in the New Left Project on 26 August 2011, stating that the PCC "lacks sufficient sanctions to be able to punish effectively those who breach its Code" and that the problem is not the PCC but its funding.

== See also ==
- Advertising Standards Authority (United Kingdom)
- British Board of Film Classification
- National Institute on Media and the Family
- Ofcom – the British telecommunications and broadcasting regulator.
- News International phone hacking scandal
- Phone hacking scandal reference lists
- Council for Mass Media in Finland
