= Oliver McGregor, Baron McGregor of Durris =

British sociologist, social historian and public servant

The Lord McGregor of Durris
- Portrait by Nick Sinclair, 1992

Member of the House of Lords; Lord Temporal
- In office 9 February 1978 – 10 November 1997 Life peerage

Personal details
- Born: Oliver Ross McGregor; 25 August 1921 Durris, Kincardineshire, Scotland
- Died: 10 November 1997 (aged 76) London, England
- Spouse: Nell Weate (m. 1944)
- Children: 3
- Education: London School of Economics
- Occupation: Sociologist; social historian; public servant
- Military career
- Allegiance: United Kingdom
- Branch: British Army
- Conflicts: World War II

Oliver Ross McGregor, Baron McGregor of Durris (25 August 1921 – 10 November 1997) was a British sociologist, social historian and public servant.

== Early life ==
Oliver Ross McGregor was born on 25 August 1921 in Durris, Kincardineshire, the son of a Scottish tenant farmer. At the outbreak of the Second World War, he enlisted as a gunner, before being seconded to the War Office and the Ministry of Agriculture. After demobilisation, he pursued higher education at the London School of Economics (LSE), graduating with first class honours in Economic History.

== Academic career ==
McGregor worked as an assistant lecturer and lecturer in Economic History at Hull University (1945–1947). In 1947, he joined Bedford College, University of London, as a lecturer. He served as reader in Social Institutions (1960–1964) and later as Professor of Social Institutions (1964–1985), retiring shortly after Bedford College merged with Royal Holloway College. From 1964 to 1977, he was Head of the Department of Sociology at Bedford. He also chaired the Board of Studies and the Board of Examiners in Social Policy and Administration.

Beyond London, McGregor held positions including Simon Senior Research Fellow at the University of Manchester (1959–1960), Fellow of Wolfson College, Oxford (1972–1975), and Director of the Centre for Socio-Legal Studies at the University of Oxford, where he led interdisciplinary research projects with institutions like Bristol and London.

== Contributions to social and legal reform ==
McGregor's scholarly work significantly influenced family law and social policy. His first major publication, Divorce in England (1957), critiqued the Morton Commission's findings and proposed radical reforms to divorce laws. His co-authored Separated Spouses (1970), the first national survey of magistrates' courts' jurisdiction over matrimonial disputes and illegitimate children, shaped subsequent legislative reforms. As a member of the Select Committee on One-Parent Families, he co-authored the influential Finer Report (1974) with Morris Finer, including a seminal historical analysis, The History of the Obligation to Maintain, tracing the evolution of poor law and family law concerning illegitimate children in 19th-century England.

Throughout the 1970s and beyond, McGregor contributed to prestigious lecture series—such as the James Seth Memorial, Maccabaean in Jurisprudence, Tom Olsen, and Hamlyn lectures—while serving on committees addressing issues like judgment debt enforcement, statutory maintenance limits and land use. He also presided over the National Council for One-Parent Families and the National Association of Citizens' Advice Bureaux.

== Public life ==
McGregor's commitment to self-regulation in media and advertising defined the later stages of his career. In 1975, following Morris Finer's death, he chaired the Royal Commission on the Press (1975–1977). The Commission's 1977 report outlined institutional prerequisites for press freedom and critiqued the Press Council, influencing its reform. In 1977 he was appointed chairman of the Reuters Founders' Share Company.

McGregor was created a life peer on 9 February 1978, taking the title Baron McGregor of Durris, of Hampstead in Greater London. He became a Labour life peer and an active crossbencher in the House of Lords.

From 1980 to 1990, McGregor chaired the Advertising Standards Authority, revising industry codes in an attempt to safeguard public interest. In 1991, he became the inaugural chairman of the Press Complaints Commission (1991–1994), navigating controversies like the press coverage of the Prince and Princess of Wales and the publication of Andrew Morton's book on Princess Diana.

== Honours ==
McGregor was awarded an Honorary Fellowship at the LSE (1977) and an honorary degree from Bristol University (1986).

== Personal life ==
McGregor married Nell Weate in 1944 and had three sons with her.

He died in London on 10 November 1997.
