= Christopher Meyer =

British diplomat (1944–2022)

Sir Christopher Meyer KCMG
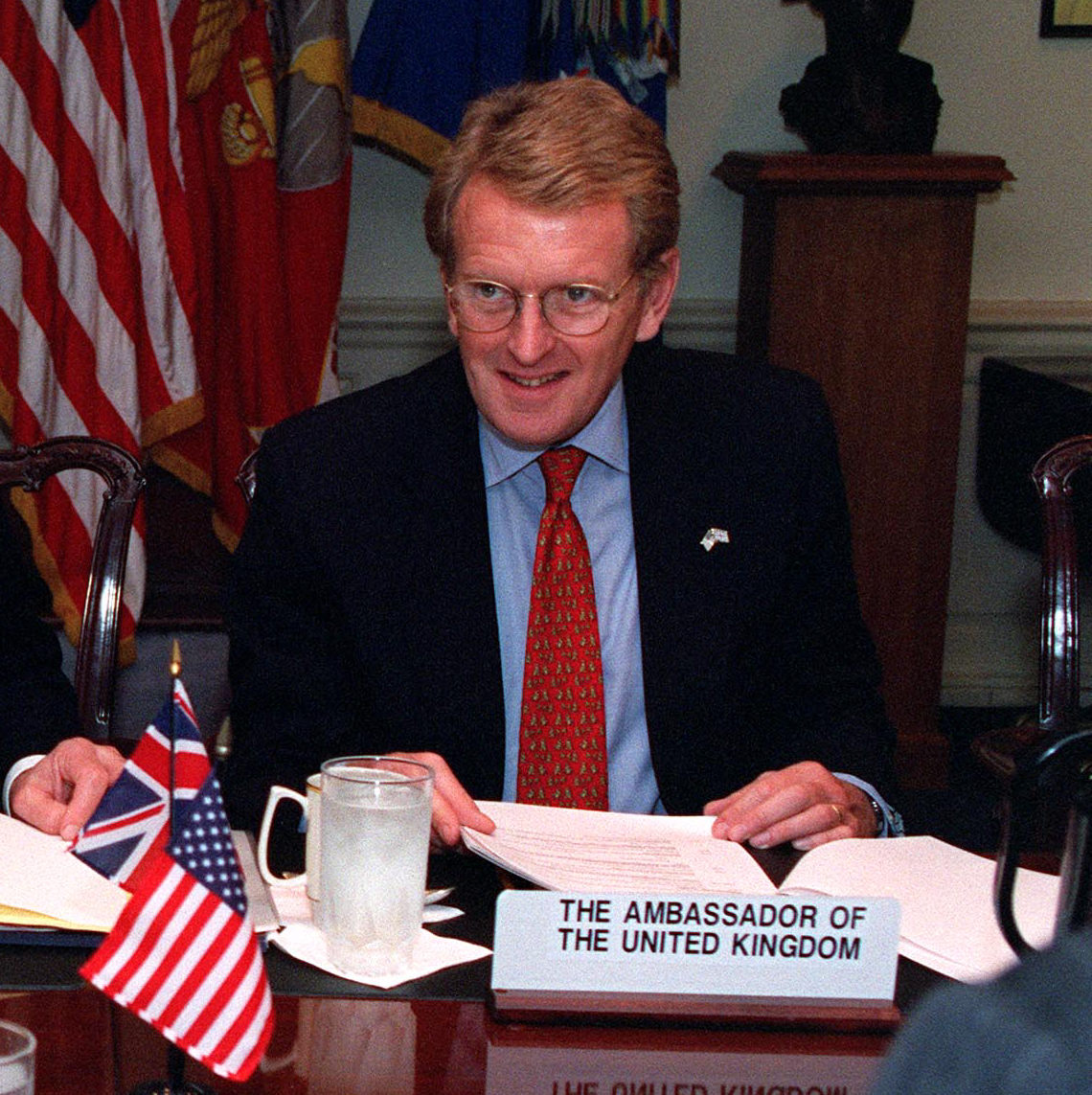
- Meyer at the Pentagon in 2001

British Ambassador to the United States
- In office 1997–2003
- Monarch: Elizabeth II
- President: Bill Clinton; George W. Bush
- Prime Minister: Tony Blair
- Preceded by: Sir John Kerr
- Succeeded by: Sir David Manning

British Ambassador to Germany
- In office 1997
- Monarch: Elizabeth II
- President: Roman Herzog
- Prime Minister: Tony Blair
- Chancellor: Helmut Kohl
- Preceded by: Sir Nigel Broomfield
- Succeeded by: Sir Paul Lever

Downing Street Press Secretary
- In office 1993–1996
- Prime Minister: John Major
- Preceded by: Gus O'Donnell
- Succeeded by: Jonathan Haslam

Personal details
- Born: Christopher John Rome Meyer; 22 February 1944 Beaconsfield, England
- Died: 27 July 2022 (aged 78) Megève, France
- Spouses: Françoise Winskill (m. 1976, divorced); Catherine Laylle Volkman (m. 1997)
- Children: 4
- Education: Lancing College
- Alma mater: Peterhouse, Cambridge

Sir Christopher John Rome Meyer KCMG (22 February 1944 – 27 July 2022) was a British diplomat who served as Ambassador to the United States (1997–2003), Ambassador to Germany (1997), and chairman of the Press Complaints Commission (2003–2009).

Meyer was married to Catherine Laylle, founder of the charity Parents & Abducted Children Together and life peer, and an active board member of the Transatlantic Forum for Education and Diplomacy.

== Early life and education ==
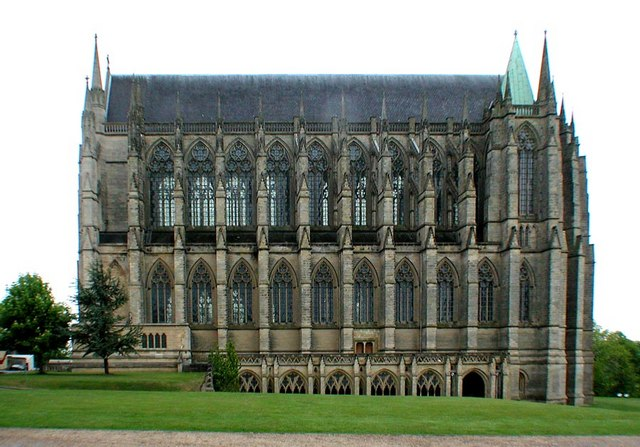
Lancing College

Meyer was born in Beaconsfield, Buckinghamshire, on 22 February 1944, to Reginald Henry Rome Meyer and his wife, Eve. Reginald was a flight lieutenant in Coastal Command of the RAF who was killed in action over the Greek island of Icaria 13 days before his son was born; in 2011, Meyer visited the island and met witnesses of the shooting-down and burial of his father. Meyer published as an Amazon Single Kindle a personal memoir "Only Child" in 2013.

Meyer was educated at Lancing College, a boarding independent school for boys (now co-educational), near the town of Lancing in West Sussex, the Lycée Henri-IV in Paris and Peterhouse at the University of Cambridge, where he graduated in History (he was an honorary fellow of Peterhouse from 2002 on). After graduating, he attended the Johns Hopkins School of Advanced International Studies at Bologna.

== Diplomatic career ==
Meyer began his career in the Foreign and Commonwealth Office in 1966 in the West and Central African Department as desk officer for French-speaking African countries. Following a year's training in the Russian language, his first posting, at the age of 24, was as third secretary to the British embassy in Moscow in 1968, where for his first year he was the ambassador's private secretary. From 1970 to 1973 he was second secretary at the British embassy in Madrid. This was followed by five years in London: firstly, as the head of the Soviet section in the East European and Soviet Department, and, secondly, as speech-writer to Foreign Secretaries James Callaghan, Anthony Crosland and David Owen. Meyer was then sent from 1978 to 1982 to the UK permanent representation to the European Communities in Brussels, followed by two years as political counsellor in the British embassy in Moscow.

He returned to London in 1984 to become press secretary to the Foreign Secretary, Sir Geoffrey Howe, a position which he occupied until 1988, when he went for a year to Harvard University's Centre for International Affairs as a visiting fellow. This was followed by five years at the British embassy in Washington, D.C., as minister-commercial and deputy head of mission. He returned to London in 1994 to become Prime Minister John Major's press secretary and government spokesman. He was posted briefly to Germany as ambassador in 1997, but was transferred in the same year to Washington as Britain's ambassador to the United States.

=== HM Ambassador to the United States ===
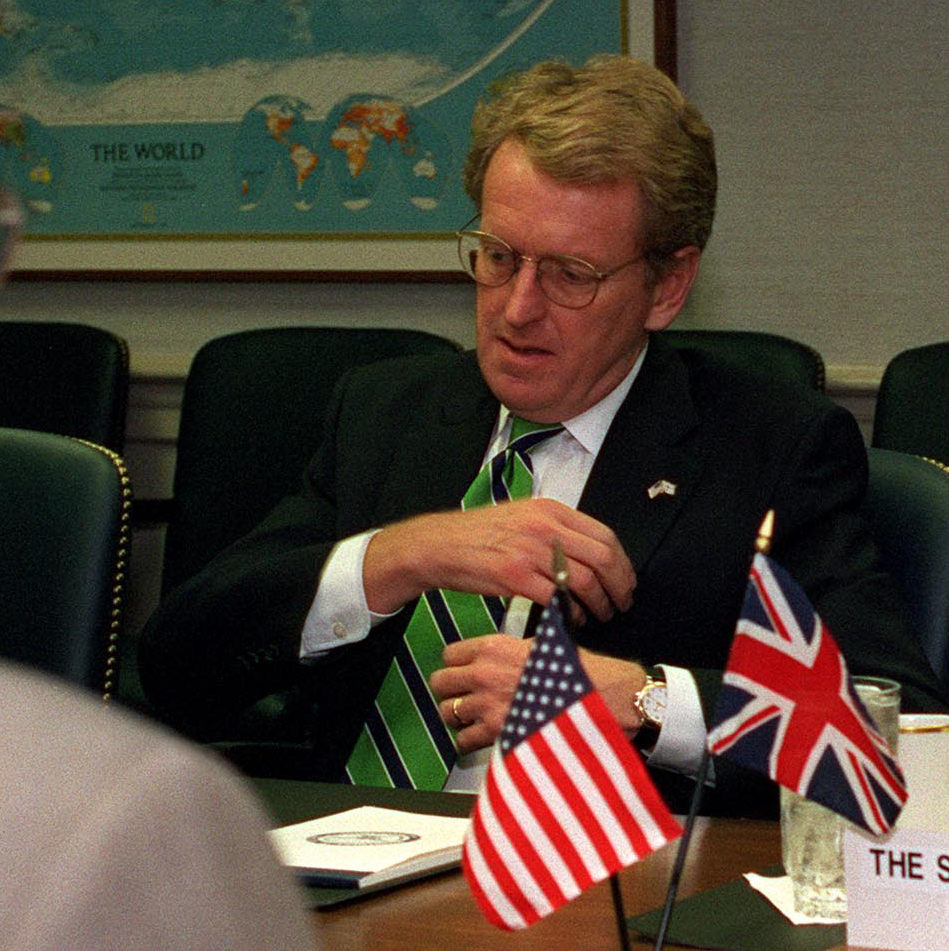
Ambassador Christopher Meyer meeting with Donald H. Rumsfeld on 30 October 2001

His final posting was as British Ambassador to the United States from 1997 until his retirement in 2003. He underwent emergency heart surgery just before the invasion of Iraq in March 2003. Meyer gave evidence about his time in the role to the Iraq Inquiry in November 2009.

== The Press Complaints Commission (PCC) ==
Meyer was appointed chairman of the Press Complaints Commission, the UK press's self-regulating body, in March 2003.

During his tenure from 2003 to 2009, Meyer introduced a number of reforms to enhance the profile, independence and credibility of the Commission. These included increasing the majority of independent Commissioners, introducing independent scrutiny of the PCC's internal processes and decision-making, instituting PCC "away-days" twice a year in the cities and towns of the UK and extending the PCC's remit to online editions of newspapers, including audio-visual material. This led to a significant increase in public use of the PCC, with complaints about the press rising from 2,630 in 2002 to 4,698 by the time Meyer retired as chairman. He was also responsible for developing the PCC's pre-publication activity, including its anti-harassment service, which proved highly effective in protecting people from the unwanted attention of media scrums.

Meyer's tenure coincided with the gaoling in 2007 of the News of the World reporter, Clive Goodman, and the enquiry agent, Glenn Mulcaire, for phone hacking offences under the Regulation of Investigatory Powers Act. This prompted the resignation of Andy Coulson, the editor of the News of the World.

Later, as the phone hacking scandal spread, the PCC, and Meyer himself, were criticised for not having done more to punish those responsible. However, Meyer's powers as chair were relatively limited in this respect; Baron Ivor Judge, the then Lord Chief Justice of England and Wales, said in a 2011 lecture to the Human Rights Law Conference, "To criticise the PCC for failing to exercise powers it does not have is rather like criticising a judge who passes what appears to be a lenient sentence, when his power to pass a longer sentence is curtailed."

Meyer had himself reminded the Leveson Inquiry in his witness statement, submitted on 14 September 2011, and at his appearance before the Inquiry on 31 January 2012 that phone hacking was a crime under the Regulation of Investigatory Powers Act 2000 and that it was not in the remit of the PCC either to apply the criminal law or to carry out investigations that rightfully belonged to the police.

== Writing ==
Meyer published his memoirs, DC Confidential, in November 2005, with extracts serialised in The Guardian and the Daily Mail. The book gave rise to considerable controversy. It was attacked by members of the Labour government (Deputy Prime Minister John Prescott called Meyer a "red-socked fop"), while a group of MPs urged him to "publish and be damned". Meyer gave a detailed rebuttal of his critics in written evidence submitted to the House of Commons Select Committee on Public Administration. In 2005, the memoirs were included in his books of the year by Jim Hoagland, The Washington Post's commentator on foreign affairs, who described them as "thorough" and "credible".

In 2009 he published a second book, Getting Our Way, a 500-year history of British diplomacy that accompanied a BBC 4 television series of the same name. He was again in the news with this book, serialised this time in The Sunday Times and The Daily Telegraph, and again openly critical of the Labour Government under which he served.

In November 2013 Meyer published a third book, the Amazon Kindle single, Only Child, a personal memoir of his childhood interwoven with the story of how his father was shot down and killed in the Second World War. It includes interviews with still surviving witnesses of his father's crash and burial.

Meyer was also a writer and speaker on international affairs.

== Broadcasting ==
Meyer presented several television and radio documentaries on diplomacy for the BBC, including Mortgaged to the Yanks (BBC Two/BBC Four 2006), Corridors of Power, How to Succeed at Summits, and Lying Abroad, all for BBC Radio 4 in 2006 and 2007. These were followed in 2009 by a BBC Radio 4 documentary series on the press called The Watchdog and the Feral Beast. 2009 also saw him present a BBC television series Getting Our Way, which chronicled episodes from British diplomatic history over the last 500 years and was later turned into a book. In 2012 he fronted a six-part international documentary series for Sky Atlantic called "Networks of Power", which examined the power-brokers of Mumbai, Rome, Moscow, New York, Los Angeles and London. The Guardian found the series "immensely watchable" and described Meyer as "Paxmanesque – quizzical, authoritative, faintly mischievous". He frequently appeared on news and current affairs programmes, for example, providing analysis for the BBC's coverage of President Barack Obama's state visit to Britain in May 2011.

Meyer, when asked (in an interview with the BBC) "Which foreign government has the most influence on Washington?", unequivocally responded: "Israel." When he was then asked "And then?", he said, "Well, in the hit parade I think Israel is in a class of its own..."

== Personal life ==
Meyer married Francoise Winskill in 1976; they had two sons and later divorced. In 1997, he married Catherine Laylle. He sat on the board of the charity his wife founded, PACT (Parents and Abducted Children Together).

He was admitted to hospital on the afternoon of 11 July 2018 after an alleged attack by two youths at London Victoria station. He was 74 at the time, and had been doing a significant amount of television work regarding U.S. President Donald Trump's UK visit. A 15-year-old girl and a 16-year-old boy were arrested on suspicion of assault occasioning grievous bodily harm, but were released under investigation while enquiries into the incident continued. The boy pleaded guilty to causing grievous bodily harm without intent to Meyer on 11 July 2018.

Meyer died from a heart attack on 27 July 2022, aged 78, at his holiday home in Megève, in the French Alps. His cause of death was initially wrongly reported as a stroke.

== Honours ==
In 1998, he was appointed Knight Commander of the Order of St Michael and St George (KCMG).

Meyer was a non-executive director of the Arbuthnot Banking Group. He was also chairman of the advisory board of Pagefield and an honorary fellow of Peterhouse, Cambridge University. He was a Liveryman of the Worshipful Company of Stationers and Newspaper Makers and a Freeman of the City of London and, on 3 April 2012, he was appointed Court Assistant honoris causa by the Company. From 2013 Meyer was a Senior Associate Fellow of the Royal United Services Institute. Meyer was named in 2010 the Morehead-Cain Alumni Distinguished Visiting Professor at the University of North Carolina.

== Books ==
- Christopher Meyer (2005). DC Confidential, Weidenfeld & Nicolson. (ISBN 0-297-85114-4)
- Christopher Meyer (2009). Getting Our Way: 500 Years of Adventure and Intrigue: the Inside Story of British Diplomacy, Weidenfeld & Nicolson. (ISBN 0-297-85875-0)
- Christopher Meyer (2013). Only Child. Kindle Single eBook, Amazon.co.uk. ASIN B00GMI3ZN8.
- Christopher Meyer (2023). Survivors, Whitefox Publishing Ltd. (ASIN B0CP8GQX6M).

Government offices
| Preceded by Gus O'Donnell | Downing Street Press Secretary; 1993–1996 | Succeeded by Jonathan Haslam |
Diplomatic posts
| Preceded by Sir Nigel Broomfield | British Ambassador to Germany; 1997 | Succeeded by Sir Paul Lever |
| Preceded by Sir John Kerr | British Ambassador to the United States; 1997–2003 | Succeeded by Sir David Manning |
Media offices
| Preceded by Robert Pinker | Chair of the Press Complaints Commission; 2003–2009 | Succeeded by Peta Buscombe |
