= Mass media regulation =

Laws on mass media

Mass media regulations or simply media regulations are a form of media policy with rules enforced by the jurisdiction of law. Guidelines for mass media use differ across the world. This regulation, via law, rules or procedures, can have various goals, for example intervention to protect a stated "public interest", or encouraging competition and an effective media market, or establishing common technical standards. The principal targets of mass media regulation are the press, radio and television, but may also include film, recorded music, cable, satellite, storage and distribution technology (discs, tapes etc.), the internet, mobile phones etc. It includes the regulation of independent media.

== Content regulation ==
The transmission of content and intellectual property have attracted attention and regulation from authorities worldwide, due to the memetic nature and possible social impact of content sharing. The regulation of content may take the form of selective censorship of works and content most often featuring obscenity, violence, or dissent, with wide variation through time and geographical situation concerning the bounds of legal content transmission. Content regulation also concerns the rules regarding transmission of the content itself. Regulations on content vary, and may come into conflict with each other more often in the context of global information exchange via the Internet.

Restrictions that vary between jurisdictions exist that focus on ceasing the broadcasting of specific forms of content. This may include content that has a specific moral standard or "non-mainstream" viewpoints. About 48 countries have taken legislative or administrative steps to regulate technology companies and the content that goes along with them. The regulations work to temperate the societal issues that occur online, such as harassment and extremism, to protect people from fraudulent activity and exploitative business practices (such as scams) and protect human rights.

A decrease in freedom of expression and anonymity on the Internet has been denounced in recent years, as governments and corporations have expanded efforts to track, monitor, flag, and sell information regarding Internet activity of users through systems such as HTTP cookies and social media analytics. Some of the laws regarding content admissibility are designed to suppress content that is relative to the government and harmful content towards users. The use of artificial intelligence (AI) technology and algorithms is in use to flag and remove inappropriate content, with possible abuses and algorithmic bias. Over the years, content regulation has been put in place to protect and promote human rights and digital rights, such as the European Union's General Data Protection Regulation which sets limits on the information collected by Internet giants and corporations for sale and use in analytics.

== Principal foundations ==
- Balance between positive and negative defined liberties.

The negative defined liberties, legislating the role of media institutions in society and securing their freedom of expression, publication, private ownership, commerce, and enterprise, must be balanced by legislation ensuring the positive freedom of citizens of their access to information.

- Balance between state and market.

Media is at a position between the commerce and democracy.

These require the balance between rights and obligations. To maintain the contractual balance, society expects the media to take their privilege responsibly. Besides, market forces failed to guarantee the wide range of public opinions and free expression. Intend to the expectation and ensurance, regulation over the media formalized.

== Public service ==
Commercial mass media controlled by economic market forces are not always delivering a product that satisfies all needs. Children and minority interests are not always serviced well. Political news are often trivialized and reduced to tabloid journalism, slogans, sound bites, spin, horse race reporting, celebrity scandals, populism, and infotainment.

This is regarded as a problem for the democratic process when the commercial news media fail to provide balanced and thorough coverage of political issues and debates.

Many countries in Europe and Japan have implemented publicly funded media with public service obligations in order to meet the needs that are not satisfied by free commercial media. However, the public service media are under increasing pressure due to competition from commercial media, as well as political pressure.

Other countries, including the US, have weak or non-existing public service media.

== By country ==
=== Egypt ===
Egypt's regulation laws encompass media and journalism publishing. Any form of press release to the public that goes against the Egyptian Constitution can be subject to punishment by these laws. This law was put in place to regulate the circulation of misinformation online. Legal action can be taken on those who share false facts. Egypt's Supreme Council for Media Regulations (SCMR) will be authorised to place people with more than 5,000 followers on social media or with a personal blog or website under supervision. More than 500 websites have already been blocked in Egypt prior to the new law in 2018. Websites must go through Egypt's “Supreme Council for the Administration of the Media” to acquire a license to publish a website.

Media regulation in Egypt has always been limited, but as in recent years, it has become even more limited. In 2018, a law was put in place to prevent the press and any media outlet from putting out content that violates the Egyptian Constitution, and/or contain any “violence, racism, hatred, or extremism.” If any content causes national security concerns or is broadcast as ‘false news’, the Egyptian Government will put a ban on those media outlets that produced that media. The law known as ‘The SCMR Law’, creates a media regulatory restriction plan that allows the government authorities to be able to block the content and those who want to be able to produce content, or be able to publish a website, have to obtain a license. In order to do that, those would need to go to Egypt's “Supreme Council for the Administration of the Media.”

=== China ===
At the early period of the modern history of China, the relationship between government and society was extremely unbalanced. Government held power over the Chinese people and controlled the media, making the media highly political.

The reform and opening up decreased the governing function of media and created a tendency for mass media to stand for the society but not only authority. The previous unbalanced structure between powered government and weak society was loosed by the policy in some level, but not truly changed until the emergence of Internet. At first the regulator did not regard Internet as a category of mass media but a technique of business. Underestimating the power of the internet as a communications tool resulted in a lack of internet regulation. Since then, the internet has changed communication methods, media structure and overthrown the pattern of public voice expression in China.

Regulators have not and would not let the Internet out of control. In recent years, the strategy when approaching the Internet has been to regulate while developing.

Among others, internet regulation in China is generally formed by:

- Legislation

China is the one who owns the greatest amount of legislation in the world. According to statistics, up to October 2008, 14 different departments such as the NPC of China, the Publicity Department of the Chinese Communist Party, and the State Council Information Office, had been published more than 60 laws related to internet regulation.

- Administration

Internet regulation departments in China have respective distribution of work. Ministry of Industry and Information Technology is responsible for the development and regulation of the industry, Ministry of Public Security regulates security and fights crimes, and the Propaganda Department leads the system where departments of culture, broadcasting, journalism, education, etc. regulates the information contents.

=== European Union ===
Most EU member states have replaced media ownership regulations with competition laws. These laws are created by governing bodies to protect consumers from predatory business practices by ensuring that fair competition exists in an open-market economy. However, these laws cannot solve the problem of convergence and concentration of media.

The Digital Services Act (DSA) governs the responsibilities of digital services that act as mediators between customers and goods, services, and content. This comprises, for example, internet marketplaces.

To reduce hate crime and speech, the 2008 Framework Decision deemed that it is illegal to encourage and spread any form of hatred based on a person's race, nationality, ethnicity, and religion. In addition, a Voluntary Code of Conduct was passed in 2016 to counter hate speech online.

European countries could also request a removal of content in other countries so long as they deemed it as a form of "terrorist" content

To control personal data of European citizens, the EU General Data Protection Regulation (GDPR) was passed on May 25, 2018

On April 23, 2022, the European Parliament and Council established a political agreement on the new rules.

=== Norway ===
The media systems in Scandinavian countries are twin-duopolistic with powerful public service broadcasting and periodic strong government intervention. Hallin and Mancini introduced the Norwegian media system as Democratic Corporatist. Newspapers started early and developed very well without state regulation until the 1960s. The rise of the advertising industry helped the most powerful newspapers grow increasingly, while the little publications were struggling at the bottom of the market. Because of the lack of diversity in the newspaper industry, the Norwegian Government took action, affecting the true freedom of speech. In 1969, Norwegian government started to provide press subsidies to small local newspapers. But this method was not able to solve the problem completely. In 1997, compelled by the concern of the media ownership concentration, Norwegian legislators passed the Media Ownership Act entrusting the Norwegian Media Authority the power to interfere the media cases when the press freedom and media plurality was threatened. The Act was amended in 2005 and 2006 and revised in 2013.

The basic foundation of Norwegian regulation of the media sector is to ensure freedom of speech, structural pluralism, national language and culture and the protection of children from harmful media content. Relative regulatory incentives includes the Media Ownership Law, the Broadcasting Act, and the Editorial Independence Act. NOU 1988:36 stated that a fundamental premise of all Norwegian media regulation is that news media serves as an oppositional force to power. The condition for news media to achieve this role is the peaceful environment of diversity of editorial ownership and free speech. White Paper No.57 claimed that real content diversity can only be attained by a pluralistically owned and independent editorial media whose production is founded on the principles of journalistic professionalism. To ensure this diversity, Norwegian government regulates the framework conditions of the media and primarily focuses the regulation on pluralistic ownership.

=== United Kingdom ===
Following the Leveson Inquiry the Press Recognition Panel (PRP) was set up under the Royal Charter on self-regulation of the press to judge whether press regulators meet the criteria recommended by the Leveson Inquiry for recognition under the Charter. By 2016 the UK had two new press regulatory bodies: the Independent Press Standards Organisation (IPSO), which regulates most national newspapers and many other media outlets; and Impress, which regulates a much smaller number of outlets but is the only press regulator recognised by the PRP (since October 2016). Ofcom also oversees the use of social media and devices in the United Kingdom. BBC reports that Ofcom analyzes media use of the youth (ages 3 to 15 years old) to gather information of how the United Kingdom utilizes their media.

Broadcast media (TV, radio, video on demand), telecommunications, and postal services are regulated by Ofcom.

=== United States ===
The First Amendment to the United States Constitution forbids the government from abridging freedom of speech or freedom of the press. However, there are certain exceptions to free speech. For example, there are regulations on public broadcasters: the Federal Communications Commission forbids the broadcast of "indecent" material on the public airwaves. The accidental exposure of Janet Jackson's nipple during the halftime show at Super Bowl XXXVIII led to the passage of the Broadcast Decency Enforcement Act of 2005 which increased the maximum fine that the FCC could level for indecent broadcasts from $32,500 to $325,000—with a maximum liability of $3 million. This is to shield younger individuals from expressions and ideas that are deemed offensive. The Supreme Court of the United States has yet to touch the internet, but that could change if net neutrality comes into play.

Seal of the Federal Communications Commission

In 1934, the Communications Act worked to create the Federal Communications Commission (FCC) in the United States. The FCC is a federal agency that works to regulate interstate and foreign communications. They are given the power to make legal decisions and judgments about regulation content under the Communications Satellite Act of 1962, including the regulation of cable television operation, telegraph, telephone, two-way radio and radio operators, satellite communication and the internet. The FCC helps to maintain many areas regarding regulation which includes fair competition, media responsibility, public safety, and homeland security.

Content on the Internet is also monitored in the United States by federal law enforcement and intelligence agencies such as the CIA using the provisions of the Patriot Act among other acts of legislation, to profile interactions between users and content, and to restrict the production and dissemination of dissenting content such as whistleblowing information.

=== Brazil ===
Brazil’s constitution, written in 1988, guarantees freedom of expression without censorship. It also protects privacy of communications unless by court order. Journalists in Brazil are protected under the constitution and are able to report freely Many media outlets in Brazil are owned or invested in by its politicians that have an influence on their editorial decisions. Much of Brazil’s media regulations change with their change in government, the current government has had very little expansion of laws regarding media regulation past freedom of speech guaranteed in their constitution.

In 2021, President Jair Bolsonaro signed a decree setting out an intention to curb arbitrary removal of social media accounts through new legislation. Judges in Brazil have also ordered blocks on a number of social media and social networking platforms including Telegram, WhatsApp, and Twitter.

=== Fiji ===
In June 2010, the Fijian Government passed the Media Industry Development Decree of 2010 establishing the Media Industry Development Authority of Fiji which enforces media ethics governing all media organizations in Fiji. The Authority has implemented penalties which includes fines and imprisonment in case of any ethical breaches. The aim of the decree is to promote a balance, fair and accurate reporting in Fiji.

=== Indonesia ===
Indonesian Ministerial Regulation #5 (MR5) grants the Ministry of Communication and Information Technology the authority to compel any individual, business entity or community that operates "electronic systems" (ESOs) to restrict or remove any content deemed to be in violation of Indonesia's laws within 24 hours. The breadth and open-ended nature of the regulation, implemented by the ministry in November 2020, can lead to censorship.

=== Myanmar ===
The Myanmar government drafted a law in February 2021 that would empower authorities to "order internet shutdowns, disrupt or block online services, ban service providers, intercept user accounts, access personal data of users and force the removal of any content on demand." The "cybersecurity law" was drafted after a military coup ousted Aung San Suu Kyi.

== Criticism ==
Lowstedt and Al-Wahid suggested that the authority need to issue diverse media laws centering at anti-monopoly and anti-oligopoly with democratic legitimacy since media outlets are important for national security and social stability. The global regulation of new media technologies is to ensure the cultural diversity in media content, and provide a free space of public access and various opinions and ideas without censorship. Also, the regulation protects the independence of media ownership from dominance of powerful financial corporations, and preserves the media from commercial and political hegemony.

In China, the possibility that a film approved by Central Board of Film Censors can be banned due to the disagreement of a specific leading cadre has never been eliminated. The Chinese screenwriter Wang Xingdong stated that regulation over literature and art should be based on laws and not the preference of some individuals. In the field of media, relative legislation must be introduced as soon as possible and applied strictly to avoid the case that some leaders overwhelm the law with their power to control the media content.

== See also ==
- Censorship – Suppression of speech and information
- Communications law – Regulation of electronic communications
- Federal Communications Commission – U.S. government agency
- Freedom of the press – Freedom of communication and expression through various media
- Leveson Inquiry – 2011 judicial public inquiry into the British press
- Media policy – Legislation concerning media
- Media law – Legal services provided to the entertainment industry
- Media manipulation – Techniques in which partisans create an image that favours their interests
- News media – Elements of mass media that focus on delivering news
- Royal Charter on self-regulation of the press (UK)
- Unlicensed broadcasting – Term for type of broadcasting
- Net Neutrality – Principle that Internet service providers should treat all data equally
