= JSN (disambiguation) =

JSN refers to the initials of Jaxon Smith-Njigba (born 2002), an American football player.

JSN may also refer to:

- Jesuit Schools Network
- Council for Mass Media in Finland (Finnish: Julkisen sanan neuvosto)
- National Salvation Junta (Portuguese: Junta de Salvação Nacional)
