= John Offer =

British sociologist (born 1949)

John William Offer FAcSS (born 1949 in Wokingham, Berkshire) is a British sociologist who serves as Professor of Social Theory and Policy at Ulster University. His most recent book is Social Policy and Welfare Pluralism: Selected Writings of Robert Pinker, jointly edited by John Offer and Robert Pinker, published by Policy Press in 2017. Beginning in October, 2021 he will hold a Leverhulme Trust Major Research Fellowship for the project 'Spencer's Sociology: A Study in Retrieval and Revival'.

== Career ==
John Offer was the son of Gilbert and Doris Offer and grew up in the Berkshire village of Finchampstead. He attended the Forest Grammar School near Wokingham. He graduated from Keele University with an undergraduate degree in philosophy and sociology, and then completed his doctorate in sociology (PhD) under the supervision of Professor Ronnie Frankenberg there, which was awarded in 1978 for his thesis entitled "Herbert Spencer's sociology of welfare". He subsequently taught at the University of Ulster, successively as Lecturer, Senior Lecturer, and since 2000 as Professor of Social Theory and Policy. From 2010 to 2014, he was chair of the editorial board of journal Sociology and in 2012 he was elected Fellow of the Academy of Social Sciences (FAcSS). He is Specialty Chief Editor for Sociological Theory for the journal Frontiers in Sociology.

== Research ==
Offer's research has focused on the welfare state and the ideas of Herbert Spencer and Robert Pinker. His published works include:

- "Bringing It Home? Sociological Practice and the Practice of Sociology", Sociology (2016)
- "Christian political economics, Richard Whately and Irish poor law theory", Journal of Social Policy (2015)
- "A new reading of Spencer on 'society', 'organicism' and 'spontaneous order'", Journal of Classical Sociology (2015)
- "From 'natural selection' to 'survival of the fittest': on Spencer's refashioning of Darwin in the 1860s", Journal of Classical Sociology (2013)
- "Robert Pinker, the idea of welfare and the study of social policy: on unitarism and pluralism", Journal of Social Policy (2012)
- "Social change and selectionist thought: on Spencer, Darwin and Runciman", The Sociological Review (2010)
- Herbert Spencer and Social Theory (Palgrave Macmillan, 2010). ISBN 978-0230-20379-2
- An Intellectual History of British Social Policy: Idealism versus Non-idealism (Policy Press, 2006) ISBN 978-1-86134-531-8
- "'Virtue', 'citizen character' and 'social environment': social theory and agency in social policy since 1830", Journal of Social Policy, vol. 35, no. 2 (2006), pp. 282–302.
- "Dead theorists and older people: Spencer, Idealist social thought and divergent prescriptions for care", Sociology, vol. 3, no. 5 (2004). pp. 903–919.
- "Free agent or 'conscious automaton'? Contrasting interpretations of the individual in Spencer's writing on social and moral life", The Sociological Review, vol. 51, no. 1 (2003). pp. 1–19.
- (edited) Herbert Spencer: Critical Assessments, 4 vols (Routledge, 2000). ISBN 0-415-18184-4
- "Idealist thought, social policy and the rediscovery of informal care", British Journal of Sociology, vol. 50, no. 3 (1999), pp. 467–488.
- Social Workers, the Community and Social Interaction: Intervention and the Sociology of Welfare (Jessica Kingsley, 1999) ISBN 978-1-85302-731-4
- (edited) Herbert Spencer: Political Writings (Cambridge University Press, 1994). ISBN 978-0521437400
- "Social administration and its relationship to the sociology of welfare", International Journal of Sociology and Social Policy, vol. 10, no. 1 (1990), pp. 15–26.
- "'Desert', 'need', the social theory of the Poor Law report of 1834, and John Stuart Mill", International Journal of Sociology and Social Policy, vol. 9, no. 1 (1989). pp. 63–75
- (With Rosanne Cecil and Fred St Leger) Informal Welfare: A Sociological Study of Care in Northern Ireland (Gower, 1987) ISBN 0-566-05099-4
- "A Spencer trio recalled: Social Statics, First Principles and The Man Versus the State", Sociology, vol. 19, no. 4, pp. 655–659.
- "Dissonance over harmony: a Spencer oddity", Sociology, vol. 17, no. 2 (1985), pp. 274–277.
- "Spencer's sociology of welfare", Sociological Review, vol. 31, no. 4 (1983), pp. 719–752.
- "Interpreting Spencer", Sociology, vol. 14 (1980), pp. 131–140.
