= Mäenpää =

Mäenpää is a Finnish surname. Notable people with the surname include:

- Jari Mäenpää, Finnish metal musician
- Juha Mäenpää, Finnish politician
- Niilo Mäenpää, Finnish footballer
- Niki Mäenpää, Finnish goalkeeper
- Olavi Mäenpää, Finnish politician
- Outi Mäenpää, Finnish actress
- Olli Mäenpää, Finnish academic
