= Melbourn Aubrey =

The Reverend Melbourn Aubrey CH
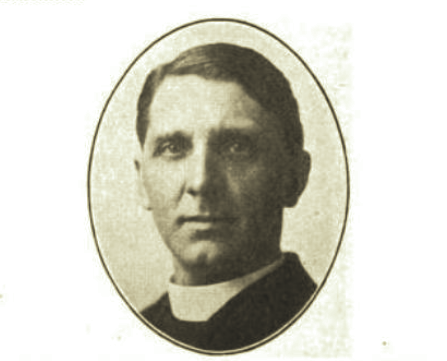

Moderator of the Federal Council of the Evangelical Free Churches of England
- In office 1936–1938

General Secretary of the Baptist Union of Great Britain and Ireland
- In office 1925–1951

Personal details
- Born: Melbourn Evans Aubrey; 21 April 1885
- Died: 18 October 1957 (aged 72)

Melbourn Evans Aubrey (21 April 1885 – 18 October 1957) was a Welsh Baptist minister and ecumenist. He was General Secretary of the Baptist Union of Great Britain and Ireland for 26 years from 1925 until 1950. Between 1936 and 1938 he was Moderator of the Federal Council of Free Churches and presented the Loyal Address on behalf of the Free Churches to H.M. King George VI. He was appointed a Member of the Order of the Companions of Honour in 1937.

== Life ==
Aubrey was the son of Edwin Aubrey, a Baptist minister, in the Rhondda. He was asked by his son to write an account of his life but only three sentences were ever completed: "Your father was born in a public house and I have no need to apologise for it. For one thing it wasn't my fault. For another, it was a very good sin."

Aubrey was educated at Taunton School, followed by Cardiff Baptist College and then as a Scholar at Mansfield College, Oxford. His first ministry was as assistant minister at Victoria Road Baptist Church Leicester prior to St Andrews Street Baptist Church Cambridge where he resided for twelve years.

From Cambridge he was called to the post of General Secretary of the Baptist Union in 1925. Prior to the Second World War he led a campaign to raise £1m for the "Church Extension Scheme." During the war he was also Chairman of the United Navy, Army and Air Force Board of Chaplains, in which capacity he made a long visit to the Mediterranean theatre of war.

After war ended he was a member of the first church delegation to visit Germany in 1946 and became Chairman of the Committee of Churches for Christian Reconstruction of Europe. He was a member of the central committee of the World Council of Churches (1948–54) and Vice-Chairman of the British Council of Churches (1948–50).

In 1947 Aubrey was invited to join the Royal Commission on the Press.
