= Independent Press Standards Organisation =

UK independent regulator

- Abbreviation: IPSO
- Predecessor: Press Complaints Commission
- Formation: 8 September 2014; 11 years ago
- Type: Self-regulatory organisation
- Purpose: Regulation of UK newspaper and magazine industry
- Key people: Charlotte Dewar (chief executive)
- Website: www.ipso.co.uk

The Independent Press Standards Organisation C.I.C. (IPSO) is the largest independent regulator of the newspaper and magazine industry in the UK. It was established on 8 September 2014 after the windup of the Press Complaints Commission (PCC), which had been the main industry regulator of the press in the United Kingdom since 1990.

IPSO exists to promote and uphold the highest professional standards of journalism, and to support members of the public in seeking redress where they believe that the Editors' Code of Practice has been breached. But, its effectiveness is questioned by some critics. IPSO has refused to submit itself for approval from the Press Recognition Panel, created following the Leveson Inquiry.

The Editors' Code deals with issues such as accuracy, invasion of privacy, intrusion into grief or shock and harassment. IPSO considers concerns about editorial content in newspapers and magazines, and about the conduct of journalists. IPSO handles complaints and conducts its own investigations into editorial standards and compliance. It also undertakes monitoring work, including by requiring publications to submit annual compliance reports. IPSO has the power, where necessary, to require the publication of prominent corrections and critical adjudications, and may ultimately fine publications in cases where failings are particularly serious and systemic.

== Report of the Leveson Inquiry ==
The Leveson Inquiry reported in November 2012, recommending the establishment of a new independent body. The PCC had received extensive criticism for its lack of action in the News International phone hacking scandal, including from MPs and Prime Minister David Cameron, who called for it to be replaced with a new system in July 2011. The Leveson Inquiry concluded that a legal framework was necessary to give a new regulatory body powers of enforcement such as exemplary damages and suggested the possibility of a Royal Charter to provide this.

This route was accepted by David Cameron and, following extensive political discussion, a Royal Charter on self-regulation of the press was granted by the Privy Council in October 2013, despite legal challenges by newspaper publishers (Pressbof) to prevent it. The publishers characterised the Charter as "deeply illiberal" and presented their own alternative proposals, which the High Court did not accept as they did not comply with the principles set out in the Leveson report, including independence and access to arbitration.

The industry therefore continued with its own proposals, despite fears that industry representatives would still have powers of veto over the chairman and other board members. The Media Standards Trust also published a critique analysing in detail where the proposals met and fell short of Leveson's recommendations.

One of the government's commitments in implementing the Inquiry's recommendations related to the idea that, while the industry should regulate itself, there should be some independent verification (or "recognition") of the regulatory arrangements the press put in place. The Press Recognition Panel was created on 3 November 2014 as a fully independent body with the purpose of carrying out activities in relation to the recognition of press regulators. IPSO has said that it will not seek approval from the Press Recognition Panel (PRP), which has officially recognised the regulator Impress.

== Membership ==
Several of the broadsheet newspapers, including the Financial Times, The Independent and The Guardian, have declined to take part in IPSO. The Financial Times and The Guardian have established their own independent complaints systems instead.

IPSO regulates more than 1,500 print titles and more than 1,100 online titles, including most of the UK's national newspapers.

The IPSO Board is chaired by Jenny Watson CBE, who also chairs the Complaints Committee.

== Funding ==
IPSO is a self-regulator paid for by its member publishers though the Regulatory Funding Company.

== Criticism ==
The Hacked Off campaign group described IPSO as a "sham" and "the illusion of reform". Hacked Off state that IPSO is "owned and controlled by the very newspapers it is supposed to regulate", and it "does nothing to stop them. Its code says papers must not publish inaccurate material, but it has neither the will nor the power to enforce this and never takes action to deal with repeated and systematic breaches of the code". Hacked Off argue that IPSO should be replaced by a properly independent regulator as called for by the Leveson Report. In 2021, Hacked Off criticised IPSO's handling of complaints against The Jewish Chronicle made over a period of three years, saying IPSO was made aware of the complaints in November 2019 but had not provided a response as of August 2021.

The Transparency Project stated that the remedy IPSO applies when publishers breach regulations is often inadequate, because a correction is "usually hidden away somewhere on an inside page".

The National Union of Journalists said that journalists “still have little or no protection from editors seeking saleable stories regardless of ethical considerations”. In 2016 the NUJ announced that it was backing Impress, as it believed “it represents the best opportunity we have for independent press regulation” and it provided an alternative “to those national newspapers and their publishers who continue to fail to take their responsibilities seriously”.

== See also ==
- Impress (regulator)
- UK Press Regulation
- Press Recognition Panel
