= Royal Commission on the Press =

British commission to regulate & research the print industry

Three Royal Commissions on the Press were held in the United Kingdom during the 20th century. The first (1947–1949) proposed the creation of a General Council of the Press to govern behaviour, promote consumer interests and conduct research into the long-term social and economic impact of the print industry. This led to the setting up of the Press Council in 1953. The second royal commission (1961–62) studied the economic and financial factors affecting the press, whilst the third (1974–1977) proposed the development of a written Code of Practice for newspapers.

== 1947–1949 ==
=== Background ===
The first Royal Commission on the Press was established in 1947 "with the object of furthering the free expression of opinion through the Press and the greatest practicable accuracy in the presentation of news, to inquire into the control, management and ownership of the newspaper and periodical Press and the news agencies, including the financial structure and the monopolistic tendencies in control, and to make recommendations thereon."

The commission was founded amidst public concern that a concentration of ownership was inhibiting free expression, leading to factual inaccuracies and allowing advertisers to influence editorial content. According to the National Union of Journalists (NUJ), such changes had led to 'a progressive decline in the calibre of editors and in the quality of British journalism'. On 29 October 1946 two NUJ representatives proposed to the House of Commons that the setting up of a royal commission would be the most suitable way to investigate.

The decision to launch an enquiry was taken after the House of Commons voted in favour of the NUJ's proposals by 270 votes to 157. The members of the commission were appointed by royal warrant on 14 April 1947, with Sir William David Ross – the pro-vice chancellor of the University of Oxford and fellow of the British Academy – chosen as chairman. The other members were Ernest Darwin, Baron Simon of Wythenshawe; Sir Charles Geoffrey Vickers; Sir George Alexander Waters; George Malcolm Young; Hubert Hull; John Benstead; Eirwen Mary Owen; Melbourn Evans Aubrey; Neil Scobie Beaton; Lady Violet Bonham-Carter; Robert Charles Kirkwood Ensor; John Boynton Priestley; Wright Robinson; Gilbert Granville Sharp; Reginald Holmes Wilson; and Barbara Frances Wootton. The secretary, a civil servant, was chosen as Jean Nunn.

=== Process ===
The royal commission considered the evidence of 182 witnesses and responses to a series of questionnaires. It held 61 meetings and a further 62 were held by various subcommittees. During this process 106 newspaper proprietors gave oral evidence alongside representatives from 432 newspapers, three news agencies, and the Treasury. This evidence was eventually drawn into a 363-page report (HMSO, Cmd. 7700) and much was published in series of verbatim testimonies released as command papers throughout 1949. These are listed in the commission's Index to Minutes of Oral Evidence (Cmd. 7690).

The commission's evidence is now held in the National Archives.

=== Findings ===
The first royal commission focused predominantly on newspapers and allegations of their inaccuracy and political bias. The commission's report agreed that the presentation of news often left much to be desired and that there was an inherent partisanship and political bias within much reporting. It was particularly critical of newspaper owners for offering an overly simplistic account of events rather than trying to educate their readers.

However, the commission did not believe that the United Kingdom's media could be characterized as being a monopoly and dismissed claims that advertisers had undue influence. Most significantly it also rejected the idea that any weaknesses could be resolved solely by greater state intervention.

=== Recommendations ===
The royal commission's main recommendation was for industrial self-regulation through the establishment of a "General Council of the Press" which would act as a watchdog on irresponsible journalism and contribute to the "freedom and prestige of the Press" by speaking with a unified voice on its behalf. It argued that such a framework was necessary, "not to safeguard its own liberty, as many Press Union delegates continued to advocate, but to 'save the press from itself'". The recommendation led to the setting up of the Press Council in 1953.

== 1961–1962 ==
The second Royal Commission on the Press was established "to examine the economic and financial factors affecting the production and sale of newspapers, magazines and other periodicals in the United Kingdom, including (a) manufacturing, printing, distribution and other costs, (b) efficiency of production, and (c) advertising and other revenue, including any revenue derived from interests in television; to consider whether these factors tend to diminish diversity of ownership and control or the number or variety of such publications, having regard to the importance, in the public interest, of the accurate presentation of news and the free expression of opinion." This commission was not concerned with the performance of the press or with general ethical questions.

The members of the commission were appointed by royal warrant on 4 March 1961. Lord Shawcross was appointed chairman, with Sir Graham Cunningham, Robert Browning, William Brian Reddaway, and William James Percival Webber as the other members.

The main archive for the commission is the National Archives. The final report of the commission was presented to Parliament on 5 September 1962 as a command paper (Cmnd 1811), and the minutes of oral and written evidence are published as Command Papers 1812 and 1812-1 to 1812-9.

By the time of this commission, the Press Council had been subject to considerable criticism. The commission's report demanded improvement, particularly the inclusion of lay members.

== 1974–1977 ==
The third Royal Commission on the Press was established "To inquire into the factors affecting the maintenance of the independence, diversity and editorial standards of newspapers and periodicals and the public freedom of choice of newspapers and periodicals, nationally, regionally and locally."

The commission was set up in May 1974. Members of the commission were appointed by royal warrant on 16 July 1974. Sir Morris Finer was appointed chairman; after his death the same year, Professor Oliver McGregor was appointed chairman on 7 March 1975.

The main archive for the commission is the British Library of Political and Economic Science.

The commission chair proposed the development of a written Code of Practice, saying "it is unhappily certain that the Council has so far failed to persuade the knowledgeable public that it deals satisfactorily with complaints against newspapers". The Press Council rejected this proposal. In 1980, the National Union of Journalists withdrew from membership on the grounds that the council was incapable of reform.
