= Press Council (UK) =

British press organisation (1953–1990)

The Press Council was a British voluntary press organisation founded under threat of statutory regulation as the General Council in 1953, with a non-binding regulatory framework. Through most of its history the council was funded by newspaper proprietors, with the stated aim of maintaining high standards of ethics in journalism. The General Council was reformed as the Press Council in 1962, with 20 per cent lay members. In 1980, the National Union of Journalists (NUJ) withdrew from membership. The Press Council was replaced by the Press Complaints Commission in 1991.

== First era: 1947–1962 ==
The first Royal Commission on the Press recommended in 1949 that a General Council of the Press should be formed to govern the behaviour of the print media. In response to a threat of statutory regulation, the General Council of the Press was formed in 1953, membership being restricted to newspaper editors, funded by newspaper proprietors. By the time of the second Royal Commission on the Press in 1962, the General Council had received considerable criticism. The commission's report demanded improvement, particularly the inclusion of members that were not employed by print media.

Chairmen of the General Council of the Press
Name	Dates of Service	Note
Colonel J.J. Astor	1953–1955	Resigned due to ill health
Sir Linton Andrews	1955–1959	Previously served as Vice-chairman
George Murray	1959–1962	Previously served as Vice-chairman

== Second era: 1962–1980 ==
In 1962, following the recommendations of the Second Royal Commission on the Press, the Press Council was formed. There was a requirement for twenty percent of the membership to be lay members, who were not employed by a newspaper.

In the latter half of 1967, the Press Council Headquarters were moved from Ludgate House to Salisbury Square, a location described by the Press Council as the "very centre of London's newspaper land".

During this period the Press Council published a series of guidance booklets.

- Contempt of Court (1967)
- Privacy (1971)
- Defamation (1973)

The Press Council was criticised extensively in the Younger report on Privacy in 1973 and in the report of the Third Royal Commission on the Press in 1977. The third commission urged the development of a written Code of Practice. The Press Council rejected this proposal, and in 1980, the NUJ withdrew from membership on the grounds that the council was incapable of reform.

== Third era: 1980–1991 ==
The Press Council had lost the confidence of many in the media, and the 1980s saw what people labelled as some of the worst excesses of unethical journalism and intrusions into privacy by the tabloid press. In response to two Private Members' Bills promoting privacy laws, the government set up a committee chaired by David Calcutt QC to investigate, in 1989. At the same time, under the chairmanship of Louis Blom-Cooper, the Press Council transferred its funding to the Press Standards Board of Finance and began work on the development of a written Code of Practice.

The 1990 Calcutt report recommended the creation of a new Press Complaints Commission to replace the Press Council. The new Commission would be given 18 months to prove that non-statutory self-regulation could work effectively, and if it failed to do so, then a statutory system would be introduced.

== See also ==
- Council for Mass Media in Finland
