= Catherine Meyer, Baroness Meyer =

British member of the House of Lords

The Right Honourable The Baroness Meyer CBE
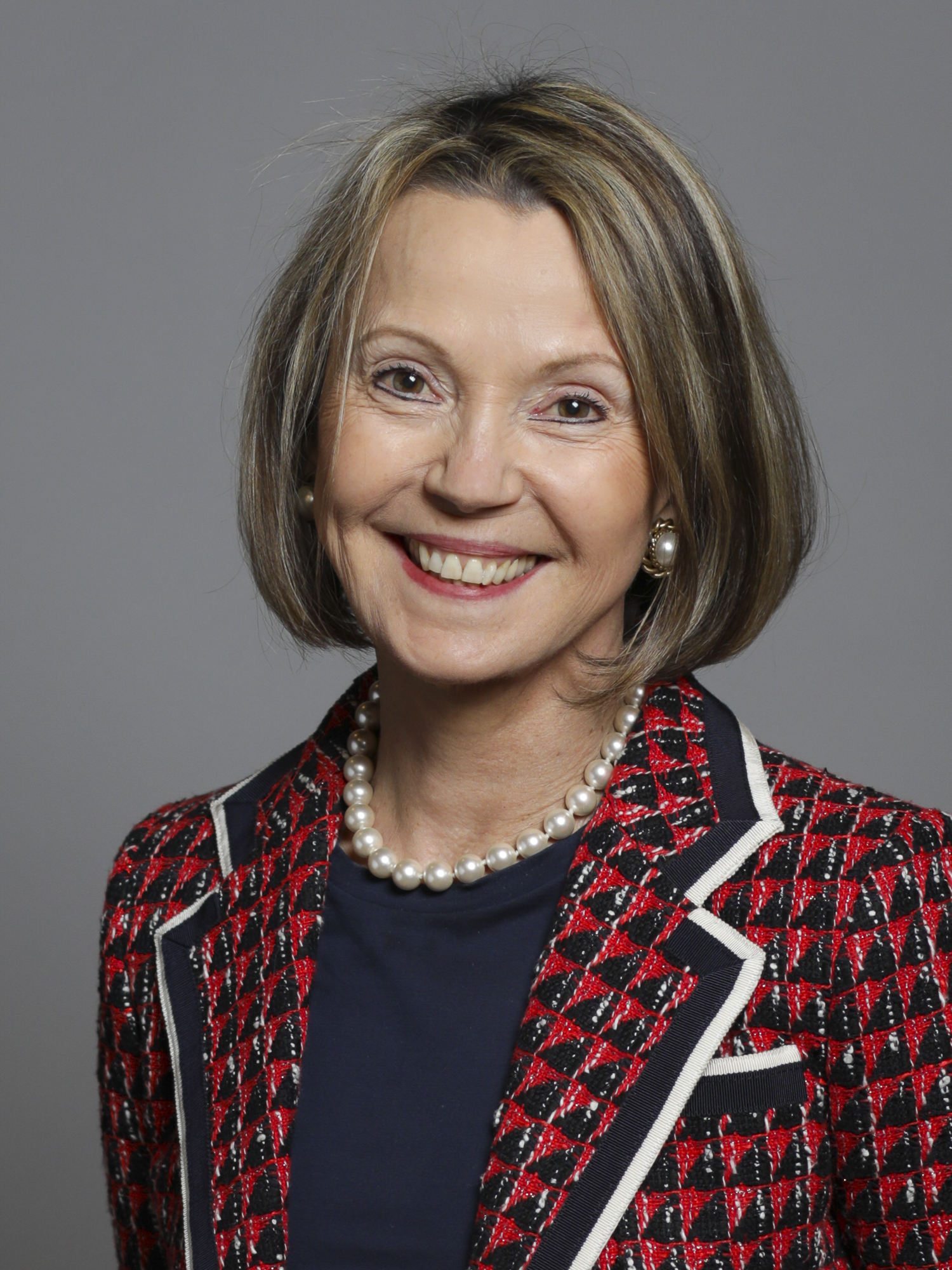
- Meyer in 2020

Member of the House of Lords
- Lord Temporal
- Life peerage 19 June 2018

Personal details
- Born: 26 January 1953 (age 73)
- Party: Conservative
- Spouse: Christopher Meyer
- Children: 2

Catherine Irene Jacqueline Meyer, Baroness Meyer, CBE (née Laylle; born 26 January 1953), is a British politician, businesswoman and Conservative life peer. She is the widow of Sir Christopher Meyer, the former British Ambassador to the United States. In 1999, she founded the charity PACT, now Action Against Abduction. She is the current Chair of the Conservative Foreign and Commonwealth Council

== Background ==
Meyer's father was French. He was a senior executive at Mobil Oil and a former naval officer, Croix de guerre 1930-45, Legion D'honneur, Chevalier du Dragon d'Annan Her mother was Russian, descended from an old aristocratic family in St. Petersburg that fled the city following the Bolshevik Revolution of 1917. Their escape was later the subject of two novels: one written by her late husband, Sir Christopher Meyer, Survivors and another published in France Un long printemps d’exil. Meyer was privately educated at the French Lycée in London, the School of Slavonic and East European Studies and the London School of Economics where she earned a BA (Hons). She began her career in financial services and became a licensed commodity broker in 1979, working for Merrill Lynch, Dean Witter and E.F. Hutton

== Biography and child advocacy ==
Despite her having custody of her children, Alexander and Constantin, her German ex-husband refused to return them to London after a summer holiday visit in 1994. This led to her almost decade-long legal battle in the German and English courts to gain access to her sons. Her account of these events is found in her two books. When Alexander and Constantin reached adulthood, they made contact with Meyer. She commented in interviews that they would have turned out differently if she raised them, but she is extremely proud of them. Both sons still live in Germany.

In October 1997, she married Christopher Meyer on the eve of his departure to Washington to become British Ambassador to the United States. During their five and a half years in America, she campaigned against international parental child abduction alongside a number of American parents in a similar situation with Germany.

In 1998, she co-founded with Ernie Allen the International Centre for Missing & Exploited Children (ICMEC). In 2000, she established her own organisation PACT, renamed Action Against Abduction (AAA) in 2015, affiliated to NCMEC and ICMEC.

During her time in Washington D.C., Meyer co-chaired with Ernie Allen two international conferences on improving the effectiveness of the Hague Convention on the Civil Aspects of International Child Abduction and gave evidence to committees of the United States House of Representatives and the US Senate which led to several concurrent resolutions urging better compliance by certain signatory states, including Germany, with the Hague Convention 1996; and persuaded both Presidents Clinton and Bush to raise with the German Chancellor cases of parental child abduction to Germany, including her own despite not being a United States citizen.

She has also taken her campaign against international parental child abduction to Europe, giving evidence before the Belgian Senate; successfully lobbying the EU to tighten its rules against parental child abduction; and, together with ICMEC, persuading the Permanent Bureau of the Hague Convention to produce a good practice guide to the implementation of the Convention.

In the UK, Meyer instigated adjournment debates in the House of Commons on her case and the issue of parental child abduction in general across frontiers. In 2005, the Parliamentary Ombudsman upheld her complaint of maladministration against the then Lord Chancellor's Department with regard to the handling of her case.

Since 2003 and her return to the UK from America, she has broadened AAA's mission to embrace children who go missing for any reason. This has led to close co-operation with the Home Office, the police, CEOP and other charities. She was a member of the Home Secretary's Strategic Oversight Group on missing people, created in 2006 by the then Home Secretary, The Rt. Hon. David Blunkett. Her campaigns have focussed on the difficulties of measuring exactly how many children go missing every year; the adoption by police forces of the Missingkids Website; and the Child Rescue Alert. On 25 May 2011, International Missing Children's Day, the Home Office announced major changes to child protection services in the UK, in particular the passing of responsibility for missing, abducted and exploited children to the Child Exploitation and Online Protection agency (CEOP). This was the culmination of a ten-year lobbying campaign. Meyer's role was recognised in the Home Office press release.

== Political career ==
In 2003, Meyer was co-chair of Vote 2004, which campaigned for a referendum on the ultimately unratified Treaty establishing a Constitution for Europe.

Prime Minister David Cameron appointed Meyer as a Treasurer of the Conservative Party between 2010 and 2015.

Prime Minister Theresa May appointed Meyer to the House of Lords as a Life Peer on 19 June 2018 taking the title Baroness Meyer, of Nine Elms in the London Borough of Wandsworth. Meyer delivered her maiden speech on 11 September 2018.

Prime Minister Boris Johnson appointed Meyer as the Prime Minister's Trade Envoy to Ukraine in October 2020.

As a Conservative, Meyer advocates freedom of speech and individual choice, free enterprise and limited government intervention. She emphasises individual aspiration, personal and moral responsibility, the national interest and national pride, as well as the protection of vulnerable people, particularly children.

=== Racial harassment ===
On 12 December 2024, the Conduct Committee of the House of Lords recommended suspending Meyer for 3 weeks for harassment "related to race". This followed complaints that Meyer called Lord Dholakia, of Indian origin, "Lord Poppadom" twice during a taxi ride in Rwanda, during a visit as part of the Joint Committee on Human Rights. Meyer admitted she may have said it after drinking up to three glasses of wine at a dinner. There was also a complaint that she had touched the hair of a black MP, Bell Ribeiro-Addy, without asking her permission, which Meyer admitted. She has apologised for both incidents. Dozens of Lords defended her stating that it was against ‘principles of natural justice’ On 8 January 2025, the House of Lords formally approved the Conduct Committee’s recommendation to suspend Baroness Meyer for a period of three weeks. Meyer did not appeal.

== Directorships ==
From 2003 to 2007 she was a non-executive director of LIFFE (London International Financial Futures and Options Exchange). From 2013 to 2014 she was a trustee of the London Institute for Mathematical Sciences. From 28 May 2024 she has been a director of The Museum of Communist Terror.

== Awards ==
In 1999, Meyer received the Adam Walsh Rainbow Award for outstanding contribution to children's causes and was named by British Airways Business Life magazine for her campaigning on behalf of abducted children.

Meyer was appointed Commander of the Order of the British Empire (CBE) in the 2012 Birthday Honours for services to children and families.

== Books ==
- Catherine Laylle (1997), Two Children Behind a Wall, Arrow Books Ltd. (ISBN 0-099-25504-9)
- Catherine Meyer (1999), These are My Children, Too, PublicAffairs, US (ISBN 1-891-62015-0)
