= Media policy =

Legislation concerning media

Media policy or media politics refers to decisions regarding legislation and political actions that organize, support, or regulate the media, particularly mass media and the media industry. These actions are typically driven by pressures from public opinion, non-governmental organizations, or industry interest groups. In some cases, they are influenced by the demands of political leaders.

Historically, distinct policies were applied to print media, radio, television, public broadcasting, and telecommunications. However, these have converged in the digital infrastructure, resulting in markets that are often insufficiently regulated. While regulations exist, technological innovations frequently outpace them, leading to issues such as copyright violations, the spread of misinformation and disinformation, online harassment, and hate speech. Such challenges necessitate legal action to protect intellectual property rights (e.g. the Digital Economy Act 2010), although emerging technologies like artificial intelligence are increasingly undermining these protections. Efforts to address the harmful social effects of digital media are being implemented worldwide.

Media policy operates at local, national, regional, and international levels. These decisions are shaped by political philosophies, governmental structures, industry influence, and the legacy of policies developed for earlier forms of media and related industries.

A media policy typically outlines an organisation's approach to managing media relations. This includes designating spokespersons, handling media inquiries, and ensuring consistent communication. It also covers social media conduct, privacy concerns, and crisis communication strategies, helping organisations comply with legal requirements and uphold their core values. Consistent monitoring and evaluation are essential to maintain the policy's effectiveness.

Media politics is a central subject of media research and cultural studies.

== Literature ==
- Mansell, Robin (2011). The handbook of global media and communication policy. West Sussex, United Kingdom: Wiley-Blackwell. ISBN 978-1-118-79945-1. OCLC 908635289.
- Freedman, Des (2008). The politics of media policy. Cambridge, UK Malden MA: Polity. ISBN 978-0-7456-2842-4. OCLC 236184928.
- Hallin, Daniel C.; Mancini, Paolo (2005). "Comparing Media Systems". In James Curran; Michael Gurevitch (eds.). Mass media and society. London New York: Hodder Arnold Distributed in the U.S.A by Oxford University Press. pp. 215–233. ISBN 978-0-340-88499-7. OCLC 60512689.
- Humphreys, Peter (1996). Mass media and media policy in Western Europe. Manchester England New York New York: Manchester University Press Distributed exclusively in the USA and Canada by St. Martin's Press. ISBN 978-0-7190-3197-7. OCLC 33008396.
- Picard, Robert G. (2020). Media and Communications Policy Making: Processes, Dynamics, and International Variations. London: Palgrave Macmillan. ISBN 978-3030351724.

== See also ==
- Media capture
- Media regulation
- Concentration of media ownership
- Digital rights
- Entertainment law
- Political communication
- Digital democracy
- State media
- Media Legal Defence Initiative
- Institute for Media and Communication Policy
- editorial independence
