= Kari Lehtola =

Finnish accident investigator (1938–2019)

Kari Sulevi Lehtola (18 November 1938 – 1 September 2019) was a Finnish lawyer, who became known as a major accident investigator and head of the Finnish Safety Investigation Authority.

== Career ==
Lehtola was born in Helsinki. At the beginning of his career, he worked for six years as the police chief at Kälviä, from where he was transferred to the Ministry of Justice in 1973. Lehtola was in key position in drafting the Criminal Investigation Act (Act nr. 805/2011) and the Coercive Measures Act (806/2011).

In the mid-1980s, Lehtola was appointed chair of the planning committee of the Ministry for Major Accident Investigation. For the general public, he became known as the head of the Estonian Accident Investigation Board. The Accident Investigation Board was established in 1996 and Lehtola became its first leader. He retired in 2001.

Lehtola served as President of the Council for Mass Media in 1996–1999. His other positions of trust included membership of the City Council of Helsinki. Lehtola started as a city councilor in 2001 and resigned from the council in 2008 after moving to Karjalohja. He was part of the Social Democratic Party's ruling group. Lehtola was also a SDP candidate for parliamentary elections in 1999.
