= Action Against Abduction =

Action Against Abduction, formerly known as Parents and Abducted Children Together (PACT), is an international non-profit organisation which specialises in fighting international child abduction and in helping law enforcement agencies find missing children.

== Establishment and overview ==
Action Against Abduction was established as PACT by Catherine Meyer in 1999.

10 October 2007, PACT and the National Missing Persons Bureau launched Missing Children TV, a TV channel showing photographs and information on some of the 100,000 children that go missing every year. Electronics Health Media (EHM) screened the channel in various hospital waiting rooms around the country.

In 2012, PACT helped produce a website called "Missingkids", allowing law enforcement to disseminate photographs and descriptions of missing children alongside details of the circumstances of their disappearance.

In 2014, PACT produced the British Child Abduction Hub, an information repository allowing for information related to child abduction to be spread publicly via a "Child Rescue Alert", similar in concept to the American Amber alert.

The organization's name was changed to Action Against Abduction in 2015.

== Partnerships ==
Over the years, PACT has partnered with various organizations to raise public awareness of the plight of missing and abducted children. British grocery chain Tesco has partnered with PACT since 2000 by displaying posters of missing children in select stores. In 2006, engineering and management services corporation Emcor partnered with PACT by placing posters of missing children in the rear windows of some of their vehicles. In March 2009, Emcor announced that four children featured on their posters had been found.

== Documentary and research papers ==
PACT has produced a documentary entitled Victims of Another War that examines the damaging impact on three adults of their abduction as children. PACT has also produced a number of reports and research papers dealing with abduction and child protection services:

- Every Five Minutes (2005), which examined available data to try to establish the number of missing children in the UK.
- A Postcode Lottery (2006), which discussed the services rendered by various child protection agencies in the UK.
- Beyond Every Five Minutes (2007).
- Taken (2013), which examined the extent of child abduction in the UK.
- In February 2015, PACT released a report examining the number of child abductions and kidnappings reported to police in England, Wales and Northern Ireland from 2012 to 2014.

== Financial controversy ==
In May 2011, PACT's finances were called into question by the Mandrake gossip column of the Daily Telegraph. PACT replied to these accusations in a letter to the Telegraph.

== See also ==
- International child abduction in the United States
- Hague Abduction Convention
