= Press Recognition Panel =

UK body on the regulation of the press

The Press Recognition Panel (PRP) was created on 3 November 2014 by the Royal Charter on self-regulation of the press.

The PRP was established following the Leveson Inquiry (2011–2012), a judicial public inquiry chaired by Lord Justice Leveson into the culture, practices and ethics of the British press following the News International phone hacking scandal.

The PRP's function is to carry out activities relating to the recognition of press regulators.

The new system of independent press regulation received all-party support when it was devised. The system was designed to protect the public as well as promote the freedom of the press.

In October 2016, Impress became the UK's first recognised press regulator, after its application was approved by the independent PRP Board.

== See also ==
- Independent Press Standards Organisation
- UK Press Regulation
