= Morris Finer =

British lawyer and judge

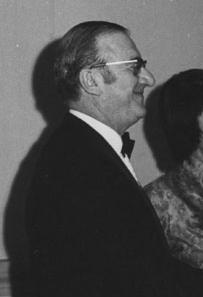
Morris Finer, 1974

Sir Morris Finer (12 December 1917 – 14 December 1974) was a British lawyer and judge.

== Early life ==
Finer was born in Bethnal Green in London, the son of Charles Finer, a master tailor, and his wife Ray (née Topper). He was educated at Kilburn Grammar School and the London School of Economics, where he read law.

He was rejected for military service during the Second World War on account of his poor eyesight, instead serving as an assistant principal in the Ministry of Health. His younger brother was the journalist Leslie Finer.

== Career ==
Finer was called by Gray's Inn to the Bar in 1943, but due to the inadequacy of his earnings he also wrote leaders for the London Evening Standard. He became a Queen's Counsel in 1963 and was elected a Master of the Bench of Gray's Inn in 1971, before being made a judge the following year (1972). He received the customary knighthood on 1 March 1973.

Finer was noted for his involvement in many campaigns for social reform. In 1967, he chaired a committee on behalf of the Society for Labour Lawyers – which included Anthony Lester, Sir Geoffrey Bindman and Michael Zander – that considered improving the accessibility of the justice system by introducing a network of American-style neighborhood law centers, staffed by trained lawyers; the resulting report was published as Justice For All in 1968. Furthermore, under Finer's chairmanship the Finer Report on One Parent Families was published in the early 1970s, and he was subsequently appointed chairman of the Royal Commission on the Press. Before it was completed, Sir Morris died of lung cancer, two days after his 57th birthday.

As a commercial lawyer, Finer was involved in several prominent cases, including acting for three of the Beatles – John Lennon, George Harrison, Ringo Starr – and Apple Corps Ltd over the management of the band in 1971.

== Other activities ==
Finer was chairman of the Cinematograph Films Council and a governor and, later, vice chairman of the board of governors of the London School of Economics. After his death, a Morris Finer Memorial Scholarship was established at the LSE in his honour.

== Miscellaneous ==
Additional information about Finer appears in the Oxford Dictionary of National Biography. A painting of him by his cousin, Stephen Finer, is in the collection of Pallant House Gallery, Chichester, Sussex.

== Publications ==
- Report of the Committee on One-Parent Families: presented to Parliament by the Secretary of State for Social Services by command of Her Majesty July 1974, Volume 2. HMSO. 1974. ISBN 9780101562904.
- Company Law (1948)
- Justice For All (1968) Society of Labour Lawyers
