= Olli Mäenpää =

Finnish academic

Olli Ilmari Mäenpää (born 2 November 1950 in Perniö, Finland) has been Professor of Administrative Law at the University of Helsinki since 1992 and previously held the same position at the University of Turku (1982–1992). He was a judge at the Supreme Administrative Court of Finland in 1994 and 2006 and from 1999 to 2003 was chair of the Council for Mass Media in Finland. He graduated from the University of Helsinki with a Bachelor of Laws in 1974, a Licentiate of Laws in 1976, and a Doctor of Laws in 1979.

== Published works ==
- "Openness and Access to Information in Finland", The World’s First Freedom of Information Act. Editor: Juha Mustonen. Publisher: Anders Chydenius Foundation
- "Local Government in Finland", Local Government in the Member States of the European Union: A Comparative Legal Perspective, Chapter 8. INAP 2012 ISBN 9788473514187
