= Robert Pinker =

British social work scholar (1931–2021)

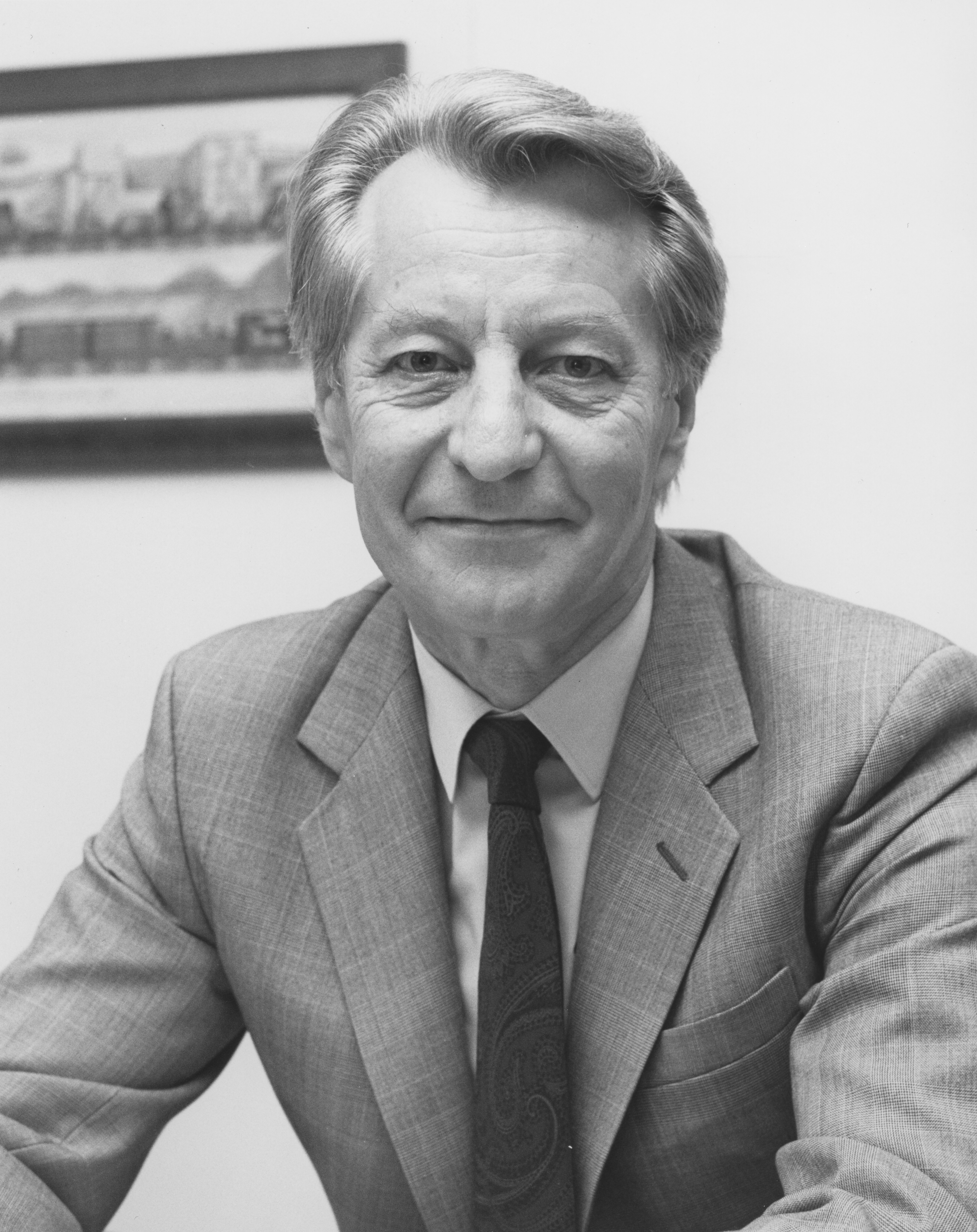
Robert Pinker

Robert Arthur Pinker CBE (27 May 1931 – 2 February 2021) was a British sociologist and press regulator.

== Early life and family ==
Robert Arthur Pinker was born on 27 May 1931, the son of Dora Elizabeth Pinker and Joseph Pinker. In 1955, he married Jennifer Farrington Boulton, who died in 1994; they had two daughters.

== Career ==
=== Academia ===
After attending Holloway County School, Pinker went to the London School of Economics and Political Science (LSE), initially receiving a Certificate in Social Science and Administration in 1959, and then completing a Bachelor of Science degree (BSc) in Sociology in 1962 and a Master of Science degree (MSc) in Economics three years later.

Pinker began his academic career as a research officer at the LSE in 1959; he was then a lecturer at the North-Western Polytechnic, London, from 1962 to 1964, when he was appointed Head of the Sociology Department at Goldsmiths College, University of London. In 1972, he gave up the post and was appointed Lewisham Professor of Social Administration at Goldsmiths. Two years later, he moved to Chelsea College to be Professor of Social Studies and then, from 1978 to 1993, he was Professor of Social Work Studies at the LSE, before finishing his academic career as Professor of Social Administration at the LSE from 1993 to 1996; he was also a Pro-Director at the LSE (1985–88) and the Pro-Vice-Chancellor for Social Sciences at the University of London (1989–90). He was also a Member of Goldsmiths Council from 2001 to 2007, was elected a Fellow of the Society of Editors in 2004 and received an honorary doctor of laws (LLD) degree from the University of Ulster in 2016. In 2015, the Social Policy Society awarded him their Special Recognition Award, recognising him as someone who has made a "consistent, sustained and long standing contribution to the field of social policy, through research, or teaching and learning."

Pinker's published works include English Hospital Statistics 1861–1938 (1964), Social Theory and Social Policy (1971), The Idea of Welfare (1979), Social Work in an Enterprise Society (1990), and, with R. Deacon and N. Lipton, Privacy and Personality Rights (2010). He chaired the editorial board of the Journal of Social Policy from 1981 to 1986.

=== Public service ===
Outside of academia, Pinker sat on the Press Complaints Commission (PCC) from 1991 to 2004 and as a Privacy Commissioner for a decade from 1994; he was acting chair of the PCC for the last year of his tenure. In 2005, he was appointed a Commander of the Order of the British Empire (CBE) in recognition of his public service. He had been elected a Fellow of the Society of Editors the previous year, and in January 2021 was awarded the Astor Award for Press Freedom by the Commonwealth Press Union Media Trust.

== Death ==
Pinker died on 2 February 2021.

== Likenesses ==
- The LSE Library holds two photographic portraits of Pinker (ref. nos. IMAGELIBRARY/1000 and IMAGELIBRARY/1001).
