= Royal Charter on self-regulation of the press =

The Royal Charter on self-regulation of the press is a United Kingdom royal charter approved in 2013. Queen Elizabeth II set her seal on the document at a meeting of the Privy Council after the failure of two High Court actions by the Press Standards Board of Finance to prevent it. The operation of the Charter comes under two acts of Parliament, the Crime and Courts Act 2013 and the Enterprise and Regulatory Reform Act 2013.

The charter creates the Press Recognition Panel (PRP) as a corporation to carry out activities relating to the recognition of press regulators. In a last-minute change the government decided that the system would not come into effect until a year after the PRP was established, taking the process beyond the 2015 general election.

In October 2016 Impress became the UK's first approved press regulator after its application for recognition under the Royal Charter was granted.

== See also ==
- Independent Press Standards Organisation
