= Council for Mass Media in Finland =

Self-regulatory body

The Council for Mass Media in Finland (Finnish: Julkisen sanan neuvosto, abbr. JSN; Swedish: Opinionsnämnden för massmedier) is a self-regulatory organ of the Finnish mass media. It controls journalists related to publishers who have adopted the good journalistic guidelines and makes resolutions on the bases of appeals. It was established in 1968 and one of its goals was to diminish the need for juridical investigations in the courts mainly caused by criticism of the leftist radicals in the late 1960s.

== Chairs ==
Chairmen
1969	Heikki Waris
1970–1971	Veli Merikoski
1971–1972	Kettil Bruun
1972–1975	K. J. Lång
1975–1978	Kai Korte
1978–1990	Henrik Grönqvist
1990–1996	Raimo Pekkanen
1996–1999	Kari Lehtola
1999–2003	Olli Mäenpää
2003–2005	Jacob Söderman
2005–2007	Kalevi Kivistö
2008–2009	Pekka Hyvärinen
2010–2015	Risto Uimonen
2016–2019	Elina Grundström
2020–	Eero Hyvönen

== See also ==
- Press Complaints Commission
